= 2025 Taite Music Prize =

Annual New Zealand annual award ceremony

- Awarded for: The best NZ album released in 2024
- Sponsored by: Recorded Music NZ
- Date: 15 April 2025
- Venue: Q Theatre, Auckland
- Country: New Zealand
- Acts: Vera Ellen; JUJULIPPS
- Reward: $12,500
- Winner: Mokotron

Highlights
- IMNZ Classic Record: Killjoy, by Shihad
- Best Independent Debut: Filter, by Byllie-Jean
- Independent Spirit Award: Rohan Evans, The Wine Cellar
- Outstanding Music Journalism Award: Chris Schulz, Boiler Room
- Website: indies.co.nz

The 16th annual Taite Music Prize, along with four other New Zealand music industry awards, was presented on 15 April 2025 at a ceremony in Auckland, organised by Independent Music New Zealand (IMNZ). The winner of the main award was Mokotron (Tiopira McDowell) for his album WAEREA. The night's other winners were Shihad, Byllie-Jean, Rohan Evans, and Chris Schulz.

== Main award ==
The ceremony and its main award share the "Taite Music Prize" name. Sometimes called the Taite Main, this award recognised New Zealand's best album of 2024. The winner, WAEREA by Mokotron, was selected by a panel of 12 judges who were not publicly named until after their decision was announced.

Criteria for the award include artistic merit, creativity, innovation and excellence. The prize included $12,500 from Recorded Music NZ.

=== Winner ===
The judges described WAEREA as a "bold and uncompromising statement [...that...] not only confronts present-day realities but also expands the horizons of bass music in Aotearoa". It was the first album in te reo Māori to win the Taite Music Prize.

Mokotron, whose real name is Dr. Tiopira McDowell (Ngāti Hine), wrote and composed WAEREA alone. On the night of his win he reflected on how, being in his 40s, his life was half over and there had once been a time when he'd believed he lacked musical talent and had given up on making it. The day after his win he credited his music's originality to his tendency to not engage much with other popular music like L.A.B. or Katchafire. The Taite win surprised him, and he was considering spending the prize money to upgrade his studio space in his west Auckland garage.

He also believed that WAEREA's positive reception had an element of luck to it, with the political climate around the Principles of the Treaty of Waitangi Bill making it a good time for music like his:

Shoutout David Seymour, so much. I've been an angry Māori for the last 25 years, but it's perfect timing. I do think that a lot of support [for WAEREA] has come through because the politics of the hour require an artistic pushback. I was lucky to be that one who, for some fluke of a reason, was making really dark really honest, really political music. [...] I was lucky that I timed it right. They say it takes 15 years to blow up overnight. You just need to be the Hone on the spot for long enough that the spotlight comes on you. I fluked it - it's just bullshit, eh? I just got lucky. If it came out in 2017 there would have been no audience for it but it came right in the middle of that white power firestorm. — Mokotron

=== Nominations and finalists ===
An open call for nominations ran from December 2024 to January 2025, and a total of 81 albums were entered. This list went to a vote of all IMNZ members, 584 of whom voted. Ten finalists were announced on March 3.

Troy Kingi, winner of the 2020 Taite Music Prize, was shortlisted for a fourth time. Gussie Larkin of Earth Tongue also made her fourth final, after three with Mermaidens. Fazerdaze became a three-time finalist and Anna Coddington, Mel Parsons and Delaney Davidson all added to one earlier appearance.

Artist	Album	Label	Result
Holly Arrowsmith	Blue Dreams	Leather Jacket Recordings	Nominated
Anna Coddington	Te Whakamiha	Loop Recordings Aot(ear)oa	Nominated
DARTZ	Dangerous Day to be a Cold One	Flying Nun	Nominated
Delaney Davidson	Out of My Head	Rough Diamond	Nominated
Earth Tongue	Great Haunting	In The Red	Nominated
Fazerdaze	Soft Power	Buttrfly Records	Nominated
Georgia Lines	The Rose of Jericho	(Independent)	Nominated
MOKOTRON	WAEREA	Sunreturn	Won
Mel Parsons	Sabotage	Cape Road Recordings	Nominated
Troy Kingi	Leatherman & the Mojave Green	AllGood Absolute Alternative Records	Nominated

=== Judging panel ===
Taite Music Prize judging panels are kept anonymous before the award is announced. In alphabetical order, the 2025 judges were:

- Chris Cudby of Under The Radar, two-time nominee for the Outstanding Music Journalism Award.
- Hariet Ellis, IMNZ board member, label manager at Flying Nun Records, and member of 2024 finalists Dick Move.
- Paddy Hill of Roundhead Studios.
- Jazmine Mary, IMNZ board member, winner of the 2022 Best Independent Debut Award, and member of Pony Baby (nominated for the same prize in 2025).
- Annabel Kean, filmmaker with Sports Team LTD and 2022 nominee for the Outstanding Music Journalism Award.
- Stormie Kereopa-Lloyd of APRA, also an artist manager.
- Damon Newton from Auckland Live.
- Karl Puschmann, freelance journalist and nominee for the Outstanding Music Journalism Award.
- Tony Stamp of RNZ, winner of the inaugural Outstanding Music Journalism Award in 2022.
- Sarah Thomson from New Zealand On Air.
- Tom Tremewan of 95bFM.
- Lyric Waiwiri-Smith of The Spinoff.

== IMNZ Classic Record award ==
Killjoy by Shihad, first released in 1995, was the IMNZ Classic Record for 2025. This was announced on 27 March, ahead of the award presentation. There was no public nomination process or vote. Shihad's final ever tour, Loud Forever, had concluded only weeks earlier. The award was presented by Murray Cammick (winner of the Independent Spirit Award at the 2020 Taite Music Prize).

== Auckland Live Best Independent Debut award ==
The Best Independent Debut Award, sponsored by Auckland Live, went to Byllie-jean (Ngāti Kahungunu ki Heretaunga, Ngāti Pahauwera) for her EP Filter. In her acceptance speech, Byllie-jean described it as a "win for all wāhine Māori". The award included $2,000 cash and studio recording time with Parachute Studios.

=== Nominations and finalists ===
Like the Taite Main, an open nomination round for the Best Independent Debut Award was held in early 2025. A shortlist of four finalists was announced before the award ceremony. Pony Baby's Jazmine Mary, who won the Best Debut Award of 2022 for her solo album The Licking of a Tangerine, became a two-time finalist.

Artist	Album	Label	Result
Byllie-jean	Filter	Wā-noir Records	Won
Pony Baby	Pony Baby	(independent)	Nominated
VIDA	Aquatopialien	(independent)	Nominated
花溪 Flowerstream	Flowers Dream	Hokima Dihar Records	Nominated

== NZ On Air Outstanding Music Journalism award ==
In its fourth year, The Outstanding Music Journalism Award went to Chris Schulz, author of the Substack newsletter, Boiler Room. He was one of three finalists announced ahead of the award ceremony. Schulz was late to the ceremony, so the award was accepted on his behalf by fellow nominee Karl Puschmann. It was presented by Suzanne De Spong of New Zealand On Air. The next day Schulz wrote, "it feels pretty good to win an award!". He described Boiler Room as "my super personal lil’ newsletter, where I try to unpack the best and worst of this wayward, wonky, wonderful music industry of ours, with my name at the top of every single edition."

Nominee(s)	Publication	Result
Rosa Nevison, Sam Elliott, Flynn Robson	Newzician Magazine	Nominated
Karl Puschmann	Antenna Media	Nominated
Chris Schulz	Boiler Room	Won

== Independent Spirit award ==
The winner of the Independent Spirit award for 2025 was Rohan Evans, founder The Wine Cellar. For 20 years his music venue in Auckland's St Kevin's Arcade had championed local artists, emerging talent, and independent music. Evans ran The Wine Cellar from 2004 until mid-2024, when it was physically merged with the neighbouring Whammy Bar to form Double Whammy.

== Award ceremony ==
The 2025 Taite Music Prize ceremony, on 15 April, was the seventh to be held at Auckland's Q Theatre. Performers on the night included two previous winners of the Best Debit Album award, Jazmine Mary and JUJULIPPS. Attendees included Government minister Chris Bishop and Green Party co-leader Chlöe Swarbrick.
