= 2026 Taite Music Prize =

Music award ceremony

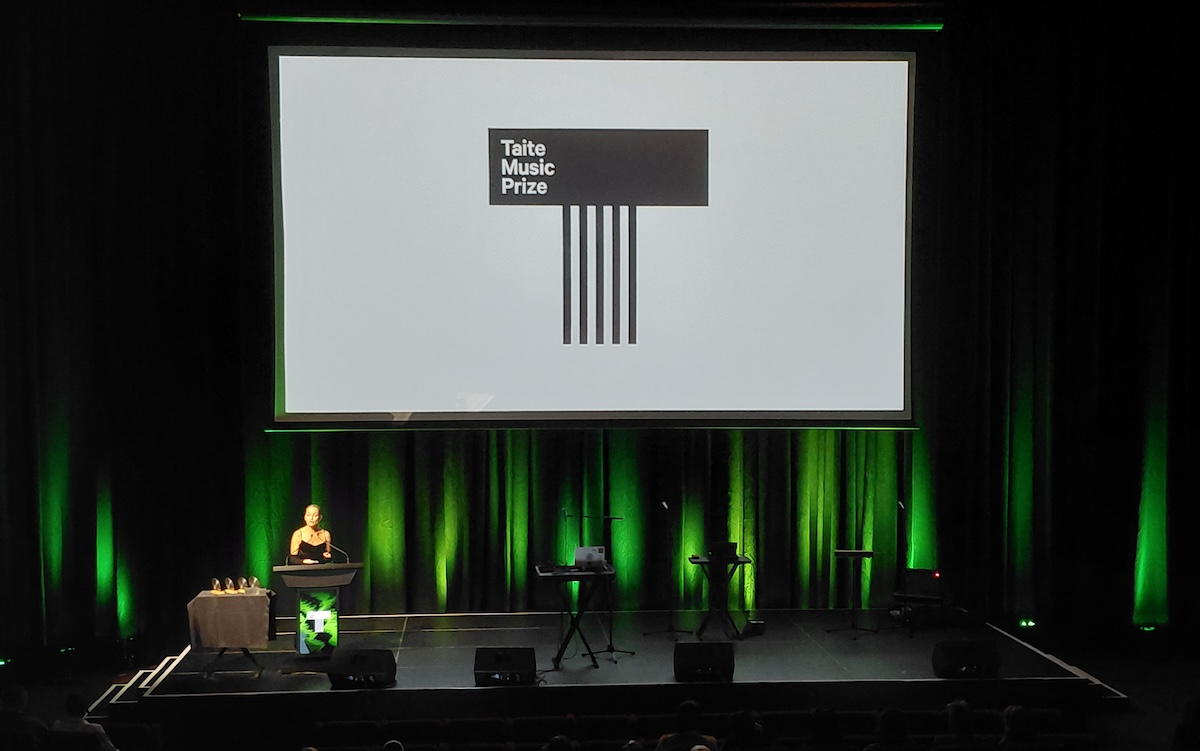
- Awarded for: The best NZ album released in 2025
- Sponsored by: Recorded Music NZ
- Date: 29 April 2026
- Venue: New Zealand International Convention Centre
- Country: New Zealand
- Hosted by: Sarah Thomson, NZ On Air
- Acts: Mokotron; Byllie-Jean
- Reward: $12,500

Highlights
- Taite Music Prize: Te Whare Tīwekaweka, by Marlon Williams
- IMNZ Classic Record: Crazy? Yes! Dumb? No!, by The Mint Chicks
- Best Independent Debut Award: Pikipiki by Geneva AM
- Independent Spirit Award: Carmel Bennett
- Outstanding Music Journalism Award: Rosa Nevison, Flynn Robson, and Sam Elliott (Newsician)
- Website: indies.co.nz

The 17th annual Taite Music Prize, along with four other New Zealand music industry awards, was presented on 29 April 2026 at a public ceremony in Auckland, organised by Independent Music New Zealand (IMNZ). The winner of the main award was Marlon Williams for his album Te Whare Tīwekaweka.

The night's other winners were The Mint Chicks, Geneva AM, the founders of Newsician magazine, and Carmel Bennett.

== Main award ==
The ceremony and its main award share the "Taite Music Prize" name. Sometimes called the Taite Main, this award recognises New Zealand's best album of the previous year (2025). The winner was selected by a panel of judges who were not publicly named until after their decision was announced. Criteria for the award include artistic merit, creativity, innovation and excellence. The winner received $12,500 from Recorded Music NZ.

=== Winner ===
Marlon Williams accepted the award via video from Norway, and collaborator Kommi Tamati-Elliffe represented him in person. Williams said, "the Taite Prize is a very illustrious and prestigious thing. E mihi ana ki a koe mō māhāra [thank you for your memory], Dylan Taite, and to the Taite family for your legacy – not only with this award, but for the incredible standard you brought to journalism in New Zealand."

The Taite Music Prize completed Williams' "STAG" - a multi-faceted achievement (similar to the EGOT) that also includes the Silver Scroll, Aotearoa Music Awards, and a gold record.

The award was presented by 2025 Taite Music Prize winner Mokotron, whose WAEREA was the first te reo Māori album to have won. Te Whare Tīwekaweka made it two in a row. The judging panel had held three round table discussions before deciding on Te Whare Tīwekaweka.

=== Nominations and finalists ===
An open call for nominations closed on 30 January. A total of 83 albums were entered, with all IMNZ members eligible to cast up to ten votes for their preferred finalists.

The ten finalists, four of which were released by Flying Nun Records, were announced on 2 March. They included two previous winners, Reb Fountain (2021) and Tom Scott (2019), and 2022's Best Independent Debut winner, Jazmine Mary. Scott (Home Brew, @Peace, Avantdale Bowling Club) made a record eighth final. As well as being shortlisted for the main Taite Prize, Pikipiki by Geneva AM won the Best Independent Debut award.

2026 Taite Music Prize finalists
Artist	Album	Label	Result
Dick Move	Dream, Believe, Achieve	1:12 Records & Flying Nun	Nominated
Geneva AM	Pikipiki	(Independent)	Nominated
Reb Fountain	How Love Bends	Fountain Records	Nominated
MĀ	Blame It On The Weather	(Independent)	Nominated
Jazmine Mary	I Want to Rock and Roll	Flying Nun	Nominated
Phoebe Rings	Aseurai	Carpark Records	Nominated
Ringlets	The Lord Is My German Shepherd (Time for Walkies)	Flying Nun	Nominated
Tom Scott	ANITYA	Years Gone By	Nominated
Marlon Williams	Te Whare Tīwekaweka	Marlon Williams Music	Won
Womb	One Is Always Heading Somewhere	Flying Nun	Nominated

=== Judging panel ===
The judges of the 2026 Taite Music Prize and the Best Independent Debut award were:

- Damon Newton (Auckland Live)
- Pennie Black (Concord Publishing, IMNZ Board Member)
- Dianne Swann (musician, IMNZ Board Member)
- Tom Tremewan (95bFM)
- Chris Schulz (Boiler Room, winner of the 2025 Outstanding Music Journalism award)
- Lydia Jenkin (APRA)
- Hunter Keane (Flying Out)
- Rachel Ashby (NZ Music Commission)
- Casey Yeoh (NZ on Air)
- Chris Cudby (Under The Radar, finalist for Outstanding Music Journalism Award)
- Effie Jaxx (Radio One)

== IMNZ Classic Record award ==
Crazy? Yes! Dumb? No! by The Mint Chicks, first released in 2006 on Flying Nun Records, was announced as 2026's winner of the IMNZ Classic Album award on 24 March. Being 20 years old, it was the first year that the album was eligible. The winner was selected by "a panel of music journalists, radio staff, and industry experts" with no public nomination process or vote. The Mint Chicks' two leading members, brothers Ruban and Kody Nielson, had both already won main Taite Music Prizes, in 2012 and 2016 respectively.

Three of the four band members accepted the award, with Ruban Neilson being overseas. Their former manager John Baker gave a speech that included stories of the band taking a chainsaw onstage at the Big Day Out and playing so loudly at Auckland's St. James Theatre that pieces of ceiling fell on the crowd.

== Auckland Live Best Independent Debut award ==
The award for the best debut album of 2025 went to Geneva AM, for Pikipiki. Accepting the award, she said, "We need to stay united, keep creating, and continue enjoying the art of tinkering."

Like the Taite Main, an open nomination round for the Best Independent Debut Award was held in early 2026. A total of 19 records were submitted to a vote of IMNZ's membership. Three finalists were announced on 24 March. Pikipiki was a double finalist, also being shortlisted for the Taite Main.

2026 Best Independent Debut finalists
Artist	Album	Label	Result
Bub	Can’t Even	(Independent)	Nominated
Geneva AM	Pikipiki	(Independent)	Won
Babe Martin	Not A Bee, But A Wasp	Sunreturn	Nominated

== NZ On Air Outstanding Music Journalism award ==
Rosa Nevison, Flynn Robson and Sam Elliott, creators of Newsician Magazine, won the Outstanding Music Journalism award

Three finalists for this award, which recognises excellence in music storytelling, were announced ahead of the award ceremony on 24 March. Newzician Magazine was also a finalist in 2025, and Chris Cudby became a three-time finalist after 2022 and 2023.

Nominee	Publication	Result
Chris Cudby	Under the Radar	Nominated
Flynn Robson, Rosa Nevison & Sam Elliott	Newzician Magazine	Won
Hunter Keane	Long Player, 95bFM	Nominated

=== Judges ===
Panellists who decided the winner of the Outstanding Music Journalism award were:

- Taylor MacGregor (95bFM, Independent Music Venues Aotearoa, IMNZ board member)
- Pippa Ryan-Kidd (IMNZ chairperson)
- Harrison Pali (Warner Music Group)
- Russell Baillie (The Listener)
- George Fenwick (Stuff)

== Independent Spirit award ==
The Independent Spirit award goes to an individual or group that has had "a lasting impact on the independent music community". Unlike the other awards, there were no pre-announced finalists or winner.

On the night the winner was revealed to be Carmel Bennett. Her career in the music industry has included Auckland venue The Powerstation, the Big Day Out festival, and more recently charity MusicHelps. In her acceptance speech she stressed that MusicHelps is "founded on science" and makes a difference to the music community. She also called for the government to amend the Copyright Act and to mandate local opening acts for international bands.

== Award ceremony ==
The Taite Music Prize award ceremony was held on 29 April 2026 and hosted by Sarah Thomson. Two of 2025's winners, Mokotron and Byllie-Jean, performed. The venue shifted to the New Zealand International Convention Centre and, for the first time, tickets were offered to the public. Over 500 were sold. Attendees included Paul Goldsmith, Minister for Arts, Culture and Heritage, and members of Parliament Chloe Swarbrick, Kahurangi Carter, and Reuben Davidson.
