= 2015 Taite Music Prize =

Music award ceremony

- Awarded for: The best NZ album released in 2014
- Sponsored by: Recorded Music NZ
- Date: 15 April, 2015
- Venue: Galatos, Auckland
- Country: New Zealand
- Hosted by: Lawrence Arabia & Charlotte Ryan
- Acts: Delaney Davidson; Don McGlashan
- Reward: $10,000
- Winner(s): Sines, by Jakob

Highlights
- IMNZ Classic Record: What's Be Happen?, by Herbs
- Website: indies.co.nz

The sixth annual Taite Music Prize was presented on 15 April 2015 at a ceremony in Auckland, organised by Independent Music New Zealand (IMNZ). The winner of the main award was Jakob for their album Sines. The IMNZ Classic Record award went to What's Be Happen? by Herbs.

== Main Prize ==
The ceremony and its main award share the "Taite Music Prize" name. This award recognises New Zealand's best album of the previous year (2014). The winner, Sines by Hawkes Bay post-rock band Jakob, was selected by a panel of expert judges.

Criteria for the award include artistic merit, creativity, innovation and excellence. Sales and popularity are ignored. The winners received $10,000 from Recorded Music NZ and recording time at Red Bull Studios.

2014 Taite Music Prize winner Lorde introduced the award, addressing a room of "some of the most technically talented, painfully underheard musicians New Zealand has to offer". She called the award "special" because it matters to "people who actually care about music".

=== Winner ===
Jakob had been surprised to make the Taite Music Prize final and hadn't expected to win. After the prize became theirs, guitarist Jeff Boyle said they were "honoured and blown away". They put the prize money towards an upcoming European tour.

Sines was the band's fourth album and their first in eight years. Over that time they had experienced failed recording sessions and injuries, including a time in 2008 when all three members were recovering from different hand and wrist conditions. In the early 2010s they had abandoned the idea of making the album at all. As Boyle put it, "the fact that we were forced to split the recording of this album over multiple studios and long periods of time, meant that the album ended up quite eclectic and dynamic, which is what our original vision was".

In 2014 local reviewers had called Sines "utterly beguiling, intelligently nuanced, repeat-play art-music of the kind that gives post-rock a very good name", and "capable of wholly enveloping you and spitting you out minutes later with no recollection of the lost time in between". One of the Taite judges, Pennie Black, said, "Listening to Sines, one is spirited away to a mystical place, from which you don’t want to return".

=== Nominations and finalists ===
After an open call for nominations, a total of 65 albums were entered. This list went to a vote of all IMNZ members and selected industry specialists, which found ten finalists who were announced on 19 February. @peace made an unprecedented third consecutive final and their leader Tom Scott became the first four-time finalist after a previous appearance with Home Brew. Tami Neilson made the first of her four finals (as of 2026).

2015 Taite Music Prize finalists
| Artist | Album | Label | Result |
|---|---|---|---|
| @peace | @peace and the Plutonian Noise Symphony | Young, Gifted and Broke | Nominated |
| Delaney Davidson | Swim Down Low | Outside Inside | Nominated |
| Electric Wire Hustle | Love Can Prevail | EWH Ltd. / Okayplayer Records | Nominated |
| Grayson Gilmour | Infinite Life! | Flying Nun Records | Nominated |
| Aldous Harding | Aldous Harding | Lyttleton Records/Flying Out | Nominated |
| Jakob | 'Sines' | Shoot The Freak | Won |
| Kimbra | The Golden Echo | Warner Brother Records | Nominated |
| Mulholland | Stop & Start Again | Mulholland | Nominated |
| Tami Neilson | Dynamite | Neilson Records | Nominated |
| Tiny Ruins | Brightly Painted One | Arch Hill Recordings/Spunk Records | Nominated |

=== Judging panel ===
The judges of the 2015 Taite Music Prize were announced at the same time as the finalists. They were:

- Nick Atkinson, NZ Music Commission board member and artist manager
- Pennie Black, 95bFM programme director
- Greg Churchill, DJ
- Sarah Crowe, NZ On Air
- Marty Duda, 13th Floor and Radio NZ
- Lucy Macrae, The Label
- Peter McLennan, Hallelujah Picassos, writer and IMNZ board member
- Henry Oliver, journalist and former member of Die! Die! Die!
- Julie Warmington, music publicist
- Natalie Wilson, (Music Supervisor, The Other Side Music)

John Taite (BBC America) was again named as the "11th man" of the otherwise New Zealand-based judging panel. As well as being an international music executive, John is the son of Dylan Taite, and played an instrumental role representing the Taite family during the establishment and early years' administration of the Taite Music Prize.

== IMNZ Classic Record ==
What's Be Happen?, the 1981 debut by Herbs, was announced as the winner of the second annual IMNZ Classic Record award a week before the Taite Music Prize ceremony. There was no public nomination process or vote. The award was introduced by IMNZ chairman Christy Whelan and then presented to six members of the band by Moana Maniapoto, whose album Tahi would win the same honour at the 2019 Taite Music Prize. She described the record as "music that told us about ourselves".

What's Be Happen? is recognised as a record that pioneered a blend of reggae with Māori and Pacific music. It included a tribute to Bob Marley, who died the year the record was released, as well as political songs addressing police harassment of Polynesians and South Africa's anti-apartheid struggle. The record's cover was a photo of the Bastion Point occupation being broken up by police in 1978, and it was released two months before the 1981 Springbok tour. Citing both its relevance in its time and its musical strengths, award judge Peter McLennan called What's Be Happen? a "strong set of six originals...still a crucial recording, to this day".

== Award ceremony ==
The Taite Music Prize ceremony was an invitation-only event held on 15 April 2015 at Galatos in Auckland and livestreamed on 95bFM's YouTube channel. Event MCs were 2010 Taite Music Prize winner Lawrence Arabia and music journalist Charlotte Ryan. Performers included finalist Delaney Davidson and Don McGlashan, who played after the awards were presented and expressed frustration at the loud crowd.
