= 2024 Taite Music Prize =

Music award ceremony

- Awarded for: The best NZ album released in 2023
- Sponsored by: Recorded Music NZ
- Date: 23 April 2024
- Venue: Q Theatre, Auckland
- Country: New Zealand
- Acts: Princess Chelsea; Lawrence Arabia
- Reward: $12,500
- Winner: Vera Ellen

Highlights
- IMNZ Classic Record: Compilation, by Look Blue Go Purple
- Best Independent Debut: Get That Shot, by JuJuLipps
- Independent Spirit Award: Teremoana Rapley
- Outstanding Music Journalism Award: Cushla Dillon & Andrew Moore
- Website: indies.co.nz

The 15th annual Taite Music Prize, along with four other New Zealand music industry awards, was presented on 23 April 2024 at a ceremony in Auckland, organised by Independent Music New Zealand (IMNZ). The winner of the main award was Vera Ellen for her album Ideal Home Noise.

The night's other winners were 1980s Flying Nun band Look Blue Go Purple, emerging rapper JuJuLipps, music industry stalwart Teremoana Rapley, and documentary makers Cushla Dillon and Andrew Moore.

== Main award ==
The ceremony and its main award share the "Taite Music Prize" name. Sometimes called the Taite Main, this award recognises New Zealand's best album of the previous year (2023). The winner, Ideal Home Noise by Vera Ellen, was selected by a panel of 13 judges who were not publicly named until after their decision was announced.

Criteria for the award include artistic merit, creativity, innovation and excellence. The prize included $12,500 from Recorded Music NZ (RMNZ).

=== Winner ===
Ellen accepted the award—alongside her producer, Ben Lemi—from 2023 winner Princess Chelsea and RMNZ representative Nick Atkinson (Supergroove, Hopetoun Brown). In her speech, Ellen compared the moment to a fever dream. She acknowledged "all the female artists that came before me whose shoulders I definitely stand on", and said, "I'm a product of the beautiful music scene here in Aotearoa where creativity and talent is abundant. Music is important to our mental health and quality of life."

=== Nominations and finalists ===
An open call for nominations ran from 17 to 31 January, and a total of 68 albums were entered. This list went to a vote of all IMNZ members. Ten finalists were announced on 5 March.

Tom Scott of Home Brew became the first seven-time finalist in Taite Music Prize history (including appearances with @Peace and Avantdale Bowling Club). Unknown Mortal Orchestra became the first artist to release five albums and make the Taite finals every time. Tiny Ruins achieved a fourth final in four albums.

Artist	Album	Label	Result
Dick Move	Wet	1:12 Records	Nominated
Ebony Lamb	Ebony Lamb	Slow Time Records	Nominated
Erny Belle	Not Your Cupid	Flying Nun Records	Nominated
Vera Ellen	Ideal Home Noise	Flying Nun Records	Won
Home Brew	Run It Back	Years Gone By	Nominated
Tom Lark	Brave Star	Winegum Records	Nominated
Mermaidens	Mermaidens	(Independent)	Nominated
Shepherds Reign	Ala Mai	Golden Robot Records	Nominated
Tiny Ruins	Ceremony	Ursa Minor	Nominated
Unknown Mortal Orchestra	V	Jagjaguwar Records	Nominated

=== Judging panel ===
Taite Music Prize judging panels are kept anonymous before the award is announced. In alphabetical order, the 2024 judges were:

- Rachel Ashby - 95bFM, NZ Music Commission
- Russell Baillie - critic, NZ Listener
- Pennie Black - Concord Music Publishing, IMNZ Board
- Madeleine Chapman - Editor, The Spinoff
- Matthew Crawley - artist, broadcaster, promoter
- Kiran Dass - freelance journalist
- Wairere Iti - NZ Music Commission, Māori Music Industry Coalition
- Taylor MacGregor - IMNZ Board, Save Our Venues
- Damon Newton - Auckland Live
- Karl Puschmann - critic, journalist
- Charlotte Ryan - critic, journalist, broadcaster (RNZ)
- Dianne Swann - NZ Music Hall of Fame inductee, IMNZ Board member
- Jana Te Nahu Owen - critic, broadcaster (RNZ), artist

== IMNZ Classic Record ==
Compilation by Look Blue Go Purple was the IMNZ Classic Record for 2024. It was originally released in 1991 (on Flying Nun Records) and included music from EPs that the band had released in 1985, 1986 and 1988. It was their first CD.

Look Blue Go Purple were announced as winners on 22 March, one month ahead of the award presentation. There was no public nomination process or vote. When their award was first announced the band responded with a statement saying, "We were a band of five good friends, in Dunedin, 40 years ago - to have people still appreciating our music after all this time is great. The 1991 compilation is pretty much the sum of our professional recording output. We treasure that time in our lives; being in a band together was special. Now, having the spotlight put on the contribution Look Blue Go Purple made in that seminal era is affirming, humbling and frankly wonderful."

The award was presented by Jan Hellriegel, who said, "There is something to be said about the authenticity and energy this wonderful band created. Like a classic car it's become more valued with age". Three of the band's five members (Kathy Bull a.k.a. Francisca Griffin, Kath Webster, and Lesley Paris) were able to accept the award in person.

== Auckland Live Best Independent Debut Award ==
The Best Independent Debut Award, sponsored by Auckland Live, went to rapper JuJuLipps for her five-track EP, Get That Shot. The award came with $2,000 prize money.

=== Nominations and finalists ===
Like the Taite Main, an open nomination round for the Best Independent Debut Award was held in early 2024. A shortlist of three finalists was announced before the award ceremony.

Artist	Album	Label	Result
JuJuLipps	Get That Shot	Bigpop Records	Won
D.C. Maxwell	Lone Rider	Danger Collective Records	Nominated
Soft Plastics	Saturn Return	(Independent)	Nominated

== NZ On Air Outstanding Music Journalism Award ==
In its third year, The Outstanding Music Journalism Award went to Cushla Dillon and Andrew Moore, directors of the documentary King Loser about the band of the same name. The award included $2,500 prize money.

A panel of industry experts considered 20 nominations and named three finalists. Other than the winners, both were from RNZ, including 2022's inaugural winner of the award, Tony Stamp.

Nominee(s)	Publication	Result
Cushla Dillon, Andrew Moore	King Loser film	Won
So’omālō Iteni Schwalger,	RNZ	Nominated
Tony Stamp	RNZ	Nominated

== Independent Spirit award ==
The winner of the Independent Spirit award for 2024 was Teremoana Rapley, MNZM (Upper Hutt Posse, Moana and the Moahunters, What Now, Mai Time) for her decades of contributions to New Zealand music and her advocacy for Pacifica artists. The award was presented by Brown Boy Magik, whom Rapley had mentored. Rapley has also won the IMNZ Classic Record award, with Moana and the Moahunters at the 2019 Taite Music Prize.

== Award ceremony ==
The 2024 Taite Music Prize ceremony, on 23 April, was the sixth to be held at Auckland's Q Theatre. Performers on the night included two previous Taite Main winners, Lawrence Arabia (2010) and Princess Chelsea (2023). Over 300 people attended.
