= 2020 Taite Music Prize =

Music award ceremony

- Title card from the 5 May livestream Title card from the 5 May 2020 livestream
- Awarded for: The best NZ album released in 2019
- Sponsored by: Recorded Music NZ
- Date: 5 May 2020
- Venue: Held remotely and livestreamed
- Country: New Zealand
- Presented by: Rt Hon Jacinda Ardern
- Hosted by: Sarah Thomson & Mikee Tucker
- Reward: $12,500
- Winner(s): Holy Colony Burning Acres, by Troy Kingi

Highlights
- IMNZ Classic Record: South, by Shona Laing
- Best Independent Debut: Relief, by Repulsive Woman
- Independent Spirit Award: Murray Cammick
- Website: indies.co.nz

The 11th annual Taite Music Prize, along with three other New Zealand music industry awards, was presented on 5 May 2020. Troy Kingi and the Upperclass won the main award for their album Holy Colony Burning Acres. Other winners were Repulsive Woman, Shona Laing, and Murray Cammick. The event, organised by Independent Music New Zealand (IMNZ), was initially intended to be held in Auckland until COVID-19 restrictions led to it becoming the first New Zealand music award ceremony to be held online.

== Main Prize ==
The ceremony and its main award share the "Taite Music Prize" name. Sometimes called the Taite Main, this award recognises New Zealand's best album of the previous year (2019). Criteria include artistic merit, creativity, innovation and excellence. 2019 Taite Music Prize winner Tom Scott gave a talk before the winner was announced, telling the finalists, "look back at what you've accomplished and congratulate yourself...You're here, you've been recognised by your peers. You can't do that slick underground shit anymore, that card's been played. If you want want to keep that obscure, unrecognised genius thing going on you're gonna really have to sabotage your next record."

=== Winner ===
Holy Colony Burning Acres, by Troy Kingi and the Underclass, was selected by a panel of nine judges who were not publicly named until after their decision was announced. The award was announced by Prime Minister and Minister for Arts, Culture and Heritage, Jacinda Ardern. Kingi also received a $12,500 cash prize and a year's supply of Red Bull products.

Reggae album Holy Colony Burning Acres is the third in Kingi's 10/10/10 project, which aims to release 10 albums in 10 genres in 10 years. The official results press release said, "The album dives into worldwide indigenous politics, namely, colonisation and the crippling effects it has on today's social climate."

In his pre-recorded acceptance speech, Kingi acknowledged all the finalists, artists on the longlist of nominations, and previous winners of the Taite.

=== Nominations and finalists ===
After an open call for nominations closed on February 7, a total of 54 albums were entered. This list went to a vote of all IMNZ members and ten finalists were announced on 12 March. The list included two previous winners - Aldous Harding (2018) and Lawrence Arabia (2010) - and the first of three consecutive appearances by Troy Kingi. Beastwars and Tiny Ruins both made their third (non-consecutive) final.

Artist	Album	Label	Result
Aldous Harding	Designer	Flying Nun Records; 4AD	Nominated
Louis Baker	Open	Louis Baker Music; Ditto Music	Nominated
Beastwars	IV	Destroy Records	Nominated
JessB	New Views	JessB; The Orchard	Nominated
Troy Kingi	Holy Colony Burning Acres	Triple A Records	Won
L.A.B.	L.A.B. III	Loop Recordings Aot(ear)oa	Nominated
Lawrence Arabia	Lawrence Arabia’s Singles Club	Honorary Bedouin Records	Nominated
Mermaidens	Look Me In The Eye	Flying Nun Records	Nominated
Miss June	Bad Luck Party	Miss June; Frenchkiss Records; The Orchard	Nominated
Tiny Ruins	Olympic Girls	Ursa Minor	Nominated

=== Judging panel ===
The judges of the 2020 Taite Music Prize were:

- Pennie Blair
- Nick Bollinger
- Chris Cudby (Under the Radar)
- Hinewehi Mohi
- Graham Reid (Elsewhere)
- Charlotte Ryan (RNZ)
- Pip Ryan-Kidd (IMNZ)
- Jeremy Taylor
- Sarah Thomson (95bFM)

== IMNZ Classic Record ==
South, by Shona Laing, first released in 1987, was 2020's winner of the IMNZ Classic Album award. This was announced on 2 April, ahead of the ceremony. On the livestream, the award was presented by Graham Reid, who noted the album's poetics, empathy and heart. Laing spoke about the album's important place in her career and the inspiration for songs including 'Soviet Snow' and 'Glad I'm Not a Kennedy'. She called the award "blissful...the sweetest award I think I’ve ever had."

== Auckland Live Best Independent Debut Award ==
The award for the best debut album of 2019 went to Repulsive Woman, for Relief. A $2000 prize was included. The winner was announced by Andrew Falstie-Jensen of Auckland Live, assisted on the livestream by his two children.

A shortlist of finalists was announced on 12 March.

Artist	Album	Label	Result
Tom Ludvigson & Trevor Reekie	Roto	Jazzscore	Nominated
Mousey	Lemon Law	Independent	Nominated
Repulsive Woman	Relief	Independent	Won

== Independent Spirit award ==
The winner of the Independent Spirit award for 2020 was Murray Cammick OMNZ, in recognition of a career that included founding Rip It Up magazine, Wildside Records, and Southside Records. His music journalism and photography were also acknowledged. This award was presented by Russell Brown.

== Award ceremony ==
The 2020 Taite Music Prize ceremony was originally intended to be held at Q Theatre, Auckland in April. With COVID-19 alert levels making public gatherings impossible, it instead became the first New Zealand music award ceremony to be staged online. On 5 May 2020 an online broadcast, presented by Sarah Thomson (95bFM) and Mikee Tucker (Loop Recordings and IMNZ), was livestreamed on YouTube and Facebook. Award winners appeared in pre-recorded videos and presenters included Jacinda Ardern, 2019 Taite Music Prize winner Tom Scott, Russell Brown and Graham Reid. NZ Musician called it a "a slick and engaging online presentation" and said that "the awards successfully maintained a near normal event format" over its hour-long running time. As of March 2026, 2020 remains the only year that the Taite Music Prize was not awarded in meatspace.
