= 2017 Taite Music Prize =

Music award ceremony

- Awarded for: The best NZ album released in 2016
- Sponsored by: Recorded Music NZ & Auckland Live
- Date: 18 April, 2017
- Venue: Wintergarden, Civic Theatre, Auckland
- Country: New Zealand
- Presented by: Wallace Chapman & Geneva Alexander
- Reward: $10,000
- Winner(s): Hauora, by Street Chant

Highlights
- IMNZ Classic Record: Boodle Boodle Boodle by The Clean
- Best Independent Debut: Swordfish by Merk
- Website: indies.co.nz

The eighth annual Taite Music Prize, along with two other New Zealand music industry awards, was presented on 18 April 2017 at a ceremony in Auckland, organised by Independent Music New Zealand (IMNZ). The winner of the main award was Street Chant for their album Hauora. The inaugural Best Debut Record award went to Merk for Swordfish, and Dunedin Sound pioneers The Clean received the IMNZ Classic Record Award for Boodle Boodle Boodle.

== Main Prize ==
The ceremony and its main award share the "Taite Music Prize" name. Sometimes called the Taite Main, this award recognises New Zealand's best album of the previous year (2016). The winner, was Hauora by Street Chant.

Criteria for the award include artistic merit, creativity, innovation and excellence. A new requirement for 2017 added that artists needed to be able to attend the ceremony in person. The winners received $10,000 from Recorded Music NZ, recording time at Red Bull Studios, and prizes described as a "year's supply" of both Red Bull products and Corona.

=== Winner ===
Hauora was Street Chant's second album following Means, which was a finalist for the 2011 Taite Music Prize. The prize was accepted by bassist Billie Rogers and drummer Chris Varnham, although the latter didn't actually play on the recording. Band leader Emily Edrosa (also known as Emily Littler) was in Los Angeles and learned about the win on Twitter.

It feels really good. When we were recording it I would say that I wanted to win the Taite and the Silver Scroll. That’s really un-Kiwi of me, but I did. So it’s cool, but it’s also really surreal. I had to get up and go to work this morning and catch the bus to downtown LA and I got there and my boss told me off for being late.

Maybe it’s because I’ve always been a little bit too much of an insecure arsehole, but I have this thing about being an outsider to the New Zealand music industry. I think what I really wanted was to be accepted. There’s a want to be legitimised in a funny way. And even though we’re on the punkier side, or we were, I take the songwriting part really seriously and I want to be taken seriously even though I’m a weird bitch on Twitter. Also, fuck it! It doesn’t really matter. But those awards are there, so why not want to win them? Or be happy to win them? — Emily Edrosa, abridged from an interview by The Spinoff

In a review for North & South written a year earlier when the album was released, Henry Oliver - who would become a member of the Taite Music Prize judging panel - said, "Hauora is a portrait of the lives of a certain breed of the twenty-something, creative middle/under-class; over-read and under-employed, drinking too much and earning too little, bussing from an existential crisis to a house party, walking from breakup to hangover."

=== Nominations, finalists, and judging ===
While most years' Taite Music Prize nominations are open to any New Zealand musicians to have released an original album in the previous year, a rule change in 2017 eliminated artists who were unlikely to be able to attend the Auckland ceremony. This rule was lifted again for the 2018 Taite Music Prize, when Aldous Harding accepted the award from London.

A nomination period ran for two weeks from January 25, with self-nominations explicitly encouraged by IMNZ. A total of 70 albums were entered. This list went to a vote of all IMNZ members, which found eight finalists. The overall winner was selected by a panel of judges who were never officially named. Journalist Henry Oliver was disclosed as a judge by RNZ.

2017 Taite Music Prize finalists
Artist	Album	Label	Result
Aaradhna	Brown Girl	Universal Music NZ	Nominated
Lawrence Arabia	Absolute Truth	Flying Nun Records	Nominated
Shayne P Carter	Offsider	Flying Nun Records	Nominated
Hopetoun Brown	Look So Good	Melita Music	Nominated
LEISURE	LEISURE	The Leisure Collective	Nominated
Lontalius	I’ll Forget 17	Label	Nominated
Pacific Heights	The Stillness	Warner Music	Nominated
Street Chant	Hauora	Arch Hill Recordings	Won

== IMNZ Classic Record ==
This went to Boodle Boodle Boodle, a 5-track 12" EP by The Clean, first released on Flying Nun Records in November 1981. It was announced ahead of the award ceremony on 30 March 2017. There was no public nomination process or vote. The award was presented by Doug Hood, who was a recording engineer on the EP, assisting Chris Knox.

Boodle Boodle Boodle was the third recording in Flying Nun Records's catalogue. It was made over two days with a total budget of $750. Despite receiving no commercial radio play, it spent 26 weeks in the national charts and was the highest-selling local single in 1982.

In 2017 The Clean were also awarded the APRA Legacy Silver Scroll and inducted into the New Zealand Music Hall of Fame. They had declined thee plaudits twice before, considering them to be awards from a mainstream music industry that had, in bassist Robert Scott's words, "shunned and dismissed" the band in the past. "Of course, with time they were proved wrong as our music has stood the test of time."

== Auckland Live Best Independent Debut Award ==
The award for the best debut album of 2017 went to Merk (Mark Perkins), for Swordfish. It was presented by IMNZ chairperson Matthew Davis. The award was new for 2018, with Auckland Live joining the Taites as a new sponsor. They funded a $2,000 cash prize and offered the winner a performance slot at the next Summer in the Square, held over 2017-2018. There was an open call for nominations early in 2017 but unlike subsequent years, no other finalists were announced.

== Award ceremony ==
The Taite Music Prize ceremony was held on 18 April 2017 and livestreamed on 95bFM's YouTube channel. For the first time the venue was the Civic Theatre's Wintergarden. A "new red carpet" was announced ahead of the ceremony.

Performers on the night were drawn from record label Lil' Chief, forming a one-off group to play songs by Classic Record Award winners The Clean, as well as the 2016 Taite Music Prize winner Silicon (Kody Nielson). MCs were Wallace Chapman & Geneva Alexander
