= Taite Music Prize =

Music prize in New Zealand

- Awarded for: Best album from New Zealand
- Sponsored by: PPNZ Music Licensing
- Country: New Zealand
- Presented by: Independent Music New Zealand
- Reward: $12,500
- First award: 2010
- Currently held by: Marlon Williams

Highlights
- Most nominations: Tom Scott
- Total: 17
- Total recipients: 17
- Website: http://www.indies.co.nz/taite-music-prize.html

The Taite Music Prize is an annual New Zealand music award event. A prize of the same name (sometimes called the Taite Music Main) is one of five to be awarded. It recognises the best New Zealand album from the previous year and was most recently won by Marlon Williams for Te Whare Tīwekaweka.

The prize is named after New Zealand music journalist and broadcaster Dylan Taite, who died in 2003. It was established in 2009 by Independent Music New Zealand (IMNZ) in conjunction with the Taite family, and first awarded in 2010. The Taite takes its inspiration from international prizes such as the Mercury Prize in the UK and the Australian Music Prize.

The annual event has grown over time and now includes the Independent Music NZ Classic Record award (first awarded in 2013), Best Independent Debut Award (2017), Independent Spirit Award (2019), and Outstanding Music Journalism Award (2022).

== The Taite Music Prize ==
The award carries a cash prize of NZ$12,500 and sponsors' prizes. It is primarily sponsored by Recorded Music NZ (formerly known as PPNZ Music Licensing). The award is judged on originality, creativity, and musicianship displayed on an album, rather than on sales or commercial factors.

Each award cycle begins with open nominations. Self-nominations are accepted. Albums must be:

- At least 6 songs or 25 minutes long.
- Original (no rereleases, no more than 25% covers).
- Released in the previous calendar year (e.g. the 2026 award is for albums released in 2025).
- Attributed to one artist or group – no compilations.
- Recorded by artists who are New Zealand citizens or permanent residents. For bands, at least half of members must qualify.
- Either self-released, or owned by a recording label that is NZ-owned or has an office in New Zealand.

The prize shortlist is decided by votes from a group of over 1,000 musicians (APRA members), industry figures and IMNZ members. The size of the shortlist has varied, but since 2019 there have been 10 albums each year. The winner is decided by a judging panel chosen by IMNZ.

=== Trophy and logo ===
The Taite Music Prize's T-shaped logo and trophy were designed by Stephen McCarthy. The intersecting linestrokes, one solid and one striped, represent commercial and independent music. A new trophy, made of metal and weighing eight kilograms, is made each year.

== Other awards ==
A second award was added at the 2013 Taite Music Prize. The Independent Music NZ Classic Record award honours a record that is at least 20 years old and now considered a classic. It aims to "acknowledge New Zealand’s rich history of making fine records that continue to inspire us and that also define who we are". Winners are selected by music media and industry specialists without any public nomination process or wider vote. The inaugural recipient of the Classic Record award was the Gordons' 1981 album The Gordons.

In 2017, a third award was added to the Taites. The Best Independent Debut Award (currently known as the Auckland Live Best Independent Debut Award) honours the best debut release of an artist or group on a member label of Independent Music New Zealand. The winner receives $2000 cash and other sponsors' prize. Like the Taite Music Prize award cycles begin with an open call for nominations (including self-nominations). The same judging panel selects the winners of both awards. Unlike the main Taite, entrants must be IMNZ members and EPs of at least 4 tracks are eligible. The first winner was Merk for Swordfish.

Since 2019 the Independent Spirit Award has been given to an individual to acknowledge their support for the local music industry and their personal contribution to its growth. The winner is selected by the IMNZ Board.

An Outstanding Music Journalism Award, currently sponsored by NZ On Air, was added in 2022. The winner receives a $2500 cash prize. The first recipient was RNZ music journalist Tony Stamp. Each year three or four finalists are announced ahead of the award ceremony. Documentary directors, podcasters, radio journalists and website creators have all been nominated for the award.

== History ==
The Taite Music Prize was first awarded in 2010. In 2009 Independent Music New Zealand, Phonographic Performances New Zealand (which has evolved into Recorded Music New Zealand) and members of Dylan Taite's family, notably his music executive son John, worked together to establish and fund the award. John has remained closely involved with the Prize, often as a judge.

"The Taite Music Prize is something I’m very passionate about. It’s a wonderful testament to my father and all he did for the New Zealand music industry. All that love he put into his work continues to resonate, all these years after he’s gone." — John Taite, 2021

Explaining why the award was named after Dylan Taite, Dylan Pellet of IMNZ compared him to John Peel. "He didn't care how much a record sold or what genre it was. If he loved it, he'd try to convince others to give it a listen. He was an enthusiastic champion of music he believed in, so naming this award after him was a good fit. The timing seemed right, too; these sorts of awards - celebrating artists rather than sales - are becoming more common around the world, with things like the Mercury Prize in the UK, the Polaris Prize in Canada, the Australian Music Prize and the Scottish Album of the Year."

With prize money originally set at $10,000 (and since raised to $12,500), the award was designed to focus on originality, creativity and musicianship. It was compared to the APRA Silver Scroll, which awards similar aspects of singles rather than albums.

The first ceremony included the smallest ever shortlist, five albums. The number has varied between seven and ten ever since. From 2019 on there have been ten finalists.

A record of 92 nominations was set in 2018, while the smallest (known) longlists contained 52 albums in 2014 and 2016. There were 83 in 2026.

=== Notable winners ===
Lawrence Arabia won 2010's inaugural Taite Music Prize, accepting it via video link from London.

In 2014, Lorde asked that the $10,000 cash prize, studio time and other sponsors' prizes be split among the seven other nominees, saying, "I think everyone is kind of sick of me winning stuff at the moment and other people are in more in need of the funds and exposure right now."

Brothers Ruban and Kody Nielson, both formerly of The Mint Chicks, have each won the Taite Music Prize for different music projects – Ruban as Unknown Mortal Orchestra in 2012 and Kody as Silicon in 2016. In 2026 The Mint Chicks' Crazy? Yes! Dumb? No! won the Classic Record Award in the first year it was eligible.

In 2019 Tom Scott of Avantdale Bowling Club won after being shortlisted for a record fifth time (which he extended to eight in 2026). His acceptance speech began, "Um. Fuck. I’ve lost this thing four times already."

The first album in te reo Māori to be honoured was WAEREA by Mokotron in 2025.

=== Venues ===
Auckland has hosted every live ceremony, with 2020's event having been held online. In 2026 the ceremony moved to the New Zealand International Convention Centre and, for the first time, offered tickets to the public.

- Plaything Gallery, 2010
- Sale Street Bar, 2011
- Q Theatre, 2012, 2019, 2021-2025
- Galatos Live, 2013–2016
- The Wintergarden, Civic Theatre, 2017–18
- Online only (due to the COVID-19 pandemic), 2020
- New Zealand International Convention Centre, 2026

== Winners and finalists ==
Year	Winner	Portrait	Finalists	Longlist size	Ref(s)
2010	Lawrence Arabia – Chant Darling		The Checks – Alice by the Moon; David Dallas – Something Awesome; Kerretta – Vilayer; Shapeshifter – The System Is a Vampire		
2011	Ladi6 – The Liberation Of...		Dudley Benson – Forest: Songs by Hirini Melbourne; Connan Mockasin – Please Turn Me Into the Snat; Julia Deans – Modern Fables; Die! Die! Die! – Form; The Naked and Famous – Passive Me, Aggressive You; The Phoenix Foundation – Buffalo; Street Chant – Means	73	
2012	Unknown Mortal Orchestra – Unknown Mortal Orchestra	Ruban Nielson	Andrew Keoghan – Arctic Tales Divide; Beastwars – Beastwars; David Dallas – The Rose Tint; She's So Rad – In Circles; The Bats – Free All the Monsters; Tiny Ruins – Some Were Meant For The Sea	87	
2013	SJD – Elastic Wasteland		@peace – @Peace; Aaradhna – Treble & Reverb; Collapsing Cities – Strangers Again; Home Brew – Home Brew; Lawrence Arabia – The Sparrow; OPOSSOM – Electric Hawaii	75	
2014	Lorde – Pure Heroine		Unknown Mortal Orchestra – II; Beastwars – Blood Becomes Fire; Sheep, Dog & Wolf – Egospect; The Phoenix Foundation – Fandango; David Dallas – Falling Into Place; @peace – Girl Songs; Jonathan Bree – The Primrose Path	52	
2015	Jakob – Sines		@peace – @peace and the Plutonian Noise Symphony; Aldous Harding – Aldous Harding; Delaney Davidson – Swim Down Low; Electric Wire Hustle – Love Can Prevail; Grayson Gilmour – Infinite Life!; Kimbra – The Golden Echo; Tiny Ruins – Brightly Painted One; Mulholland – Stop & Start Again; Tami Neilson – Dynamite!	65	
2016	Silicon – Personal Computer		Anthonie Tonnon – Successor; Marlon Williams – Marlon Williams; Nadia Reid – Listen to Formation, Look for the Signs; The Phoenix Foundation – Give Up Your Dreams; Princess Chelsea – The Great Cybernetic Depression; SJD – Saint John Divine; Unknown Mortal Orchestra – Multi-Love	52	
2017	Street Chant – Hauora		Aaradhna – Brown Girl; Hopetoun Brown – Look So Good; Lawrence Arabia – Absolute Truth; Leisure – LEISURE; Lontalius – I'll Forget 17; Pacific Heights – The Stillness; Shayne P Carter – Offsider	70	
2018	Aldous Harding – Party		Nadia Reid – Preservation; Grayson Gilmour – Otherness; Fazerdaze – Morningside; TEEKS – The Grapefruit Skies EP; Kane Strang – Two Hearts and No Brain; Mermaidens – Perfect Body; The Bads – Losing Heroes	92	
2019	Avantdale Bowling Club – Avantdale Bowling Club	Tom Scott	Alien Weaponry – Tū; Jonathan Bree – Sleepwalking; Julia Deans – We Light Fire; Marlon Williams – Make Way For Love; Mel Parsons – Glass Heart; Tami Neilson – SASSAFRASS!; The Beths – Future Me Hates Me; Unknown Mortal Orchestra – Sex & Food; Wax Chattels – Wax Chattels	67	
2020	Troy Kingi – Holy Colony Burning Acres		Aldous Harding – Designer; Beastwars – IV; JessB – New Views; L.A.B. – L.A.B. III; Lawrence Arabia – Lawrence Arabia's Singles Club; Louis Baker – Open; Mermaidens – Look Me In The Eye; Miss June – Bad Luck Party; Tiny Ruins – Olympic Girls	54	
2021	Reb Fountain – Reb Fountain		Anna Coddington – Beams; L.A.B – L.A.B IV; Nadia Reid – Out Of My Province; Ria Hall – Manawa Wera; Tami Neilson – Chickaboom!; The Beths – Jump Rope Gazers; The Phoenix Foundation – Friend Ship; Troy Kingi – The Ghost of Freddie Cesar; Wax Chattels – Clot		
2022	Anthonie Tonnon – Leave Love Out of This		Dianne Swann – The War On Peace of Mind; French For Rabbits – The Overflow; Lips – I Don't Know Why I Do Anything; Luke Buda – BUDA; Reb Fountain – IRIS; Sheep, Dog & Wolf – Two-Minds; Team Dynamite – Respect the Process; Troy Kingi – Black Sea Golden Ladder; Vera Ellen – It's Your Birthday		
2023	Princess Chelsea – Everything Is Going To Be Alright		Aldous Harding – Warm Chris; Avantdale Bowling Club – Trees; Erny Belle – Venus Is Home; Fazerdaze – Break!; Hans Pucket – No Drama; Marlon Williams – My Boy; Tami Neilson – Kingmaker; TE KAAHU – Te Kaahu O Rangi; The Beths – Expert In A Dying Field	61	
2024	Vera Ellen – Ideal Home Noise		Dick Move – Wet; Ebony Lamb – Ebony Lamb; Erny Belle – Not Your Cupid; Home Brew – Run It Back; Mermaidens – Mermaidens; Shepherd's Reign – Ala Mai; Tiny Ruins – Ceremony; Unknown Mortal Orchestra – V; Tom Lark – Brave Star	68	
2025	Mokotron – WAEREA		Anna Coddington – Te Whakamiha; DARTZ – Dangerous Day to be a Cold One; Delaney Davidson – Out of My Head; Earth Tongue – Great Haunting; Fazerdaze – Soft Power; Georgia Lines – The Rose of Jericho; Holly Arrowsmith – Blue Dreams; Mel Parsons – Sabotage; Troy Kingi – Leatherman & the Mojave Green	81	
2026	Marlon Williams – Te Whare Tīwekaweka		Dick Move – Dream, Believe, Achieve; Geneva AM – Pikipiki; Reb Fountain – How Love Bends; MĀ – Blame It On The Weather; Jazmine Mary – I Want to Rock and Roll; Phoebe Rings – Aseurai; Ringlets – The Lord Is My German Shepherd (Time for Walkies); Tom Scott – ANITYA; Womb – One Is Always Heading Somewhere	83	

=== Acts with three or more shortlisted albums ===
Although a number of acts and artists have been shortlisted multiple times, after sixteen annual awards there has not yet been a two-time winner of the Taite Music Prize. Troy Kingi and @Peace are the only acts to have been shortlisted in three consecutive years.

Artist	Shortlists	Wins	Years
Unknown Mortal Orchestra	5	1	2012, 14, 16, 19, 24
Lawrence Arabia	4	1	2010, 13, 17, 20
Aldous Harding	4	1	2015, 18, 20, 23
Troy Kingi	4	1	2020–22, 25
Marlon Williams	4	1	2016, 19, 23, 26
The Phoenix Foundation	4	0	2011, 14, 16, 21
Tami Neilson	4	0	2015, 19, 21, 23
Tiny Ruins	4	0	2012, 15, 20, 24
Reb Fountain	3	1	2021, 22, 26
David Dallas	3	0	2010, 12, 14
@Peace	3	0	2013–15
Beastwars	3	0	2012, 14, 20
Nadia Reid	3	0	2016, 18, 21
Fazerdaze	3	0	2018, 23, 25
The Beths	3	0	2019, 21, 23
Mermaidens	3	0	2018, 20, 24

=== People with three or more shortlisted albums under different names ===
Tom Scott has been shortlisted with four different acts, a record. Scott and Kody Nielson have both had two shortlisted albums in a single year.

Person	Acts	Shortlists	Wins	Years
Tom Scott	Home Brew (2), @peace (3), Avantdale Bowling Club (2), Tom Scott	8	1	2013 (2), 14, 15, 19, 23, 24, 26
Kody Nielson	OPOSSOM, Silicon, Unknown Mortal Orchestra (3) (Note: Excludes UMO albums before Kody Nielson was a full band member.)	5	1	2013, 16 (2), 19, 24
Luke Buda	The Phoenix Foundation (4), Luke Buda	5	0	2011, 14, 16, 21, 22
Gussie Larkin	Mermaidens (3), Earth Tongue	4	0	2018, 20, 24, 25
Haz Beats (Harry Huavi)	Home Brew (2), Team Dynamite	3	0	2013, 22, 24

== Independent Music NZ Classic Record award winners ==
Year	Winner	Record	Label	Year of release	Ref(s)
2013	The Gordons	The Gordons	Gordons	1981	
2014	Various artists	AK79	Ripper Records	1979	
2015	Herbs	What's Be Happen?	Warrior Records	1981	
2016	Upper Hutt Posse	"E Tu" (Note: "E Tu" is a 12-inch single.)	Jayrem Records	1988	
2017	The Clean	Boodle Boodle Boodle (Note: Boodle Boodle Boodle is a 12-inch EP.)	Flying Nun Records	1981	
2018	Headless Chickens	Stunt Clown	Flying Nun Records	1988	
2019	Moana and the Moahunters	Tahi	Southside Records	1993	
2020	Shona Laing	South	Pagan Records	1987	
2021	Pātea Māori Club	"Poi E" (Note: "Poi E" is a single.)	Maui Records	1983	
2022	Alan Jansson	Proud: An Urban-Pacific Streetsoul Compilation	Huh Records	1994	
2023	Micronism	Inside a quiet mind	Kog Transmissions	1998	
2024	Look Blue Go Purple	Compilation	Flying Nun Records	1991	
2025	Shihad	Killjoy	Wildside Records	1995	
2026	The Mint Chicks (Note: Ruben and Kody Nielson became the first winners of the main Taite Music Prize to also have an IMNZ Classic Record.)	Crazy? Yes! Dumb? No!	Flying Nun Records	2006	

== Best Independent Debut Award finalists and winners ==
Jazmine Mary, 2022's winner as a solo artist, was also a Best Independent Debut finalist in 2025 as one half of Pony Baby.

Year	Winner	Album	Finalists	Ref(s)
2017	Merk	Swordfish	(none)	
2018	The Miltones	The Miltones	Kendall Elise – I Didn’t Stand A Chance; L.A.B. – L.A.B.; Strangely Arousing – Strangely Arousing; Daniel McClellant – Anxious Heart	
2019	Alien Weaponry	Tū (Note: Also nominated for the main Taite Music Prize.)	Jed Parsons – Midnight Feast; Wax Chattels – Wax Chattels	
2020	Repulsive Woman	Relief	Tom Ludvigson & Trevor Reekie – Roto; Mousey – Lemon Law	
2021	Na Noise	Waiting For You	Amamelia – WOW!; Dick Move – Chop!	
2022	Jazmine Mary	The Licking of a Tangerine	Adelaide Cara – How Does This Sound?; Proteins of Magic – Proteins of Magic	
2023	TE KAAHU	Te Kaahu O Rangi	Wiri Donna – Being Alone; Erny Belle – Venus Is Home	
2024	JuJuLipps	Get That Shot	D.C Maxwell – Lone Rider; Soft Plastics – Saturn Return	
2025	Byllie-jean	Filter	Pony Baby – Pony Baby; VIDA – Aquatopialien; 花溪 Flowerstream – Flowers Dream	
2026	Geneva AM	Pikipiki	Babe Martin – Not A Bee, But A Wasp; Bub – Can’t Even	

== Independent Spirit Award winners ==
Year	Winner	Refs
2019	Bernie Griffin, founding IMNZ chairman and mentor	
2020	Murray Cammick, music journalist record label founder	
2021	Pete Rainey & Glenn Common, Smokefree Rockquest	
2022	Karyn Hay ONZM, broadcaster and author	
2023	Paul Huggins, producer and store owner	
2024	Teremoana Rapley, musician and presenter	
2025	Rohan Evans, founder, The Wine Cellar	
2026	Carmel Bennett, MusicHelps, Big Day Out, The Powerstation	

== Outstanding Music Journalism Award finalists and winners ==
Year	Winner	Finalists	Refs
2022	Tony Stamp, RNZ	Chris Cudby & Annabel Kean, Under the Radar; DJ Sir-Vere & Martyn Pepperell, Aotearoa Hip Hop: The Music, The People, The History; Jess Fu and Reuben Winter, 95bFM	
2023	Namnita Kumar and Nadia Freeman, Eastern Sound Stories	Gareth Shute, AudioCulture; Jess Fu & Amanda Jane Robinson, Amplified; Chris Cudby, Under the Radar	
2024	Cushla Dillon and Andrew Moore, King Loser documentary directors	So’omālō Iteni Schwalger, RNZ; Tony Stamp, RNZ	
2025	Chris Schulz, Boiler Room	Karl Puschmann, Antenna Media; Rosa Nevison, Sam Elliott & Flynn Robson, Newzician Magazine	
2026	Rosa Nevison, Sam Elliott & Flynn Robson, Newzician Magazine	Chris Cudby, Under the Radar; Hunter Keane, 95bFM	
