= 2023 Taite Music Prize =

Music award ceremony

- Awarded for: The best NZ album released in 2022
- Sponsored by: Recorded Music NZ
- Date: 18 April 2023
- Venue: Q Theatre, Auckland
- Country: New Zealand
- Hosted by: Sarah Thomson, NZ On Air
- Acts: Anthonie Tonnon; Micronism
- Reward: $12,500
- Winner: Princess Chelsea

Highlights
- IMNZ Classic Record: Inside a Quiet Mind, Micronism
- Best Independent Debut: Te Kaahu O Rangi, TE KAAHU
- Independent Spirit Award: Paul Huggins, Rough Peel
- Outstanding Music Journalism Award: Namnita Kumar & Nadia Freeman
- Website: indies.co.nz

The 14th annual Taite Music Prize, along with four other New Zealand music industry awards, was presented on 18 April 2023 at a ceremony in Auckland, organised by Independent Music New Zealand (IMNZ). The winner of the main award was Princess Chelsea (Chelsea Nikkel) for her album Everything Is Going To Be Alright.

The night's other winners were TE KAAHU (Theia), Micronism (Denver McCarth), podcasters Namnita Kumar and Nadia Freeman, and Paul Huggins.

== Main award ==
The ceremony and its main award share the "Taite Music Prize" name. Sometimes called the Taite Main, this award recognised New Zealand's best album of 2022. The winner, Everything Is Going To Be Alright by Princess Chelsea, was selected by a panel of ten judges who were not publicly named until after their decision was announced.

Criteria for the award, which came with a $12,500 cash prize from Recorded Music NZ, included artistic merit, creativity, innovation and excellence.

=== Winner ===
Princess Chelsea, who in New York at the time, appeared in a pre-recorded speech. Her award was presented by 2022 winner Anthonie Tonnon and accepted by Josh Worthington-Church and other members of her band.

=== Nominations and finalists ===
An open call for nominations began on 9 December 2022 and received a total of 61 entries. This list went to a vote of all IMNZ members, which found 10 finalists.

The finalists were announced on 3 March. Tom Scott of Avantdale Bowling Club (2019's winners) became the first seven-time finalist in the prize's history. Tami Neilson made her fourth. Te Kaahu O Rangi was the first album to be a dual finalist for the Taite Main and the Best Debut Award.

Artist	Album	Label	Result
Avantdale Bowling Club	Trees	Years Gone By	Nominated
Erny Belle	Not Your Cupid	Flying Nun Records	Nominated
The Beths	Expert in a Dying Field	Ivy League Records	Nominated
Fazerdaze	Break!	Flying Nun Records	Nominated
Aldous Harding	Warm Chris	Flying Nun Records	Nominated
TE KAAHU	Te Kaahu O Rangi	Theia Music Ltd	Nominated
Tami Neilson	Kingmaker	Neilson Records	Nominated
Princess Chelsea	Everything Is Going To Be Alright	Lil Chief Records	Won
Hans Pucket	No Drama	Carpark Records	Nominated
Marlon Williams	My Boy	Marlon Williams Music Limited	Nominated

=== Judging panel ===
The judges of the 2023 Taite Music Prize were kept anonymous until after all the awards had been decided. They were:

- Rachel Ashby, 95bFM breakfast host
- Pennie Black, 95bFM and artist manager
- Fi Carr, Radio Control
- Emma Hall-Phillips (a.k.a. DJ Aw B), promoter (Moments), Warner Music NZ
- Hunter Keane, Flying Out and 95bFM
- Laura McInnes (a.k.a. Left Hand Loz), co-editor, Sniffers
- Damon Newton, Auckland Live
- Lisa Paris, owner, The Label
- Martyn Pepperell, music journalist
- Jana Te Nahu Owen, critic, broadcaster (RNZ), artist

== IMNZ Classic Record ==
Inside a Quiet Mind by Micronism (Denver McCarthy), first released on Kog Transmissions in 1998, was announced as 2023's IMNZ Classic Album award on 23 March. There was no public nomination process or vote.

It was Micronism's only album, and had been re-released by Loop Recordings in 2017. By then McCarthy had spent years devoted to the Hare Krishna movement, and needed to be convinced that there would be any interest in his "ancient New Zealand techno record".

When the award was first announced, McCarthy said, "This acknowledgment of my small contribution to NZ music is wildly misplaced — so it is received with great shock and even greater humility and gratitude."

== Auckland Live Best Independent Debut Award ==
The award for the best debut album of 2022 went to TE KAAHU, for Te Kaahu O Rangi, which was also a finalist for the Taite Main. TE KAAHU is a project of singer Theia, real name Em-Haley Walker.

Walker said that being acknowledged was "really special" and explained that the Te Kaahu name came from her late grandmother. She described the album, which is entirely in the Ngāti Tipa dialect of te reo Māori, as "intended as a way to pass on whakapapa and pūrākau".

The award came with $2000 prize money from Auckland Live.

=== Nominations and finalists ===
Like the Taite Main, an open nomination round for the Best Independent Debut Award was held from December 2022, and IMNZ's membership then voted to find the finalists. Te Kaahu O Rangi was also a finalist for the Taite Main.

Artist	Album	Label	Result
Wiri Donna	Being Alone	Independent/DRM	Nominated
Erny Belle	Venus Is Home	Flying Nun Records	Nominated
TE KAAHU	Te Kaahu O Rangi	Theia Music Ltd	Won

== Independent Spirit award ==
The winner of the Independent Spirit award for 2023 was Paul Huggins, founder of Rough Peel Music and Rough Peel Records, and former owner of Real Groovy's Christchurch store. The award recognised over two decades spent supporting and encouraging a large number of local artists.

The award was presented by Warren Maxwell (Fat Freddy's Drop) and Huggins accepted it alongside his partner and son. He had been diagnosed with brain cancer the previous year, and died less than three months later, on July 3.

== NZ On Air Outstanding Music Journalism Award ==
In its second year the NZ On Air Outstanding Music Journalism Award, and a $2,500 cash prize, went to Namnita Kumar and Nadia Freeman for the Eastern Sound Stories podcast. The podcast was produced by produced by Eastern Sound Collective and Radio Active.

In a change from the previous year, there was an open call for nominations. Four finalists were announced ahead of the award ceremony.

Nominee	Publication	Result
Chris Cudby	Under The Radar	Nominated
Jess Fu & Amanda Jane Robinson	Amplified	Nominated
Namnita Kumar & Nadia Freeman	Eastern Sound Stories	Won
Gareth Shute	AudioCulture	Nominated

== Award ceremony ==
The Taite Music Prize ceremony was held on 18 April 2023 at Auckland's Q Theatre. The host was Sarah Thomson from NZ On Air and performers included Anthonie Tonnon, winner of the 2022 Taite Music Prize, and Micronism, winner of the night's IMNZ Classic Record award. Over 300 people attended.
