= 2021 Taite Music Prize =

Music award ceremony

- Awarded for: The best NZ album released in 2020
- Sponsored by: Recorded Music NZ
- Date: 20 April 2021
- Venue: Q Theatre
- Country: New Zealand
- Hosted by: Sarah Thomson
- Acts: Pātea Māori Club; Troy Kingi; Na Noise
- Reward: $12,500
- Winner: Reb Fountain. by Reb Fountain

Highlights
- IMNZ Classic Record: "Poi E", by Pātea Māori Club
- Best Independent Debut: Waiting For You, by Na Noise
- Independent Spirit Award: Pete Rainey & Glenn Common (Smokefree Rockquest)
- Website: indies.co.nz

The 12th annual Taite Music Prize, along with three other New Zealand music industry awards, was presented on 20 April 2021 at a ceremony in Auckland, organised by Independent Music New Zealand (IMNZ). The winner of the main award was Reb Fountain for her self-titled album Reb Fountain. The night's other winners were Pātea Māori Club, Na Noise, and the long-time runners of Smokefree Rockquest, Pete Rainey and Glenn Common.

== Main Prize ==
The ceremony and its main award share the "Taite Music Prize" name. Sometimes called the Taite Main, this award recognises New Zealand's best album of the previous year (2020). The winner, Reb Fountain by Reb Fountain, was selected by a panel of twelve judges who were not publicly named until after their decision was announced.

Criteria for the award, which came with a cash prize of $12,500 from Recorded Music NZ, include artistic merit, creativity, innovation and excellence.

=== Winner ===
In her acceptance speech American-born Fountain, who moved to New Zealand in 1979 with her family, said "I’ve always felt like an underdog. Being a migrant, I've always felt like I’ve missed something or have not belonged. To be honoured in this way, it feels like I belong. It is really special."

Judging panel member Sarah Illingworth said, "Reb Fountain sees its eponymous creator at the top of her game – or perhaps preparing to climb to new and headier peaks. The album and Reb's path to releasing it captures the independent spirit championed by the Taite Music Prize while sparkling with the high caliber of production and performance that makes an artist a star."

It's a great honour, and also quite strange. Peer recognition through awards is wonderful. It's also important to see an award is just one way of recognising the work. You have to be careful of thinking awards are a marker of who you are, of whether you achieved success. It’s beautiful and special but you are equally as valuable without it. I have to hold both spaces – the genuine gratitude I feel for being honoured and the knowledge that it’s the work that is important. I do think it can help a ‘career’ because our industry values the accolades. It’s great when you can add to your bio that you’ve won something, because somewhere out there that stuff is valued. And it is cool, but it’s not everything. — Reb Fountain, Interview with NZ Musician (abridged)

=== Nominations and finalists ===
An open call for nominations ran from 13 January to 8 February. This list went to a vote of all IMNZ members which found ten finalists. They were announced on 12 March. Troy Kingi, 2020's winner, became the first current holder of the Taite Music Prize to return as a finalist the next year.

2021 Taite Music Prize finalists
Artist	Album	Label	Result
The Beths	Jump Rope Gazers	Carpark Records	Nominated
Anna Coddington	Beams	Loop Recordings	Nominated
Reb Fountain	Reb Fountain	Flying Nun Records	Won
Ria Hall	Manawa Wera	Loop Recordings	Nominated
Troy Kingi	The Ghost of Freddie Cesar	AAA Records	Nominated
L.A.B.	L.A.B. IV	Loop Recordings	Nominated
Tami Neilson	Chickaboom!	Neilson Records	Nominated
The Phoenix Foundation	Friend Ship	Phoenix Foundation Ltd. / UMG	Nominated
Nadia Reid	Out Of My Province	Slow Time Records	Nominated
Wax Chattels	Clot	Flying Nun Records	Nominated

=== Judging panel ===
The judges of the 2021 Taite Music Prize were:

- Nick Bollinger
- Savina Fountain (no relation to Reb)
- Sarah Illingworth
- Karl Lock
- Nadia Marsh
- Rebekah Ngatae
- Hamish Pinkham
- Charlotte Ryan
- Pip Ryan-Kidd
- Jeremy Taylor
- Sarah Thomson
- Mikee Tucker

== IMNZ Classic Record ==
"Poi E", a 12" single by Pātea Māori Club first released in 1983, was announced as 2021's winner of the IMNZ Classic Album award on 1 April. There was no public nomination process or vote.

The modern day Pātea Māori Club, including some members who are heard on "Poi E", performed to a standing ovation at the award ceremony. The song's composers, Māui Dalvanius Prime and Ngoi Pēwhairangi, had died in 2002 and 1985 respectively.

== Auckland Live Best Independent Debut Award ==
The award for the best debut album released in 2020 went to Na Noise, for Waiting For You. Like the Taite Main, the three finalists for the Best Independent Debut Award were found through a vote of IMNZ's full membership. They were announced about five weeks before the award ceremony. Guitarist Hariet Ellis, a member of both Na Noise and Dick Move, was a double finalist.

2021 Best Independent Debut Award finalists
Artist	Album	Label	Result
Amamelia	WOW!	Sunreturn	Nominated
Dick Move	Chop!	1:12 Records	Nominated
Na Noise	Waiting For You	1:12 Records	Won

== Independent Spirit award ==
In recognition of the 33 years that they had spent supporting young musicians by running the national Smokefree Rockquest competition, Pete Rainey and Glenn Common were joint winners of the 2021 Independent Spirit award. An annual competition for musicians at schools all around New Zealand, Rockquest had grown to include 40 regional competitions as well as national finals. Rainey described the pair as "humbled and thrilled", and said that Rockquest was not about them but about the "kids wanting to participate [and] get involved in the music industry".

== Award ceremony ==
The 2021 Taite Music Prize returned to being a live event after COVID-19 forced the 2020 ceremony online. It was held on 20 April at Q Theatre, Auckland and hosted by Sarah Thomson. Na Noise, winners of the Best Debut Album award, performed a version of 'Faster' from Reb Fountain's Taite-winning album. IMNZ Classic Record winners Patea Māori Club and Troy Kingi, winner of the 2020 Taite and a finalist again in 2021, also performed. The awards were attended by over 400 invitees.
