= 2019 Taite Music Prize =

Music award ceremony

- Awarded for: The best NZ album released in 2018
- Sponsored by: Recorded Music NZ
- Date: 16 April, 2019
- Venue: Q Theatre, Auckland
- Country: New Zealand
- Hosted by: Sarah Thomson & Mikee Tucker
- Acts: Merk; Moana and the Moahunters; Alien Weaponry
- Reward: $10,000
- Winner(s): Avantdale Bowling Club, by Avantdale Bowling Club

Highlights
- IMNZ Classic Record: Tahi, by Moana and the Moahunters
- Best Independent Debut: Tū, by Alien Weaponry
- Independent Spirit Award: Bernie Griffin
- Website: indies.co.nz

The 10th annual Taite Music Prize, along with three other New Zealand music industry awards, was presented on 16 April 2019 at a ceremony in Auckland, organised by Independent Music New Zealand (IMNZ). The winner of the main award was Avantdale Bowling Club, by Avantdale Bowling Club, led by five-time finalist Tom Scott. The night's other winners were Alien Weaponry, Moana and the Moahunters, and Bernie Griffin, who was the first recipient of the new Independent Spirit Award.

== Main Prize ==
The ceremony and its main award share the "Taite Music Prize" name. Sometimes called the Taite Main, this award recognises New Zealand's best album of the previous year (2018). The winner, Avantdale Bowling Club, was selected by a panel of 11 judges who were not publicly named until after their decision was announced. Criteria for the award include artistic merit, creativity, innovation and excellence. The winner received $10,000 from Recorded Music NZ.

=== Winner ===
With Home Brew and @Peace, Tom Scott had been a finalist in four previous Taite Music Prizes, but never a winner. Scott accepted the award on behalf of Avantdale Bowling Club from Dylan Taite's son, John Taite, and graddaughter Amelia. In his speech he said, "I want to thank Dylan Taite, Dylan Taite's family and I want to thank all the Dylan Taites out there."

=== Nominations and finalists ===
After an open call for nominations, a total of 67 albums were entered. This list went to a vote of all IMNZ members, which found ten finalists, who were announced on March 7. Six of them had been finalists before, with Tom Scott's fifth appearance setting an outright record.

2019 Taite Music Prize finalists
Artist	Album	Label	Result
Alien Weaponry	Tū	Napalm Records	Nominated
Avantdale Bowling Club	Avantdale Bowling Club	Years Gone By	Won
The Beths	Future Me Hates Me	Dew Process / Carpark	Nominated
Jonathan Bree	Sleepwalking	Lil' Chief Records	Nominated
Julia Deans	We Light Fire	Tigerhorse	Nominated
Tami Neilson	SASSAFRASS!	Neilson Records	Nominated
Mel Parsons	Glass Heart	Cape Road	Nominated
Unknown Mortal Orchestra	Sex & Food	Jagjaguwar	Nominated
Wax Chattels	Wax Chattels	Flying Nun Records	Nominated
Marlon Williams	Make Way For Love	Marlon Williams Music Limited	Nominated

=== Judging panel ===
The judges of the 2019 Taite Music Prize were:

- Russell Baillie - arts editor, NZ Listener
- Nick Bollinger - author and journalist
- Hannah Brewer - NZ On Air
- Chris Cudby - journalist, Under The Radar
- Savina Fountain - Auckland Live
- Leonie Hayden - The Spinoff
- Paul Huggins - Rough Peel
- Kirsten Johnstone - producer, RNZ
- Andrew Maitai - Powertool Records
- Graham Reid - journalist, Elsewhere
- Sarah Thomson - programme director, 95bFM

== IMNZ Classic Record ==
Tahi, by Moana and the Moahunters, first released in 1993 on Southside Records, was 2019's winner of the IMNZ Classic Album award. on 27 March. There was no public nomination process or vote. Graham Reid presented the award, noting the album's "innovative blend of traditional and contemporary sounds from the opening karanga and taonga puoro to reggae, rap, funk and synth-pop – which are a fresh today as they were two decades ago".

In accepting the award, Moana Maniapoto called it, "a surprise, and a great opportunity to look back and relive the memories and the experience of what it as like to put that album together [...] It was a love song to our people." She acknowledged many contributors to the band and album, especially Southside Records founder Murray Cammick, who would win the next year's Independent Spirit Award. Her bandmates Teremoana Rapley (another future Independent Spirit winner) and Mina Ripia also spoke, as did her former manager and ex-husband, Minister for Māori Development Willie Jackson.

The group performed two songs off Tahi at the award ceremony.

== Auckland Live Best Independent Debut Award ==
The award for the best debut record released in 2018 went to thrash metal band Alien Weaponry, for their album Tū. A shortlist of three finalists was announced before the award ceremony. Both Alien Weaponry and Wax Chattels were dual finalists, also in the running for the Taite main award.

Finalists
Artist	Album	Result
Alien Weaponry	Tū	Won
Jed Parsons	Midnight Feast	Nominated
Wax Chattels	Wax Chattels	Nominated

== Independent Spirit award ==
The inaugural Independent Spirit award went to Bernie Griffin, a founding member and first chairman of IMNZ, long time 95bFM host, owner of record distributor Global Routes, and performer of more than 40 years. The award was presented by Prime Minister and Minister for Arts, Culture and Heritage, Jacinda Ardern.

== Award ceremony ==
In 2019 the Taite Music Prize returned to Q Theatre, Auckland for the first time since 2012. The ceremony was held on 16 April and hosted by Sarah Thomson of 95bFM and IMNZ Chairperson Mikee Tucker. Performers included Merk, covering Avantdale Bowling Club's song 'Home', Classic Album Award winners Moana and the Moahunters, and Best Independent Debut winners Alien Weaponry.
