= 2018 Taite Music Prize =

Music award ceremony

- Awarded for: The best NZ album released in 2017
- Sponsored by: Recorded Music NZ; Red Bull
- Date: 17 April, 2018
- Venue: Wintergarden, Civic Theatre, Auckland
- Country: New Zealand
- Hosted by: Alex Behan & Geneva Alexander
- Acts: Taite Music Prize House Band (incl Yoko-Zuna, Anna Coddington, Joel Shadbolt, Randa); Headless Chickens
- Reward: $10,000
- Winner(s): Party, by Aldous Harding

Highlights
- IMNZ Classic Record: Stunt Clown, by Headless Chickens
- Best Independent Debut: The Miltones, by The Miltones
- Website: indies.co.nz

The ninth annual Taite Music Prize, along with two other New Zealand music industry awards, was presented on 17 April 2018 at a ceremony in Auckland, organised by Independent Music New Zealand (IMNZ). The winner of the main award was Aldous Harding for her album Party.

The night's other winners were Headless Chickens, whose acceptance of the Classic Record Award (for 1988's Stunt Clown) included a controversial on-stage sprinkling of human ashes, and The Miltones, who became the second-ever winners of the Best Debut Record award for their self-titled album.

== Main Prize ==
The ceremony and its main award share the "Taite Music Prize" name. Sometimes called the Taite Main, this award recognises New Zealand's best album of the previous year (2017). The winner, Party by Aldous Harding, was selected by a panel of ten judges who were not publicly named until after their decision was announced.

Criteria for the award include artistic merit, creativity, innovation and excellence. The winner received $10,000 from Recorded Music NZ, a year's supply of Red Bull, and recording time in Red Bull Studios, Auckland.

=== Winner ===
Aldous Harding's award was accepted live by two representatives, introduced as Ben and Julian. Harding appeared via video from London, where she was about to start recording her next album. She joked that the money would go towards repeating past mistakes. Writing for RNZ, Sam Smith had called Harding the favourite for the prize.

Singer/songwriter Aldous Harding must be the favourite, you would think, for her album Party. This album took the music world by storm last year, appearing in many best of the year lists and gaining two New Zealand Music Awards. Her unique and highly dramatic vocal style within the mellow singer/songwriter genre should appeal to the judges, and the fact no female singer/songwriter has ever won this award must also count in her favour. — Sam Smith, RNZ

=== Nominations and finalists ===
After an open call for nominations, a record total of 92 albums were entered. This list went to a vote of all IMNZ members plus a selected group of industry specialists, which found eight finalists, half of which were released by Flying Nun Records. This was the last year to not have ten finalists.

Finalists
| Artist | Album | Label | Result |
|---|---|---|---|
| The Bads | Losing Heroes | The Bads | Nominated |
| Fazerdaze | Morningside | Flying Nun Records | Nominated |
| Grayson Gilmour | Otherness | Flying Nun Records | Nominated |
| Aldous Harding | Party | Flying Nun Records | Won |
| Mermaidens | Perfect Body | Flying Nun Records | Nominated |
| Nadia Reid | Preservation | Spunk! | Nominated |
| Kane Strang | Two Hearts and No Brain | Dead Oceans | Nominated |
| Teeks | The Grapefruit Skies | Teeks | Nominated |

=== Judging panel ===
The judges of the 2018 Taite Music Prize were:

- Russell Baillie – NZ Listener
- Georgina Cervin – Auckland Live
- Savina Fountain – Ignite
- Silke Hartung – NZ Musician
- Alan Holt – NZ Music Commission
- Joost Langeveld – Big Pop Studios
- Sandy Mill – singer & DJ
- Teremoana Rapley – Artist
- Billie Rogers – 2017 winner (Street Chant)
- Hugh Sundae – Hollywood Theatre

== IMNZ Classic Record ==
Stunt Clown by Headless Chickens, first released in 1988, was announced as 2018's winner of the IMNZ Classic Record award on 23 March. There was no public nomination process or vote.

Music critic Graham Reid said, "That Stunt Clown is being accorded the Independent Music NZ Classic Record status at the forthcoming Taite Music Prize should come as no surprise given just how on that album they managed to weld together pop structures with rock aggression and a sure feel for dance rhythms. [...] But what stands up at this distance – 30 years! – is the strength of the memorable songs (Soul Catcher, Run Sheep Run with its driving percussion), the mood pieces (White Out), the strong pop elements (Untitled) and the angular cabaret of odd songs like Frank."

The award was presented by Russell Brown, music journalist and former flatmate of the band in their Children's Hour days, before forming Headless Chickens. He said ahead of the ceremony, "Literally no one in New Zealand was making music like this at the time – they had to invent it. The Taite judges got it right when they chose this album to honour." His speech recalled the public and media outrage that followed the Headless Chickens' win at the 1987 Rheineck Rock Award, which included $30,000 that went towards recording Stunt Clown, and another $30,000 for promotion and touring. He called Stunt Clown "a bridge between the dark sardonic experiments of the first EP and the pop success of Body Blow...the sound of a band imposing change on itself."

The award was accepted by band members who were in attendance with Rachael Churchwood, the widow of bassist Grant Fell who had died in late January, less than three months earlier. Chirs Matthews spoke on the band's behalf and they then played 'Untitled', which he called "the easiest song to play".

=== Controversial tribute to Grant Fell ===
While accepting the award, and before the band performed Untitled, Headless Chickens frontman Chris Matthews sprinkled some of Fell's ashes on the stage and received audible cheers. The award organisers were unaware that this would happen, as Matthews had only discussed it with Churchwood (Fell's widow), as a spontaneous idea on the night.

Matthews' actions were criticised by attendees including Moana Maniapoto, who described them as "bizarre" and "disrespectful", and said "I find it hard to believe that someone could grow up in New Zealand and think it is okay to do that. [...] Human remains are tapu". Taite finalist Teeks (Ngāpuhi, Ngāi Te Rangi, Ngāti Ranginui) said he was glad to have not won as he wouldn't have gone on stage for cultural reasons.

Churchward acknowledged the breach of tikanga but believed the tribute was appropriate. She said, "Grant was proud of his Ngāpuhi whakapapa, as am I of my own family's Māori heritage. We were not setting out to shock or offend anyone, but Grant wanted his ashes scattered in places he loved - and he loved being on stage playing music. I think anyone who knew Grant understands that he would have loved this. [...] We all come from different places and we don't adhere to every tradition. Music is a big part of our identity too."

Band member Rupert E. Taylor called the moment "magic" and said it was "really, really important" to have Fell on stage.

IMNZ confirmed that tangata whenua would perform a blessing at The Wintergarden.

== Auckland Live Best Independent Debut Award ==
The award for the best debut album released in 2017 went to The Miltones, for The Miltones. In a speech on behalf of the band, lead singer Milly Tabak called it "a really special thing to be able to create music". They were one of five finalists, and received $2,000 cash and the opportunity to perform at an Auckland Live event. The finalists had been announced in early March.

Best Debut Record Prize finalists
| Artist | Album | Result |
|---|---|---|
| Kendall Elise | I Didn't Stand a Chance | Nominated |
| L.A.B. | L.A.B. | Nominated |
| Daniel McClelland | Anxious Heart | Nominated |
| The Miltones | The Miltones | Won |
| Strangely Arousing | Strangely Arousing | Nominated |

== Award ceremony ==
The Taite Music Prize ceremony was held on 17 April 2018 at the Civic Theatre's Wintergardens, Auckland, and livestreamed by RNZ. It was co-hosted by Alex Behan (RNZ) and Geneva Alexander (95bFM). Around 350 people attended the invitation-only event.

An ensemble billed as the "Taite Music Prize House Band" played songs by previous Taite winners Street Chant and two 2018 winners, Headless Chickens and Aldous Harding. For each song, all four members of Yoko-Zuna were joined by guests: Anna Coddington (twice), and Randa and L.A.B.'s Joel Shadbolt once each. Headless Chickens themselves also performed.
