= 2022 Taite Music Prize =

New Zealand annual award ceremony

- Awarded for: The best NZ album released in 2021
- Sponsored by: Recorded Music NZ
- Date: 29 May, 2022
- Venue: Q Theatre
- Country: New Zealand
- Presented by: Sarah Thomson
- Act: Reb Fountain
- Reward: $12,500
- Winner: Leave Love Out Of This by Anthonie Tonnon

Highlights
- IMNZ Classic Record: Proud: An Urban-Pacific Streetsoul Compilation
- Best Independent Debut: The Licking of a Tangerine by Jazmine Mary
- Independent Spirit Award: Karyn Hay
- Outstanding Music Journalism Award: Tony Stamp
- Special Commendation: Alison Mau
- Website: indies.co.nz

The 13th annual Taite Music Prize, along with four other New Zealand music industry awards, was presented on 29 May 2022 at a ceremony in Auckland, organised by Independent Music New Zealand (IMNZ). The winner of the main award was Anthonie Tonnon for his album Leave Love Out Of This. A new award for Outstanding Music Journalism was presented for the first time, to Tony Stamp (RNZ). Jazmine Mary received the Best Independent Debut Award, Alan Jansson was honoured for producing the IMNZ Classic Record (1994's Proud: An Urban-Pacific Streetsoul Compilation), broadcaster Karyn Hay won the Independent Spirit Award, and journalist Alison Mau was given a Special Commendation.

== Main award ==
The ceremony and its main award share the "Taite Music Prize" name. Sometimes called the Taite Main, this award recognises New Zealand's best album of the previous year (2021). The winner, Leave Love Out Of This by Anthonie Tonnon, was selected by a panel of ten judges who were not publicly named until after their decision was announced.

Criteria for the award include artistic merit, creativity, innovation and excellence. As the winner, Tonnon received $12,500 from Recorded Music NZ. While accepting the award, he said, "The album is the pinnacle of what I’ve aimed for as a musician. It’s the novel to us musicians".

=== Nominations and finalists ===
In February an open call for nominations closed and all submitted albums were put to a vote of IMNZ members, musicians, industry figures. This vote found a shortlist of ten finalists.

Finalists were announced on 11 March. Troy Kingi, 2020's winner, became the second person to make three consecutive Taite Music Prize finals. Reb Fountain became the second person after Kingi to be both a finalist and the prize's current holder. Luke Buda made his fifth final (after four with The Phoenix Foundation) and Haz Beats (Harry Huavi) of Team Dynamite added a third final after two with Home Brew.

| Artist | Album | Label | Result |
|---|---|---|---|
| Luke Buda | Buda | Buda Records | Nominated |
| Vera Ellen | It’s Your Birthday | Flying Nun Records | Nominated |
| Reb Fountain | Iris | Flying Nun Records | Nominated |
| French For Rabbits | The Overflow | AAA Records | Nominated |
| Troy Kingi | Black Sea Golden Ladder | AAA Records | Nominated |
| Lips | I Don’t Know Why I Do Anything | Independent | Nominated |
| Sheep, Dog & Wolf | Two-Minds | Aphrodite | Nominated |
| Dianne Swann | The War On Peace of Mind | Bads Music | Nominated |
| Anthonie Tonnon | Leave Love Out Of This | Slow Time Records | Won |
| Team Dynamite | Respect The Process | Independent | Nominated |

=== Judging panel ===
The judges of the 2022 Taite Music Prize were:

- Annabel Kean – Sports Team, Under the Radar
- Damon Newton – Auckland Live
- Harrison Pali – Tahi (RNZ)
- Jasmin Ziedan – owner, BaseFM
- Jess Fu – 95bFM
- Karl Lock – manager, JB Hi Fi
- Lisa Jones – founder, muzic.net.nz (now Muzic.NZ); Aotearoa Music Industry Collective
- Mathew Crawley – manager, Flying Out
- Nadia Marsh – kaiarahi puoro/music co-ordinator, Te Māngai Pāho
- Sandra Hopping – manager, Marbecks / Ode Records

== IMNZ Classic Record award ==
Proud: An Urban-Pacific Streetsoul Compilation, first released in 1994, was announced as 2022's winner of the IMNZ Classic Album award on 31 March, ahead of the Taite Music Prize ceremony. There was no public nomination process or vote. The award was accepted by producer Alan Jansson, who along with Tim Mohan and Phil Fuemana was the main driving force behind the album's creation. Artists featured on Proud included Sisters Underground, whose single 'In the Neighbourhood' was recorded especially for the compilation, and Otara Millionaires Club, who as OMC would have an international number one with 'How Bizarre' the next year.

== Auckland Live Best Independent Debut award ==
The award for the best independent debut album to be released in 2021 went to Jazmine Mary, for The Licking of a Tangerine. The award was presented by Helaina Keeley from sponsors Auckland Live.

Like the Taite Main, an open nomination round for the Best Independent Debut Award was held in early 2022. A shortlist of three finalists was announced on 10 March, a few weeks before the award ceremony.

| Artist | Album | Label | Result |
|---|---|---|---|
| Adelaide Cara | How Does This Sound? | Example | Nominated |
| Jazmine Mary | The Licking of a Tangerine | Example | Won |
| Proteins of Magic | Proteins of Magic | Example | Nominated |

== NZ On Air Outstanding Music Journalism award ==
The Outstanding Music Journalism Award was new in 2022. With NZ On Air as its sponsor, it was established to recognise creative contributions and significant impact in coverage of New Zealand music. IMNZ chairperson, Pippa Ryan-Kidd, said that the award was established "in the spirit of Dylan Taite". The inaugural winner was Tony Stamp, presenter of The Sampler on Radio New Zealand. The award included a $2,500 cash prize. It was presented by Poppy Reid, of Rolling Stone NZ. Stamp was one of four finalists selected by the IMNZ Board and announced ahead of the ceremony.

| Nominee | Publication | Result |
|---|---|---|
| Chris Cudby and Annabel Kean | Under the Radar | Nominated |
| DJ Sirvere and Martyn Pepperell | Aotearoa Hip Hop: The Music, The People, The History podcast | Nominated |
| Jess Fu | Longer Player episode "Milk III – Reuben Winter" (95bFM) | Nominated |
| Tony Stamp | The Sampler, RNZ | Won |

=== Special commendation to Alison Mau ===
Alison Mau of Stuff received a special commendation in recognition of her work focusing on sexual harm prevention and the national music industry. Before presenting the Outstanding Journalism Award, presenter Poppy Reid conveyed the judges' special commendation to Alison Mau. This was in recognition of her work on Stuff under the banner of #MeTooNZ, reporting on sexual harassment and exploitation within the local music industry. Reid said, "Alison’s work, especially given how difficult the defamation laws are to navigate, is an outstanding contribution to this industry."

Mau's #MeToo reporting included investigations of Lorde's former manager, Scott MacLaughlin, during his time at Warner Music; Benee's manager Paul McKessar; allegations against an unnamed employee of MediaWorks radio station The Rock; and historical allegations against composer Jack Body.

== Independent Spirit award ==
The winner of the Independent Spirit Award for 2022 was broadcaster Karyn Hay, whose longlasting contribution to New Zealand music dated back to the early 1980s when she started hosting the television show Radio with Pictures.

Dave Dobbyn introduced Hay with a speech describing her career, including Radio with Pictures, Kiwi FM, documentaries, and RNZ. In her own speech Hay said, "Being proud of something you have championed isn’t how I see the world. I just do it, and hope the end result will hit home". She ended with an exhortation to "keep kicking against the pricks".

Interviewed on the day of the awards, Hay said, "I just wish everybody had untold money, that they could create as much art as they wanted to, that they were protected from having to do shit that they didn't want to have to do...It's a unique in environment in New Zealand, and it hasn't changed. Artists have to do other stuff, and to be able to just concentrate on the one thing that drives you - that's what I wish artists could do in this country."

== Award ceremony ==
The Taite Music Prize ceremony was held on 29 May 2022 at Q Theatre, Auckland. It had originally been scheduled for 20 April, but the COVID-19 Protection Framework made that date unworkable.

The ceremony opened with a performance from Reb Fountain, holder of the 2021 Taite Music Prize and a finalist again in 2022. It was hosted by Sarah Thomson of NZ On Air. Other presenters were Sir Dave Dobbyn, Poppy Reid, Pippa Ryan-Kidd (IMNZ Chair), Helaina Keeley (Auckland Live), Jo Oliver (CEO of Recorded Music NZ) and journalist Colin Hogg.

== See also ==
- Australian Music Prize
