= 2012 Taite Music Prize =

Music award ceremony

- Awarded for: The best NZ album released in 2011
- Sponsored by: PPNZ Music Licensing
- Date: 20 April, 2012
- Venue: Q Theatre, Auckland
- Country: New Zealand
- Eligibility: New Zealand albums released in 2011
- Acts: Ladi6 & Julien Dyne (DJ)
- Reward: $10,000
- Winner(s): Unknown Mortal Orchestra (album), by Unknown Mortal Orchestra
- Website: indies.co.nz

The third annual Taite Music Prize was presented on 20 April at a ceremony in Auckland, organised by Independent Music New Zealand (IMNZ). The winner of the main award was Unknown Mortal Orchestra for their self-titled debut album.

The ceremony and its main award share the "Taite Music Prize" name. This award recognises New Zealand's best album of the previous year (2011), based on artistic merit, creativity, innovation and excellence. Commercial performance is specifically excluded. The winner, Unknown Mortal Orchestra by Unknown Mortal Orchestra, was selected by a panel of ten judges.

== Winner ==
Unknown Mortal Orchestra was a new project for former Mint Chick Ruban Nielson, and the winning album was its first. Now based in Portland, Oregon, he accepted the award via video and said he felt very appreciated. The prize included $10,000 from PPNZ Music Licensing, which he expected to spend on health insurance and making a new album.

Judging panel member Hugh Sundae said the album was "exciting and fucking awesome".

== Nominations and finalists ==
After an open call for nominations that ran from December 2011, a record total of 87 albums were entered. This list went to a vote of all IMNZ members (plus 20 other industry experts), which found seven finalists who were announced in early March. In the award's third year, David Dallas became the first two-time finalist.

2012 Taite Music Prize finalists
Artist	Album	Label	Result
The Bats	Free All the Monsters	Flying Nun Records	Nominated
Beastwars	Beastwars	Destroy Records	Nominated
David Dallas	The Rose Tint	Dirty Records	Nominated
Andrew Keoghan	Arctic Tales Divide	Brave Beluga Records	Nominated
She's So Rad	In Circles	Round Trip Mars	Nominated
Tiny Ruins	Some Were Meant For The Sea	Spunk Records	Nominated
Unknown Mortal Orchestra	Unknown Mortal Orchestra	Seeing Records	Won

== Judging panel ==
The judges of the 2012 Taite Music Prize were:

- Russell Brown (music critic and journalist, Public Address)
- Jon Bywater (programme leader, Elam School of Fine Arts)
- Leonie Hayden (editor, Rip It Up)
- Jeremy Morrow (Warner Music)
- Stephen O'Hoy (IMNZ / Amplifier / DRM)
- Charlotte Ryan (95bFM)
- Hugh Sundae (entertainment editor, New Zealand Herald Online)
- Richard Thorne (editor, NZ Musician)
- Andrew Tidball (editor, Cheese On Toast)
- Glenn Williams (Wammo, KiwiFM)

Damian Vaughan of APRA was the designated "Judge Wrangler" and John Taite, son of the prize's namesake Dylan, was the "11th man". He was the only judge to be based overseas.

== Award ceremony ==
The Taite Music Prize ceremony was held on 20 April 2012 at The Loft in Q Theatre, Auckland. This was the third different venue in three years. Around 200 people attended, including 2011 Taite Music Prize winner Ladi6 who played a DJ set with Julien Dyne.
