= 2011 Taite Music Prize =

Music award ceremony

- Awarded for: The best NZ album released in 2010
- Sponsored by: PPNZ Music Licensing
- Date: 20 April, 2011
- Venue: Sale Street Bar
- Country: New Zealand
- Act: Lawrence Arabia
- Reward: $10,000
- Winner(s): The Liberation Of..., by Ladi6
- Website: indies.co.nz

The second annual Taite Music Prize was presented on 20 April 2011 at a ceremony in Auckland, organised by Independent Music New Zealand (IMNZ). The winner was Ladi6 for her album The Liberation Of....

The prize recognises New Zealand's best album of the previous year (2011). Criteria for the award include artistic merit, creativity, innovation and excellence. The prize included $10,000 from PPNZ Music Licensing. The Liberation Of..., by Ladi6, was selected by a panel of ten judges.

== Winner ==
Ladi6, real name Karoline Fuarosa Park-Tamati, said, "The Taite award is such an honour [because] it's judged on true creativity and innovation. We want to make music listeners in New Zealand proud of us, and always hope to stand a little left of centre, the way Dylan Taite himself would have liked."

Judge Sam Collins called The Liberation Of... "a truly international quality album".

Ladi6 said that the prize money would be used "wisely", starting with a 6-7 month tour of Europe and the UK.

== Nominations and finalists ==
After an open call for nominations ran from 16 December 2010 to 21 January 2011, a total of 73 albums were entered. This list was considered by a panel of 75 IMNZ members and 29 other music industry specialists, which found eight finalists (expanded from five the previous year). They were announced on 10 March.

2011 Taite Music Prize finalists
Artist	Album	Label	Result
Dudley Benson	Forest: Songs by Hirini Melbourne	Golden Retriever Records	Nominated
Julia Deans	Modern Fables	Tardus Music	Nominated
Die! Die! Die!	Form	Flying Nun Records	Nominated
Ladi6	The Liberation Of...	What? Music	Won
Connan Mockasin	Please Turn Me Into the Snat	(Self-released)	Nominated
The Naked and Famous	Passive Me, Aggressive You	Somewhat Damaged	Nominated
The Phoenix Foundation	Buffalo	The Phoenix Foundation	Nominated
Street Chant	Means	Arch Hill Recordings	Nominated

== Award ceremony ==
The Taite Music Prize ceremony was held on 20 April at Sale Street Bar. 2010 Taite Music Prize winner Lawrence Arabia performed and John Taite, son of Dylan, was a special guest.
