= 2014 Taite Music Prize =

Music award ceremony

- Awarded for: The best NZ album released in 2013
- Sponsored by: Recorded Music NZ
- Date: 16 April, 2014
- Venue: Galatos
- Country: New Zealand
- Reward: $10,000
- Winner(s): Pure Heroine, By Lorde

Highlights
- IMNZ Classic Record: AK79
- Website: indies.co.nz

The fifth annual Taite Music Prize was presented on 16 April 2014 at a ceremony in Auckland, organised by Independent Music New Zealand (IMNZ). The winner of the main award was Lorde for her debut album Pure Heroine. The IMNZ Classic Record award went to Auckland punk compilation AK79.

== Main Prize ==
The ceremony and its main award share the "Taite Music Prize" name. The award recognises New Zealand's best album of the previous year (2013). The winner, Pure Heroine by Lorde, was selected by a panel of judges from throughout the local music industry. Criteria for the award include artistic merit, creativity, innovation and excellence. The prize included $10,000 from Recorded Music NZ, recording time at Red Bull Studios, and a year's supply of Red Bull.

2013 Taite Music Prize winner SJD gave a speech introducing the award and individually praising all the finalists.

=== Winner ===
Lorde's Pure Heroine Tour was in the US, so she accepted the award via video from Las Vegas, explaining that she was "about to play this really weird show by a swimming pool". The award was presented mid-week, between her two appearances at Coachella. She remembered playing her first ever show at Galatos, which was hosting the awards that night. Having won a lot of things recently, she offered the $10,000 prize money and free recording time to the other nominees.

I want to say how incredibly humbled and grateful I am that you decided our record was worthy of the Taite. The Taite is a huge honour and I am still very starstruck about winning it. It's awesome, and I'm humbled to be among the list of winners, and particular this year's nominees who are so strong. — Lorde

At the time, Pure Heroine was in the Aotearoa Album Charts for the 28th straight week, having entered at #1 and gone platinum in its first week. It remained in the national top 40 for 78 weeks. Lorde had already won two Grammys, including song of the year for Royals, and four New Zealand Music Awards.

One of the ten judges, Grant Smithies, said, "Lorde’s LP was a rare example of an underground pop record being so damn good, it went mainstream, not just here, but worldwide."

=== Nominations and finalists ===
After an open call for nominations ran from 3 December 2013 to 21 January 2014, a total of 52 albums were entered. This list went to a vote of all IMNZ members and other industry figures, which found eight finalists. They were announced on 1 April.

David Dallas and Tom Scott (Home Brew, @peace) became the first three-time finalists in only the fifth year of the Taites. There were second finals appearances for Beastwars, The Phoenix Foundation, and 2012 Taite Music Prize winners UMO.

2014 Taite Music Prize finalists
| Artist | Album | Label | Result |
|---|---|---|---|
| @peace | Girl Songs | Frequency Media Group/Universal | Nominated |
| Beastwars | Blood Becomes Fire | Destroy Records | Nominated |
| Jonathan Bree | The Primrose Path | Lil’ Chief Records | Nominated |
| David Dallas | Falling Into Place | Frequency Media Group/Universal | Nominated |
| The Phoenix Foundation | Fandango | The Phoenix Foundation/Universal | Nominated |
| Lorde | Pure Heroine | Universal Music New Zealand | Won |
| Sheep Dog & Wolf | Egospect | Lil’ Chief Records | Nominated |
| Unknown Mortal Orchestra | II | Rhythmethod | Nominated |

=== Judging panel ===
The judges of the 2014 Taite Music Prize were:

- Gary Steel (Metro magazine)
- T’Nealle Joie (Bang Bang Eche; owner of Christchurch venues The Darkroom and The Last Word)
- Grant Smithies (Sunday Star Times)
- Pennie Blair (95bFM)
- Sandra Hopping (Ode Records)
- Vicky Blood (Chairperson, NZ Music Commission)
- Jon Bywater (Elam School of Fine Arts)
- Duncan Greive (music journalist)
- Aroha Harawira (club DJ & George FM host)
- Andre Upston (Radio New Zealand)

Dylan Taite's son, John Taite (BBC America), was named as the "11th man" on the judging panel.

== IMNZ Classic Record ==
AK79, a compilation of Auckland punk music first released in 1979, was announced as 2014's winner of the IMNZ Classic Album award on 8 April. It was selected by a panel that brought together what IMNZ called "a broad section of music media/industry specialists". The award was presented by Kerry Buchanan of The Terrorways to the album's compiler, Bryan Staff of Ripper Records. Songs were a mix of demo tapes recorded for Staff's radio show on 1ZM and recordings made at Broadcasting House. When the announcement was made, Staff said, "Dylan Taite was a friend whom I respected so this is a great honour."

AudioCulture calls AK79 "the defining release of the thriving Auckland punk scene of the late 70s". In its original form it was a 12-track LP. It mostly featured music that was otherwise unreleased. By the time the album was available, "many of the bands that appeared on the album had either split or stylistically moved on".

Bands featured on the original AK79 were The Scavengers, The Terrorways, Proud Scum, The Swingers, The Primmers, and Toy Love. A 1993 rerelease made the compilation available on CD for the first time, and more than doubled the number of tracks to 25. It added Suburban Reptiles, The Features, The Spelling Mistakes, and The Marching Girls. The CD was distributed internationally and earned radio play in shows including those run by John Peel, Bob Dylan, and Little Steven.

Judges included Duncan Grieve, who said, "It's a collection of scrappy DIY pop, which feels like the first unified and exuberant shot from a rising young generation determined to make themselves heard. That sense of empowerment shines through every one of these sometimes derivative, often shambolic, always deeply felt recordings."

== Award ceremony ==
The invite-only Taite Music Prize ceremony was held on 16 April 2014 at Galatos in Auckland and livestreamed by the New Zealand Herald. Around 300 people attended, and performers included 2013 Taite Music Prize winner SJD, who also gave a speech about the prize.
