= Graham Reid (journalist) =

New Zealand journalist

- Born: Edinburgh, Scotland
- Occupations: Journalist; Author; Broadcaster; Arts educator
- Website: elsewhere.co.nz

Graham Reid is a New Zealand journalist, author, broadcaster, and arts educator. His music and film reviews have appeared in The New Zealand Herald since the late 1980s. His website, Elsewhere, provides features and reports on music, film, travel and other cultural issues. He is the author of two travel books, published by Random House.

== Career ==
Reid was born in Edinburgh, Scotland, as was his mother; his father grew up in New Zealand, the son of Scottish immigrants. Reid was the founding editor of Passages magazine. He then worked as a journalist with The New Zealand Herald for seventeen years before leaving to become a freelance writer in 2004. He has been recognised for his excellence in the field of journalism, as a multiple winner at the annual Qantas Media Awards and Cathay Pacific's travel awards. In 2003, he won the United Nations Association of Australia's Media Peace Award for his coverage of the volatile political situation in the Solomon Islands.

Reid was the New Zealand correspondent for Billboard magazine for five years. He has participated in music-related programs for Radio New Zealand, among other work as a commentator on radio. Since 2010, he has appeared as a presenter and featured writer at the Creative Hub, located at Auckland's Waterfront Writing Centre. In November 2012, he hosted a pop culture event titled "Shooting the Beatles and Creating the Sixties" at the Auckland Art Gallery.

When announcing Reid's choice for the top albums of 2013, Independent Music New Zealand (IMNZ) wrote of him as the "prodigious reviewer Graham Reid of Elsewhere". His website Elsewhere covers a variety of arts-related topics, including jazz and world music. The music journalism archive Rock's Backpages describes it as "a New Zealand on-line magazine about music, travel and the arts".

Reid continues to write articles and music, film and book reviews for the Herald. He has also written for the New Zealand Listener, The Australian, Metro, Art News, Real Groove, Idealog, Life and Leisure and Weekend magazine. In AUT University's 2013 study of The New Zealand Herald, on the occasion of the 150th anniversary of the newspaper's founding, Reid was named among six "terrific contributors to a masthead which symbolises the Auckland establishment".

His first book was Postcards from Elsewhere, which won the 2006 Whitcoulls' Travel Book of the Year award. In 2010, his book The Idiot Boy Who Flew was the winner of Whitcoulls' annual Readers' Choice Award. As an educator, Reid has lectured in journalism and feature writing at AUT, and in contemporary music at the University of Auckland.
