= Dudley Benson =

New Zealand musician

- Born: 1983; Christchurch, New Zealand
- Occupations: Singer; songwriter; bar owner
- Years active: 2006–present
- Labels: Golden Retriever Records

Dudley Benson (born 1983) is a New Zealand musician and bar director from Christchurch, New Zealand. Benson released his debut album The Awakening in 2008, through his own independent label Golden Retriever Records, following this up with Forest: Songs by Hirini Melbourne in 2010 and Zealandia in 2018. In 2014 he won an Arts Foundation of New Zealand New Generation Award. Since 2020, Benson has been a co-director of Woof!, a cocktail bar in Dunedin.

== Biography ==
Benson was born in Christchurch in 1983, and grew up in the Port Hills. Benson's family has a long history in the area, and he is descended from Etienne Francois Lelievre, who immigrated from Normandy to Akaroa in 1836. At the age of 10, Benson joined the Christchurch Cathedral Choir. Benson's early musical influences were pop musicians such as Kylie Minogue, and in his teenage years he idolised Icelandic musician Björk.

Benson enrolled in a composition course at the University of Canterbury, during which he began producing music independently. In his third year of university, Benson worked as a crew member on the film The Chronicles of Narnia: The Lion, the Witch and the Wardrobe (2005). During filming, Benson gave a demo to the actress Tilda Swinton, who was impressed in his work and advised him to leave Christchurch. In 2004, he moved to Auckland, enrolling in a pop songwriting course at the University of Auckland and began working at Marbecks Records.

In 2006, Benson started his own independent music label, Golden Retriever, and released two extended plays, both of which sold out a month after release. During this time, Benson performed as a supporting act for alternative musicians including Casiotone for the Painfully Alone and Animal Collective.

In 2008, Benson released his debut album, The Awakening, which discussed his colonial ancestry and losing his mother to suicide. To support the album, Benson embarked on a tour of New Zealand churches. In 2009, Benson presented A Performance in Openness, a commission by the Auckland Art Gallery in response to Te Papa's Rita Angus: Life & Vision retrospective, for which he performed nude.

In 2009 Benson enrolled in a Māori studies course at the University of Auckland. The following year he released Forest: Songs by Hirini Melbourne, an album of a cappella Māori language waiata composed by Hirini Melbourne, which focused on his concerns for native birdlife in New Zealand. The album was nominated for the 2011 Taite Music Prize, and in 2012 Benson partnered with independent label HEADZ to release his first two albums in Japan. Afterwards, Benson moved to Dunedin, where he spent eight years developing his third album Zealandia (2018). In 2014 he won an Arts Foundation of New Zealand New Generation Award.

In 2020, Benson and his then-partner Josh Thomas opened Woof!, a pub and cocktail bar near The Octagon, Dunedin. In April 2022, the bar was inundated with negative reviews and abuse after insisting that customers would continue to be required to use My Vaccine Pass as proof of their COVID-19 vaccination status despite their Instagram page saying “all welcome”. After the negative views received media attention, the bar celebrated its busiest week since opening. In the same year, the bar won the supreme establishment award at the Otago Hospitality Awards.

== Personal life ==
Benson lives in Dunedin with his ex-partner Josh Thomas, who formerly directed the Dunedin Fringe Festival. The couple separated in 2021. In 2015, the couple's Jack Russell Terrier Rupert received widespread media attention, after going missing and spending 13 nights lost in the Dunedin bush.

In 2021, Benson was a witness in the criminal trial of Sir James Wallace.

Benson's former father-in-law is New Zealand artist Nigel Brown.

== Discography ==
=== Studio albums ===
Title	Album details	Peak chart positions
Title	Album details	NZ Artist
The Awakening	Released: 10 March 2008; Label: Golden Retriever Records Ltd, HEADZ; Format: CD, digital download, streaming	—
Forest: Songs by Hirini Melbourne	Released: 1 November 2010; Label: Golden Retriever, HEADZ; Format: CD, digital download, streaming	—
Zealandia	Released: 10 August 2018; Label: Golden Retriever; Format: CD, LP, digital download, streaming	9
"—" denotes a recording that did not chart.

=== Live albums ===
Title	Album details
Live Series: Volume One	Released: 14 November 2011; Label: Golden Retriever; Format: CD, digital download, streaming

=== Remix albums ===
Title	Album details
Deforestation	Released: 3 November 2014; Label: Golden Retriever; Format: CD, LP, digital download, streaming

=== Extended plays ===
Title	Album details
Mushrooms & Toadstools	Released: 1 April 2006; Label: Golden Retriever; Format: CD
Steam Railways of Britain	Released: 26 July 2006; Label: Golden Retriever; Format: CD
The Orders, Medals & Decorations	Released: 14 November 2006; Label: Golden Retriever; Format: CD
Minerals & Rocks	Released: 15 November 2007; Label: Golden Retriever; Format: 12", digital download, streaming

=== Singles ===
Title	Year	Album
"Muscles"	2015	Zealandia
"(Glad I'm) Not a Kennedy"	2018	Non-album single
"Zealandia"	2018	Zealandia
"Rutu"	2018	Zealandia
"Cook Beleaguered"	2018	Zealandia
"We Could've Been Gods"	2019	Zealandia
"Matariki"	2019	Zealandia
"It's Ōtepoti's Fault"	2022	Zealandia
