= Phoebe Rings =

New Zealand pop band

Phoebe Rings is a dream pop band from Auckland, New Zealand, currently signed to Carpark Records. The band consists of vocalist Crystal Choi, guitarist Simeon Kavanagh-Vincent, bassist Benjamin Locke and drummer Alex Freer.

== History ==
Phoebe Rings began as the solo project of musician Crystal Choi, before expanding into a four piece. All members are former jazz students. In March 2025, Phoebe Rings announced their debut album Aseurai, which was released in June, along with releasing the singles "Drifting" and "Aseurai". The group has since released the singles "Get Up" and "Fading Star". The band supported The Beths on their fall 2025 North American headlining tour.

Aseurai is one of ten finalists for the 2026 Taite Music Prize.
