= Dick Move =

New Zealand punk band

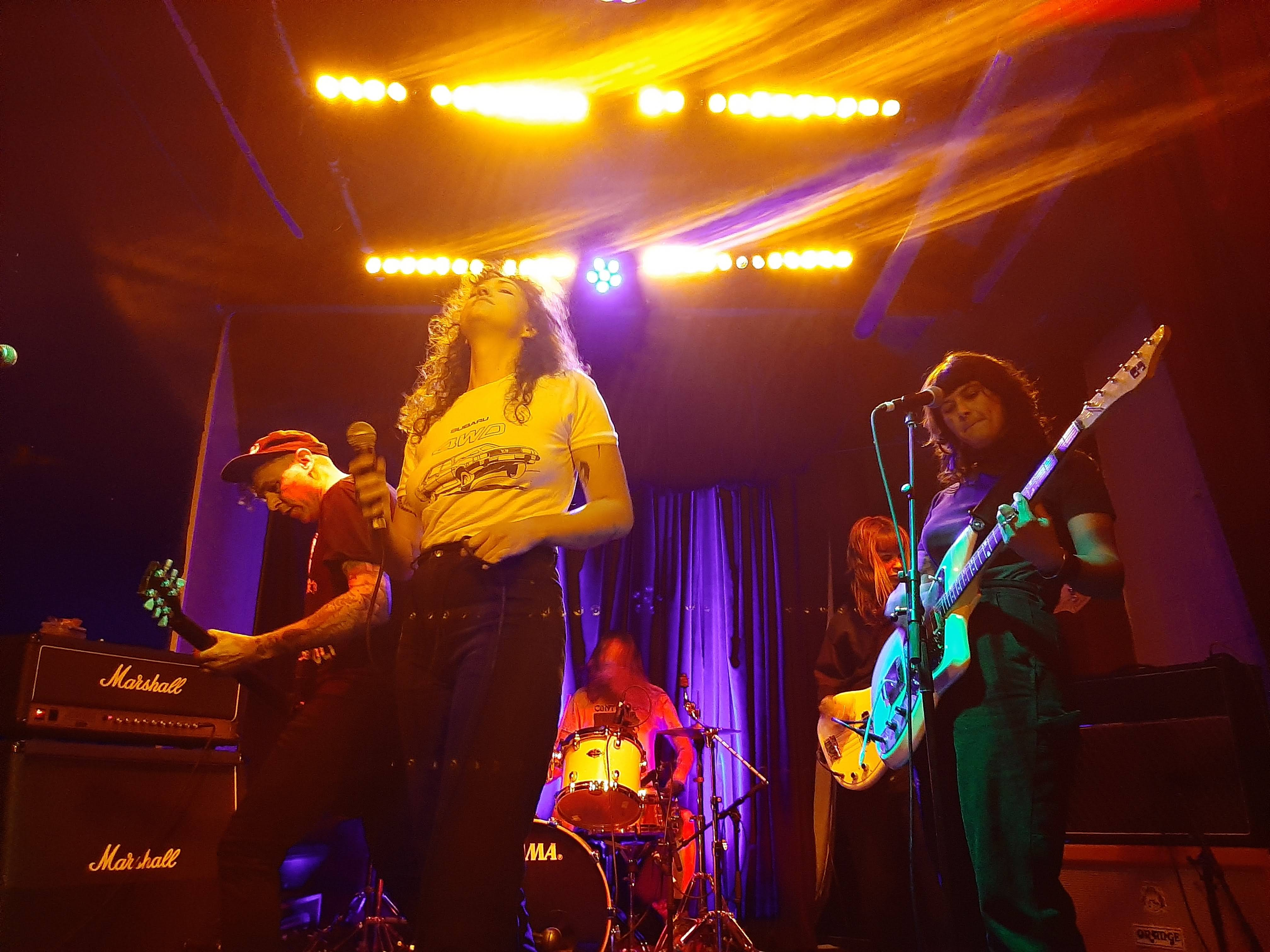
- Dick Move (L to R Rendell, Suttor, Boyes, Macrae, Ellis) in October 2023

Background information
- Origin: Tāmaki Makaurau/Auckland, New Zealand
- Genres: Punk
- Years active: 2019–present
- Labels: Flying Nun Records; 1:12 Records
- Members: Lucy Suttor; Lulu Macrae; Justin Rendell; Hariet Ellis; Luke Boyes

Dick Move are a five-piece party punk band from Tāmaki Makaurau, New Zealand. All three of their albums—Chop! (2020), Wet (2023) and Dream, Believe, Achieve (2025)—have charted in New Zealand's top 40.

Dick Move are known for their energetic performances, socialist and feminist politics, and short songs.

== History ==
Dick Move formed in 2019 from connections made between its members at Whammy Bar, a music venue on Auckland's Karangahape Road co-owned by Lucy Macrae. When Macrae, who was not a musician, decided she wanted to be a bassist in a band Justin Rendell and Hariet Ellis, who both worked at Whammy and had each played with a number of groups, offered to join her as guitarists. Ellis's partner introduced them to drummer Luke Boyes.

The last member to join, and fourth to have worked at Whammy Bar, was vocalist Lucy Suttor. After seeing her perform the Dead Kennedys song 'Too Drunk to Fuck' as part of a Whammy Bar punk rock karaoke night, with Rendell playing in the backing band, the four band members made multiple efforts to recruit her. She had been in bands during her school years in Gisborne and had entered Rockquests, but was not immediately keen.

After multiple approaches Suttor, who was already running a business as a masseuse and working as a part-time actor, relented and the band became a five-piece. They chose the name "Dick Move" after one of them used the phrase in a group chat.

=== Chop!: 2019–2021 ===
The band were quick to start playing shows, especially at Whammy Bar, and their debut single, also called ‘Dick Move’, was released in November 2019. In the first week of December it was #11 in the Hot Aotearoa Singles chart.

'Chop!', the first single from their album of the same name, appeared at #14 in the Hot Aotearoa Singles chart of 1 May 2020. A video for 'Jerk', compiled mostly from footage shot over the previous summer, was released the same month.

Despite the pandemic lockdowns of 2020, Dick Move played more than 20 shows that year, mostly in Auckland but also including their first two trips to the South Island. The second lockdown started on what was meant to be the first day of a new tour.

Debut album Chop!, described as "a 5-way collaboration over New Zealand's 2019/2020 summer", was released in October 2020, with single 'Femoids Attack' preceding it in September. It was recorded in the Auckland home of producer Peter Ruddell and contains 13 songs, all under 2 minutes long. In the week of its release, Chop! appeared at number 40 in the national album charts. Amongst New Zealand albums, it peaked at number 12. In a positive review, Maximum Rocknroll said "there is substance to this party platter". It was one of three finalists for the Best Independent Debut Award at the 2021 Taite Music Prize.

=== Wet: 2022–2024 ===
Dick Move were invited to support Foo Fighters on their planned New Zealand tour of 2022, chosen by the American band from a list of acts suggested by New Zealand promotors. At the time their largest audience had been around 600 people. The shows were cancelled after Taylor Hawkins' death, but Dick Move were retained when Foo Fighters played three shows in Auckland and Wellington in 2024.

Second album Wet was released in October 2023. Its 13 songs have a total playing time of under 23 minutes. In the release tour, the band's set list comprised the entire album, played in order.

Wet was one of ten finalists selected for the 2024 Taite Music Prize, which was won by Vera Ellen.

Rolling Stone rated Wet the tenth best New Zealand album of 2023 and ranked it #49 on their list of "The 80 Best New Zealand Albums of the 2020s So Far", when the decade was half over. Ambient Light gave Wet 4.5 stars, saying "This album is the kind of full-throttle party to break down the doors and wake up the neighbours – serious issues done with humour, a bit of nonsense, and eternal rage!"

In June and July 2024 Dick Move undertook their first European tour, playing 22 shows in 23 days.

=== Dream, Believe, Achieve: 2025 ===
In early 2025 Dick Move were a support band for the Wānaka and Auckland dates of Shihad's final tour of New Zealand, Loud Forever.

The band booked recording time at Roundhead Studios with returning producer Peter Ruddell and, for the first time, found themselves recording an album before all the songs were written. This led to the band's first experience of writing in the studio and recording tracks that they hadn't performed live.

Ahead of their third album, Dick Move released 'Fuck It' in July 2025. Listed as "F**k It", the song entered the Hot Aotearoa Singles chart at #7. On the 7" vinyl pressing, 'Nurses' is included as a second A-side and a live performance of 'Shut Your Mouth', performed with the Exploding Rainbow Orchestra, is the b-side.

'Nurses' was also given its own release as a stand-alone single in August, making it the second to precede Dream, Believe, Achieve. Its video was shot as the same time as 'Fuck It', with a storyline running through the pair. Around the time of the release of 'Nurses', publicly-employed nurses in New Zealand were undertaking industrial action to protest their pay and conditions. 'Nurses' explicitly calls for more funding of the health sector.

In September a second European tour included 11 shows in 12 days. Shortly after returning to New Zealand, the band released a third Dream, Believe, Achieve single, 'Scared Old Men'. Stella Reid, director of the 'Nurses' video, also directed 'Scared Old Men'. Fourth single 'Shut Your Mouth' followed in early November.

Dream, Believe, Achieve was released on November 14. As well as being on 1:12 Records, it was also the first Dick Move album on Flying Nun. It consists of 13 tracks, lasting about 25 minutes. The cover art is by Yolanda Fagan. In a preview, Noise11 said, "Dream, Believe, Achieve feels like the moment Dick Move fully arrive as an international punk voice".

Before the album's release, Dick Move announced that drummer Luke Boyes would leave the band after the New Zealand launch tour.

The launch tour includes nine shows in seven cities and towns. The scope of the tour and inclusion of three all ages shows was made possible by Dick Move being one of 20 inaugural recipients of a New Music Project Touring grant from NZ On Air.

The band are finalists for the 2026 Taite Music Prize for Dream, Believe, Achieve; the prize is set to be announced on 29 April 2026.

==== Album reviews ====
Muzic.NZ called Dream, Believe, Achieve "arguably the most important local album of 2025" and said that "the whole thing feels like a hardcore hit-fest". Australian website The Note said it is a "remarkable record" and a "rebellious ride of lucid lunacy". According to 13th Floor, "overall, Dream, Believe, Achieve is totally and utterly perfect for the current climate of today’s hostilities, broken systems, and political junk."

== Political stances ==
Vocalist Lucy Suttor says that Dick Move's songs are about "the things that we talk about at the bar at four o’clock in the morning … social injustice, politics, experiences as a woman, landlords, cops, men, holding figures of authority to account." In a review of their third album, The Spinoff noted, "Men and money, and especially men with money, are targets; urban workers are championed."

They have been described as "feminist-socialist" and "an essential party punk voice for women, working people, and for all those that are fired up to make change in the world".

The band describes 'Fuck It' as an "unbridled rejection of misogyny, control and the systems that enable them", and 'Nurses', which was released as public sector nurses took strike action, as "a necessary criticism of systems that prioritise profit over people...while hospitals remain understaffed, emergency rooms overflow, and frontline workers are stretched to breaking point."

== Discography ==
=== Singles ===
Release date	Title	Label	Peak chart position (Hot 20 Aotearoa Singles)
November 2019	‘Dick Move’	1:12 Records	11
April 2020	'Chop!'	1:12 Records	14
September 2020	'Femoids Attack'	1:12 Records	
21 July 2023	'Small Man, Big Tweet'	1:12 Records	
30 August 2023	'Feel Better'	1:12 Records	
3 October 2023	'Wet'	1:12 Records	
30 July 2025	‘Fuck It’	1:12 Records; Flying Nun	7
August 2025	‘Nurses’	1:12 Records; Flying Nun	
1 October 2025	‘Scared Old Men’	1:12 Records; Flying Nun	

=== Albums ===
Release date	Title	Label	Peak chart position (NZ Official Top 40)
16 October 2020	Chop!	1:12 Records	40
6 October 2023	Wet	1:12 Records	27
14 November 2025	Dream, Believe, Achieve	1:12 Record; Flying Nun	28
