= 2010 Taite Music Prize =

Music award ceremony

- Awarded for: The best NZ album released in 2009
- Sponsored by: Phonographic Performances NZ
- Date: 31 March, 2010
- Venue: Plaything Gallery
- Country: New Zealand
- Reward: $10,000
- Winner: Lawrence Arabia
- Website: indies.co.nz

The inaugural Taite Music Prize was won by Lawrence Arabia (real name James Milne) for his album Chant Darling. The award was presented on 31 March 2010 and honoured the best New Zealand album of 2009. As a new award, it was described as New Zealand's equivalent of the UK's Mercury Prize or the Australian Music Prize.

Milne accepted the award, which came with a $10,000 cash prize, via video from the U.K. and later called the Taite Music Prize "a rather perfect way of commemorating such a true character of the music community here in NZ, and I’m delighted to have any part of it whatsoever".

== Nominations and finalists ==
Independent Music New Zealand announced the five finalists on 2 February. As described by IMNZ, a "lengthy list" of albums had been submitted by their members and then submitted to "much deliberation and more than a few heated discussions".

| Artist | Album | Label | Result |
|---|---|---|---|
| The Checks | Alice by the Moon | Label | Nominated |
| David Dallas | Something Awesome | Example | Nominated |
| Kerretta | Vilayer | Example | Nominated |
| Lawrence Arabia | Chant Darling | Example | Won |
| Shapeshifter | The System is a Vampire | Example | Nominated |

== Judges ==
The panel of judges who selected the winning album were announced at the same time as the five finalists. They were:

- Sam Wicks, editor of Real Groove magazine
- Jim Pinckney, a.k.a. DJ Stinky Jim, founder of Round Trip Mars
- Dean Cameron, co-founder of 1157 Records
- David Farrier, TV3
- Kirsten Johnstone, Radio New Zealand
- Ross Flahive, The Edge
- Scott Maclachlan, Universal Music
- Francesca Rudkin, freelance music journalist
- Bernie Griffin, musician and founding chairperson of IMNZ
- John Taite, music executive and son of Dylan (after whom the prize is named).

== Ceremony ==
The first Taite Music Prize ceremony was held at Auckland's Plaything Gallery on 31 March 2010.
