= Anna Coddington =

New Zealand singer

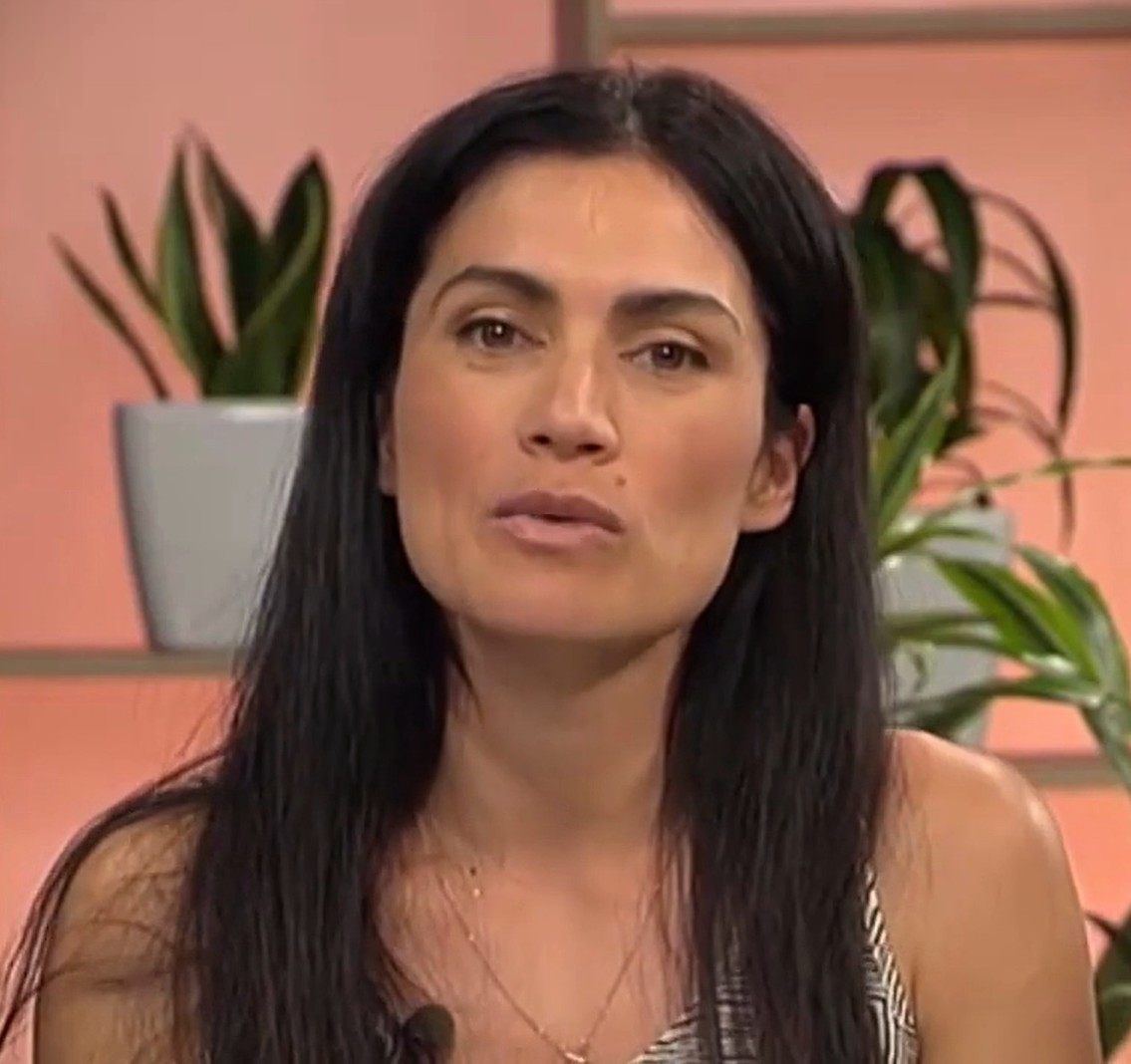
Coddington in 2017

Anna Coddington (born 14 June 1981) is a New Zealand singer-songwriter. She has released four albums. Her previous band 'Duchess', for whom Coddington was songwriter, singer and guitarist, also released a 6 track EP in 2005. In 2015, Coddington covered Terence Trent D'Arby's "Sign Your Name" for Katie Noonan's album Songs That Made Me.

== Biography ==
Coddington grew up in the seaside town of Raglan. She started playing drums from age 11, and guitar from age 14. By 16 she was fronting and writing for her first band, Handsome Geoffery, which won New Zealand's national student music competition, Smokefree Rockquest, in 1998. The band's members included future actor/director Aidee Walker, who would later direct a number of Coddington's music videos. A self-proclaimed nerd, she studied linguistics at the University of Auckland to masters level, and also is a 2nd dan black belt in Kyokushin Karate. She rarely takes time off training, as it provides a counterbalance to the self-absorbed process of music and "keeps her sane".

=== Personal life ===
She has two sons with her partner Dick Johnson, who's also known as "Magic J" and whom she collaborates with musically in CLICKS. She strives to learn and master the Māori language together with her children.

Coddington is studying law at Auckland University of Technology, and in July 2025 took out a national prize for Best Overall Individual Mooter.

== Discography ==
- The Lake (2008)
- Cat & Bird (2011)
- Luck/Time (2016)
- Beams (2020)
- Te Whakamiha (2024)
