= Sarah Thomson (actress) =

New Zealand actress (born 1985)

- Born: 17 June 1985 (age 40); New Zealand
- Occupations: Actress, puppeteer, writer
- Years active: 2005–present

Sarah Thomson (born 17 June 1985) is a New Zealand actress, known for playing roles in two series of the Power Rangers franchise, for her role in New Zealand's longest running soap opera, Shortland Street, and for playing a lead role in puppet show The Moe Show.

== Career ==
Thomson's early roles included playing the "rich bitch" character Tiffany in New Zealand reality show Living the Dream (2004), the role of Diane/Hydrax in Power Rangers S.P.D. (2005) and a role in the film Meet Me in Miami (released 2005). She has a bachelor of arts from the University of Auckland.

In 2006, Thomson and eleven others were chosen out of 260 applicants to participate in Auckland theatre company Silo Theatre's talent project for new actors, The Ensemble Project. Other participants included Morgana O'Reilly and Bonnie Soper. The company performed in a season of two plays. One of them was an interpretation of 'Tis Pity She's a Whore directed by Michael Hurst, and the other was a company-devised piece called Based On Auckland, led by director Oliver Driver. Both works played in the 2008 Auckland Festival.

Thomson appeared as undercover policewoman/nurse Tracey Morrison on New Zealand soap opera Shortland Street from 2007 to 2011. In a 2008 interview with the Rotorua Daily Post, she explained that her character would be leaving the police force after a brush with the Ferndale Strangler and returning to a nursing career in the upcoming season. Her character's 2011 wedding to James "Scotty" Scott featured in a Woman's Day list of favourite Shortland Street weddings.

During her time on Shortland Street she also played the role of Fran in the 2008 series Power Rangers Jungle Fury; she noted "it's a hilarious coincidence that I got pyjama pants and croc shoes as my main costume in both Power Rangers and Shorty Street". In 2013 she played a supporting role in a one-month run of Tribes at the Fortune Theatre, Dunedin, directed by Lara McGregor.

Beginning in 2014, Thomson wrote and performed for five seasons of the children's puppet television show, The Moe Show, performing and voicing Fern the Fairy. She describes The Muppet Show as a major influence and one of her favourite shows as a child. Following the show's final season, she performed in a radio show and live shows, and in 2022 an animated series.

From 2018 to 2021, she was the programme director of New Zealand's largest independent radio station, 95bFM, having initially taken the role on a three month secondment. She hosted an afternoon show each Saturday until September 2022. In 2021, Thomson moved to NZ On Air in Auckland, where she is the music contracts and funding coordinator. She hosted the annual Taite Music Prize award ceremony in 2022 and 2023. She is also a relief newsreader at Radio New Zealand.

== Film work ==
- Meet Me in Miami – Jennifer (2005)

== TV work ==
- The Moe Show – Fern (2014–present)
- Power Rangers Jungle Fury – Fran, Lepus (2008)
- Alt TV's Fresh Produce, The Residents & Lamest Girl Alive – Presenter/Herself (2007–08)
- Shortland Street – Tracey Morrison (17 episodes, 2007, core cast, 2008–2011)
- Power Rangers S.P.D. – Diane/Hydrax (2005)
- Living the Dream – Tiffany (2004)

== Other credits ==
- Alt TV – Station Music Producer (2007–08)
- Rip It Up, among others – Freelance Music Writer (2011–2015)
- 95bFM – ex-Breakfast Producer; ex-Programme Director (2018-2021); Saturday 2–4pm host (2015–present)
