= Q Theatre, Auckland =

Theatre in Auckland, New Zealand

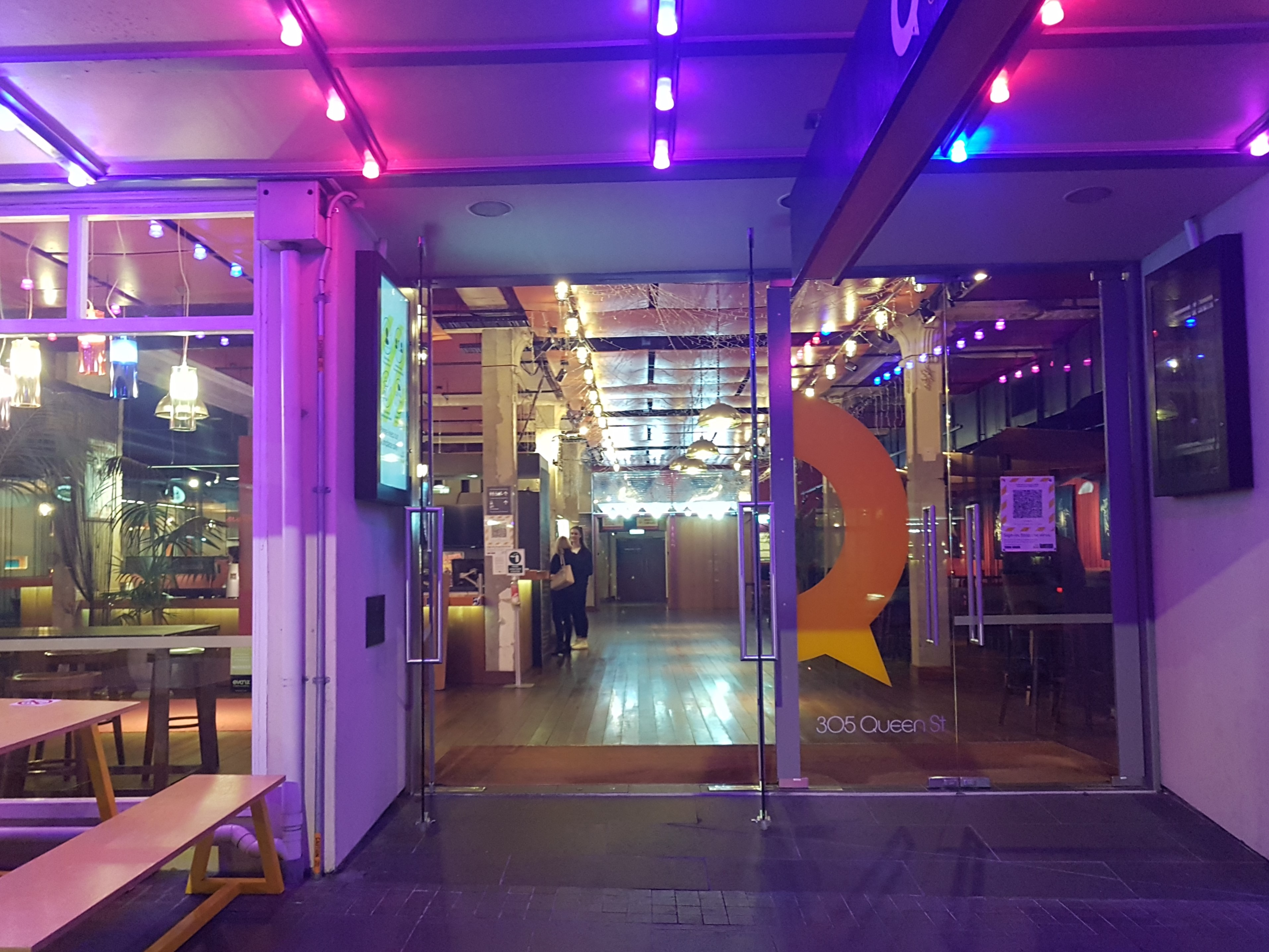
Queen street entrance

Q Theatre is theatre facility on Queen St in central Auckland, New Zealand, with two performance spaces. It regularly presents work from annual events in Auckland such New Zealand International Comedy Festival, Tempo Dance Festival and Auckland Arts Festival.

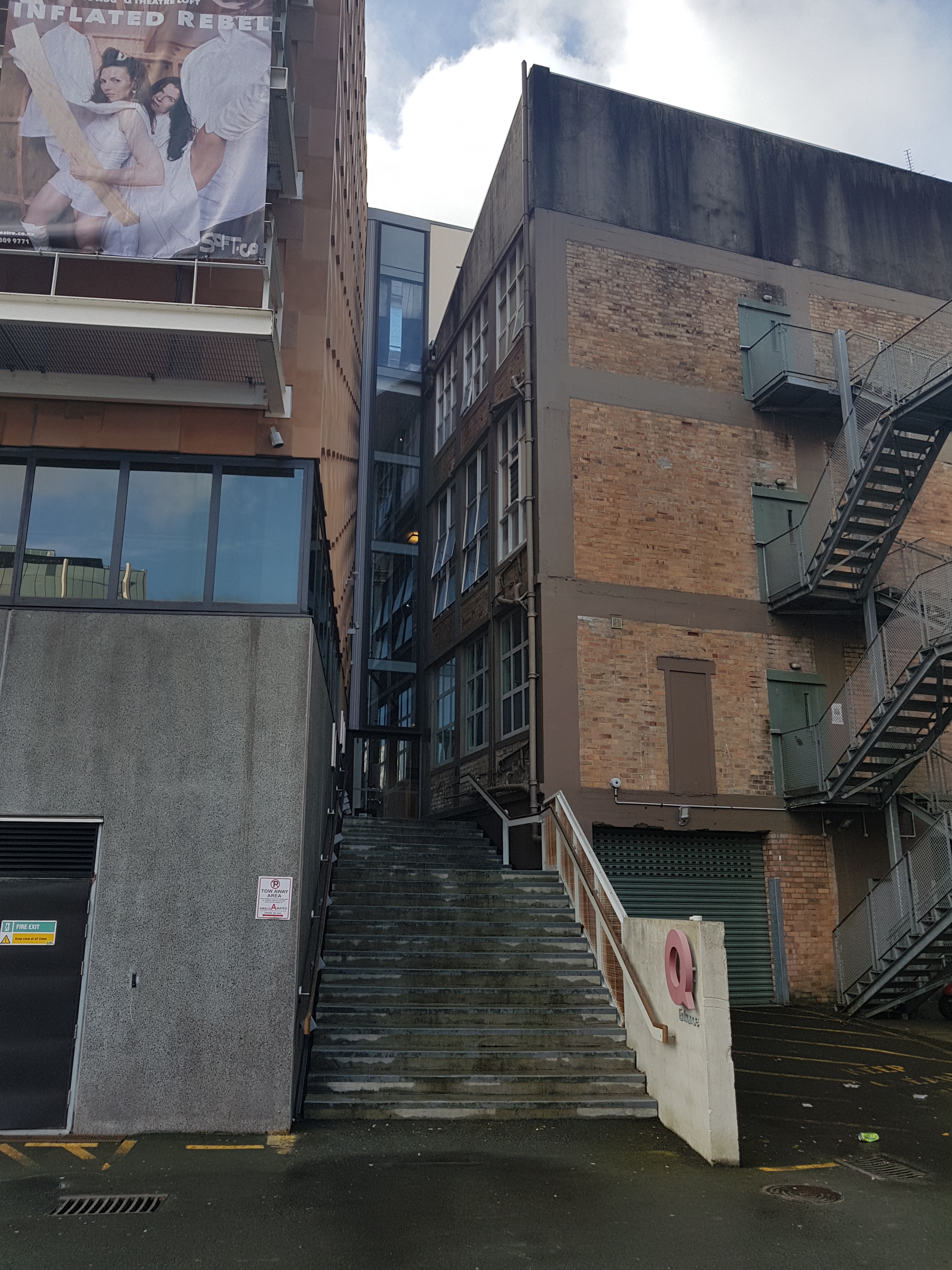
The back of Q Theatre

== History ==
The background to the theatre comes from a group who formed an initiative in 2000 called New Theatre. This was after the closure of the Watershed Theatre in 1996. The Q Theatre brand was launched in 2006.

Construction started in 2009 after fundraising for the NZ$21 million budget. Founding partners and funders include the Auckland Council, Foundation North, New Zealand Lottery Grants Board and private donors.

Q Theatre was designed by Cheshire Architects Limited. The design work was undertaken by Pip Cheshire and Melbourne based architectural theatre specialist Virginia Ross. Architect Raukura Turei also worked on the redevelopment in a role with Te Rōpū Reo Whakahaere, a Māori consultant group. Turei observed there was, 'a level of engagement in te ao Māori that enriched the way the building is used...'.

It is a mixture of a purpose built building and a 'strengthened and reworked' 1920's building (the ‘No Deposit Piano Building').

The project required the demolition and replacement of the existing Town Hall green room and the maintenance of storage and access to the Town Hall’s basement kitchens. (Cheshire Architects)

The building Q Theatre was recognised as the Auckland Architecture Awards Winner 2012 for, 'an adroit and harmonious insertion into a constrained and historic site'. The persistence of people involved in the building project was also acknowledged.

Jennifer Ward-Lealand is a patron of Q Theatre.

== Facilities ==
There are two auditoriums, Rangitira which is a 450-seat flexible format space and the Loft, which seats 120 seats. It also includes rehearsal space and an entrance lobby, bar and cafe.

== Programmes ==
Matchbox is one of Q Theatre's regular programmes running since 2011. It is a development scheme to help artists in a professional arena and to develop new audiences. Performances in this programmes have included Burn Her and the musical Daffodils, which was later adapted into a feature film.

New Zealand International Comedy Festival, Tempo Dance Festival and the Auckland Arts Festival regularly programme works at Q Theatre.
