= Auckland Live =

New Zealand live arts performance and event hosting company

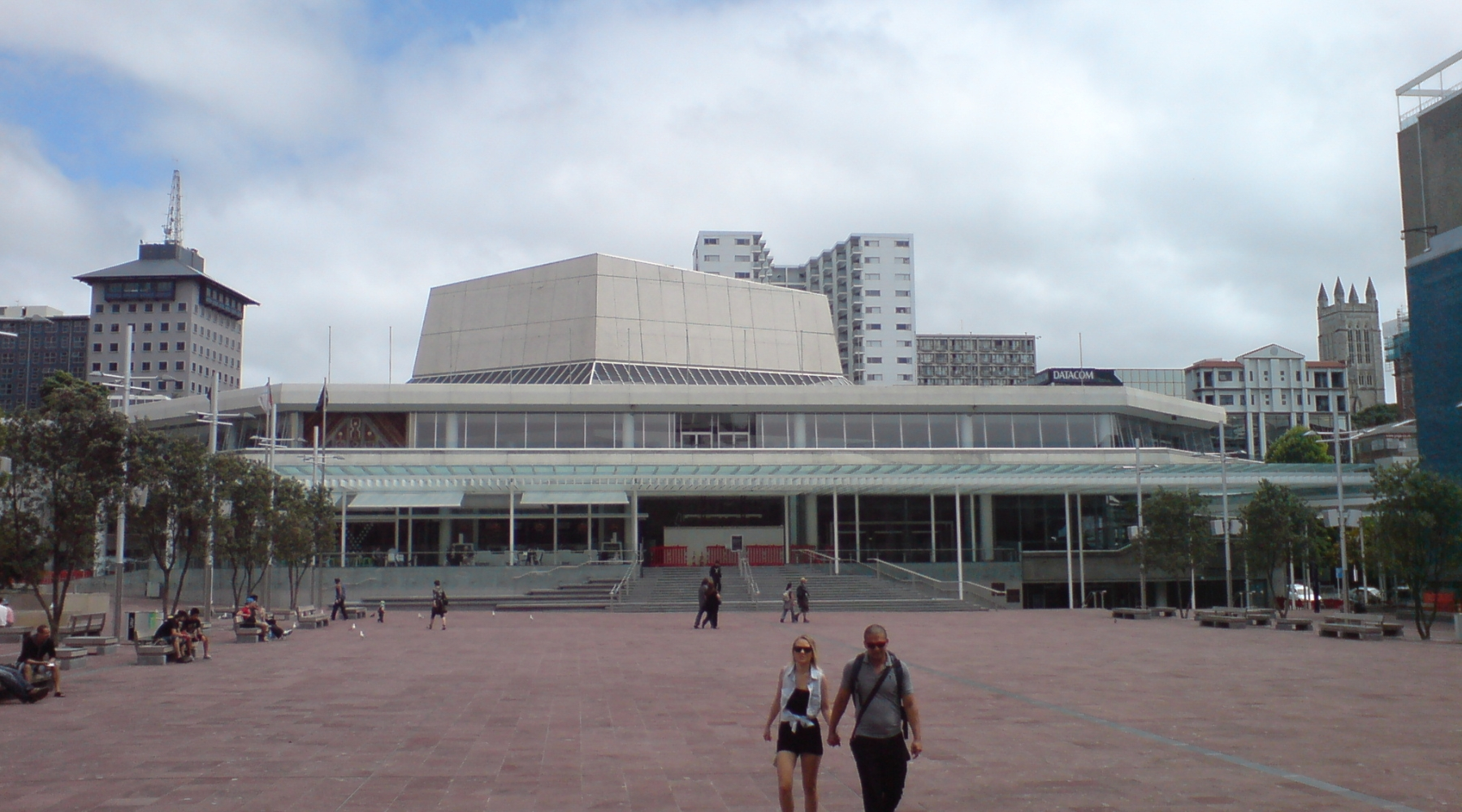
Aotea Centre and Aotea Square, two of the Auckland Live venues

Auckland Live and Auckland Conventions, Venues & Events (ALAC), (formerly known as The Edge) presents live arts performances and events at venues across Auckland, New Zealand. ALAC presents live arts performances and events at several prominent venues across Auckland; it provides support to the arts and creative sector; and provides opportunities for people of all ages to engage with the arts. It is a business unit under the council controlled organisation Auckland Unlimited of Auckland Council and comprises:

- Aotea Centre, a modern events centre.
- Aotea Square, a public square between the venues.
- Auckland Town Hall, a historical building & well-known concert venue.
- Bruce Mason Centre, a performing arts theatre located in the North Shore, Auckland.
- Civic Theatre, a large historical atmospheric theatre.
- Queens Wharf - Located on the Auckland waterfront. Home to Shed 10 & The Cloud.

In 2009, Auckland Live recorded attendances of 736,600 at an unspecified number of events delivered as part of the centre's "Arts Agenda" and "Commercial Entertainment" programmes.

== Governance ==
Established in 2014 (previously known as The Edge), in 2019 Auckland Live was merged with Auckland Conventions, Venues & Events to create a single business unit of then Regional Facilities Auckland (now Auckland Unlimited), an Auckland Council-controlled organisation.
