= Independent Music New Zealand =

Independent Music New Zealand Incorporated (IMNZ) is a trade body which was set up in 2001 to provide a voice for New Zealand independent record labels and distributors.

IMNZ mainly exists to promote independent labels and their artists; and to act as advocates for changes that may need to be made to the industry that will benefit independent labels.

IMNZ started with about 15 member labels, this had grown to nearly 70 by 2007. Member labels and distributors' artists include such diverse acts as Hollie Smith, Scribe (rapper), Fat Freddy’s Drop, SJD (musician), 8 Foot Sativa, Fly My Pretties, Don McGlashan and many more.

The organisation is a member of WIN – the World Wide Independent Music Network. This is made up of 27 member countries, with Board members including the heads of the Tommy Boy, Beggars Group, Cooking Vinyl and K7 labels. WIN is also associated with IMPALA, the international independent music producers' overarching trade body.

== List of chairs ==
- Bernie Griffen (2001 – 2006)
- Mark Kneebone (2006 – present)
