= 2013 New Zealand Music Awards =

Annual New Zealand music awards ceremony

- Awarded for: Excellence in New Zealand music
- Sponsored by: Vodafone
- Date: 21 November 2013
- Location: Vector Arena, Auckland
- Country: New Zealand
- Hosted by: Shannon Ryan and Stan Walker
- Reward: Tui award trophy
- Website: http://nzmusicawards.co.nz

Television/radio coverage
- Network: Four

The 2013 New Zealand Music Awards is the 47th holding of the annual ceremony featuring awards for musical recording artists based in or originating from New Zealand. The main awards event will be held on 21 November 2013 at Vector Arena, Auckland and will again be hosted by Shannon Ryan, along with new host Stan Walker. Nominations opened on 27 May 2013 and closed on 8 July 2013. Eligible works were those released between 1 July 2012 and 30 June 2013. The ceremony will be broadcast on television channel Four, as will a red carpet special hosted by Drew Neemia and Sharyn Casey.

The technical award winners, legacy award recipient and the Critics' Choice Prize shortlist were announced on 22 October at the Pullman hotel, Auckland. The Critics' Choice Prize winner was announced at the Critic's Choice Showcase at the King's Arms bar on 6 November.

== Early awards ==
While most of the awards are presented at the main awards ceremony held in November, four genre awards are presented earlier at ceremonies of their field. The first was awarded in January, with the Tui for Best Folk Album presented at the Auckland Folk Festival in Kumeu to Auckland alt-country group Great North for their album Halves. The Tui for Best Jazz Album was presented in March to Nathan Haines at the National Jazz Festival in Tauranga for his album The Poet's Embrace. The Tui for Best Pacific Music Album was presented to Aaradhna at the Pacific Music Awards in May for her album Treble & Reverb. The Best Country Music Song Tui was presented to Delaney Davidson and Marlon Williams for their album Sad but True – The Secret History of Country Music Songwriting Vol. 1 at the Gold Guitar Awards, also in May.

In addition, the three technical awards are presented at the ceremony on 22 October 2013. Nominees for the technical categories were announced on 10 October.

== Nominees and winners ==
Winners are listed first and highlighted in boldface.

Key
† – Non-technical award
‡ – Technical award

Album of the Year†	Single of the Year†
Sponsored by Mentos: **Aaradhna – Treble & Reverb**; Fat Freddy's Drop – Blackbird; Shapeshifter – Delta; The Phoenix Foundation – Fandango; Unknown Mortal Orchestra – II	Sponsored by Vodafone: **Lorde – "Royals"**; Aaradhna – "Wake Up"; Shapeshifter – "In Colour"; Stan Walker – "Take It Easy"; Unknown Mortal Orchestra – "So Good at Being in Trouble"
Best Group†	Breakthrough Artist of the Year†
Sponsored by Steinlager Pure: **Shapeshifter – Delta**; Fat Freddy's Drop – Blackbird; The Phoenix Foundation – Fandango	Sponsored by Westpac Hotpoints: **Lorde – The Love Club EP**; Jamie McDell – Six Strings and a Sailboat; Willy Moon – Here's Willy Moon
Best Male Solo Artist†	Best Female Solo Artist†
Sponsored by Spotify: **Lawrence Arabia – The Sparrow**; Unknown Mortal Orchestra – II; Willy Moon – Here's Willy Moon	Sponsored by Spotify: **Aaradhna – Treble & Reverb**; Iva Lamkum – Black Eagle; Jamie McDell – Six Strings and a Sailboat
Best Rock Album†	Best Pop Album†
**Villainy – Mode. Set. Clear.**; Beastwars – Blood Becomes Fire; The Datsuns – Death Rattle Boogie	Sponsored by The Edge: **Jamie McDell – Six Strings and a Sailboat**; Anika Boh&Hollie – Peace of Mind; Kids of 88 – Modern Love
Best Urban/Hip Hop Album†	Best Roots Album†
**Aaradhna – Treble & Reverb**; At Peace – Girl Songs; P-Money – Gratitude	**Fat Freddy's Drop – Blackbird**; Latinaotearoa – Sondido de Latinaotearoa; Soljah – Aotearoa
Best Alternative Album†	Best Māori Album†
**Unknown Mortal Orchestra – II**; Lawrence Arabia – The Sparrow; The Phoenix Foundation – Fandango	Sponsored by Numa Trust: **Maisey Rika – Whitiora**; Kirsten Te Rito – Te Rito; Ngatapa Black – I Muri Ahiahi
Best Music Video†	Best Electronica Album†
Sponsored by NZ On Air: **Joel Kefali – "Royals" (Lorde)**; Nick Dwyer – "In Colour" (Shapeshifter); Thunderlips – "Frankenstein" (Randa)	**Shapeshifter – Delta**; K+LAB – Space Dirt; Sola Rosa – Low and Behold, High and Beyond
Best Gospel / Christian Album†	Best Classical Album†
**Strahan – Posters**; Edge Kingsland – Edge Vol.2: Due North; Go Stop Go – Go Stop Go	**Michael Houstoun – Lilburn**; Gillian Whitehead – Arapatiki; Helen Webby – Pluck
People's Choice Award†	Critics' Choice Prize†
Sponsored by Vodafone: **Lorde**; Shapeshifter; Aaradhna; Stan Walker; Titanium	Sponsored by Hallensteins Brothers Presented 6 November 2013: **Sheep, Dog & Wolf**; Janine and the Mixtape; Paquin
Highest selling New Zealand Single†	Highest selling New Zealand Album†
Sponsored by Vodafone No finalists are announced in this category.: **Flight of the Conchords – "Feel Inside (And Stuff Like That)"**	Sponsored by FOUR No finalists are announced in this category.: **Peter Posa – White Rabbit: The Very Best of Peter Posa**
Radio Airplay Record of the Year†	International Achievement Award†
Sponsored by NZ On Air No finalists are announced in this category.: **Stan Walker – "Take It Easy"**	Sponsored by Xbox No finalists are announced in this category.: **Lorde**
Legacy Award†	Best Album Cover‡
Sponsored by The New Zealand Herald; No finalists are announced in this category. Announced 22 October 2013: **Shona Laing**	Presented 22 October 2013: **Gina Kiel and Harry A'Court for Fat Freddy's Drop – Blackbird**; Heather Liddell for Strahan – Posters; Nick Keller for Beastwars – Blood Becomes Fire
Best Engineer‡	Best Producer‡
Presented 22 October 2013: **Brett Stanton / Lee Prebble / The Phoenix Foundation for The Phoenix Foundation – Fandango**; Lee Prebble for Iva Lamkum – Black Eagle; Neil Baldock for Eden Mulholland – Feed the Beast	Presented 22 October 2013: **The Phoenix Foundation / Lee Prebble / Brett Stanton for The Phoenix Foundation – Fandango**; Fat Freddy's Drop for Fat Freddy's Drop – Blackbird; Sam McCarthy, Jaden Parkes, Jordan Arts for Kids of 88 – Modern Love; Shapeshifter and The Upbeats for Shapeshifter – Delta
Best Folk Album†	Best Jazz Album†
Presented 27 January 2013: **Great North – Halves**; Brenda Liddiard – Box of Memories; French For Rabbits – Claimed By the Sea	Presented 31 March 2013: **Nathan Haines – The Poet's Embrace**; Jennifer Zea – The Latin Soul; Whirimako Black – The Late Night Plays
Best Country Music Song†	Best Pacific Music Album†
Presented 30 May 2013: **Delaney Davidson and Marlon Williams – Sad but True –** **The Secret History of Country Music Songwriting Vol. 1**; Donna Dean – Tyre Tracks and Broken Hearts; The Eastern – Hope and Wire	Presented 30 May 2013: **Aaradhna – Treble & Reverb**; Home Brew – Home Brew; Tomorrow People – One

== Presenters and performers ==
=== Presenters ===
Presenters of awards:

- Hosts Stan Walker and Shannon Ryan presented the first three awards: Highest Selling Album, Highest Selling Single and Radio Airplay Award.
- Comedians Urzila Carlson and Jesse Griffin awarded Best Electronica Album, Best Roots Album and Best Urban/Hip Hop Album.
- Māori musician Ria Hall handed out Best Gospel/Christian Album, Best Classical Album and Best Māori Album.
- Damian Vaughan, the CEO of Recorded Music NZ, presented the International Achievement Award.
- Rugby player Benji Marshall and his wife, television personality Zoe, awarded Best Rock Album and Best Alternative Album.
- Lead singer of The Exponents and New Zealand Music Hall of Fame inductee Jordan Luck bestowed the Legacy Award.
- Newsreader Samantha Hayes and broadcaster Paul Henry presented the awards for Best Male and Female Solo Artists.
- Media personalities Jono Pryor and Ben Boyce awarded Best Music Video.
- Teenage online comedian Jamie Curry and Australian pop singer Cody Simpson presented Best Pop Album.
- English performer Natalia Kills awarded Best Group and Breakthrough Artist of the Year.
- Madeleine Sami and Thomas Sainsbury presented People's Choice Award.
- Musician Dave Dobbyn awarded Album and Single of the Year.

=== Performers ===
Performers at the ceremony:

- Lorde opened the ceremony with "Royals".
- Soul vocalist Iva Lamkum sang "Raise Your Glass".
- Jamie McDell performed "Angel".
- Ruby Frost sang "Soviet Snow/(Glad I'm) Not a Kennedy" in tribute to Shona Laing.
- Boyband Titanium sang "Come on Home/Unarmed".
- Aaradhna gave her single "Wake Up".
- Stan Walker closed the show with "Bulletproof/Take It Easy".
