= Lee Prebble =

New Zealand record producer

- Born: Hawke's Bay, New Zealand
- Other name: Dr. Lee
- Occupations: Recording engineer, producer
- Years active: 2001–present
- Known for: Founder of The Surgery Studios
- Website: www.surgerystudios.co.nz

Lee Prebble (also credited as Dr. Lee) is a New Zealand recording engineer and producer, and the founder of The Surgery Studios in Wellington. He has received 19 Aotearoa Music Awards (AMAs) nominations, winning six for engineering and production. Prebble is known for long-term collaborations with The Black Seeds, The Phoenix Foundation, Fly My Pretties and L.A.B. He has also worked with artists such as Mel Parsons and Dave Dobbyn.

== Background and early career ==
Prebble was born in Hawke's Bay and studied radio broadcasting in Christchurch. After a six-month internship at Marmalade Audio in Wellington, he was employed as a full-time engineer, largely recording advertisements. There he met Barnaby Weir, frontman of The Black Seeds, who was recording commercials for Radio Active. The connection led to Prebble engineering the band's debut album, Keep On Pushing (2001), which achieved platinum certification.

Prebble began collecting studio gear and analogue equipment, much of it acquired from Radio Active when the station transitioned to digital. He mixed live performances for The Black Seeds, Trinity Roots and other Wellington bands, using reverbs, delays and other effects.

In 2001, while still at Marmalade, he worked after-hours with Trinity Roots on their debut album True (2001), recording in the band's basic basement studio in Newtown. During these sessions, the band nicknamed him “The Doctor” for his ability to solve technical problems and improve sound, a moniker that evolved into "Dr. Lee." As the sessions progressed, the space accumulated more of Prebble's gear, and by the end of the project they recognised they had established a functioning recording studio, which they named The Surgery. True achieved platinum certification and Prebble toured Europe with Trinity Roots as their live mixer.

== Career ==
=== 2000s–2010 ===
During the early 2000s, Prebble engineered and produced albums for artists associated with the “Wellington Sound,” most notably The Black Seeds and Trinity Roots. In 2004, Radio New Zealand (RNZ) described his work as “landmark local recordings.” Prebble rejected the idea of a fixed “Wellington Sound,” saying it was simply “what happens” when musicians make music they enjoy within the same environment. He attributed his success to being fortunate to work with talented and open-minded bands who shared his preference for “not too clean” sounds and “interesting tones” shaped by dub and reggae influences.

Prebble subsequently left Marmalade to formally establish The Surgery Studios, expanding the basement space into a dedicated recording and rehearsal hub for Wellington musicians. His work spans genres such as roots, jazz, folk, rock, and Te Reo Māori music.

Prebble was nominated for Best Engineer at the 2004 AMAs for The Phoenix Foundation's debut album Horsepower (2003). He continued to receive nominations throughout the following years, winning Best Engineer and Best Producer in 2008 for The Phoenix Foundation's Happy Ending (2007).

In 2010, he won Best Engineer for the band's album Buffalo (2010), which received eight nominations and won four awards. He was also nominated for Best Engineer, and for Best Producer with Barnaby Weir for Fly My Pretties: A Story (2009). In its coverage of the ceremony, The New Zealand Herald described Prebble as a “dark aural lord of sonic magic.”

=== 2010–present ===
In 2012, the original Surgery building was demolished. Prebble designed and physically built the new facility inside a former warehouse in Newtown. Barnaby Weir described the studio as ‘having the feeling somebody’s loved it and built it from the ground up,’ noting that ‘there’s a lot of [Prebble’s] personality in The Surgery."

He has consistently received recognition at the AMAs, winning Best Engineer and Best Producer for The Phoenix Foundation's Fandango (2013) with Brett Stanton. In 2014, RNZ highlighted his contribution to "some of the capital's most iconic albums" of the 21st century. In 2015, he won Best Engineer for Mel Parsons's Drylands (2015) with Oliver Harmer.

Prebble is known for long-term collaborations and has worked on every major album by The Black Seeds, Trinity Roots, The Phoenix Foundation and Fly My Pretties since their debuts. Since 2017, he has worked on all six of L.A.B.'s studio albums, which have achieved multi-platinum certification, alongside 20 multi-platinum and 12 gold singles.

== Musicianship ==
=== Performances and collaborations ===
Beyond his studio work, Prebble is also a musician. He played lap steel guitar with The Woolshed Sessions, a collective featuring Age Pryor, Dream Chambers (then known as Jess Chambers), and other Wellington artists. Their self-titled 2009 album, which Prebble mixed, was nominated for Best Roots Album at the AMAs and included the APRA Award-winning single "Stringing Me Along". He has also performed live with Fly My Pretties, a collaborative performance collective featuring a rotating lineup of prominent New Zealand musicians.

=== Remix work ===
In 2024, Prebble contributed remixes to Dub & Fire (2024), a dub version of The Black Seeds' 2022 album Love & Fire, alongside Jamaican producer Scientist (Hopeton Brown).

== Education and outreach ==
Prebble has worked to increase accessibility to the recording industry through workshops for women and young adults, held both around the country and at his studio, working with organizations including Recorded Music New Zealand, YAMI, and RecordEnable.

== Aotearoa Music Awards ==
The Aotearoa Music Awards recognise outstanding achievements in New Zealand music.

Year	Recipient / Work	Award	Result	Ref.
2004	The Phoenix Foundation – Horsepower	Best Engineer	Nominated	
2005	The Phoenix Foundation – Pegasus	Best Producer	Nominated	
2006	Fly My Pretties – The Return of Fly My Pretties	Best Engineer	Nominated	
2008	The Phoenix Foundation – Happy Ending	Best Engineer	Won	
2008	The Phoenix Foundation – Happy Ending	Best Producer	Won	
2009	The Woolshed Sessions – Lee Prebble on lap steel	Best Roots Band	Nominated	
2009	Spartacus R – When The Fever Takes Hold	Best Engineer	Nominated	
2010	The Phoenix Foundation – Buffalo	Best Engineer	Won	
2010	Fly My Pretties – A Story	Best Engineer	Nominated	
2010	Lee Prebble & Barnaby Weir – Fly My Pretties - A Story	Best Producer	Nominated	
2013	Lee Prebble & Brett Stanton – The Phoenix Foundation – Fandango	Best Engineer	Won	
2013	Lee Prebble & Brett Stanton – The Phoenix Foundation – Fandango	Best Producer	Won	
2013	Iva Lamkum – Black Eage	Best Engineer	Nominated	
2015	Lee Prebble & Oliver Harmer – Mel Parsons – Drylands	Best Engineer	Won	
2016	Lee Prebble & Samuel Flynn Scott – Dave Dobbyn – Harmony House	Best Engineer	Nominated	
2020	Lee Prebble & Ara Adams Tamatea – L.A.B – L.A.B III	Best Engineer	Nominated	
2020	Ria Hall – Manawa Wera	Best Engineer	Nominated	
2021	Lee Prebble & Ara Adams Tamatea – L.A.B – L.A.B. IV	Best Engineer	Nominated	
2022	L.A.B – L.A.B V	Best Engineer	Nominated	
