= Our Place (album) =

Studio album by Adi Dick
- Released: 1 May 2007
- Recorded: Wellington, New Zealand 2006-2007
- Genre: Dub/Roots/Reggae/Jazz/Soul
- Length: 45:25
- Label: Loop
- Producer: Adi Dick

Adi Dick chronology
Noise In Your Stereo (2005)	Our Place (2007)

Our Place is the debut album from acclaimed Fly My Pretties band member, Adi Dick. It was recorded in his bedroom and released by Loop Recordings Aotearoa in 2007.

== Track listing ==
No.	Title	Length
1.	"Get Out"	6:23
2.	"I Will Not Go"	3:54
3.	"Beautiful View"	4:38
4.	"Our Place"	4:05
5.	"Sunshine"	4:20
6.	"Soldier Girl"	3:44
7.	"No No No"	1:27
8.	"Second Hand Store"	4:56
9.	"Down Home"	4:53
10.	"Drifting"	6:55

== Band members ==
- Adi Dick - Vocals, Instruments
- Rio Hempo - Bass (on 'Sunshine' and 'Beautiful View')
- Fulla Flash - Saxophone (on 'Get Out')
