= All That I Wanted =

All That I Wanted may refer to:

- "All That I Wanted" (Belfegore song), 1984 song
- All That I Wanted – Acoustic EP, Jamie McDell album
