= Buffalo (The Phoenix Foundation album) =

Studio album by The Phoenix Foundation
- Released: 26 April 2010
- Genres: Indie rock, Neo-psychedelia, Indie pop
- Length: 42:59
- Label: EMI New Zealand
- Producer: The Phoenix Foundation

The Phoenix Foundation chronology
| Happy Ending (2007) | Buffalo (2010) | Fandango (2013) |

Buffalo is the fourth full-length album by New Zealand band, The Phoenix Foundation. It was released in New Zealand in April 2010, and internationally in January 2011.

== Background ==
The band's previous album, Happy Ending, had been well received in New Zealand and had stirred some interest overseas. Just before Christmas 2009, the band self-released the Merry Kriskmass EP through Bandcamp, saying "this fun, slightly odd 6-track EP entered our lives during the time we were supposed to be recording our new album".

== Recording ==
Recording of the album began at The Car Club, and was eventually completed with producer Lee Prebble at The Surgery in Wellington.

Bass player Warner Emery left the band during the recording of Buffalo on amicable terms. He was replaced by Tom Callwood, who had previously provided double bass on the Merry Kriskmass track 'Forget It', and cello on Happy Ending.

== Release ==
The first single from Buffalo was the title track, which was released in March 2010, six weeks before the album. The band offered it as a free digital download for a week upon release. The music video was directed by Nathan Hickey, and the B-side was the non-album track, "Dickheads Abound".

Buffalo was released on 26 April 2010, on CD, vinyl and as a digital download.

== International release ==
At the end of September 2010, the Phoenix Foundation announced a new record deal with UK record label Memphis Industries, who released the first European single "Pot" in November 2010, and the album worldwide on 24 January 2011.

In an interview with The Guardian, Samuel Flynn Scott said, "I honestly feel like Buffalo is the best album for us to be introducing ourselves to the rest of the world, because I feel like it's the album that sounds the most like us."

== Touring ==
The Phoenix Foundation undertook an eight show album release tour in New Zealand in May 2010.

To coincide with the international release, the band toured the UK and Europe in January and February, and returned for a longer tour from May to July 2011.

== Critical reception ==
Professional ratings
Review scores
| Source | Rating |
|---|---|
| Allmusic | 3.5/5 stars |
| BBC | favorable |
| The Guardian | 5/5 stars |
| New Zealand Listener | favorable |
| The New Zealand Herald | 3/5 stars |
| Stuff.co.nz | 4.5/5 stars |

New Zealand critics mostly praised Buffalo. Prominent music writer Nick Bollinger said in the New Zealand Listener that the Phoenix Foundation "play like the best kind of band, all their skills put to the service of the songs", while Stuff.co.nz gave the album 4.5 stars, saying the band were "as good as ever". However some critics felt that the album was not as strong as their previous work, with Russell Baillie of The New Zealand Herald saying "much of the second half seems to go past in a pleasant mid-tempo haze".

The album was generally well received internationally, particularly in the United Kingdom. Guardian reviewer, Dave Simpson, said it seemed "destined to be among the best of 2011", and the BBC's Andrzej Lukowski felt that "every second of Buffalo is wrought and layered with artisan care". As a result of the album's success, the band performed live on the BBC's ‘'Later... with Jools Holland'‘ on 25 October 2011. It was their UK TV debut. The band played two songs from the album, "Buffalo" and "Flock of Hearts".

=== Accolades ===
Buffalo was nominated for 8 New Zealand Music Awards in 2010, including Album of the Year and Single of the Year (for "Buffalo"). The Phoenix Foundation won the New Zealand Music Award for Best Group, and Buffalo won Best Producer, Best Engineer and Best Album Cover. The album was also shortlisted for the 2011 Taite Music Prize.

== Track listing ==
All tracks are written by The Phoenix Foundation.

| No. | Title | Length |
|---|---|---|
| 1. | "Eventually" | 5:28 |
| 2. | "Buffalo" | 4:14 |
| 3. | "Flock of Hearts"" | 3:18 |
| 4. | "Pot" | 3:24 |
| 5. | "Bitte Bitte" | 4:32 |
| 6. | "Skeleton" | 3:53 |
| 7. | "Orange & Mango" | 3:53 |
| 8. | "Bailey's Beach" | 4:06 |
| 9. | "Wonton" | 4:02 |
| 10. | "Golden Ship" | 6:14 |
| Total length: | | 42:59 |

== Personnel ==
- Luke Buda – guitar, vocals, keyboards
- Samuel Flynn Scott – guitar, vocals, keyboards
- Conrad Wedde – guitar
- Tom Callwood – bass
- Warner Emery – bass
- Will Ricketts – percussion, keyboards
- Richie Singleton – drums
- Peter Daly – viola (Track 6)
- James Milne – voice (Tracks 4 & 10)
- Connan Mockasin – autoharp (Track 1)
- Craig Terris – voice (Track 9)

== Charts ==
=== Weekly charts ===
| Chart (2010) | Peak position |
|---|---|
| New Zealand Albums (RMNZ) | 4 |

=== Year-end charts ===
| Chart (2010) | Position |
|---|---|
| New Zealand Albums (RMNZ) | 48 |

== Release history ==
| Region | Date | Label | Format | Catalog |
|---|---|---|---|---|
| New Zealand | 26 April 2010 | EMI New Zealand | CD | 5099963307122 |
| New Zealand | 26 April 2010 | Slow Boat Records | vinyl | SBRLP102 |
| United Kingdom | 24 January 2011 | Memphis Industries | CD | MI0170CD |
| United Kingdom | 24 January 2011 | Memphis Industries | vinyl | MI0170LP |
| United Kingdom | 24 January 2011 | Memphis Industries | digital download | MI0170D |
