= Ask Me Anything =

Ask Me Anything may refer to:

- Ask Me Anything (film), 2014
- Ask Me Anything (album), 2015, by Jamie McDell
- "Ask Me Anything", a song by the Strokes on their album First Impressions of Earth
- Ask Me Anything (AMA), a common post topic in the r/IAmA subreddit of Reddit
- Angela Scanlon's Ask Me Anything, an RTE programme in Ireland
- "Hey, it's me, it's Verity, ask me anything.", a well known lyric from a popular song about the online phenomenon Verity
