= Tessa Rain =

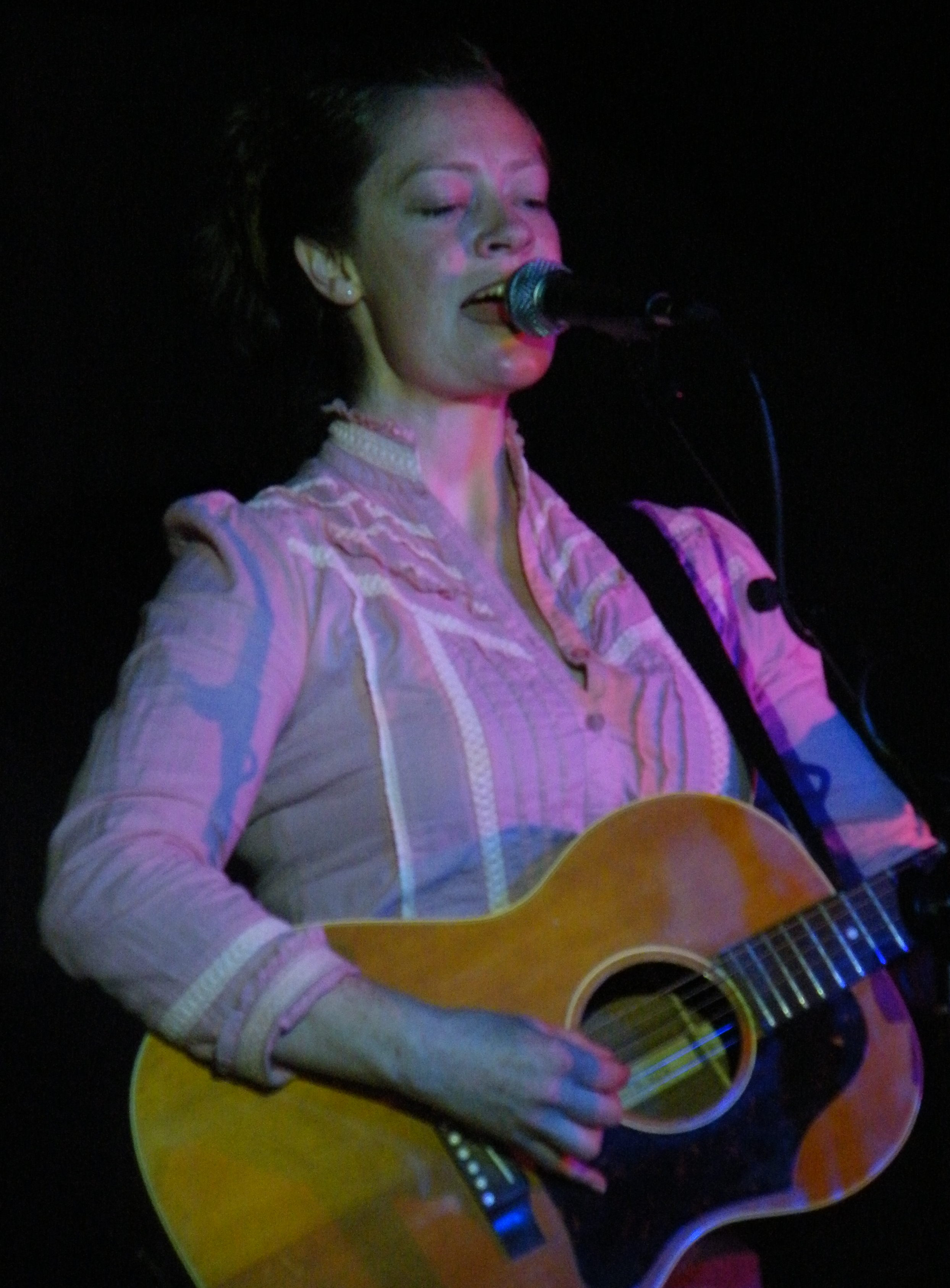
- Tessa Rain performing at The Ruby Lounge, Wellington (2010)

Background information
- Origin: Wellington, New Zealand
- Genres: Indie folk
- Occupation: Singer-songwriter
- Instruments: Vocals; guitar

Tessa Rain is a New Zealand indie folk singer-songwriter best known for her collaboration with Fly My Pretties. She wrote the songs Carrier Pigeon and Smoke Me from The Return of Fly My Pretties, and Mauri from A Story. Her debut solo album "Dirt Poems" was released in August 2010.

== Biography ==
Tessa Rain is also known for her past collaborations with Age Pryor; together they released the album Homerecordings. The song Funny Shadow from this album was written by Rain and was later featured in the Miramax film Eagle vs Shark.

In 2006, Rain was the subject of a 45-minute interview broadcast nationally on Radio New Zealand National, where she performed several songs including Smoke Me. In 2007, Rain returned to Radio New Zealand National for another live broadcast performance with Jess Chambers.

Rain has also made appearances as a harmony singer and has contributed to several popular recordings, including Jess Chambers and the Firefly Orchestra, Age Pryor's Shanks' Pony and City Chorus, and Ryan Prebble's Fruits. Outside of Fly My Pretties tours and in addition to performing as a solo artist, she has performed or toured with Age Pryor, Ryan Prebble, Eva Prowse, and Jesse Rivest.
