= All That I Wanted – Acoustic EP =

EP by Jamie McDell
- Released: 4 May 2012
- Genre: Pop
- Length: 19:03
- Label: EMI Music New Zealand

Jamie McDell chronology
All That I Wanted – Acoustic EP (2012)	Six Strings and a Sailboat (2012)

All That I Wanted – Acoustic EP is the debut EP by New Zealand singer-songwriter Jamie McDell. It features acoustic renditions of "You'll Never Take That Away", "Rewind", and three other original songs. It was released digitally via iTunes through EMI Music New Zealand on 4 May 2012.

== Promotion ==
As McDell is highly interactive with her fans (whom she affectionately refers to as "Gypsy Pirates"), the EP was promoted via Facebook with McDell posting lyrics, guitar tabs, behind-the-scenes video diaries, photos, competitions, and invitations to showcases and premiere parties. Fans were also encouraged to purchase the EP on iTunes to win handcrafted and framed lyrics made by Jamie herself.

== Chart performance ==
The EP debuted and peaked on the Top 20 New Zealand Albums chart (which features albums by New Zealand artists) at No. 8, on 14 May 2012. The album dropped to No. 17 the following week and spent a total of three weeks on the chart.

== Music videos ==
Music videos featuring McDell performing each track in various beach locations were created and uploaded to her YouTube channel.

== Track listing ==
All tracks are written by Jamie McDell

No.	Title	Length
1.	"All That I Wanted"	4:17
2.	"You'll Never Take That Away"	3:33
3.	"That's Love"	4:05
4.	"Rewind"	3:37
5.	"Angel"	3:33

== Personnel ==
- Jamie McDell – vocals, guitar, piano
- Chaz Rabble – engineering and mixing
- Edward Castelow – engineering and mixing
