= Adi Dick =

New Zealand singer

Adi Dick (born 5 January 1978 in Wellington, New Zealand) is a singer, songwriter and producer who has been involved in many projects within the New Zealand music scene.

Dick was involved in a roots and blues trio called the Seven Suns (Formerly known as Stylus77) and released a mini album under the name Stylus 77 in 2003 on Capital Recordings, and in Barnaby Weir's, Black Seeds musical collaboration band Fly My Pretties, featuring on the 2005 album, Return of Fly My Pretties. Here he played two songs; 'Get Out' and 'Foresight.' Dick also accompanied Fly My Pretties on their sold out New Zealand tour in July 2006.

In 2005 Dick attended the Red Bull Music Academy in Seattle, U.S., selected from 2000 applicants. Here he collaborated for two weeks with 59 other musicians, producers, singers, MCs, DJs from around the world. Before his excursion to Seattle, Adi Dick released his first solo EP, Noise in Your Stereo. Recorded in his bedroom and released on his own label 'First Take Records,' it is inspired by jazz, hip hop, blues and soul. He has toured the UK and Europe including with the band Fat Freddy's Drop.

Adi Dick also founded the band Sons of Puha, featuring Adi on MPC, guitar and vocals, Doughboy Johnson on bass and Lisa Preston on vocals. On 1 May 2007, Adi Dick released his debut album Our Place, featuring a new version of Get Out which he wrote and performed in Fly My Pretties. He released an EP Spacedust in 2012.
