= Flip Grater =

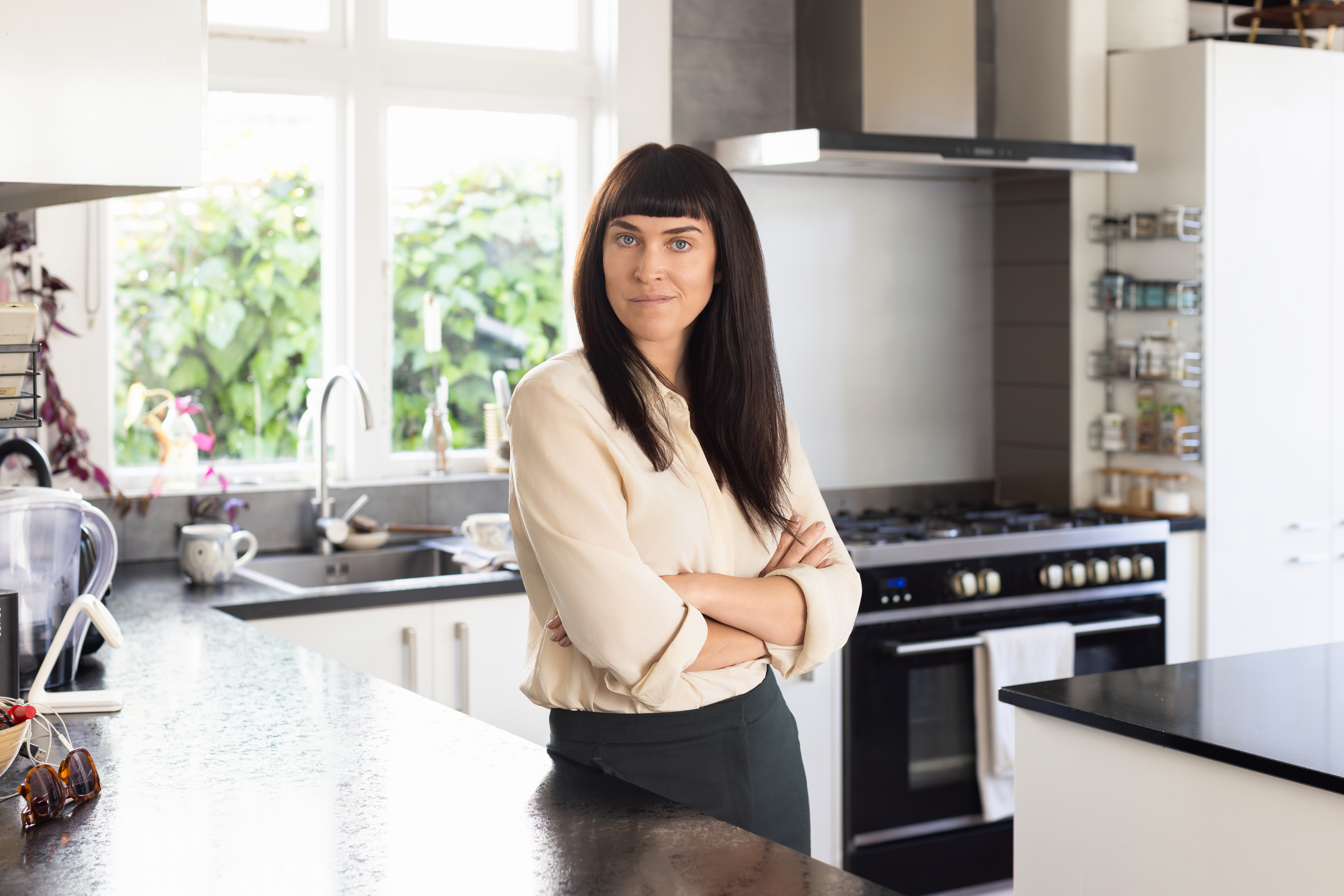

Background information
- Born: Clare Grater; 22 September 1981 (age 44); Christchurch, New Zealand
- Genres: Indie, folk, acoustic,
- Occupations: Musician, composer, author, chef
- Instruments: guitar, vocals
- Years active: 2004–present
- Labels: Maiden, Make My Day, Vicious Circle
- Website: www.gratergoods.co.nz

Flip Grater is a New Zealand singer-songwriter, author, and entrepreneur. In addition to her indie-folk music career, she has run businesses that produce entirely plant-based food products under the Grater Good brand.

== Biography ==
Flip Grater was born in Christchurch, New Zealand. She became vegan at 15. Music was a part of her upbringing, introduced by her father. Grater was born with the name Clare, but picked up the name Flip (short for Flipper) in her teens while campaigning for the Hector's dolphin.

=== Music career ===
Flip Grater began her music career in the early 2000s, while working at RDU-FM. Her first EP was titled Nameless. Her debut album was called Cage For A Song (2006), blending folk, rock, and indie influences. She later toured New Zealand as a member of Fly My Pretties.

Her 2014 album, Pigalle, was inspired by her time in Paris, where she lived for several years between 2012 and 2015. In 2018 she released an EP of lullabies written for her daughter.

In 2006 she founded her own record label, Maiden Records.

=== Writing and business ===
In addition to her music career, Grater is an author. Her cookbook The Grater Good highlights some of the dishes available at her French-styled Christchurch Bistro and was released by Koa Press in 2021. From 2018 she operated a food manufacturing business in Christchurch, also branded Grater Good.

In 2025 she opened a vegan bistro in Christchurch, also called Grater Good. Seven months later she announced that the bistro would close, and a few days later placed her food manufacturing business into voluntary liquidation after a business deal with Woolworths fell through.

=== Personal life ===
Flip Grater has a daughter and lives in Christchurch. Grater is a practising Buddhist.

== Discography ==
- Nameless EP (2004)
- Cage For A Song (2006)
- Be All And End All (2008)
- While I’m Awake I’m At War (2010)
- Pigalle (2014)
- Lullabies for Anaïs EP (2018)

== Bibliography ==
- The Cookbook Tour: An NZ tour story. Christchurch: Maiden Records. 2007. ISBN 9780473123482. OCLC 174098007.
- The Cookbook Tour Europe: Adventures in food and music. Auckland: David Bateman Ltd. 2012. ISBN 978-1775480914. OCLC 761016300.
- The Grater Good. Christchurch: Koa Press. 2021. ISBN 9780473587697. OCLC 1290436987.
