= Jamie McDell =

New Zealand singer-songwriter (born 1992)

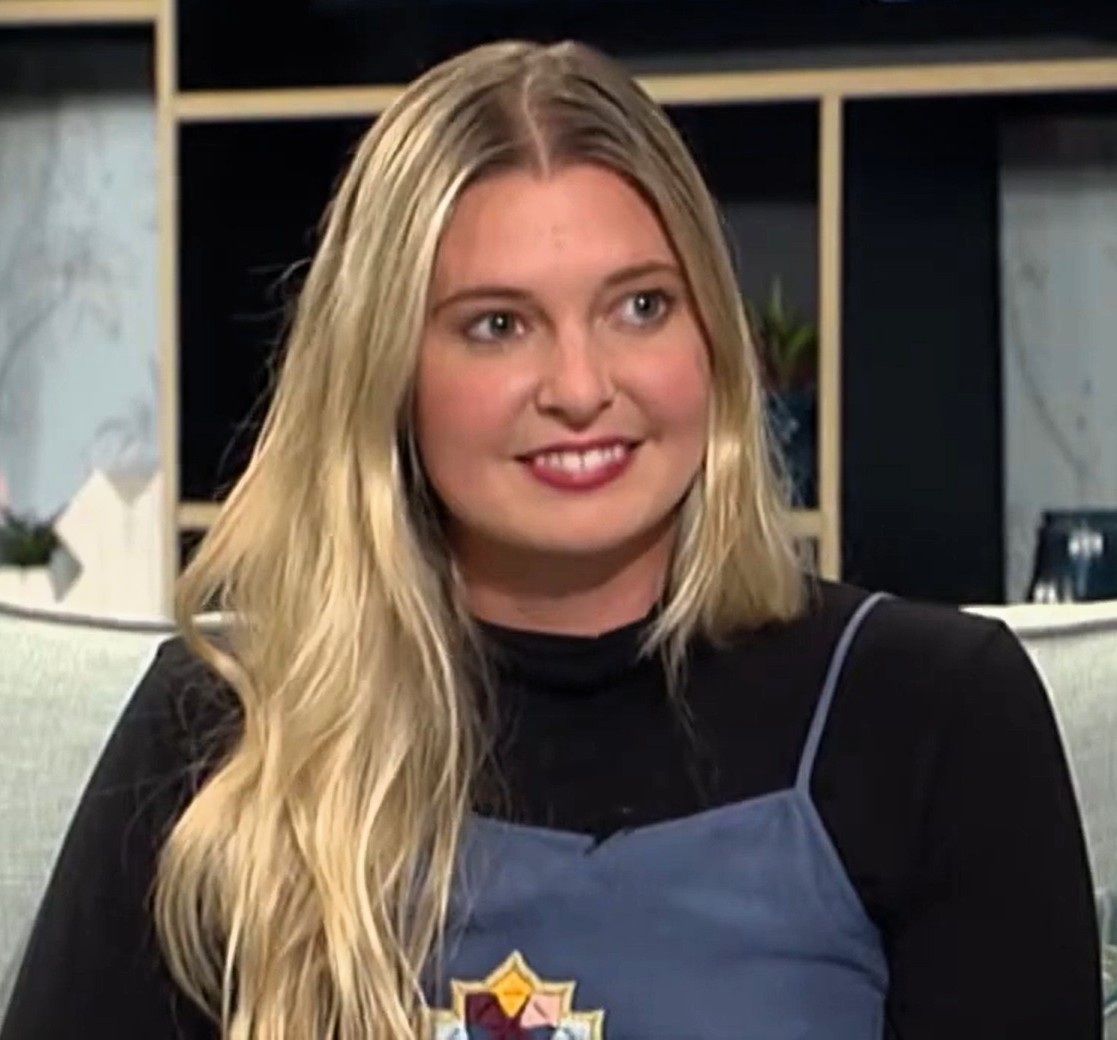
- McDell in 2018

Background information
- Born: 3 November 1992 (age 34); Auckland, New Zealand
- Genres: alt-country, country-pop, folk
- Occupations: Singer, songwriter
- Instruments: Vocals, guitar
- Years active: 2012–present
- Label: Independent
- Website: www.jamiemcdell.co.nz

Jamie McDell (born 3 November 1992) is a New Zealand musician and singer-songwriter. She was discovered at the age of 16 by EMI Music New Zealand after sending them a demo tape of her acoustic original music. Prior to being signed by a major record label, McDell used various social media outlets to gain exposure, posting YouTube videos – including original songs and cover songs, Twitter and Facebook to get her music out to the masses.

She released her debut single, "You'll Never Take That Away", on 20 February 2012, which was certified Gold in New Zealand. Following the success of her debut single, McDell released her EP, All That I Wanted – Acoustic EP, on 4 May 2012. Her second single, "Rewind" was released on 13 June 2012. McDell's debut studio album, Six Strings and a Sailboat, was released 16 November 2012 and was certified Gold in New Zealand.

Ask Me Anything, McDell's second studio album, was released 27 March 2015.

McDell's third studio album, Extraordinary Girl, was released on 4 May 2018, independently released and recorded at House of Blues, Studio D, Nashville Tennessee. The album featured various country musicians such as Kasey Chambers, Bill Chambers and Tami Neilson.

== Early life and career ==
Jamie McDell was born in Auckland and brought up in a musical family, with a passion for singing and music. Her father Terry McDell, a New Zealand sailing champion (1972 Yachtsman of the Year) decided the family would live aboard a yacht in the Mediterranean when Jamie was seven years of age. She was introduced to the music of Jimmy Buffett and John Denver and learnt to play the guitar by watching her parents perform these songs on the boat.

Jamie McDell on songwriting:

I write songs about a lot of different things depending on what's happening in my life at the time. Lately my songs have been about relationships, dealing with loss, and wanting to go back to the beach! I can really get inspired by anything.

=== 2012–present: Six Strings and a Sailboat ===
McDell's single, "You'll Never Take That Away", was released to the New Zealand market on 20 February 2012. It was successful on the Official New Zealand Top 40, entering and debuting on the chart at No. 27 on 2 April 2012. The single climbed to No. 11 and spent a total of ten weeks on the chart. The single topped the Top 20 New Zealand Singles chart (which features singles by New Zealand artists) on 30 April 2012, holding the top position for four consecutive weeks. The single was certified Gold on 28 May 2012.

Following the success of her debut single, McDell released a 5-track EP, All That I Wanted – Acoustic EP, featuring acoustic renditions of "You'll Never Take That Away", "Rewind" and three other original songs. It was released via EMI Music New Zealand on 4 May 2012.

Her second single, "Rewind", was released 13 July 2012. It peaked at number 30 on the New Zealand singles chart. Her third single, "Life in Sunshine", was released 12 October 2012. It peaked at number 27 on the New Zealand singles chart.

McDell entered the studio to begin recording her debut studio album in August 2012. The cover art, release date and title for the album, Six Strings and a Sailboat, were revealed on her official Facebook page. The album was released 16 November 2012. It peaked at No. 8 on the New Zealand albums chart. An instrumental version of the album was released on 11 January 2013 on the iTunes Store.

Her fourth single, "Angel", was released 1 February 2013.

She wrote a song called "Ode to the Lines" for Global Citizen. It was released on 26 July 2013 on the iTunes Store with all proceeds going towards helping those living in extreme poverty. She performed "Ode to the Lines" with Anika Moa at the Global Citizen Concert, held at the Auckland Town Hall on 4 August 2013.

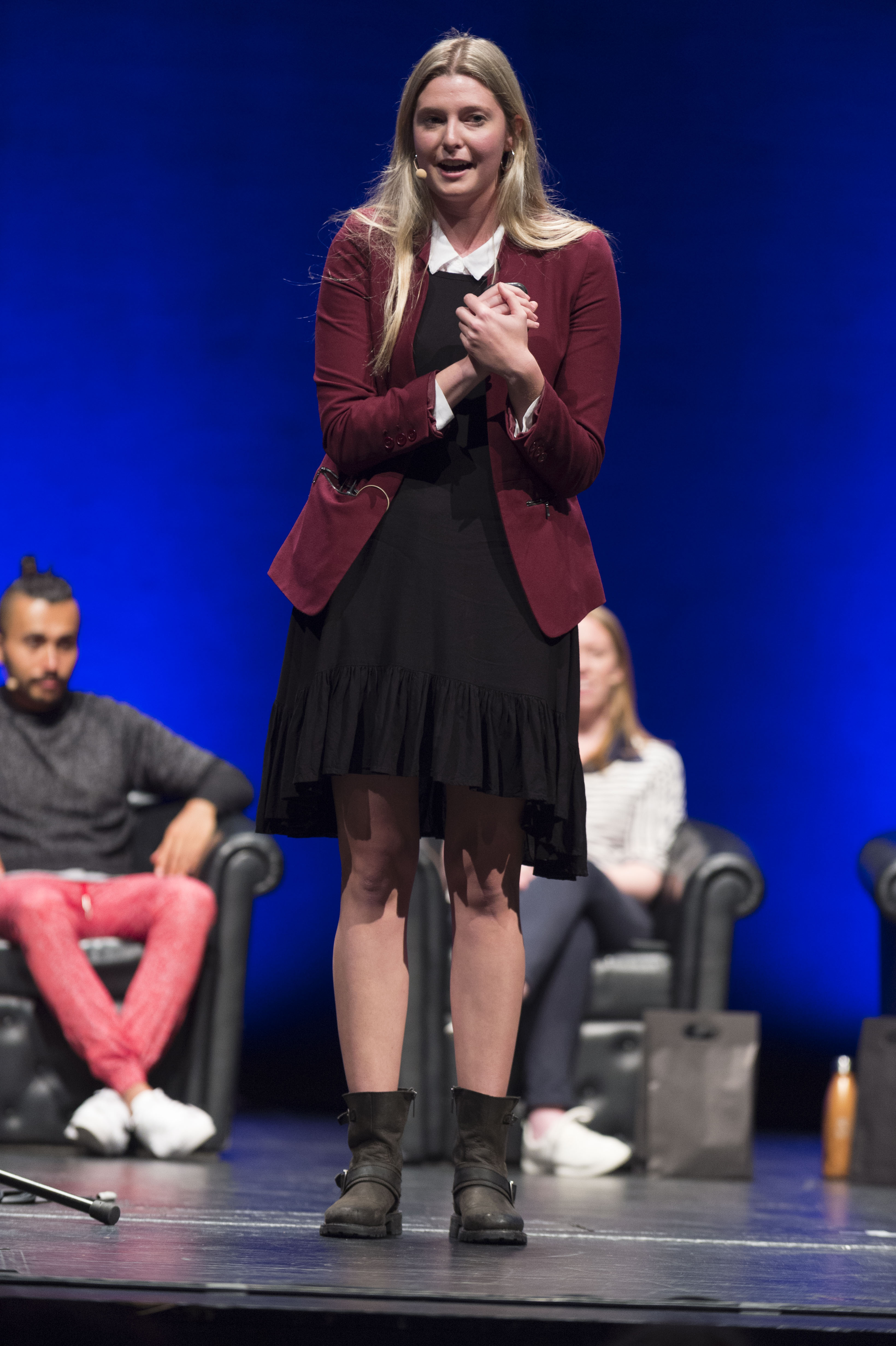
McDell in 2016

Though Jamie began her music career in the commercial Pop music world, she became an independent artist in 2016 and decided to pursue her dream of recording in Nashville. In late 2017 Jamie travelled to Nashville to record an album, solely written by her, with award-winning Australian producer Nash Chambers.

She was named 2018 Top Female Artist by the Variety Artists Club of New Zealand at the 2018 Benny Awards.

== Discography ==
Jamie McDell discography
- Studio albums: 2
- Extended plays: 2
- Singles: 6
- Music videos: 6

=== Studio albums ===
Album	Album details	Charts		Certifications (sales thresholds)
Album	Album details	NZ	NZ Artist	Certifications (sales thresholds)
Six Strings and a Sailboat	Released: 16 November 2012; Label: EMI Music; Formats: CD, Digital download	8	2	RMNZ: Gold
Ask Me Anything	Released: 27 March 2015; Label: Universal Music; Formats: CD, digital download	7	3	
Extraordinary Girl	Released: 4 May 2018; Label: Self-released; Formats: CD, digital download	— (Note: Extraordinary Girl did not enter the NZ Top 40 Albums Chart, but peaked at number one on the NZ Heatseeker Albums Chart.)	—	
Jamie McDell	Released: 25 February 2022; Label: Self-released, ABC; Formats: CD, digital download, streaming	TBR	TBR	

=== Extended plays ===
Album	Album details	Charts	Certifications (sales thresholds)
Album	Album details	NZ Artist	Certifications (sales thresholds)
All That I Wanted – Acoustic EP	Release: 4 May 2012; Label: EMI Music; Formats: Digital download	8	
Crash – EP	Release: 21 November 2014; Label: Universal Music NZ; Formats: Digital download	—	
Tori – EP	Release: 23 February 2018; Label: self-released; Formats: Digital download	—	
The Botox – EP	Release: 25 October 2019; Label: self-released; Formats: Digital download	—	
Jamie McDell OurVinyl Sessions	Release: 13 February 2020; Label: Our Vinyl; Formats: Digital download	—	
Beach House	Scheduled: 16 June 2023; Label: Jamie McDell, ABC; Formats: Digital download	—	

=== Singles ===
Year	Single	Peak Positions		Album	Certifications (sales thresholds)
Year	Single	NZ	NZ Artist	Album	Certifications (sales thresholds)
2012	"You'll Never Take That Away"	11	1	Six Strings and a Sailboat	RMNZ: Gold
2012	"Rewind"	30	1	Six Strings and a Sailboat	
2012	"Life in Sunshine"	27	3	Six Strings and a Sailboat	RMNZ: Gold
2013	"Angel"	—	3	Six Strings and a Sailboat	
2014	"Dumb"	37	3	Ask Me Anything	
2014	"Crash"	—	5	Ask Me Anything	
2019	"God is a Woman (615 Sessions)"	—	—	n/a	
2019	"Extraordinary Girl (615 Sessions)"	—	—	n/a	
2021	"Dream Team"	—	—	Jamie McDell	
2021	"Not Ready Yet"	—	—	Jamie McDell	
2022	"Poor Boy" (with Tom Busby)	—	—	Jamie McDell	
2022	"Mother's Daughter"	—	—	Jamie McDell	
2023	"BeachHouse"	—	—	BeachHouse	

==== Charity singles ====
Year	Single
2013	"Ode to the Lines"

=== Music videos ===
Title	Year	Director(s)	Ref
"You"ll Never Take That Away"	2012	—N/a	
"Rewind"	2012	—N/a	
"Life in Sunshine"	2012	—N/a	
"Angel"	2013	Garth Badger	
"Dumb"	2014	Shae Sterling	
"Crash"	2014	Anita Ward	
"Back of My Mind"	2015	Garth Badger	

== Awards and nominations ==
Awards	Year	Type	Song or album	Notes
New Zealand Music Awards	2013	Best Pop Album	Six Strings and a Sailboat	Won
New Zealand Music Awards	2013	Best Female Solo Artist	Six Strings and a Sailboat	Nominated
New Zealand Music Awards	2013	Breakthrough Artist of the Year	Six Strings and a Sailboat	Nominated
