= Fly My Pretties =

New Zealand musical collaborative

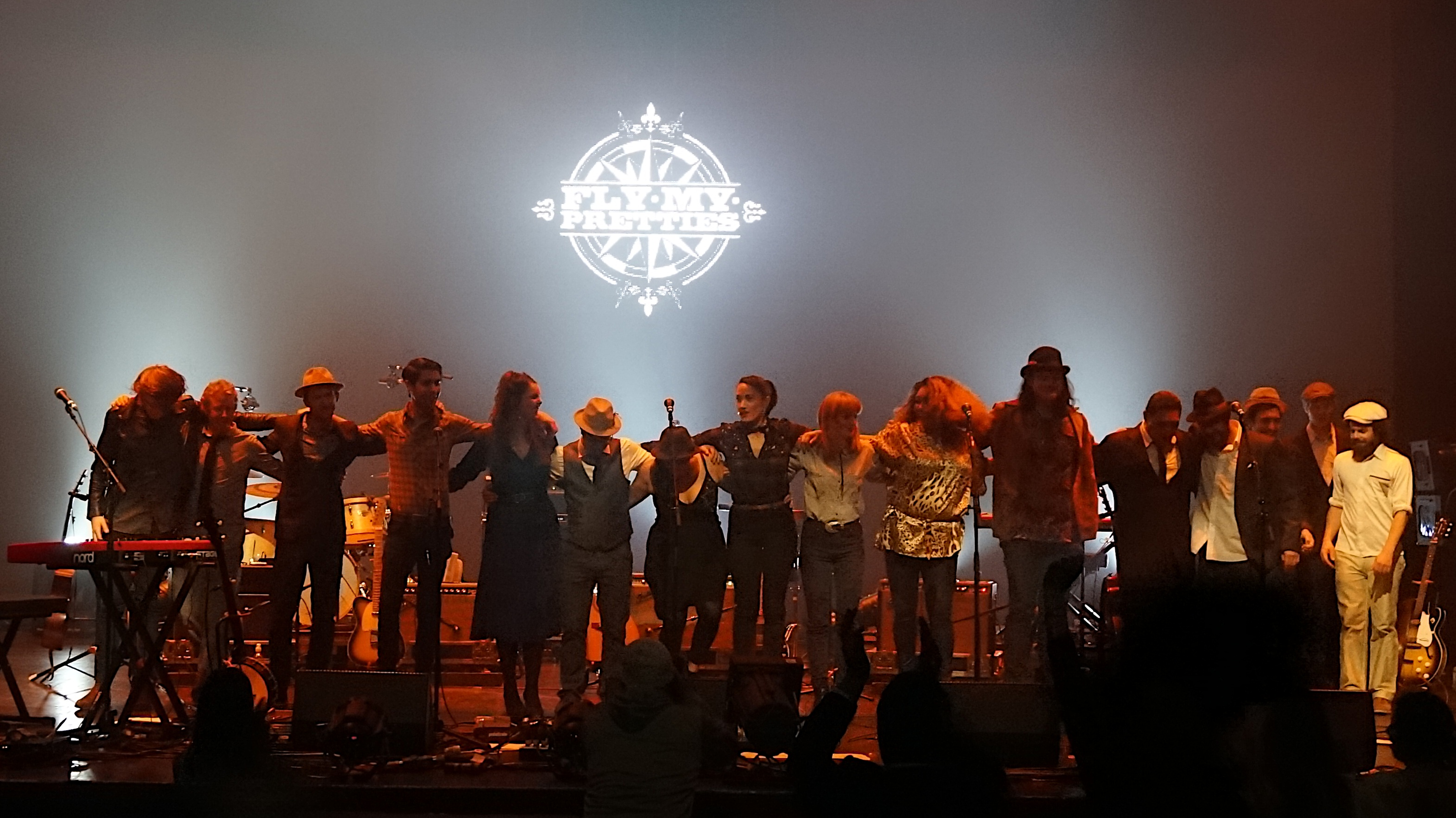
- Fly My Pretties on their Homeland Tour in 2013

Background information
- Origin: Wellington, New Zealand
- Years active: 2004–present
- Label: Loop
- Website: flymypretties.com

Fly My Pretties is a collaboration of musicians originally from Wellington, New Zealand who are known for coming together to record live albums, in various locations in New Zealand. The different musical backgrounds of the members make for an eclectic mix of songs on their releases. Fly My Pretties was the brainchild of Barnaby Weir, front man of the Black Seeds and Mikee Tucker of Loop Recordings Aot(ear)oa. The objective: To meet, exchange ideas, and then perform and record the results in front of a live audience.

== History ==
Founded in Wellington in 2004, the Fly My Pretties cast includes musicians from the Black Seeds, Fat Freddy's Drop, The Phoenix Foundation, Cairo Knife Fight and Paseload to achieve a unique blend of musical styles. The group is not a band as such, rather a collection of contemporary musicians who come together to collaborate on songs written by different members of the band. The first album featured songs written by Weir, Age Pryor and Samuel Flynn Scott.

Fly My Pretties performed their first season at Wellington's Bats Theatre over five nights. Their first album 'Fly My Pretties Live at Bats' achieved platinum status and was released internationally in the UK. The album received six nominations (Best Pop Release, Best Album, Best Producer, Best Cover Art, Best Female Vocalist, Best DVD) and won Best Pop Release at the 2005 bNet New Zealand Music Awards.

In 2006, Fly My Pretties performed, recorded, and released a second album, 'The Return of... Fly My Pretties' which focused on the state of contemporary Aotearoa New Zealand. The 2006 shows sold out and the second album reached platinum status. 'The Return of... Fly My Pretties' won Best Aotearoa, Roots album at the 2007 New Zealand Music Awards.

Fly My Pretties toured and recorded a new album in 2009 titled 'Fly My Pretties – A Story'. The show was a conceptual extension of the previous two Fly My Pretties outings, connecting music, illustration, animation, charity and a message of change into an audiovisual experience. The concept was to entertain and reflect on innocence, and the solving of complex problems which might enable a sustainable future. The band put together their songs in eight rehearsals before taking the show on the road. The album reached #1 on the top 40 RIANZ album charts. The third album was nominated for Best Aotearoa, Roots Album at the 2010 Vodafone new Zealand Music Awards.

The collective released 'Fly My Pretties IV' in 2011. The 16 new songs were performed, filmed and recorded live across nine shows during the eponymous "Fly My Pretties IV" tour, – which included the collective's first international appearance – one sold-out Melbourne date. The new Fly My Pretties show involved 16 musicians. In collaboration with street artist Flox, 16 original animations and other artworks were projected the show.

In 2013 Fly My Pretties embarked on the 'Homeland Tour' in 18 towns to perform 23 shows. The tour saw Fly My Pretties hark back to their musical roots with a sound stepped in folk, roots, soul & rock. They partnered with Archives New Zealand and the Alexander Turnbull Library, National Library of New Zealand to source historical footage from the regions toured. These were visually woven into each song's performance. The result of the tour was the collective's fifth album, 'The Homeland Recordings' – 13 tracks spanning country, folk, rock, R&B, and soul – all captured live.

Over the years, Fly My Pretties have only ever performed a small selection of shows outside of their tours including the prestigious WOMAD 2013 and Queenstown Blues & Roots Festival.

In 2025, the band released a new album titled Elemental, which features 11 musicians who appear on every track, breaking from the band's typical approach of different artists collaborating on different tracks. Elemental contributors include vocalists Riiki Reid, AJA, Tawaz, Taylah, Louis TM, Barnaby Weir, and Laughton Kora, rhythm performers Iraia Whakamoe and Aaron Stewart, guitarist Ryan Prebble, and Nigel Patterson on keyboard.

== Members ==
- Barnaby Weir (Vocals, Percussion & Guitar)
- Aaron Stewart (Electric bass, Acoustic Bass)
- Aaron Tokona (Guitar & Vocals)
- Adi Dick (Guitar & Vocals)
- Age Pryor (Guitar & Vocals)
- Amiria Grenell (Guitar & Vocals)
- Anna Coddington (Guitar, Vocals & Shaker)
- Anika Moa (Guitar & Vocals)
- Bailey Wiley (Vocals)
- Brendan Moran (Drums)
- Craig Terris (Drums & Vocals)
- Daniel Weetman (Drums, Percussion & Vocals)
- Darryn Sigley (Drums)
- Eva Prowse (Violin, Vocals, & Mandolin)
- Fran Kora (Vocals, Bass)
- Flip Grater (Guitar & Vocals)
- Hollie Smith (Guitar, Keyboards & Vocals)
- Iraia Whakamoe (Drums)
- James Coyle (Keys)
- Jarney Murphy (Drums)
- Jayson Norris (Guitar & Vocals)
- Justin 'Firefly' Clarke (Vocals, Guitar, Mandolin)
- Kara Gordon (Guitar & Vocals)
- L.A. Mitchell (Rhodes, Vocals)
- Laughton Kora (Guitar & Vocals)
- Lee Prebble (Lap Steel)
- Lisa Tomlins (Vocals)
- Louis McDonald (Guitar & Vocals)
- Louis TM (Keyboards & Vocals)
- Luke Buda (Guitar & Vocals)
- Mailee Mathews (Bass)
- Mara TK (Guitar, Bass, Tambourine & Vocals)
- Mark Vanilau (Vocals, Keys)
- Mel Parsons (Guitar & Vocals)
- Mike Fabulous (Bass & Guitar)
- Miloux (Vocals)
- Module (Piano, Keys & Organ)
- Nathan 'Nato' Hickey (Bass & Percussion)
- Ned Ngatae (Bass)
- Nigal Patterson (Keys)
- Paul McLaney (Guitar & Vocals)
- Ria Hall (Vocals & Percussion)
- Riki Gooch (Drums & Rhodes)
- Rio Hunuki-Hemopo (Vocals, Bass & Tambourine)
- Ryan Prebble (Guitar & Vocals)
- Samuel Flynn Scott (Vocals)
- Shaun Blackwell (Vocals, Guitar, Percussion)
- Tessa Rain (Guitar & Vocals)
- Toby Laing (Rhodes & Synth)
- Tom Watson (Guitar & Vocals)

== Discography ==
Year	Title	Label	Chart peak
2004	Live at Bats	Loop	—
2006	The Return of Fly My Pretties	Loop	14
2009	A Story (Part 1)	Loop	1
2012	Fly My Pretties IV	Loop	3
2013	The Homeland Recordings	Loop	9
2016	String Theory	Loop	4
2019	The Studio Recordings Pt. 1	Loop	14
2025	Elemental	Loop	23
