= Happy Ending (The Phoenix Foundation album) =

Studio album by The Phoenix Foundation
- Released: 8 October 2007
- Genre: Indie rock, Dream pop
- Length: 51:27
- Label: Flying Nun Records
- Producer: Lee Prebble

The Phoenix Foundation chronology
Pegasus (2005)	Happy Ending (2007)	Buffalo (2010)

Happy Ending is the third album by New Zealand band, The Phoenix Foundation. It was released in 2007.

Band member Richie Singleton described the album as "an attempt to capture how we play live".

"Bright Grey", "Bleaching Sun" and "40 Years" were released as singles. The music videos for "Bright Grey" and "40 Years" were directed by Taika Waititi.

== Track listing ==
1. "Bright Grey" – 5:03
2. "Bleaching Sun" – 4:29
3. "Slumber Party" – 4:20
4. "Gandalf" – 6:02
5. "40 Years" – 4:33
6. "Irrelevant Noise" – 3:59
7. "A Day in the Sun" – 2:34
8. "Pure Joy" – 4:27
9. "No One Will Believe Me When I'm Dead" – 3:30
10. "Omerta" – 5:30
11. "Burning Wreck" – 4:27
12. "Sugar" – 2:39
