= The Phoenix Foundation =

New Zealand indie rock band

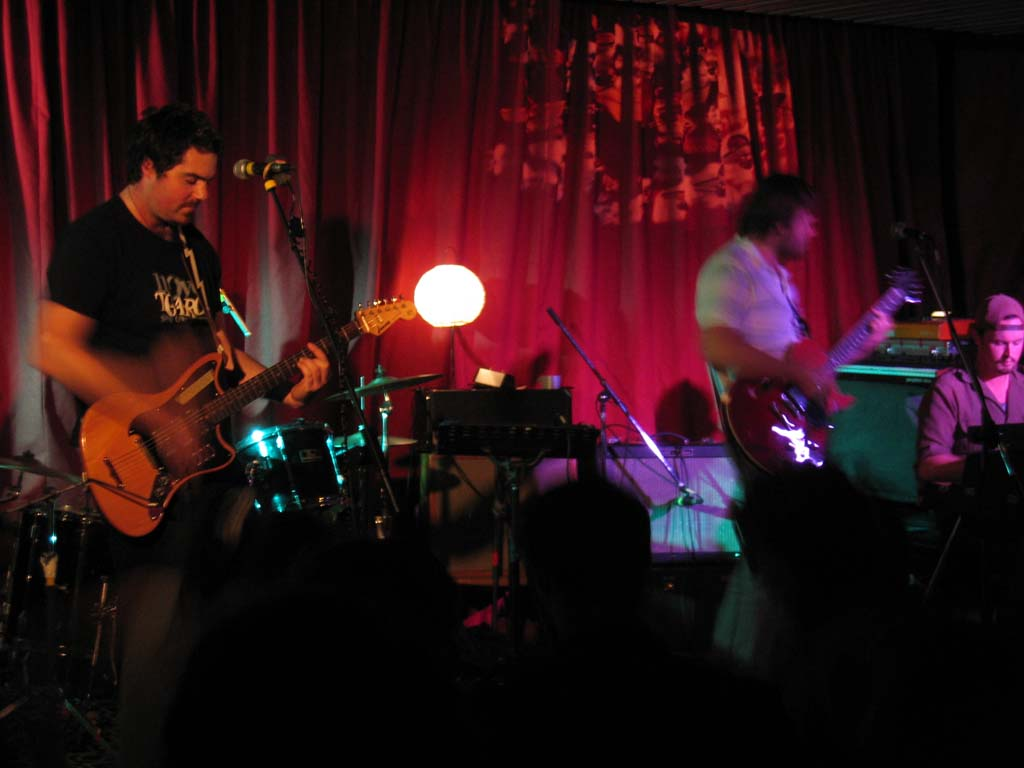

Background information
- Origin: Wellington, New Zealand
- Genre: Pop rock
- Years active: 1997–present
- Members: Samuel Flynn Scott; Luke Buda; Conrad Wedde; Tom Callwood; Will Ricketts; Chris O'Connor
- Past members: Richie Singleton; Warner Emery; Tim Hansen; Noel Phear; Tui Langford
- Website: thephoenixfoundation.co.nz

The Phoenix Foundation are a New Zealand indie rock band formed in Wellington in 1997. The core lineup consists of Samuel Flynn Scott, Luke Buda and Conrad Wedde who each contribute vocals, guitar, and keyboards, and collaborate on songwriting and arrangements. The Phoenix Foundation are known for their expansive sound, genre-blending style, use of homage and work on soundtracks, collaborating with directors such as Taika Waititi.

== History ==
=== The early years and China Cove EP (2000) ===
The Phoenix Foundation was formed in 1994 by Conrad Wedde, Samuel Flynn Scott, and Luke Buda while they were students at Wellington High School. Initially influenced by heavy metal, the trio later developed a more eclectic sound, drawing inspiration from artists including Air, Sparklehorse, Spiritualized, Pavement, Sly and the Family Stone, and The Ramones. They began recording on a school 4-track with the help of their future manager, Craig Pearce, and rehearsed in Wedde’s family garage. The group’s name taken from the fictional organisation featured in the 1980s television series MacGyver.

Following high school, the members leased a former Chinese mission hall on Frederick Street in central Wellington, which became a shared creative space for music, art, poetry and film. During this period, they experimented with a number of side projects, including one under the name Sauerkrauts, before developing a more psychedelic pop-rock sound.

By the late 1990s, the original rhythm section had departed and the group entered a hiatus. Buda moved to Zurich, while Wedde toured with the Indian Ink Theatre Company. Despite this, the band released its debut EP China Cove in 2000, but disbanded shortly afterwards.

A turning point came in 2001 when Buda returned to New Zealand and the core trio reunited to record "This Charming Van", which received airplay on BNet radio and sparked renewed public interest in the band.

In 2002, the Phoenix Foundation reformed with a new lineup, adding Will Ricketts on percussion, Tim Hansen on bass and Richie Singleton on drums. At a time when Wellington’s music scene was dominated by reggae and dance acts, and many rock bands had relocated overseas, the group began developing a more experimental and atmospheric approach to indie rock.

That same year, they began recording at The Surgery Studios in Wellington with engineer and producer Lee Prebble. The collaboration marked the beginning of a longstanding creative partnership that would continue across the band’s subsequent releases as well as numerous solo projects.

== Albums, EPs and singles ==
=== Horse Power (2003 Album) ===
The Phoenix Foundation released their debut album, Horse Power, in 2003. The recording sessions featured experimental recording techniques, such as placing microphones in ovens, buckets of water, and other unconventional spaces. Blending elements of alt-folk, psychedelia, electronica, and country, the album introduced the band’s eclectic sonic identity.

Songs such as “This Charming Van” and “Let Me Die a Woman”, which was originally recorded in Buda’s bedroom, received significant airplay on alternative radio stations including 95bFM and RDU-FM. The album also featured instrumental tracks—a hallmark of their later work—and drew on their early metal and funk influences, particularly in “Bruiser.”

Horse Power was among the most acclaimed New Zealand albums of 2003. It was the only release nominated for Best Album at both the Aotearoa Music Awards (AMA) and the BNet Awards, and was voted Best New Zealand Album of the Year by NZMusic.com. It also appeared in the Listener’s Top 10 Albums of 2003. At the 2004 Aotearoa Music Awards, the album was nominated for Album of the Year, with additional nominations for Lee Prebble for Best Engineer and Tania Mitchell for Best Album Cover

In 2007, Horse Power was released in the United States for the first time. Around the same period, The Phoenix Foundation began to attract international critical attention, receiving four- and five-star reviews from UK publications including Mojo, Uncut, and The Independent, where critic Andy Gill described them as “surely the most potent band to come out of New Zealand since the far-off days of The Chills.”

In 2023, Horse Power was remastered and released on vinyl for the first time, including both standard and limited-edition pressings, as part of its 20th anniversary celebrations. The album peaked at number one on the Official Aotearoa Top 20 NZ Albums Charts (Aotearoa Music Charts, or AMC), where it remained for three consecutive week.

=== Pegasus (2005 Album) ===
In 2004, The Phoenix Foundation began work on their second studio album, Pegasus, with Warner Emery replacing Tim Hansen on bass. The band took a more intensive approach than on their debut, spending six continuous weeks at Surgery tracking live band takes, followed by overdubs and mixing.

Musically, Pegasus marked a shift toward a darker, more cinematic sound. Instrumental tracks such as “Hitchcock” hinted at the band’s future soundtrack work, while layered arrangements and atmospheric production created a more immersive tone. The album featured contributions from guest musicians David Long, John White, Jeff Henderson, Warren Maxwell and the band’s former school music teacher, Fritz Wollner.

Reflecting on the album’s impact, Scott described Pegasus as “the point where people outside of us – DJs, music journos and our friends – started listening.”

Songs like “Damn the River” and “Gone Fishing” became fan favourites, supported by distinctive music videos – an element that would remain a consistent feature of the band’s work. That same year, The Phoenix Foundation opened for the Finn Brothers on their New Zealand tour, further consolidating their national profile.

At the 2005 AMA, Pegasus was nominated for Album of the Year. Additional nominations included Lee Prebble for Best Producer and Reuben Sutherland, alongside The Phoenix Foundation, for Best Music Video for "Hitchcock.

In May, 2025 the Phoenix Foundation released a Pegasus - 20th Anniversary Edition on limited edition transparent blue vinyl. Remastered and reissued under their own imprint, the release marked two decades since the album’s original debut.

Pegasus peaked at number seven on the AMC Top 40 Albums Chart where it remained for fourteen weeks. It peaked at number one on the Top 20 NZ Albums Charts, where it stayed for seven weeks.

=== Happy Ending (2007 Album) ===
The Phoenix Foundation released their third studio album, Happy Ending, in September 2007, which featured the single "Bright Grey".

Written during the band’s first U.S. tour earlier that year—where they played twelve shows over three weeks, including several dates with The Veils—Happy Ending reflected a more upbeat and confident sound. Tracks such as "Bleaching Sun", "40 Years" and "Bright Grey" showcased this tonal shift, with "Bright Grey" described by Scott as exploring themes of "future angst."

The album included contributions from guest musicians including Age Pryor, Tom Callwood, and Craig Terris. Both “Bright Grey” and “40 Years” became BNet Top 10 tracks, each supported by a music video directed by Taika Waititi, then an emerging filmmaker. Waititi also starred in “40 Years,” giving the video its distinctive offbeat tone.

Happy Ending received widespread critical acclaim. The New Zealand Herald called it "one of the best examples of pop music to come out of New Zealand".

The band’s connection with the Finn Brothers also continued to grow. In 2008, they supported Split Enz on their high-profile reunion tour, performing to large audiences across the country.

At the 2008 AMA, Happy Ending received nominations for Best Group, Best Rock Album, and Single of the Year for "Bright Grey." Lee Prebble won Best Producer and was also nominated for Best Engineer. That same year, “Bright Grey” was shortlisted for the APRA Silver Scroll Award which recognises excellence in New Zealand songwriting..

Happy Ending peaked at number five on the AMC Top 40 Albums Charts, where it remained for ten weeks.

=== Merry Kriskmass (2009 EP) ===
In December 2009, The Phoenix Foundation released Merry Kriskmass, a six-track EP developed during the sessions for their next studio album, Buffalo. The band described it as "a fun, slightly odd" project."

The release compiled tracks that didn’t fit the tone of the forthcoming album but highlighted the band's playful and experimental side. It was accompanied by a live performance opening for Jarvis Cocker in Wellington, offering audiences an early glimpse into the band’s evolving sound.

=== Buffalo (2010 Album) ===
The Phoenix Foundation released their fourth studio album, Buffalo, in New Zealand on 26 April 2010. Written over 18 months, the album was recorded at the band's rehearsal space, The Car Club, and at The Surgery.

Buffalo was the first Phoenix Foundation album to be released on vinyl. Most of the recorded material appeared on the final tracklist, while "Dickheads Abound" and "Middle Dream" were issued as digital bonus tracks. During the recording sessions, bassist Warner Emery amicably left the group and was replaced by Tom Callwood, who had previously contributed cello and double bass to earlier releases.

The album marked a musical and professional turning point for the group. Critics noted a more refined and cohesive sound, blending upbeat pop songs, ambient synth textures, and atmospheric ballads. The title track, with its stomping beat and surrealist lyrics, became one of the band’s most recognised songs. Other singles included "Flock of Hearts" and "Golden Ship."

In January 2011, Buffalo was released internationally. The album received widespread critical acclaim in the United Kingdom, including a five-star review in The Guardian and positive coverage in The Times and other publications.The album also received airplay on BBC 6 Music and led to a UK and European tour, culminating in a performance on Later... with Jools Holland in October 2011, where the band performed "Buffalo" and "Flock of Hearts."

Actor Russell Crowe shared his praise for the album on Twitter, calling it "pretty strange stuff," albeit misspelling the band’s name.

At the 2010 AMA, Buffalo was nominated for Album of the Year, Best Rock Album, and Single of the Year for "Buffalo." The Phoenix Foundation won Best Group and Best Producer. Lee Prebble won Best Engineer, and Paul Johnson won Best Album Cover. "Buffalo" was also nominated for Best Music Video, directed by Nathan Hickey.

The album was later nominated for the 2011 Taite Music Prize, New Zealand’s annual award for best album of the year.

In 2020, the band released Buffalo: 10 Year Anniversary Edition, which included seven previously unreleased tracks referred to as The Du Son EP, made available through a download code included with the vinyl edition.

In 2024, Buffalo was described by Radio New Zealand as an essential New Zealand album, and the band have referred to it as their most collaboratively written release.

Buffalo peaked at number four on the AMC Top 40 Albums Charts, where it remained for sixteen weeks, and was included in the End of Year Top 50 Albums.

=== Presents - 'A Very Dystopian Christmas!' (2011 EP) ===
In December 2011, The Phoenix Foundation self-released the EP Presents: A Very Dystopian Christmas!, featuring eight tracks of satirical holiday music that embraced their dreamier side. The band described it as “a mystical distraction from the crushing reality of yuletide consumption.” It was issued on CD and made available digitally.

=== Fandango (2013 Album) ===
The Phoenix Foundation released their fifth studio album, Fandango, on 26 April 2013 in New Zealand and Australia, with a UK and European release following soon after. Their first double album, it spans 78 minutes and was described by Scott as "test match music" – a long-form, immersive listen that plays the long game without rushing the innings.

The album was recorded over a 15-month period at various locations, including Roundhead Studios in Auckland, The Party Room in Dunedin, a barn on Tarureka Estate in Featherston, and The Car Club in Wellington. Mixing was completed by longtime collaborator Lee Prebble at The Surgery, alongside Brett Stanton and Neil Baldock. During this time, founding drummer Richie Singleton left the band to pursue environmental work and was replaced by Chris O'Connor.

Musically, Fandango covers a wide stylistic range, from the polished pop of "The Captain" to the krautrock-inspired "Black Mould" and the psychedelic folk textures of "Corale." The album closes with the 17-minute track "Friendly Society," which features backing vocals by Neil Finn and Lawrence Arabia. The song received mixed reviews, with some critics highlighting it as a standout and others viewing it as overly indulgent.

The album earned a five-star review from The New Zealand Herald and received positive coverage from international outlets including NME and The Independent. Reviewers noted its lyrical complexity and distinctive arrangements. BBC critic Daniel Ross praised the band’s "sublimely intelligent arranging skills" in their cover of Tim Hardin's "Don’t Make Promises You Can’t Keep".

Two weeks prior to its release, Fandango was previewed in full via an advance stream on The Guardian's website.

To support the album, The Phoenix Foundation toured extensively across the United Kingdom and Europe throughout mid-2013. They performed at major events including Glastonbury Festival and the world premiere of The Hobbit: An Unexpected Journey in Wellington, where they appeared alongside Neil Finn.

At the 2013 AMA, Fandango received five nominations, including Album of the Year, Best Group, Best Alternative Album. Lee Prebble and Brett Stanton won Best Producer and Best Engineer. The track “Thames Soup” was shortlisted for the 2013 APRA Silver Scroll Award, and the album was nominated for the 2014 Taite Music Prize.

Fandango peaked at number four on the AMC Top 40 Albums Charts, where it remained for six weeks, and peaked at number two on the AMC Top 20 NZ Albums Charts, for nineteen weeks.

=== Fleetwood Mac Tribute (2013 Single) ===
In 2013, The Phoenix Foundation contributed a cover of Fleetwood Mac's "Don’t Stop" to Mojo magazine’s Rumours Revisited tribute CD, released as a covermount on Mojo issue no. 230 (January 2013).

=== God Rest Ye Merry Men (2013 Single) ===
In December 2013, The Phoenix Foundation and Holly Beals recorded "God Rest Ye Merry Men" for Starship Hospital's Christmas album, Starship Christmas Album 2013.

=== Tom's Lunch (2014 EP) ===
Released on 19 May 2014, Tom’s Lunch marked a transitional moment for The Phoenix Foundation. It was the band’s first release with new drummer Chris O’Connor, following Fandango, and introduced a new chapter of shorter, more focused tracks. “Bob Lennon John Dylan” and another provocatively titled track were mixed by David Fridmann, known for his work with The Flaming Lips, MGMT, Tame Impala. Both tracks had previously appeared as a limited-edition 7-inch for Record Store Day.

The EP was supported by a seven-date New Zealand tour, and the cover featured a photo of bassist Tom Callwood’s actual lunch.

Though brief at 23 minutes, Tom’s Lunch offered a glimpse into the band’s evolving sound and growing dynamic with new drummer Chris O’Connor. It demonstrated their ability to shift styles while maintaining their signature depth and inventiveness. One review described the EP as featuring "disco grinding, electro funk, and heart-stirring rock."

The song "Bob Lennon John Dylan" was shortlisted for the 2014 Silver Scroll Award.

Tom's Lunch peaked at number seven on the AMC Top 40 Albums Charts, where it remained for three weeks. On the AMC Top 20 NZ Albums Charts, it peaked at number two for six weeks.

=== Big Mac (Run Rate) (2015 Single) ===
Released in March 2015 as a digital standalone, "Big Mac (Run Rate)" was written and recorded in support of the New Zealand cricket team during the ICC Cricket World Cup. The single featured saxophonist Lucien Johnson.

=== Give Up Your Dreams (2015 Album) ===
The Phoenix Foundation released their sixth studio album, Give Up Your Dreams, on 7 August 2015. Departing from their earlier acoustic leanings, the album marked a stylistic shift toward rhythm-heavy, synth-driven arrangements, described by the band as "astral", "cosmic" and "full of technicolour sparkle".

Built on a foundation of layered synths, marimba textures, tribal beats and minimal acoustic guitar, the album was conceived through an intuitive, exploratory process, with the band spending considerable time experimenting with effects units such as the Eventide H3000. This shift followed a lineup change, with drummer Chris O’Connor fully integrated into the band’s rhythm-focused direction..

Thematically, Give Up Your Dreams explores creative disillusionment and acceptance, reflecting the band’s recognition that, despite domestic success, international commercial breakthroughs had remained elusive. The title track was inspired by a conversation with musician James Milne also known as Lawrence Arabia, who encouraged the band to relinquish career expectations and focus instead on the joy of making music.

“It’s sort of the opposite of that American idea of excellence,” said Scott. “I’m screaming ‘I’m a loser and I’m losing my belief,’ but the pitch-shifted wiser version of myself assures me, ‘You’re not a loser, you’re a human… and I love you.'’

The album was accompanied by two music videos, including a surreal visual for the title track featuring actor Bret McKenzie from Flight of the Conchords digging a hole in a landscape reminiscent of Andrei Tarkovsky's films.

Other notable tracks include "Mountain," with its hypnotic afro-kraut groove, and "Playing Dead" which was inspired by ghost rituals of the Tierra del Fuego people. The album also featured "Bob Lennon John Dylan", previously released on Fandango—a pop-driven homage to songwriting icons. The track was mixed by David Fridmann, whom Scott described as "someone we’ve wanted to work with since we started the band", citing The Flaming Lips as one of the bands early influences.

Critics praised the album’s ambition and character, describing it as "joyous," "a skilled rumination on existential quandaries," and "an adventurous return to form."

The band supported the release with an eight-show national tour across New Zealand.

Give Up Your Dreams was nominated for the 2016 Taite Music Prize, the title track was also shortlisted for the 2016 APRA Silver Scroll Award.

On the AMC Top 40 Albums Charts, Give Up Your Dreams peaked at number two and remained there for seven weeks. On the AMC Top 20 NZ Albums Charts, it reached number one, holding the top spot for twenty-one weeks.

=== Tranquility (2020 Single) ===
On 14 July 2020, The Phoenix Foundation released the single “Tranquility”, featuring Hollie Fullbrook of Tiny Ruins and clarinet by composer Jeff Henderson.

=== Friend Ship (2020 Album) ===
On 16 October 2020, The Phoenix Foundation released their seventh studio album, Friend Ship. The record marked a shift in both tone and collaboration, featuring guest appearances from Hollie Fullbrook, Nadia Reid, Anita Clark of Motte, and Dave Dobbyn. Two tracks, "Miserable Meal" and "Transit of Venus", featured arrangements performed by the New Zealand Symphony Orchestra.

According to Scott, the band’s intention with Friend Ship was to return to songwriting at its core, in contrast to the performance-driven Give Up Your Dreams. “We really went there on the performance side of Give Up Your Dreams,” Scott told AudioCulture. “But that’s maybe less of my focus, and I’m always quite interested in the songs.”

Thematically, Friend Ship explores contemporary stress and anxiety, while also addressing the growing urgency of climate change and society’s tendency to look the other way.

The album was described as a celebration of connection and long-term creative friendship. In an interview with Radio New Zealand, Scott acknowledged the title Friend Ship was “pretty cheesy,” but felt it captured the spirit of the project. He also noted the inclusion of more female voices as a reflection of the band’s evolving outlook and listening habits.

The songs were developed over a five-year period and recorded in bedrooms, garages, sleepouts, and spare rooms. Tracks such as “Hounds of Hell” combine sardonic humour with reflections on family and connection. Reflecting on the process, the band described bringing together long-time collaborators, classical musicians, and a Polish choir—a nod to Buda’s ancestry—as both humbling and surreal. Scott called it “a spirit of communal creation we’ve always aspired to, but never quite achieved before". In a separate interview with Stuff, Buda reflected on the band’s enduring personal history: “We were all 14. Now we’re all 41, with the same mates. That’s kind of disgusting,” he joked.

Friend Ship was supported by the band’s first national tour in five years, and was widely praised for its warmth and emotional depth. Stuff described the album as a work of “solace in the human condition” amid the COVID-19 era. PopMatters noted the balance between serious subject matter and detailed pop craftsmanship, stating that "there are no standouts because they are all standouts", while NARC Magazine praised the songwriting despite suggesting that "Landline" was somewhat out of step with the rest of the record. A Radio Hauraki DJ noted on the Off The Record podcast that seven songs from the album ranked in the station’s ten most-played tracks of 2020.

In 2021, following the album’s release, the band shared the Life Boat EP—a two-track release featuring songs recorded during the Friend Ship sessions, including a track featuring Fazerdaze. Though stylistically aligned with the album, the tracks were not included in the final release. Instead, the band presented the EP as a companion piece.

Friend Ship was nominated for the 2021 Taite Music Prize.

On the AMC Top 40 Albums Charts Friend Ship peaked at number three for one week, and peaked at number two for eight weeks on the AMC Top 20 NZ Albums Charts.

=== Whistling in the Darkness / Ritual Hex (2024 Double single) ===
Released digitally alongside “Ritual Hex” in December 2023, “Whistling in the Darkness” marked a return to experimentation for The Phoenix Foundation. Recorded “live-ish” at The Surgery between two weekends of Camp A Low Hum, the track features Anita Clark on violin and vocals.

Blending catchy psych-folk with cryptic, socially charged lyrics, the song questions whether the "chaos in the streets tonight" is a sales event or something far more sinister. The lyrics include lines such as "We’ll open carry with open hearts" and "The squeaky wheel gets the grease, while the butcher gets the golden geese".

Under The Radar described the track as a response to the chaos of modern politics and society, praising the band's lyricism for “staving off paralytic dread” in the face of “our present-day reality's intentionally divisive socio-political hellscape.” The final whistle was noted as both a literal and symbolic act of resilience.

"Ritual Hex" incorporates leftfield grooves, Madchester-inspired rhythms and mutant disco energy. Featuring a hypnotic mantra of "You got cursed", the track blends laconic lyrics with snaking basslines and studio experimentation. It was described as a "butt-wiggling flipside" to the apocalyptic tone of its sibling single.

In an interview on Radio Hauraki’s Off the Record, Scott explained that the band chose to focus on new material after spending 2023 commemorating the 20th anniversary of their debut album Horse Power. With another milestone approaching, they opted to sidestep further retrospectives. "Last year we had the 20th anniversary of our first album… now our second album’s anniversary is coming up, and we were like, we’ve gotta make some new music before our manager makes us do another anniversary album," he said. Scott also confirmed that the band were actively working on a new album, with additional material expected to follow the release of the two singles.

== 20th Anniversary milestones ==
=== Celebrate! Tour with the NZSO (2018) ===
In 2018, to mark 20 years as a band, The Phoenix Foundation collaborated with the New Zealand Symphony Orchestra on a four-show national tour titled Celebrate! The performances featured orchestral arrangements of tracks from Horse Power and Pegasus, reimagined by New Zealand composers Gareth Farr, Claire Cowan, Chris Gendall, and Hamish Oliver. The concerts were conducted by NZSO principle conductor Hamish McKeich.

The project was praised for its ambition and musical cohesion. Hayden Green of Radio New Zealand Music described it as "a stunning performance", writing, "I can’t think of another contemporary New Zealand band that would suit the NZSO treatment as well". The Spinoff called the collaboration “a triumph,” highlighting the band’s stylistic range and ability to “work with an orchestra, not against it".

The project also marked the beginning of The Phoenix Foundation's ongoing relationship with the NZSO, who later recorded arrangements for the band’s seventh studio album, Friend Ship.

=== Horse Power 20th anniversary tour (2023) ===
In 2023, The Phoenix Foundation marked the 20th anniversary of their debut album Horse Power with a national tour, performing the record in full for the first time. The Horse Power 20th Anniversary Tour featured all eleven tracks from the album and included long-time collaborator Anita Clark. Special guest Jess Cornelius, accompanied by LA-based multi-instrumentalist Mikal Cronin, supported the tour. Speaking ahead of the shows, Buda described the performances as “a deep nostalgic trip mixed with a sweet fresh vibe.”

To accompany the tour, Horse Power was remastered and released on vinyl for the first time, available in both 12-inch and a limited edition 12-inch plus 7-inch formats. Reflecting on the delay, Scott said: “We desperately wanted to release it on vinyl, but that obscure pursuit would have to wait a couple of decades… Listening to the test pressing now is like the final realisation of those original teenage dreams". In a review, 95bFM revisited critic Nick Bollinger’s original praise for Horse Power, in which he called it "the best first album I had heard in years"—a verdict the station stated still held true two decades later.

The band also released a digital Horse Power Live EP, featuring recordings from Radio New Zealand, including "St Kevin", recorded live with the New Zealand Symphony Orchestra in 2018; "The Swarm", recorded live at Helen’s in 2004; and "Bruiser", recorded live at WOMAD in 2008.

== Other projects ==
=== Harmony House (2016 Album) ===
In 2016, Dave Dobbyn approached Scott and Buda to produce his album Harmony House. The pair played much of the instrumentation and co-wrote several tracks. Mixed at The Surgery by Dr. Lee Prebble, the album peaked at number five for ten weeks on AMC Top 40 Albums Charts.

=== One Journey Leads to Another (2017 tourism campaign) ===
In 2017, The Phoenix Foundation recorded a cover of Iggy Pop's The Passenger for Tourism New Zealand's international campaign One Journey Leads to Another. Developed by TBWA Sydney, the mobile-led campaign featured a vertical-format film showcasing regional travel experiences across New Zealand. The campaign was released globally via platforms such as Facebook, Google, WeChat, and Qyer.

== Film and television composition ==
Founding members Luke Buda, Samuel Flynn Scott, and Conrad Wedde have built a parallel career in screen composition under the moniker Moniker.

Since 2007, the trio has scored a wide range of film and television projects, both in New Zealand and internationally. Their long-running collaborations with director Taika Waititi include Eagle vs Shark (2007), Boy (2010) and Hunt for the Wilderpeople (2016). Other notable credits include Wellington Paranormal, Cleverman, and Until Proven Innocent.

Their work has received both critical and industry recognition. The score for Boy won Best Original Music in a Feature Film at the 2010 Qantas Film and Television Awards. They were finalists for the same category at the 2016 APRA Silver Scroll Awards for Hunt for the Wilderpeople, and won Best Original Music in a Series for Cleverman in 2018. Additional nominations include Night Raiders and Wellington Paranormal.

In 2020, Buda reflected on the band’s shift toward composing for screen: “Some of us might prefer to just tour the world and play massive Phoenix Foundation gigs and make money that way, but that’s not reality. Making soundtracks is very cool work… I spend all day working alongside my best mates, and I love the fact that I can finally almost pay my mortgage with music.”

Under the name Moniker, the trio have also composed music for international productions such as Skylanders Academy (Netflix/Activision) and Saving Bikini Bottom: The Sandy Cheeks Movie, which featured recording sessions with the New Zealand Symphony Orchestra.

== Individual work and collaborations ==
=== Luke Buda ===
Buda has released three solo albums: Special Surprise (2006), Vesuvius (2008), and Buda (2021). Buda featured contributions from Don McGlashan, Joe Lindsay, Toby Laing, Riki Gooch, Dayle Jellyman, Jacqui Nyman, Anita Clark, and members of The Phoenix Foundation, and was nominated for the 2022 Taite Music Prize.

He has also released a number of EPs and singles, including Covers (Volumes 1–3, 2020–2022), Candy Candy (2021, a collaboration with Nick Brinkman, and Very Special Feelings (2024).

In 2009, Buda won the APRA Silver Scroll Award for co-writing “Apple Pie Bed” with James Milne.

Buda has performed with several other groups. He was a member of Cassette, a Wellington-based indie rock band active throughout the 2000s, alongside Tom Watson, Craig Terris, Dave Fraser, Paul Trigg, and Andrew Bain. He is also a member of TEETH, a band formed with Tom Callwood, Anthony Donaldson, and David Long. Their self-titled debut album was released in 2018 and was described by Radio New Zealand as “a bit like The Clean, but with chops.”

=== Samuel Flynn Scott ===
In 2004, Scott formed the band Bunnies on Ponies. After a run of live shows around Wellington, he released his debut solo album, The Hunt Brings Us Life, in 2006. The band featured drummer Craig Terris, bassist Tom Callwood—who played a key role in shaping the music—and keyboardist/guitarist Matt Armitage. Guest contributors included David Long, Riki Gooch, and Mike Fabulous.

His second solo album, Straight Answer Machine, followed in 2008 under the name Samuel F. Scott & the B.O.P., featuring the same core backing band. Additional contributors included Thomas Watson, Age Pryor, Lee Prebble, James Milne, Will Ricketts, Conrad Wedde, James Coyle and Julia Deans.

In 2014, Bunnies on Ponies released Heat Death of the Universe as a trio with Scott, Callwood and Terris. The album was praised for its stripped-back production and taut songwriting. Scott’s songwriting resonated with both critics and audiences. The Sunday Star Times wrote that “Scott’s best melodies stick in your head as firmly as your own teeth."

Scott has also performed and recorded with Fly My Pretties, Flash Harry, and The Boomshack.

=== Conrad Wedde ===
Wedde has released two solo albums under the name T.C. Wedde. His debut album, Bronze (2008), is a largely instrumental collection of electronic compositions, blending subtle guitar work with ambient textures. The album was described as "Kraftwerk-y, Jean Michel Jarre meets Boards Of Canada". Guests contributors included Craig Terris, Luke Buda and Will Ricketts, Sophie Burbery, Puck Murphy and DJ Tasker.

In 2014, Wedde followed with Spaceworld, an album that fuses lo-fi tape textures, psychedelic synths, and ambient instrumentation. The album was praised for its evocative, transcendental quality. Guest contributors included Chris O'Connor, William Ricketts, Toki Wilson and John White.

=== Other band members ===
Other longtime members of The Phoenix Foundation have also forged significant musical paths outside the band. Will Ricketts, Chris O’Connor, Warner Emery, Richie Singleton, and Tom Callwood have each pursued work as solo artists, composers, producers and collaborators. Their projects span a wide range of genres and reflect deep involvement in New Zealand’s broader music scene.

== Discography ==
The Phoenix Foundation discography
- Studio albums: 7
- Extended plays: 8
- Singles: 8

=== Studio albums ===
Year	Title	Details	Peak (Official Top 40) NZ
2003	Horse Power	Released: 21 May 2003; Label: The Phoenix Foundation / Capital Recordings; Catalogue: CREC1012	—
2005	Pegasus	Released: 15 May 2005; Label: The Phoenix Foundation / Festival Mushroom Records (FMR); Catalogue: 338462	7
2007	Happy Ending	Released: 8 Oct 2007; Label: The Phoenix Foundation / Flying Nun Records; Catalogue: FNCD503	5
2010	Buffalo	Released: 26 Apr 2010; Label: EMI New Zealand / Slow Boat Records / International release Memphis Industries; Catalogue: 6330712	4
2013	Fandango	Released: 26 Apr 2013; Label: The Phoenix Foundation / Universal Music NZ; Catalogue: 81876	4
2015	Give Up Your Dreams	Released: 7 Aug 2015; Label: The Phoenix Foundation / Memphis Industries; Catalogue: MI0372	2
2020	Buffalo: 10 Year Anniversary Edition	Released: 5 Jun 2020; Label: The Phoenix Foundation / Memphis Industries; Catalogue: MI0170LPX; Vinyl, LP, Reissue	—
2020	Friend Ship	Released: 16 Oct 2020; Label: The Phoenix Foundation / Universal Music New Zealand / Memphis Industries; Catalogue: MI0637LP	3
2023	Horse Power - 20th Anniversary Edition	Released: 23 Nov 2023; Label: The Phoenix Foundation; Vinyl, LP, Reissue, Remastered	1
2025	Pegasus - 20th Anniversary Edition	Released: 15 May 2025; Label: The Phoenix Foundation; Vinyl, LP, Reissue, Remastered	1
"—" denotes a recording that did not chart or was not released in that territory.

=== EPs ===
Year	Title	Details	Peak NZ
2000	China Cove	Released: 2001; Label: Lovely Horse Records; Catalogue: D6378	—
2009	Merry Kriskmass!	Released: Dec 2009; Label: The Phoenix Foundation; Catalogue: LHRTPF02	—
2011	Presents - 'A Very Dystopian Christmas!'	Released: Dec 2011; Label: The Phoenix Foundation	—
2014	Tom's Lunch	Released: 16 May 2014; Label: The Phoenix Foundation; Catalogue: 82050	7
2015	Trans Fatty Acid	Released 17 Aug 2015; Limited edition, cassette only release; Label: Memphis Industries; Catalogue: MI0372CS	—
2014	Bob Lennon John Dylan	Released: 19 Apr 2014; Label: Memphis Industries; Catalogue: MI0321S	—
2021	Life Boat	Released: 21 Apr 2014; Label: Memphis Industries; Catalogue: MI0637S	—
2023	Horse Power (Live)	Released: 17 Nov 2023; Label: The Phoenix Foundation; Digital format; Live recordings from 2004 to 2018	—
"—" denotes a recording that did not chart or was not released in that territory.

=== Singles ===
Year	Title	Album
2007	"Bright Grey"	Happy Ending
2013	"The Captain"	Fandango
2013	"God Rest Ye Merry Men"	Non-album single
2014	"Dalston Junction"	Non-album single
2014	"Bob Lennon John Dylan"	Tom's Lunch EP
2015	"Mountain"	Give Up Your Dreams
2015	"Big Mac (Run Rate)"	Non-album single
2020	"Tranquility"	Non-album single
2024	"Whistling in the Darkness / Ritual Hex"	Non-album double single

== Awards ==
=== Aotearoa Music Awards ===
The Aotearoa Music Awards recognise excellence across New Zealand’s music industry.

Year	Recipient / Work	Award	Result
2004	Horse Power	Album of the Year	Nominated
2004	Lee Prebble - Horse Power	Best Engineer	Nominated
2004	Tania Mitchell - Horse Power	Best Album Cover	Nominated
2005	Pegasus	Album of the Year	Nominated
2005	Rueben Sutherland and The Phoenix Foundation - "Hitchcock"	Best Music Video	Nominated
2005	Lee Prebble - Pegasus	Best Producer	Nominated
2008	"Bright Grey"	Single of the Year	Nominated
2008	Happy Ending	Best Group	Nominated
2008	Happy Ending	Best Rock Album	Nominated
2008	Lee Prebble - Happy Ending	Best Producer	Won
2008	Lee Prebble - Happy Ending	Best Engineer	Nominated
2010	Buffalo	Album of the Year	Nominated
2010	"Buffalo"	Single of the Year	Nominated
2010	"Buffalo"	Best Group	Won
2010	Buffalo	Best Rock Album	Nominated
2010	Buffalo	Best Producer	Won
2010	Lee Prebble - Buffalo	Best Engineer	Won
2010	Paul Johnson - Buffalo	Best Album Cover	Won
2010	Nathan Hickey - "Buffalo"	Best Music Video	Nominated
2013	Fandango	Album of the Year	Nominated
2013	Fandango	Best Group	Nominated
2013	Fandango	Best Alternative Album	Nominated
2013	Lee Prebble & Brett Stanton - Fandango	Best Producer	Won
2013	Lee Prebble & Brett Stanton - Fandango	Best Engineer	Won

=== Taite Music Prize ===
The Taite Music Prize recognises outstanding New Zealand albums.

Year	Album	Result
2011	Buffalo	Nominated
2014	Fandango	Nominated
2016	Give Up Your Dreams	Nominated
2021	Friend Ship	Nominated

=== APRA Silver Scroll Awards ===
The APRA Silver Scroll Awards celebrate excellence in New Zealand songwriting.

Year	Song	Result
2008	"Bright Grey"	Shortlisted
2013	"Thames Soup"	Shortlisted
2014	"Bob Lennon John Dylan"	Shortlisted
2016	"Give Up Your Dreams"	Shortlisted
