= Rewind (Jamie McDell song) =

Single by Jamie McDell

from the album Six Strings and a Sailboat
- Released: June 13, 2012
- Recorded: York Street Studio
- Genre: Pop
- Length: 3:34
- Label: EMI Music New Zealand
- Songwriter: Jamie McDell

Jamie McDell singles chronology
"You'll Never Take That Away" (2012)	"Rewind" (2012)	"Life in Sunshine" (2012)

Music video
- "Rewind" on YouTube

"Rewind" is the second single by New Zealand singer-songwriter Jamie McDell. It was released digitally on 13 July 2012, as the first single from her debut album Six Strings and a Sailboat. It was written and composed by McDell, and recorded at York Street Studio in Auckland. "Rewind" topped the Top 20 New Zealand Singles chart, which features singles by New Zealand artists, on 23 July 2012. McDell considers "Rewind" to be her official debut single.

== Background ==
McDell announced via Facebook on 24 April 2012, that her second single would be "Rewind". She explains:

I’m excited about releasing ‘Rewind’ because I consider it to be my first proper official single. I’m so surprised as to how well ‘You’ll Never Take That Away’ has done when it was always just going to be a fun introductory song. The same with the video being really laid back and with a DIY kind of feel, it will be awesome to film a proper music video for ‘Rewind’ and I can't wait to see how it all turns out and to share it with you all!

An acoustic version was also recorded for her debut EP, All That I Wanted - Acoustic EP, along with an acoustic music video.

== Songwriting and lyrics ==
The song is about a past relationship that she had over the summer that failed. In an interview with New Zealand radio station, The Edge FM, she explained that the lyric "rewind five times" represents five occasions that she would like to forget. The meaning behind the song was posted by McDell via Facebook on 24 April 2012:

The song was inspired by a relationship I had over the summer. It was your typical summer romance, guy meets girl at the beach, and they fall in love and have the most amazing summer together. Unfortunately the relationship didn't end very well, we had a falling out that made me see things differently and that's when I got inspiration to write ‘Rewind’. The song is about wanting to forget the relationship and everything that happened. I was definitely upset when everything ended and I just wanted to forget that anything had ever happened so I could just be happy again. All together the song is about me remembering that the relationship was good at the time, however, the way it ended made me think it would be easier to forget the whole thing. It's an important song to me because I feel like it shows a different side to my song writing and also expresses a bit more about my background and how I use song writing to deal with the things that happen in my life.

== Music video ==
The official music video for "Rewind" was filmed at Pakiri Beach, New Zealand, and was released on 12 July 2012. McDell states it is her first professional music video in comparison to the laid-back, do-it-yourself feel of "You'll Never Take That Away". She explains the video "pretty much represents exactly what the song is about" and focuses on her looking back on the relationship. It features flashback scenes of happy memories which eventuate to a critical point in the relationship where it falls apart, ending with McDell finding comfort in music.

An additional music video was also filmed for the acoustic version of the song that features on All That I wanted – Acoustic EP.

== Chart performance ==
"Rewind" entered and debuted on the Official New Zealand Top 40 at No. 30 on 23 July 2012, and is her second song to enter the chart. The single also topped the Top 20 New Zealand Singles chart (which features singles by New Zealand artists) on 23 July 2012.

Singles chart (2012)	Peak position
New Zealand Top 40 Singles	30
Top 20 New Zealand Singles	1
