= Hamish McKeich =

New Zealand conductor

- Born: Hamish John McKeich; 13 May 1967 (age 59); Christchurch, New Zealand
- Genre: Classical
- Occupation: Conductor
- Instrument: Bassoon
- Member of: New Zealand Symphony Orchestra

Hamish John McKeich (born 13 May 1967) is a New Zealand bassoon player and conductor. He is principal conductor in residence of the New Zealand Symphony Orchestra.

== Early life and education ==
McKeich was born in Christchurch on 13 May 1967, the son of Aroya and Ross McKeich, and grew up there, attending Burnside High School. He came from a musical family; he learnt the oboe and then the bassoon once his fingers were big enough. His father was his first bassoon teacher and he continued his bassoon studies at Wellington Polytechnic with Colin Hemmingsen. He later moved to Sydney to continue studying with bassoonist Gordon Skinner.

== Career ==
Before going to Australia McKeich was a contract player with the New Zealand Symphony Orchestra (NZSO) and then associate principal bassoon of the Sydney Symphony Orchestra. In Europe he played in the Philharmonia and Netherlands Philharmonic. During his 10 years in Europe he studied conducting under Ilya Musin, Valery Gergiev, Sian Edwards and Peter Eötvös. His desire to study conducting was stimulated by wanting to work with the whole orchestra and its repertoire.

In 1999 McKeich returned to New Zealand and joined the NZSO as a bassoon player. In 2002 he was appointed an associate conductor with the NZSO becoming principal conductor in residence in 2020. He has also conducted other orchestras in New Zealand: the Southern Symphonia, the Auckland Philharmonia and the Christchurch Symphony. He became the conductor of Stroma, a contemporary music ensemble in Wellington, which formed in 2000. McKeich has also developed a career internationally working with many orchestras.

In 2007 McKeich took a group of musicians, including some from the NZSO, on a tour to China. The orchestra was called the New Zealand Philharmonic Orchestra but confusion with the name New Zealand Symphony Orchestra caused the prime minister Helen Clark to question the tour.

McKeich has promoted contemporary music as part of the orchestral repertoire. He has also collaborated with musicians and performers from other genres including the band The Phoenix Foundation, jazz musician Nathan Haines, the band Shapeshifter and singer Teeks, who performed with the NZSO in 2022.

In 2021, after conducting a performance of Stravinsky's The Soldier's Tale, McKeich had a stroke which left him paralysed on his right side. Following intensive rehabilitation he has been able to resume conducting with one hand.

== Awards ==
In 2012 McKeich was awarded a citation by the Douglas Lilburn Trust for outstanding services to music in New Zealand.
