= Eagle vs Shark =

2007 film by Taika Waititi

- American theatrical release poster
- Directed by: Taika Waititi
- Written by: Taika Waititi
- Story by: Loren Horsley; Taika Waititi
- Produced by: Cliff Curtis; Ainsley Gardiner
- Starring: Jemaine Clement; Loren Horsley; Craig Hall; Joel Tobeck
- Cinematography: Adam Clark
- Edited by: Jonathan Woodford-Robinson
- Music by: The Phoenix Foundation
- Production companies: Whenua Films; New Zealand Film Commission; Unison Films
- Distributed by: Hoyts Distribution
- Release date: 15 June 2007
- Running time: 88 minutes
- Country: New Zealand
- Language: English
- Budget: $1.3 million
- Box office: $1.2 million

Eagle vs Shark is a 2007 New Zealand romantic comedy film written and directed by Taika Waititi in his directorial debut, and financed by the New Zealand Film Commission. The film had its world premiere at Sundance in the World Cinema Dramatic section of the festival. It received mixed reviews.

== Plot ==
Lily, a shy, wistful girl, is a songwriter when no one is listening. She works at a Wellington fast food restaurant and has a crush on Jarrod, a geek who works in a video game store. One day, Jarrod gives Lily an invitation to his "dress as your favourite animal" party to pass along to her workmate Jenny, who throws it away. Lily retrieves it and shows up at the party with her caring and supportive brother Damon.

The party is sparsely attended with what are apparently teenage and adult customers of Jarrod's store, all dressed extravagantly in animal costumes. Jarrod is impressed with Lily's shark costume as well as her remarkable video game skills. They go to Jarrod's room and he learns Lily's parents both died of heart attacks. He says his brother and mother are dead, too. They kiss and have brief sex.

The following day, Jarrod invites Lily on a date but fails to turn up. He later comes by Lily's house to apologise, saying he was depressed and needed to be alone. He confides that he plans to confront his high-school bully Eric, but has no car to get to his "hometown". Damon agrees to drive Jarrod and Lily to his hometown. Along the way, Damon offers them apples, which will become the representation of Jarrod and Lily in several claymation scenes throughout the film.

Upon arriving, Lily discovers that Jarrod's family is just as bizarre as Jarrod himself. His sister and brother-in-law sell all kinds of questionable products, like make-up kits and jumpsuits. Jarrod's father is a withdrawn man who uses a wheelchair. Jarrod's nine-year-old daughter Vinny, the product of a random sexual encounter who Jarrod sees only occasionally, also lives with Jarrod's family. They don't have room in the house, so Jarrod and Lily have to sleep in a tent in the yard.

It becomes clear his father's favourite son was Jarrod's brother Gordon, an accomplished athlete. Jarrod spends his time trying to win his dad's affection and training for his impending fight with Eric. Jarrod learns from his friend, computer geek Mason, that Eric will be in town the next day.

Gordon's equally successful fiancée Tracy comes over, and it seems Jarrod's father also loves her more than Jarrod. Jarrod breaks up with Lily, saying he's too busy with his revenge mission and "too complex" for a relationship. Lily is visibly upset but tries to hide it. Jarrod takes flowers over to Tracy's house and spends the day with her on the beach.

Lily and Vinny push Jarrod's father around town, coming to a hill. He angrily refuses to go any further and goes home. Lily and Vinny continue up the hill where the little girl reveals that Gordon did not die saving a child from a fire as Jarrod had said, but by committing suicide throwing himself off the cliff. Later, Lily learns Jarrod lied about his mother's death, too.

At a family dinner, Lily tells a silly joke, making everybody laugh. Jarrod appears jealous. Later, Jarrod's father watches an old tape where Gordon wins a race. Feeling even more alienated, Jarrod falsely announces that he is dating Tracy. Annoyed by Jarrod's behaviour, Lily decides to attend a local party, where she gets drunk and dances with a lot of boys while Jarrod jealously looks on. She spends the night in the bushes, and in the morning Jarrod berates her for making him worry.

That afternoon, Jarrod, with his family and friends watching, confronts Eric and finds out that Eric has lost the use of his legs. Eric apologises for having been a bully, but Jarrod attacks him anyway. Eric easily overpowers Jarrod, and only relents when Jarrod's father intervenes. Depressed, Jarrod runs off and retreats into himself. Lily follows him and attempts to cheer him up. Then she tells him she is going home the following day, but that it could change. At the bus stop, Jarrod is waiting for her with a bouquet of lilies. They reconcile and journey back on the bus together.

== Cast ==
- Jemaine Clement as Jarrod Lough
- Loren Horsley as Lily McKinnon
- Craig Hall as Doug Davis
- Joel Tobeck as Damon McKinnon
- Brian Sergent as Jonah
- Rachel House as Nancy
- David Fane as Eric
- Taika Waititi as Gordon
- Chelsie Preston Crayford as Jenny
- Gentiane Lupi as Tracy

== Production ==
Waititi wrote the screenplay based on the character of Lily developed by Loren Horsley. The film's script was workshopped at the Sundance Film Festival Director's and Screenwriter's Labs in June 2005.

The script was sold in August 2005 and given a budget of NZ$1.8 million (US$1.35 million). It was shot entirely in New Zealand, in and around Wellington City and Porirua, during 25 days in October and November 2005 with a crew of 35 workers.

The film is composed mostly of live action, but segments within the film are done in stop motion by Another Planet Ltd., utilising both props and actors.

== Soundtrack ==
The soundtrack to Eagle vs Shark features New Zealand artists the Phoenix Foundation, Age Pryor, the Reduction Agents, and Tessa Rain, along with M. Ward, Devendra Banhart and British group the Stone Roses. Along with a number of songs, the Phoenix Foundation wrote the original score for the film. The soundtrack is available through Hollywood Records and Apple's iTunes.

== Distribution ==
At Cannes 2006 it was announced that Miramax Films had purchased the North American theatrical rights after watching a five-minute trailer.

The creators of the film asked art website DeviantArt to hold a competition to come up with a poster for the film. The winning poster, by DeviantArt user 'puggdogg', was printed in The Onion newspaper.

== Critical reception ==
On Rotten Tomatoes it has a 56% rating based on reviews from 110 critics. The site's critical consensus states that while there were "frequent moments of wit and mordant humor, Eagle vs Shark needs more to distinguish itself from other precious, Napoleon Dynamite-ish comedies." On Metacritic the film has a rating of 55 out of 100 based on reviews from 25 critics, indicating "mixed or average reviews".

Joe Morgenstern of The Wall Street Journal commented that "...'Eagle vs Shark' has its own distinctive style, partly thanks to whimsical little interludes of animation, but mainly because it ties blithe absurdity to a rock bed of emotional truth." Jim Ridley of The Village Voice noted the dissimilarity to Napoleon Dynamite, saying that Napoleon "looks like Cary Grant next to the hero of this Kiwi quirk-a-thon: a hulking, sullen creep named Jarrod whose goony sulking, petulant selfishness and dweeby videogame obsession somehow work like Spanish fly on mousy burger-flipper Lily."

== Box office ==
Eagle vs Shark's worldwide gross is $US1,298,037. In the US, it opened on 15 June 2007 on three screens (one in New York City, two in Los Angeles) grossing $US20,361 in its opening weekend. This was preceded by a series of free screenings, some with a Q&A with Taika Waititi and Loren Horsley, in certain cities to gain a word-of-mouth buzz.

== Home media ==
Eagle vs Shark was released 8 January 2008 on DVD. Bonus features include a commentary by director Taika Waititi, outtakes, deleted scenes with optional commentary, and the Phoenix Foundation's music video for "Going Fishing".
