= Six Strings and a Sailboat =

Studio album by Jamie McDell
- Released: November 16, 2012
- Recorded: 2011–2012
- Studio: York Street Studios, Auckland, New Zealand; Wired Studios, Auckland, New Zealand
- Genre: Pop, acoustic
- Length: 47:34
- Label: EMI Music New Zealand
- Producer: Simon Gooding, Stephen Small

Jamie McDell chronology
All That I Wanted - Acoustic EP (2012)	Six Strings and a Sailboat (2012)	Ask Me Anything (2015)

Singles from Six Strings and a Sailboat
- 1. "You'll Never Take That Away" Released: 20 February 2012; 2. "Rewind" Released: 13 July 2012; 3. "Life in Sunshine" Released: 12 October 2012; 4. "Angel" Released: 1 February 2013

Six Strings and a Sailboat is the debut studio album by New Zealand singer-songwriter Jamie McDell. It was released 16 November 2012 and peaked at number 8 on the New Zealand Album Charts. An instrumental version of the album was released on 11 January 2013 on the iTunes Store.

== Singles ==
- "You'll Never Take That Away" was released 20 February 2010. It peaked at number 11 on the New Zealand singles chart.
- "Rewind" was released 18 July 2011. It peaked at number 30 on the New Zealand singles Chart.
- "Life in Sunshine" was released 12 October 2012. It peaked at number 27 on the New Zealand singles Chart.
- "Angel" was released 1 February 2013.

== Track listing ==
All tracks are written by Jamie McDell

No.	Title	Length
1.	"Life in Sunshine"	3:32
2.	"One Step Behind"	3:44
3.	"You'll Never Take That Away"	3:14
4.	"Danny's Song"	3:27
5.	"Angel"	3:34
6.	"Rewind"	3:30
7.	"Lie"	3:32
8.	"All I Need"	3:10
9.	"Stick With You"	3:47
10.	"Know My Heart"	3:58
11.	"Get Away"	3:52
12.	"Here to Stay"	4:02
13.	"Bring Me Home"	4:12

iTunes Bonus Tracks
No.	Title	Length
14.	"Gypsy Pirates" (Acoustic Version)	3:14
15.	"For the Sun" (Acoustic Version)	5:15
16.	"When It Rains" (Acoustic Version)	3:13

CD Bonus Tracks
No.	Title	Length
14.	"Gypsy Pirates" (Acoustic Version)	3:14
15.	"Carry Me" (Acoustic Version)	4:12
16.	"Grey Sky Blue" (Acoustic Version)	3:14

== Chart performance ==
=== Charts ===
Chart	Peak position
New Zealand	8
New Zealand Artist	2
