= Horsepower (album) =

Studio album by The Phoenix Foundation
- Released: 2003
- Length: 44:22
- Label: Capital Recordings; Young American
- Producer: Lee Prebble

The Phoenix Foundation chronology
Horsepower (2003)	Pegasus (2005)

Professional ratings
Review scores
Source	Rating
AllMusic	3.5/5 stars

Horsepower is an album by The Phoenix Foundation, released in 2003. It was re-released outside of New Zealand in 2007.

== Critical reception ==
PopMatters wrote that one of the band's "greatest strengths is a mastery of sonic nuance ... the arrangements are rich and colorful, but the texture never feels too thick." Illinois Times called the album's sound "a hypnotic, often melancholy brand of atmospheric alt-rock that combines beguiling vocal melodies with radiant guitars and eccentric production touches."

== Track listing ==
1. "Sister Risk" – 4:50
2. "Let Me Die A Woman" – 3:53
3. "This Charming Van" – 3:56
4. "The Swarm" – 2:42
5. "St Kevin" – 4:18
6. "Bruiser (Miami 4000)" – 4:15
7. "Sally" – 4:26
8. "Celebrate!" – 3:12
9. "Going Fishing" – 4:58
10. "Lambs" – 3:57
11. "Wildlife" – 4:01

Bonus Tracks:

1. "The Drinker" - 4: 57
2. "Blue Summer" - 3: 34
