= Ask Me Anything (album) =

Studio album by Jamie McDell
- Released: March 27, 2015
- Genre: Pop
- Label: Universal Music New Zealand

Jamie McDell chronology
Six Strings and a Sailboat (2012)	Ask Me Anything (2015)

Singles from Ask Me Anything
- 1. "Dumb" Released: 8 August 2014; 2. "Crash" Released: 1 January 2015; 3. "Back of My Mind (featuring Rai Thistlethwayte)" Released: 27 February 2015

Ask Me Anything is the second studio album by New Zealand singer-songwriter Jamie McDell. It was released 27 March 2015.

== Singles ==
- "Dumb" was released on 8 August 2014. It peaked at number 37 on the New Zealand singles chart.
- "Crash" was released on 1 January 2015. It was also released as an EP which included acoustic and instrumental versions of the track, as well as the song "Imagination".
- "Back of My Mind" was released on 27 February 2015. The song feature vocals and guitar by Rai Thistlethwayte. McDell and Thistlethwayte performed the song live on the Week 2 elimination episode of The X Factor NZ.

== Track listing ==
No.	Title	Writer(s)	Length
1.	"Falling"	Jamie McDell	3:49
2.	"Fly Honeys"		3:29
3.	"Dumb"	Mitchell Kenny; McDell; Esther Sparkes	3:20
4.	"Five Years from Now"	McDell	3:41
5.	"Back of My Mind" (featuring Rai Thistlethwayte)	Stuart Crichton; McDell; Rai Thistlethwayte	3:10
6.	"Story of John"		4:23
7.	"Moon Shines Red"	Crichton; McDell	4:11
8.	"Crash"	Crichton; McDell	3:16
9.	"Six Miles"	Crichton; McDell	4:27
10.	"Wicked Man"		4:34
11.	"My Old Hands"	Crichton; McDell	3:38
12.	"This Time"	Crichton; McDell	3:30
13.	"Luck"	K Mitchell; McDell	3:59

== Charts ==
Chart (2015)	Peak position
New Zealand Albums (RMNZ)	7
