= B.net =

- Predecessors: DCM d.o.o. and Adriatic kabel d.o.o.
- Founded: September 2007 in Zagreb, Croatia
- Headquarters: Vrtni put 1, Zagreb, Croatia
- Products: Digital cable Cable Internet; Phone service
- Parent: Vipnet (since 2011)
- Website: www.bnet.hr

B.net is a telecommunications company in Croatia, and has been a subsidiary of Vipnet since 2011. It provides cable television, phone and Internet in Osijek, Rijeka, Solin, Split, Velika Gorica, Zadar and Zagreb.

The company was formed in September 2007 as a merger of two major Croatian cable companies, DCM d.o.o. and Adriatic Kabel d.o.o. In 2010, the company had 105,000 cable television users, with a potential expansion to 250,000 households.

== Offered Television Channel Packages ==
=== Basic (analog) Package ===
The Basic (Analog) package is divided into five regions (Osijek, Rijeka, Split, Zadar and Zagreb), and some programs below are only available to a certain region.

HRT 1, HRT 2, Doma TV, Nova TV, RTL Television, RTL 2, TV Jadran, Jabuka TV, Mreža TV, Z1, Channel Ri, OSTV, Vinkovačka TV, Slavonia and Baranja Television, Channel A, Pink BH, OBN, Hallmark Channel, TV1000, Cinestar TV, TCM, Fox Crime, Fox Life, Zone Romantica, Zone Reality, National Geographic Channel, Viasat Explore, Viasat History, SK 1, Sport 1, Cartoon Network, Boomerang, Mini TV, VH1, Croatian Music Channel, CNN, Vecernji.hr, Info Channel, RAI 1, Ita 1, Canale 5, Federal Television, RTS 2

=== Expanded (digital) Package ===
The Expanded (Digital) Package is divided into five regions (Osijek, Rijeka, Split, Zadar and Zagreb), and like the Basic Package, some programs below are only available in specific regions.

Pro 7, 3 SAT, Nat Geo Wild, Sci Fi Channel, BBC Entertainment, Euronews, CNBC, Balkanika Music TV, Fashion TV, Arte, SK2, RAI Sport, Extreme Sports Channel, Federalna televizija, OBN, Slovenija 1, RTS Sat, RTCG, Hustler TV, Blue Hustler, Saborska TV, Kanal Ri, OSTV, Vinkovačka TV, RAI 2, RTL, RTL 2, TV Espana, TV 5 Monde, Tiji, Kupi TV.
