= You'll Never Take That Away =

Single by Jamie McDell

from the album Six Strings and a Sailboat
- Released: February 20, 2012
- Recorded: York Street Studio
- Genre: Pop
- Length: 3:09
- Label: EMI Music New Zealand
- Songwriter(s): Jamie McDell

Jamie McDell singles chronology
"You'll Never Take That Away" (2012)	"Rewind" (2012)

Music video
- "You'll Never Take That Away" on YouTube

"You'll Never Take That Away" is the debut single by New Zealand singer-songwriter Jamie McDell. It was released digitally as the lead single from her upcoming studio album on 20 February 2012. "You'll Never Take That Away" was McDell's first single to top the Top 20 New Zealand Singles chart, and was certified Gold on 28 May 2012.

== Background ==
"You'll Never Take That Away" was composed and written by McDell, and recorded at York Street Studio in Auckland. In an interview with New Zealand radio station, The Edge FM, McDell explained that the song is about enjoying life, happiness and not caring about what other people say or think about it.

I wrote ‘You'll Never Take That Away’ about appreciating the things I have in my life and the things I love to do. It's human nature to judge others and that can really get to some people. I'm guess I'm saying in this song that I chose not to care and be happy with my life no matter who tries to bring me down and hopefully the single can encourage that attitude. Besides, life is so much more fun when you're not worrying about what people think.

== Music video ==
The music video was released 4 March 2012 and features McDell at a beach location in New Zealand. She describes the video as "light and summery", serving as an introduction to her life and interests. The video focuses on McDell's love for the ocean and "showing what I get up to in the summertime".

== Chart performance ==
"You'll Never Take That Away" was successful on the Official New Zealand Top 40, entering and debuting on the chart at No. 27 on 2 April 2012. The single climbed to No. 11 and spent a total of ten weeks on the chart. The single also topped the Top 20 New Zealand Singles chart (which features singles by New Zealand artists) on 30 April 2012, holding the top position for four consecutive weeks. The single was certified Gold on 28 May 2012.

Singles chart (2012)	Peak position
New Zealand Top 40 Singles	11
Top 20 New Zealand Singles	1
