= Samuel Flynn Scott =

- Also known as: Samuel F. Scott & the B.O.P.
- Born: 19 December 1978 (age 46); Wellington, New Zealand
- Genres: Indie folk, Alternative country
- Instrument: guitar
- Years active: 1997–present

Samuel Flynn Scott (born 1978) is a New Zealand musician and composer, and a founding member of The Phoenix Foundation.

== Early life and career ==
Scott was born in Wellington, New Zealand in 1978. His father, Tom Scott, is a notable author and political cartoonist. Scott attended Wellington High School, where he founded The Phoenix Foundation with Luke Buda and Conrad Wedde in 1997.

== Solo music ==
In 2004, Scott formed a new band named Bunnies on Ponies, in order to try out some songs that didn't fit with the Phoenix Foundation sound. After performing a few live shows around his hometown of Wellington, he released his debut solo album, The Hunt Brings Us Life, in 2006. It was included in Amplifier Magazine's Top 20 Kiwi Albums of 2006.

His second solo album, Straight Answer Machine, was released under the name 'Samuel F. Scott & the B.O.P.' in 2008.

Scott has also worked as a composer for commercials and movies. Along with his Phoenix Foundation bandmate, Luke Buda, Scott composed the soundtrack for the 2009 New Zealand film, Separation City. He has been called "the best young songwriter in New Zealand today" by the Sunday Star Times.

== Discography ==
=== Albums ===
- The Hunt Brings Us Life (2006)
- Straight Answer Machine (2008)
- Heat Death of the Universe (2014)

=== Singles ===
- 'Raver on Probation' (2008)
- 'Baked' (2015)

=== Film Scores ===
- Eagle Vs Shark (2007)
- Separation City (2007)
- Boy (2010)
- Hunt For The Wilderpeople (2016)
- Beyond The Known World (2017)
- Meat (2017)
- This Town (2020)
- Night Raiders (2021)
