= Fandango (The Phoenix Foundation album) =

Studio album by The Phoenix Foundation
- Released: 26 April 2013 (NZ/AUS); 29 April 2013 (UK/EU); 14 May 2013 (USA)
- Genre: Indie rock, Neo-psychedelia, Indie pop
- Length: 76:55
- Label: Universal Music NZ
- Producer: The Phoenix Foundation

The Phoenix Foundation chronology
| Buffalo (2010) | Fandango (2013) | Give Up Your Dreams (2015) |

Fandango is the fifth full-length album by New Zealand band, The Phoenix Foundation. The first double-album by the band, it was released in Australasia on 26 April 2013, and in England soon after. Fandango's final track "Friendly Society" is one of their longest to date, running just under 18 minutes in length. In 2014 Fandango was a finalist for the 2014 Taite Music Prize.

== Release ==
The first single from Fandango was "The Captain", released in late January 2013, alongside an announcement that the album would be released at the end of April. The full album was made available for streaming on The Guardian two weeks before its release date.

== Track listing ==
All songs written and performed by The Phoenix Foundation.

=== Disc one ===
1. "Black Mould" – 5:30
2. "Modern Rock" – 6:12
3. "The Captain" – 3:38
4. "Thames Soup" – 5:07
5. "Evolution Did" – 3:48
6. "Inside Me Dead" – 5:56
7. "Corale" – 7:39

=== Disc two ===
1. "Supernatural" – 6:08
2. "Walls" – 3:45
3. "Morning Riff" – 4:33
4. "Sideways Glance" – 6:58
5. "Friendly Society" – 17:41

== Personnel ==
- Luke Buda
- Tom Callwood
- Chris O'Connor
- Will Ricketts
- Samuel Scott
- Conrad Wedde

Additional Personnel

- Richie Singleton
- James Milne
- Neil Finn
- Holly Beals
- Lucien Johnson
- Lee Prebble
