= Age Pryor =

New Zealand musician and songwriter

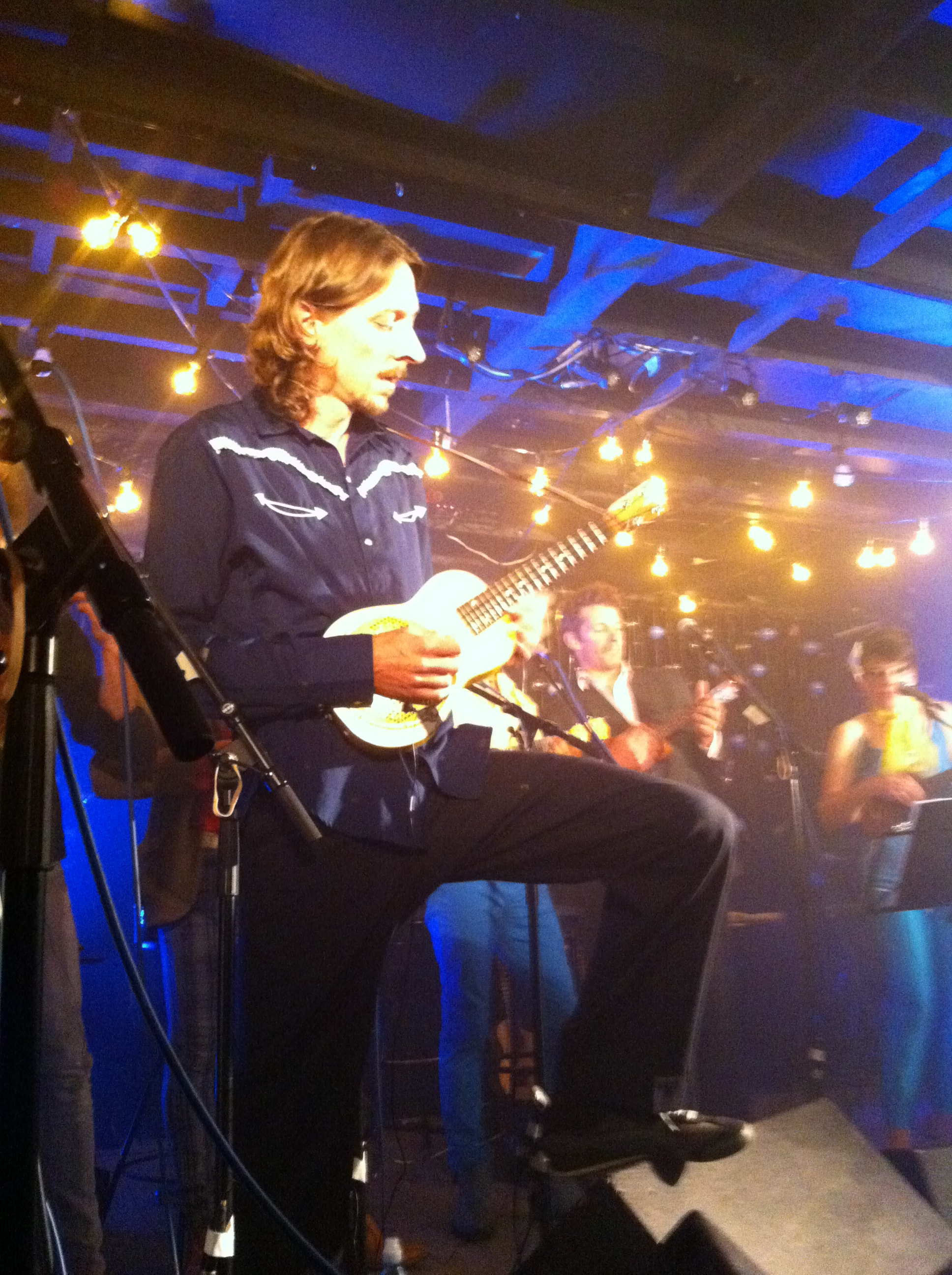
- Age Pryor performing with the Wellington International Ukulele Orchestra in Wellington 2011.

Background information
- Born: 1976 (age 49–50)

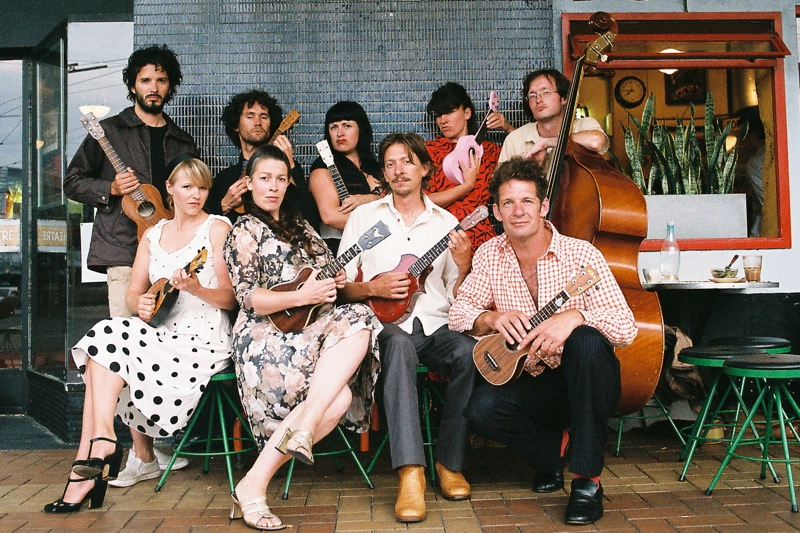
Wellington International Ukulele Orchestra (2008)

Age Pryor is a New Zealand musician and songwriter. He records and performs solo, he plays many instruments and is a founding member of the Wellington International Ukulele Orchestra, The Woolshed Sessions, and Congress of Animals, and is also a contributing artist to the group Fly My Pretties.

Pryor had his songs played on b.net.

Pryor contributed two songs to the Miramax feature film Eagle Versus Shark. The film was written and directed by Taika Waititi, who also directed the video for the title song off the 'Shanks' Pony' album.

He has also been part of the live band that features on the Flight of the Conchords including the first recording, Folk The World Tour, in 2002.

== Discography ==
=== Solo albums ===
- homerecordings - Age Pryor & Tessa Rain, 2001, own label (CD)
- City Chorus - Age Pryor, 2003, own label (CD)
- Shanks' Pony - Age Pryor, 2007, own label (CD)
- Invisible Lines - Age Pryor, 2021, own label (CD)

=== Ensemble Albums ===
- Fly My Pretties: Live At Bats - Fly My Pretties, Loop, 2004
- Fly My Pretties: The Return - Fly My Pretties, Loop, 2005
- Fly My Pretties: IV - Fly My Pretties, Loop, 2012
- The Woolshed Sessions - The Woolshed Sessions, 2008, own label
- The Heartache EP - The Wellington International Ukulele Orchestra, 2007, own label (CD)
- The Little Bit Wonderful EP - The Wellington International Ukulele Orchestra, 2008, own label (CD)
- The Dreaming EP - The Wellington International Ukulele Orchestra, 2009, own label (CD)
- I Love You EP - The Wellington International Ukulele Orchestra, 2011, own label (CD)
- Be Mine Tonight - The Wellington International Ukulele Orchestra, 2014, own label (CD)
- Congress of Animals - Congress of Animals, 2018, own label
