= Tough as Nails season 3 =

American reality-TV show season

Tough as Nails
- Season 3
- Hosted by: Phil Keoghan
- No. of contestants: 12
- Winner: Lia Mort
- Runner-up: Dequincey "Quincey" Walker
- No. of episodes: 10

Release
- Original network: CBS
- Original release: October 6 – December 8, 2021

Season chronology
- ← Previous; Season 2 Next → Season 4

The third season of the American television series Tough as Nails premiered on CBS on October 6, 2021, and concluded on December 8, 2021. The season was won by jill-of-all-trades Lia Mort, with diesel mechanic Dequincey "Quincey" Walker finishing second, and heavy equipment operator Jerome Kupuka'a placing third.

== Cast ==
Contestant	Job	Age	Hometown	Team	Money Earned	Result
Lia Mort	Jill-of-all-trades	54	Lititz, Pennsylvania	Dirty Hands	$220,000	Winner
Dequincey "Quincey" Walker	Diesel mechanic	34	Lamar, South Carolina	Dirty Hands	$20,000	Runner-up
Jerome Kupuka'a	Heavy equipment operator	48	ʻEwa Beach, Hawaii	Dirty Hands	$20,000	Third place
Elizabeth Rillera	Contractor	37	Shelton, Washington	Savage Crew	$8,000	Punched out ninth
Mike Shaffer	Lineman	32	Brewerton, New York	Savage Crew	$8,000	Punched out eighth
Takeru "Tak" Tanabe	Construction foreman	35	Kailua-Kona, Hawaii	Dirty Hands	$20,000	Punched out seventh
Alfredo "Alfie" P. Rivera	Construction supervisor	55	Santiago, Chile	Savage Crew	$8,000	Punched out sixth
Christine Connors	Ironworker	29	Johnstown, Pennsylvania	Dirty Hands	$20,000	Punched out fifth
Kelsy Reynolds	Crop duster	30	Mansfield, Illinois	Savage Crew	$8,000	Punched out fourth
Sarah Ham	Cement mason	30	Queens, New York	Savage Crew	$8,000	Punched out third
Lamar Edwin Hanger	Carpenter	54	Orange County, California	Savage Crew	$8,000	Punched out second
Kalimba Edwards	Fire captain	43	Wallace, Nebraska	Dirty Hands	$20,000	Punched out first

=== Future appearances ===
Dequincey "Quincey" Walker appeared on the fourth season during the automotive service challenges of the fourth episode. Lamar Edwin Hanger appeared on the fourth season during the construction challenges of the seventh episode. Lia Mort appeared in the fifth season during the apple-loading challenge in the fifth episode.

== Cast progress ==
Contestant	2	3	4	5	6	7	8	9	10	
Lia	SAFE	SAFE	BTM2	HIGH	WIN	HIGH	HIGH	BTM2	WIN	WINNER
Quincey	HIGH	SAFE	SAFE	SAFE	BTM2	BTM2	BTM2	LOW	BTM2	RUNNER-UP
Jerome	SAFE	SAFE	SAFE	WIN	SAFE	SAFE	SAFE	HIGH	WIN	THIRD
Elizabeth	SAFE	SAFE	SAFE	LOW	LOW	SAFE	WIN	WIN	ELIM	
Mike	SAFE	HIGH	WIN	SAFE	HIGH	WIN	LOW	ELIM		
Tak	LOW	WIN	HIGH	SAFE	SAFE	LOW	ELIM			
Alfie	SAFE	SAFE	LOW	SAFE	SAFE	ELIM				
Christine	SAFE	BTM2	LOW	BTM2	ELIM					
Kelsy	BTM2	SAFE	SAFE	ELIM						
Sarah	LOW	LOW	ELIM							
Hanger	WIN	ELIM								
Kalimba	ELIM									

The contestant won Tough as Nails.
The contestant was declared the first runner-up.
The contestant was declared the second runner-up.
The contestant placed the highest in the individual competition and won the challenge.
The contestant placed the second highest in the individual competition and was ultimately declared safe.
The contestant was safe from elimination.
The contestant placed the second lowest in the individual competition but was ultimately declared safe.
The contestant placed the lowest in the individual competition and competed in the overtime challenge but ultimately survived.
The contestant was the loser of the overtime challenge and was eliminated from the individual competition.

== Team progress ==
Team	Money Earned	1	2	3	4	5	6	7	8	9
Dirty Hands	$120,000	LOSS	WIN	LOSS	WIN	WIN	WIN	LOSS	WIN	LOSS
Savage Crew	$48,000	WIN	LOSS	WIN	LOSS	LOSS	LOSS	WIN	LOSS	WIN

Won the team challenge.
Lost the team challenge.

== Production ==
On April 14, 2021, CBS announced that Tough as Nails was renewed for a third and a fourth season. On June 7, Phil Keoghan revealed on the show's social media that filming had begun at Marine Corps Base Camp Pendleton. The contestants also competed at Mount Baldy, the United States Coast Guard Base in San Pedro, and the Irwindale Speedway. On July 12, 2021, it was announced that the season would premiere on October 6, 2021.

== Episodes ==
No. overall	No. in season	Title	Original release date	Prod. code	U.S. viewers (millions)
21	1	"Ready for Battle"	October 6, 2021	TAN301	3.11
Individual Challenge: Contestants had to unwrap an airdrop that was dropped onto Marine Corps Base Camp Pendleton from a Lockheed C-130 Hercules, assemble a trailer, load all of the supplies onto the trailer, then use an ATV to tow the trailer across a finish line to Phil Keoghan and Tough as Nails season one champion Kelly "Murph" Murphy. The first two to finish would win the ability to choose the teams, with the overall winner picking first.: Winners: Lia, Mike; Team Challenge: Teams had to set up a concertina wire fence, set up a 305 tent, transfer supplies onto four pallets, change the tires on a Humvee, then raise an American flag to signal a Humvee driver to drive out of the enclosure. The first team to do so would win the challenge.: Winners: Savage Crew
22	2	"Fight Tooth and Nail"	October 13, 2021	TAN302	2.93
Team Challenge: Teams had to replace the wooden slats on six ski lift chairs and install them onto the cable of the Mount Baldy Ski Lifts. The first team to do so would win the challenge.: Winners: Dirty Hands; Individual Challenge: Contestants had to assemble a section of snow fence and saw the planks of the old fence in half. The challenge was performed in two heats. The overall fastest contestant would win a power tool prize package and the last to finish each heat would face potential elimination in the Overtime challenge.: Winner: Hanger; Bottom Two: Kelsy, Kalimba; Overtime Challenge: Contestants had to replace nine clogged nozzles on two snowmaking machines. The first contestant to finish would be safe and the other would be eliminated from the individual competition.: Eliminated: Kalimba
23	3	"It's a Bird, It's a Plane, It's a Freight Train"	October 20, 2021	TAN303	2.75
Team Challenge: Teams had to deliver a truckload of office supplies to four rooms in a building. After furnishing a room, teams had to get the office manager to sign a manifest. The first team to finish would win the challenge.: Winners: Savage Crew; Individual Challenge: Contestants had to ride in a delivery truck that was being driven by Tough as Nails season two contestant Patrick "Freight Train" Hargan and deliver twelve packages to seven houses. The contestant with the fastest time would win a care package from home, and the two contestants with the slowest times would face potential elimination in the Overtime challenge.: Winner: Tak; Bottom Two: Hanger, Christine; Overtime Challenge: Contestants had to scan the QR codes on packages to sort them into standard and overnight delivery. They then had to load the 30 overnight packages into a truck. The first contestant to finish would be safe and the other would be eliminated from the individual competition.: Eliminated: Hanger
24	4	"Facing Fear"	October 27, 2021	TAN304	2.82
Team Challenge: Teams had to replace the navigational light and chains on two buoys. The first team to finish would win the challenge.: Winners: Dirty Hands; Individual Challenge: Contestants had to don an immersion suit, swim out to retrieve a floating training dummy called an OSCAR, which matched their weight, and return it to the dock. The challenge was performed in two heats. The overall fastest contestant would win a fishing trip and the last to finish each heat would face potential elimination in the Overtime challenge.: Winner: Mike; Bottom Two: Lia, Sarah; Overtime Challenge: Contestants had to use a line and grapple to pull three buoys and anchors onto the USCGC George Cobb and place each one into a locker box. The first contestant to finish would be safe and the other would be eliminated from the individual competition.: Eliminated: Sarah
25	5	"Pressure Don't Scare Me"	November 3, 2021	TAN305	2.64
Team Challenge: Teams had to complete an auto racing pit stop at the Irwindale Speedway by changing a race car's tires and refueling the car. Teams had three attempts, and the team with the fastest time would win the challenge.: Winners: Dirty Hands; Individual Challenge: Contestants had to search through a pile of 600 car tires for four with the same number, mount them onto wheels, and pressurize them. The winner would drive a victory lap around the Irwindale Speedway, and the last two contestants to finish would face potential elimination in the Overtime challenge.: Winner: Jerome; Bottom Two: Christine, Kelsy; Overtime Challenge: Contestants had to use a zoom boom lift to raise themselves 11 stories and replace a blown lightbulb. The first contestant to return to the ground would be safe and the other would be eliminated from the individual competition.: Eliminated: Kelsy
26	6	"Mud and Mayhem"	November 10, 2021	TAN306	2.79
Team Challenge: Teams had to move two irrigation lines (32 pipes) from one of Cinagro Farms' fields to another. The first team to finish would win the challenge.: Winners: Dirty Hands; Individual Challenge: Contestants had to harvest two 60-foot rows of cilantro with a hand sickle, wrap cilantro bundles with wire, and load the cilantro onto a trailer. The winner would receive a year's supply of fresh produce, and the last two contestants to finish would face potential elimination in the Overtime challenge.: Winner: Lia; Bottom Two: Christine, Quincey; Overtime Challenge: Contestants had to drive a tractor with a disc harrow to harrow the weeds in a plot. The first contestant to finish would be safe and the other would be eliminated from the individual competition.: Eliminated: Christine
27	7	"Mic Drop"	November 17, 2021	TAN307	2.80
Team Challenge: Teams had to assemble a lighting grid at The Wiltern. The first team to finish would win the challenge.: Winners: Savage Crew; Individual Challenge: Contestants had to set up a DJ station so that it matched an example. The winner would receive a pair of tickets to the 64th Annual Grammy Awards, and the last two contestants to finish would face potential elimination in the Overtime challenge.: Winner: Mike; Bottom Two: Alfie, Quincey; Overtime Challenge: Contestants had to place letters on the theater marquee to form the phrase "TOUGH AS NAILS TIME TO GET TO WORK". The first contestant to finish would be safe and the other would be eliminated from the individual competition.: Eliminated: Alfie
28	8	"Battle Lines"	November 24, 2021	TAN308	3.06
Team Challenge: Teams had to reseal a section of parking lot at Dignity Health Sports Park. They had to remove cars using a tow truck, clean debris, and fill in cracks before covering their section with a layer of sealant. The first team to finish would win the challenge.: Winners: Dirty Hands; Individual Challenge: Contestants had to hand-paint ten parking spots, which included two ADA parking spots, and install a car stop in the ADA parking spots. The winner would win a deluxe barbecue, and the last two contestants to finish would face potential elimination in the Overtime challenge.: Winner: Elizabeth; Bottom Two: Quincey, Tak; Overtime Challenge: Contestants had to drive a Ford F150 out of a valet parking lot by moving the surrounding twenty cars one at a time in the lot to one of four available spots. The first contestant to finish would be safe and the other would be eliminated from the individual competition.: Eliminated: Tak
29	9	"Bull In a China Shop"	December 1, 2021	TAN309	2.84
Team Challenge: Teams had to nominate one team member to compete in one of three tasks: breaking up a concrete block and loading chunks into a bin to tip a scale, using a grinder to cut a seven-inch diameter pipe, and unwrapping a 50-foot chain off a bike. Teams would earn a stake after winning a challenge, and after three rounds the chosen contestants had to complete all three tasks to win two stakes. The first team to earn five stakes would win the challenge.: Winners: Savage Crew; Individual Challenge: Contestants had to repair ten pallets by removing and replacing the damaged wood. The winner would win a 566-piece mechanics tools kit, and the last two contestants to finish would face potential elimination in the Overtime challenge.: Winner: Elizabeth; Bottom Two: Mike, Lia; Overtime Challenge: Contestants had to build a rocking chair, which included hand-making the dowels. The first contestant to finish would be safe and the other would be eliminated from the individual competition.: Eliminated: Mike
30	10	"Dreams Never Die"	December 8, 2021	TAN310	2.89
Individual Challenge: Contestants had to drive a skid-steer loader to make a ramp of gravel over a K-rail and then drive through a stack of barrels. The challenge was performed in two heats. The last to finish each heat would face potential elimination in the Overtime challenge.: Bottom Two: Quincey, Elizabeth; Overtime Challenge: Contestants had to assemble a backflow prevention device. The first contestant to finish would be safe and the other would be eliminated from the individual competition.: Eliminated: Elizabeth; Final Challenge: Contestants had to race through a gauntlet of obstacles based on previous challenges on the season, having to smash a wall with a sledgehammer, stack 30 pallets to form steps, untie and drag a dummy up a slope, undo four tires and attach them to a container to make stairs, cut three pieces of metal with a grinder to make six steps, drive in two stakes with a sledgehammer, and raise a rope ladder in order to reach the Ford truck at the finish line. The first contestant to make it through to the end would be declared the Tough as Nails Champion.: Winner: Lia; As the winner of the final challenge, Lia became the Tough as Nails Champion, winning the $200,000 individual prize and a 2022 Ford Super Duty truck.
