= Tough as Nails season 4 =

American reality-TV show season

Tough as Nails
- Season 4
- Hosted by: Phil Keoghan
- No. of contestants: 12
- Winner: Jorge Zavala
- Runner-up: Mister Frost
- No. of episodes: 10

Release
- Original network: CBS
- Original release: January 4 – February 22, 2023

Season chronology
- ← Previous; Season 3 Next → Season 5

The fourth season of the American television series Tough as Nails premiered on CBS on January 4, 2023, and concluded on February 22, 2023. The season was won by concrete form setter Jorge Zavala, with welder Mister Frost finishing second, and pipeline laborer Jake Cope placing third.

== Cast ==
Contestant	Job	Age	Hometown	Team	Money Earned	Result
Jorge Zavala	Concrete form setter	25	Ontario, California	Dirty Hands	$223,000	Winner
Mister Frost	Welder	36	Spencer, Oklahoma	Savage Crew	$39,000	Runner-up
Jake Cope	Pipeline laborer	34	Little Meadows, Pennsylvania	Savage Crew	$29,000	Third place
Larron Ables	Diesel technician	22	Austin, Texas	Savage Crew	$28,000	Punched out ninth
Ellery Liburd	Firefighter	54	Bronx, New York	Dirty Hands	$8,000	Punched out eighth
Ilima Shim	Construction worker	34	Waianae, Hawaii	Savage Crew	$23,000	Punched out seventh
Laura Bernotas	General contractor	35	Norfolk, Virginia	Savage Crew	$20,000	Punched out sixth
Beth Salva-Clifford	Shipboard electrician	42	Norfolk, Virginia	Dirty Hands	$8,000	Punched out fifth
Sergio Robles	Foreman	51	Huntington Beach, California	Dirty Hands	$20,000	Punched out fourth
Aly Bala	Laborer	25	Covington, Georgia	Dirty Hands	$8,000	Punched out third
Renèe Kolar	Dry mason	52	Marshfield, Massachusetts	Savage Crew	$20,000	Punched out second
Synethia Bland	Carpenter	38	Roselle, New Jersey	Dirty Hands	$8,000	Punched out first

== Cast progress ==
Contestant	2	3	4	5	6	7	8	9	10	
Jorge	SAFE	WIN	SAFE	WIN	BTM2	WIN	LOW	SAFE	BTM2	WINNER
Mister	SAFE	BTM2	SAFE	SAFE	HIGH	SAFE	BTM2	WIN	WIN	RUNNER-UP
Jake	WIN	SAFE	LOW	BTM2	WIN	LOW	WIN	BTM2	WIN	THIRD
Larron	LOW	SAFE	WIN	LOW	LOW	BTM2	WIN	LOW	ELIM	
Ellery	BTM2	SAFE	SAFE	HIGH	HIGH	HIGH	LOW	ELIM		
Ilima	SAFE	LOW	BTM2	SAFE	WIN	SAFE	ELIM			
Laura	SAFE	SAFE	SAFE	SAFE	LOW	ELIM				
Beth	SAFE	SAFE	SAFE	SAFE	ELIM					
Sergio	HIGH	SAFE	HIGH	ELIM						
Aly	SAFE	HIGH	ELIM							
Renèe	SAFE	ELIM								
Synethia	ELIM									

The contestant won Tough as Nails.
The contestant was declared the first runner-up.
The contestant was declared the second runner-up.
The contestant placed the highest in the individual competition and won the challenge.
The contestant placed the second highest in the individual competition and was ultimately declared safe.
The contestant was safe from elimination.
The contestant placed the second lowest in the individual competition but was ultimately declared safe.
The contestant placed the lowest in the individual competition and competed in the overtime challenge but ultimately survived.
The contestant was the loser of the overtime challenge and was eliminated from the individual competition.

== Team progress ==
Team	Money Earned	1	2	3	4	5	6	7	8	9
Dirty Hands	$48,000	LOSS	WIN	LOSS	WIN	WIN	LOSS	LOSS	LOSS	WIN
Savage Crew	$120,000	WIN	LOSS	WIN	LOSS	LOSS	WIN	WIN	WIN	LOSS

Won the team challenge.
Lost the team challenge.

== Production ==
On April 14, 2021, CBS announced that Tough as Nails was renewed for a third and a fourth season. The fourth season was filmed during November 2021. On November 14, 2022, it was announced that the season would premiere on January 4, 2023. The first episode of the season took place on Catalina Island.

== Episodes ==
No. overall	No. in season	Title	Original release date	Prod. code	U.S. viewers (millions)
31	1	"Welcome to Catalina Island"	January 4, 2023	TAN401	2.15
Individual Challenge: Contestants had to inflate a dinghy and replace an old boot mooring system. The first two to finish won the ability to choose the teams, with the overall winner picking first.: Winners: Sergio, Mister; Team Challenge: Teams had to drive a pickup truck across Catalina Island, load supplies into the truck bed, and rebuild an outdoor shade structure. The first team to finish won the challenge.: Winners: Savage Crew
32	2	"Perfect Symphony"	January 4, 2023	TAN402	2.15
Team Challenge: Teams had to correctly make a concrete slab. The first team to finish won the challenge.: Winners: Dirty Hands; Individual Challenge: Contestants had to build a section of retaining wall. The first contestant to finish won $2,000. The last two contestants to finish faced potential elimination in the Overtime challenge.: Winner: Jake; Bottom Two: Ellery, Synethia; Overtime Challenge: Contestants had to forge a helmet hook. The first contestant to finish was safe and the other was eliminated from the individual competition.: Eliminated: Synethia
33	3	"I Look Like Curious George"	January 11, 2023	TAN403	1.91
Team Challenge: Teams had to search Devil Mountain Nursery for 40 trees listed on a work order and load them onto a flatbed truck. The first team to finish won the challenge.: Winners: Savage Crew; Individual Challenge: Contestants had to build a planter box and replant a magnolia tree. The first contestant to finish won $3,000. The last two contestants to finish faced potential elimination in the Overtime challenge.: Winner: Jorge; Bottom Two: Mister, Renèe; Overtime Challenge: Contestants had to identify and repot 24 plants. The first contestant to finish was safe and the other was eliminated from the individual competition.: Eliminated: Renèe
34	4	"That's a Safety Hazard"	January 18, 2023	TAN404	1.82
Team Challenge: Teams had to complete specified maintenance on four vehicles, which included changing oil, rotating tires, replacing brake pads and the battery, installing nerf bars and shock absorbers, and replacing a car horn fuse. The first team to finish won the challenge.: Winners: Dirty Hands; Individual Challenge: Contestants had to reassemble a V8 engine. The first contestant to finish won $4,000. The last two contestants to finish faced potential elimination in the Overtime challenge.: Winner: Larron; Bottom Two: Aly, Ilima; Overtime Challenge: Contestants had to plug the holes on two pickup truck tires. The first contestant to finish was safe and the other was eliminated from the individual competition.: Eliminated: Aly
35	5	"Crush It!"	January 25, 2023	TAN405	2.15
Team Challenge: Teams had to pull a 16,000-pound fishing net onto a squid boat and properly lay it. Teams then had to load fishing net components onto a trailer. The first team to finish won the challenge.: Winners: Dirty Hands; Individual Challenge: Contestants had to crush three times their body weight in ice. The first contestant to finish won $5,000. The last two contestants to finish faced potential elimination in the Overtime challenge.: Winner: Jorge; Bottom Two: Jake, Sergio; Overtime Challenge: Contestants had to assemble 25 boxes and pack 40 pounds of squid in each box. The first contestant to finish was safe and the other was eliminated from the individual competition.: Eliminated: Sergio
36	6	"Rise and Grind"	February 1, 2023	TAN406	1.89
Team Challenge: Teams had to cut out seven panels on two shipping containers using grinders. The first team to finish won the challenge.: Winners: Savage Crew; Individual Challenge: Contestants were paired up into teams of two and tasked with shrink-wrapping a container house. The first pair of contestants to finish won $6,000. As the winner of the last individual challenge, Jorge earned the power to assign each of the teams. The pairs selected for the challenge were Jorge & Beth, Ellery & Mister, Larron & Laura, and Jake & Ilima. The last pair of contestants to finish faced potential elimination in the Overtime challenge.: Winners: Jake, Ilima; Bottom Two: Jorge, Beth; Overtime Challenge: Contestants had to install 29 feet of copper piping so that water could flow and fill a glass of water, which had to be delivered to Phil Keoghan. The first contestant to finish was safe and the other was eliminated from the individual competition.: Eliminated: Beth
37	7	"Skills to Pay the Bills"	February 8, 2023	TAN407	1.93
Team Challenge: Teams had to assemble two levels of scaffolding and then hang their team banner. The first team to finish won the challenge.: Winners: Savage Crew; Individual Challenge: Contestants had to assemble a Perry Scaffold and install 72 ceiling tiles. The first contestant to finish won $7,000. The last two contestants to finish faced potential elimination in the Overtime challenge.: Winner: Jorge; Bottom Two: Larron, Laura; Overtime Challenge: Contestants had to hammer in the rungs of a 30-foot ladder, climb to the top, and ring a bell. The first contestant to finish was safe and the other was eliminated from the individual competition.: Eliminated: Laura
38	8	"Pressure Is On"	February 15, 2023	TAN408	1.80
Team Challenge: Teams had to remove litter from an alleyway, load the litter into the correct vehicles, and then hose down the alleyway. The first team to finish won the challenge.: Winners: Savage Crew; Individual Challenge: In pairs of two, contestants had to fix a water main leak using a full circle clamp and then use a Mueller device to tap the water main. The first pair of contestants to finish won $8,000. The contestants were able to pick their partners themselves, with the pairs being Ilima & Mister, Jake & Larron, and Jorge & Ellery. The last pair of contestants to finish faced potential elimination in the Overtime challenge.: Winner: Jake, Larron; Bottom Two: Ilima, Mister; Overtime Challenge: Contestants had to find and recover five items from a sewer: a key, a cellphone, glasses, a hammer, and a toy alligator (as a reference to the sewer alligator urban legend). The first contestant to finish was safe and the other was eliminated from the individual competition.: Eliminated: Ilima
39	9	"This Is Not a Sprint, It's a Marathon"	February 22, 2023	TAN409	2.09
Team Challenge: Teams had to complete a series of drills inspired by the trades, with the winner getting a stake, with the fourth one worth two. The team with five stakes wins the team challenge. Everyone had to go at least once before they go again.: Winners: Dirty Hands; Individual Challenge: Contestants had to drive a scissor lift and install HVAC ducting. The first contestant to finish won $9,000. The last two contestants faced potential elimination in the Overtime challenge.: Winner: Mister; Bottom Two: Jake, Ellery; Overtime Challenge: Contestants had to curve aluminum poles and build a table. The first contestant to finish was safe and the other was eliminated from the individual competition.: Eliminated: Ellery
40	10	"Keep Battling 'til the End"	February 22, 2023	TAN410	2.09
Individual Challenge: Contestants have to use an excavator to pick a steel ball and place them on a vertical pipe, get out of their excavator, run to a pile of concrete bags, load 10 bags on a pallet, they go back and forth, with the second one being 15 bags, and the last being 20 bags. Winners of the two heats move on to the final challenge. Losers will be sent to elimination. The contestant with the fastest time won $10,000. The pairs were Mister versus Larron, and Jake versus Jorge.: Winner: Mister; Bottom Two: Jorge, Larron; Overtime Challenge: Contestants used to a jackhammer to extract three stakes from concrete. The first contestant to finish was safe and the other was eliminated from the individual competition.: Eliminated: Larron; Final Challenge: Contestants ran an obstacle course based on their journey on Tough as Nails.: Winner: Jorge; As the winner of the final challenge, Jorge became the Tough as Nails Champion, winning the $200,000 individual prize and a Ford Super Duty truck.
