= Tough as Nails season 2 =

American reality-TV show season

Tough as Nails
- Season 2
- Hosted by: Phil Keoghan
- No. of contestants: 12
- Winner: Scott Henry
- Runner-up: Cyril "Zeus" Ontai III
- No. of episodes: 10

Release
- Original network: CBS
- Original release: February 10 – April 14, 2021

Season chronology
- ← Previous; Season 1 Next → Season 3

The second season of the American television series Tough as Nails premiered on CBS on February 10, 2021, and concluded on April 14, 2021. The season was won by construction superintendent Scott Henry, with lineman Cyril "Zeus" Ontai III finishing second, and pipe welder Sarah Burkett placing third.

== Cast ==
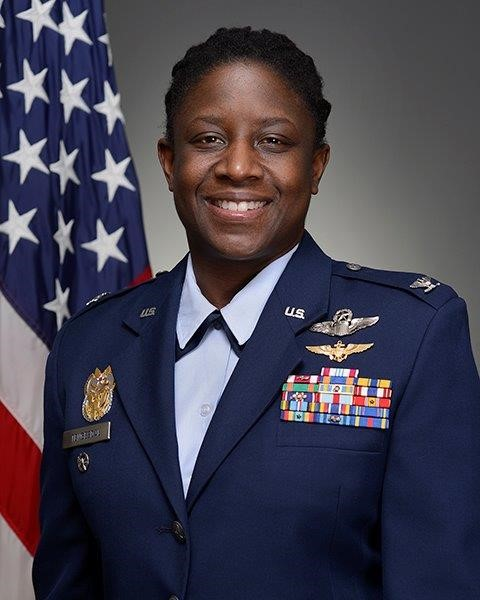
Merryl Tengesdal

Contestant	Job	Age	Hometown	Team	Money Earned	Result
Scott Henry	Construction superintendent	40	Orem, Utah	Savage Crew	$223,600	Winner
Cyril "Zeus" Ontai III	Lineman	29	Honolulu, Hawaii	Dirty Hands	$9,200	Runner-up
Sarah Burkett	Pipe welder	41	Chesterfield, Virginia	Savage Crew	$23,600	Third place
Swifty Sanders	Steelworker	43	East Chicago, Indiana	Savage Crew	$23,600	Punched out eighth
Iraida Mujica	Transport track repair	43	Miramar, Florida	Dirty Hands	$9,200	Punched out seventh
Liz "Knuckles" Nichols	Cement mason	36	Waltham, Massachusetts	Dirty Hands	$9,200	Punched out sixth
Merryl Tengesdal	Retired Air Force colonel	49	The Bronx, New York	Savage Crew	$23,600	Punched out fifth
Patrick "Freight Train" Hargan	UPS delivery driver	49	East Greenville, Pennsylvania	Dirty Hands	$9,200	Punched out fourth (Note: After receiving medical attention during the individual challenge of episode six, Iraida, his teammate for that challenge, punched Patrick out of the individual competition. While he was okay, as Patrick left the show's COVID-19 exclusion bubble to receive medical attention, he had to wait out a quarantine period before he could participate in the team competition. Since Patrick was medically cleared to continue, he was still eligible to win money from the team competitions despite not being able to compete in them.)
Aracelis "Celi" Garcia	Travel nurse	31	Lancaster, Pennsylvania	Savage Crew	$23,600	Punched out third
Angel Castillo	Construction foreman	29	Miami, Florida	Dirty Hands	$9,200	Punched out second
Michael "Eyebrows" Guerriero	Bricklayer	43	Queens, New York	Savage Crew	$2,000	Disqualified (Note: Before episode three, Michael left the show for an unspecified reason and did not continue in the individual or team competition. Phil Keoghan later stated on Rob Has a Podcast that Michael had broken a rule off-camera and had been removed from the show.)
Tara Alverson	Mariner	38	Bothell, Washington	Dirty Hands	$2,000	Punched out first (Note: After Tara punched out in episode two, she was not cleared by medical to continue in the team competition.)

=== Future appearances ===
Patrick "Freight Train" Hargan appeared on the third season during a package delivery challenge in the third episode. Outside of Tough as Nails, Scott Henry competed on the sixth season of The Floor.

== Cast progress ==
Contestant	2	3	4	5	6 (Note: Due to Patrick needing medical attention, the individual challenge was ended before any team won and no overtime competition was held.)	7	8	9	10	
Scott	WIN	WIN	SAFE	WIN	SAFE	HIGH	HIGH	HIGH	WIN	WINNER
Cyril	SAFE	SAFE	WIN	HIGH	SAFE	WIN	SAFE	LOW	BTM2	RUNNER-UP
Sarah	SAFE	SAFE	SAFE	SAFE	SAFE	LOW	WIN	WIN	WIN	THIRD
Swifty	BTM2	SAFE	HIGH	SAFE	SAFE	SAFE	LOW	BTM2	ELIM	
Iraida	SAFE	SAFE	WIN	LOW	SAFE	BTM2	BTM2	ELIM		
Liz	HIGH	BTM2	LOW	BTM2	SAFE	SAFE	ELIM			
Merryl	SAFE	SAFE	HIGH	SAFE	SAFE	ELIM				
Patrick	LOW	HIGH	BTM2	SAFE	ELIM					
Aracelis	SAFE	LOW	LOW	ELIM						
Angel	SAFE	BTM2	ELIM							
Michael	SAFE	DISQ								
Tara	ELIM									

The contestant won Tough as Nails.
The contestant was declared the first runner-up.
The contestant was declared the second runner-up.
The contestant placed the highest in the individual competition and won the challenge.
The contestant placed the second highest in the individual competition and was ultimately declared safe.
The contestant was safe from elimination.
The contestant placed the second lowest in the individual competition but was ultimately declared safe.
The contestant placed the lowest in the individual competition and competed in the overtime challenge but ultimately survived.
The contestant was the loser of the overtime challenge and was eliminated from the individual competition.
The contestant was disqualified from the competition due to breaking the show's rules.

== Team progress ==
Team	Money Earned	1	2	3 (Note: After Tara and Michael left the competition, five contestants were left on each team - the prize money per challenge remained at $12,000, with each of the five players receiving $2,400 per team challenge win.)	4	5	6	7	8	Tiebreaker
Dirty Hands	$48,000	LOSS	WIN	LOSS	WIN	WIN	LOSS	WIN	LOSS	LOSS
Savage Crew	$120,000	WIN	LOSS	WIN	LOSS	LOSS	WIN	LOSS	WIN	WIN

Won the team challenge.
Lost the team challenge.

== Production ==
On August 12, 2020, CBS announced the series was renewed for a second season. Filming took place during fall 2020 with COVID-19 protocols being adopted. On December 8, 2020, it was announced that the season would premiere on February 10, 2021.

== Episodes ==
No. overall	No. in season	Title	Original release date	Prod. code	U.S. viewers (millions)
11	1	"Just Another Day On the Job"	February 10, 2021	TAN201	3.49
Individual Challenge: Contestants had to break pieces of concrete up into aggregate and sift it into a provided container. After getting the container to a specified weight, they were tasked with mixing enough raw material to fill a wooden frame with concrete. The first two to finish would win the ability to choose the teams, with the overall winner picking first.: Winners: Michael, Liz; As the winner, Michael was also able to choose which team from the first season he would like to compete and select team members for. Michael decided to represent Savage Crew, while Liz picked team members for Dirty Hands. Team Challenge: Teams were given construction materials and blueprints to build the frame for a garage, consisting of four walls and ten trusses. The first team to fully assemble their frame would win the challenge.: Winners: Savage Crew
12	2	"Keep on Baitin"	February 17, 2021	TAN202	3.41
Team Challenge: Each team was given 100 lobster traps, each of which had to be baited and transported onto their team's designated boat. The first team to load and secure their baited traps would be declared the winner.: Winners: Dirty Hands; Individual Challenge: Starting out on a boat, each contestant was given a large tank filled with 250 pounds of slime eels. Using a provided mesh bag, they were tasked with moving all of their eels into another tank located on the dock. The last two to finish would face potential elimination in the Overtime challenge.: Bottom Two: Tara, Swifty; Overtime Challenge: Each contestant had a 300 foot length of tangled mooring line with four buoys along its length. The last one to untie their knots, stack all their buoys, and coil their line into its box would be eliminated from the individual competition.: Eliminated: Tara
13	3	"The Roller"	February 24, 2021	TAN203	3.30
Team Challenge: Teams had to construct 150 feet of road by collecting four loads of aggregate and spreading it in a marked area. Once the aggregate was laid, teams would have to use heavy machinery to smooth it down to a thickness of at least six inches. The first to smooth and drive down their road in their team's van would be declared the winner.: Winners: Savage Crew; Individual Challenge: In heats of two, contestants drove a bulldozer through a slalom course, pushing a tire as they weaved around obstacles. The contestant who completed the course and returned to the starting line with the fastest time would win an advantage in the next individual competition.: Winner: Scott; Bottom Two: Liz, Angel; Due to Michael's departure, no Overtime challenge was held and no one was eliminated from the individual competition.
14	4	"It's Gonna Be a Sheep Show"	March 3, 2021	TAN204	3.47
Team Challenge: Each team had 100 hay bales divided into three rows. Teams had to load each row of hay bales onto a trailer and stack them up in a nearby barn. The first team to deliver and stack all 100 hay bales would be declared the winner.: Winners: Dirty Hands; Individual Challenge: Contestants were paired up into teams of two and had to herd exactly four sheep into their marked pen. The last pair to finish would be forced to face each other in the Overtime challenge. As the winner of the last individual challenge, Scott earned the power to assign each of the teams. The pairs selected for the challenge were Scott & Sarah, Swifty & Merryl, Celi & Liz, Iraida & Cyril, and Angel & Patrick.: Bottom Two: Angel, Patrick; Overtime Challenge: Contestants had to use a forge and blacksmith tools to pound two iron rods into horseshoes. The first contestant to nail their horseshoes to a post would be safe and the other would be eliminated from the individual competition.: Eliminated: Angel
15	5	"Pour Your Heart Out"	March 10, 2021	TAN205	2.84
Team Challenge: Each team had to prepare half of the field of the Banc of California Stadium for a soccer match by removing 90 interlocking plastic tiles and stacking them onto pallet, setting up a goal, painting out the lines, and planting two corner flags. The first team to finish would be declared the winner.: Winner: Dirty Hands; Individual Challenge: Each contestant had to build seven stadium seats and install the seats in the correct spots. The last two to finish would face potential elimination in the Overtime challenge.: Winner: Scott; Bottom Two: Aracelis, Liz; Overtime Challenge: Contestants had to replace five empty beer kegs with full kegs of the same beer, properly pour five beers, and load the empty kegs into the back of a pickup truck. The first contestant to finish would be safe and the other would be eliminated from the individual competition.: Eliminated: Aracelis
16	6	"True Colors"	March 17, 2021	TAN206	2.94
Team Challenge: Using a scissor lift and paint rollers, each team was tasked with painting over one half of a mural with gray paint. The first team to completely cover the existing artwork in their section of the mural would be declared the winner.: Winners: Savage Crew; Individual Challenge: Rappelling down the side of a four-story building, contestants had to work in teams of two and alternate between washing windows while suspended in the air and holding the rope for their partner at street level. The last pair to finish would be sent to the Overtime challenge. As winner of the last challenge, Scott was able to choose his partner first. The pairs chosen for this challenge were: Scott & Merryl, Cyril & Liz, Iraida & Patrick, and Sarah & Swifty.: Bottom Two: None (Challenge abandoned); During the individual challenge, Patrick became ill and was taken to the hospital to receive medical attention. The remainder of the challenge was called off and Patrick was eliminated from the individual competition without an Overtime challenge taking place.: Eliminated: Patrick
17	7	"Orange You Glad You're Tough"	March 24, 2021	TAN207	3.18
Team Challenge: Following a plan, teams had to landscape a front yard, which included planting a tree with mulch, planting plants, cutting and laying paving stones, and laying sod. The first team to finish would be declared the winner. Since Patrick was unable to return, Aracelis sat out from this challenge to make the teams even.: Winners: Dirty Hands; Individual Challenge: Contestants had to pick oranges from trees until they were able to pack two 25-pound boxes of small oranges and two 25-pound boxes of large oranges. The last two to finish would face potential elimination in the Overtime challenge.: Winner: Cyril; Bottom Two: Merryl, Iraida; Overtime Challenge: Contestants had to transfer water from a stock tank using a bucket to replenish water being drained out of a tank. The contestant whose tank emptied first would be eliminated from the individual competition.: Eliminated: Merryl
18	8	"Running on Empty"	March 31, 2021	TAN208	3.03
Team Challenge: Teams had to search a car recycling plant for replacement parts to a car: a front bumpers, headlights, a hood, two front doors, a sliding door, taillights, a rear bumper, four wheels, four seats, and a battery. The first team to find and install the parts and then drive the car through a wall of boxes would be declared the winner. Since Patrick was unable to return, Merryl sat out from this challenge to make the teams even.: Winners: Savage Crew; Individual Challenge: Contestants had to drain cars of oil and transfer the oil using a drip pan to a cylinder until they collected 15 quarts of oil. The last two to finish would face potential elimination in the Overtime challenge.: Winner: Sarah; Bottom Two: Iraida, Liz; Overtime Challenge: Contestants had to remove the fly wheel, the exhaust manifold, and the oil pan from an engine. The first contestant to finish would be safe and the other would be eliminated from the individual competition.: Eliminated: Liz
19	9	"Nothing Personal, It's Business"	April 7, 2021	TAN209	3.00
Team Challenge & Tiebreaker: Teams had to install 24 sheets of sheetrock onto a house frame under the supervision of season one first runner-up Danny Moody. The first team to finish would be declared the winner. Since Patrick was unable to return, Swifty sat out from this challenge to make the teams even.: Winners: Savage Crew; Individual Challenge: Contestants had to finish roofing a shed under the supervision of season one contestant Lee Marshall. The contestant who finished first would win an advantage in the next individual competition. The last two to finish would face potential elimination in the Overtime challenge.: Winner: Sarah; Bottom Two: Iraida, Swifty; Overtime Challenge: Contestants had to install a series of pipes so that the water from a shower, sink, and toilet could flow into a bucket. The first contestant to finish would be safe and the other would be eliminated from the individual competition.: Eliminated: Iraida
20	10	"Everything Is On the Line"	April 14, 2021	TAN210	3.30
Individual Challenge: Contestants were paired up into teams of two and had to signal a crane operator to move six metal beams to an iron structure. The first pair to bolt in the beams and attach a Christmas tree and an American flag on the top would advance to the final challenge. The last pair to finish would be forced to face each other in the Overtime challenge. As the winner of the last individual challenge, Sarah earned the power to assign each of the teams. The pairs selected for the challenge were Scott & Sarah and Cyril & Swifty.: Bottom Two: Swifty, Cyril; Overtime Challenge: Contestants had climb to the top of a beam. The first contestant to ring a bell would be safe and the other would be eliminated from the individual competition.: Eliminated: Swifty; Final Challenge: Contestants had to race through a series of obstacles based on previous challenges on the season, having to break through a wall with a sledgehammer, use a jackhammer to release a bolt cutter from a concrete block, cut through a chainlink fence, stack ten lobster traps to climb to the top of a shipping container, saw through a chain to drop an I-beam and cross a gap, and untangle two marine lines to pull up a ladder in order to reach the Ford truck at the finish line. The first contestant to make it through to the end would be declared the Tough as Nails Champion.: Winner: Scott; As the winner of the final challenge, Scott became the Tough as Nails Champion, winning the $200,000 individual prize and a Ford Super Duty truck.
