= Tough as Nails season 1 =

American reality-TV show season

Tough as Nails
- Season 1
- Hosted by: Phil Keoghan
- No. of contestants: 12
- Winner: Kelly "Murph" Murphy
- Runner-up: Danny Moody
- No. of episodes: 10

Release
- Original network: CBS
- Original release: July 8 – September 2, 2020

Season chronology
- Next → Season 2

The first season of the American television series Tough as Nails premiered on CBS on July 8, 2020, and concluded on September 2, 2020. The season was won by Marine Corps veteran Kelly "Murph" Murphy, with drywaller Danny Moody finishing second, and forestry tech Myles V. Polk placing third.

== Cast ==
Contestant	Job	Age	Hometown	Team	Money Earned	Result
Kelly "Murph" Murphy	Marine Corps veteran	47	Paragon, Indiana	Savage Crew	$208,000	Winner
Danny Moody	Drywaller	33	Spokane, Washington	Dirty Hands	$18,000	Runner-up
Myles V. Polk	Forestry tech	28	Tuskegee, Alabama	Dirty Hands	$18,000	Third place
Linda Goodridge	Deputy sheriff	29	Marion, New York	Dirty Hands	$18,000	Punched out ninth
Callie Cattell	Fisherman	28	Bend, Oregon	Dirty Hands	$18,000	Punched out eighth
Young An	Firefighter	36	Alexandria, Virginia	Savage Crew	$8,000	Punched out seventh
Michelle S. Kiddy	Gate agent	62	Alexandria, Kentucky	Savage Crew	$8,000	Punched out sixth
Luis Yuli	Scaffolder	35	The Bronx, New York	Savage Crew	$8,000	Punched out fifth
Tara Davis	Ironworker	30	Elk Plain, Washington	Savage Crew	$8,000	Punched out fourth
Lee Marshall	Roofer	61	St. Louis, Missouri	Dirty Hands	$18,000	Punched out third
Melissa Burns	Farmer	27	Milford Center, Ohio	Dirty Hands	$18,000	Punched out second
Linnett Key	Welder	34	Lecanto, Florida	Savage Crew	$8,000	Punched out first

=== Future appearances ===
Danny Moody and Lee Marshall appeared on the second season as judges during the penultimate episode's challenges. Kelly "Murph" Murphy appeared on the third season during the first challenge at Marine Corps Base Camp Pendleton.

== Cast progress ==
Contestant	1/2	3	4	5	6	7	8	10		
Murph	SAFE	WIN	WIN	SAFE	WIN	WIN	BTM2	LOW	LOW	WINNER
Danny	SAFE	HIGH	WIN	WIN	WIN	HIGH	HIGH	HIGH	HIGH	RUNNER-UP
Myles	LOW	SAFE	HIGH	SAFE	HIGH	BTM2	WIN	BTM2	WIN	THIRD
Linda	HIGH	LOW	SAFE	HIGH	LOW	SAFE	SAFE	WIN	ELIM	
Callie	SAFE	SAFE	LOW	SAFE	LOW	LOW	LOW	ELIM		
Young	BTM2	BTM2	LOW	BTM2	HIGH	SAFE	ELIM			
Michelle	SAFE	SAFE	BTM2	SAFE	BTM2	ELIM				
Luis	SAFE	SAFE	SAFE	LOW	ELIM					
Tara	LOW	SAFE	HIGH	ELIM						
Lee	SAFE	SAFE	ELIM							
Melissa	WIN	ELIM								
Linnett	ELIM									

The contestant won Tough as Nails.
The contestant was declared the runner-up.
The contestant was declared the third place finisher.
The contestant placed the highest in the individual competition and won the challenge.
The contestant placed the second highest in the individual competition and was ultimately declared safe.
The contestant was safe from elimination.
The contestant placed the second lowest in the individual competition but was ultimately declared safe.
The contestant placed the lowest in the individual competition and competed in the overtime challenge but ultimately survived.
The contestant was the loser of the overtime challenge and was eliminated from the individual competition.

== Team progress ==
Team	Money Earned	1/2	3	4	5	6	7	8	9	Tiebreaker
Dirty Hands	$108,000	LOSS	WIN	WIN	WIN	WIN	LOSS	LOSS	LOSS	WIN
Savage Crew	$48,000	WIN	LOSS	LOSS	LOSS	LOSS	WIN	WIN	WIN	LOSS

Won the team challenge.
Lost the team challenge.

== Production ==
On October 3, 2019, it was announced that CBS had ordered Tough as Nails with a 10-episode order. Phil Keoghan hosts the series and serves as executive producer alongside his wife, Louise. In early November, a nationwide casting search took place in the cities of St. Louis, Chicago, Detroit, New York City, Cincinnati, and Las Vegas. On April 29, 2020, it was announced that the series would premiere on July 8, 2020, later making it a two-hour premiere.

== Episodes ==
No. overall	No. in season	Title	Original release date	Prod. code	U.S. viewers (millions)
1	1	"Redefining Toughness"	July 8, 2020	TAN101	4.09
Individual Challenge One: Each contestant was tasked with transporting 24 bags of mortar by wheelbarrow across a set of narrow beams. If at any point a contestant's wheelbarrow fell off a beam or they dropped their bags, they had to forfeit the bags they were currently carrying and return to the start of the course. The winner would earn the right to select team members for the Team Challenges and get first pick of the contestants.: Winner: Danny; Individual Challenge Two: Contestants had to build a brick wall as high as possible within a one-hour time limit. Points were awarded based on the number of bricks correctly laid and deducted for mistakes. The winner would earn the right to select team members for the Team Challenges.: Winner: Luis
2	2	"Get the Job Done"	July 8, 2020	TAN102	4.09
Team Challenge: Teams had to move sections of steel rails to a marked area, secure it with rail joints and railway spikes, and pull a train caboose down the completed track to the finish line. The first team to crossing the finish line would win the challenge.: Winners: Savage Crew; Individual Challenge: Contestants shoveled the equivalent of three times their body weight of coal into a basket. The last to finish from each of two heats would be forced to compete in the Overtime elimination challenge.: Bottom Two: Young, Linnett; Overtime Challenge: Contestants raced by handcar down a stretch of track to collect three tools they used in the team challenge. Each tool was tied down with rope or chains which had to be untied before it could be retrieved. The first contestant to rack all of their tools at the starting line would be safe and the other would be eliminated from the individual competition.: Eliminated: Linnett
3	3	"Heavy Metal"	July 15, 2020	TAN103	3.45
Team Challenge: Teams were given a junked sedan and a selection of tools and given the task of chopping up the vehicle as quickly as possible. The first team to successfully fit the pieces of their car into the provided container would win the challenge.: Winners: Dirty Hands; Individual Challenge: Contestants were tasked with retrieving an alternator from any vehicle in the junkyard. The first to successfully remove an alternator and return with the part would receive an advantage in the next individual challenge. The last two to finish would be forced to compete in the Overtime challenge.: Winner: Murph; Bottom Two: Young, Melissa; Overtime Challenge: Contestants had to remove the tires from three vehicle rims using a selection of tools. The first contestant to remove all three tires would be safe and the other would be eliminated from the individual competition.: Eliminated: Melissa
4	4	"Release the Bull!"	July 22, 2020	TAN104	3.44
Team Challenge: Teams had to construct part of a large fence by installing posts and a gate and securing the perimeter with barbed wire. The first team to get their fence completed properly would win the challenge.: Winners: Dirty Hands; Individual Challenge: Contestants were paired up into teams of two and tasked with connecting eight sections of pipe to create a working field irrigation system. As the winner of the last individual challenge, Murphy earned the power to assign each of the teams. The last team to successfully get their irrigation system working would be forced to face each other in the Overtime challenge. The pairs selected for the challenge were Murph & Danny, Myles & Tara, Callie & Young, Michelle & Lee, and Luis & Linda.: Winners: Murph, Danny; Bottom Two: Michelle, Lee; Overtime Challenge: Contestants had to untie and move hay bales weighing half of their body weight and stack them high enough to reach a bell attached to the rafters of the barn. The first contestant to ring their bell would be safe and the other would be eliminated from the individual competition.: Eliminated: Lee
5	5	"Mind Over Matter"	July 29, 2020	TAN105	3.46
Team Challenge: Teams were instructed to grab three tons of gravel and sand, which they had to collect from various locations around a sand quarry. Each material had to be packed in a specific way. One ton of pea gravel needed to be put into a big super sack, one ton of rock gravel had to be sealed into plastic bags, and one ton of sand had to be poured into large bags and tied off. The first team to pack the correct amount of each material would be declared the winners of the challenge.: Winners: Dirty Hands; Individual Challenge: Contestants were each given a slab of concrete and a sledgehammer and were tasked with breaking pieces small enough to fit through a designated opening. In order to complete the challenge they had to get all of their concrete through the opening, into their dumpster, and clean their job site. The first to complete the challenge would have an advantage in the next individual challenge.: Winners: Danny; Bottom Two: Young, Tara; Overtime Challenge: Contestants had to cross a balance beam with buckets of sand to replenish the sand pouring out of a large funnel on the other side. The contestant whose hourglass ran out first was eliminated.: Eliminated: Tara
6	6	"Game of Telephone"	August 5, 2020	TAN106	3.64
Team Challenge: Each team was tasked with retrieving 18 colored and numbered barrels, which had to loaded into a truck and trailer according to a provided diagram. The first team to load all their barrels in the correct order would be declared the winner.: Winners: Dirty Hands; Individual Challenge: Contestants had to complete a lineworker training exercise by scaling an electrical pole, securing a dummy, and lowering it to the ground. Players competed in two heats, which were selected by Danny as his reward for winning the previous individual challenge. The last one in each heat to complete the challenge would be sent to Overtime.: Winners: Danny, Murph; Bottom Two: Luis, Michelle; Overtime Challenge: Each contestant was given a section of house framing with a light bulb and electrical outlet at either end, along with the materials for installing electrical conduit. The last contestant to install the conduit, thread their wire through to the outlet, and turn on their lightbulb would be eliminated from the individual competition.: Eliminated: Luis
7	7	"Trash Day"	August 12, 2020	TAN107	3.05
Team Challenge: Each team was tasked with packing a garage full of furniture into a moving van. The first team to fit all their items and close the trailer would be declared the winner.: Winners: Savage Crew; Individual Challenge: Contestants were required to race a garbage truck down a suburban road, picking up trash bags along the way. Each bag successfully tossed into the back of the truck scored a point. The contestant with the most points would earn an advantage for the next individual challenge. The two lowest-scoring contestants would be forced to compete in the Overtime challenge.: Winners: Murph; Bottom Two: Myles, Michelle; Overtime Challenge: Each contestant was given a set of brick pavers and were tasked with correctly fitting the bricks into a designated arrangement. The last to finish would be eliminated from the individual competition.: Eliminated: Michelle
8	8	"Trust Your Gear"	August 19, 2020	TAN108	2.64
Team Challenge: Teams were given a set of forest firefighting tools and tasked with clearing out a 60 by six foot section of brush to create a firebreak. Once they were finished, a judge would check their work. The first team to have their work approved by the judge would be the winner.: Winners: Savage Crew; Individual Challenge: Contestants participated in a simulated firefighter rescue which tasked them with retrieving a dummy through a set of obstacles. The contestants with the two slowest times would be forced to compete in the Overtime challenge. As the winner of the last individual competition, Murph got a time advantage which would reduce his recorded time by 30 seconds.: Winners: Myles; Bottom Two: Murph, Young; Overtime Challenge: Each contestant had to connect lengths of fire hose as they ascended a building to the roof and put out two fires back on the ground. Once the fires were out, they would then rappel down the side of the building to complete the course. The contestant with the slowest time would be eliminated from the individual competition.: Eliminated: Young
9	9	"Cut It Up"	August 26, 2020	TAN109	2.86
Team Challenge: Teams competed against each other one-on-one in a choice of three Woodsman events: underhand chop, single buck sawing, and chainsaw. Each team would alternate choosing the competitors for each round, with the other team choosing the event. The winner of each challenge earned an axe for their team. The first team to five axes would be the winner.: Winners: Savage Crew; Savage Crew's win put the final team challenge tally at four-four, triggering a tiebreaker to determine the overall winner. Tiebreaker: Each team would have to choose one member of their team to compete in all three Woodsman events back-to-back. The first one to finish would earn the overall title for their team. Savage Crew chose Murph, and Dirty Hands chose Danny.: Winner: Dirty Hands; By winning the tiebreaker, Dirty Hands won the team competition and the $60,000 prize.
10	10	"Finish the Job"	September 2, 2020	TAN110	3.11
Individual Challenge One: Contestants were given twenty-five logs and tasked with chopping them small enough to fit through a specified opening. The last two contestants to chop and stack all of their wood would be sent to compete in the Overtime challenge.: Bottom Two: Callie, Myles; Overtime: Each contestant was given a set of chisels, a hammer, and a set of 'tree cookies' and had to chisel out the center of the cookie in order to fit them all on a four inch by four inch square peg. The last contestant to stack three cookies onto their peg would be eliminated from the individual competition.: Eliminated: Callie; Individual Challenge Two: Contestants raced inside of a warehouse to correctly secure marked barrels and boxes onto wooden pallets, and use a forklift to move the pallets into their designated shelf. Unlike previous challenges, the contestant with the slowest time would be instantly eliminated without an Overtime round.: Eliminated: Linda; Final Challenge: Contestants raced through a series of obstacles based on previous challenges on the season, having to break walls to move bales of hay, untangle chains around ladders, secure a chain cargo net, and saw wooden steps in order to reach the Ford truck at the finish line. The first contestant to make it through to the end would be declared the Tough as Nails Champion.: Winner: Murph; As the winner of the final challenge, Murph became the Tough as Nails Champion, winning the $200,000 individual prize and a Ford Super Duty truck.
