= Merryl Tengesdal =

American U-2 pilot

Colonel Merryl (David) Tengesdal
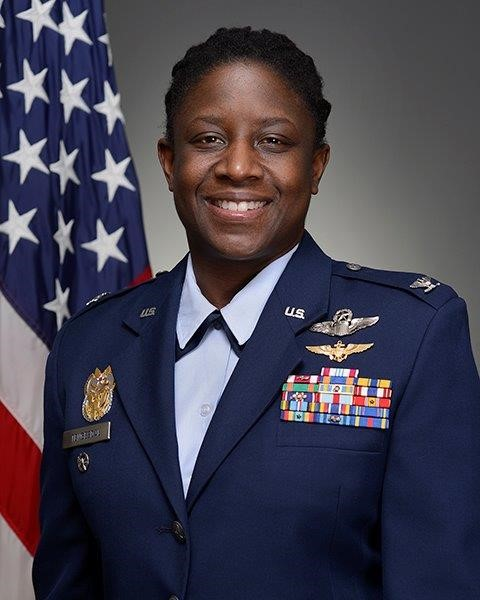
- Born: The Bronx, New York, U.S.
- Spouse: Kjell Tengesdal
- Military career
- Allegiance: United States
- Branch: United States Navy; United States Air Force
- Service years: 1994–2017
- Rank: Colonel
- Commands: Det 2/WR-ALC Plant 42
- Conflicts: Operation Enduring Freedom; Iraq War
- Awards: Legion of Merit; Defense Meritorious Service Medal; Meritorious Service Medal (2)

Merryl Tengesdal (born 1971) is an American retired career military officer who is the first and only Black woman to fly the United States Air Force's U-2 spy plane used for specialized high-altitude reconnaissance missions. She is one of five women and only the fourth Black person (in 2004) to be in the U-2 program. She shares the plane's nickname, The Dragon Lady.

Tengesdal is a military veteran, aviator, and commander who served in both the US Navy and the US Air Force. She served as Director of Inspections for The Air Force Inspector General from October 2015 through August 2017, retiring at the rank of United States Air Force Colonel.

Tengesdal had also served in the Iraq War and the War in Afghanistan.

== Biography ==
=== Early life ===
Born Merryl David in The Bronx, New York, she attended local schools and developed an early interest in flying and the space program. Her goal was to be an astronaut.

She graduated from the University of New Haven with a Bachelor of Science degree in electrical engineering, one of three women to complete the program. She played on the basketball team and was in the ROTC.

=== Navy service ===
She entered the Navy and was admitted to Officer Candidate School, where she was commissioned in 1994 after graduation. Merryl began a career as a Naval Aviator by flying the SH-60B Seahawk Helicopter at Naval Station Mayport, Florida. During that time, she deployed on two long cruises and multiple short cruises to the Middle East, South America, and the Caribbean.

After a three-year sea tour in helicopters, Merryl became a T-34C and T-6A Instructor Pilot. After completing T-6A Instructor Training, she became one of four Navy T-6A Instructors to train Navy and Air Force students at Joint Student Undergraduate Pilot Training (JSUPT) at Moody Air Force Base, Georgia. Her Navy flight instructor, Commander Ron Robinson, said that she "was one of my best flight students, and it doesn't surprise me that she's doing so well."

=== Air Force service ===
After David completed her Navy obligation, she continued her military career by transferring to the Air Force to fly the Lockheed U-2S Dragon Lady at Beale Air Force Base in Northern California. She was promoted to Major and began flying the U-2 in 2004, the first African-American woman to do so. Continuing to fly it, she was deployed to multiple locations in support of Operations OLIVE HARVEST, ENDURING FREEDOM, IRAQI FREEDOM, and HORN OF AFRICA. While stationed at Beale AFB the first time, she held the positions of 9th Reconnaissance Wing (9th RW) Chief of Flight Safety and 9th Physiological Support Squadron Director of Operations.

She married and took the surname Tengesdal. After her tour at Beale AFB, Tengesdal became the Detachment Commander of Detachment 2 WR/ALC Palmdale, California, where she was in charge of flight test and Program Depot Maintenance for the U-2S aircraft. Thereafter, Tengesdal worked at the North American Aerospace Defense Command (NORAD) and U.S. Northern Command (NORTHCOM) J8 staff. As Chief of Studies and Assessments Branch, she was responsible for developing the Command's position on capability gap assessment(s), development, and integration for senior-level documents submitted to the Joint Staff. Tengesdal returned to Beale and held the positions of Deputy Operations Group Commander and Inspector General, 9th RW, Beale AFB, CA.

During these years, Tengesdal received advanced training and graduate education through Air Force and private university sources. In 2005, she took classes at the Air Command and Staff College, Non-Resident Program, Maxwell AFB, Alabama. Later she completed a Masters of Aeronautical Science in 2008 at Embry–Riddle Aeronautical University, Florida. In 2011, she did additional studies at the Air War College, Non-Resident Program, again at Maxwell AFB.

Tengesdal's final duty, beginning in October 2015 with a promotion to Colonel, was as Director of Inspections for The Inspector General (TIG) of the Air Force, Office of the Secretary of the Air Force, Pentagon, Washington DC. The Inspections Directorate develops, revises, coordinates, and implements Air Force inspection policy, and provides oversight and reporting of inspection programs to TIG, Chief of Staff of the Air Force, and Secretary of the Air Force on the readiness, economy, efficiency, compliance and state of discipline of the Air Force. Tengesdal was also served as Executive Secretary of the Air Force Inspection System Council.

In 2017, Tengesdal retired from the Air Force as a colonel, with more than 3,400 flight hours and 330 combat hours. Over 1,000 of those flight hours are in the U-2.

=== Flight rating ===
- Rating: Command Pilot
- Flight Hours: more than 3,400 with over 330 combat hours
- Aircraft Flown: T-34C, TH-57 B/C, SH-60B, T-6A, T-38A/B/C, U-2S

=== Assignments ===
- Officer Candidate School, NAS Pensacola, Florida, June 1994 – September 1994
- Aviation Pre-Flight Indoctrination, NAS Pensacola, Florida, September 1994 – March 1995
- Primary Flight Training, NAS Corpus Christi, Texas, Squadron VT-27, March 1995 – September 1995
- Helicopter Flight Training, NAS Pensacola, Florida, September 1995 – August 1996
- SH-60B Fleet Replacement Squadron, NS Mayport, Florida, September 1996 – September 1997
- SH-60B Pilot, NAS Mayport, Florida, September 1997 – June 2000
- T-34C Pilot Instructor Training, NS Corpus Christi, Texas, June 2000 – December 2000
- T-6A Pilot Instructor Training, Randolph AFB, Texas, December 2000 – October 2001
- T-6A Instructor, Moody AFB, Georgia, October 2001 – March 2004
- U-2 Student Pilot, Beale AFB, California, March 2004 – April 2005
- U-2 Instructor Pilot/Sq Chief of Safety, Beale AFB, California, April 2005 – June 2006
- U-2 Instructor Pilot/ Wing Chief of Flt Safety, Beale AFB, California, June 2006 – July 2007
- U-2 /T38-A Instructor Pilot/9 PSPTS Director of Operations, Beale AFB, California, July 2007 – November 2008
- Commander Det 2/WR-ALC Plant 42, Palmdale, California, November 2008 – December 2010
- NORAD/NORTHCOM J8 Staff, Peterson AFB, Colorado, December 2010 – August 2013
- Deputy Operations Group Commander, 9th Reconnaissance Wing, Beale AFB, California, September 2013 – 2014
- Inspector General, 9th Reconnaissance Wing, Beale AFB, California, September 2014 – October 2015
- Director of Inspections, Office of the Air Force Inspector General, Washington, October 2015 – August 2017

=== Awards and decorations ===
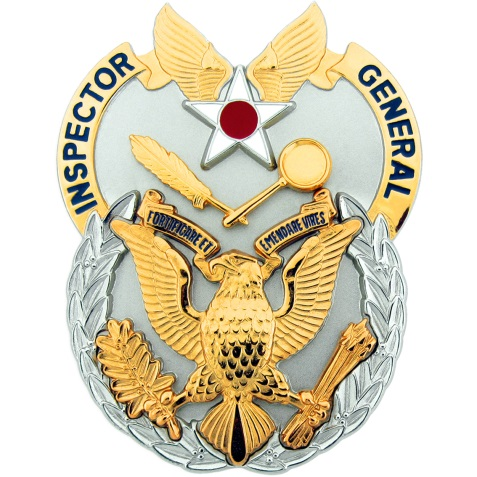
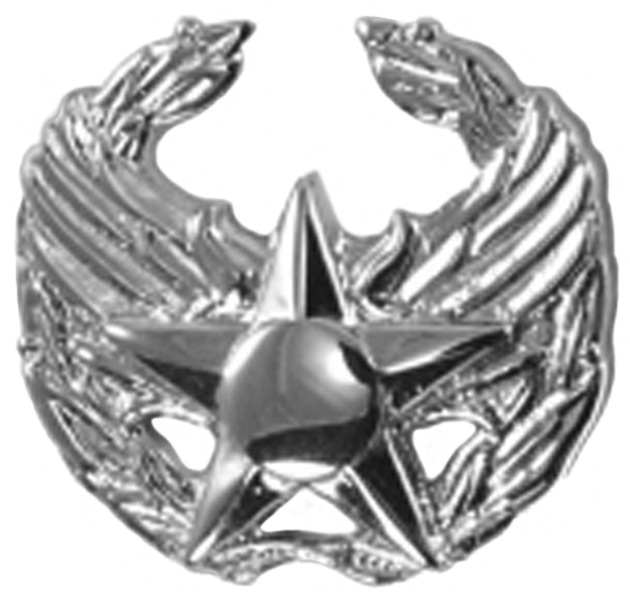
Command Air Force Pilot Badge
United States Naval Aviator Badge
Air Force Inspector General Badge
Air Force Commander's Insignia

Legion of Merit Medal
Defense Meritorious Service Medal
Meritorious Service Medal with two oak leaf clusters
Air Medal
Air Force Commendation Medal
Navy Achievement Medal
Joint Meritorious Unit Award with oak leaf cluster
Air Force Meritorious Unit Award
Air Force Outstanding Unit Award with silver and two bronze oak leaf clusters
Air Force Recognition Ribbon
National Defense Service Medal with bronze service star
Armed Forces Expeditionary Medal
Global War on Terrorism Service Medal
Nuclear Deterrence Operations Service Medal
Sea Service Deployment Ribbon with bronze service star
Air Force Longevity Service Award with two bronze oak leaf clusters
Air Force Training Ribbon

- ACC Aerospace Physiologist of the Year 2008

=== Education ===
- 1994 – Bachelor of Science Electrical Engineering, University of New Haven, Connecticut
- 2005 – Air Command and Staff College, Non-Resident Program, Maxwell AFB, Alabama
- 2008 – Masters of Aeronautical Science, Embry–Riddle Aeronautical University, Florida
- 2011 – Air War College, Non-Resident Program, Maxwell AFB, AL
- 2021 – Doctor of Engineering (honorary), University of New Haven, Connecticut

=== Effective dates of promotion ===
- Ensign – 9 September 1994
- Lieutenant Junior Grade – 9 September 1996
- Lieutenant – 9 October 1998
- Major – 5 April 2004
- Lieutenant Colonel – 1 February 2010
- Colonel – 1 October 2015

== Personal life ==
Tengesdal is married to Kjell Tengesdal and has two children. She is a personal trainer, author, leadership consultant, and motivational speaker.

In 2013, her alma mater, the University of New Haven, Connecticut, gave her the Distinguished Alumni award.

In 2021, Tengesdal was a competitor on the second season of the CBS reality series Tough as Nails. She was on Team Savage Crew.

== See also ==
- List of firsts in aviation
