= Tough as Nails season 5 =

American reality-TV show season

Tough as Nails
- Season 5
- Hosted by: Phil Keoghan
- No. of contestants: 12
- Winner: Ben Dempsey
- Runner-up: Todd Anderson
- No. of episodes: 10

Release
- Original network: CBS
- Original release: July 2 – July 30, 2023

Season chronology
- ← Previous; Season 4

The fifth and final season of the American television series Tough as Nails premiered on CBS on July 2, 2023 and concluded on July 30. The season was won by tile setter Ben Dempsey, with toolmaker Todd Anderson finishing second, and jack of all trades Kenji Ngo placing third.

== Cast ==
Contestant	Job	Age	Hometown	Team	Money Earned	Result
Ben Dempsey	Tile setter	33	Halifax, Nova Scotia	Dirty Hands	$240,000	Winner
Todd Anderson	Toolmaker	58	Janesville, Wisconsin	Dirty Hands	$30,000	Runner-up
Kenji Ngo	Jack of all trades	39	Delaware, Ohio	Dirty Hands	$33,000	Third place
Jessica Hayes	Remodeling contractor	35	Cedar Park, Texas	Savage Crew	$8,000	Punched out ninth
Dustin Bradford	Firefighter	34	Edmonton, Alberta	Savage Crew	$9,000	Punched out eighth
Akeela Al-Hameed	Firefighter	34	Fridley, Minnesota	Savage Crew	$8,000	Punched out seventh
Paul Hamilton	Maintenance supervisor	56	Airdrie, Alberta	Savage Crew	$14,000	Punched out sixth
Cheryl Lieteau	Carpenter	55	Dudley, Massachusetts	Dirty Hands	$20,000	Punched out fifth
Marcus Jones	CO2 technician	49	Fort Worth, Texas	Savage Crew	$12,000	Punched out fourth
Carly Steiman	Electrician	32	North Vancouver, British Columbia	Dirty Hands	$20,000	Punched out third
Yesi Reyes	Ironworker	31	Los Angeles, California	Dirty Hands	$20,000	Punched out second
Carolina Paredes	Motorcycle Builder	42	Houston, Texas	Savage Crew	$8,000	Punched out first

== Cast progress ==
Contestant	2	3	4	5	6	7	8	9	10	
Ben	WIN	SAFE	SAFE	SAFE	WIN	WIN	LOW	WIN	SAFE	WINNER
Todd	SAFE	SAFE	SAFE	SAFE	SAFE	SAFE	BTM2	BTM2	WIN	RUNNER-UP
Kenji	SAFE	SAFE	SAFE	WIN	LOW	BTM2	WIN	LOW	BTM2	THIRD
Jessica	BTM2	BTM2	SAFE	HIGH	SAFE	LOW	HIGH	HIGH	ELIM	
Dustin	WIN	HIGH	LOW	SAFE	LOW	HIGH	SAFE	ELIM		
Akeela	SAFE	SAFE	HIGH	SAFE	BTM2	SAFE	ELIM			
Paul	SAFE	WIN	BTM2	LOW	WIN	ELIM				
Cheryl	SAFE	SAFE	SAFE	BTM2	ELIM					
Marcus	SAFE	SAFE	WIN	ELIM						
Carly	SAFE	SAFE	ELIM							
Yesi	SAFE	ELIM								
Carolina	ELIM									

The contestant won Tough as Nails.
The contestant was declared the first runner-up.
The contestant was declared the second runner-up.
The contestant placed the highest in the individual competition and won the challenge.
The contestant placed the second highest in the individual competition and was ultimately declared safe.
The contestant was safe from elimination.
The contestant was the last declared safe in the individual competition.
The contestant placed in the bottom two in the individual competition and competed in the overtime challenge but ultimately survived.
The contestant was the loser of the overtime challenge and was eliminated from the individual competition.

== Team progress ==
Team	Money Earned	1	2	3	4	5	6	7	8	9
Dirty Hands	$120,000	LOSS	WIN	LOSS	WIN	WIN	WIN	LOSS	WIN	LOSS
Savage Crew	$48,000	WIN	LOSS	WIN	LOSS	LOSS	LOSS	WIN	LOSS	WIN

Won the team challenge.
Lost the team challenge.

== Production ==
On March 9, 2022, CBS announced that Tough as Nails was renewed for a fifth season. Starting with the fifth season, Canadians were eligible to apply for the show. Unlike the first four seasons, which filmed in Southern California, the fifth season filmed in Hamilton, Ontario in August 2022. Actor and Hamilton native Martin Short made a cameo appearance during the first episode.

== Episodes ==
No. overall	No. in season	Title	Original release date	Prod. code	U.S. viewers (millions)	Rating
41	1	"Tough Times Don't Last but Tough People Do"	July 2, 2023	TAN501	1.88	0.2
Individual Challenge: Contestants had to cut up 500 pounds of scrap metal, with each piece no longer than 20 inches. The first two to finish won the ability to choose the teams, with the overall winner picking first.: Winners: Ben, Paul; Teams Challenge: Teams had to pressure wash, dry, and repaint one half of a tugboat's hull. Teams then to replace five tires. The first team to finish won the challenge.: Winners: Savage Crew
42	2	"First Dance"	July 2, 2023	TAN502	1.88	0.2
Teams Challenge: Once team had to use heavy machinery to fill large bags with soil, while the other teams had to use wheelbarrows and shovels to fill small bags with mulch. After 30 minutes, teams had to switch. After one hour, the team with more bags would win the challenge.: Winners: Dirty Hands; Individual Challenge: Contestants had to pair up and use a tractor to roll up sod. The pair with the most sod after 20 minutes won $2,000. The pair with the least sod faced potential elimination in the Overtime challenge. The pairs were Carly & Yesi, Dustin & Ben, Carolina & Jessica, Todd & Paul, Kenji & Akeela, and Cheryl & Marcus.: Winners: Ben, Dustin; Bottom Two: Carolina, Jessica; Overtime Challenge: Contestants had to assemble a floating surface aerator and install it in the middle of a pond using a leaking canoe. The first contestant to finish was safe and the other was eliminated from the individual competition.: Eliminated: Carolina
43	3	"Zink About It"	July 7, 2023	TAN503	2.15	0.2
Teams Challenge: Teams had to assemble a trailer frame, which would be dipped in zinc. After smoothing out the frame, teams had to finish assembling the trailer. The first team to finish would win the challenge.: Winners: Savage Crew; Individual Challenge: Contestants had 90 minutes to assemble a structure that could withstand a 2,316-pound weight. The first contestant whose structure help up for ten seconds would win $3,000. The two contestants with the weakest structures faced potential elimination in the Overtime challenge.: Winner: Paul; Bottom Two: Yesi, Jessica; Overtime Challenge: Contestants had to assemble an eagle sculpture. The first contestant to finish was safe and the other was eliminated from the individual competition.: Eliminated: Yesi
44	4	"Man Made It, These Hands Can Fix It"	July 9, 2023	TAN504	2.08	0.2
Teams Challenge: Teams had to prepare three whoops at a motocross track. The first team to finish would win the challenge.: Winners: Dirty Hands; Individual Challenge: In heats of two, contestants had to run across a mud pit to an ATV, drive back across the pit to a log, and then drag the log out of the pit with the ATV. The fastest contestant would win $4,000. The two slowest contestants faced potential elimination in the Overtime challenge.: Winner: Marcus; Bottom Two: Carly, Paul; Overtime Challenge: Contestants had to replace two shock absorbers on an ATV. The first contestant to finish was safe and the other was eliminated from the individual competition.: Eliminated: Carly
45	5	"How Do You Like Them Apples?"	July 14, 2023	TAN505	2.14	0.2
Teams Challenge: Teams had to load a trailer that was being pulled by a tractor with as many bushels of apples as possible. The team with more apples would win the challenge.: Winners: Dirty Hands; Individual Challenge: Contestants had to install 30 sapling stakes. The first contestant to finish would win $5,000 while the last two contestants would face potential elimination in the Overtime Challenge.: Winner: Kenji; Bottom Two: Cheryl, Marcus; Overtime Challenge: Contestants had to grind and press apples until they filled four jugs with juice. The first contestant to finish was safe and the other was eliminated from the individual competition.: Eliminated: Marcus
46	6	"Just Trying to Be Me"	July 16, 2023	TAN506	1.96	0.1
Teams Challenge: Teams had to search a home improvement store for 45 items on a purchase order. The first team to check out and load their items on a truck and trailer would win the challenge.: Winners: Dirty Hands; Individual Challenge: Contestants had to pair up, load a pickup truck with building supplies, drive over a bumpy road, and then unload the truck; teams had to stop and reload any items that fell off the truck or touched the ground before proceeding. Teams competed in one of two heats. The pair with the fastest time would share $6,000. The pairs that lost each heat raced one last time, with the members of the losing team competing against each other in the Overtime Challenge. The pairs were Kenji and Dustin, Todd and Jessica, Paul and Ben, and Akeela and Cheryl.: Winners: Ben, Paul; Bottom Two: Akeela, Cheryl; Overtime Challenge: Contestants had to carry buckets of concrete through an obstacle course until they reach a tube. The first contestant to fill the tube was safe and the other was eliminated from the individual competition.: Eliminated: Cheryl
47	7	"Boom or Bust"	July 21, 2023	TAN507	2.16	0.2
Teams Challenge: Teams had to build three gabion baskets and fill them with rocks. The first team to finish would win the challenge.: Winners: Savage Crew; Individual Challenge: Contestants had to set up and fill twenty blasting holes for explosion. The first contestant to finish would win $7,000 while the last two contestants would face potential elimination in the Overtime Challenge.: Winner: Ben; Bottom Two: Paul, Kenji; Overtime Challenge: Contestants had to fill a hibernaculum with logs and rocks before covering it with sod. The first contestant to finish was safe and the other was eliminated from the individual competition.: Eliminated: Paul
48	8	"You Can't Always Be the Hammer"	July 23, 2023	TAN508	2.19	0.2
Teams Challenge: Teams had to assemble five pieces of playground equipment. The first team to finish would win the challenge.: Winners: Dirty Hands; Individual Challenge: Contestants had to assemble three bicycles. The first contestant to finish would win $8,000 while the last two contestants would face potential elimination in the Overtime Challenge.: Winner: Kenji; Bottom Two: Akeela, Todd; Overtime Challenge: Contestants had to assemble a post and perch for an eagle sculpture. The first contestant to finish was safe and the other was eliminated from the individual competition.: Eliminated: Akeela
49	9	"Winning's Not Everything, But Losing Sucks"	July 28, 2023	TAN509	2.26	0.2
Teams Challenge: Teams had to compete in a one-on-one battle of the trades: using a rasp plane to shave down a plank, pulling a log 100 feet, and chopping a standing log in half. The winner of each round won a hatchet, with the fourth one worth two. After a team won five hatchets, they won the challenge. Everyone had to go at least once before they could go again.: Winners: Savage Crew; Individual Challenge: Contestants had to assemble a picnic table. The first contestant to finish would win $9,000 while the last two contestants would face potential elimination in the Overtime Challenge.: Winner: Ben; Bottom Two: Dustin, Todd; Overtime Challenge: Contestants had to cut logs into eight 2x4s and four 2x8s using a portable milling machine. The first contestant to finish was safe and the other was eliminated from the individual competition.: Eliminated: Dustin
50	10	"Ready for Take Off"	July 30, 2023	TAN510	2.43	0.2
Individual Challenge: Contestants had to reverse a flatbed truck through a slalom course, picking up loads of tires, concrete blocks, and soil along the way. The contestant with the fastest time won $10,000, and the two contestants with the slowest times faced potential elimination in the Overtime Challenge.: Winner: Todd; Bottom Two: Jessica, Kenji; Overtime Challenge: Contestants had to connect conduit and wire to four lights atop a metal structure. The first contestant to finish was safe and the other was eliminated from the individual competition.: Eliminated: Jessica; Final Challenge: Contestants had to run through a gauntlet based on previous challenges.: Winner: Ben; As the winner of the final challenge, Ben became the Tough as Nails Champion, winning the $200,000 individual prize and a Ford Lightning truck.
