= List of Tough as Nails episodes =

Tough as Nails is an American reality competition television series that premiered on CBS on July 8, 2020, and is hosted by Phil Keoghan.

During the course of the series, 50 episodes of Tough as Nails aired over five seasons, between July 8, 2020, and July 30, 2023.

== Series overview ==
Season	Contestants	Episodes	Originally released		Winner	Runner-up
Season	Contestants	Episodes	First released	Last released	Winner	Runner-up
1	12	10	July 8, 2020	September 2, 2020	Kelly "Murph" Murphy	Danny Moody
2	12	10	February 10, 2021	April 14, 2021	Scott Henry	Cyril "Zeus" Ontai III
3	12	10	October 6, 2021	December 8, 2021	Lia Mort	Dequincey "Quincey" Walker
4	12	10	January 4, 2023	February 22, 2023	Jorge Zavala	Mister Frost
5	12	10	July 2, 2023	July 30, 2023	Ben Dempsey	Todd Anderson

== Episodes ==
=== Season 1 (2020) ===
No. overall	No. in season	Title	Original release date	Prod. code	U.S. viewers (millions)
1	1	"Redefining Toughness"	July 8, 2020	TAN101	4.09
2	2	"Get the Job Done"	July 8, 2020	TAN102	4.09
3	3	"Heavy Metal"	July 15, 2020	TAN103	3.45
4	4	"Release the Bull!"	July 22, 2020	TAN104	3.44
5	5	"Mind Over Matter"	July 29, 2020	TAN105	3.46
6	6	"Game of Telephone"	August 5, 2020	TAN106	3.64
7	7	"Trash Day"	August 12, 2020	TAN107	3.05
8	8	"Trust Your Gear"	August 19, 2020	TAN108	2.64
9	9	"Cut It Up"	August 26, 2020	TAN109	2.86
10	10	"Finish the Job"	September 2, 2020	TAN110	3.11

=== Season 2 (2021) ===
No. overall	No. in season	Title	Original release date	Prod. code	U.S. viewers (millions)
11	1	"Just Another Day On the Job"	February 10, 2021	TAN201	3.49
12	2	"Keep on Baitin"	February 17, 2021	TAN202	3.41
13	3	"The Roller"	February 24, 2021	TAN203	3.30
14	4	"It's Gonna Be a Sheep Show"	March 3, 2021	TAN204	3.47
15	5	"Pour Your Heart Out"	March 10, 2021	TAN205	2.84
16	6	"True Colors"	March 17, 2021	TAN206	2.94
17	7	"Orange You Glad You're Tough"	March 24, 2021	TAN207	3.18
18	8	"Running on Empty"	March 31, 2021	TAN208	3.03
19	9	"Nothing Personal, It's Business"	April 7, 2021	TAN209	3.00
20	10	"Everything Is On the Line"	April 14, 2021	TAN210	3.30

=== Season 3 (2021) ===
No. overall	No. in season	Title	Original release date	Prod. code	U.S. viewers (millions)
21	1	"Ready for Battle"	October 6, 2021	TAN301	3.11
22	2	"Fight Tooth and Nail"	October 13, 2021	TAN302	2.93
23	3	"It's a Bird, It's a Plane, It's a Freight Train"	October 20, 2021	TAN303	2.75
24	4	"Facing Fear"	October 27, 2021	TAN304	2.82
25	5	"Pressure Don't Scare Me"	November 3, 2021	TAN305	2.64
26	6	"Mud and Mayhem"	November 10, 2021	TAN306	2.79
27	7	"Mic Drop"	November 17, 2021	TAN307	2.80
28	8	"Battle Lines"	November 24, 2021	TAN308	3.06
29	9	"Bull In a China Shop"	December 1, 2021	TAN309	2.84
30	10	"Dreams Never Die"	December 8, 2021	TAN310	2.89

=== Season 4 (2023) ===
No. overall	No. in season	Title	Original release date	Prod. code	U.S. viewers (millions)
31	1	"Welcome to Catalina Island"	January 4, 2023	TAN401	2.15
32	2	"Perfect Symphony"	January 4, 2023	TAN402	2.15
33	3	"I Look Like Curious George"	January 11, 2023	TAN403	1.91
34	4	"That's a Safety Hazard"	January 18, 2023	TAN404	1.82
35	5	"Crush It!"	January 25, 2023	TAN405	2.15
36	6	"Rise and Grind"	February 1, 2023	TAN406	1.89
37	7	"Skills to Pay the Bills"	February 8, 2023	TAN407	1.93
38	8	"Pressure Is On"	February 15, 2023	TAN408	1.80
39	9	"This Is Not a Sprint, It's a Marathon"	February 22, 2023	TAN409	2.09
40	10	"Keep Battling 'til the End"	February 22, 2023	TAN410	2.09

=== Season 5 (2023) ===
No. overall	No. in season	Title	Original release date	Prod. code	U.S. viewers (millions)	Rating
41	1	"Tough Times Don't Last but Tough People Do"	July 2, 2023	TAN501	1.88	0.2
42	2	"First Dance"	July 2, 2023	TAN502	1.88	0.2
43	3	"Zink About It"	July 7, 2023	TAN503	2.15	0.2
44	4	"Man Made It, These Hands Can Fix It"	July 9, 2023	TAN504	2.08	0.2
45	5	"How Do You Like Them Apples?"	July 14, 2023	TAN505	2.14	0.2
46	6	"Just Trying to Be Me"	July 16, 2023	TAN506	1.96	0.1
47	7	"Boom or Bust"	July 21, 2023	TAN507	2.16	0.2
48	8	"You Can't Always Be the Hammer"	July 23, 2023	TAN508	2.19	0.2
49	9	"Winning's Not Everything, But Losing Sucks"	July 28, 2023	TAN509	2.26	0.2
50	10	"Ready for Take Off"	July 30, 2023	TAN510	2.43	0.2
