= That's Fairly Interesting =

That's Fairly Interesting was a New Zealand TV series showcasing quirky people and events.

Its title was reference to the American show That's Incredible! The company that produced the programme was Communicado - owned by Neil Roberts, Murray Roberts, Garry McAlpine and Robyn Scholes. Communicado produced TV shows, advertisements and films, including Once Were Warriors.

The programme's reporters included Neil Roberts, Phil Gifford, Sue Kedgley, Tim Shadbolt, Eliza Bidois, Kerry Smith, Belinda Todd, Mark Leishman, Juliet Monaghan, Khali Winitana, Vicki Walker and Phil Keoghan, who later became famous for hosting the US show The Amazing Race.

== Link ==
- Segment on Pat's Uninteresting Tours (July 1988) via YouTube

http://www.nzonscreen.com/person/neil-roberts/biography
