= No Opportunity Wasted =

- Created by: Phil Keoghan
- Country of origin: United States

Original release
- Network: Discovery Channel
- Release: October 3, 2004

No Opportunity Wasted is an American television series that premiered on the Discovery Channel on October 3, 2004. It was created by Phil Keoghan, better known as the host of the CBS reality competition show The Amazing Race.

In the series, 26 contestants are given 72 hours, $3,000 and the opportunity to fulfill a long-held dream or desire.

A version was also produced for broadcast in New Zealand, reflecting Phil Keoghan's fondness for his native country. Also hosted by Keoghan, the show proceeded on much the same premise but with local contestants. It premiered on New Zealand's TV2 on Sunday, November 12, 2006. It was sponsored by Vodafone, whose slogan is Make the Most of Now.

A third version of the series premiered on CBC in Canada on October 3, 2007. Ten thirty-minute episodes were filmed, hosted by Canadian adventurer Bruce Kirkby following a May 2007 casting tour through the country by Keoghan.
