= Bruce Kirkby =

- Born: Toronto, Ontario
- Education: Engineering Physics, Queen's University (1990)
- Occupations: Adventure Writer and Photographer
- Notable work: Sand Dance (2000), Dolphin's Tooth (2005)
- Television: Host, No Opportunity Wasted, CBC
- Family: Christine Pitkanen (wife); Bodi; Taj
- Website: brucekirkby.com

Bruce Kirkby is a Canadian adventurer, photographer, and writer. Recognized for expeditions to remote wilderness areas, his achievements include a 40-day, 1000-kilometre crossing of Arabia's Empty Quarter by camel (1999) and the first contiguous descent of Ethiopia's Blue Nile Gorge from source to the Sudanese border (with National Geographic). The author of three best-selling books, Kirkby's writing has appeared in numerous publications, including The Globe and Mail, Canadian Geographic and The New York Times. National Geographic Channel featured his photography in the documentary Through the Lens (2003). An Ambassador for Mountain Equipment Co-op and member of the Starboard SUP Dream Team, Kirkby makes his home in Kimberley, British Columbia.

== Expeditions ==
- 2011: 80-day horse-supported traverse of Republic of Georgia's Caucasus Mountains, from Svaneti to Tusheti (avoiding South Ossetia); accompanied by his wife and two boys (aged 10 months and 4 years)
- 2010: Traverse of Axel Heiberg Island (Canadian High Arctic)
- 2006: Canoe descent Hess River (Yukon); remote, class IV whitewater.
- 2005: Transect of Northern Mongolia by Horseback.
- 2003: Sea kayak traverse of Northern Borneo; 530 kilometres of rarely travelled and roadless coastline.
- 2003: Iceland coast-to-coast trek; 870 km in 37 days.
- 2003: Sea kayaking exploration of Scoresby Sund (world's largest fiord) on Greenland's east coast; 480 km in 26 days.
- 2001: The Grand Cirque; a 1500-kilometer, 65-day circumnavigation of British Columbia's southern coast range. Travelled by up coast by sea kayak, across Coast Mountains by foot, and down the Fraser River system by raft. Climbed N.W. Summit of Mount Waddington en route, and navigated Hells Gate.
- 2000: Canol Trail; A rare (possibly first) unsupported traverse of the abandoned CANOL Pipeline Canol Heritage Trail in the Northwest Territories' Mackenzie Mountains; 380 km in 17 days.
- 1999: Blue Nile Gorge; Forty-five-day descent of Ethiopia's Blue Nile Gorge by raft as part of National Geographic Expedition; marked by gunfights, hostage taking and crocodile attacks.
- 1999: Arabia's Empty Quarter; A forty-day, 1000-kilometer crossing of Arabia's southern sand desert.
- 1998: Mount McKinley (Denali), Alaska; 23-day expedition on West Buttress route, reached summit twice.
- 1997: Mount Everest, Communications Coordinator for Canadian Team; spent two months at base camp, involved with rescues of crashed helicopter and fallen Sherpa.
- 1991: Karakoram Highway; Two-month mountain bike journey through Northern Pakistan.

Kirkby has over 2,000 days of experience as a commercial guide, including raft descents of Tatshenshini, Alsek, First, Burnside, Grand Canyon and Nahanni, and sea kayak journeys along the Canadian West Coast and Belize's Barrier Reef.

His travels cover 80 countries, and include the Galapagos Islands, China, Hong Kong, Tibet, Bhutan, Iceland, Greenland, Borneo, Myanmar, Bali, Sikkim, Ecuador, Pakistan, Saba, Patagonia, Kenya, Bahamas Saba Cambodia, Vietnam and Mongolia.

== Writing ==
A travel correspondent with The Globe and Mail, Kirkby has acted as Editor-at-Large for Outpost Magazine, Contributing Editor to Explore Magazine, and photographic columnist for Up! Magazine. His writing has appeared in numerous publications, including The New York Times, enRoute, Huffington Post, and Canadian Geographic.

Kirkby is the author of:

- Sand Dance, By Camel Across Arabia's Great Southern Desert (2000 – McClelland and Stewart) ISBN 0-7710-9564-3
- The Dolphin's Tooth; A Decade in Search of Adventure (2005 McClelland and Stewart) ISBN 0-7710-9566-X
- Blue Sky Kingdom; An Epic Family Journey to the Heart of the Himalaya (2020 Douglas & McIntyre) ISBN 1771622695

== Awards ==
- TORGI Best Non-Fiction Talking Book of the Year; 2000
- Banff Mountain Book Festival, Best Adventure Travel Book Shortlist; 2000, 2005
- National Magazine Awards; Silver 2006, 2007; Honourable Mention, 2004, 2006, 2007, 2008
- "Top 100 Canadians To Watch in New Millennium", The Globe and Mail, 1999
- Banff Mountain Book Festival, Jury Member, 2012, 2013

== Television and film ==
Kirkby hosted the CBC primetime adventure reality series, No Opportunity Wasted (2007).

Three of his expeditions have been featured in National Geographic Documentaries

- Above All Else: The Everest Dream (1999)
- Assignment: Blue Nile (2000)
- Off the Map: Crossing the Empty Quarter (2001)

Kirkby was featured in the National Geographic Channel documentary Through the Lens (2003), and provided commentary for OLN (Outdoor Life Network) "Twenty Five Most Dangerous Places."

Kirkby has a television show on Travel Channel named Big Crazy Family Adventure. The show follows Kirkby and his family, wife Christine and their two sons Bodi and Taj, as they travel from British Columbia to Ladakh, India, by many modes of transportation except planes.
