= Pat's Uninteresting Tours =

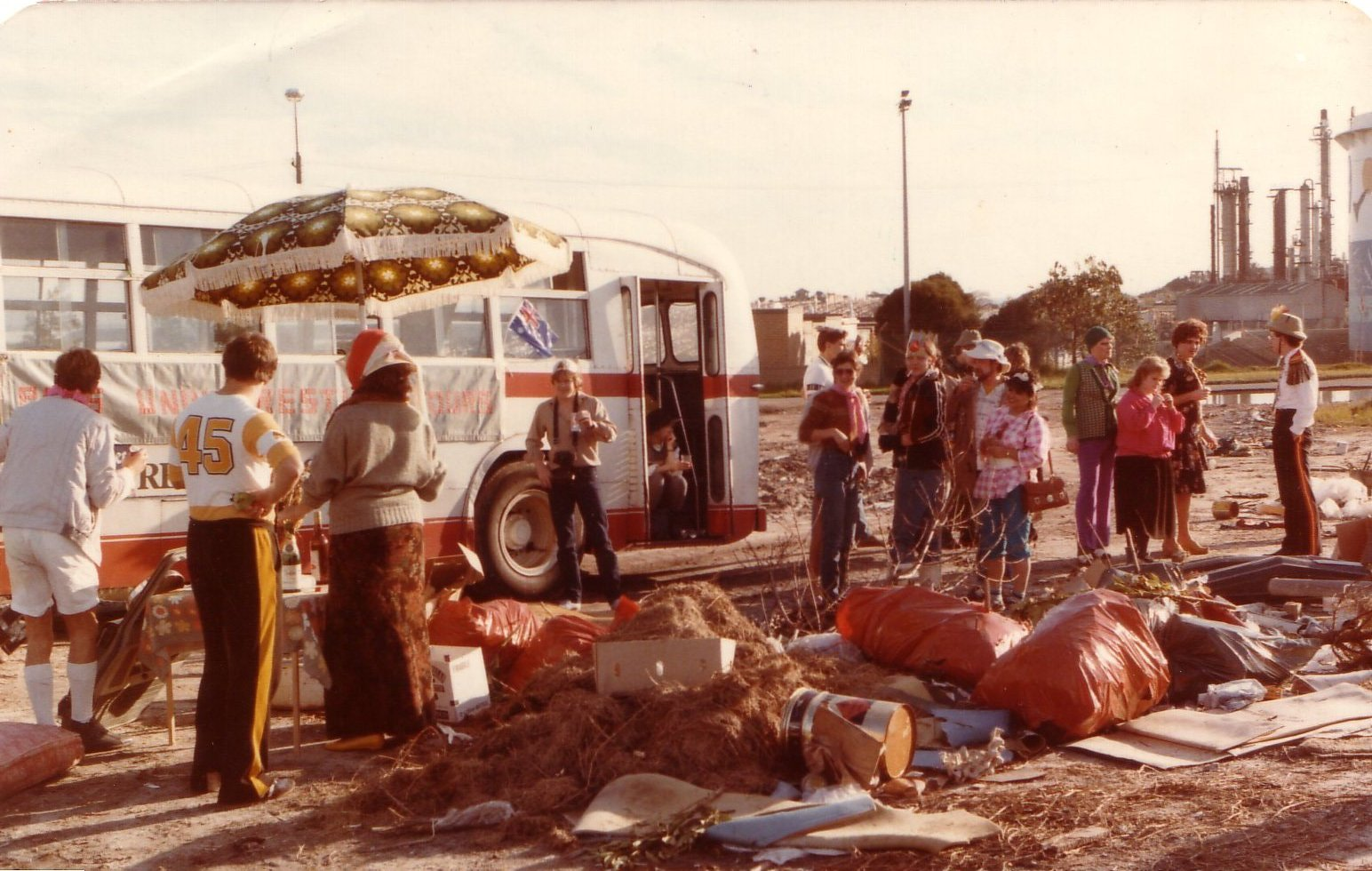
Tourists onboard "Pat's Uninteresting Tours" enjoy wine tasting at the rubbish tip in 1986

Pat's Uninteresting Tours was a series of themed route bus tours that offered an alternative to the usual sightseeing tours. Taking passengers on a four-hour comedy excursion to downmarket locations it operated in Sydney, Australia during the mid to late 1980s.

The premise was to conduct paying passengers on a bus and expose them to ordinary situations in incongruous contexts - actively avoiding normal tourist attractions and visiting uninteresting sites. These included wine tasting at a rubbish tip, "experiencing fresh air" at the sewage works and formal dinner at a road-side diner. Passengers were encouraged to dress in tourist garb for the day tours and tacky evening wear for night tours. After TV New Zealand program That's Fairly Interesting recorded a segment, tours were conducted in Wellington, Christchurch, Palmerston North and later Auckland.

== Beginnings ==
Patrick McGeown created the concept in 1978 whilst serving on board the Royal Australian Navy warship HMAS Perth. After repeated trips to Hawaii, he began to lead alternative sightseeing events for other crewmates. Following the inaugural tour he then conducted tours in Darwin and Canberra before launching the concept as a business in Sydney on 17 March 1985.

== Destinations ==
Each tour was unique and the four hours of improvisation and creativity took passengers to an assortment of locations. Some Sydney locations were:

- Various industry by day/night
- Eastern Suburbs Crematorium
- Long Bay Gaol
- Malabar Sewerage Treatment Works
- Kings Cross red light district to sing Christmas Carols at El Alamein Fountain
- Downmarket pub
- Rubbish tip
- Traffic roundabout
- Venereal Disease clinic
- Macdonaldtown railway station
- The city morgue
