= Big Crazy Family Adventure =

- Starring: Bruce Kirkby; Christine Pitkanen; Bodi Kirkby; Taj Kirkby
- Country of origin: United States
- Original language: English
- No. of seasons: 1
- No. of episodes: 9

Production
- Production locations: British Columbia, Canada
- Camera setup: Single-camera setup
- Running time: 60 minutes

Original release
- Network: Travel Channel
- Release: June 21 – August 9, 2015

Big Crazy Family Adventure follows the Kirkby family as they travel from British Columbia to Ladakh, India (more than 13,000 miles), by every mode of transportation except planes.

== Episodes ==
The reality show has one season with nine episodes. The original run goes from June 2015 to August 2015.

== Season 1 (2015) ==
No. overall	No. in season	Title	Original release date
1	1	"Leg 1: Storms, Stuffies and Unexpected Russians"	June 21, 2015
The first leg of the Kirkbys' 13,000-mile journey from their home in British Columbia to India involves paddling canoes, riding a train and taking a container ship to South Korea. Storms, life vests and a run-in with Russians create challenges.
2	2	"Leg 2: The DMZ, Scorpions and Peking Duck"	June 21, 2015
The Kirkby's second leg of their journey begins in Busan and involves a bullet train, sailing the Yellow Sea, and sprinting to Beijing. Moth larvae and bubbles add to the fun.
3	3	"Leg 3: Trains, a Wild Wall and Yaks at Altitude"	June 28, 2015
The third leg of the journey starts in Beijing, where they dine on Peking duck and walk along the Great Wall.
4	4	"Leg 4: Barley Beer, Everest and Expiring Visas"	July 5, 2015
The fourth leg continues in China and includes a 27-hour train ride, Mount Everest and meditation. They must race to reach the Tibetan border before their visas expire.
5	5	"Leg 5: Child Princess, Leaches and Chocolate Cake"	July 12, 2015
The fifth leg takes them to Nepal. They get to touch a Hindi goddess, bargain for presents and ride elephants. Chocolate cake and tigers create a birthday surprise.
6	6	"Leg 6: Sailing the Ganges, Lassis & Burning Ghats"	July 19, 2015
The sixth leg involves scorching heat on the Ganges River, sweet treats, snake charmers and the burning ghats. They race to make a train to the Taj Mahal.
7	7	"Leg 7: Swimming in Luxury, Beggars and Bollywood"	July 26, 2015
The seventh leg begins at the Taj Mahal and takes them to a 5-star hotel, a Bollywood dance class, a spice market and a rock and water filled adventure park.
8	8	"Leg 8: Toy Trains, Monkey Thieves and a Fever"	August 2, 2015
The eighth leg takes them 600 miles deeper into the Indian Himalayas. A narrow-gauge train, the Monkey Temple, a sudden fever and rockslides turn up the heat.
9	9	"Leg 9: The Final 100"	August 9, 2015
The final leg of this 13,000 mile journey, from British Columbia to a monastery where they will live for three months in Ladakh, India, has them trekking through 100 miles of rugged terrain to elevations of 16,700 feet.
