= Andrew Keoghan =

New Zealand musician and songwriter

- Born: 6 October 1980 (age 46); Antigua, West Indies
- Occupations: Musician and songwriter
- Years active: 2011–present
- Parent(s): Elizabeth "Beth" Keoghan; John Keoghan
- Relatives: Phil Keoghan (brother); Ruth Keoghan Cooper (sister)

Andrew Keoghan (born 6 October 1980) is a New Zealand musician and songwriter.

== Career ==
Keoghan was classically trained in singing. He also plays guitar and violin. His first album Arctic Tales Divide was released in New Zealand in 2011.

Keoghan's music has been described as a mixture of pop and folk-influenced art music.

On the album Arctic Tales Divide Keoghan experimented with a loop pedal to layer vocals, guitar, and occasionally violin. It was produced by Wayne Bell. The album was shortlisted for the 2012 Taite Music Prize.

In 2011 Keoghan toured New Zealand and Australia.

== Discography ==
Arctic Tales Divide (2011) (Brave Beluga). Published by Native Tongue Music Publishing Pty

== Family ==
Keoghan is the younger brother of Phil Keoghan, who is known for hosting The Amazing Race. Their parents, John and Elizabeth Keoghan, run a bed and breakfast in Rolleston, New Zealand.
