= Tough as Nails =

American reality competition show

- Genre: Reality competition
- Created by: Phil Keoghan; Louise Keoghan
- Presented by: Phil Keoghan
- Theme music composer: Andrew Keoghan
- Country of origin: United States
- Original language: English
- No. of seasons: 5
- No. of episodes: 50 (list of episodes)

Production
- Executive producers: Phil Keoghan; Louise Keoghan; Anthony Carbone
- Production companies: Tough House Productions; Raquel Productions; Muse Entertainment

Original release
- Network: CBS
- Release: July 8, 2020 – July 30, 2023

Tough as Nails is an American reality competition television series that aired on CBS from July 8, 2020, to July 30, 2023. The show is hosted by Phil Keoghan and features contestants competing in challenges at job sites that test their toughness, with one participant eliminated in each episode.

== Format ==
Twelve contestants are tested in competitions at real-world job sites with tasks that test their strength, endurance, life skills and mental toughness. Contestants compete in 6-on-6 team challenges, individual competitions, and elimination battles, referred to as 'Overtime'. Unlike other reality competitions, contestants who lose elimination challenges do not leave the game and still have the opportunity to win additional prizes during team competitions. Each team competition gives the winning team $12,000 ($2,000 per member) and earns the team that challenge's Badge of Honor. The team that has collected the most Badges of Honor by the end of the season receives an additional cash bonus of $60,000 ($10,000 per member). If both teams have the same number of Badges of Honor, then they will hold a tiebreaker.

In each episode, contestants compete in individual challenges in order to stay in the running for the grand prize. The lowest performers in each individual challenge are sent to Overtime, with the loser of the Overtime challenge eliminated from the individual competition (referred to in the show as 'punching out'). At the end of the season, one contestant is crowned the Tough as Nails champion and wins the grand prize of $200,000 and a Ford Super Duty truck.

== Production ==
On October 3, 2019, it was announced that CBS had ordered Tough as Nails with a 10-episode order. Phil Keoghan hosts the series and serves as executive producer alongside his wife, Louise. In early November, a nationwide casting search took place in the cities of St. Louis, Chicago, Detroit, New York City, Cincinnati, and Las Vegas. On April 29, 2020, it was announced that the series would premiere on July 8, 2020, later making it a two-hour premiere.

On August 12, 2020, the series was renewed for a second season, which premiered on February 10, 2021. On April 14, 2021, it was announced that the series was renewed for an additional two seasons, with the third season premiering on October 6, 2021. The series was later renewed for a fifth season on March 9, 2022. Starting with the fifth season, Canadians were eligible to apply for Tough as Nails. The fourth season premiered on January 4, 2023. The first four seasons filmed in Southern California, and the fifth season filmed in Hamilton, Ontario. On June 13, 2023, it was announced that the fifth season would premiere on July 2, 2023 with a two-hour premiere.

== Episodes ==
Season	Contestants	Episodes	Originally released		Winner	Runner-up
Season	Contestants	Episodes	First released	Last released	Winner	Runner-up
1	12	10	July 8, 2020	September 2, 2020	Kelly "Murph" Murphy	Danny Moody
2	12	10	February 10, 2021	April 14, 2021	Scott Henry	Cyril "Zeus" Ontai III
3	12	10	October 6, 2021	December 8, 2021	Lia Mort	Dequincey "Quincey" Walker
4	12	10	January 4, 2023	February 22, 2023	Jorge Zavala	Mister Frost
5	12	10	July 2, 2023	July 30, 2023	Ben Dempsey	Todd Anderson

== Reception ==
=== Critical response ===
Joel Keller from Decider said that the team challenges were more intriguing despite the individual challenges having more at stake. Andy Dehnart from Reality Blurred initially provided a mixed review of the first episode. However, by the second season, Dehnart had shifted to praising the show’s format, comparing it favorably to Survivor. Dehnart also later commended the show’s challenges.

=== Awards and nominations ===
Year	Award	Category	Nominee	Result	Ref.
2021	Critics' Choice Real TV Awards	Best Competition Series	Tough as Nails	Nominated	

== International versions ==
Country	Name	Host	Network	Ref.
Australia	TBA	TBA	TBA	
Belgium	De Sterkste Handen	Natalia & Sergio Quisquater	VTM	
Denmark	Danmarks Stærkeste Hænder	Mette Bluhme Rieck	DR1	
Netherlands	Tough as Nails Nederland	Jelka van Houten & Edson da Graça	Veronica TV & Amazon Prime Video	
