= Phil Keoghan =

New Zealand television personality (born 1967)

Phil Keoghan MNZM
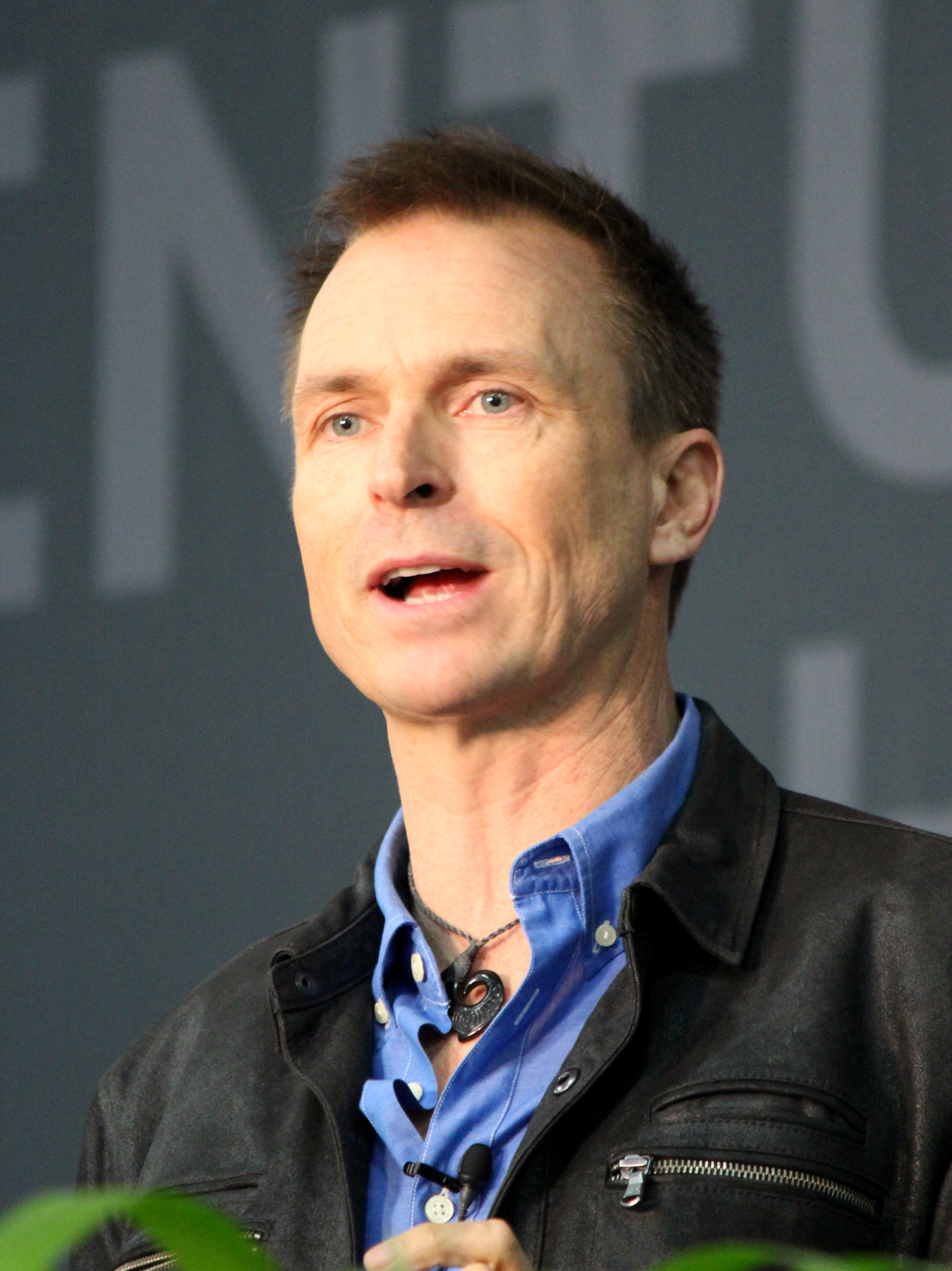
- Keoghan in February 2015
- Born: Philip John Keoghan; 31 May 1967 (age 59); Lincoln, New Zealand
- Occupation: Television presenter
- Years active: 1986–present
- Notable credit(s): The Amazing Race (CBS); No Opportunity Wasted (Discovery Channel); Explorer (National Geographic); Tough as Nails (CBS)
- Spouse: Louise Rodrigues
- Children: 1
- Relatives: Andrew Keoghan (brother)

Philip John Keoghan MNZM (/ˈkoʊɡən/ KOHG-ən; born 31 May 1967) is a New Zealand television presenter, best known for hosting the American version of The Amazing Race on CBS, since its 2001 debut. He is the creator and host of No Opportunity Wasted, which has been produced in the United States, New Zealand, and Canada. Keoghan also co-created and hosts the American reality competition programme Tough as Nails, which debuted on CBS on 8 July 2020. As of 2021, he has been involved with winning 10 Primetime Emmy Awards related to his work on The Amazing Race, where the show consecutively won the Outstanding Reality-Competition Program seven times.

== Early life ==
Keoghan was born on 31 May 1967, in Lincoln, a satellite town of Christchurch, New Zealand. He is the eldest of three children of John and Elizabeth "Beth" Keoghan. Owing to his father's career, Keoghan spent a considerable part of his childhood in Antigua and Canada. His family had returned to Christchurch by the time Keoghan was in high school, and following that, he attended St Andrew's College, Christchurch.

== Television ==
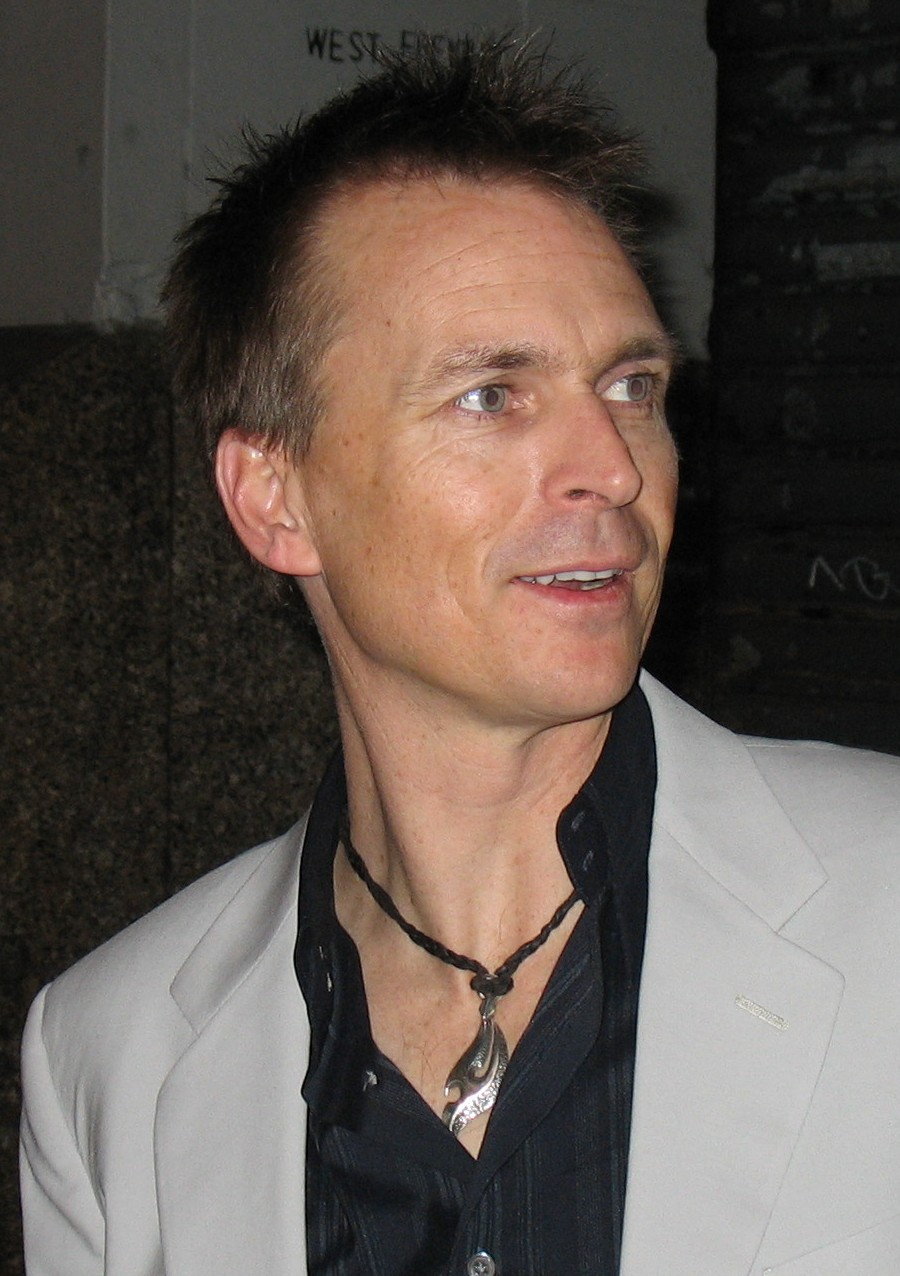
Keoghan in 2006

While completing a TV cameraman apprenticeship, Keoghan successfully auditioned for the New Zealand children's show Spot On in 1988. After a series of further presenter work in New Zealand television, including as a reporter on That's Fairly Interesting, he, at 23, and his wife Louise left for the United States after his show Keoghan's Heroes was picked up by an American network.

Keoghan originally auditioned for the host of Survivor. Though he made the shortlist, the CBS network ultimately chose Jeff Probst for Survivor, and offered Keoghan the hosting duties for The Amazing Race. Keoghan has been host for the show from its inception and also serves as a producer. He currently has a contract extending for "several years" following The Amazing Race 18 in 2011 that will allow him to also develop other shows for CBS. In a 2002 interview, Keoghan admitted that his pay for a single episode of The Amazing Race is more than an entire year on Spot On.

Shortly after the February 2011 Christchurch earthquake, Keoghan visited his hometown to ensure his family was safe but also to record segments for The Early Show to implore viewers to provide aid to the New Zealand Red Cross and to promote continued tourism, a fundamental part of New Zealand's economy, to the country. At the same time, he participated in recording Air New Zealand's new safety video for its domestic jet fleet. Keoghan has hosted over 1,000 different programme episodes.

In June 2010, it was announced that Keoghan would host and produce a new reality series about the Velux 5 Oceans Race.

Keoghan told TMZ in 2010 that during the 10th season of The Amazing Race he was detained in Ukraine for two days until the U.S. ambassador in Ukraine intervened to free him.

Keoghan hosted National Geographic Explorer starting in the show's 11th season, to start airing in 2018. According to Keoghan, he had wanted to produce for Explorer and he and his wife-to-be had even filmed and submitted a pitch tape to the show's production at that time.

== No Opportunity Wasted ==
While 19 and filming for Spot On, Keoghan and a partner dived down to the shipwreck of the MS Mikhail Lermontov, 120 feet (37 m) underwater. During filming, he was separated from his partner in the ship's ballroom and suffered a panic attack, considering it a near-death experience. He was rescued by his dive partner, and though shaken, insisted on facing his fear and returned the next day to complete filming. From then on, Keoghan set out to live his life to the fullest by accomplishing exotic goals and taking risks, creating a "No Opportunity Wasted" (NOW) list of activities he wanted to complete in his life; In his book No Opportunity Wasted, Keoghan wrote:

It was the first time I really stopped to think what dying could mean. I grabbed a pen and paper and wrote down all the things I had to do in life: hand-feed sharks, travel the world, climb Mt Everest, go into space.

— Phil Keoghan, No Opportunity Wasted, 2014.

Since then, Keoghan has broken a world bungee jumping record, gone diving in the world's longest underwater caves, eaten a meal on top of an erupting volcano, and renewed his vows underwater while feeding sharks. He was a guest on The Oprah Winfrey Show, where he shared with Oprah his list of things he wants to do before he dies.

Keoghan co-developed the television show No Opportunity Wasted, initially premiering in 2004, that reflected on this "No Opportunity Wasted" mantra. He also wrote a companion book, No Opportunity Wasted: 8 Ways to Create a List for the Life You Want.

== Cycling ==
Keoghan is an avid cyclist. From 28 March to 9 May 2009, Keoghan performed in "Ride Across America", in partnership with several organisations including GNC, to raise money for multiple sclerosis research. Keoghan and others biked 3,500 miles (5,600 km) from Los Angeles to New York City, averaging 100 miles (160 km) per day. Keoghan stopped in 39 cities en route, attending various events and participating in casting for season 15 of The Amazing Race; the ride culminated a day before the finale of season 14. The event raised $500,000, with over $400,000 coming from in-store donations during the ride. His documentary movie The Ride about his ride across America, premiered on 3 February 2011.

Keoghan later came across information about Harry Watson, an early-20th-century New Zealand cyclist that formed a team of four to become the first English-speaking team to ride in the Tour de France in 1928. Looking to celebrate Watson's legacy, Keoghan prepared to ride the same Tour de France course from 1928 (then, 22 legs at nearly 5,400 kilometres (3,400 miles) compared to the modern Tour at 3,500 kilometres (2,200 miles)), using the same type of gear-less bicycle as Watson and his team used, outside of using a modern riding seat. He and his riding partner Ben Cornell completed the ride in 2013, with their progress filmed by Keoghan's wife Louise and others. The footage was assembled for another film called Le Ride, which premiered in the Isaac Theatre Royal in Christchurch at the New Zealand Film Festival in July 2016.

== Personal life ==
Keoghan's father, John, was an agricultural scientist involved with conservation in New Zealand. He appeared alongside his son as a Pit Stop greeter during the 13th season of The Amazing Race when the racers stopped in New Zealand. John Keoghan and his wife, Beth, ran a bed and breakfast in Rolleston, New Zealand, prior to his death in November 2025.

Keoghan's brother Andrew was a television reporter on Television New Zealand's One News and is a jazz singer. His sister, Ruth Keoghan Cooper, specialises in coaching, training and development programmes for professional women who wish to combine careers with motherhood.

Keoghan currently lives with his wife and producing partner Louise Keoghan (née Rodrigues), and their daughter. Louise is an Australian-born television producer and director and co-creator of No Opportunity Wasted and Tough as Nails. They currently reside in Los Angeles, California. They also have homes in Matarangi on the Coromandel Peninsula, and in Westport.

== Awards ==
Keoghan was recognised in 2012 as one of six "Emerging Leaders" during the Sir Peter Blake Leadership Awards, due to his use of his celebrity status to support efforts such as Christchurch earthquake relief and efforts for multiple sclerosis.

In 2008, Keoghan was awarded the World Class New Zealand award in the 'Creative' category.

In the 2014 New Year Honours, Keoghan was appointed a Member of the New Zealand Order of Merit, for services as a television presenter and to tourism.

For his hosting of The Amazing Race, Keoghan was nominated for the 2009 Primetime Emmy Award for Outstanding Host for a Reality or Reality-Competition Program in the second year of the award's creation but lost to Jeff Probst of Survivor.

In 2018, Keoghan was inducted into the International Sports Hall of Fame.

Year	Award	Category	Work	Result
2003	Primetime Emmy Awards	Outstanding Reality Competition Program	The Amazing Race	Won
2004	Primetime Emmy Awards	Outstanding Reality Competition Program	The Amazing Race	Won
2005	Primetime Emmy Awards	Outstanding Reality Competition Program	The Amazing Race	Won
2006	Primetime Emmy Awards	Outstanding Reality Competition Program	The Amazing Race	Won
2007	Primetime Emmy Awards	Outstanding Reality Competition Program	The Amazing Race	Won
2008	Primetime Emmy Awards	Outstanding Reality Competition Program	The Amazing Race	Won
2009	Primetime Emmy Awards	Outstanding Reality Competition Program	The Amazing Race	Won
2009	Primetime Emmy Awards	Outstanding Host for a Reality or Reality Competition Program	The Amazing Race	Nominated
2010	Primetime Emmy Awards	Outstanding Host for a Reality or Reality Competition Program	The Amazing Race	Nominated
2010	Primetime Emmy Awards	Outstanding Reality Competition Program	The Amazing Race	Nominated
2011	Primetime Emmy Awards	Outstanding Reality Competition Program	The Amazing Race	Won
2011	Primetime Emmy Awards	Outstanding Host for a Reality or Reality Competition Program	The Amazing Race	Nominated
2012	Primetime Emmy Awards	Outstanding Host for a Reality or Reality Competition Program	The Amazing Race	Nominated
2012	Primetime Emmy Awards	Outstanding Reality Competition Program	The Amazing Race	Won
2013	Primetime Emmy Awards	Outstanding Reality Competition Program	The Amazing Race	Nominated
2014	Primetime Emmy Awards	Outstanding Reality Competition Program	The Amazing Race	Won
2015	Primetime Emmy Awards	Outstanding Reality Competition Program	The Amazing Race	Nominated
2016	Primetime Emmy Awards	Outstanding Reality Competition Program	The Amazing Race	Nominated
2017	Primetime Emmy Awards	Outstanding Reality Competition Program	The Amazing Race	Nominated
2018	Primetime Emmy Awards	Outstanding Reality Competition Program	The Amazing Race	Nominated
2019	Primetime Emmy Awards	Outstanding Reality Competition Program	The Amazing Race	Nominated
2021	Primetime Emmy Awards	Outstanding Reality Competition Program	The Amazing Race	Nominated
2022	Primetime Emmy Awards	Outstanding Reality Competition Program	The Amazing Race	Nominated
2023	Primetime Emmy Awards	Outstanding Reality Competition Program	The Amazing Race	Nominated
2024	Primetime Emmy Awards	Outstanding Reality Competition Program	The Amazing Race	Nominated
2025	Primetime Emmy Awards	Outstanding Reality Competition Program	The Amazing Race	Nominated

== Shows ==
Keoghan has worked in more than seventy countries as a television host, producer, writer, and cameraman. Some of the shows Keoghan has been involved with include:

- 3.45 Live (1990) – Presenter
- YaHoo (1991–1995) Host
- The Big Byte – Host
- The Amazing Race (2001–present) – Host
- Best of Both Worlds – Co-host
- Breakfast Time (FX TV series) – Road Warrior
- The Early Show – Travel correspondent
- FOX After Breakfast (1996) – Reporter
- That's Fairly Interesting – Reporter
- Go For It – Host
- The Human Edge (2002) – Co-creator
- Phil Keoghan's Adventure Crazy – Co-creator
- Adventure Crazy – Host
- Keoghan's Heroes – Co-creator
- Miss World 2003 (2003) – Host
- No Opportunity Wasted (2004) – Host
- Spot On – Host
- Surprise, Surprise – Host
- Whose House Is It Anyway? (2000) – Host
- Speed Test Drive (2006) – Cameo appearance as a student of the Jim Russell Racing School
- Everest: After the Climb (2007) – Host
- CBS News Sunday Morning (2008) – Contributor
- Star Trek: Phase II (2008) – Cameo as Admiral Keoghan in "Blood & Fire" Part One
- Million Dollar Password (2008) – Guest appearance/Himself
- I Get That a Lot (2013) – Himself
- Big Brother (2015) – Takeover guest who revealed The Amazing Race 26 alums Jeff and Jackie as the final two HouseGuests.
- Earth Live (2017) – Co-host with Jane Lynch
- American Dad! (2017) – Guest voice as host of "The Bitchin' Race" in the episode "The Bitchin' Race"
- National Geographic Explorer (2018) – Host
- Tough as Nails (2020–2023) – Host, Executive producer, Director, Co-creator
- Secret Celebrity Renovation (2023) – Himself
- Hollywood Squares (2025) – Himself
- Let's Make a Deal (2025) – Himself
- Hacks (2026) – Himself in the episode "D'Amazing Race"

== See also ==
- List of New Zealand television personalities
