= My Boy (Marlon Williams album) =

2022 album by Marlon Williams

Studio album by Marlon Williams
- Released: 9 September 2022
- Genre: New Romantic
- Length: 35:30
- Label: Universal Music New Zealand; Virgin Music Australia; Dead Oceans
- Producer: Marlon Williams; Tom Healy

Marlon Williams chronology
Plastic Bouquet (2020)	My Boy (2022)	Te Whare Tīwekaweka (2025)

Singles from My Boy
- 1. "My Boy" Released: 3 May 2022; 2. "Thinking of Nina" Released: 16 June 2022; 3. "River Rival" Released: 13 July 2022; 4. "Easy Does It" Released: 11 August 2022; 5. "Don't Go Back" Released: 7 September 2022

My Boy is the third solo studio album by New Zealand musician Marlon Williams. The album debuted at number one on the Official New Zealand Music Chart.

== Production ==
After the break-up themed Make Way for Love (2018), Williams decided to create a more playful record. In order to distance himself from his pre-established sound and image, Williams worked with a new musical team for My Boy.

The song "Thinking of Nina" is written about the character Nina Sergeevna from the drama series The Americans. The final track of the album is a cover of Barbra Streisand's 1981 single "Promises", which was written by Barry and Robin Gibb of the BeeGees.

== Release and promotion ==
The first single released from the album was "My Boy", in May 2022. The following month, Williams announced the release of the album, paired with the release of the album's second single "Thinking of Nina". Williams toured Europe as an opening act for Lorde's Solar Power Tour in May and June, during which the pair performed songs from Lorde's EP Te Ao Mārama, sung in Māori.

Williams' next singles from the album were "River Rival", released in July, "Easy Does It" in August, and "Don't Go Back", which was released two days before the album. Williams embarked on the My Boy Tour in January 2023, performing four dates across New Zealand.

My Boy was one of ten finalists for the 2023 Taite Music Prize.

== Track listing ==
My Boy track listing
No.	Title	Writer(s)	Length
1.	"My Boy"	Marlon Williams	2:43
2.	"Easy Does It"	Williams	3:39
3.	"River Rival"	Williams	2:32
4.	"My Heart the Wormhole"	Williams	3:05
5.	"Princes Walk"	Williams	3:23
6.	"Don't Go Back"	Mark Perkins; Williams	3:11
7.	"Soft Boys Make the Grade"	Williams	3:26
8.	"Thinking of Nina"	Williams	3:16
9.	"Morning Crystals"	Williams	3:15
10.	"Trips"	Williams	3:09
11.	"Promises"	Barry Gibb; Robin Gibb	3:51
Total length:			35:30

== Credits and personnel ==
- Cass Basil – background vocalist (1–3, 6–8, 10–11), bass (1–11), piano (7)
- Delaney Davidson – lap steel guitar (2)
- Elroy Finn – drums (1, 6)
- Hollie Fullbrook – background vocalist (6, 8), cello (10)
- Bary Gibb – lyrics (11), composition (11)
- Robin Gibb – lyrics (11), composition (11)
- Tom Healy – background vocalist (1, 6), baritone guitar (7), drum machine (6, 9), drum programming (3, 10), electric guitar (1–6, 8), engineer (1–11), lap steel guitar (3, 5, 9–10), mixing (1–11), piano (3), percussion (10), producer (1–11), synthesizer (3–5, 7, 11)
- Heba Kadry – mastering engineer
- Dave Khan – mellotron (2, 7), synthesizer (6), viola (2) violin (2, 6–7)
- Mark Perkins – additional production (1, 3–4), background vocalist (1), composer (6), drum programming (3), lyricist (6), synthesizer (3–4)
- Paul Taylor – background vocalist (1), drums (2–5, 7–9, 11), percussion (1–9, 11), timpani (11)
- Marlon Williams – acoustic guitar (2, 5, 7–9), composer (1–10), electric guitar (3, 5, 7–8), keyboards (1), lyricist (1–10), marimba (5), mellotron (4–5, 8–9, 11), nylon-string guitar (1–2, 4, 6, 9, 11), percussion (9–10), piano (5, 9–11), producer (1–11), synthesizer (3–4, 6–7, 10), wurlitzer organ (8), vocals (1–11)

== Charts ==
=== Weekly charts ===
Weekly chart performance for My Boy
Chart (2022)	Peak position
Australian Albums (ARIA)	10
New Zealand Albums (RMNZ)	1

=== Year-end charts ===
Year-end chart performance for My Boy
Chart (2022)	Position
New Zealand Artist Albums (RMNZ)	14

== Release history ==
Release dates and formats for My Boy
Region	Date	Format(s)	Label(s)	Ref.
Various	9 September 2022	CD; vinyl; digital download; streaming	Universal Music New Zealand; Virgin Music Australia; Dead Oceans	
Japan	14 September 2022	CD	Ultra-Vybe	
