= Marlon Williams: Ngā Ao E Rua – Two Worlds =

2025 New Zealand documentary film

Marlon Williams: Ngā Ao E Rua - Two Worlds
- Directed by: Ursula Grace Williams
- Produced by: Alexander Behse
- Starring: Marlon Williams
- Cinematography: Tim Flower
- Edited by: Josh Young
- Music by: Mark Perkin
- Production company: Monsoon Pictures International
- Distributed by: Madman Entertainment
- Release date: 1 May 2025
- Running time: 93 minutes
- Country: New Zealand
- Languages: English, Māori
- Box office: $135,620

Marlon Williams: Ngā Ao E Rua – Two Worlds is a 2025 New Zealand documentary film directed by Ursula Grace Williams. The film documents musician Marlon Williams's four-year journey to record Te Whare Tīwekaweka, his first album entirely in te reo Māori (the Māori language).

== Synopsis ==
Singer-songwriter Marlon Williams prepares to record his first album entirely in the Māori language with songs he took four years to write while reconnecting with the language of his cultural heritage.

== Cast ==
- Marlon Williams
- Ella Yelich-O'Connor (Lorde)
- Hannah Harding
- Kommi Tamati-Ellife
- Delaney Davidson
- Alastair Burns
- Ben Woolley
- Mark Perkins
- Tom Lynch
- Gus Agars
- Dave Khan
- Jenny Rendall
- David Williams

== Production ==
Marlon Williams: Ngā Ao E Rua – Two Worlds was produced by Alexander Behse, with associate producers Alastair Burns, Ursula Grace Williams, Marlon Williams, James Borrowdale, and John Harris. The film is a co-production between Monsoon Pictures International and Revival Pictures Production. It was financed by the New Zealand Film Commission, NZ On Air, and Te Māngai Pāho, with additional support from the Screen Canterbury NZ Production Grant.

Production featured extensive collaboration with Marlon's touring band The Yarra Benders, co-producer Mark Perkins, the He Waka Kōtuia singers, and guest artist Lorde. It was filmed over four years as Marlon created his first te reo Māori album, Te Whare Tīwekaweka. The project was shot across international tours, recording sessions, and at Marlon's home in Lyttelton.

== Release ==
Marlon Williams: Ngā Ao E Rua – Two Worlds had its world premiere in Tāmakai Makarau, Auckland, on 29 April 2025.

It was released theatrically nationwide in New Zealand on 1 May 2025 by Madman Entertainment. That same month, it was among the New Zealand titles presented by the New Zealand Film Commission at the Cannes Film Market.

It subsequently screened at festivals across Australia including Sydney Film Festival in June 2025, Revelation Perth International Film Festival in July 2025, and Melbourne International Film Festival in August 2025.

== Reception ==
Coco Lance of RNZ described Marlon Williams: Ngā Ao E Rua – Two Worlds as "an intimate and evocative portrait" of Marlon's journey to reclaim his reo (language) and deepen his connection to te ao Māori (Māori culture). Lance praised director Ursula Grace Williams for capturing both "the scope of [Marlon's] international career" and "the personal vulnerability of his cultural reclamation," highlighting "tender moments with his family, collaborators, and co-writer KOMMI." She noted that the film's four-year chronicle offers "a moving depiction of identity, heritage, and artistic growth" with the potential to inspire indigenous audiences worldwide.

Alex Casey of The Spinoff lauded the film as "a brave, essential and joyous film that couldn’t have arrived at a better time", highlighting its grounded, humorous, and visually rich portrayal of Marlon's four-year journey to create his first te reo Māori album, Te Whare Tīwekaweka. She noted that director Williams balances intimate family moments, the beauty of Aotearoa's landscapes, and the political context of te reo Māori revitalisation, concluding that the film feels like "quietly witnessing a piece of history."
