= 2026 Aotearoa Music Awards =

New Zealand music award ceremony

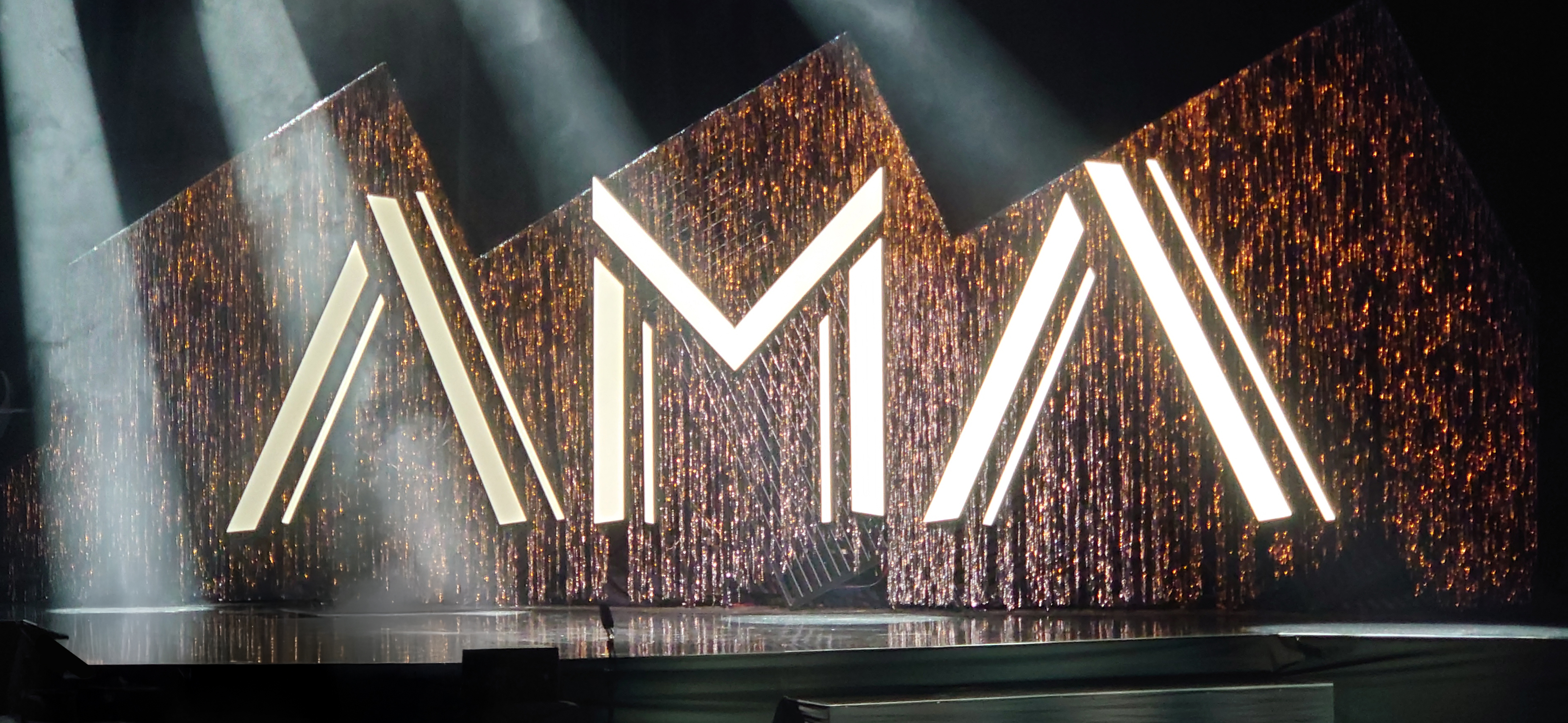
- The stage at the 2024 awards ceremony
- Awarded for: Excellence in New Zealand music
- Date: 28 May 2026
- Location: Civic Theatre
- Presented by: Recorded Music NZ
- Reward: Tūī trophy
- Website: Official website

Television/radio coverage
- Network: Radio NZ

The 2026 Aotearoa Music Awards is the annual ceremony featuring awards for New Zealand music recording artists. The ceremony took take place on 28 May 2026 at the Civic Theatre in Auckland.

The awards were streamed live by Radio New Zealand.

== Nominees and winners ==
The finalists for the awards were announced on 16 April 2026. Marlon Williams, who lead the nominations with seven, won three awards on the night, and made history when Te Whare Tīwekaweka became the first entirely te reo Māori album to win Album of the Year.

Winners are listed first, highlighted in boldface, and indicated with a double dagger (‡).

Album of the Year Te Tino Pukaemi o te Tau	Single of the Year Te Tino Waiata Tōtahi o te Tau
**Marlon Williams – Te Whare Tīwekaweka**‡; Geneva AM – Pikipiki; Kaylee Bell – Cowboy Up; Ladi6 – Le Vā; Lorde – Virgin; MĀ – Blame it on the Weather; Mokomokai – PONO; Reb Fountain – How Love Bends; Tami Neilson – Neon Cowgirl; The Beths – Straight Line Was a Lie; Tom Scott – ANITYA; Troy Kingi – Troy Kingi Presents: Night Lords	**Marlon Williams – "Aua Atu Rā"**‡; Alien Weaponry – "Mau Moko"; Fazerdaze – "Motorway"; Hori Shaw, Te Wehi – "Ready To Ride"; Ladi6 – "LightBulb"; Lorde – "What Was That"; Paige – "twenties"; Tami Neilson – "Neon Cowgirl" (feat. Neil Finn); The Beths – "Metal"; The Phoenix Foundation – "Vampire Class"; There's A Tuesday – "Margo"; Tom Scott – "till then"
Best Solo Artist Te Tino Reo o te Tau	Best Group Te Tino Kāhui Manu Taki o te Tau
**Marlon Williams – Te Whare Tīwekaweka**‡; Geneva AM – Pikipiki; Ladi6 – Le Vā; Lorde – Virgin; Tami Neilson – Neon Cowgirl; Tom Scott – ANITYA	**The Beths – Straight Line Was A Lie**‡; Alien Weaponry – Te Rā; Dick Move – Dream, Believe, Achieve; Mokomokai – PONO; Phoebe Rings – Aseurai; Ringlets – The Lord Is My German Shepherd (Time for Walkies)
International Achievement Tohu Tutuki o te Ao	Te Manu Mātarae
**Lorde**‡	**Balu Brigada**‡
Best Māori Artist Te Manu Taki Māori o te Tau	Mana Reo Te Māngai Pāho Mana Reo
**TAWAZ – various**‡; Hori Shaw – various; MĀ – Blame It On The Weather; Marlon Williams – Te Whare Tīwekaweka; Te Wehi – various	**Stan Walker – "Mō Āke Tonu" (feat. Hana-Rāwhiti Maipi-Clarke)**‡; Hamo Dell – "Tā Roha"; Marlon Williams – "Te Whare Tīwekaweka"; MOHI – "Ka Rea" (feat. Pare); Nikau Grace – "He Aha Te Aha" (feat. Te Kapa Haka o Ngāti Whakaue); Rob Ruha, Troy Kingi, Kaylee Bell – "Matariki Hunga Nui"
Breakthrough Artist of the Year Te Iti Rearea o te Tau	Best Alternative Artist Te Manu Taki Whanokē o te Tau
**Te Wehi**‡	**MĀ – Blame It On The Weather**‡; Grecco Romank – Arts Colony; Phoebe Rings – Aseurai
Best Classical Artist Te Manu Taki Tuauki o te Tau	Best Country Artist Te Manu Taki Tuawhenua o te Tau
**Michael Norris – Rerenga**‡; Jade String Quartet, Anthony Ritchie – Melencolia; Moth Quartet – Tundra	**Tami Neilson – Neon Cowgirl**‡; Jenny Mitchell – Forest House; Kaylee Bell – Cowboy Up
Best Electronic Artist Te Manu Taki Tāhiko o te Tau	Best Folk Artist Te Manu Taki Ahurea o te Tau
**Caru, Brandn Shiraz – Back 2 Back**‡; Geneva AM – Pikipiki; Sanoi – Augenblick: Side A	**Ny Oh – Wildwood**‡; Mel Parsons – various; Nadia Reid – Enter Now Brightness
Best Hip Hop Artist Te Manu Taki Ātete o te Tau	Best Jazz Artist (Te Kaipuoro Tautito Toa)
**Mokomai – PONO**‡; Diggy Dupé, choicevaughan – Brown Velvet; Troy Kingi – Troy Kingi Presents: Night Lords	**Louisa Williamson – Groundwork**‡; Clear Path Ensemble – Black Sand; Darren Pickering Small Worlds – Three
Best Pop Artist Te Manu Taki Arotini o te Tau	Best Rock / Metal Artist Te Manu Taki Rakapioi / Rakatū Pāorooro o te Tau
**Lorde – Virgin**‡; Benee – Ur an Angel I'm Just Particles; Borderline – Chrysalis	**Alien Weaponry – Te Rā**‡; Beastwars – The Ship // The Sea; Dick Move – Dream, Believe, Achieve
Best Roots Artist Te Manu Taki Taketake o te Tau	Best Soul / RnB Artist Te Manu Taki Manako o te Tau
**Te Wehi – various**‡; Hori Shaw – various; Three Houses Down – Lovers Roots	**Tom Scott – ANITYA**‡; A.R.T – Blank Canvas; Sam V – Take A Chance On V: Deluxe

=== Artisan awards ===
Best Album Artwork Te Taumata o te Toi	Best Music Video Content Te Taumata o te Ataata
**Nick Keller – The Ship // The Sea (Beastwars)**‡; Elliot O'Donnell, Jamie Robertson – New Tomorrows (Sola Rosa); Laura Williams – ANITYA (Tom Scott)	**Stella Reid – "Scared Old Men" (Dick Move)**‡; Stan Walker, Abe Mora – "Mō Āke Tonu" (Stan Walker feat. Hana-Rāwhiti Maipi-Clarke); Tom Grut – "Ed’s Sun" (Aidan Fine)
Best Producer Te Taumata o te Kaiwhakaputa	Best Engineer Te Taumata o te Pūkenga Oro
**Ben Lawson – ANITYA (Tom Scott)**‡; Leroy Clampitt – various (Lily Allen); Marlon Williams, Mark Perkins – Te Whare Tīwekaweka (Marlon Williams)	**Mark Perkins – Te Whare Tīwekaweka (Marlon Williams)**‡; Ben Lawson – ANITYA (Tom Scott); James Goldsmith – The Ship // The Sea (Beastwars)

=== Other awards ===
Highest Selling Artist Te Taumata o te Hokona	Radio Airplay Record of the Year Te Taumata o te Horapa
**Six60**‡	**Riiki Reid** – "Over Romantic"‡
People's Choice Tā te Iwi	Aotearoa Charts Icon
**Borderline**‡	**Fat Freddy's Drop**‡
New Zealand Music Hall of Fame Te Whare Taonga Puoro o Aotearoa
**Ché Fu**‡
