= 2020 Aotearoa Music Awards =

New Zealand music award ceremony

- Awarded for: Excellence in New Zealand music
- Date: 15 November 2020
- Location: Spark Arena
- Country: New Zealand
- Presented by: Recorded Music NZ
- Reward: Tūī Award trophy
- Website: http://www.nzmusicawards.co.nz

Television/radio coverage
- Network: Three; The Edge TV

The 2020 Aotearoa Music Awards was the 54th holding of the annual ceremony, featuring awards for musical recording artists based in or originating from New Zealand. It took place on 15 November 2020 at Spark Arena in Auckland and was hosted by Jesse Mulligan, Sharyn Casey, and Jayden King.

The awards show was broadcast live nationally on The Edge TV from 7pm until 8:30pm, and Three from 8:30pm until 10:30pm.

Previously known as the New Zealand Music Awards, the awards were rebranded in 2020 as the Aotearoa Music Awards.

== Nominees and winners ==
Finalists for the awards were announced 8 October, 2020.

Winners are listed first and highlighted in boldface.

Album of the Year Te Pukaemi o te Tau	Single of the Year Te Waiata Tōtahi o te Tau
**The Beths – Jump Rope Gazers**; L.A.B. – L.A.B. III; Reb Fountain – Reb Fountain; Six60 – Six60; Tami Neilson - Chickaboom!	**BENEE – "Supalonely"**; Drax Project featuring Six60 – "Catching Feelings"; Jawsh 685 – "Savage Love"; Six60 – "Please Don't Go"; Troy Kingi – "All Your Ships Have Sailed"
Best Group Te Roopu Toa	Breakthrough Artist of the Year Te Kaituhura Puoro Toa o te Tau
**The Beths – Jump Rope Gazers**; L.A.B. – L.A.B. III; Miss June – Bad Luck Party; Six60 – Six60	**Jawsh 685**; CHAII; MELODOWNZ; Paige
Best Solo Artist Te Kaipuoro Takitahi Toa	Best Māori Artist Te Māngai Pāho Te Kaipuoro Māori Toa
**BENEE – Stella & Steve**; JessB – New Views; Nadia Reid – Out of My Province; Reb Fountain - Reb Fountain	**Maimoa**; Ria Hall; Stan Walker
Best Pop Artist Te Kaipuoro Arotini Toa	Best Alternative Artist Te Kaipuoro Manohi Toa
**BENEE**; Paige; Six60	**The Beths**; Mermaidens; Reb Fountain
Best Soul / RnB Artist Te Kaipuoro Awe Toa	Best Hip Hop Artist Te Kaipuoro Hipihope Toa
**Haz & Miloux**; Lepani; Stan Walker	**Church & AP**; Choicevaughan; Raiza Biza
Best Roots Artist Te Kaipuoro Taketake Toa	Te Māngai Pāho Mana Reo Award
**L.A.B.**; Lomez Brown; Ria Hall	**Mōhau**; Maimoa; Six60
Best Electronic Artist Te Kaipuoro Tāhiko Toa	Best Rock Artist Te Kaipuoro Rakapioi Toa
**Lee Mvtthews**; State of Mind; Truth	**City of Souls**; Devilskin; Villainy
Best Worship Artist Te Kaipuoro Kairangi Toa	Best Classical Artist Te Kaipuoro Inamata Toa
**Mōhau**; Kane Adams; Te Rautini	**Andrew Beer & Sarah Watkins**; Klara Kollektiv; Matthew Marshall
Peoples' Choice Award Te Kōwhiri o te Nuinga	Recorded Music NZ Legacy Award Tohu Whakareretanga
**L.A.B.**	**Johnny Cooper**; **Max Merritt**; **Peter Rosa, Dinah Lee**; **The Chicks and Larry's Rebels**
Highest selling Artist Te Toa Hoko Teitei	NZ On Air Radio Airplay Record of the Year Te Rikoata Marakerake o te Tau
No finalists were announced in this category.: **Drax Project featuring Six60**	No finalists were announced in this category.: **Drax Project**
Recorded Music NZ International Achievement Tohu Tutuki o te Ao	Best Folk Artist Te Kaipuoro Taketake Toa
No finalists were announced in this category.: **BENEE**; **Jawsh 685**	**Mel Parsons – Glass Heart**; Victoria Vigenser & Lindsay Martin – The Gap; Paper Cranes – Voices
Best Pacific Music Album Te Pukaemi Toa o Te Moana Nui a Kiwa	Best Country Artist Te Kaipuoro Tuawhenua Toa
**Olivia Foa’i – Candid**; Church & AP – Teeth; POETIK – HAMOFIED 2 EP	**Delaney Davidson & Barry Saunders – Word Gets Around**; Katie Thompson – Bittersweet; Kendall Elise – Red Earth
Best Jazz Artist Te Kaipuoro Tautito Toa	Best Children's Artist Te Kaipuoro Waiata Tamariki Toa
**Dixon Nacey – The Edge of Chaos**; ALCHEMY – ALCHEMY; Michal Martyniuk – Resonate	**Anika Moa – Songs For Bubbas 3**; Captain Festus McBoyle; Chris Sanders
Massey University Best Producer Te Kaiwhakaputa Toa	Best Engineer Te Kaipukaha Toa
**Josh Fountain**	**Simon Gooding - Reb Fountain by Reb Fountain**
NZ On Air Best Music Video Te Puoro Ataata Toa	Best Album Artwork Te Toi Ataata Pukaemi Toa
**Anahera Parata - Bunga by SWIDT**	**Lily Paris West - Look Me In They Eye by Mermaiden**
Recorded Music NZ Manager of the Year Kaiwhakahaere Puoro o te Tau
**Paul McKessar from CRS Management** (award returned)
