= Kingmaker (Tami Neilson album) =

2022 album by Tami Neilson

Studio album by Tami Neilson
- Released: 15 July 2022
- Recorded: Roundhead Studios
- Genre: Country; blues
- Length: 32:13
- Label: Neilson Records; Southbound
- Producer: Tami Neilson

Tami Neilson chronology
Chickaboom! (2020)	Kingmaker (2022)

Singles from Kingmaker
- 1. "Beyond the Stars" Released: 14 April 2022; 2. "Baby You're a Gun" Released: 12 May 2022; 3. "Careless Woman" Released: 15 June 2022; 4. "Kingmaker" Released: 15 July 2022

Kingmaker is the eighth studio album by Canadian-New Zealand country singer Tami Neilson, released in July 2022. The album debuted at number one on the Official New Zealand Music Chart.

== Production ==
Neilson was disheartened after the COVID-19 pandemic in New Zealand stalled the promotion of her previous album Chickaboom! (2020), and was uninspired to write music in 2020. Writing for Kingmaker began in early 2021, and took six months. The album was primarily inspired by Neilson's experiences as an Indigenous woman in the music industry, and she wanted to write an album that had a "cinematic arc", similar to a film soundtrack. Sonically, the album was inspired by Nancy & Lee (1968) and the subsequent music released by Nancy Sinatra and Lee Hazlewood, as well as musicians Ennio Morricone and Bobbie Gentry.

The song "Beyond the Stars" was written together with Delaney Davidson, with both musicians expressing mourning for their fathers. Neilson was scheduled to perform at the Luck Reunion festival in Texas in March 2020, however the festival was cancelled and a livestream was released in its place. American country musician Willie Nelson and his family were watching the concert, which led to Neilson developing a friendship with Nelson's wife Annie D'Angelo, and led to Nelson being a featured vocalist on the song.

The album was recorded in a week at Neil Finn's Roundhead Studios in Auckland.

== Release and promotion ==
The first single released from the album was "Beyond the Stars", featuring American country musician Willie Nelson in April 2022. This was followed by "Baby You're a Gun" in May, "Careless Woman" in June and "Kingmaker" in July.

== Critical reception ==
At the 2022 Aotearoa Music Awards, won the awards for Best Country Artist, Best Solo Artist and Best Producer for her work on Kingmaker. 2022 was the sixth time Neilson had won the Best Country Artist award, and Neilson's Best Producer award was the first time the award had been given to a woman since Bic Runga won the award in 2006 for her album Birds (2005).

The album was longlisted for the 2023 Polaris Music Prize.

== Track listing ==
Kingmaker track listing
No.	Title	Writer(s)	Length
1.	"Kingmaker"	T Neilson	2:28
2.	"Careless Woman"	T Neilson	1:50
3.	"Baby, You're a Gun"	J Neilson; T Neilson	3:29
4.	"King of Country Music"	T Neilson	3:06
5.	"Beyond the Stars" (featuring Willie Nelson)	D Davidson; T Neilson	3:20
6.	"Green Peaches"	J Neilson; T Neilson	3:26
7.	"Mama's Talkin'"	T Neilson	2:31
8.	"I Can Forget"	R Neilson; T Neilson	3:18
9.	"The Grudge"	T Neilson	4:42
10.	"Ain't My Job"	T Neilson	4:03
Total length:			32:13

== Credits and personnel ==
- Vanessa Abernethy – choir
- Brett Adams – guitar
- Miranda Adams – 1st violin
- Robert Ashworth – viola
- Nick Atkinson – clarinet, saxophone
- Sophia Bayly – photography
- Christine Bowie – viola
- Tom Broome – drums, percussion
- Ashley Brown – cello
- Steve Chadie – engineer (5)
- Chris Chetland – mastering
- Diana Cochrane – 2nd violin
- Anna Coddington – choir
- Alex Corbett – assistant engineer
- Julia Deans – choir
- David Garner – cello
- Simon Gooding – mixing engineer
- Gordon Hill – double bass
- Bella Kalolo-Suraj – choir
- Victoria Kelly – string arrangements
- Chip Matthews – bass
- Maria Francesca Melis – artwork
- Charlie Neilson – backing vocals (4)
- Sam Neilson – backing vocals (4)
- Tami Neilson – liner notes, producer, vocals
- Willie Nelson – vocals (5)
- Liu-Yi Retallick – 1st violin
- Neil Watson – pedal steel guitar
- Yanghe Yu – 2nd violin

== Charts ==
=== Weekly charts ===
Weekly chart performance for Kingmaker
Chart (2022)	Peak position
New Zealand Albums (RMNZ)	1

=== Year-end charts ===
Year-end chart performance for Kingmaker
Chart (2022)	Position
New Zealand Artist Albums (RMNZ)	20

== Release history ==
Release dates and formats for Kingmaker
Region	Date	Format(s)	Label(s)	Ref.
New Zealand	15 July 2022	CD; vinyl; digital download; streaming	Neilson Records, Southbound	
