= Te Whare Tīwekaweka =

Studio album by Marlon Williams
- Released: 4 April 2025
- Studios: Okuru Hall; Te Ra Studios; The Cabin; Roundhead Studios
- Genres: Country, folk, rock and roll, pop, kapa haka
- Length: 38:54
- Label: Universal Music New Zealand
- Producers: Marlon Williams; Mark Perkins

Marlon Williams chronology
| My Boy (2022) | Te Whare Tīwekaweka (2025) |

Singles from Te Whare Tīwekaweka
- 1. "Aua Atu Rā" Released: 22 January 2025; 2. "Kāhore He Manu E" Released: 25 February 2025; 3. "Rere Mai Ngā Rau" Released: 19 March 2025

Te Whare Tīwekaweka (lit. 'The Messy House') is the fourth studio album by Marlon Williams. It is Williams' first album to be sung entirely in te reo Māori, representing part of his five-year journey to reclaim his ability in the language. The album features the Yarra Benders, long-time collaborators and touring band of Williams, as well as a range of other New Zealand artists including Lorde and Lyttelton-based KOMMI, the latter of whom was heavily involved in the album and supporting Williams with te reo Māori.

As with Williams' earlier work, the album traverses a range of genres, having been variously described as country, rock, folk, and reminiscent of early Māori showband music. The album deals with largely personal themes, including his own relationship with his own Māori roots and te ao Māori (the Māori world) as a whole, as well as returning to his home of Lyttelton. However, critics also noted the indirect political nature of the release against the backdrop of policies from the sixth National Government of New Zealand that sought to wind back the prevalence of te reo Māori or otherwise strained Māori-crown relations in New Zealand.

The album reached number one on the New Zealand charts, and has been received positively by critics, winning album of the year at the 2026 Aotearoa Music Awards. Individual songs have also seen success, with four tracks from the album charting and "Whakameatia Mai" being awarded New Zealand Country Song of the Year in 2026. Williams' journey to create the album was also documented in the film Marlon Williams: Ngā Ao E Rua – Two Worlds, which was released soon after the album.

== Background ==
Although Williams is Māori himself (affiliating to Kai Tahu and Ngāi Tai ki Tōrere) and attended kohanga reo (a Māori language preschool) as a young child, he had largely lost his understanding of Māori during his school years and had little proficiency in it prior to recording Te Whare Tīwekaweka. Despite this, Williams still regularly sang Māori music, describing "a joy and a naturalness" to those songs regardless of his fluency and prompting him to consider writing a full album in te reo. Work on that idea, which eventually become Te Whare Tīwekaweka, began in May 2019 with Williams writing the melody and structure of "Aua Atu Rā". Williams soon realised similarities with his melody and traditional forms of Māori music, and began to explore writing lyrics in te reo Māori to the track, despite his limited proficiency with that language. At the time, the incomplete song was shelved in favour of what would become My Boy.

Later, Williams returned from Melbourne, where he had been living since 2013, to his hometown of Lyttelton as a result of the COVID-19 pandemic. The pandemic allowed him to reconnect with Māori culture and language, along with his own upbringing. Having lost his understanding of te reo Māori at a young age, Williams described the struggle of having to relearn the language and the shame from that process contributing to a sense of disconnect from his Māori ancestry. Towards the end of the tour supporting My Boy, Williams again began to reconsider the concept of an album entirely in Māori. At the time, Williams had considered scrapping the idea of the album, due to the charged political environment around the use of Māori. His return from Melbourne had put him in the same circles as Kommi Tamati-Elliffe, a fellow artist from Lyttelton and lecturer of Māori studies at the University of Canterbury who performs witch hop in Māori under the name KOMMI. Tamati-Elliffe supported Williams in his use of Māori, correcting grammar and phrasing to help finalise the writing of "Aua Atu Rā". Williams ultimately decided to proceed with the album, spurred on by the production of a documentary about its creation.

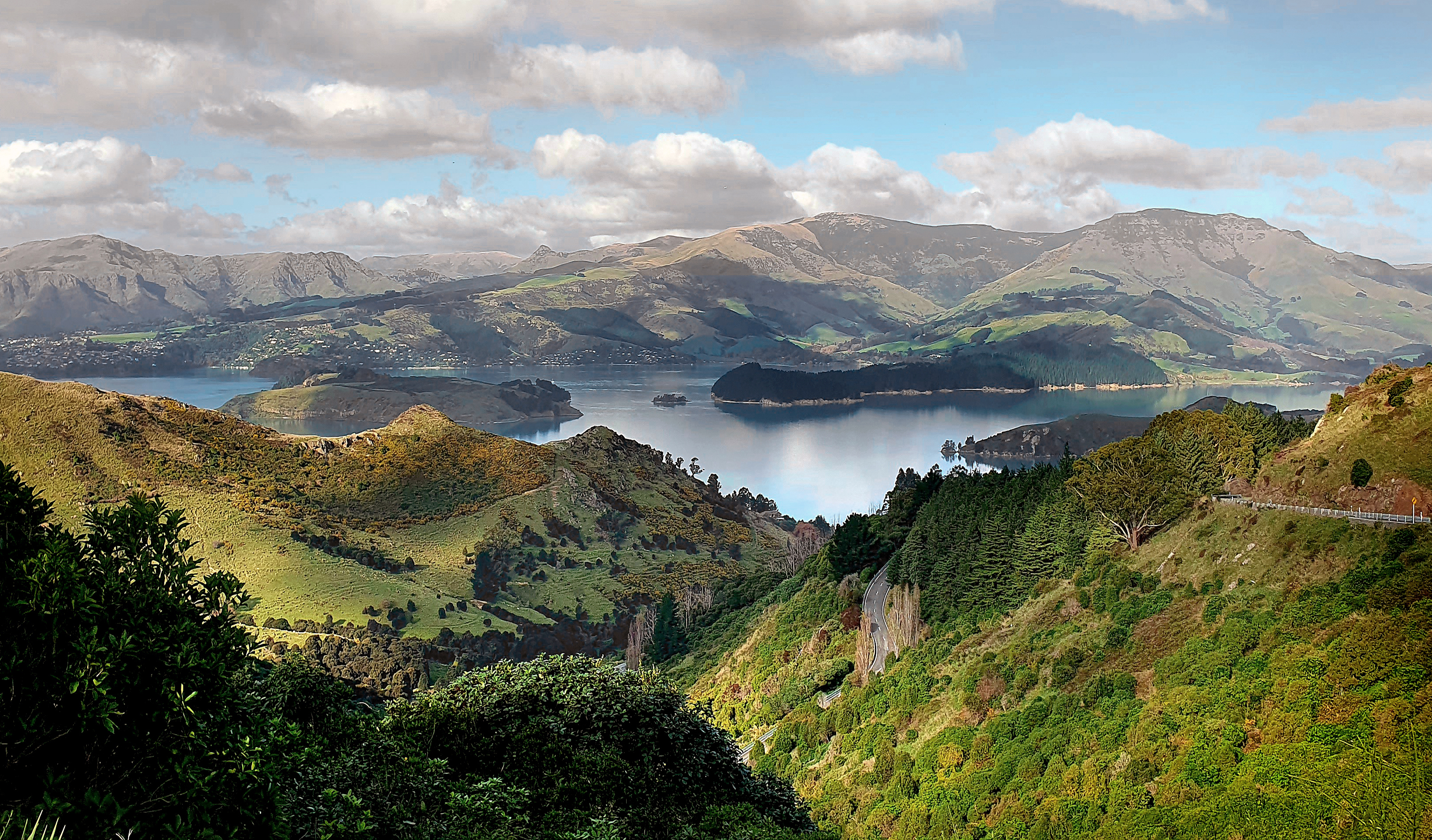
Lyttelton Harbour / Whakaraupō, where Williams wrote and recorded portions of the album

== Writing and production ==
Although work on Te Whare Tīwekaweka took place over a period of roughly five years, it did not pick up in earnest until after the release of My Boy. Williams had initially struggled with writing tracks for the album, before the decision to record the album entirely in te reo Māori helped to foster his creativity and gave him new means to communicate his ideas, likening the shift to adopting a new instrument. The whakataukī (Māori proverb) "ko te reo Māori, he matapihi ki te ao Māori" (the Māori language is a window to the Māori world) helped to drive Williams' work on the album, as did a quote from Hirini Melbourne that "if you can't say it in four lines, forget about it!" To embody these and help correct what Williams termed his "pidgin Māori", he increased his collaboration with Kommi Tamati-Elliffe, who became a co-writer for much of the album and whose vocals would feature on the track "Huri Te Whenua". The exact dynamic of this relationship varied between songs, with both Williams and Tamati-Elliffe writing some songs largely on their own, and collaborating more on others.

In addition to Tamati-Elliffe, Williams enlisted the help of his long-time touring band The Yarra Benders and Dunedin-based kapa haka group He Waka Kōtuia to record the album. Several other musicians also contributed to the album, including country music artist Delaney Davidson and Mark Perkins, who performs under the name Merk and co-produced the album with Williams. The track "Kāhore He Manu E" features a duet with Lorde, who had previously recorded her own Māori-language EP Te Ao Mārama on which Williams had appeared. Recording took place in a range of locations across New Zealand, including Neil Finn's Roundhead Studios, Te Rā Studios in Diamond Harbour near Lyttelton, and Okuru Hall to the south of Haast on New Zealand's West Coast. The production of the album was documented by the director Ursula Grace Williams through the film Marlon Williams: Ngā Ao E Rua – Two Worlds, which followed Marlon Williams throughout the four year process of creating the album. The documentary was released on 1 May 2025, soon after the release of Te Whare Tīwekaweka, and was met with positive reviews.

== Composition and lyrics ==
As with other albums from Williams, Te Whare Tīwekaweka covers a wide range of genres, including country, blue-eyed soul, bluegrass, folk, and rock and roll. Unlike previous releases however, these are blended with influences from Māori musical traditions. Tracks such as "Whakameatia Mai" echo Williams' earlier work and country influences but make use of cadences prominent in Māori music, while "Kuru Pounamu" is a ballad which makes use of strings during the opening. The first single, "Aue Atu Rā", features a pedal steel guitar and Māori strums reminiscent of the Māori showbands of the 1960s, which is blended with musical elements that evoke doo-wop and Tin Pan Alley. Influences from te ao Māori are more apparent on some tracks: the a cappella opening track "E Mawehe Ana Au" echoes a karanga (welcome call), while "Korero Māori" is similar to the action songs common in kapa haka.

Lyrically, the album is often described as Williams' most personal to date. Themes around identity and the perception of being caught between the Māori and Pākehā worlds are prevalent on the album. The latter of these is most apparent on the opening track, in which Williams sings of being "split between two worlds – sitting here, looking there" as "the chasm grows wider." Similarly, "Korero Māori" plays on a double meaning of its title (with the title translating as both "speak in Māori" and "speak plainly") to talk of a person returning to their home after travelling the world, and "Me Uaua Kē" is about having ancestral and familial connections to a place. Elsewhere, themes of heartbreak and love are more apparent, as on "Kei Te Mārama" and "Kāhore E Manu E" respectively. Metaphors also play a large role within the lyrics: "Aua Atu Rā" uses a tale of being adrift in a boat to convey isolation and loneliness, while "Whakameatia Mai" describes violent storms and earthquakes to convey disruptions and uncertainty before resolving to acceptance with the title acting as a refrain.

Although the album does not explicitly cover political themes, the juxtaposition of the album's release against the political environment within New Zealand at the time was often seen as an inherently political statement. The album's release came in the wake of large nationwide protests against proposed legislation that would have reinterpreted the Treaty of Waitangi, as well as a range of other decisions from the incumbent right-wing coalition government that were seen to erode the position of Māori and the Māori language within New Zealand. Against this backdrop, the decision to release a record entirely in te reo Māori was seen as a powerful and pointed statement, with one review stating that the record "shows that such attacks will ultimately fail, as the impulse to make art that reflects who and what we are is stronger than any ideologue's agenda."

== Packaging and title ==
The album's name translates from Māori as the messy house, which Williams has said represents his limited level of fluency in te reo Māori on the album. The title has also been used to describe the result of the blended musical traditions and range of genres on the album, as well as a wider allusion to place the album within contemporary New Zealand society.

The cover art for the album features a painting by Williams' mother, artist Jennifer Rendall, which she had painted while pregnant with Williams. The artwork depicts a tall figure in a top hat walking towards a house at night. On seeing the painting again as an adult, Williams had initially assumed it was a painting of him, owing to the similar proportions between himself and the figure. This likeness is apparent in the video for "Aua Atu Rā", in which Williams dresses in the same outfit as the figure on the cover.

== Release and reception ==
Professional ratings
Review scores
| Source | Rating |
|---|---|
| AllMusic | 4/5 stars |
| Clash | 9/10 |
| Libel Music | 4.5/5 stars |
| Mojo | 4/5 stars |
| Narc | 3.5/5 stars |
| Radio New Zealand | 5/5 stars |
| Record Collector | 3/5 stars |
| Rolling Stone Australia / New Zealand | 4.5/5 stars |
| Uncut | 7/10 |

Williams announced Te Whare Tīwekaweka on 22 January 2025, alongside the release of debut single "Aua Atu Rā". The single spent two weeks in the New Zealand singles charts, reaching a peak position of 19 on the Hot 40 Singles and 4 on the Hot 20 Aotearoa Singles. Two more singles, "Kāhore He Manu E" and "Rere Mai Ngā Rau", followed in February and March, although neither charted prior to the release of the album. Te Whare Tīwekaweka debuted at the number one position on the New Zealand Top 40 Albums charts upon its release, making it Williams' third album to debut at number one and the first full Māori-language album in New Zealand history to do so. The album's release also resulted in four tracks from it charting that week. Te Whare Tīwekaweka would go on to spend 22 weeks in the New Zealand charts, and one week on the Australian charts at number 28.

Te Whare Tīwekaweka received largely positive reviews from critics. Irina Shtreis for Mojo said that the use of Māori resulted in "a record so euphoric and emotionally direct that understanding the words is not a prerequisite," while Sarah Downs described it as "a stunning ode to love, life, and connection" in Rolling Stone Australia / New Zealand. Other critics spoke of the album's importance for New Zealand, with Umusic reviewer Kristi Illingworth saying that the album "will resonate to each future generation born into the home which is this sacred Aotearoa", and Nick Bollinger writing for Radio New Zealand that "for New Zealanders, whether Māori or Pakeha, mono or multilingual, it is something even more special. Like all modern music it is a hybrid, blending elements of country, folk, pop and rock'n'roll, yet it is one that could only come from here, and it's for all of us." Rolling Stone Australia / New Zealand ranked it as the best New Zealand album of 2025, while Double J rated it the 7th best album of 2025.

Since its release, Te Whare Tīwekaweka has received numerous accolades. In April 2026, Williams won the Taite Music Prize for the album, which recognises the best New Zealand album of the previous year. At the 2026 Aotearoa Music Awards, Te Whare Tīwekaweka won Album of the Year, Williams himself won Best Solo Artist, and Mark Perkins won Best Engineer for his work on the album. This recognition also extended to tracks from the album, with "Aua Atu Rā" winning Single of the Year at the Aotearoa Music Awards and an APRA Silver Scroll. Also in May 2026, "Whakameatia Mai" was awarded the title of Best Country Song at the 2026 Country Music Honours in Gore.

== Track listing ==
All tracks are written by Marlon Williams and Kommi Tamati-Elliffe except for Pōkaia Rā te Marama, which was written by Williams and Julian Wilcox.

Side one
| No. | Title | Length |
|---|---|---|
| 1. | "E Mawehe Ana Au" | 1:39 |
| 2. | "Kei Te Mārama" | 3:04 |
| 3. | "Aua Atu Rā" | 3:04 |
| 4. | "Me Uaua Kē" | 3:13 |
| 5. | "Korero Māori" | 2:19 |
| 6. | "Ko Tēnā Ua" | 2:36 |
| 7. | "Whakameatia Mai" | 2:04 |

Side two
| No. | Title | Length |
|---|---|---|
| 1. | "Ngā Ara Aroha" | 3:50 |
| 2. | "Huri Te Whenua" (Featuring KOMMI) | 2:19 |
| 3. | "Kuru Pounamu" | 3:09 |
| 4. | "Kāhore He Manu E" (Featuring Lorde) | 2:21 |
| 5. | "Pānaki" | 3:07 |
| 6. | "Rere Mai Ngā Rau" | 2:42 |
| 7. | "Pōkaia Rā Te Marama" | 4:14 |
| Total length: | | 38:54 |

== Personnel ==
Personnel taken from liner notes for Te Whare Tīwekaweka.

- Marlon Williams – vocals, guitar, synthesisers, percussion, piano, backing vocals, snaps, eBow

The Yarra Benders

- Gus Agars – Drums, tambourine, backing vocals, mandolin, percussion, snaps
- Dave Khan – Guitar, synthesisers, backing vocals, violin, viola, snaps
- Ben Woolley – Bass, backing vocals, upright bass, snaps

Additional performers

- He Waka Kotūia – Vocals
- Rangimāria Waiatārere – Backing vocal
- Ryan Chin – Pedal steel guitar, backing vocals
- Delaney Davidson – Backing vocals, Guitar
- Mark Perkins – Synthesisers, guitar, organ, percussion, bass, piano, wurlitzer
- Josh Young – Backing vocals
- Darren Pickering – Piano, wurlitzer
- KOMMI – Vocals (track 9), backing vocals, snaps
- Lorde – Vocals (track 11)
- Ray Suen – Pedal steel guitar

Technical

- Marlon Williams – production
- Mark Perkins – production, mixing, engineering
- Ryan Chin – assistant engineering
- Alex Harmer – assistant engineering
- Heba Kadry – mastering
- Tim Brott – Field recording

== Charts ==
| Chart (2025) | Peak position |
|---|---|
| Australian Albums (ARIA) | 28 |
| New Zealand Albums (RMNZ) | 1 |
