= Marlon Williams (album) =

Studio album by Marlon Williams
- Released: 19 February 2016
- Studio: The Sitting Room, Lyttelton Harbour, Christchurch
- Genre: Rock
- Length: 34:15
- Label: Caroline Australia
- Producer: Ben Edwards

Marlon Williams chronology
| Marlon Williams (2016) | Make Way for Love (2018) |

Professional ratings
Aggregate scores
| Source | Rating |
|---|---|
| Metacritic | 76/100 |
Review scores
| Source | Rating |
| AllMusic | 3.5/5 stars |
| Blurt Magazine | 4/5 stars |
| Drowned in Sound | (8/10) |

Marlon Williams is the solo debut self-titled studio album by New Zealand musician Marlon Williams. It was released on 19 February 2016 under Caroline Australia.

== Track listing ==
All tracks composed by Marlon Williams; except where noted.

| No. | Title | Writer(s) | Length |
|---|---|---|---|
| 1. | "Hello Miss Lonesome" | | 3:15 |
| 2. | "After All" | Marlon Williams, Delaney Davidson | 3:11 |
| 3. | "Dark Child" | Marlon Williams, Tim Moore | 5:23 |
| 4. | "I'm Lost Without You" | Teddy Randazzo, Billy Barberis | 5:15 |
| 5. | "Lonely Side of Her" | | 2:24 |
| 6. | "Silent Passage" | Bob Carpenter | 3:06 |
| 7. | "Strange Things" | | 3:03 |
| 8. | "When I Was a Young Girl" | Traditional; arranged by Marlon Williams | 5:51 |
| 9. | "Everyone's Got Something to Say" | | 2:47 |

== Personnel ==
- Marlon Williams - vocals, acoustic guitar, electric guitar on "After All" and "I'm Lost Without You", synthesizer on "I'm Lost Without You"
- Ben Woolley - bass guitar, backing vocals
- AJ Park - drums
- Aldous Harding - backing vocals on "Hello Miss Lonesome", "Lonely Side of Her", "Silent Passage", "Strange Things" and "Everyone's Got Something to Say"
- Aaron Tokona - acoustic and electric guitar on Hello Miss Lonesome"
- Joe McCallum - drums on "Silent Passage"
- Rang Lloyd - electric guitar on "Dark Child"
- Simon Gregory - electric guitar on "I'm Lost Without You"
- John Egenes - pedal steel on "Silent Passage"
- Ben Edwards - synthesizer on "Dark Child" and "Strange Things"
- Anita Clark - violin on "Strange Things"
- Mikey Somerfield - violin on "I'm Lost Without You" and "Silent Passage"
- Ben Brown - backing vocals on "Everyone Got Something to Say"
- David Williams - backing vocals on "After All"

== Charts ==
| Chart (2015/16) | Peak position |
|---|---|
| Australian Albums (ARIA) | 31 |
| Belgian Albums (Ultratop Flanders) | 100 |
| Dutch Albums (Album Top 100) | 66 |
| New Zealand Albums (RMNZ) | 7 |
