= Chickaboom! =

2020 album by Tami Neilson

Studio album by Tami Neilson
- Released: 14 February 2020
- Studio: The Lab (Auckland)
- Genre: Country; rockabilly
- Length: 28:13
- Label: Neilson (independent); Outside Music
- Producer: Delaney Davidson; Tami Neilson

Tami Neilson chronology
Sassafrass! (2018)	Chickaboom! (2020)	Kingmaker (2022)

Singles from Chickaboom!
- 1. "Hey Bus Driver!" Released: 6 September 2019; 2. "Any Fool with a Heart" Released: 18 October 2019; 3. "Ten Tonne Truck" Released: 15 November 2019; 4. "You Were Mine" Released: 15 January 2020; 5. "Queenie, Queenie" Released: 14 February 2020

Chickaboom! is the seventh studio album by Canadian-New Zealand country singer Tami Neilson, released on 14 February 2020, by Neilson Records and Outside Music. A country album inspired by rockabilly, Chickaboom! was nominated for the Juno Award for Contemporary Roots Album of the Year and Aotearoa Music Award for Album of the Year at the 2020 Aotearoa Music Awards. The album debuted at number eight on the Official New Zealand Music Chart.

== Production ==
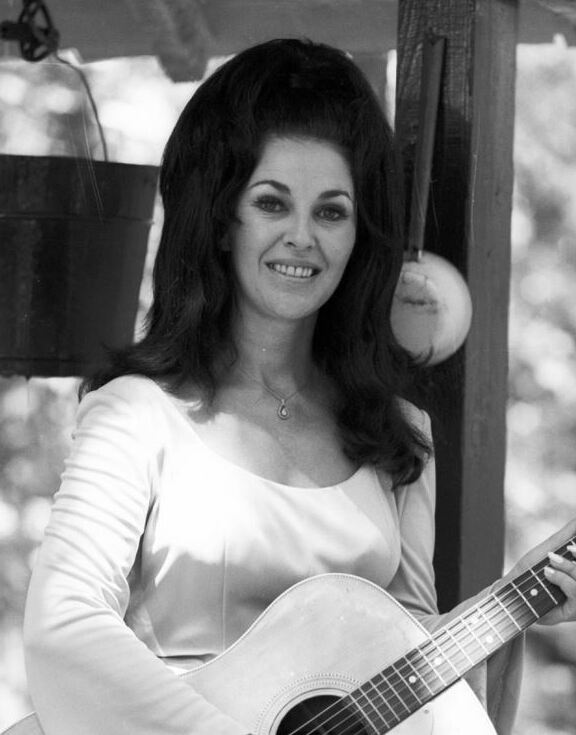
Neilson was inspired by rockabilly musicians such as Wanda Jackson on the album.

Neilson was inspired by a rockabilly and country sound for the album, reminiscent of Johnny Cash and Wanda Jackson. Many of the songs in the album are inspired by Neilson's struggles in the music industry and gender inequality. Neilson chose the album's title to express the sound of rockabilly and artists on Sun Records, and to evoke a feeling that the songs would "pop and explode".

The album featured a stripped-back instrumentalisation compared to her previous album Sassafrass!, in part to be more easily able to replicate the album's sound in live performances. Neilson produced the album herself and wrote or co-wrote every song on the album excluding the album's closer, "Sleep", which was written by New Zealand country musician Delaney Davidson. Neilson's brother Jay Neilson was a major contributor to the project, performing guitars and appearing as a featured artist on the singles "Hey, Bus Driver!" and "Any Fool with a Heart".

The song "Sister Mavis" was written as a tribute to singer Mavis Staples. Neilson's sons provided accompanying vocals for Neilson on the song "Queenie, Queenie".

== Release and promotion ==
"Hey Bus Driver!" featuring Neilson's brother Jay Neilson was released as the lead single from the album in September 2019. Together the pair released Neilson's next single "Any Fool with a Heart" in October, followed by "Ten Tonne Truck" in November, "You Were Mine" in January 2020 and "Queenie, Queenie" in February. A music video was produced for "You Were Mine" and was intended to be released in January, however, due to the severity of the 2019–20 Australian bushfire season, Neilson and her team shelved the video, due to it containing scenes of a fiery blaze.

Owing to the effects of the COVID-19 pandemic, Neilson was unable to tour in 2020. Instead, she focused on creating a YouTube series, The Tami Show, with her brother Jay. On 19 February 2021, the album was re-released as a deluxe edition, featuring a five song concert recorded at Roundhead Studios for Radio New Zealand recorded with her band and the Big Boss Orchestra.

== Reception ==
On review aggregator Metacritic, Chickaboom! received a score of 84 out of 100 based on four reviews, indicating "universal acclaim". Kyle Mullin of Exclaim! praised the album, feeling that the cut-down band (compared to her large-scale backing in Sassafrass! "lets Neilson's outsized voice take center stage, exactly where it belongs". Jim Hynes called "You Were Mine" the album's stand-out track, describing it as "a cross between Screamin' Jay Hawkins and early Mavis with her explosive vocals". Rich Wilhelm of Pop Matters described Neilson as "the heiress apparent to legendary rockabilly/country queen Wanda Jackson".

The album was nominated for the Aotearoa Music Award for Album of the Year at the 2020 Aotearoa Music Awards, and for the Juno Award for Contemporary Roots Album of the Year in 2021, The album's lead single "Hey Bus Driver!" won the APRA award for Best Country Song at the 2020 Country Music Awards in New Zealand.

== Track listing ==
Chickaboom! track listing
No.	Title	Writer(s)	Length
1.	"Call Your Mama"	D Davidson; T Neilson	2:27
2.	"Hey, Bus Driver!" (featuring Jay Neilson)	J Neilson; T Neilson	2:13
3.	"Ten Tonne Truck"	T Neilson	2:22
4.	"Queenie, Queenie"	T Neilson	2:09
5.	"You Were Mine"	J Neilson; T Neilson	3:43
6.	"16 Miles of Chain"	D Davidson; T Neilson	3:29
7.	"Tell Me That You Love Me"	D Davidson; T Neilson	2:03
8.	"Any Fool with a Heart" (featuring Jay Neilson)	T Neilson	2:43
9.	"Sister Mavis"	T Neilson	2:44
10.	"Sleep"	D Davidson	2:20
Total length:			28:13

Chickaboom! Deluxe track listing
No.	Title	Writer(s)	Length
11.	"Walk (Back to Your Arms) (Live for RNZ @ Roundhead)"	T Neilson; J Neilson	3:11
12.	"Roimata (Cry Myself to Sleep) (Live for RNZ @ Roundhead)" (featuring Troy Kingi)	T Neilson; Tīmoti Kāretu; Tama Waipara	3:11
13.	"A Woman's Pain (Live for RNZ @ Roundhead)"	T Neilson	3:04
14.	"Call Your Mama (Live for RNZ @ Roundhead)"	D Davidson; T Neilson	2:30
15.	"You Were Mine (Live for RNZ @ Roundhead)"	J Neilson; T Neilson	3:45
Total length:			43:59

== Credits and personnel ==
- Brett Adams – lead guitar (5)
- Charlie – guest vocals (4)
- Chris Chetland – mastering
- Delaney Davidson – lead guitar, guest vocals (7), production
- Jules Koblun – artwork design
- Sabin Holloway – photography (cover)
- Joe McCallum – drums, percussion
- Jol Mulholland – mixing
- Jay Neilson – bass guitar, rhythm guitar, vocals
- Tami Neilson – rhythm guitar, producer, vocals
- Todd Neilson – photography (stills)
- Graham Reid – liner notes
- Sam – guest vocals (4)

== Charts ==
Weekly chart performance for Chickaboom!
Chart (2020)	Peak position
New Zealand Albums (RMNZ)	8

== Release history ==
Release dates and formats for Chickaboom!
Region	Date	Edition	Format(s)	Label(s)	Ref.
Various	14 February 2020	Standard	CD; vinyl; digital download; streaming	Neilson (independent); Outside Music	
Various	19 February 2021	Deluxe	Digital download; streaming	Neilson (independent); Outside Music	
