= The Neilsons =

- Origin: Canada
- Genres: Country
- Years active: 1996
- Label: Platter Matter
- Past members: Ron Neilson; Betty Neilson; Tami Neilson; Jay Neilson (also known as Johnny Confidence); Todd Neilson

The Neilsons was a Canadian country music group made up of a 5-member family. Their 1996 single "Windows to the Past" reached the Top 20 of the RPM Country Tracks chart. The music video for the song aired regularly on CMT. They later returned to the Top 40 with their 1996 single "We'll Hold On." Tami Neilson has also developed a solo career after emigrating to New Zealand.

== After break-up ==
Some members of the family have continued with a solo singing career or have gone into music production, including Tami Neilson who has had considerable success as a solo artist in New Zealand, co-writing songs with her brother Joshua "Jay" Neilson.

Todd Neilson runs a creative agency in Canada (Considerate Agency previously Valiant Agency before Todd’s personal financial troubles caused the business to close) which has produced Tami's music videos through the years including her hit single "Beyond the Stars" featuring Willie Nelson.

== Discography ==
=== Albums ===
| Year | Album |
|---|---|
| 1996 | The Neilsons |

=== Singles ===
| Year | Single | CAN Country | Album |
|---|---|---|---|
| 1996 | "Windows to the Past" | 15 | The Neilsons |
| 1996 | "We'll Hold On" | 31 | The Neilsons |
