= Sassafrass! =

2018 album by Tami Neilson

Studio album by Tami Neilson
- Released: 1 June 2018
- Genre: Country; rockabilly
- Label: Neilson Records; Outside Music
- Producer: Ben Edwards, Tami Neilson

Tami Neilson chronology
Songs of Sinners Live (2017)	Sassafrass! (2018)	Chickaboom! (2020)

Singles from Sassafrass!
- 1. "Stay Outta My Business" Released: 23 March 2018; 2. "Manitoba Sunrise at Motel 6" Released: 18 May 2018; 3. "Devil in a Dress" Released: 4 July 2018

Sassafrass! is the sixth studio album by Canadian-New Zealand country singer Tami Neilson, released in June 2018.

== Production ==
The album was inspired by Neilson's experiences of becoming a mother, losing her father and turning 40. She felt that the album expressed her "coming into confidence as a woman" and is a celebration of her newly-found freedom. Because of this, many of the songs on the album focused on gender equality. Sonically, Neilson was inspired by musicians including Sister Rosetta Tharpe, Big Mama Thornton and Mavis Staples. The song "Miss Jones" was written as a tribute to Sharon Jones.

The album's title, Sassafrass!, is a slang term referring to a self-assured person.

== Release and promotion ==
Three singles were released from the album: "Stay Outta My Business" in March 2018, "Manitoba Sunrise at Motel 6" in May and "Devil in a Dress" in July, a month after the album's release.

== Reception ==
At the 2018 New Zealand Music Awards, Sassafrass! was nominated for the Album of the Year award, and led to Neilson being nominated for the Best Solo Artist award.

== Track listing ==
Sassafrass! track listing
No.	Title	Writer(s)	Length
1.	"Stay Outta My Business"	J. Neilson; T. Neilson	2:56
2.	"Bananas"	J. Neilson; T. Neilson	2:32
3.	"Diamond Ring"	T. Neilson	3:12
4.	"A Woman's Pain"	T. Neilson	2:57
5.	"Devil in a Dress"	J. Neilson; T. Neilson	3:07
6.	"One Thought of You"	R. Neilson; T. Neilson	2:16
7.	"Miss Jones"	T. Neilson	2:30
8.	"Smoking Gun"	J. Neilson; T. Neilson	3:42
9.	"Kitty Cat"	T. Neilson	2:03
10.	"Manitoba Sunrise at Motel"	T. Neilson	4:21
11.	"Good Man"	T. Neilson	5:23
Total length:			24:59

== Credits and personnel ==
- Brett Adams – guitar
- Chris Chetland – mastering
- Ashley Church – photography
- Anita Clark – strings
- Georgie Clifford – backing vocals
- Sarena Close – backing vocals
- Reuben Derrick – horns
- Ben Edwards – co-producer, mixing engineer
- Natalee Fisher – hair, make-up
- Mike Hall – bass
- Nyree Huyser – backing vocals
- Dave Khan – strings
- Jules Koblun – artwork design
- Joe McCallum – drums, percussion
- Tami Neilson – acoustic guitar, co-producer, vocals
- Cameron Pearce – horns
- Josh Petrie – assistant engineer
- Gwyn Reynolds – horns
- Scott Taitoko – horns
- Neil Watson – guitar, pedal steel guitar

== Charts ==
=== Weekly charts ===
Weekly chart performance for Sassafrass!
Chart (2018)	Peak position
New Zealand Albums (RMNZ)	6

=== Year-end charts ===
Year-end chart performance for Sassafrass!
Chart (2018)	Position
New Zealand Artist Albums (RMNZ)	12

== Release history ==
Release dates and formats for Sassafrass!
Region	Date	Format(s)	Label(s)	Ref.
New Zealand	1 June 2018	CD; vinyl; digital download; streaming	Neilson Records, Southbound	
