= Tami Neilson =

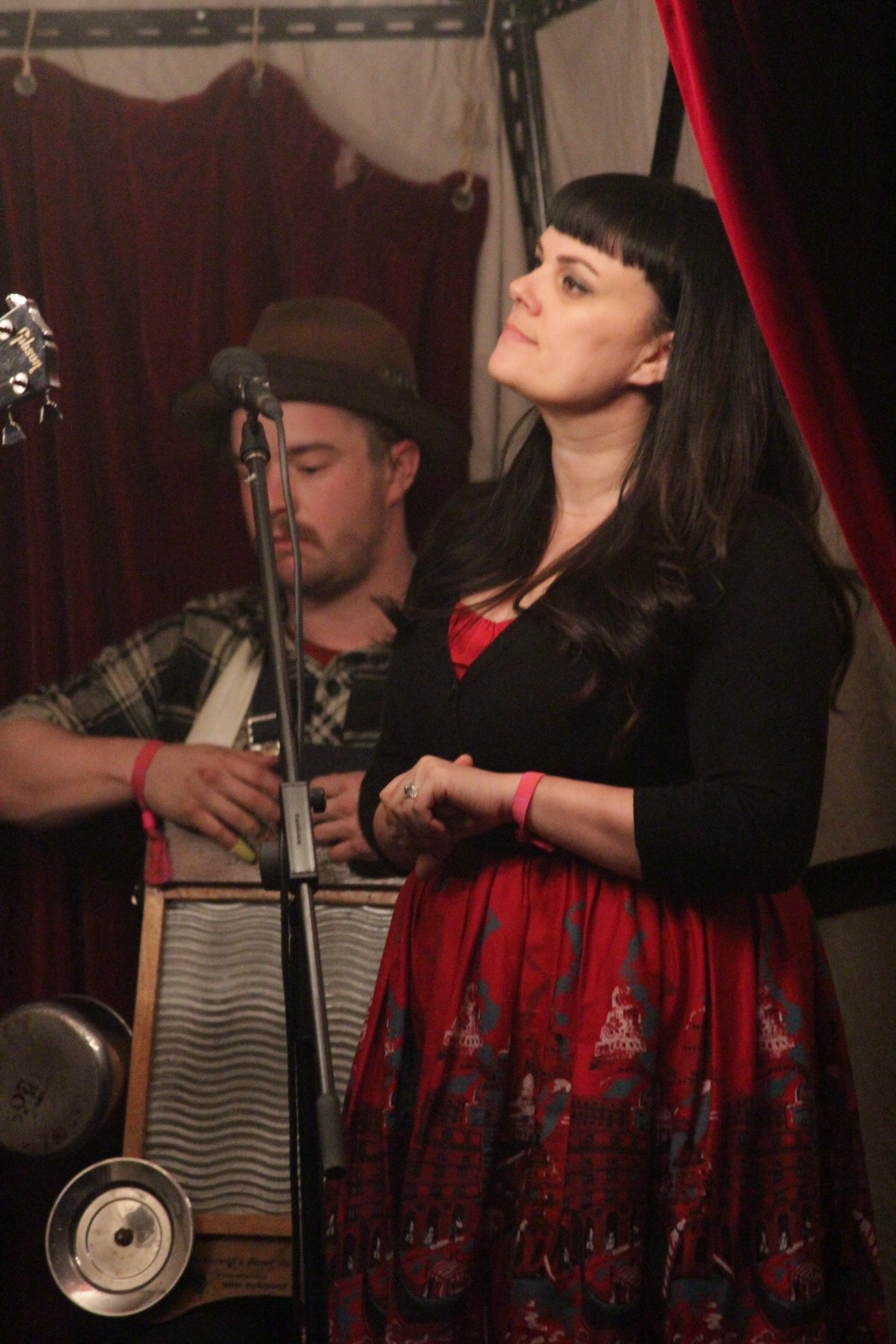
- Tami Neilson, June 2015

Background information
- Born: May 9, 1977 (age 49); Toronto, Ontario, Canada
- Genres: Country rock, Rockabilly, Blues
- Occupations: Musician, songwriter, composer
- Instruments: Vocals, guitar, harmonica
- Years active: 2008–present
- Website: tamineilson.com

Tamara "Tami" Neilson is a Canadian-born New Zealand country & soul singer/songwriter. She is the winner of multiple awards, including the 2014 APRA Silver Scroll Awards and Best Country Song Award; she is also the winner of the Best Country Album at the New Zealand Music Awards in 2009, 2010, 2012, and 2015, and Best Female Artist at the New Zealand Country Music Awards in 2010, 2011, and 2014.

== Biography ==
She grew up as a member of The Neilsons, performing with her parents and two brothers across North America, and continues to co-write much of her work with brother Joshua "Jay" Neilson, who shared her Silver Scroll win as well as producing her first three albums: Red Dirt Angel (2008), The Kitchen Table Sessions, Vol. 1 (2009) and The Kitchen Table Sessions, Vol. II (2011). They also worked together on scoring the New Zealand television series The Brokenwood Mysteries for its second season in 2015, having previously contributed many songs to the first season's soundtrack.

Her album Don't Be Afraid (2015) debuted at No. 3 on the New Zealand Music Charts, and her previous release Dynamite! (2014) was listed in The Guardian as one of the top ten country albums of the year for 2014. In 2020, her song "Hey, Bus Driver", from the album Chickaboom, won APRA's Best Country Song Award. In 2017, Neilson also appeared as a subject of the documentary Prime Rocks: The New Sound of Country in New Zealand, alongside Marlon Williams, Delaney Davidson, and Barry Saunders from The Warratahs. In November 2020, she appeared on David Hartnell MNZM's Best Dressed List.

Neilson's 2022 album, Kingmaker included the single "Beyond the Stars", a duet with country music legend Willie Nelson, which was released to considerable acclaim after being debuted on stage in a live performance with him, at his Luck Reunion concert in March that year. The album went on to debut at #1 on the New Zealand charts in July, which was followed by a sold-out concert with the Auckland Philharmonia Orchestra at the Aotea Centre, and a national tour with Chamber Music New Zealand, during which she performed "Beyond The Stars" with Bret McKenzie in Wellington. She also performed at Mariposa Folk Festival in Canada and Tønder Festival in Denmark that year. "Beyond The Stars" was nominated for the APRA Awards (New Zealand) Silver Scroll Award on 1 September 2022.

Neilson's songs have also appeared on Wanted, Nashville, and The Sounds. In 2022, Neilson herself appeared on The Brokenwood Mysteries performing "Ten Tonne Truck" on the episode "Good as Gold".

Neon Cowgirl was longlisted for the 2026 Polaris Music Prize.

== Personal life ==
Born in Toronto, Ontario, Neilson relocated to Auckland, New Zealand in 2007 where she now resides. She is married to Grant Tetzlaff, a New Zealand Police inspector she first met in 2001. They have two children.

Neilson has Ojibwe ancestry.

== Discography ==
=== Studio albums ===
List of albums, with selected details
Title	Details	Peak chart positions
Title	Details	NZ
Red Dirt Angel	Released: 12 May 2008; Format: CD, digital download; Label: Neilson Records, Southbound, Ode Records	—
The Kitchen Table Sessions, Vol. 1 (with Jay Neilson)	Released: 1 June 2009; Format: CD, digital download; Label: Neilson, Southbound	—
The Kitchen Table Sessions, Vol. II (with Lauren Thomson)	Released: 1 January 2011; Format: CD, digital download; Label: Neilson, Southbound	—
Dynamite!	Released: 21 March 2014; Format: CD, LP, digital download; Label: Neilson, Southbound	10
Don't Be Afraid	Released: 25 September 2015; Format: CD, LP, digital download; Label: Neilson, Southbound, Monkey Music, Outside Studios	3
Sassafrass!	Released: 1 June 2018; Format: CD, LP, digital download; Label: Neilson, Southbound, Outside	6
Chickaboom!	Released: 14 February 2020; Format: CD, LP, digital download; Label: Neilson, Southbound, Outside	8
Kingmaker	Released: 15 July 2022; Format: CD, LP, digital download; Label: Neilson, Southbound, Outside	1
Neilson Sings Nelson	Released: 6 September 2024; Format: CD, LP, digital download; Label: Neilson, Southbound, The Orchard	12
Neon Cowgirl	Released: 11 July 2025; Format: CD, LP, digital download; Label: Outside	19
"—" denotes a recording that did not chart.

=== Collaborative albums ===
List of albums, with selected details
Title	Details
Chanteuses & Shotguns (Lauren Thomson featuring Tami Neilson)	Released: 24 January 2011; Format: CD, digital download; Label: Ode Records

=== Live albums ===
List of albums, with selected details
Title	Details
Songs of Sinners Live	Released: 23 November 2017; Format: CD, digital download; Label: Neilson Records, Southbound

=== Singles ===
==== As lead artist ====
Title	Year	Peak chart positions		Album
Title	Year	NZ Artist	NZ Artist Hot	Album
"Walk (Back to Your Arms)"	2014	5	—	Dynamite!
"Dynamite"	2015	—	—	Dynamite!
"Lonely" (featuring Marlon Williams)	2015	—	—	Don’t Be Afraid
"Holy Moses"	2016	—	—	Don’t Be Afraid
"Loco Mama"	2016	—	—	Don’t Be Afraid
"Reap What You Sow"	2017	—	—	Songs of Sinners Live
"Stay Outta My Business"	2018	—	—	Sassafrass!
"Manitoba Sunrise at Motel 6"	2018	—	—	Sassafrass!
"Devil in a Dress"	2018	—	—	Sassafrass!
"Big Boss Mama"	2019	—	19	Non-album single
"Hey Bus Driver!" (featuring Jay Neilson)	2019	—	—	Chickaboom!
"Any Fool with a Heart" (featuring Jay Neilson)	2019	—	—	Chickaboom!
"Ten Tonne Truck"	2019	—	—	Chickaboom!
"You Were Mine"	2020	—	—	Chickaboom!
"Queenie, Queenie"	2020	—	—	Chickaboom!
"Pretty Paper"	2020	—	—	Non-album singles
"River"	2021	—	—	Non-album singles
"Beyond the Stars" (featuring Willie Nelson)	2022	—	10	Kingmaker
"Baby You're a Gun"	2022	—	—	Kingmaker
"Careless Woman"	2022	—	—	Kingmaker
"Kingmaker"	2022	—	—	Kingmaker
"—" denotes a recording that did not chart.

==== As featured artist ====
Title	Year	Peak chart positions	Album
Title	Year	NZ Artist Hot	Album
"Trouble Finds a Girl" (Jenny Mitchell featuring Tami Neilson)	2021	20	Tug of War

==== Promotional singles ====
Title	Year	Album
"Crazy"	2018	Brokenwood Mysteries (Music from the Original TV Series), Vol. 3

==== Other charted songs ====
Title	Year	Peak chart positions	Album
Title	Year	NZ Artist Hot	Album
"Roimata / Cry Myself to Sleep"	2019	19	Waiata / Anthems
"Mama's Talkin'"	2022	14	Kingmaker

== Awards and nominations ==
=== Country Music Association Awards ===
The Country Music Association Awards are presented in Nashville annually by the Country Music Association to honour outstanding achievement in the country music industry. Nielson has received one nomination.

Year	Association	Award	For	Result	Ref.
2026	Country Music Association Awards	Global Country Artist Award	Herself	Pending	

=== APRA Awards (New Zealand) ===
The APRA Awards (New Zealand) are presented annually by Australasian Performing Right Association to recognise songwriting skills, sales and airplay performance by its members. The APRA Silver Scroll Award is awarded purely on the basis of songwriting.

Year	Award	For	Result
2014 APRA Silver Scroll Awards	Silver Scroll	Tami Neilson / Joshua Neilson, "Walk (Back To Your Arms)"	Won
2016 APRA Silver Scroll Awards	Silver Scroll	Tami Neilson / Joshua Neilson, "The First Man"	Nominated
2022 APRA Silver Scroll Awards	Silver Scroll	Tami Neilson / Delaney Davidson, "Beyond the Stars"	Nominated

=== New Zealand/Aotearoa Music Awards ===
The New Zealand Music Awards are presented annually by Recorded Music NZ recognising outstanding artistic and technical achievements in the recording field. Tami has been nominated multiple times for a number of awards, and won many of them.

Year	Award	For	Result
2009 New Zealand Music Awards	Best Country Music Album	Red Dirt Angel	Won
2010 New Zealand Music Awards	Best Country Music Album	The Kitchen Table Sessions	Won
2012 New Zealand Music Awards	Best Country Music Album	The Kitchen Table Sessions Vol II	Won
2014 New Zealand Music Awards	Best Country Music Song	Tami Neilson / Delaney Davidson, "Whiskey & Kisses"	Won
2015 New Zealand Music Awards	Best Country Music Album	Dynamite!	Won
2015 New Zealand Music Awards	Best Country Music Song	Tami Neilson, "You Lie"	Nominated
2016 New Zealand Music Awards	Album of the Year	Don't Be Afraid	Nominated
2016 New Zealand Music Awards	Best Female Solo Artist	Tami Neilson	Nominated
2018 New Zealand Music Awards	Album of the Year	Sassafrass!	Nominated
2018 New Zealand Music Awards	Best Solo Artist	Tami Neilson	Nominated
2018 New Zealand Music Awards	Best Album Cover	Tami Neilson, Ashley Church, Jules Koblun	Nominated
2019 New Zealand Music Awards	Best Country Music Album	Sassafrass!	Nominated
2019 New Zealand Music Awards	Best Country Music Song	Tami Neilson / Joshua Neilson, "Manitoba Sunrise at Motel 6"	Nominated
2020 Aotearoa Music Awards	Album of the Year	Chickaboom!	Nominated
2020 Aotearoa Music Awards	Best Country Music Song	Tami Neilson / Joshua Neilson, "Hey Bus Driver"	Won
2020 Aotearoa Music Awards	Best Country Music Song	Tami Neilson / Joshua Neilson, "Any Fool with a Heart"	Nominated
2021 Aotearoa Music Awards	Best Country Music Album	Chickaboom!	Won
2021 Aotearoa Music Awards	Best Country Music Song	Tami Neilson, "Queenie, Queenie"	Won

=== Taite Music Prize ===
The Taite Music Prize is an annual New Zealand music award for the best album from New Zealand. Tami Neilson has been nominated four times, more than any other solo artist (and equal with Lawrence Arabia).

Year	For	Result
2015 Taite Music Prize	Dynamite!	Nominated
2019 Taite Music Prize	Sassafrass!	Nominated
2021 Taite Music Prize	Chickaboom!	Nominated
2023 Taite Music Prize	Kingmaker	Nominated
