= Make Way for Love =

Studio album by Marlon Williams
- Released: 16 February 2018
- Studios: Panoramic, California
- Length: 39:03
- Label: Caroline Australia
- Producer: Noah Georgeson

Marlon Williams chronology
Marlon Williams (2015)	Make Way for Love (2018)	Plastic Bouquet (2020)

Singles from Make Way for Love
- 1. "Nobody Gets What They Want Anymore" Released: 8 November 2017

Make Way for Love is the second studio album by New Zealand musician Marlon Williams. It was released 16 February 2018.

== Production ==
The album was recorded with Grammy-winning producer Noah Georgeson at Panoramic Studios in California, USA.

== Release ==
On 8 November 2017, Williams announced the release of his second studio album, along with the single "Nobody Gets What They Want Anymore".

== Critical reception ==
Professional ratings
Aggregate scores
Source	Rating
Metacritic	82/100
Review scores
Source	Rating
AllMusic	4/5 stars
American Songwriter	4/5 stars
DIY	4/5 stars
Drowned in Sound	6/10
Exclaim!	9/10
MusicOMH	4/5 stars

Make Way for Love was met with "universal acclaim" reviews from critics. At Metacritic, which assigns a weighted average rating out of 100 to reviews from mainstream publications, this release received an average score of 82 based on 14 reviews. Aggregator Album of the Year gave the release a 79 out of 100 based on a critical consensus of 13 reviews.

James Christopher Monger of AllMusic explained "Written in the wake of a breakup with fellow Kiwi crooner Aldous Harding, the 11-track set is awash in post-midnight reverb and spilling over with the myopic despondency of heartbreak." Hal Horowitz of American Songwriter noted "singer-songwriter Marlon Williams creates a lasting, durable and above all emotionally poignant work that makes the inherent self-doubt, confusion and frustration of his split feel universal and distinctive."

=== Accolades ===
Publication	Accolade	Rank	Ref.
Exclaim!	Top 10 Folk and Country Albums of 2018	6	
The New Zealand Herald	Top 20 Albums of 2018	1	
Under the Radar	Top 100 Albums of 2018	53	

== Track listing ==
No.	Title	Length
1.	"Come to Me"	3:15
2.	"What's Chasing You"	2:41
3.	"Beautiful Dress"	3:31
4.	"Party Boy"	2:33
5.	"Can I Call You"	3:48
6.	"Love Is a Terrible Thing"	3:12
7.	"I Know a Jeweller"	2:36
8.	"I Didn't Make a Plan"	4:01
9.	"The Fire of Love"	4:31
10.	"Nobody Gets What They Want Anymore"	4:59
11.	"Make Way for Love"	3:56

== Charts ==
Chart	Peak position
Belgian Albums (Ultratop Flanders)	149
Australian Albums (ARIA)	8
Dutch Albums (Album Top 100)	60
New Zealand Albums (RMNZ)	1

== Certification ==
Region	Certification	Certified units/sales
New Zealand (RMNZ)	Gold	15,000^{‡}
^{‡} Sales+streaming figures based on certification alone.
