= Marlon Williams (New Zealand musician) =

New Zealand singer-songwriter (born 1990)

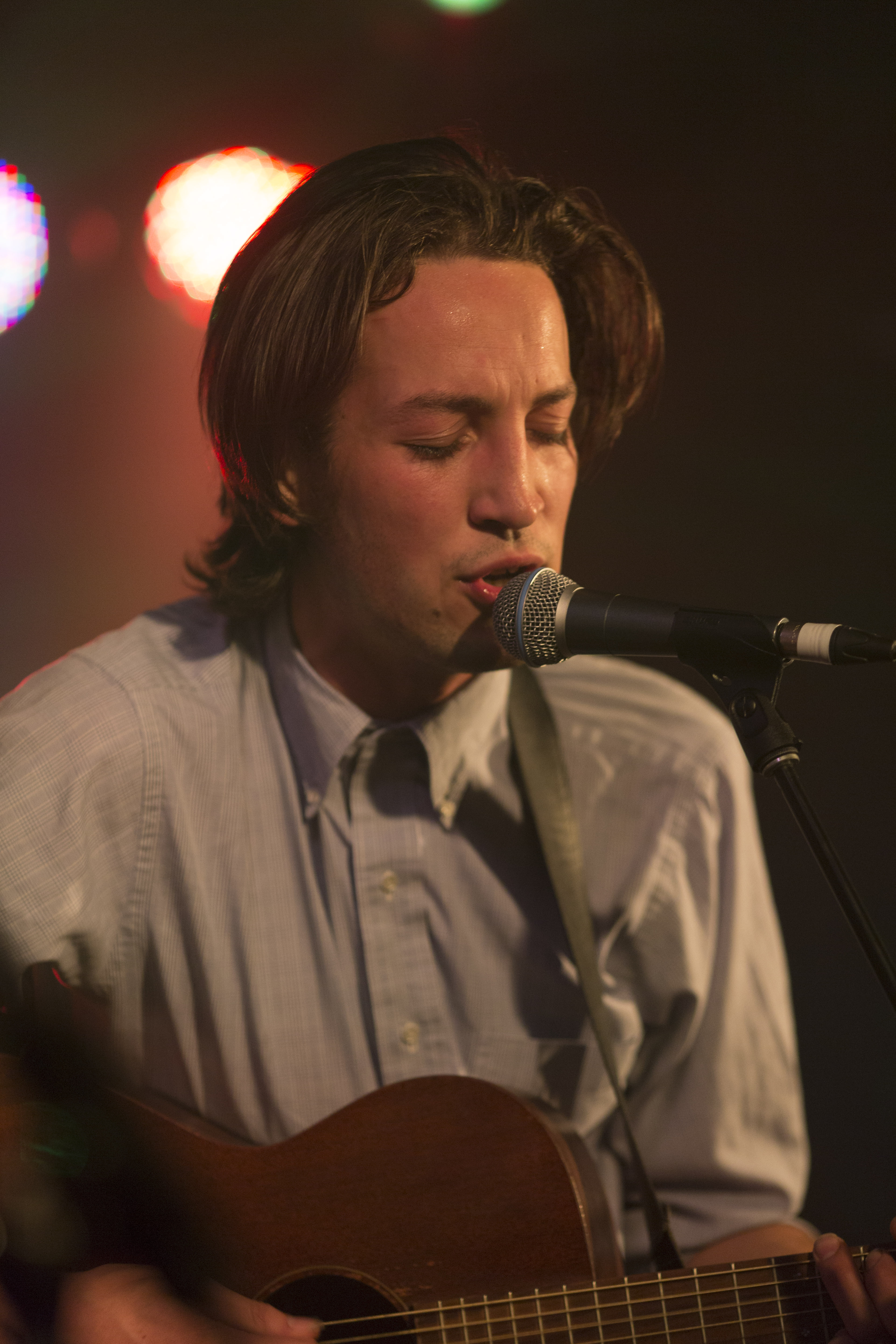
- Williams performing in 2015

Background information
- Born: 31 December 1990 (age 35); Christchurch, New Zealand
- Origin: Lyttelton, New Zealand
- Genres: Alt-country, folk, bluegrass
- Occupations: Musician, singer-songwriter
- Instruments: Vocals, guitar, keyboards
- Years active: 2009–present
- Labels: Caroline Australia, Universal NZ, Dead Oceans
- Website: www.marlonwilliams.co.nz

Marlon Williams (born 31 December 1990) is a New Zealand singer-songwriter, guitarist and actor based in Lyttelton, New Zealand. Primarily known as a solo artist, he first came to attention as front-man of The Unfaithful Ways, and for his collaborative work with musician Delaney Davidson. He works and tours with his backing band The Yarra Benders.

He has won multiple Aotearoa Music Awards, the 2026 Taite Music Prize, and the APRA Silver Scroll. As of May 2026, he has two albums and one single ('What’s Chasing You') that have been certified Gold in New Zealand.

== Early life and education ==
Marlon Williams was born in Christchurch, New Zealand, to David Williams, a librarian and musician, and Jenny Rendall, a visual artist. He was raised in the nearby port town of Lyttelton. He is Māori, of Ngāi Tahu and Ngāi Tai descent.

Williams had a musical upbringing and was a member of the choir of the Cathedral of the Blessed Sacrament, which toured Europe in 2009–10. He was educated at Christchurch Boys' High School and learned to play guitar during his final year there.

== Career ==
=== 2007–2013: Early career with The Unfaithful Ways and Delaney Davidson ===
Williams founded The Unfaithful Ways at 17 with his high school friends Sebastian Warne and Ben Woolley, along with a science teacher at the school, Simon Brouwer. They quickly gained national attention in New Zealand, playing the Big Day Out, and were nominated for a New Zealand Music Award in 2011.

Williams met acclaimed country singer Delaney Davidson in 2011, and the pair began performing as a duo. Over two years they released three volumes of the series, Sad But True: The Secret History of Country Music Songwriting, garnering critical acclaim, including the New Zealand Country Song and Country Album of the year in 2013. Their final album was released in February 2014.

=== 2013–2018: Early solo career and Marlon Williams ===
Relocating to Melbourne, Australia, in mid-2013, Williams began performing solo around town, self-releasing the live album Live At La Niche, touring Australia with US acts Robert Ellis, Cory Chisel and playing Mullumbimby Music Festival. During this time, he lived in Melbourne's inner-city suburb of Abbotsford at the Yarra Hotel.

He began recording his debut solo album in Spring 2014. Despite living in Melbourne, the record was recorded over a year at a Lyttelton studio. That year, he put together his supporting band, The Yarra Benders, aptly named after the pub/hotel they worked and lived in. The Yarra Benders are musicians Gus Agars, Dave Khan and Ben Woolley, and previously guitarist Dan Parsons.

In April 2015, Williams released his debut self-titled solo album to critical acclaim, debuting at number 10 on the New Zealand Albums Chart, and number 31 on the Australian ARIA Albums Chart. The album was called "captivating" by Rolling Stone Australia, a "revelation" by Metro Magazine and "one of the most impressive country records this year" by ToneDeaf. That same years, he did his first national television performance on SBS Australia's music quiz show RocKwiz, and at the Sydney Opera House for TEDxSydney. In September 2015, Williams signed to American independent label Dead Oceans who then released and distributed the album worldwide on 2 February 2016. It was a finalist for the 2016 Taite Music Prize.

Beginning in June 2014, Williams toured nearly non-stop for three-and-a-half years. While working on his record in 2014, Williams embarked on a co-headline tour with Melody Pool, playing 26 shows around Australia and New Zealand, before closing the year with performances at Queenscliff Music Festival, Wave Rock Weekender, Mullumbimby Music Festival, and a full band tour alongside Justin Townes Earle and Lindi Ortega in Australia and New Zealand. He toured Europe for the first time in May 2015, and in Fall 2015 began performing across the United States, the United Kingdom, Continental Europe, and Australia until November 2017, which included stints opening for Paul Kelly, Lucinda Williams, and Kasey Chambers, and Sam Beam and Jesca Hoop. Williams and the Yarra Benders opened two shows in 2017 for Bruce Springsteen and the E Street Band on their Summer '17 tour.

=== 2018–2019: Make Way for Love and Live at Auckland Town Hall ===
On 16 February 2018, Williams released his album Make Way for Love. To support the record, Willams first toured the United States and Europe before playing a series of European and Australian summer music festival dates through November 2018.

Williams released a live album Live at Auckland Town Hall was released a year later on 1 February 2019 as a double album. The album was recorded in May 2018 at the historic Auckland Town Hall. Williams and the Yarra Benders continued to tour extensively through the end of 2019. In May 2020, Williams premiered a full live concert film of the "Live at Auckland Town Hall" album. The film ran 109 minutes for free through YouTube and Facebook followed by a live Q&A with fans.

=== 2022–present: My Boy & Te Whare Tīwekaweka ===
Williams released his third album My Boy in 2022. After releasing singles My Boy, River Rival, Easy Does It and Don't Go Back, the full album was released.

In January 2025, Williams announced the release of an entirely Māori album titled Te Whare Tīwekaweka, Lorde appears as a guest artist in one track titled "Kāhore He Manu E". The album won the 2026 Taite Music Prize, and Album of the Year at the 2026 Aotearoa Music Awards.

== Film and television appearances ==
In 2015, Williams had a supporting role in the ABC Television miniseries The Beautiful Lie; he appeared in all six of the show's episodes. The following year, he had a small role in the 2016 New Zealand independent film The Rehearsal.

Williams appeared in the 2018 Bradley Cooper-directed film A Star Is Born, after Cooper saw Williams perform at The Troubadour in Los Angeles and asked him personally to appear in the film. Williams appears as a fictionalized version of himself during a Roy Orbison tribute performance, opposite musician Brandi Carlile and Cooper's character.

The Justin Kurzel–directed film True History of the Kelly Gang, in which Williams plays George King, had its world premiere at the 2019 Toronto International Film Festival. The film also stars Russell Crowe, Nicholas Hoult, Charlie Hunnam and Essie Davis. Williams also has a supporting role in the Australian film Lone Wolf, which was filmed during Summer 2019 and was expected to be released in 2020. In 2021, Williams played Johnny Abbot in Netflix series Sweet Tooth.

=== As himself ===
On 14 June 2016, Marlon Williams and the Yarra Benders made their US television debut as the musical guests on the American late-night talk show Conan. Williams appeared as a subject of the 2018 documentary The New Sound of Country on Prime Rocks in New Zealand, alongside Tami Neilson, Delaney Davidson and Barry Saunders.

== Discography ==
=== Studio albums ===
Title	Details	Peak chart positions				Certifications
Title	Details	NZ	AUS	BEL	NED	Certifications
Marlon Williams	Released: 2015; Label: Caroline Australia (MW001CD); Format: CD, LP, DD	7	31	100	66	RMNZ: Gold
Make Way for Love	Released: February 2018; Label: Caroline Australia (MW002CD); Format: CD, LP, DD	1	8	149	60	RMNZ: Gold
My Boy	Released: 9 September 2022; Label: Caroline Australia (MW005CD); Format: CD, LP, DD	1	10	—	—	
Te Whare Tīwekaweka	Released: 4 April 2025; Label: Marlon Williams; Format: CD, LP, DD	1	28	—	—	RMNZ: Gold

=== Collaborative albums ===
Title	Details	Peak chart positions
Title	Details	NZ
Sad but True Volume 1: The Secret History of Country Music Songwriting (with Delaney Davidson)	Released: 2012; Label: Lyttelton (LR01); Format: CD, LP, DD	—
Sad but True Volume 2: Grand Ole Hayride (with Delaney Davidson and Tami Neilson)	Released: 2013; Label: Lyttelton; Format: CD, DD	—
Sad but True Volume 3: Juke Box B-Sides (with Delaney Davidson)	Released: 2014; Label: Lyttelton (LR04); Format: CD, LP, DD	—
Plastic Bouquet (with Kacy & Clayton)	Released: 2020; Label: Caroline Australia (MW004CD); Format: CD, LP, DD	5

=== Live albums ===
Title	Details	Peak chart positions
Title	Details	NZ
Live at La Niche	Released: 2013; Format: Limited edition CD	—
Live at Auckland Town Hall	Released: 2019; Label: Caroline Australia (MW003CD); Format: CD, LP, DD	14

=== Other charted songs ===
List of other charted songs, with selected chart positions
Title	Year	Peak chart positions	Album
Title	Year	NZ Hot	Album
"My Heart the Wormhole"	2022	39	My Boy
"Princes Walk"	2022	40	My Boy
"Don't Go Back"	2022	11	My Boy
"Soft Boys Make the Grade"	2022	38	My Boy
"E Mawehe Ana Au"	2025	24	Te Whare Tīwekaweka
"Kei Te Mārama"	2025	20	Te Whare Tīwekaweka
"Aua Atu Rā"	2025	19	Te Whare Tīwekaweka
"Me Uaua Kē"	2025	23	Te Whare Tīwekaweka

== Filmography ==
=== Acting ===
==== Film ====
Year	Title	Role	Notes
2016	The Rehearsal	Theo	
2018	A Star Is Born	Marlon Williams	
2019	True History of the Kelly Gang	George King	
2021	Lone Wolf	Alex Ossipon	
2023	Bad Behaviour	Elmore	

==== Television ====
Year	Title	Role	Notes
2015	The Beautiful Lie	Dylan	6 episodes
2021, 2023	Sweet Tooth	Johnny Abbot	Recurring co-star (season 1); Main (season 2)
2025	The Twelve	Xavier Colby	(season 3)

== Awards and nominations ==
For his music, Williams has won multiple New Zealand Music Awards, New Zealand's most prominent music award, as well as the country's most significant songwriting honor, APRA's Silver Scroll, among other recognition.

From twelve nominations including three for Album of the Year, Williams has won five New Zealand Music Awards, including Breakthrough Artist of the Year in 2015 and Album of the Year in 2018 for Make Way for Love. Williams was recognized early in his music career when his group The Unfaithful Ways was nominated for the ceremony's Critics' Choice Prize in 2011. He has been a finalist for an APRA Award on four separate years. He won his first APRA Award in 2013 with Delaney Davidson, receiving the honor for Best Country Music Song after being a finalist the previous year in the same category. In 2015, Marlon was shortlisted for the prestigious Silver Scroll songwriting award for "Dark Child." His single "Nobody Gets What They Want Anymore (feat. Aldous Harding)" was awarded the Silver Scroll in 2018. Additionally, he was nominated for a 2015 ARIA Music Award in the category of Best Blues and Roots Album.

In November 2020 he was named one of the best dressed men in show business on David Hartnell MNZM's Best Dressed List.

Year	Association	Category	Nominated work	Result	Note
2011	New Zealand Music Awards	Critics' Choice Prize	The Unfaithful Ways (as part of The Unfaithful Ways)	Nominated	
2012	APRA Awards	Best Country Music Song	"Ghost of the Town" (as part of The Unfaithful Ways)	Nominated	
2013	APRA Awards	Best Country Music Song	"Bloodletter" (with Delaney Davidson)	Won	
2013	New Zealand Music Awards	Best Country Music Album	Sad but True: Volume 1 (with Delaney Davidson)	Won	
2015	New Zealand Music Awards	Album of the Year	Marlon Williams	Nominated	
2015	New Zealand Music Awards	Best Male Solo Artist	Marlon Williams	Won	
2015	New Zealand Music Awards	Best Alternative Album	Marlon Williams	Nominated	
2015	New Zealand Music Awards	Single of the Year	"Dark Child"	Nominated	
2015	New Zealand Music Awards	Breakthrough Artist of the Year	Marlon Williams	Won	
2015	New Zealand Music Awards	Best Country Music Album	Sad But True: Volume 3 (with Delaney Davidson)	Nominated	
2015	APRA Awards	Silver Scroll	"Dark Child"	Nominated	
2015	ARIA Music Awards	Best Blues and Roots Album	Marlon Williams	Nominated	
2015	Music Victoria Awards	Best Country Album	Marlon Williams	Nominated	
2015	Music Victoria Awards	Best Male Artist	Marlon Williams	Nominated	
2016	Taite Music Prize		Marlon Williams	Nominated	
2018	New Zealand Music Awards	Album of the Year	Make Way for Love	Won	
2018	New Zealand Music Awards	Best Solo Artist	Marlon Williams	Won	
2018	New Zealand Music Awards	Best Alternative Artist	Marlon Williams	Nominated	
2018	APRA Awards	Silver Scroll	"Nobody Gets What They Want Anymore (feat. Aldous Harding)"	Won	
2018	NZMA Artisan Awards	Best Music Video	"Vampire Again"	Won	
2019	Taite Music Prize	Taite Music Prize	Make Way for Love	Nominated	
2019	New Zealand Music Awards	Album of the Year	Live at Auckland Town Hall	Nominated	
2024	Aotearoa Music Awards	Best Solo Artist	Marlon Williams	Won	
2025	APRA Awards	Silver Scroll	"Aua Atu Rā"	Won	
2026	Taite Music Prize		Te Whare Tīwekaweka	Won	
2026	Aotearoa Music Awards	Album of the Year	Te Whare Tīwekaweka	Won	
2026	Aotearoa Music Awards	Single of the Year	"Aua Atu Rā"	Won	
2026	Aotearoa Music Awards	Best Solo Artist	Te Whare Tīwekaweka	Won	
2026	Aotearoa Music Awards	Mana Reo	Te Whare Tīwekaweka	Nominated	
2026	Aotearoa Music Awards	Best Māori Artist	Te Whare Tīwekaweka	Nominated	
2026	Aotearoa Music Awards	Best Producer	Te Whare Tīwekaweka	Nominated	
2026	Country Music Honours	Best country song	"Whakameatia Mai"	Won	
