= Delaney Davidson =

New Zealand musician

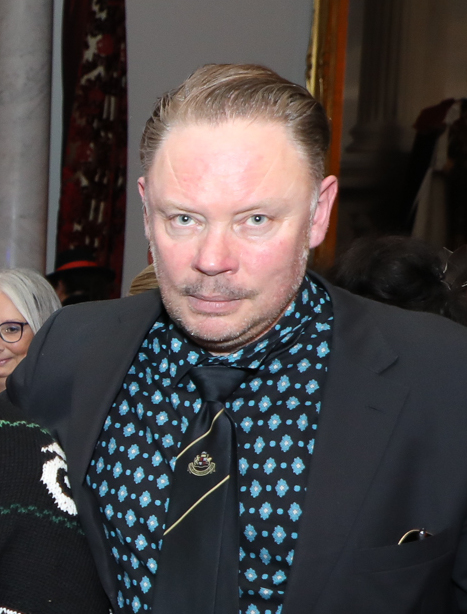
- Davidson at the preview party for Troy Kingi's Black Sea Golden Ladder (2021)
- Born: 15 December 1972 (age 53); Auckland, New Zealand
- Occupation: Singer-songwriter
- Website: Official website

Delaney F. Davidson (born 15 December 1972 in Auckland) is a singer-songwriter and music producer from Lyttelton, New Zealand. He is primarily a multi-instrumentalist solo artist but is also known for his many collaborations, such as with Marlon Williams and Tami Neilson. His music is described as gothic Americana or country/folk noir, with influences from European folk music, Switzerland's "blues trash scene," and blues. He is a three-time winner of the Best Country Music Song Award at the APRAs (2012, 2014, 2023) and won Country Music Album of the Year at the 2013 New Zealand Music Awards. He was also a New Zealand Arts Foundation Laureate in 2015.

== Early life ==
Davidson was born in Auckland, the son of John Davidson and Glyn Ellen Abbott. His mother came to New Zealand from England with her parents as a child. He grew up in Christchurch but lived briefly in Lyttelton as a teenager in the 1980s after his parents divorced. He was educated at the Christchurch Rudolf Steiner School and played in several punk and blues bands before being expelled from school for having a "bad attitude" and moving to Melbourne.

== Career ==
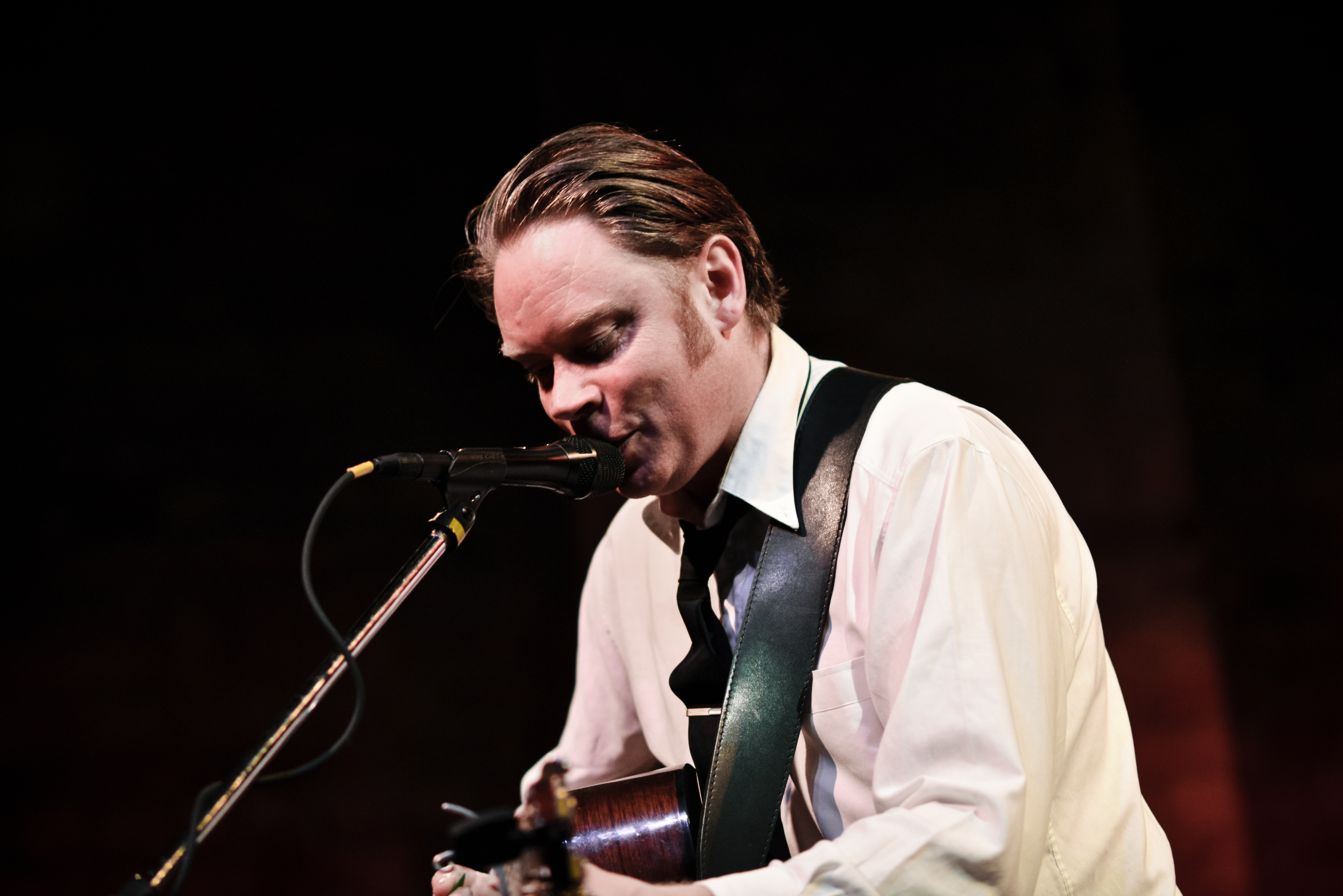
Delaney Davidson – Grand Old Hayride Tour, March 2013

In Melbourne, Davidson began playing as a drummer with Nique Needles, Stu Thomas, Doghouse, and The Brass Bed. He performed with Ewan Cameron in Theatre of Hell and took part in Premeditated Depredation, a freak performance art piece. At this time, he began moving towards country music and solo performance. After six years in Australia, he moved to Switzerland, where he lived for seven years. While there, he met Reverend Beat-Man, owner of Voodoo Rhythm Records, and joined the Dead Brothers, who he toured with for three years, recording Flammend Herz (2004) and WunderKammer (2006), the former of which served as the soundtrack to a documentary, also called Flemmend Herz, about Herbert Hoffmann. He was influenced by European folk music and Switzerland's "blues trash scene," bringing it with him when he returned to Auckland. During this time, he developed his solo show into the Ghost Orchestra.

In 2009 and 2010, Davidson toured the US with Holly Golightly, and as a duo with Reverend Beat-Man. When he returned to New Zealand, he became deeply involved with the folk scene in Lyttelton, along with musicians including Marlon Williams, Tami Neilson, Aldous Harding, The Eastern, and Nadia Reid. He was particularly influential to Marlon Williams, who has referred to him as a mentor figure, and has been collaborating with him extensively since they met in the early 2010s. In 2011, following the Christchurch earthquake, he and other Lyttelton artists formed the music collective Harbour Union. Proceeds from their album went 100% to charities working to rebuild the city.

In 2011, Davidson released three collaboration albums with Marlon Williams. In 2013, he and Williams released Sad But True – The Secret History of Country Music Songwriting Volume 1, which won them the New Zealand Music Awards' Country Music Album of the Year and an APRA for Best Country Music Song ("Bloodletter"). In 2014, he co-wrote "Whiskey & Kisses" with Tami Neilson, which was subsequently chosen as Best Country Music Song at the APRAs. The song appeared on Neilson's album Dynamite! (2014), which Davidson produced. He also co-produced her album Don't Be Afraid (2015). Davidson followed up the first volume of Sad But True with two more instalments, the second self-released during the Grand Ole Hayride Tour. The third volume, Juke-Box B-Sides, reached #12 on the New Zealand Albums Chart in February 2014.

In 2015, Davidson's album Lucky Guy reached the Top 40 Albums in the New Zealand Music Charts, peaking at number 24. In 2017, he started on his Magic Lightbox tour, an expansive 31-city tour that combined live performance and film. He went on another Magic Lightbox tour in 2018 to present the second instalment of his films, Ship of Dreams. In 2023, he co-wrote "Beyond the Stars" with Tami Neilson. It was performed by Neilson and Willie Nelson and won the Best Country Music Song Award at the APRA Awards. His single "Out of My Head" peaked at #16 in the Aotearoa Music Charts in March 2024. He wrote the majority of this album during the COVID-19 lockdown period. In 2025, he and Troy Kingi released the single "Kārearea" with Forest & Bird as part of their new music series, Waiata Manu, honouring New Zealand's Bird of the Year winners. This project was pitched by Davidson, who wanted to continue Hirini Melbourne's tradition of writing waiata about New Zealand's birds. That September, he was announced as the musical director of the 2025 APRA Silver Scroll Awards.

Davidson has collaborated widely throughout his career. In addition to his frequent collaborators, Tami Neilson and Marlon Williams, he has worked with SJD, Bruce Russell, Harry Lyon, Reb Fountain, Troy Kingi, Hayley Westenra, Graham Brazier, Neil Finn, Eric McFadden, Nathaniel Rateliff, Reverend Beat-Man, Jordan Luck, and Kim Richey. Davidson was also part of the collaborative workshops at Pat MacDonald's Steel Bridge Songfest in 2009 and 2013.

In addition to music, Davidson is also an exhibiting visual artist. In 2018, he had a screen print show called The End.

== Discography ==
With the Dead Brothers:

- 2004: Flammend Herz (Voodoo Rhythm Records)
- 2006: WunderKammer (Voodoo Rhythm Records)

Delaney Davidson:

- 2007: Rough Diamond (Stink Magnetic)
- 2008: Ghost Songs (self-released)
- 2010: Self Decapitation (Voodoo Rhythm Records)
- 2011: The Harbour Union, featuring Davidson, The Eastern, Lindon Puffin, Al Park, The Unfaithful Ways, Tiny Lies and Runaround Sue
- 2011: Bad Luck Man (Voodoo Rhythm Records)
- 2012: Sad But True – The Secret History of Country Music Songwriting Volume 1 (with Marlon Williams) (Lyttelton Records)
- 2013: Sad But True Volume Two (as "The Grand Ole Hayride" with Tami Neilson, Marlon Williams and Dave Khan) (self-released)
- 2014: Sad But True Volume 3 – Juke-Box B-Sides (with Marlon Williams) (Lyttelton Records)
- 2014: Swim Down Low (Southbound Records)
- 2015: Diamond Dozen (Squoodge Records)
- 2015: Lucky Guy (Rough Diamond Records/Southbound Music)
- 2016: Devil In The Parlour: 6 Live Tracks (Rough Diamond Inc)
- 2018: Shining Day (Glass Records Redux)
- 2019: One Hand Loose (with Bruce Russell) (Ilam Press Records)
- 2024: Out Of My Head (Rough Diamond Inc)
- 2024: Happiness Is Near (with Barry Saunders)

Produced:

- 2014: Produced Dynamite! for Tami Neilson
- 2015: Produced Don't Be Afraid for Tami Neilson
- 2018: Produced To the Sea for Harry Lyon
- 2019: Produced Better Already - The Song of Al Park, tribute album collaboration
- 2020: Co-produced Chickaboom! with Tami Neilson<
- 2021: Co-produced Black Sea Golden Ladder with Troy Kingi

== Film ==
- The Dead Brothers (2006) as himself
- Voodoo Rhythm: The Gospel of Primitive Rock N' Roll (2006) as himself
- The Road to Nod (2007) as Parrish
- Prime Rocks: The New Sound of Country Music (2016) as himself
- Devil In The Parlour (2016) as himself
- Hellhound On My Trail (2017) as himself

== Awards and honours ==
Year	Award	Awarding body	Work	Outcome	Notes	Ref(s)
2010	Sad Song Competition			Won	In Berlin	
2011	One Man Band Competition			Won	In Zurich	
2011	Silver Scroll Award	APRA AMCOS	"Little Heart"	Shortlisted		
2012	Best Country Music Song Award	APRA AMCOS	"You're A Loser"	Won		
2013	Best Country Music Song Award	APRA AMCOS	"Bloodletter"	Won	With Marlon Williams	
2013	Country Music Album of the Year	Recorded Music NZ	Sad But True – The Secret History of Country Music Songwriting Volume 1	Won	With Marlon Williams	
2014	Best Country Music Song Award	APRA AMCOS	"Whiskey & Kisses"	Won	With Tami Neilson	
2015	New Zealand Arts Foundation Laureate	New Zealand Arts Foundation		Selected		
2015	Taite Music Prize	Independent Music New Zealand	Swim Down Low	Shortlisted		
2022	Artist-in-Residence	Massey University		Selected		
2023	Best Country Music Song Award	APRA AMCOS	"Beyond the Stars"	Won	With Tami Neilson	
2023	Stoddart Cottage-Purau Residency	Stoddard Cottage Gallery		Selected		
2025	Taite Music Prize	Independent Music New Zealand	Out of My Head	Shortlisted		
