= Swordfish (disambiguation) =

A swordfish is a type of large fish.

Swordfish may also refer to:

== Military ==
- Fairey Swordfish, a British carrier-based biplane torpedo bomber
- HMS Swordfish, the name of three British warships
- Swordfish, a 1962 U.S. Operation Dominic I and II nuclear test explosion
- Swordfish class destroyer, a class of two Royal Navy destroyers
- Swordfish Long Range Tracking Radar, used by India for ballistic missile defense
- USS Swordfish, the name of two submarines in the United States Navy
- Zwaardvis class submarine (Dutch for swordfish), a Royal Netherlands Navy class of conventional attack submarines

== Other uses ==
- Swordfish (clipper), an 1851 ship designed by William H. Webb
- Swordfish (film), a 2001 action thriller directed by Dominic Sena
- Swordfish (soundtrack), a soundtrack album from the film
- Swordfish (Merk album), 2016
- Swordfish Studios, a video game developer
- Swordfish Translation Editor, a translation tool based on XLIFF standard
- "Swordfish", a song by the Dead Milkmen from Big Lizard in My Backyard
- Swordfish, a sudoku technique
- Swordfish Man, fictional villain in the 2013 Indian film Krrish 3
