= Martin Sagadin =

Yugoslavian film director

- Born: 22 June 1991 (age 33); Kranj, SR Slovenia, Yugoslavia
- Citizenship: Yugoslavia (1991) Slovenia (1991-present) New Zealand (2005-present)
- Education: MFA, University of Canterbury, 2018
- Occupations: Film director, music video director, musician, artist
- Years active: 2011-present
- Awards: 2019 New Zealand Music Awards, Nominated for Best Video: The Barrel

Martin Sagadin (born 22 June 1991) is a Slovenian and New Zealand film and music video director, and musician. They are known for directing music videos for New Zealand musicians such as Aldous Harding, Marlon Williams and Tiny Ruins.

== Early life and education ==
Martin Sagadin was born on 22 June 1991 in Kranj, Yugoslavia, now part of present-day Slovenia. Martin grew up in the village of Zgornja Bela. In 2005, they moved to Blenheim, New Zealand with family.

In 2010, they moved to Christchurch to study film at the University of Canterbury. Sagadin's first day at university was the day of the 2011 Christchurch Earthquake. In 2018 they completed a master's degree in fine arts, with focus on film directing and writing, at the University of Canterbury, graduating with distinction. In 2023, Sagadin completed Crest, a feature film intensive run by Jane Campion.

== Career ==
Sagadin began their work on music videos in 2014, directing the video for Aldous Harding's single ‘No Peace’. Sagadin and Harding have continued to collaborate since, including on the video for Harding's hit single ‘The Barrel’.

In 2021, Sagadin and Harding collaborated on the video for Harding's single 'Old Peel'. For the video, Sagadin made an appearance in front of the camera, switching places with Harding to star as the singer in the music video.

Sagadin's debut album Martin iz Zgornje Bele was released on 5th of December 2025 on Ba Da Bing Records and Melted Ice Cream.

== Filmography ==
Films
Year	Title	Role
2016	'Short Trillogy of Peace'	Director, editor, cinematographer
2018	'Oko Na Roki'	Director, editor, cinematographer
2019	'Spring Interlude'	Director
2021	'Songs in the Hills with Archer'	Director, editor, cinematographer
2022	'Dispeller'	Director, editor
2022	'Garden of Clay'	Director, editor, cinematographer

Music Videos
Year	Song	Artist	Role
2014	'No Peace'	Aldous Harding	Director
2015	'Stop Your Tears'	Aldous Harding	Co-director with Aldous Harding
2015	'Strange Things'	Marlon Williams	Director
2017	'Chomsky's Sweater'	Pickle Darling	Director
2018	'What's Chasing You'	Marlon Williams	Director
2018	'Come to Me'	Marlon Williams	Director
2018	'Bodycon'	Girlboss	Director
2018	'Greedy Bitch'	Horn	Director
2018	'Demeter'	Indi	Director, set builder and painter
2018	'Give it to Me'	Motte	Director
2018	'Lozenge'	Ben Woods	Director
2018	'Pink Flamingos'	Richard Dada	Director
2019	'Holograms'	Tiny Ruins	Director
2019	'Rose Quartz'	Richard Dada	Director
2019	'Bicycle Weather'	Pickle Darling	Director
2019	'The Barrel'	Aldous Harding	Co-director with Aldous Harding
2019	'Zoo Eyes'	Aldous Harding	Co-director with Aldous Harding
2019	'Romancy'	Ben Woods	Director, Cinematographer, Editor
2019	'Good 2 be Sleeping'	Ben Woods	Director, Cinematographer, Editor
2019	'Out of Our Hands'	Delaney Davidson & Barry Saunders	Director
2019	'Stolen River'	Delaney Davidson & Barry Saunders	Director
2019	'Turn Around'	Adam Hattaway and the Haunters	Director
2019	'Take Care of You'	Adam Hattaway and the Haunters	Director
2019	'All of the Time Not at All'	Finn Johansson	Director
2019	'Best Thing in the Room'	Lisa Crawley	Director
2019	'Extreme Heights'	Mousey	Director
2020	'Nothing Lasts'	Adam Hattaway and the Haunters	Co-director with Marlon Williams
2020	'Oh Canada'	Nadia Reid	Director
2020	'Get the Devil Out'	Nadia Reid	Director
2020	'H.N.Y.B'	Merk	Co-director with Merk
2020	'Sink or Swim'	Marlin's Dreaming	Director, Editor
2020	'Lonely After'	Yumi Zouma	Director, Editor
2020	'Used to Be'	Womb	Director, Editor
2020	'How Cool'	Ryan Fisherman	Director, Cinematographer, Editor
2020	'The Tunnel'	French for Rabbits	Director
2021	'God'	Merk	Co-director with Merk
2021	'Body Rhyme'	Ben Woods	Director, Editor
2021	'Til I meet you again'	Psychadellic Birthday Party	Director, Editor
2021	'The Bench'	Mousey	Co-director with Sarena Close, Editor
2021	'My Hands are Made of Glass'	Mousey	Co-director with Sarena Close, Editor
2021	'Observation'	Ryan Fisherman	Director
2021	'Ouija Board'	French for Rabbits	Co-director with Misma Andrews, Editor
2021	'The Outsider'	French for Rabbits	Co-director with Brooke Singer, Editor
2021	'Walk the Desert'	French for Rabbits	Co-director with Brooke Singer, Editor
2021	'Laps aroud the Sun'	Merk	Co-director with Merk and Abigail Egden
2021	'Old Peel'	Aldous Harding	Producer, appears as the singer
2022	'My Boy'	Marlon Williams	Co-director with Marlon Williams
2022	'Pushing & Pulling'	Miles Calder	Producer, editor
2022	'Easy Does It'	Marlon Williams	Co-director with Marlon Williams
2022	'Abstract Oils'	CRUSH	Co-director with CRUSH
2022	'Something'	Soaked Oats	Director, producer, editor
2022	'Oceans'	Womb	Director, editor
2022	'Lawn'	Aldous Harding	Co-director with Aldous Harding
2022	'Fever'	Aldous Harding	Co-director with Aldous Harding
2023	'Head Terrarium'	Pickle Darling	Director, editor, cinematographer, co-set and prop builder with Laura Duffy
2023	'Changeling'	After the Flesh	Director, editor
2023	'Rodeo'	Amira Grenell	Director, editor, cinematographer
2023	'Mattress'	Cuticles	Director
2023	'Lanterns'	Amira Grenell	Director, editor, cinematographer
2023	'Don't Walk Away From Love'	Delaney Davidson	Director, editor, cinematographer
2024	'Out of my head'	Delaney Davidson	Director, editor, cinematographer
2025	'Loline'	The Bats	Director, editor, cinematographer
2025	'The Gown'	The Bats	Director, editor, cinematographer
2025	'Gold & Blue'	French for Rabbits	Co-director with Brooke Singer, Editor
2025	'Desire'	Georgia Knight	Co-director with Marlon Williams, Georgia Knight and Tom Lynch, editor
2025	'Mingle'	Georgia Knight	Co-director with Marlon Williams & Georgia Knight, cinematographer, editor
2025	'Howling Moons'	Cuticles	Director
2025	'Everybody Knows My Business Now'	Georgia Knight	Co-director with Marlon Williams & Georgia Knight, cinematographer, editor
2025	'Wrong Party'	Fazed on a Pony	Director & Editor
2026	'Flashes'	Fazed on a Pony	Director & Editor
2026	'Venus in the Zinnia'	Aldous Harding	Made with Aldous Harding, H. Hawkline, Hopey Parish, Michelle Henning
2026	'Baby Heavyweight'	Delaney Davidson	Co-director with Delaney Davidson
2026	'Hard Evidence'	Ringlets	Director & Editor
2026	'Greatness'	Timothy Blackman	Director & Editor

== Discography ==
- Martin iz Zgornje Bele (2025)

== Personal life ==
Sagadin is non-binary and uses any pronouns.
