= Party (Aldous Harding album) =

Studio album by Aldous Harding
- Released: 19 May 2017
- Studios: J & J Studio, Bristol
- Length: 38:44
- Labels: 4AD; Flying Nun
- Producer: John Parish

Aldous Harding chronology
Aldous Harding (2014)	Party (2017)	Designer (2019)

Singles from Party
- 1. "Horizon" Released: 10 February 2017; 2. "Imagining My Man" Released: 29 March 2017

Party is the second studio album by New Zealand folk singer-songwriter Aldous Harding, released on 19 May 2017 by 4AD. The album was recorded in Bristol with John Parish, who produced the album, and features contributions from Parish, Fenne Lily, and Mike Hadreas.

The album was nominated for Album of the Year at the 2017 New Zealand Music Awards. It was also nominated for IMPALA's European Album of the Year Award.

== Release ==
"I'm So Sorry" was premiered through The 405 on 17 March 2016.

"Horizon" was released as a single on 10 February 2017 with an accompanying music video directed by Charlotte Evans. The album was detailed the same day.

"Imagining My Man" was released as a single on 29 March 2017 with an accompanying music video, also directed by Charlotte Evans.

A music video for "Blend" was released on 12 June 2017, also directed by Charlotte Evans.

== Critical reception ==
Professional ratings
Aggregate scores
Source	Rating
AnyDecentMusic?	7.7/10
Metacritic	83/100
Review scores
Source	Rating
AllMusic	3.5/5 stars
The A.V. Club	B
DIY	4/5 stars
Exclaim!	8/10
The Guardian	4/5 stars
The New Zealand Herald	4/5 stars
The Observer	4/5 stars
Q	4/5 stars
Record Collector	5/5 stars
Uncut	8/10

At Metacritic, which assigns a normalised rating out of 100 to reviews from mainstream publications, the album received an average score of 83, based on 11 reviews.

Kitty Empire of The Observer gave Party a positive review, commenting, "Harding is her own woman, an arresting vocalist whose mannered deliveries – from chanteuse to jazzy – and intense themes defy obvious influence." Rob Mesure of musicOMH praised the album, saying, "Shifting moods and voices effortlessly, Harding is an often technically astonishing performer, and Party is a work of quiet power. An inviting, captivating darkness." Haydon Spenceley of Drowned in Sound gave the album a favourable review, saying, "There is something both abstract and individual and yet universal about the way that Harding writes and presents her trials and triumphs of the heart." James Christopher Monger of AllMusic said, "Party finds the sweet spot between raw and refined, and in doing so, feels very real."

Jon Pareles of The New York Times said "her exposed voice is riveting, changing character from song to song. It’s piping and childlike in "Party," while it's low and poised in "Imagining My Man" except for sudden, vehement interruptions: "I do not have the answer," she cries with cutting dissonance."

Kelsey J. Waite of The A.V. Club described the album as evidence of Harding's "command of her craft" but lamented that "the fantastic background experimentation, bleating wind instruments, and appearances by Mike Hadreas (Perfume Genius) are ultimately too slight to lend the record much in the way of dynamics."

== Track listing ==
All tracks are written by Aldous Harding.

No.	Title	Length
1.	"Blend"	2:29
2.	"Imagining My Man"	5:51
3.	"Living the Classics"	2:44
4.	"Party"	5:43
5.	"I'm So Sorry"	3:48
6.	"Horizon"	4:09
7.	"What If Birds Aren't Singing They're Screaming"	3:04
8.	"The World Is Looking for You"	5:08
9.	"Swell Does the Skull"	5:48
Total length:		38:44

== Personnel ==
Credits adapted from liner notes.

- Aldous Harding – vocals, guitar, piano
- John Parish – guitar, piano, drums, synth, backing vocals
- Enrico Gabrielli – Rhodes electric piano, saxophone, bass clarinet
- Mike Hadreas – vocals (2, 9)
- Fenne Lily – vocals (8)
- choir (2)
  - Bess Manley
  - Helen Cockill
  - Jamileh Ravaan
  - Jennifer Bell
  - Judith Jung
  - Nulla Honan

Production

- John Parish - production, mixing
- Oliver Baldwin – recording
- Ali Chant – mixing
- Aldous Harding - art direction, photography
- Chris Bigg – design
- Liv – photography

== Charts ==
Chart (2017)	Peak position
French Albums (SNEP)	149
New Zealand Albums (RMNZ)	6
