= Spenceley =

Spenceley or Spencely is an English surname that may refer to

- Alfred Spenceley (1890–?), English boxer
- George Spenceley, English photographer and mountaineer
  - Spenceley Glacier
- Haydon Spenceley (born 1984), English Christian musician and worship leader
- Hugh Spencely (1900–1983), British architect
- James Spenceley (born 1976), Australian businessman, entrepreneur and company director
