= Aldous Harding =

New Zealand folk musician (born 1990)

- Harding at the 2026 Montreux Jazz Festival

Background information
- Born: Hannah Sian Topp; 1990 (age 35–36); Lyttelton, New Zealand
- Genre: Indie folk
- Occupation: Singer-songwriter
- Instruments: Vocals; guitar; piano
- Labels: 4AD; Flying Nun; Lyttelton
- Website: aldousharding.com

Hannah Harding (born 1990 as Hannah Sian Topp), known professionally as Aldous Harding (/ˈɔːldəs/ AWL-dəs), is an indie folk singer-songwriter from Lyttelton, New Zealand. She is known for her "elastic, shape-shifting voice", her enigmatic lyrics and eccentric performances and video clips.

Harding first gained recognition after the release of her self-titled debut album in 2014, inspired by English folk music. She then signed with 4AD to team up with producer John Parish in Wales. With the 2017 release of her album Party, The Guardian called her "one of the most original songwriters around". Her following album Designer in 2019 was described as "warm and full of humor", and "simply extraordinary".

Two months after the release Metacritic listed Designer as the world's seventh most critically acclaimed album of 2019, and eight most Shared Album of 2019. The single "The Barrel" won the APRA Silver Scroll Award. Released in 2022, Harding's fourth album, Warm Chris consolidated the acclaim.

== Childhood ==
Born in 1990, Harding was born as Hannah Sian Topp; Harding is her stepfather's surname. Her parents, now divorced, are both musicians. Her mother, Canadian folk singer Lorina Harding, bought her a guitar when she was seven or eight, "and my stepfather at the time owned a guitar shop and music was everywhere. But I didn't want what they had." She was fearful, "kind of sad" and "certainly troubled", she said, and thought about becoming a vet, but singing was natural to her. She made her recording debut at 13 singing with her mother, "Exactly What to Say", a song they wrote together about the mother/daughter relationship. At Logan Park High School in Dunedin she started singing together with her friend Nadia Reid and attended music class. She was 15 when she wrote her first song and "realised I quite like to write songs". After high school, she travelled through Europe, the UK, and Canada "in a boozy haze".

== Beginnings in Lyttelton ==
Harding's family had "moved a lot", lived in Auckland and Dunedin, and had an organic farm near Geraldine, a pastoral town with a population just shy of 3,000. But Lyttelton, which had a small but vibrant musical scene (featuring artists which received international acclaim, such as Marlon Williams, Nadia Reid, and Tiny Ruins) near Christchurch was decisive for her musical career.

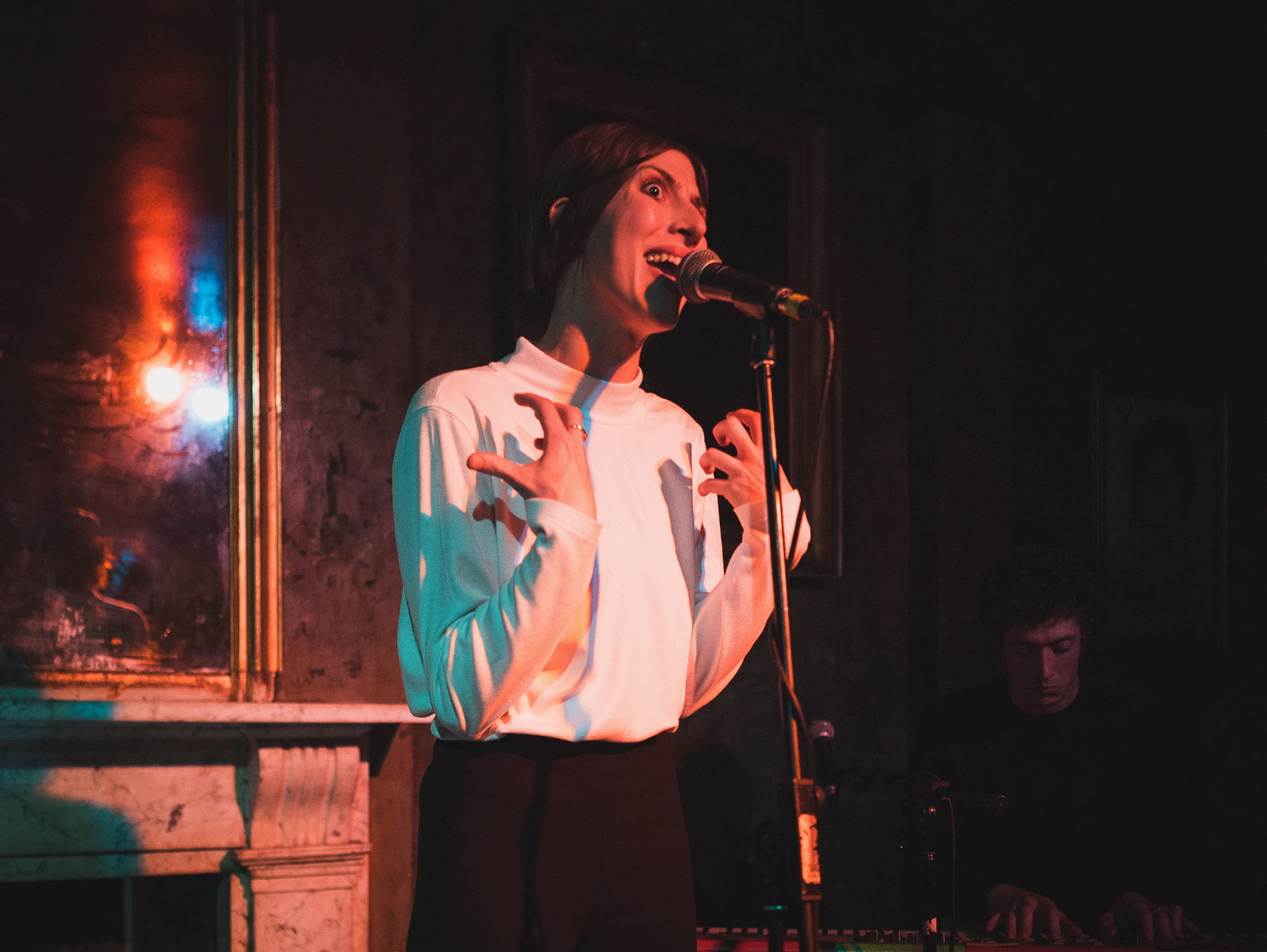
Aldous Harding performing "Horizon" at London's Old Queen's Head in 2016

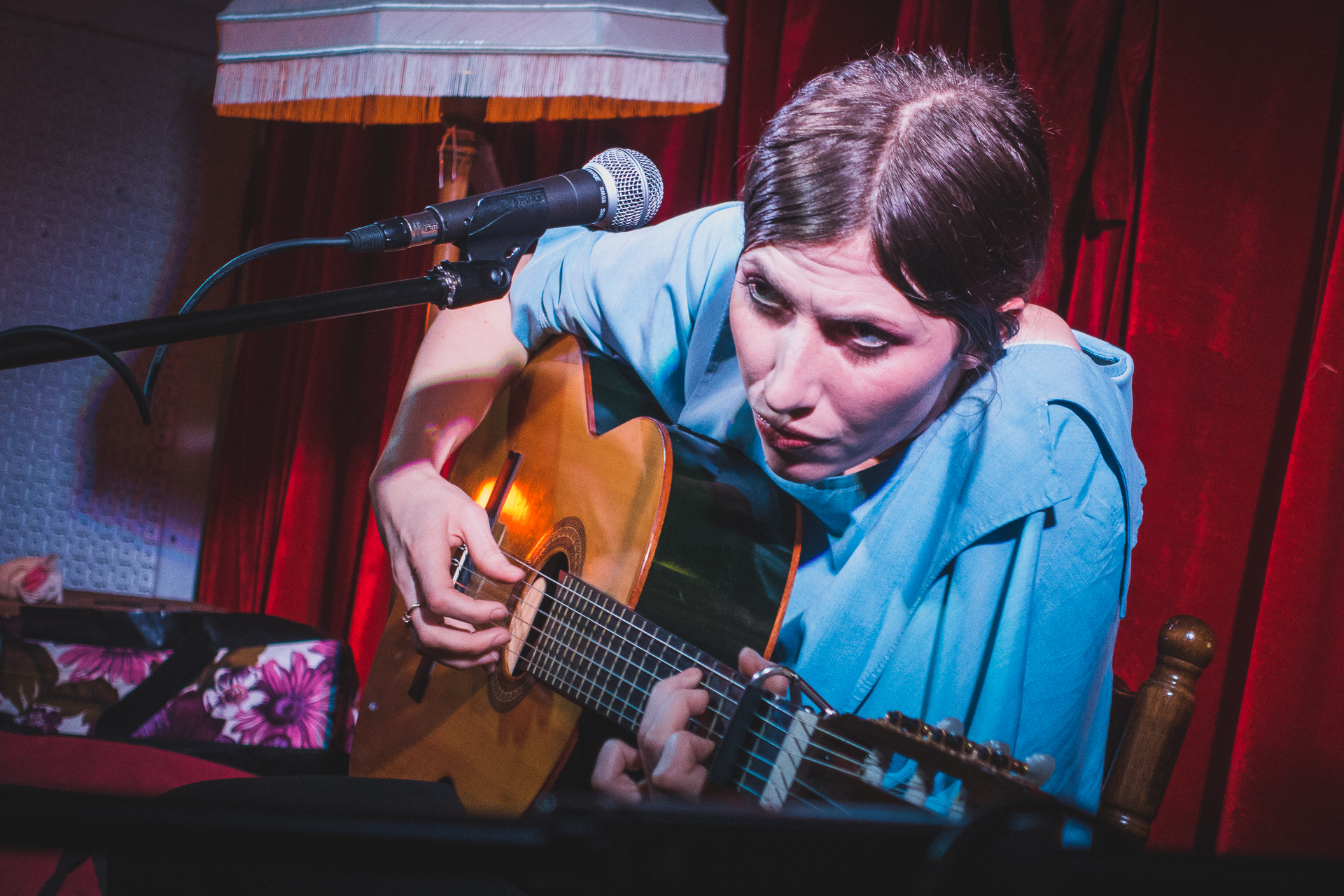
Aldous Harding at Paper Dress Vintage, Hackney, London in 2016

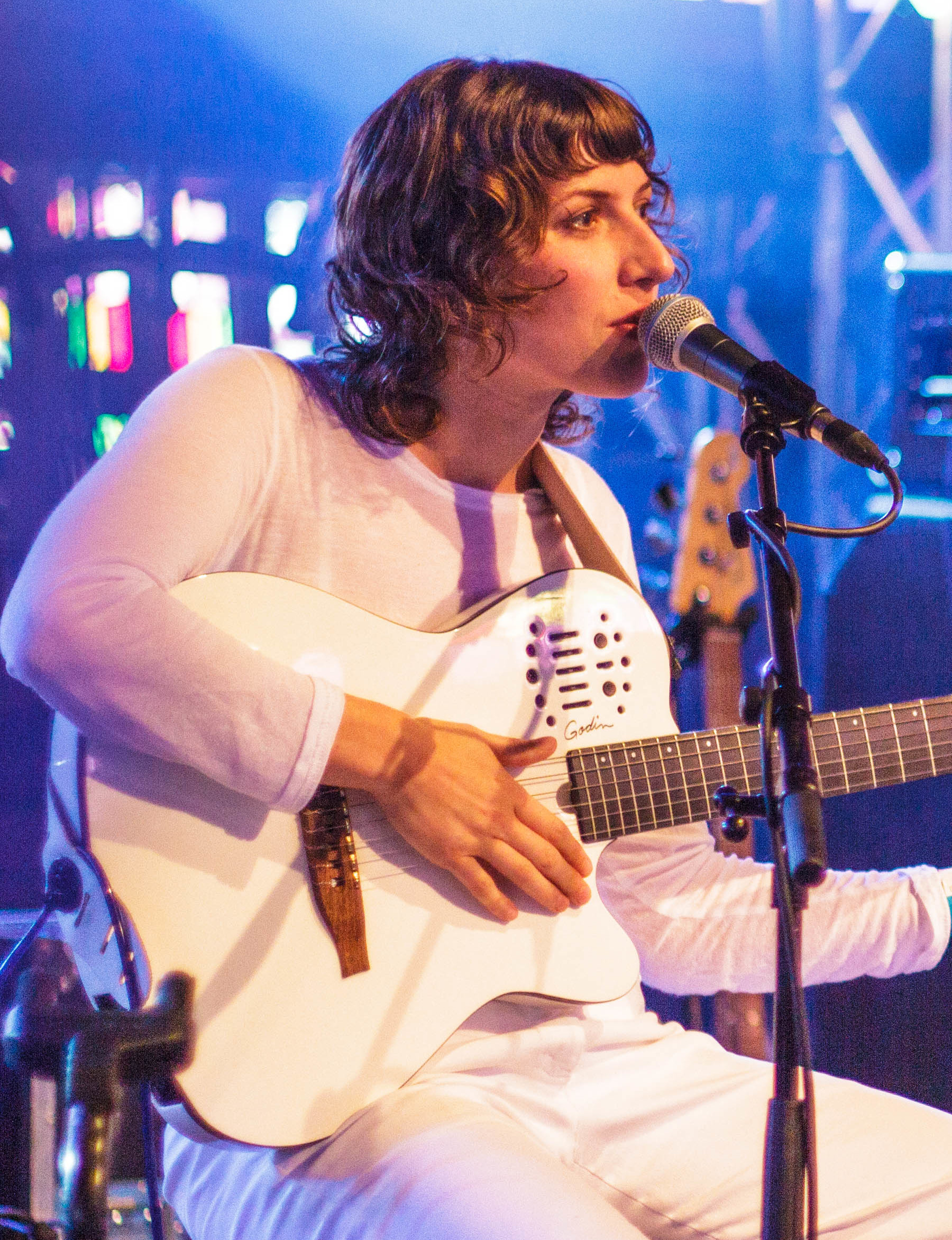
Aldous Harding at Haldern Pop Festival (Germany) in 2017

She has released music through independent record labels Flying Nun, Spunk, and 4AD. She has collaborated with Marlon Williams, John Parish, Mike Hadreas (better known by his stage name Perfume Genius), and Fenne Lily. She is known to frequently collaborate with music video director Martin Sagadin.

4AD announced Harding as a new signing in early 2017 just prior to the release of her second studio album, Party. Party was nominated for IMPALA's European Album of the Year Award. Harding won two awards at the NZ Music Awards in 2017 - Breakthrough Artist and Alternative. She was also nominated for Best Solo Artist and Album Of The Year, for Party. The album won the Taite Prize in 2018.

The song "The Barrel", from her third studio album Designer, won the 2019 APRA Silver Scroll award. The album was nominated for the 2020 Taite Music Prize. Harding won one award at the NZ Music Awards in 2019 - Alternative. She was also nominated for Album Of The Year, for Designer, Single Of The Year, and Best Solo Artist.

In 2022, she released her fourth studio album, Warm Chris. It became her first number one album in her home country, and also featured two of her first charting singles there, with "Tick Tock" peaking at No. 31, and "Ennui" peaking at No. 40 on the New Zealand Hot Singles Chart. The album was nominated for Album Of The Year at the NZ Music Awards in 2022.

== Discography ==
All albums released as LP, CD and digital files.

=== Studio albums ===
List of albums, with selected chart positions
Title	Release date	Label	Peak chart positions		
Title	Release date	Label	NZ	AUS	FRA
Aldous Harding	9 April 2014	Lyttelton (LR-006, URA462) NZ; Flying Nun (FN566) NZ/US	35	—	—
Party	19 May 2017	Flying Nun (FN575); 4AD (4AD0008) worldwide	6	—	149
Designer	26 April 2019	4AD (4AD0102), Flying Nun (FN587)	5	53	101
Warm Chris	25 March 2022	4AD (4AD0391), Flying Nun (FN605)	1	31	—
Train on the Island	8 May 2026	4AD (4AD0873), Flying Nun (FN643)	4	41	190

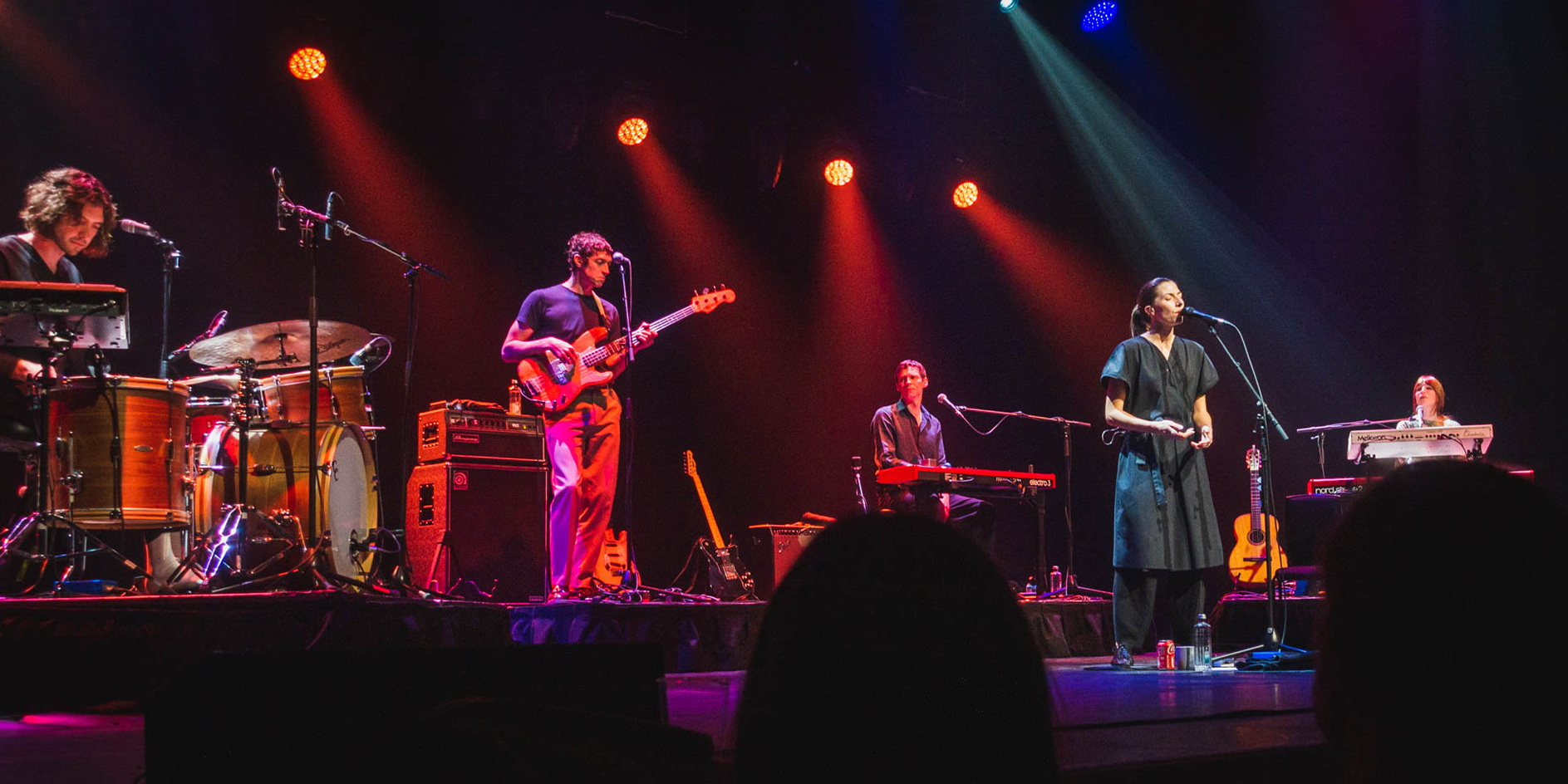
Aldous Harding with band at the Barbican in London in 2023

=== Other charted songs ===
List of other charted songs, with selected chart positions
Title	Year	Peak chart positions	Album
Title	Year	NZ Hot	Album
"Ennui"	2022	40	Warm Chris
"Tick Tock"	2022	31	Warm Chris
"I Ate the Most"	2026	26	Train on the Island
"Train on the Island"	2026	28	Train on the Island
"Worms"	2026	31	Train on the Island
