= Merk (musician) =

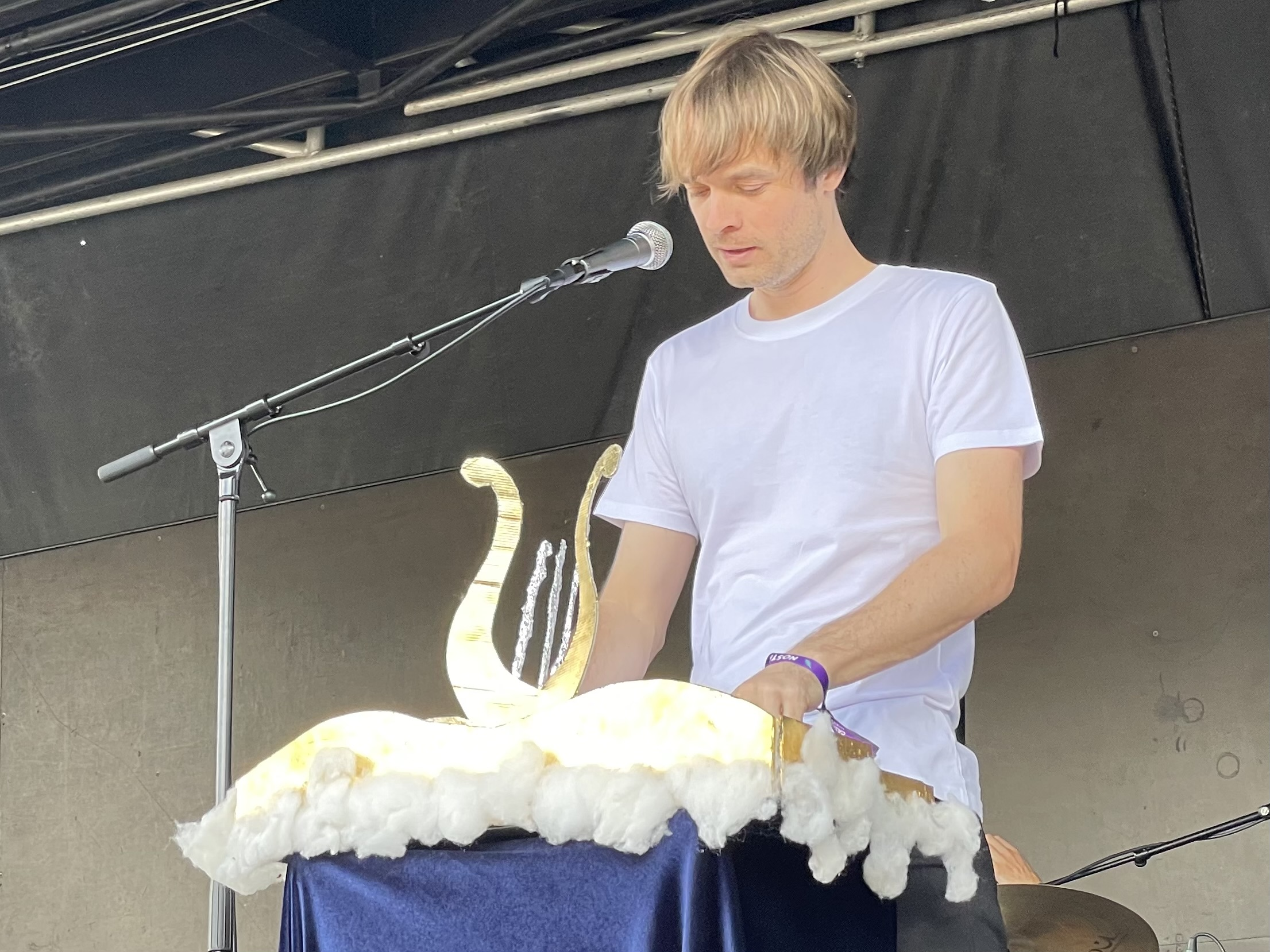
- Merk playing at the 2023 Nostalgia Festival, Christchurch, New Zealand.

Background information
- Born: Mark Perkins; 1994 (age 31–32); Tauranga, New Zealand
- Origin: Auckland, New Zealand
- Genres: Alternative pop, hip hop, indie pop
- Occupations: Singer-songwriter, multi-instrumentalist
- Instruments: Vocals, Guitar, Keyboard
- Years active: 2016–present
- Labels: Humblebrag; Dew Process; Flying Out
- Website: planetmerk.com

Mark Perkins (born 1994), performing as Merk, is a New Zealand singer-songwriter. In 2016 he attended the Red Bull Music Academy in Montreal. Merk won the Independent Music NZ's inaugural Auckland Live Best Independent Debut award in 2017. He has released two studio albums: Swordfish (2016) and Infinite Youth (2021).

== Early life ==
Mark Perkins was born in 1994 in Tauranga. He played music throughout school, and after graduating in 2011 moved to Auckland to perform with a friend. He later got an internship at Roundhead Studio owned by Neil Finn. During his spare time he would learn the ropes of the recording and producing process with Finn. His next job was at another company packing boxes, and in exchanged was granted permission to use the store basement as his recording studio.

== Musical career ==
=== 2016–2017: Early years and Swordfish ===
Recognising his talent, in 2016 Red Bull sent Merk to represent New Zealand at the Red Bull Music Academy in Montreal. After which he graduated as an alumni. On 18 November, Merk released his debut album Swordfish written, recorded, produced and mixed by himself with additional help from Alexander Wildwood and Ben Jeffares. Djeisan Suskov was credited with mastering the album. The album took around six to eight months to record according to Perkins, he recorded five versions of each song. Within a short amount of time after release, the album gained over 70,000 streams across Spotify and Soundcloud.

In January 2017, Merk won the Independent Music NZ's inaugural Auckland Live Best Independent Debut award. On 30 March, a music video was released for his single "I'm Easy".

On 2 May 2018, the single "Lucky Dilemma" was released and added to subsequent reissues of Swordfish. On 5 May, Merk performed as support for local New Zealand musician Estère.

=== 2018–2019: "Hang" ===
In February and March 2018 Merk supported Australian pop group Cub Sport on their 'Bats' Australian tour. On 29 August, he released his new single "Hang", a so-called "anthem for hanging out in solitude" aimed at introverts. A music video for "Hang" was released on 26 September.

In January 2019 he announced that he was going on a four-date tour with Julia Jacklin starting 27 February, performing in Christchurch, Dunedin, Auckland, and Wellington.

=== 2020–present: Infinite Youth ===
On 21 February 2020, Merk released the single "H.N.Y.B." and announced his signing to new Australian record label Humblebrag Records, alongside announcing Australian and New Zealand tour dates and his official showcases at SXSW (which was later cancelled due to the COVID-19 pandemic). The music video for "H.N.Y.B" was co-directed by Martin Sagadin and Merk.

On 28 January 2021, Merk released the single "GOD", which debuted in SPIN Magazine's "A Day in the Life" and was described as "strapped with a disco-indebted synth line, skittering percussion, bouncing bass and repetitive mantra-esque lyrics." The music video was released the same day, co-directed by Martin Sagadin and Merk. Merk announced his forthcoming album Infinite Youth on 25 February along with the release of his song "Laps Around The Sun", which premiered on Clash Magazine and was described as "a deft, sincere piece of songwriting, with Merk's heart-on-sleeve approach resulting in an incredibly endearing track." The accompanying music video for the song was created by Martin Sagadin, Abigail Egden and Merk. Merk's single "Deep Dive" was released on 18 March along with the announcement of his first ever national headline tour. "Deep Dive" was described as "syrupy sweet pop" and Merk praised as "a master at creating tracks that feel minimal and sparse, imbibed with hidden gems, giving head spinning depth." The music video for "Deep Dive" was released on 17 March and was written and directed by the New Zealand band Sports Team.

== Musical style ==
Merk's sound has been described as bedroom pop, psych-pop, and home-spun alternative pop. On Merk's Bandcamp site he tags his music similarly, with alternative, indie, pop, and psychedelic.

== Discography ==
=== Studio albums ===
List of studio albums, with selected chart positions
Title	Album details	Peak chart positions
Title	Album details	NZ
Swordfish	Released: 18 November 2016; Label: Flying Out, Dew Process; Format: CD, cassette, digital download, streaming	— (Note: Swordfish did not enter the Top 20, but peaked at number 3 on the NZ Heatseeker Albums Chart.)
Infinite Youth	Released: 9 April 2021; Label: Humblebrag; Format: LP, CD, cassette, digital download, streaming	—

=== Singles ===
Title	Year	Album
"Ash & Sand"	2016	Swordfish
"No Better Reason"	2016	Swordfish
"Manchuria"	2016	Swordfish
"I'm Easy"	2016	Swordfish
"Lucky Dilemma"	2018	Swordfish
"Hang"	2018	non-album single
"H.N.Y.B."	2020	Infinite Youth
"GOD"	2021	Infinite Youth
"Laps Around The Sun"	2021	Infinite Youth
"Deep Dive"	2021	Infinite Youth

=== Music videos ===
Year	Song	Director
2017	"I'm Easy"	Parallel Teeth
2018	"Hang"	Parallel Teeth
2020	"H.N.Y.B."	Martin Sagadin and Merk
2021	"GOD"	Martin Sagadin and Merk
2021	"Laps Around The Sun"	Martin Sagadin, Abigail Egden and Merk
2021	"Deep Dive"	Sports Team
