= Freeslave =

Music band

- Origin: Hampshire, England
- Genres: Christian alternative rock, indie rock
- Years active: 2003–2007
- Label: Ambience
- Past members: Haydon Spenceley; Mark Constance; Dan Henderson; Aaron Lewis; Dave Willis; Ben Lewis; Jon Satherley; Matt Brombley

Freeslave was an English Christian alternative rock band from Hampshire, England, formed in 2003 and disbanded in 2007, with the lead vocalist, Haydon Spenceley. The band released one studio album, Songs for the Dying (2005), and three extended plays, Project Freedom (2003), Remember the Day (2004) and Save My Day (2006).

== Background ==
The band was formed during 2003 with its membership being Spenceley, lead vocalist and keyboard player Mark Constance, background vocalist and rhythm guitarist Dan Henderson, lead guitarist and bass guitarist Dave Willis and drummer Jon Satherley. Its membership changed by the end with Aaron Lewis as the lead guitarist, Ben Lewis as the bass guitarist and Matt Brombley as the drummer, going from a quintet to a quartet.

== Music history ==
The band's first two releases were the extended plays, Project Freedom, in 2003, and Remember the Day, in 2004. A single, "Love Explosion", was released in 2005, followed by a studio album, Songs for the Dying, the same year. The final release, an extended play, Save My Day, was released in 2006, shortly before the band disbanded in 2007.

== Members ==
Members

- Haydon Spenceley – lead vocals, keys
- Mark Constance – background vocals, rhythm guitar
- Dan Henderson – lead guitar
- Aaron Lewis – lead guitar
- Dave Willis – bass guitar
- Ben Lewis – bass guitar
- Jon Satherley – drums
- Matt Brombley – drums

== Discography ==
Studio albums

- Songs for the Dying (2005)

EPs

- Project Freedom (2003)
- Remember the Day (2004)
- Save My Day (2006)

Singles

- "Love Explosion" (2005)
