= Warm Chris =

Studio album by Aldous Harding
- Released: 25 March 2022
- Studios: Rockfield Studios (Rockfield, Monmouthshire, Wales)
- Genres: Baroque pop; folk-pop; psychedelic folk
- Length: 39:12
- Labels: 4AD; Flying Nun
- Producer: John Parish

Aldous Harding chronology
Designer (2019)	Warm Chris (2022)	Train on the Island (2026)

Singles from Warm Chris
- 1. "Lawn" Released: 2022; 2. "Fever" Released: 2022; 3. "Ennui" Released: 2022; 4. "Tick Tock" Released: 2022

Warm Chris is the fourth studio album by the New Zealand indie folk singer-songwriter Aldous Harding, released on 25 March 2022 by 4AD. The album peaked at number-one on the New Zealand Albums chart. Its release was preceded by two singles, "Lawn" and "Fever". Two subsequent singles from Warm Chris, charted on the New Zealand Hot Singles Chart, with "Tick Tock" peaking at No. 31, and "Ennui" peaking at No. 40.

== Composition ==
Musically, Warm Chris has been described as baroque pop, "endearingly introspective" folk-pop, and freak folk/"gentle" psychedelic folk.

== Critical reception ==
Professional ratings
Aggregate scores
Source	Rating
AnyDecentMusic?	7.7/10
Metacritic	82/100
Review scores
Source	Rating
AllMusic	4/5 stars
Clash	9/10
The Observer	4/5 stars
Paste	8.3/10
Pitchfork	8.2/10

In a review for Pitchfork, Sophie Kemp gave the album a positive review, praising it as showcasing "some of Harding's best songwriting yet".

== Track listing ==
All tracks are written by Aldous Harding.

Warm Chris track listing
No.	Title	Length
1.	"Ennui"	4:38
2.	"Tick Tock"	3:39
3.	"Fever"	4:17
4.	"Warm Chris"	3:46
5.	"Lawn"	3:37
6.	"Passion Babe"	3:33
7.	"She'll Be Coming Round the Mountain"	4:28
8.	"Staring at the Henry Moore"	3:19
9.	"Bubbles"	3:55
10.	"Leathery Whip"	4:00
Total length:		39:12

== Personnel ==
- Ali Chant – mixing, vocals
- Aldous Harding – bell, composer, acoustic guitar, humming, piano, electric piano, vocals
- Gavin Fitzjohn – flugelhorn, horn, baritone saxophone
- H. Hawkline – banjo, bass, design, Fender Rhodes, guitar, electric guitar, layout, Hammond organ, photography, vocals
- Hopey Parish – vocals
- Jason Mitchell – mastering
- Jason Williamson – vocals
- Joe Jones – engineer
- John Parish – bass, drums, Fender Rhodes, electric guitar, humming, keyboards, mixing, Hammond organ, percussion, producer, shaker, slide guitar, tambourine, vocals
- Seb Rochford – drums
- Steve Prescott – assistant photographer

== Charts ==
=== Weekly charts ===
Chart performance for Warm Chris
Chart (2022)	Peak position
Australian Albums (ARIA)	31
Belgian Albums (Ultratop Flanders)	33
Belgian Albums (Ultratop Wallonia)	111
German Albums (Offizielle Top 100)	45
New Zealand Albums (RMNZ)	1
Scottish Albums (Official Charts)	10
Swiss Albums (Schweizer Hitparade)	68
UK Albums (Official Charts)	52
UK Independent Albums (Official Charts)	5

=== Year-end charts ===
Year-end chart performance for Warm Chris
Chart (2022)	Position
New Zealand Artist Albums (RMNZ)	19

== See also ==
- List of number-one albums from the 2020s (New Zealand)
