= Paper Dress Vintage =

Vintage clothes shop and music venue in Hackney, London, England

Coordinates: 51°32′50″N 0°03′17″W

- Interactive map of Paper Dress Vintage
- Location: 352a Mare St, London E8 1HR
- Owner: Hannah Turner Voakes and Steve Dix
- Events: Rock and roll, Soul music, Punk rock, Indie rock, Indie pop

Construction
- Opened: 2007 on Curtain Road, 2016 on Mare Street

Website
- https://paperdressvintage.co.uk

Paper Dress Vintage is a vintage clothes shop and live music venue on Mare Street in the London Borough of Hackney.

== History ==
Started as a seller at vintage fairs, before opening as a traditional vintage clothing store on Curtain Road in Shoreditch in 2007, founder Hannah Turner Voakes and husband Steve Dix began throwing parties in the shop eventually leading to bands regularly performing in the window. It added a bar in 2011 and in 2016 the shop moved to its current location.

The current building has two storeys, with a stage on the upper floor. There’s a beer garden through the back and a yoga studio in an adjoining room.

In 2019 it was awarded a grant by Arts Council UK's Supporting Grassroots Live Music Fund which was used by the venue to upgrade the sound and lighting.

== Notable performers ==
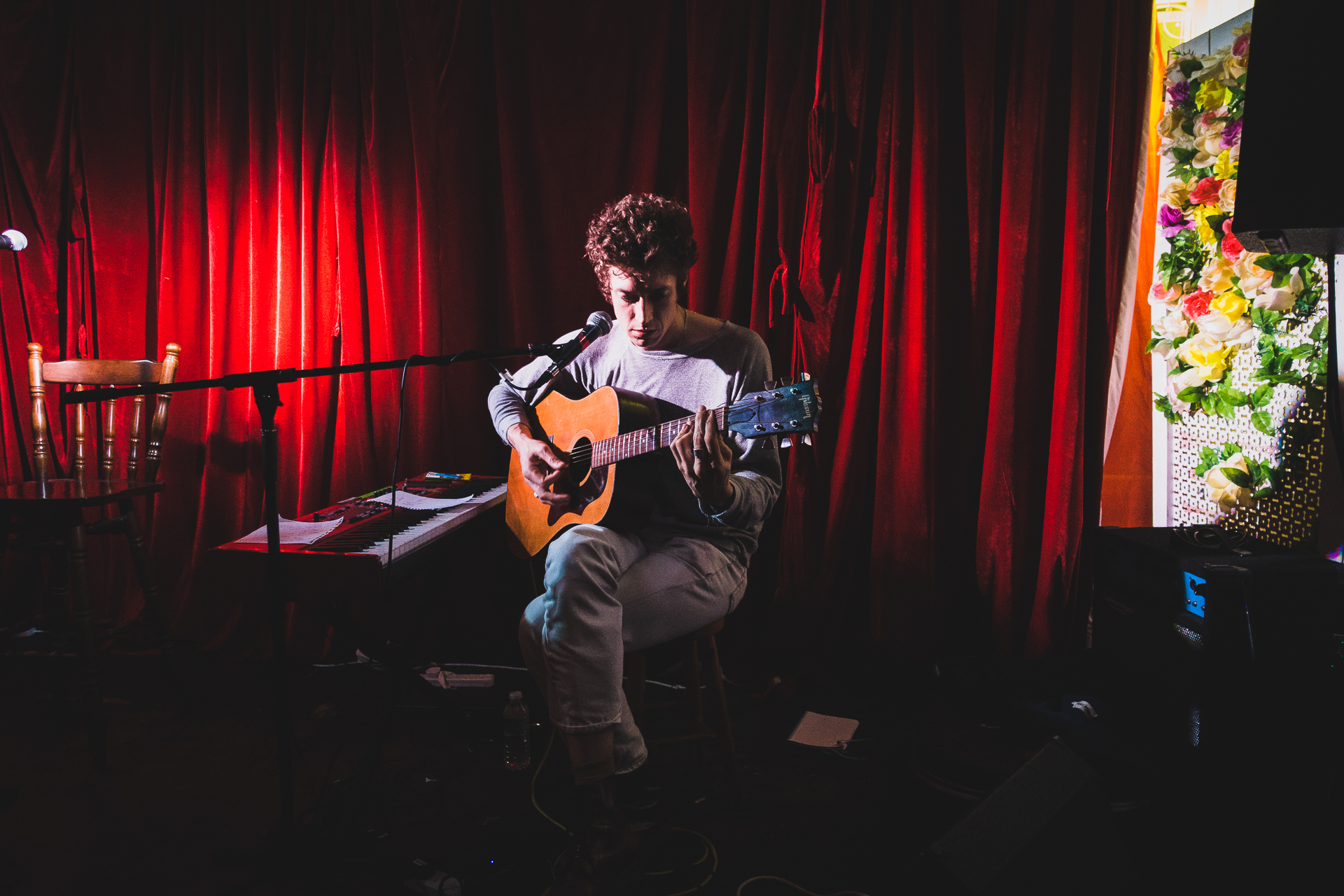
H. Hawkline onstage at the venue in 2016.

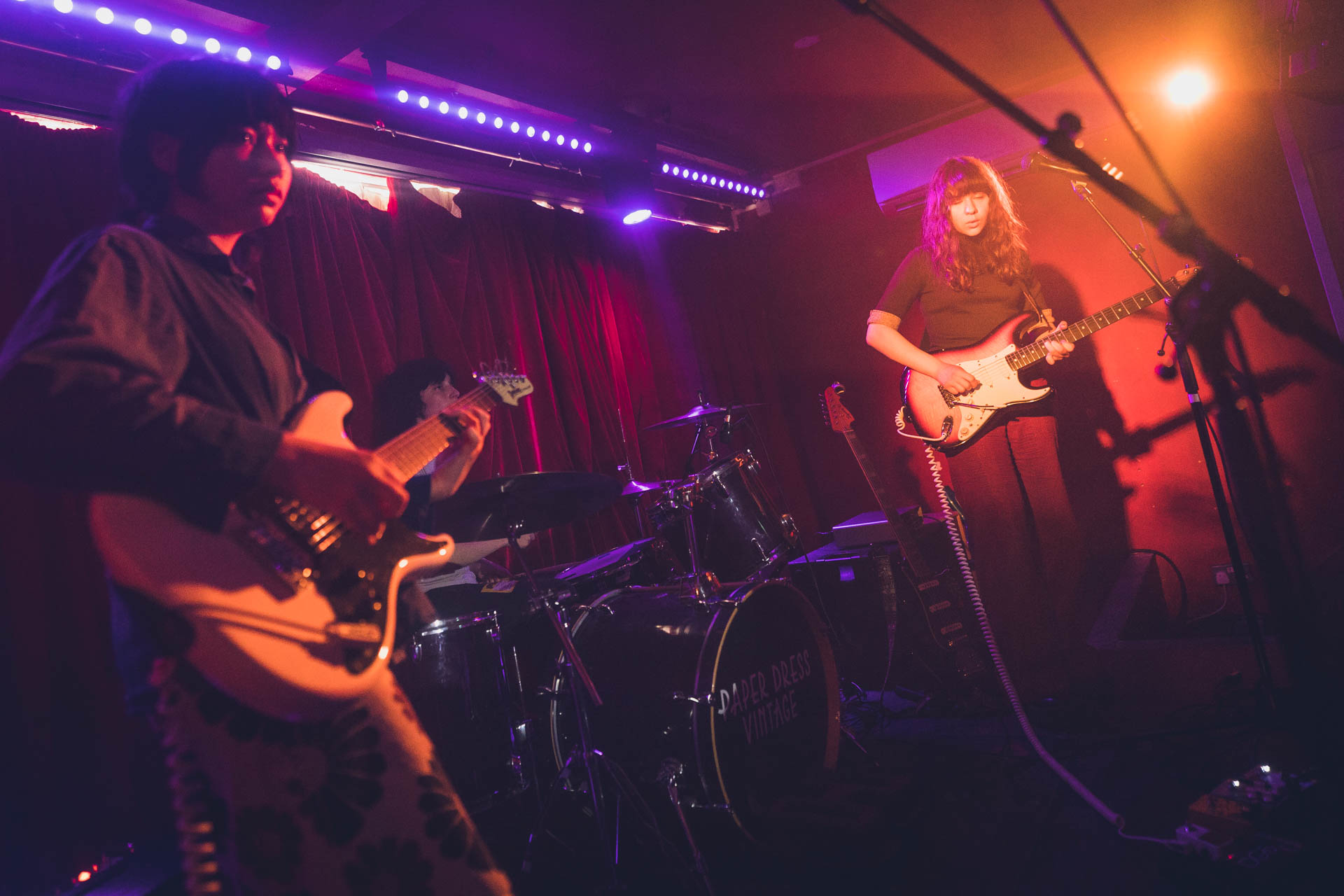
Horsegirl onstage at the venue in 2022.

- Aldous Harding
- Arlo Parks
- Charmpit
- Darren Hayman
- The Ethical Debating Society
- Fightmilk
- Happy Accidents
- H. Hawkline
- Horsegirl
- Me Rex
- Public Service Broadcasting
- Sam Fender
- Slow Club
- Squid
- Teleman
- The Wave Pictures
