= Train on the Island =

Studio album by Aldous Harding
- Released: 8 May 2026
- Studio: Rockfield (Wye Valley)
- Length: 39:24
- Labels: 4AD; Flying Nun
- Producer: John Parish

Aldous Harding chronology
Warm Chris (2022)	Train on the Island (2026)

Singles from Train on the Island
- 1. "One Stop" Released: 3 March 2026; 2. "Venus in the Zinnia" Released: 9 April 2026; 3. "Coats" Released: 6 May 2026

Train on the Island is the fifth studio album by the New Zealand indie folk singer-songwriter Aldous Harding, released on 8 May 2026 through Flying Nun Records in New Zealand and 4AD elsewhere. It was produced by longtime collaborator John Parish, and serves as the follow-up to Harding's 2022 album Warm Chris. The album was preceded by the singles "One Stop", "Venus in the Zinnia", and "Coats".

== Background and promotion ==
Train on the Island was recorded at Rockfield Studios in Wales with longtime collaborator John Parish, continuing a partnership that has spanned Harding's previous three albums over nine years. The album features contributions from several musicians, including pedal steel player Joe Harvey-Whyte, harpist Mali Llywelyn, synthesiser Thomas Poli, and drummer Seb Rochford. Harding is scheduled to tour the album in the UK, US, and Europe during Spring and Summer 2026, before returning to New Zealand for a four-date national tour.

== Critical reception ==
Professional ratings
Aggregate scores
Source	Rating
AnyDecentMusic?	8.1/10
Metacritic	87/100
Review scores
Source	Rating
AllMusic	4.5/5 stars
Exclaim!	9/10
The Guardian	4/5 stars
Mojo	4/5 stars
MusicOMH	3.5/5 stars
Paste	A−
Pitchfork	9.0/10
The Skinny	4/5 stars
Uncut	4/5 stars
Under the Radar	6.5/10

According to the review aggregator Metacritic, Train on the Island received "universal acclaim" based on a weighted average score of 87 out of 100 from 14 critic scores.

Jayson Greene of Pitchfork awarded Train on the Island the accolade Best New Music, describing it as "her career-best album". Greene praised the record for leaving "negative space for our imaginations" through its minimalistic instrumentation, often comprising just "two piano chords, a three-note bassline, two notes on guitar, and a simple drumbeat". He wrote that, as a sum of these elements, the album generates "oceans of implication".

Like others, Tuhin Chakrabarti of Northern Transmissions recognised the title track as the album's center piece. "It feels like motion without destination, [away from] something familiar that you no longer fully belong to. The feeling is not grief exactly. It is recognition."

Writing for Paste, Miranda Wollen highlighted Harding's "signature stripped-back style" and described the album as both "capacious and intimate", calling it a "silly, colorful triumph". The Guardian journalist Alexis Petridis stated that "the most striking thing about said songs isn’t their weirdness, but how tightly written, compact and, in their own understated way, punchy they are".

In a more critical review, Mark Woody of Under the Radar wrote that while the album offers "some interesting scenery", it is overall a "mixed bag" and ranks near the end of Harding's "otherwise impressive catalog", with "a few too many unexciting turnouts". He also commented that "maybe too much time [is] spent with the same collaborators".

== Track listing ==
All tracks are written by Aldous Harding.

Train on the Island track listing
No.	Title	Length
1.	"I Ate the Most"	4:06
2.	"One Stop"	3:30
3.	"Train on the Island"	5:35
4.	"Worms"	3:53
5.	"Venus in the Zinnia" (featuring H. Hawkline)	3:17
6.	"If Lady Does It"	4:12
7.	"San Francisco"	4:42
8.	"What Am I Gonna Do?"	3:44
9.	"Riding That Symbol"	2:57
10.	"Coats"	3:28
Total length:		39:24

== Personnel ==
Credits are adapted from the album's liner notes.

- Aldous Harding – vocals (all tracks), piano (tracks 1–3, 7), Fender Rhodes (1, 7), acoustic guitar (2, 5–7, 9, 10), electric guitar (5)
- John Parish – percussion (1–3, 5, 7, 8, 10), MS-20 synthesiser (2), drums (3–5, 7, 10), acoustic guitar (4), Wurlitzer piano (5), bass (6), toms, Fender Rhodes, vibraphone (8)
- H. Hawkline – guitar, synthesiser (1); bass (2–5, 7, 8, 10), electric guitar (2–4, 7, 10), acoustic guitar (2, 5, 7), piano (4, 6), Hammond organ (4), vocals (5, 10), ARP (6)
- Thomas Poli – Verbos electronics (1, 2, 6, 9)
- Seb Rochford – drums (2, 6, 8)
- Mali Llywelyn – harp (2, 8), piano (6)
- Joe Harvey-Whyte – pedal steel (3, 4, 7, 10)

=== Production ===
- John Parish – production, mixing
- Joe Jones – recording
- Oliver Baldwin – additional recording, mixing
- Jim Bar – additional recording
- H. Hawkline – art direction
- Aldous Harding – photo direction
- Kate Meakin – photography

== Charts ==
Chart performance for Train on the Island
Chart (2026)	Peak position
Australian Albums (ARIA)	41
Belgian Albums (Ultratop Flanders)	108
Dutch Vinyl Albums (Dutch Charts)	29
French Albums (SNEP)	190
Irish Independent Albums (IRMA)	18
New Zealand Albums (RMNZ)	4
Scottish Albums (Official Charts)	18
Swiss Albums (Schweizer Hitparade)	46
UK Albums Sales (OCC)	17
UK Independent Albums (Official Charts)	9
