= Designer (album) =

Studio album by Aldous Harding
- Released: 26 April 2019
- Studios: Rockfield Studios (Rockfield, Monmouthshire, Wales)
- Length: 40:32
- Labels: 4AD; Flying Nun
- Producer: John Parish

Aldous Harding chronology
Party (2017)	Designer (2019)	Warm Chris (2022)

Singles from Designer
- 1. "The Barrel" Released: 2019; 2. "Fixture Picture" Released: 2019

Professional ratings
Aggregate scores
Source	Rating
AnyDecentMusic?	8.2/10
Metacritic	88/100
Review scores
Source	Rating
AllMusic	4.5/5 stars
The Guardian	4/5 stars
The Independent	5/5 stars
Mojo	4/5 stars
NME	4/5 stars
The Observer	4/5 stars
Pitchfork	8.0/10
Q	5/5 stars
Rolling Stone	4/5 stars
Uncut	8/10

Designer is the third studio album by the New Zealand indie folk singer-songwriter Aldous Harding, released on 26 April 2019 by 4AD. The song "The Barrel" won the 2019 APRA Silver Scroll award and the album was a finalist for the 2020 Taite Music Prize.

== Accolades ==
Accolades for Designer
Publication	Accolade	Rank	Ref.
Billboard	Top 50 Albums of 2019 (Mid-Year)	—N/a	
Exclaim!	Top 29 Albums of 2019 (Mid-Year)	28	
Gorilla vs. Bear	Top 20 Albums of 2019 (Mid-Year)	6	
Paste	Top 25 Albums of 2019 (Mid-Year)	23	
Rolling Stone	Top 50 Albums of 2019 (Mid-Year)	—N/a	

== Track listing ==
All tracks are written by Aldous Harding.

Designer track listing
No.	Title	Length
1.	"Fixture Picture"	4:07
2.	"Designer"	4:16
3.	"Zoo Eyes"	5:17
4.	"Treasure"	4:11
5.	"The Barrel"	4:59
6.	"Damn"	6:27
7.	"Weight of the Planets"	4:43
8.	"Heaven Is Empty"	3:19
9.	"Pilot"	3:13
Total length:		40:32

== Personnel ==
- Aldous Harding – vocals, acoustic and classical guitar
- John Parish – acoustic and electric guitar, piano, organ, mellotron, drums, congas, percussion, mixing
- H. Hawkline – bass guitar, electric guitar, synthesizer, vocal percussion, design, layout
- Gwion Llewelyn – drums, vocals
- Stephen Black – tenor, baritone and alto saxophone, clarinet, bass clarinet
- Clare Mactaggart – violin
- Jared Samuel – celesta on "Damn"

== Charts ==
Chart performance for Designer
Chart (2019)	Peak position
Australian Albums (ARIA)	53
Austrian Albums (Ö3 Austria)	45
Belgian Albums (Ultratop Flanders)	22
Belgian Albums (Ultratop Wallonia)	96
French Albums (SNEP)	101
German Albums (Offizielle Top 100)	98
New Zealand Albums (RMNZ)	5
Portuguese Albums (AFP)	27
Scottish Albums (Official Charts)	15
Swiss Albums (Schweizer Hitparade)	89
UK Albums (Official Charts)	33
UK Album Downloads (Official Charts)	30
UK Americana Albums (Official Charts)	3
UK Independent Albums (Official Charts)	7
US Heatseekers Albums (Billboard)	10
US Independent Albums (Billboard)	29
