= Swordfish (Merk album) =

2016 album by Merk

Studio album by Merk
- Released: 18 November 2016
- Recorded: April–October 2016
- Genres: Alternative pop; indie pop; psychedelic pop
- Length: 28:03
- Labels: Flying Out; Dew Process
- Producer: Mark Perkins

Singles from Swordfish
- 1. "No Better Reason" Released: 19 May 2016; 2. "Manchuria" Released: 3 June 2016; 3. "I'm Easy" Released: 26 August 2016; 4. "Ash & Sand" Released: 10 November 2016; 5. "Lucky Dilemma" Released: 2 May 2018

Swordfish is the debut studio album by New Zealand pop musician Merk released on 18 November 2016 by Dew Process and Flying Out. It was written and produced by Merk under his real name, Mark Perkins.

== Background and promotion ==
Merk's debut single "No Better Reason" was released to his SoundCloud on 19 May 2016. His second single "Manchuria" was released on 3 June. The third single "I'm Easy" was released on 26 August; a music video was released beforehand on 30 March. His fourth single off the album "Ash & Sand" was released just on his SoundCloud similar to his first.

Swordfish was then released on 18 November in CD, digital download, and limited run cassette tape formats.

"Lucky Dilemma" a single released on 2 May 2018, was later added to subsequent reissues of Swordfish.

== Writing and composition ==
The albums genres are categorised as alternative pop, indie pop, and psychedelic pop. The track "Treehouse Club" is about human's overall sense of dissatisfaction and how they're all waiting for something better. Mark Perkins said, "our natural tendency is to either be consumed by the future or the past." Perkins describes "Lucky Dilemma" as being about "the paradox of choice - sometimes we have so many options it's crippling instead of empowering."

Merk stated it took him about six months to record the album and that he made five alternate versions to every song.

== Critical reception ==
Felix Mpunga from NZ Musician praised the album, particularly "how Merk [sic] managed to keep his project short and sweet at 25 minutes, whilst showing off his skills as musician and producer." Swordfish won the Independent Music NZ's inaugural Auckland Live Best Independent Debut award in 2017.

== Track listing ==
Track listing adapted from iTunes.

All tracks are written by Merk, except where noted.

No.	Title	Writer(s)	Length
1.	"Wonderbuzz"		1:09
2.	"No Better Reason"	Mark Perkins, Ben Jeffares	2:26
3.	"Treehouse Club"		3:53
4.	"Melody"		1:52
5.	"Manchuria"		3:39
6.	"Eat a Lemon Tart"		2:18
7.	"I'm Easy"	Perkins, Jeffares	3:30
8.	"Treehouse2"		1:39
9.	"Ash & Sand"	Perkins, Alexander Wildwood	3:37
10.	"Love is a Real Thing"		3:57
11.	"Lucky Dilemma"		3:10
Total length:			28:03

== Personnel ==
Adapted from BandCamp.

- Mark Perkins (Merk) – vocals, instruments, writing, producer, mixing, album artwork
- Alice Crowe – cello (track 4)
- Ben Jeffares – co-writer (tracks 2 & 7)
- Alexander Wildwood – co-writer (track 9)
- Djeisan Suskov – mastering
- Shannon Fowler – mastering (track 11)
- Steph Norman – album artwork

== Charts ==
Chart (2016)	Peak position
NZ Heatseeker Albums (ONZM)	3
