= The Old Queens Head =

The Old Queen's Head Public House
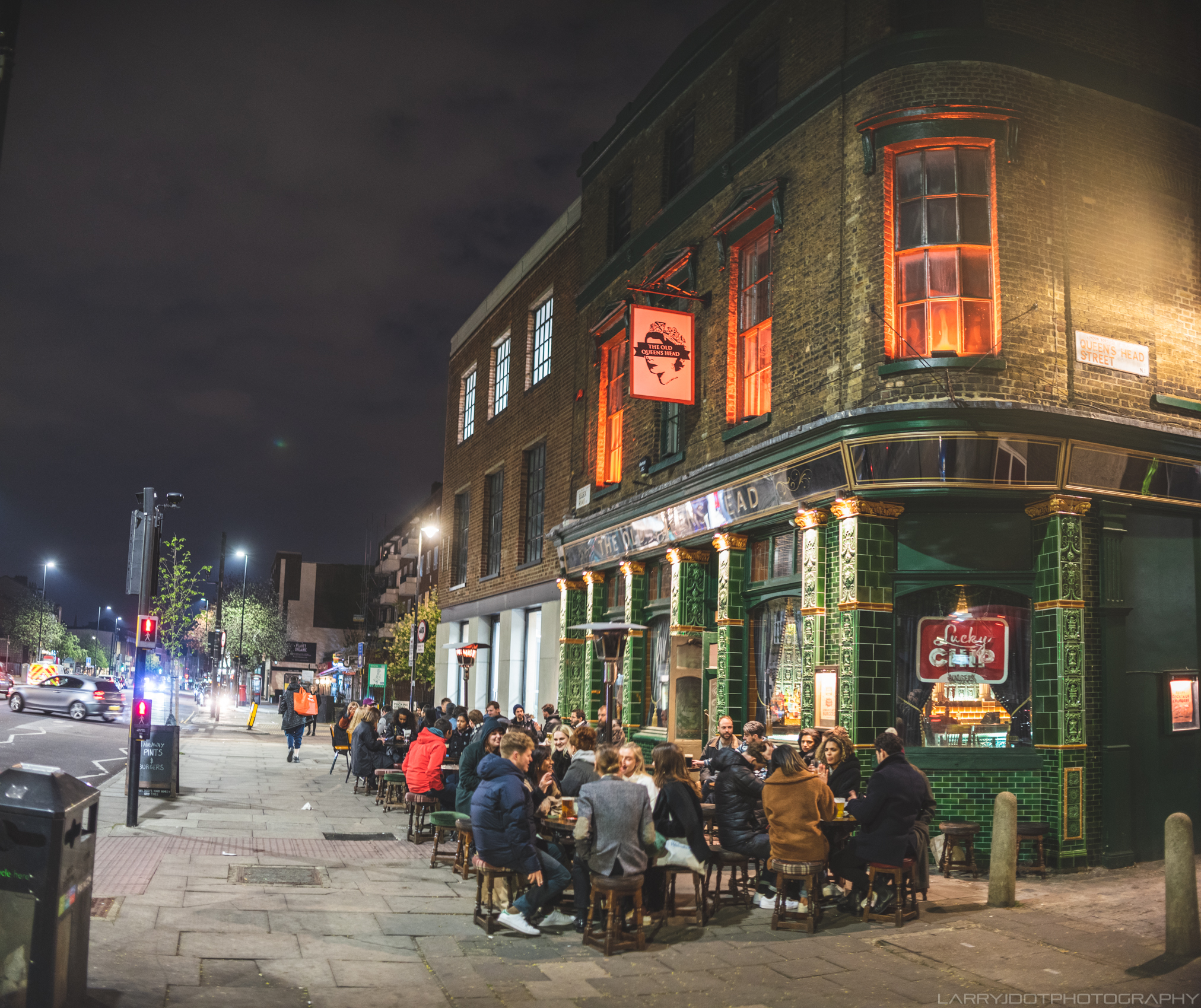
- The Old Queen's Head Public House
- Interactive map of The Old Queen's Head Public House
- Location: 44 Essex Road, Islington, London N1
- Coordinates: 51.5373°N 0.100447°W
- Area: London Borough of Islington
- Built: c. 1830, but with early 17th-century interior
- Architectural styles: brick and stucco public house

Listed Building – Grade II
- Designated: 20 September 1954
- Reference no.: 1195587

The Old Queen's Head is a pub on Essex Road in Islington, London N1. Its shopfront is scheduled as "to be retained" by Islington Council. Since 2006 The Old Queens Head has been a part of The Columbo Group, owned by Steve Ball and Riz Shaikh. It is a Grade II listed building.

== Listed building ==
The Old Queen's Head is a public house dating to about 1830; the pub front on the ground floor dates to about 1900. The interior contains some early 17th-century features from an earlier building on the site.

The three storey building is of Flemish bond yellow brick with a stucco cornice; a stepped parapet hides the pitched roof. There is a range of three windows facing Essex Road and three to Queen's Head Street; one window faces the corner, which is curved.

There is an early 17th-century moulded plaster ceiling inside the pub. The ceiling is decorated with ornamental bands around panels that contain emblems. There is a wood and stone chimneypiece of the same age. Figures on either side of the stone hearth support an entablature bearing two carved scenes. The upper part of the chimneypiece is similarly decorated, ending in a frieze and cornice.

== History ==
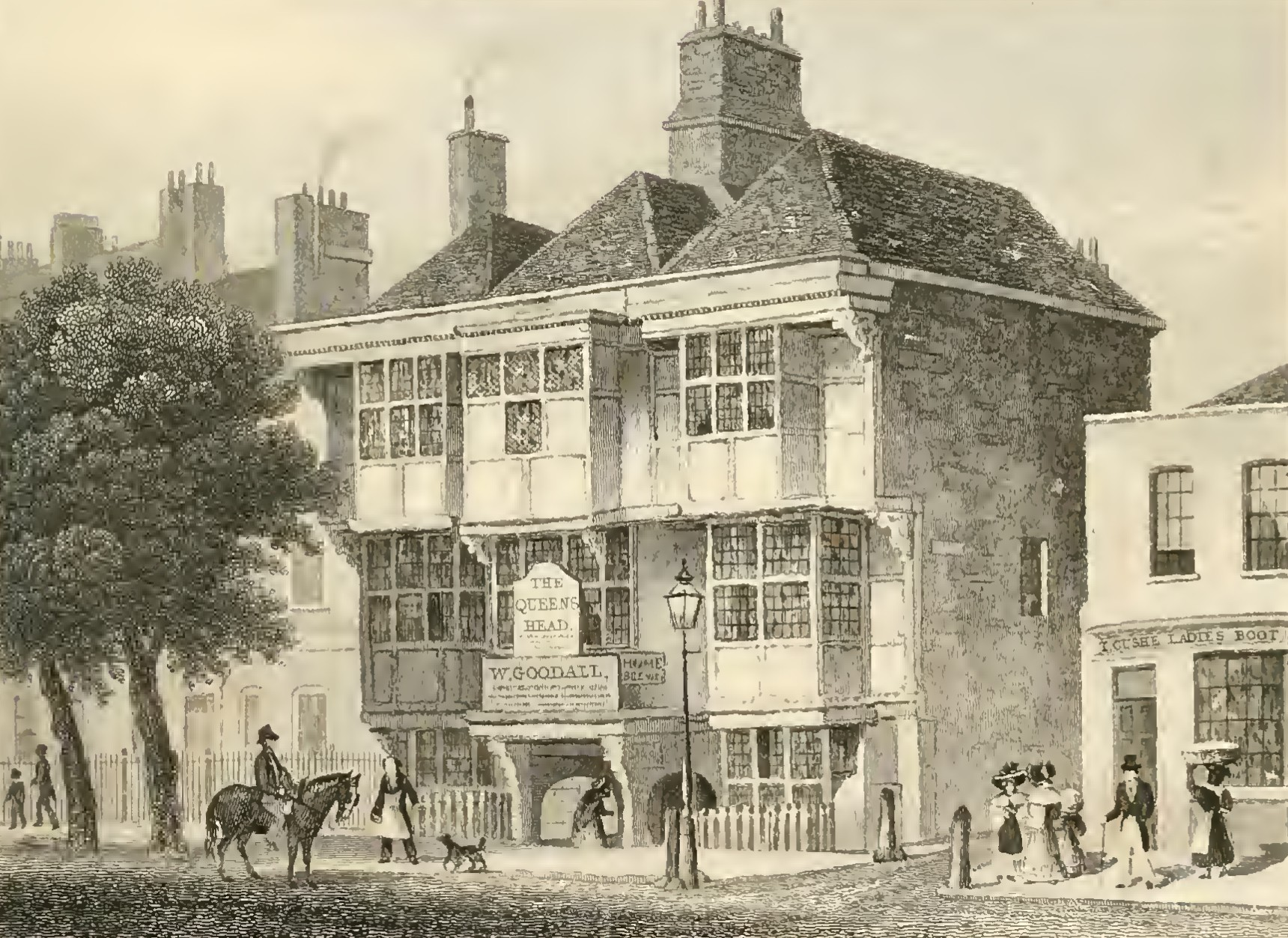
The original public house until 1829

The previous pub on the site was demolished in 1829. It was described by Walter Thornbury, writing in the 1870s, as

a strong wood and plaister building of three lofty storeys, projecting over each other in front, and forming bay windows, supported by brackets and carved figures. The centre, which projected several feet beyond the other part of the building, and formed a commodious porch, to which there was a descent of several steps, was supported in front by caryatides of carved oak, standing on either side of the entrance, and crowned with Ionic scrolls.

Thornbury describes the interior with the surviving fireplace in detail:

The interior of the house was constructed in a similar manner to that of most of the old buildings in the parish, having oak-panelled wainscots and stuccoed ceilings. The principal room was the parlour already alluded to, the ceiling of which was ornamented with dolphins, cherubs, acorns, &c., surrounded by a wreathed border of fruit and foliage, and had, near the centre, a medallion, of a character apparently Roman, crowned with bays, and a small shield containing the initials I. M. surrounded by cherubim and glory. The chimneypiece was supported by two figures carved in stone, hung with festoons, &c., and the stone slab, immediately over the fireplace, exhibited the stories of Danae and Actaeon in relief, with mutilated figures of Venus, Bacchus, and Plenty.

== Ghosts and legends ==
According to Absolute Publishing's London Visitor Guide, an unattributed rumour is that The Old Queen's Head is haunted like many London pubs, supposedly by both a woman and a girl in Tudor clothes.

Thornbury, writing in 1878, also mentions the pub's alleged connection with Sir Walter Raleigh, though he denied its validity:

Tradition had long connected this house with the name of Sir Walter Raleigh, though with no sufficient reason. In the thirtieth year of Elizabeth, Sir Walter obtained a patent to make licences for keeping of taverns and retailing of wines throughout England. This house may be one of those to which Raleigh granted licences, and the sign then marked the reign in which it was granted.

== Bibliography ==
- Cromwell, Thomas (1835). Walks through Islington: comprising an historical and descriptive account of that extensive and important district, both in its ancient and present state: together with some particulars of the most remarkable objects immediately adjacent. London: Sherwood, Gilbert & Piper. p. 233. OCLC 227976083.
- Thornbury, Walter (1872–1878). Old and New London, A Narrative of Its History, Its People, and Its Places. Illustrated with Numerous Engravings from the Most Authentic Sources. Vol. 2. London: Cassell Petter & Galpin & Co. p. 260. hdl:10427/14805. OCLC 7218197.
