= USS Swordfish =

Two submarines of the United States Navy have been named USS Swordfish after the swordfish, a large fish with a long, swordlike beak and a high dorsal fin.

- USS Swordfish (SS-193), a Sargo-class submarine commissioned in 1939 and sunk in 1945, was the first United States submarine to sink a Japanese ship during World War II.
- USS Swordfish (SSN-579), a Skate-class submarine in commission from 1958 to 1989, is accused by Russia of ramming and sinking the Soviet submarine K-129 during the Cold War (see Project Jennifer).
