= Haydon Spenceley =

- Born: 3 July 1984 (age 42)
- Origin: Northampton, England
- Genres: Worship, CEDM, CCM, Christian rock
- Occupations: Singer, songwriter, worship leader, pianist
- Instruments: vocals, piano
- Years active: 2003–present
- Formerly of: Freeslave
- Website: haydonspenceley.com

Haydon Spenceley (born 3 July 1984) is an English Christian musician and worship leader, who plays a Christian pop and EDM style of worship music. He has released three studio albums: Circles (2008), Heart Strings (2010), and Mirrors (2014).

== Early life and personal life ==
Haydon Spenceley was born on 3 July 1984, while now he resides in Northampton, England. He has cerebral palsy, where this involves the use of a wheelchair for his mobility. He is an ordained minister in the Church of England.

== Music career ==
His music recording career commenced in 2003, with the Christian alternative rock band, Freeslave, where he was their lead singer. He released, Circles, a studio album, on 10 February 2008. The subsequent studio album, Heart Strings, was released on 4 October 2010. Spenceley released, Mirrors, on 4 August 2014.

== Discography ==
Studio albums

- Circles (10 February 2008)
- Heart Strings (4 October 2010)
- Mirrors (4 August 2014)
