= APRA Awards (New Zealand) =

New Zealand music awards

APRA Music Awards (New Zealand)
- Current: 2024 APRA Silver Scroll Awards
- Country: New Zealand
- Presented by: Australasian Performing Right Association (APRA)
- First award: 1965
- Website: www.apraamcos.co.nz/music-creators/awards

The APRA Music Awards are several annual and two-yearly award ceremonies run in New Zealand by Australasian Performing Right Association to recognise songwriting skills of its members. APRA hold the annual Silver Scroll Awards and song awards, selects an inductee into the New Zealand Music Hall of Fame, and makes five professional development awards every year. APRA also runs awards for its Australian members.

== APRA Silver Scroll Awards ==
Each year all songwriters that are members of APRA with a song on general release in the eligibility period can enter the APRA Silver Scroll Award. For the APRA Silver Scroll Award, a judging panel of APRA members decides a shortlist of songs, which is then voted on by APRA's wider membership of 10,000+ songwriters and composers. The votes of the wider APRA membership decide the winner and finalists for the APRA Silver Scroll Award. The APRA Silver Scroll Award is awarded purely on the basis of songwriting.

=== Silver Scroll award ===
Silver Scroll winners are announced annually.

Year	Songwriter	Performer	Song	Ref.
1965	Wayne Kent-Healey	Herma Keil & The Keil Isles	"Teardrops"	
1966	Ray Columbus	Ray Columbus	"I Need You"	
1967	Roger Skinner	Larry's Rebels	"Let's Think of Something"	
1968	David Jordan	David Jordan	"I Shall Take My Leave"	
1969	David Jordan	The Avengers	"Out of Sight, Out of Mind"	
1970	Wayne Mason	The Fourmyula	"Nature"	
1971	Corben Simpson	Littlejohn	"Have You Heard a Man Cry?"	
1972	Stephen Robinson	Tamburlaine	"Lady Wakes Up"	
1973	Ray Columbus and Mike Harvey	Ray Columbus and Mike Harvey	"Jangles, Spangles and Banners"	
1974	John Hanlon	John Hanlon	"Lovely Lady"	
1975	John Hanlon	John Hanlon	"Windsongs"	
1976	Mike Harvey	Salty Dogg	"All Gone Away"	
1977	Lea Maalfrid	Lea Maalfrid	"Lavender Mountain"	
1978	Steve Allen	Steve Allen	"Why Do They?"	
1979	Sharon O'Neill	Sharon O'Neill	"Face in a Rainbow"	
1980	Paul Schreuder	Paul Schreuder	"You've Got Me Loving You"	
1981 (Note: No award was presented in 1981. At the 2015 awards APRA retrospectively presented 1981's "Lost Scroll".)	Phil Judd, Wayne Stevens and Mark Hough	The Swingers	"Counting the Beat"	
1982	Stephen Young	Mother Goose	"I Can't Sing Very Well"	
1983	Stephen Bell-Booth	Stephen Bell-Booth	"All I Want Is You"	
1984	Hammond Gamble - Winner Silver Scroll Wayne Gillespie - Special APRA Award	Hammond Gamble Wayne Gillespie	"Look What Midnight's Done to Me" "Away With You"	
1985	Malcolm Black and Nick Sampson	Netherworld Dancing Toys	"For Today"	
1986	Tony Waine	The Narcs	"Abandoned By Love"	
1987	Dave Dobbyn	Dave Dobbyn	"You Oughta Be In Love"	
1988	Shona Laing	Shona Laing	"Soviet Snow"	
1989	Stephen Bell-Booth	Stephen Bell-Booth	"Hand It Over"	
1990	Guy Wishart	Guy Wishart	"Don't Take Me For Granted"	
1991	Rikki Morris	Rikki Morris	"Heartbroke"	
1992	Shona Laing	Shona Laing	"Mercy of Love"	
1993	Dave Dobbyn	Dave Dobbyn	"Belle of the Ball"	
1994	Don McGlashan	The Mutton Birds	"Anchor Me"	
1995	Mark Tierney, Paul Casserly, and Anthony Ioasa	Strawpeople	"Sweet Disorder"	
1996	Bic Runga	Bic Runga	"Drive"	
1997	Greg Johnson	Greg Johnson	"Liberty"	
1998	Dave Dobbyn	Dave Dobbyn	"Beside You"	
1999	Bill Urale	King Kapisi	"Reverse Resistance"	
2000	Chris Knox	Chris Knox	"My Only Friend"	
2001	Neil Finn	Neil Finn with Sheryl Crow	"Turn and Run"	
2002	Che Ness and Godfrey de Grut	Che Fu	"Misty Frequencies"	
2003	Donald McNulty, Te Awanui Reeder, David Atai, Junior Rikiau and Feleti Strickson-Pua	Nesian Mystik	"For the People"	
2004	Malo Luafutu and Peter Wadams	Scribe	"Not Many"	
2005	Dann Hume, Peter Hume and Jon Hume	Evermore	"It's Too Late"	
2006	Don McGlashan	Mt Raskil Preservation Society feat Hollie Smith	"Bathe In the River"	
2007	Brooke Fraser	Brooke Fraser	"Albertine"	
2008	Jason Kerrison, Bobby Kennedy, Matt Treacy and Clinton Harris	Opshop	"One Day"	
2009	James Milne and Luke Buda	Lawrence Arabia	"Apple Pie Bed"	
2010	Aaron Short, Thom Powers and Alisa Xayalith	The Naked and Famous	"Young Blood"	
2011	Dave Baxter	Avalanche City	"Love Love Love"	
2012	Stephanie Brown	Lips	"Everything To Me"	
2013	Ella Yelich-O’Connor and Joel Little	Lorde	"Royals"	
2014	Tami Neilson & Jay (Joshua) Neilson	Tami Neilson	"Walk (Back To Your Arms)"	
2015	Ruban Nielson, Kody Nielson	Unknown Mortal Orchestra	"Multi-Love"	
2016	Revoked (Note: Thomas Oliver's Silver Scroll was revoked in 2021 after he admitted to grabbing a woman by the neck at 2017 Aotearoa Music Awards.)			
2017	Ella Yelich O'Connor, Jack Antonoff and Joel Little	Lorde	"Green Light"	
2018	Marlon Williams	Marlon Williams feat. Aldous Harding	"Nobody Gets What They Want Anymore"	
2019	Aldous Harding	Aldous Harding	"The Barrel"	
2020	Stella Bennett, Joshua Fountain and Djeisan Suskov	Benee	"Glitter"	
2021	Troy Kingi	Troy Kingi	"All Your Ships Have Sailed"	
2022	Rob Ruha, Kaea Hills, Te Amorutu Broughton, Ainsley Tai, Dan Martin, Whenua Patuwai	Ka Hao and Rob Ruha	"35"	
2023	Benjamin Sinclair, Elizabeth Stokes, Jonathan Pearce, Tristan Deck	The Beths	"Expert in a Dying Field"	
2024	Anna Coddington	Anna Coddington	"Kātuarehe"	
2025	Marlon Williams, Te Pononga Tamati-Elliffe (KOMMI)	Marlon Williams	"Aua Atu Rā"	
2026	David Feauai-Afaese, Navakatoa Tekela-Pule, Levi Gemmell, Larsen Taylor	LEAO	"LALELEI"	

=== APRA Maioha Award ===
Established in 2003, the APRA Maioha Award recognises contemporary Māori music. The winner receives a $5000 cash prize and is the annual guardian of award sculpture Te Ngore, crafted by sculptor Brian Flintoff.

Year	Winner	Song	Ref.
2003	Ngaiwi Apanui	"Wharikihia"	
2004	Ruia Aperahama	"E Tae"	
2005	Anituatua Black & Whirimako Black	"Tini Whetu"	
2006	Richard Bennett	"E Hine"	
2007	Andrea Tunks & Pierre Tohe	"Aio"	
2008	Ruia Aperahama	"Rere Reta Rere Reta"	
2009	Rewi Spraggon & Riki Bennett	"Tapapakanga"	
2010	Jamie Greenslade	"Sin City"	
2011	Tyna Keelan	"Ko Koe"	
2012	Te Awanui Reeder, David Atai & Scotty Morrison	"Matahīapo"	
2013	Maisey Rika, Te Kahautu Maxwell, and Mahuia Bridgman-Cooper	"Ruaimoko"	
2014	Rob Ruha	"Tiki Tapu"	
2015	Vince Harder, Stan Walker, and Troy Kingi	"Aotearoa"	
2016	Rob Ruha	"Kariri"	
2017	Lewis de Jong, Henry de Jong, and Ethan Trembath (Alien Weaponry)	"Raupatu"	
2018	Ria Hall, Tiki Taane, and Te Ori Paki	"Te Ahi Kai Pō"	
2019	Tyna Keelan, Angelique Te Rauna and Matauranga Te Rauna	"Ka Ao"	
2020	Rob Ruha	"Ka Mānu"	
2021	Maisey Rika, Seth Haapu	"Waitī Waitā"	
2022	Aja Ropata, Byllie-Jean, and Chris Wethey	"Te Iho"	
2023	Mohi Allen, Hēmi Kelly, Amy Boroevich, Noema Te Hau III (MOHI)	"Me Pēhea Rā"	
2024	Jordyn Rapana, Dan Martin, Ruth Smith, Kawiti Waetford (Jordyn with a Why)	"He Rei Niho"	
2025	Dillistrate	"Kei Whati Te Marama"	
2026	Emily and Charles Looker (Aro)	"Puna Ora"	

=== SOUNZ Contemporary Award ===
Established in 1998 and supported by SOUNZ, the centre for New Zealand music, the SOUNZ Contemporary Award recognises works by New Zealand composers. The winner received a $3000 cash prize and a trophy designed by sculptor Sarah Smuts-Kennedy.

Year	Winner	Song	Ref.
1998	Eve de Castro-Robinson	"Chaos of Delight"	
1999	Gillian Whitehead	"Outrageous Fortune"	
2000	Ross Harris	"To the Memory of I. S. Totzka"	
2001	Gillian Whitehead	"The Improbable Ordered Dance for Orchestra"	
2002	John Psathas	"View From Olympus"	
2003	Gillian Whitehead	"Alice"	
2004	John Psathas	"Piano Concerto"	
2005	Ross Harris	"Labyrinth for Tuba and Orchestra"	
2006	Ross Harris	"Symphony No. 2"	
2007	Eve de Castro-Robinson	"These Arms to Hold You"	
2008	Chris Gendall	"Wax Lyrical"	
2009	Ross Harris	"Symphony III"	
2010	Chris Cree Brown	"Inner Bellow"	
2011	Lyell Cresswell	"Concerto for Piano and Orchestra"	
2012	Alex Taylor	"[inner]"	
2013	Karlo Margetic	"Lightbox" for piano trio	
2014	Michael Norris	"Inner Phases" for Chinese instrument ensemble and string quartet	
2015	Chris Watson	"sing songs self", a single movement piano concerto	
2016	Salina Fisher	"Rainphase"	
2017	Salina Fisher	"Tōrino - echoes on pūtōrino improvisations by Rob Thorne"	
2018	Michael Norris	Sygyt	
2019	Michael Norris	Sama Violin Concerto	
2020	Michael Norris	"Mātauranga (Rerenga)"	
2021	David Donaldson, Janet Roddick, Steve Roche (Plan 9)	"The Bewilderness"	
2022	Reuben Jelleyman	"Catalogue"	
2023	Victoria Kelly	"Requiem"	
2024	Nathaniel Otley	"the convergence of oceans"	
2025	Ihlara McIndoe	"of coral and foam"	
2026	Dylan Lardelli	"Light Lines"	

=== Tihi o te Maunga Tito ===
Established in 2026, the Tihi o te Maunga Tito award recognises Māori writers and composers for kapa haka.

Year	Winner	Song	Ref
2026	Rob Ruha	"Te Tapuni"	

=== APRA Screen Awards ===
Established in 2014, the APRA Screen Awards consist of the APRA Best Original Music in a Feature Film Award and the APRA Best Original Music in a Series Award, celebrating the work of New Zealand's film composers. As of 2014, the winner of each award receives a $1500 cash prize and is the annual guardian of a trophy.

Year	APRA Best Original Music in a Feature Film Award		APRA Best Original Music in a Series Award		Ref.
Year	Composer(s)	Composition	Composer(s)	Composition	Ref.
2014	Victoria Kelly	Field Punishment No. 1	Tom McLeod	Girl vs. Boy (Series 2)	
2015	Grayson Gilmour	Consent	Tom McLeod	Girl vs. Boy (Series 3)	
2016	Mahuia Bridgman-Cooper and Tama Waipara	Mahana	Karl Steven	800 Words	
2017	Tim Prebble	One Thousand Ropes	Claire Cowan	Hillary	
2018	David Long	McLaren	Conrad Wedde, Lukasz Buda, Samuel Scott	Cleverman	
2019	Mike Newport	Mega Time Squad	Karl Steven	The Bad Seed	
2020	Karl Steven	Come to Daddy	David Long	The Luminaries	
2021	Arli Liberman	Savage	Karl Steven	Black Hands	
2022	Dana Lund and Horomona Horo	Whina	Jonathan Crayford, Joel Tashkoff, Troy Kingi, and Diggy Dupé	The Panthers	
2023	Karl Steven	The Subtle Art of Not Giving a #@%!	Tom McLeod	Blood, Sex & Royalty	
2024	Karl Steven, Jason Smith	Never Look Away	Karl Steven, Rob Thorne	Black Coast Vanishings	
2025	Arli Liberman and Tiki Taane	Ka Whawhai Tonu – Struggle Without End	Mahuia Bridgman-Cooper	The Gone (Season 2)	
2026	Karl Steven	Pike River	Claire Cowan	Bust Up	

=== Most Performed New Zealand Work in New Zealand and Internationally ===
Between 1994 and 2015, APRA also awarded the New Zealand songs most played in New Zealand and around the world each year. While the national award was highly contested, from 2000 to 2012 the international award was dominated by Crowded House's 1986 song "Don't Dream It's Over".

== New Zealand Music Hall of Fame ==
Created in 2007 in conjunction with the Recording Industry Association of New Zealand (RIANZ), the New Zealand Music Hall of Fame pays tribute to those who have "shaped, influenced and advanced popular music in New Zealand." Two musicians or groups are inducted into the hall each year, one at the APRA Silver Scroll Awards, decided by APRA, and the other is the winner of the Legacy Award at the New Zealand Music Awards (NZMAs), selected by RIANZ.

== APRA Song Awards ==
Separate to the Silver Scroll awards, APRA recognises New Zealand songwriting in four specific genres.

=== APRA Best Country Music Song ===
Established in 2004, the APRA Best Country Music Song is presented as part of the NZ Country Music Awards at the annual Gold Guitar celebrations of New Zealand country music.

Year	Winner	Song	Ref
2004	Donna Dean	"Work It Out"	
2005	Kylie Harris	"Give Me Something To Go On"	
2006	Jools Topp (Topp Twins)	"Tamworth"	
2007	Barry Saunders	"Pale Sun"	
2008	Bruce Dennis	"Ain't Gonna Run"	
2009	Jess Chambers (Woolshed Sessions)	"Stringing Me Along"	
2010	Matt Langley	"7:13"	
2011	Donna Dean	"What Am I Gonna Do?"	
2012	Delaney Davidson	"You're A Loser"	
2013	Marlon Williams & Delaney Davidson	"Bloodletter"	
2014	Tami Neilson & Delaney Davidson	"Whiskey & Kisses"	
2015	Kaylee Bell & Jared Porter	"Pieces"	
2016	Mel Parsons	"Alberta Sun"	
2017	Chester Travis	"Toothache"	
2018	Reb Fountain	"Hopeful and Hopeless"	
2019	Holly Arrowsmith	"Slow Train Creek"	
2020	Tami Neilson	"Hey Bus Driver"	
2021	Tami Neilson	"Queenie Queenie"	
2022	Jenny Mitchell, Tami Neilson, Tali Jenkinson, and Chris Wethey	"Trouble Finds A Girl"	
2023	Tami Neilson & Delaney Davidson	"Beyond the Stars"	
2024	Holly Arrowsmith	"Desert Dove"	
2025	Holly Arrowsmith	"Blue Dreams"	

=== APRA Best Pacific Song ===
Established in 2005, the APRA Best Pacific Song award celebrates Pacific music. It is presented as part of the annual Pacific Music Awards.

Year	Writer(s)	Performer	Song	Ref
2005	Kas Futialo & Ian Seumanu	Tha Feelstyle	"Su'amalie"	
2006	Savage	Savage	"Swing"	
2007	Spacifix	Spacifix	"Gotta Get Like This"	
2008	Malo Luafutu (Scribe) with Tyra Hammond, Jordan Iusitini & Aaron Iusitini	Scribe featuring Tyra Hammond	"Say It Again"	
2009	Donald McNulty, Te Awanui Reeder, David Atai, Junior Rikiau, Feleti Strickson-Pua & Heath Manukau	Nesian Mystik	"Nesian 101"	
2010	Tonga Vaea and Three Houses Down	Three Houses Down	"Kanikapila"	
2011	Donald McNulty, Te Awanui Reeder, David Atai, Junior Rikiau, Feleti Strickson-Pua & Heath Manukau	Nesian Mystik	"Sun Goes Down"	
2012	Nainz and Viiz Tupa’i	Adeaze	"Paradise"	
2013	Aaradhna Patel	Aaradhna	"Wake Up"	
2014	Mark Vanilau	Mark Vanilau	"Giant of the Sea"	
2015	Sid Diamond, Fred Fa'Afou, Tyree Tautogia, Joshua Fountain, Pieter Tuhoro	Smashproof	"Survivors" (featuring Pieter T)	
2016	Annie Tonumali’i and Pearl Va’afusuaga	Annie Grace	"E Le Galo"	
2017	Aaradhna Patel	Aaradhna	"Brown Girl"	
2018	Charlie Pome'e and Nicholas Pome'e	General Fiyah	"Here To Stay"	
2019	Kingdon Chapple-Wilson	Kings	"6 Figures"	
2020	Metitilani Alo and Livingstone Efu	Lani Alo	"Alo I Ou Faiva"	
2021	Joshua Nanai, Phil Greiss, Jason Desrouleaux, and Jacob Kasher Hindlin	Jawsh 685	"Savage Love (Laxed – Siren Beat)"	
2022	Daniel Latu, Amon McGoram, Isaiah Libeau, Lomez Brown, and Samuel Verlinden	SWIDT	"Kelz Garage"	
2023	Victor J Sefo, Ventry Parker, Elijah Tovio	Victor J Sefo	"685"	
2024	Aaradhna Patel	Aaradhna	"She"	
2025	Shane Walker	Shane Walker	"Believe"	

=== APRA Best Maori Songwriter ===
Established in 2008, the APRA Best Maori Songwriter award celebrates Māori music. It is presented as part of the annual Waiata Maori Music Awards.

Year	Writer	Ref
2008	Ruia Aperahama	
2009	Donald McNulty, Te Awanui Reeder, David Atai, Junior Rikiau, Feleti Strickson-Pua & Heath Manukau (Nesian Mystik)	
2010	Maisey Rika	
2011	Tiki Taane	
2012	Te Awanui Reeder	
2013	Maisey Rika	
2014	Rob Ruha	
2015	Ranea Aperahama	
2016	Rob Ruha	
2017	Maisey Rika	
2018	Seth Haapu	
2019	Amba Holly	
2020	Brad Kora, Stuart Kora, Joel Shadbolt, Ara Adams-Tamatea & Miharo Gregory (L.A.B.)	
2021	Troy Kingi	
2022	Coterie	
2023	Tatana Tuari, Tame Tuari, & Haami Tuare (Tuari Brothers)	
2024	Mahina Lawrence	

=== APRA Children's Song of the Year ===
Established in 2008, the APRA Best Children's Song award celebrates songwriters and composers who write for New Zealand children. APRA also sponsors the NZ On Air Best Children's Music Video award. The awards were previously presented at the annual StarFest event, as part of the annual KidsFest festival in Christchurch, then as of 2014 they were presented live on What Now and are now celebrated at an invite only music industry event in Auckland each NZ Music Month (May). The winning song wins a $10,000 special NZ On Air grant for producing new music and visual content, while the winning video receives a $500 prize.

In 2024, APRA introduced Preschool (He Manu Pīpī) and Primary (He Pī Ka Rere) sub-categories of the award.

Year	Winner	Song	Ref
2008	Craig Smith, "Wonky Donkey" and Claudia Robin Gunn	"Lullaby Time"	
2009	Levity Beet	"Little Blue"	
2010	Claudia Robin Gunn	"Home Sweet Home"	
2011	Rob Wigley	"Beans About Beans"	
2012	Levity Beet	"Sometimes I Make Mistakes"	
2013	Chanelle Davis	"If I Was a Fuzzy Buzzy Bumblebee"	
2014	Anika Moa	"Colours are Beautiful"	
2015	Levity Beet and Daniel Stryczek	"There's One in the Bush"	
2016	Lucy Hiku & Jenny Payne (Itty Bitty Beats)	"Pō Mārie"	
2017	Jeremy Dillon & Ben Sinclair (Moe & Friends)	"We Like Pets!"	
2018	Craig Smith	"The Scariest Thing In The Garden"	
2019	Cy Winstanley (Simon Stanley)	"Marley Sitting On A Pumpkin Seed"	
2020	Kath Bee and Doug Stenhouse (Joelle)	"I Love Life"	
2021	Michal Bush, Andrew Knopp, and Victoria Knopp	"Brave"	
2022	Kath Bee, Ryan Beehre, and Luke Epapara (Mika Elley and Kurnel MC)	"E Tū Tāngata - Stand Together"	
2023	Lavina Williams & Mark Casey (Jaya)	"Aotearoa Sun"	

==== APRA Children's Song of the Year - Preschool (He Manu Pīpī) ====
Year	Winner	Song	Ref
2024	Levity Beet & Judi Cranston	"Funny Little Bunny – The Springtime Action Song"	
2025	Siu Williams-Lemi (Leah Williams-Partington and Siu Williams-Lemi)	"Lele Means Run"	

==== APRA Children's Song of the Year - Primary (He Pī Ka Rere) ====
Year	Winner	Song	Ref
2024	Steph Brown and Fen Ikner (Little Lips)	"Because"	
2025	Michal Bush (Music with Michal)	"Shapes and Colours"	

=== APRA Best Jazz Composition ===
Established in 2016, the APRA Best Jazz Composition award recognises outstanding composition in jazz. The award is presented annually at the Wellington Jazz Festival.

Year	Winner	Song	Ref
2016	Callum Allardice	"Sons of Thunder"	
2017	Callum Allardice	"Deep Thought"	
2018	Anita Schwabe	"Springtide"	
2019	Callum Allardice	"Chungin'"	
2020	Jake Baxendale	"Tui"	
2021	Lucien Johnson	"Blue Rain"	
2022	Lauren Ellis	"Papatūānuku"	
2023	Louisa Williamson	"Dream Within A Dream"	
2024	Lucien Johnson	"Satellites"	
2025	Cory Champion (Clear Path Ensemble)	"Cascade d’Ars"	

== APRA Professional Development Awards ==
The APRA Professional Development Awards were established in 2005 and are awarded biennially. Initially awarded to one recipient, from 2009 to 2019 three awards were given each round, recognising excellence in the fields of classical, pop contemporary, and film, television and video. Each recipient was awarded $12,000 cash to advance their careers through study or travel. Due to post-COVID circumstances, adjustments were made to the way the Professional Development Awards are distributed. Instead of $30,000 being split between three disciplines, six winners are chosen with each recipient receiving $5,000.

Year	Professional Development Award			Ref
2005	Robin Toan			
2007	John Chong Nee			
	Film, TV & Video	Pop Contemporary	Classical	
2009	Grayson Gilmour	Jessica Hansell	Samuel Holloway	
2011	Stephen Gallagher	Miriam Clancy	Simon Eastwood	
2013	Karl Steven	Nick Gaffaney	Alex Taylor	
2015	Hamish Oliver	Mara TK	Sarah Ballard	
2017	Claire Cowan	Chelsea Jade	Clovis McEvoy	
2019	Maxwell Stone	Delaney Davidson; Jamie McDell; Brooke Singer	Reuben Jelleyman	
	Professional Development Award			
2021	Emi Pogoni, Jolyon Mulholland, Lisa Crawley, Maree Sheehan, Phodiso Dintwe, Valentine Nixon			
2022	Gabriel Everett, Jessie Leov, Joel Tashkoff, Katie Sharp, Tali Jenkinson, William Philipson			
2023	Byllie-jean, Damian Golfinopoulos, Fergus Fry, Flo Wilson, Vicki Ormond			
2024	Diaz Grimm, Gussie Larkin, Paloma Schneideman, Garling Wu, James Mac			
2025	David Feauai-Afaese , Hannah Lubamba , Seth Haapu, Jesse Austin-Stewart, Karoline Park-Tamati			

== APRA Top 100 New Zealand Songs of All Time ==
In 2001, the APRA Top 100 New Zealand Songs of All Time was compiled by members of APRA to commemorate the organisation's 75th anniversary. The top 30 entries were used to create the Nature's Best compilation CD, with the rest of the list appearing in follow-up compilations. A similar list was made in Australia of the top 30 Australian songs.

== See also ==
- Mozart Fellowship
