= APRA Silver Scroll Awards for Most Performed New Zealand Works =

- Awarded for: Awards for the most performed New Zealand song in New Zealand and overseas
- Country: New Zealand
- Presented by: APRA New Zealand
- Reward: APRA Silver Scroll
- First award: 1994
- Final award: 2015

Highlights
- Most awards: Brooke Fraser (NZ); Neil Finn (overseas)
- Website: APRA NZ

The APRA Silver Scroll Awards for Most Performed New Zealand Work in New Zealand and Most Performed New Zealand Work Internationally were two annual awards presented to the New Zealand song that had been performed the most in New Zealand and internationally, respectively. The awards were presented by APRA AMCOS New Zealand, the copyright collective representing New Zealand composers, lyricists and music publishers. The awards were presented annually at the APRA Silver Scroll Awards. The award was last presented in 2015.

While the national award was highly contested, from 2000 to 2012 the international award was dominated by Crowded House's 1986 song "Don't Dream It's Over".

== Most Performed New Zealand Work in New Zealand ==
The Most Performed New Zealand Work in New Zealand winner is determined by APRA NZ, using data provided by New Zealand television and radio. The award covers the period of 1 July to 30 June each year. At least 50% of the song must have been written by an APRA New Zealand member.

Year	Songwriter(s)	Performer	Song
1994	Neil Finn & Tim Finn	Crowded House	"Weather With You"
1995	Dave Dobbyn	Dave Dobbyn	"Language"
1996	Paul Fuemana & Alan Jansson	OMC	"How Bizarre"
1997	Bic Runga	Bic Runga	"Sway"
1998	James Reid	The Feelers	"Supersystem"
1999	James Reid	The Feelers	"Venus"
2000	Boh Runga	Stellar	"Violent"
2001	Julia Deans	Fur Patrol	"Lydia"
2002	Anika Moa	Anika Moa	"Youthful"
2003	Geoffrey Maddock, Kirsten Morrelle, Joel Wilton, Ben King & Andrew Clark	Goldenhorse	"Maybe Tomorrow"
2004	Brooke Fraser	Brooke Fraser	"Better"
2005	Neil Finn & Tim Finn	Finn Brothers	"Won't Give In"
2006	James Reid	The Feelers	"Stand Up"
2007	Brooke Fraser	Brooke Fraser	"Deciphering Me"
2008	Jason Kerrison, Bobby Kennedy, Matt Treacy & Clinton Harris	Opshop	"One Day"
2009	Jeremy Redmore, Simon Oscroft, Matthew Warman, Aidan Bartlett & Nick Campbell	Midnight Youth	"The Letter"
2010	Dane Rumble, Te Awanui Reeder & Samuel King	Dane Rumble	"Cruel"
2011	Brooke Fraser & Scott Ligertwood	Brooke Fraser	"Something in the Water”
2012	Dave Baxter	Avalanche City	"Love Love Love"
2013	Brooke Fraser & Scott Ligertwood	Brooke Fraser	"Something in the Water”
2014	Ella Yelich-O'Connor and Joel Little	Lorde	"Team"
2015	Matiu Walters, Marlon Gerbes and Priese Board	Six60	"Special"

== Most Performed New Zealand Work Overseas ==
The winners of Most Performed New Zealand Work Overseas are decided by APRA NZ, based on international performance activity.

Year	Songwriter(s)	Performer	Song
1994	Neil Finn & Tim Finn	Crowded House	"Weather with You"
1995	Neil Finn	Crowded House	"Don't Dream It's Over"
1996	Paul Fuemana & Alan Jansson	OMC	"How Bizarre"
1997	Paul Fuemana & Alan Jansson	OMC	"How Bizarre"
1998	Paul Fuemana & Alan Jansson	OMC	"How Bizarre"
1999	Paul Fuemana & Alan Jansson	OMC	"How Bizarre"
2000	Neil Finn	Crowded House	"Don't Dream It's Over"
2001	Neil Finn	Crowded House	"Don't Dream It's Over"
2002	Not presented (Note: In 2002, the Most Performed Work Overseas was "How Bizarre" by OMC, however APRA chose not to present an award that year as it was felt there would be "little interest" for what was considered an "old record". Grigg, Simon (2015). How Bizarre: Pauly Fuemana and the song that stormed the world (First ed.). New Zealand: Awa Press. p. 120. ISBN 978-1-927249-22-2.)		
2003	Neil Finn	Crowded House	"Don't Dream It's Over"
2004	Neil Finn	Crowded House	"Don't Dream It's Over"
2005	Neil Finn	Crowded House	"Don't Dream It's Over"
2006	Neil Finn	Crowded House	"Don't Dream It's Over"
2007	Neil Finn	Crowded House	"Don't Dream It's Over"
2008	Neil Finn	Crowded House	"Don't Dream It's Over"
2009	Neil Finn	Crowded House	"Don't Dream It's Over"
2010	Neil Finn	Crowded House	"Don't Dream It's Over"
2011	Neil Finn	Crowded House	"Don't Dream It's Over"
2012	Neil Finn	Crowded House	"Don't Dream It's Over"
2013	Brooke Fraser & Scott Ligertwood	Brooke Fraser	"Something in the Water”
2014	Ella Yelich-O'Connor and Joel Little	Lorde	"Royals"
2015	Ella Yelich-O'Connor and Joel Little	Lorde	"Royals"
