= 2017 APRA Silver Scroll Awards =

Annual New Zealand songwriting awards

- Awarded for: Excellence in New Zealand songwriting
- Date: 28 September 2017
- Location: Dunedin Town Hall, Dunedin
- Country: New Zealand
- Presented by: APRA New Zealand
- Website: apraamcos.co.nz/awards/awards/silver-scroll-awards/

The 2017 APRA Silver Scroll Awards were held on Thursday 28 September 2017 at the Dunedin Town Hall in Dunedin, celebrating excellence in New Zealand songwriting. This was the first time the awards had been hosted in Dunedin.

Dunedin-born musician and long-listed songwriter Shayne Carter was the musical director for the event. His duties included arranging the five shortlisted songs to be covered by different musicians in a new style.

== Silver Scroll award ==
The Silver Scroll award celebrates outstanding achievement in songwriting of original New Zealand pop music. The short list of finalists was announced on 24 August.

The 2017 shortlist is notable for all five songs having been performed and written by female artists, though four male cowriters are among the nominees. The nominees include two previous Silver Scroll winners: Bic Runga who won in 1996 for "Drive", and Ella Yelich-O'Connor and co-writer Joel Little who won in 2013 for "Royals".

| Songwriter(s) | Song | Act | Covering artist |
|---|---|---|---|
| Bic Runga and Kody Nielson | "Close Your Eyes" | Bic Runga | Drorgan |
| Ella Yelich O'Connor, Jack Antonoff and Joel Little | "Green Light" | Lorde | Ron Gallipoli |
| Hannah Topp | "Horizon" | Aldous Harding | KVKA and Stuss |
| Chelsea Jade Metcalf and Leroy Clampitt | "Life of the Party" | Chelsea Jade | Tiny Ruins |
| Nadia Reid | "Richard" | Nadia Reid | Death & the Maiden |

=== Long list ===
In July 2017 a top 20 long list was announced. From this list APRA members voted to decide the five songs that make up the year's short list. Singer-songwriter Lorde has two long-listed songs.

- Aldous Harding – "Horizon" (Hannah Topp)
- Alien Weaponry – "Urutaa" (Lewis de Jong, Henry de Jong and Ethan Trembath)
- Bic Runga – "Close Your Eyes" (Bic Runga and Kody Nielson)
- Chelsea Jade – "Life of the Party" (Chelsea Jade Metcalf and Leroy Clampitt)
- Cut Off Your Hands – "Hate Somebody" (Nick Johnston, Philip Hadfield and Brent Harris)
- Fazerdaze – "Lucky Girl" (Amelia Murray and Gareth Thomas)
- French For Rabbits – "One and Only" (Brooke Singer)
- Grayson Gilmour – "Hundred Waters" (Grayson Gilmour and Cory Champion)
- Kings – "Don’t Worry ‘Bout It" (Kingsdon Chapple-Wilson)
- Lawrence Arabia – "O Heathcote" (James Milne)
- Lorde – "Green Light" (Ella Yelich-O’Connor, Jack Antonoff and Joel Little)
- Lorde – "Liability" (Ella Yelich-O’Connor and Jack Antonoff)
- Louis Baker – "Rainbow" (Louis Baker and Bradford Ellis)
- Lydia Cole – "Sober" (Lydia Cole)
- Nadia Reid – "Richard" (Nadia Reid)
- Seth Haapu – "Sunday Best" (Seth Haapu)
- Shayne P Carter – "I Know Not Where I Stand" (Shayne P Carter)
- SWIDT – "Little Did She Know" (Amon McGoram, Daniel Latu and Isaiah Libeau)
- Teeks – "If Only" (Te Karehana Toi)
- Troy Kingi and Mara TK – "Cold Steel" (Troy Kingi and Mara TK)

== New Zealand Music Hall of Fame ==
New Zealand indie rock band The Clean was inducted into the New Zealand Music Hall of Fame at the Silver Scroll awards ceremony in September.

== Other awards ==
Four other awards were presented at the Silver Scroll Awards: APRA Maioha Award (for excellence in contemporary Maori music), SOUNZ Contemporary Award (for creativity and inspiration in composition) and APRA Best Original Music in a Feature Film Award and APRA Best Original Music in a Series Award.

| Award | Nominees |
|---|---|
| APRA Maioha Award | Kingi Kiriona and Jeremy Mayall – "Atua Whiowhio" (Kingi Kiriona and Jeremy Mayall); Lewis de Jong, Henry de Jong, and Ethan Trembath – "Raupatu" (Alien Weaponry); Maisey Rika – "Taku Mana" (Maisey Rika) |
| SOUNZ Contemporary Award | Chris Gendall – "Incident Tableaux Part One"; Jeroen Speak – "Serendipity Fields"; Salina Fisher – "Tōrino – echoes on pūtōrino improvisations by Rob Thorne" |
| APRA Best Original Music in a Feature Film Award | Marc Chesterman – Spookers; Peter Hobbs – Jean; Tim Prebble – One Thousand Ropes |
| APRA Best Original Music in a Series Award | Claire Cowan – Hillary; Karl Steven – 800 Words; Mahuia Bridgman-Cooper – Terry Teo |

== APRA song awards ==
Outside of the Silver Scroll Awards, APRA presented five genre awards. The APRA Best Pacific Song was presented at the Pacific Music Awards, the APRA Best Country Music Song was presented at the New Zealand Country Music Awards, the APRA Best Māori Songwriter was presented at the Waiata Maori Music Awards and the APRA Children’s Song of the Year and What Now Video of the Year were presented on Children's Day. The award for Best Jazz Composition was presented at the Wellington Jazz Festival.

| Award | Songwriter(s) | Act | Song |
|---|---|---|---|
| APRA Children's Song of the Year | Jeremy Dillon & Ben Sinclair | Moe & Friends | "We Like Pets!" |
| APRA Best Country Music Song | Chester Travis | Great Danes | "Toothache" |
| APRA Best Jazz Composition | Callum Allardice | Callum Allardice | "Deep Thought" |
| APRA Best Māori Songwriter | Maisey Rika | Maisey Rika | "Taku Mana" |
| APRA Best Pacific Song | Aaradhna Patel | Aaradhna | "Brown Girl" |
