= 2008 APRA Silver Scroll Awards =

Annual New Zealand songwriting awards

- Awarded for: Excellence in New Zealand songwriting
- Date: September 10, 2008
- Location: Auckland Town Hall, Auckland
- Country: New Zealand
- Presented by: APRA New Zealand-Australasian Mechanical Copyright Owners Society
- Website: apra-amcos.co.nz/apra-awards.aspx

The 2008 APRA Silver Scroll Awards were held on Wednesday 10 September 2008 at the Auckland Town Hall, celebrating excellence in New Zealand songwriting. The Silver Scroll Award was presented to Jason Kerrison, Bobby Kennedy, Matt Treacy and Clinton Harris for the Opshop song "One Day", and the country duo Topp Twins were inducted into the New Zealand Music Hall of Fame. The event also paid tribute to singer-songwriter Mahinārangi Tocker who had died earlier in 2008.

== Silver Scroll Award ==
The Silver Scroll Award celebrates outstanding achievement in songwriting of original New Zealand pop music. The evening's music performances were produced by Don McGlashan. Each of the nominated songs were covered in a new style by another artist.

Songwriters	Act	Song	Covering artist
Anika Moa	Anika Moa	"Dreams In My Head"	Voom
Dave Gibson and Justyn Pilbrow	Elemeno P	"Baby Come On"	King Kapisi
Jason Kerrison, Bobby Kennedy, Matt Treacy and Clinton Harris	Opshop	"One Day"	Sami Sisters
Liam Finn	Liam Finn	"Gather to the Chapel"	Little Bushman
Samuel Scott, Luke Buda, Tom Wedde, William Ricketts, Richard Singleton and Warner Emery	The Phoenix Foundation	"Bright Grey"	Bachelorette

=== Long list ===
A top-20 long list was announced in July 2008:

- Dave Gibson and Justyn Pilbrow "Baby Come On" (Elemeno P)
- Samuel Scott, Luke Buda, Tom Wedde, William Ricketts, Richard Singleton and Warner Emery "Bright Grey" (The Phoenix Foundation)
- John Chong Nee and Delani Tuala "Butterflies" (Delani)
- Anika Moa "Dreams in my Head" (Anika Moa)
- Liam Finn "Gather to the Chapel" (Liam Finn)
- Sam Trenwith "If I Say" (Radiator)
- Kody Nielson "Life Will Get Better Some Day" (The Mint Chicks)
- Jason Kerrison, Bobby Kennedy, Matt Treacy and Clinton Harris ""One Day"" (Opshop)
- Jon Toogood, Tom Larkin, Phil Knight, Karl Kippenberger and Barry Palmer "One Will Hear the Other " (Shihad)
- Lauren Thomson "Our Love Is Due" (Lauren Thomson)
- Brannigan Kaa, Hone Kaa and Jo Paku "Purua" (Brannigan Kaa)
- Geoff Maddock "Saying My Name" (Goldenhorse)
- Wayne Mason "Sense Got Out" (Wayne Mason)
- Steven Mathieson, Tim Van Dammen and James Brennan "Seriously" (Collapsing Cities)
- Ryan McPhun "Tane Mahuta" (The Ruby Suns)
- Nick Buckton "The Phone Song" (Side Kick Nick)
- Gin Wigmore "These Roses" (Gin Wigmore)
- Brent Park and Karoline Tamati "Walk Right Up" (Ladi6)
- Iva Lamkum, Caleb Robinson and Miles Crayford "White Roses" (Iva Lamkum)
- Dave Dobbyn "Wild Kisses Like Rain" (Dave Dobbyn)

== New Zealand Music Hall of Fame ==
Country singers and entertainers Jools Topp and Lynda Topp – collectively known as the Topp Twins – were inducted into the New Zealand Music Hall of Fame. Reb Fountain and Johnny Barker performed a musical tribute to the Topps.

== Other awards ==
Four other awards were presented at the Silver Scroll Awards: APRA Maioha Award (for excellence in contemporary Maori music), SOUNZ Contemporary Award (for creativity and inspiration in classical composition) and two awards acknowledging songs with the most radio and television plays in New Zealand and overseas.

=== APRA Maioha Award ===
Songwriters	Act	Song
Ruia Aperahama	Ruia Aperahama	"Rere Reta Rere Rata"
Carol Storey	Carol Storey	"Kirikiri O Te Wa"
Maitreya	Maitreya	"Waitaha"

=== SOUNZ Contemporary Award ===
Songwriters	Song
Chris Gendall	"Wax Lyrical"
Chris Cree Brown	"Remote Presence"
Peter Scholes	"Requiem Concerto"

=== Most Performed Works ===
Award	Songwriters	Act	Song
Most Performed Work in New Zealand	Jason Kerrison, Bobby Kennedy, Matt Treacy and Clinton Harris	Opshop	"One Day"
Most Performed Work in Overseas	Neil Finn	Crowded House	"Don't Dream It's Over"

== APRA song awards ==
Outside of the Silver Scroll Awards, APRA presented four genre awards in 2008. The APRA Best Pacific Song was presented at the Pacific Music Awards, the APRA Best Country Music Song was presented at the New Zealand Country Music Awards and the inaugural APRA Children's Song of the Year and What Now Video of the Year were presented at StarFest.

Award	Songwriters	Act	Song
APRA Best Pacific Song	Malo Luafutu, Tyra Hammond, Jordan Iusitini and Aaron Iusitini	Scribe	"Say It Again"
APRA Best Country Music Song	Bruce Dennis	Bruce Dennis	"Ain't Gonna Run"
APRA Children's Song of the Year	Craig Smith	Craig Smith	"Wonky Donkey"
APRA Children's Song of the Year	Claudia Gunn	Claudia Gunn	"Lullaby Time"
What Now Video of the Year	—N/a	The Funky Monkeys	"Thank You Song"
