= 2016 APRA Silver Scroll Awards =

New Zealand songwriting award

- Awarded for: Excellence in New Zealand songwriting
- Date: September 29, 2016
- Location: Vector Arena, Auckland
- Country: New Zealand
- Presented by: APRA New Zealand-Australasian Mechanical Copyright Owners Society
- Winner: None (revoked)
- Website: apraamcos.co.nz/awards/awards/silver-scroll-awards/

The 2016 APRA Silver Scroll Awards were held on Thursday 29 September 2016 at Vector Arena in Auckland, celebrating excellence in New Zealand songwriting. Five years later APRA revoked the 2016 Silver Scroll after recipient Thomas Oliver admitted assaulting a woman on the night of the awards.

== Silver Scroll award ==
The Silver Scroll award celebrates outstanding achievement in songwriting of original New Zealand pop music. The short list of finalists was announced on 1 September.

The Silver Scroll was awarded to Thomas Oliver. He is no longer recognised as the winner after APRA revoked the award in 2021. Oliver admitted that at an after-party on the night of a separate award ceremony in 2017, he assaulted a woman by grabbing her around the neck.

The music director for 2016 was musician and 2007 Silver Scroll nominee Sean James Donnelly. As well as overseeing all music performances, he was arranged for the five Silver Scroll finalists to be covered in a unique style by different artists.

Songwriter(s)	Song	Act	Covering artist
Lydia Cole	"Dream"	Lydia Cole	Nadia Reid with Sam Taylor
Samuel Scott, Lukasz Buda, Conrad Wedde, William Ricketts, Thomas Callwood, Christopher O’Connor	"Give Up Your Dreams"	The Phoenix Foundation	Oystercatcher
Thomas Oliver	"If I Move To Mars"	Thomas Oliver	Yoko Zuna
Emily Littler, Billie Rogers, Alex Brown, Christopher Farnham	"Pedestrian Support League"	Street Chant	Courtney Hate
Tami Neilson, Jay Neilson	"The First Man"	Tami Neilson	Jocee Tuck

=== Long list ===
In July 2016 a top 20 long list was announced. From this list APRA members voted to decide the five songs that will make up the year's short list.

- "10 Years" - Seth Haapu
- "A Lake" - Lawrence Arabia
- "All Eyes In The Room" - Gareth Thomas
- "All Over You" - Leisure
- "August Song" - The Sami Sisters
- "Buried By The Burden" - Pacific Heights featuring Louis Baker
- "Don't Rate That" - David Dallas
- "Dream" - Lydia Cole
- "Give Up Your Dreams" - The Phoenix Foundation
- "Harmony House" - Dave Dobbyn
- "If I Move To Mars" - Thomas Oliver
- "Love Will Be A River" - Holly Arrowsmith with Fly My Pretties
- "March" - Electric Wire Hustle featuring Deva Mahal
- "One Question" - Yoko-Zuna featuring Laughton Kora
- "Pedestrian Support League" - Street Chant
- "Pocket" - Miloux
- "Stuck In Melodies" - Andrew Keoghan
- "The First Man" - Tami Neilson
- "The Hours" - Mice On Stilts
- "We Will Rise Again" - Shayne P Carter

== New Zealand Music Hall of Fame ==
Singer-songwriter Moana Maniapoto was inducted into the New Zealand Music Hall of Fame at the Silver Scroll awards ceremony in September.

== Other awards ==
Six other awards were presented at the Silver Scroll Awards: APRA Maioha Award (for excellence in contemporary Maori music), SOUNZ Contemporary Award (for creativity and inspiration in composition), and APRA Best Original Music in a Feature Film Award and APRA Best Original Music in a Series Award. The award for the most performed New Zealand song in New Zealand and overseas was dropped in 2016.

Award	Nominees
APRA Maioha Award	Rob Ruha "Kariri" (Rob Ruha feat. Tiki Taane); Thomas Rawiri, Mokoia Huata - "Mana Whenua" (IHI); Kirsten Te Rito, James Illingworth, Joseph Te Rito – "Tamaiti Ngaro" (Kirsten Te Rito)
SOUNZ Contemporary Award	Kenneth Young - "Piano Trio"; Salina Fisher - "Rainphase"; Chris Cree Brown - "Viola Concerto"
APRA Best Original Music in a Feature Film Award	Samuel Scott, Lukasz Buda, Conrad Wedde - Hunt for the Wilderpeople; Mahuia Bridgeman-Cooper, Tama Waipara - Mahana (The Patriarch); Tom McLeod - The Art of Recovery
APRA Best Original Music in a Series Award	Karl Steven - 800 Words; Age Pryor - Jiwi’s Machines; Tami Neilson, Jay Neilson - The Brokenwood Mysteries

== APRA song awards ==
Outside of the Silver Scroll Awards, APRA presented six genre awards in 2016. The APRA Best Pacific Song was presented at the Pacific Music Awards, the APRA Best Country Music Song was presented at the New Zealand Country Music Awards, the APRA Best Māori Songwriter will be presented at the Waiata Maori Music Awards and the APRA Children's Song of the Year and What Now Video of the Year will be presented live on What Now. For the first time in 2016, the award for Best Jazz Composition was awarded, presented at the National Jazz Festival.

Award	Songwriter(s)	Act	Song
APRA Best Pacific Song	Opetaia Foa’i	Te Vaka	"Papua I Sisifo"
APRA Best Country Music Song	Mel Parsons	Mel Parsons	"Alberta Sun"
APRA Best Jazz Composition	Callum Allardice	Callum Allardice	"Sons of Thunder"
APRA Best Māori Songwriter	Rob Ruha	—N/a	—N/a
APRA Children's Song of the Year	Lucy Hiku & Jenny Payne	Itty Bitty Beats	"Pō Mārie"
What Now Children's Video of the Year	Rainbow Rosalind	Rainbow Rosalind	"Aotearoa, Home of Our Hearts"
