= Michael Norris (composer) =

New Zealand composer and lecturer

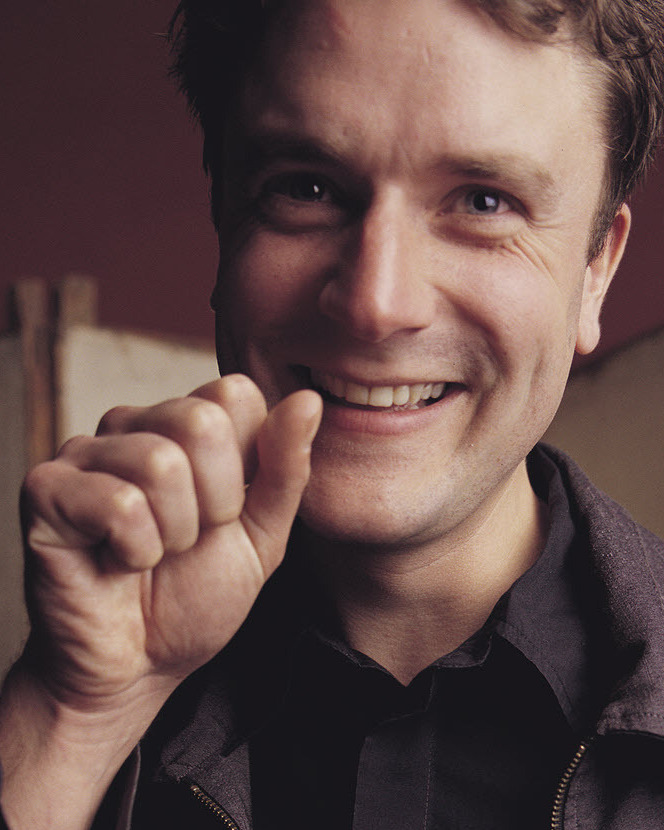
Norris in 2002

Michael Norris (born 1973) is a New Zealand composer, music theorist and Associate Professor at Victoria University of Wellington.

== Early life and education ==
Norris was born in 1973. He attended Logan Park High School and the University of Otago. He gained a BMus (Hons) from Victoria University and an MMus from the City, University of London in 1997.

== Career ==
Norris teaches composition, sonic art and post-tonal music theory at Victoria University. In addition to his compositions Norris is a software developer and music theorist and has authored several papers on harmonic theory.

Norris, with other musicians and conductor Hamish McKeich, established the contemporary music ensemble Stroma in 2000. He was the University of Otago’s Mozart Fellow in composition in 2002. His compositions have been played by New Zealand performers and internationally with his work Sgraffito premiered at the Donaueschingen Festival in Germany in 2010.

Norris's interest in and understanding of taonga pūoro (traditional Māori instruments) dates from the early 1990s when he attended workshops run by Richard Nunns. Rerenga (originally titled Mātauranga (Rerenga)) was commissioned by the New Zealand Symphony Orchestra to mark the 250th anniversary of Captain Cook's landfall in New Zealand and premiered in 2019. The orchestra, taonga pūoro and electronic music are woven together to symbolise the mixing of Māori culture and traditional knowledge with western culture.

In 2026 Norris was composer in residence at AWE (At the World's Edge Festival). His composition SoundCathedral was performed in the St Paul's Cathedral in Wellington as part of the New Zealand Festival of the Arts in 2026. The Sibylline Prophecies by Renaissance composer Orlando di Lasso formed the basis of the work which was then interwoven with the sounds of the taonga pūoro and contemporary music. It was performed by The Tudor Consort choir, instrumental group Stroma, the Rangatuone Ensemble playing taonga pūoro, bellringers and organ. Described as a 'performance installation' the musicians played in different spaces around the cathedral.

== Awards ==
In 2003, Norris won the composition competition The Lilburn Prize, named in memory of composer Douglas Lilburn and the Composers Association of New Zealand Trust Fund award in 2011.

Norris has won the SOUNZ Contemporary Award at the APRA New Zealand music awards four times: in 2014 for Inner Phases, in 2018 for Sygyt, in 2019 for the Violin Concerto Sama and in 2020 for Mātauranga (Rerenga). He donated his prize money in 2020 to Haumanu, a group dedicated to the revival of taonga pūoro and performing. In 2026 he won the Te Manu Taki Tuauki o te Tau Best Classical Artist award at the Aotearoa Music Awards for the album Rerenga. The album is a collection of five of Norris's works: Rerenga, Horizon Fields, Claro, Sygyt and Sama.

== Selected works ==
=== Compositions ===
- Chrysalis (1996) – for flute and tape
- Scintilla (2002) – for large chamber ensemble
- Rays of the sun, shards of the moon (2003) – for symphony orchestra
- 14 islands (2005) – for flute/bass flute, prepared harp and unpitched percussion
- From the lonely margins of the sea (2005) – for piano and small orchestra
- Volti (2006) – for piano and orchestra
- Icons and artifice (2007) – for bass clarinet duo, ensemble and live electronics
- Sgraffito (2010)
- Inner Phases (2014) – for string quartet and Chinese instrument ensemble
- Piccled (2014) – for vocalising piccolo player
- Deep field: III (2016) – for flute and live electronics
- Sygyt (2017) – for orchestra, throat singer and optional live electronics
- Violin Concerto Sama (2018)
- Rerenga (originally titled Mātauranga (Rerenga)) (2019) – for orchestra, taonga pūoro and live electronics
- SoundCathedral (2026) – for choir, instrumental ensemble, taonga pūoro, bellringers and organ

=== Selected publications ===
- Norris, M., & Young, J. (2001). Half-heard sounds in the summer air: electroacoustic music in Wellington and the South Island of New Zealand. Organised Sound, 6(1), 21–28. doi:10.1017/S1355771801001042
- Norris, M. (2003). Only in Wellington. New Zealand Listener, 4 Oct 2003; v.190 n.3308, 62.
- Norris, M. (2004). Working at the rock-face - Chris Watson. Canzona, v.25 n.46, 24–28.
- Norris, M. (2006). Tessellations and enumerations : generalising chromatic theories. Canzona, v.26 n.48, 87–95.
- Norris, Michael, & Adams, Christopher. (2006). Composition & pedagogy : a discussion. Canzona, v.26 n.48, 96–101.
- Norris, M. (2007). Tonal desires. Canzona, v.28 n.49, 58–67.
- Norris, Michael. Guidelines for Organising a Composition Competition. Composers Association of New Zealand
