= APRA Awards =

APRA Awards may refer to one of two awards ceremonies:

- APRA Awards (Australia)
- APRA Awards (New Zealand)
