= Alex Taylor (composer) =

New Zealand composer (born 1988)

Alexander Lawther Taylor (born 1988) is a New Zealand composer, poet and writer.

== Early life and education ==
Taylor was born in 1988 and attended Westlake Boys High School. At the University of Auckland he studied music and English. In 2011 he received an MMus(Composition) with a folio of compositions for viola and orchestra, piano, clarinet and ensembles. He was supervised by Eve de Castro-Robinson and John Elmsly.

== Career ==
Taylor sings and plays several instruments: piano, violin and saxophone. He lists the 20th and 21st century composers and musicians who have influenced him as: Europeans Anton Webern, György Ligeti and Gérard Grisey, Americans Charles Ives, Morton Feldman, Annea Lockwood and Conlon Nancarrow; New Zealanders Anthony Watson, Samuel Holloway and Eve de Castro-Robinson.

Taylor also writes poetry and specialises in setting words to music. He also composes for small ensembles, orchestras and choirs. In New Zealand the NZSO and ensemble 175 East have performed his music.

In 2012 the National Youth Orchestra premiered his work feel commissioned when he was the orchestra's Composer-in-Residence. It features viola and cor anglais solos. The third movement of the work is [inner] which was his winning entry in the NZSO Todd Corporation Young Composers Award in 2011.

Taylor has been commissioned by Westlake Boys High School to write pieces which have been performed by them: two years later (2013) for male voice choir and a summoning (2016) for the concert band.

In 2016 he attended the Darmstadt new-music/avant garde festival where he presented a show The Unauthorised History of New Zealand Music with New Zealand composer Celeste Oram.

Taylor completed a PhD at the University of California San Diego under Lei Liang. As at 2026 he is teaching Theory and Composition at the Wonsook Kim College of Fine Arts, Illinois State University.

== Awards and honours ==
In 2012 Taylor won the SOUNZ Contemporary Award at the APRA New Zealand awards for [inner]. He was the youngest person to receive the award. He won the Composers Association of New Zealand Trust Fund Award in 2013. In 2016 Taylor was the recipient of an Arts Foundation New Generation Awards.

== Selected works ==
=== Poetry ===
- Seven prose poems
- For John Cage
- Sym phony; Industrial popping sounds
- How to listen to a piece of music
- Close [t/d]; Park bench; Outside, a cold day

=== Articles ===
- "Strange loops : circular narratives and ambivalence in Samuel Holloway’s “Impossible Songs.”" Canzona, 2009; v.30 n.51, 32–37
- "A discourse around music." Applause (Wellington, N.Z.), Nov 2016; n.22, 16–17

=== Music ===
- Four landscapes (2008) – for string quartet
- [inner] (2011) – a mini viola concerto
- Study of two pears (2011) – a song cycle for mezzo-soprano and chamber ensemble
- Burlesques mecaniques (2012) – for piano trio
- Feel (2012) – for full orchestra
- two years later (2013) – for male voice choir
- Horn concerto : hydraulic fracture (2015) – for horn and orchestra
- a summoning (2016) – for concert band
- Four little pieces (2017) – for cello and piano
- Night (2018) text by H.D. (Hilda Doolittle), 'Night' from her 1916 collection Sea garden
- Assemblage (2019) – for orchestra with painting machine
- On what grounds (2021) – a suite for violin, cello and theorbo
- Asymptote (2021) – for piano trio
- Obtuse strategies (2023) – for piano
