= Daffodils (film) =

Film

- Film poster
- Directed by: David Stubbs
- Written by: Rochelle Bright
- Produced by: Richard Fletcher
- Starring: Rose McIver; George Mason; Kimbra
- Cinematography: Mathew Knight
- Edited by: Cushla Dillon; Scott Gray
- Music by: Lips (Steph Brown and Fen Ikner)
- Production company: Libertine Pictures
- Distributed by: Transmission Films
- Release date: 21 March 2019
- Running time: 93 minutes
- Country: New Zealand
- Language: English
- Box office: $761,910

Daffodils is a 2019 New Zealand musical drama film directed by David Stubbs. It stars Rose McIver and George Mason.

Based on the award-winning New Zealand stage play, inspired by a true story, the film follows an indie musician who recounts her parents' bittersweet romance, after being told about it by her father on his death bed.

== Plot ==
Leaving her dying father's bedside, singer Maisie (Kimbra) rushes to perform at an indie music gig in town. But as she sings the opening song, it is hard for her to ignore the heartfelt story she has just been told – the story of how her dad met and fell in love with her mother, and how it all devastatingly fell apart.

As the night goes on, the love story of her father, Eric (George Mason), and her mother, Rose (Rose McIver), is shown through Maisie's eyes. From the time they meet in Hamilton in 1966, to their separation in the 1980s, we follow the bittersweet nuances of a couple's life, expressed with contemporary re-imaginings of well-known New Zealand songs of artists such as Crowded House, Bic Runga and Dave Dobbyn.

== Cast ==
- Rose McIver as Rose
- George Mason as Eric
- Jodie Hillock as Maureen
- Kimbra as Maisie
- Mark Mitchinson as Barry
- Tandi Wright as Eileen
- Byron Coll as Stuart
- Osgar Gilbert as Eric's Sibling
- Linus Gilbert as Eric's Sibling
- Enoch Gilbert as Eric's Sibling
- Raffaella Gilbert as Family Friend
- Marie-Therese Gilbert as Family Friend

== Production ==
Daffodils won the annual Vista Film Marketing competition in 2017.

Principal photography began on 21 February 2018. Filming began in February 2018 and took place in Waikato, Wairarapa, and Wellington.

The band Lips (Steph Brown and Fen Ikner), who had arranged and performed the music for the stage play (along with guitarist Abraham Kunin), continued their role as musical directors for the film.

== Release ==
The film was released in New Zealand cinemas on 21 March 2019 and on 3 July for DVD and digital release.
