= 2011 APRA Silver Scroll Awards =

Annual New Zealand songwriting awards

- Awarded for: Excellence in New Zealand songwriting
- Date: 13 September 2011
- Location: Auckland Town Hall, Auckland
- Country: New Zealand
- Presented by: APRA New Zealand-Australasian Mechanical Copyright Owners Society
- Website: apra-amcos.co.nz/apra-awards.aspx

The 2011 APRA Silver Scroll Awards were held on Tuesday 13 September 2011 at the Auckland Town Hall, celebrating excellence in New Zealand songwriting. The Silver Scroll Award was presented to Dave Baxter of Avalanche City for the song "Love Love Love", and pop-rock band Hello Sailor were inducted into the New Zealand Music Hall of Fame.

== Silver Scroll Award ==
The Silver Scroll Award celebrates outstanding achievement in songwriting of original New Zealand pop music. The evening's music performances were produced by Karl Steven of Supergroove. Each of the nominated songs were covered in a new style by another artist.

Songwriter(s)	Act	Song	Covering artist
Annabel Alpers	Bachelorette	"Blanket"	Orchestra of Spheres
Dave Baxter	Avalanche City	"Love Love Love"	Benka Boradovsky Bordello Band
Delaney Davidson	Delaney Davidson	"Little Heart"	Cut Off Your Hands
Jon Toogood and Karoline Tamati	The Adults	"Nothing to Lose"	Scratch 22
Ruban Nielson	Unknown Mortal Orchestra	"FFunny FFrends"	Home Brew

=== Long list ===
In July 2011 the top 20 nominees were announced.

Songwriter(s)	Act	Song
Ben King	Grand Rapids	"Singing Showers Golden Lights"
Annabel Alpers	Bachelorette	"Blanket"
Andrew Keoghan	Andrew Keoghan	"Bright Idea"
Annah MacDonald	Annah Mac	"Celia"
Liam Finn	Liam Finn	"Cold Feet"
Kody Nielson	Kody and Bic	"Darkness All Around Us"
Stephen Heard, Dave Rowlands, Strachan Rivers and Tristan Colenso	Clap Clap Riot	"Everyone's Asleep"
Jolyon Mulholland	Mulholland	"Everything's Gonna Be Alright"
Ruban Nielson	Unknown Mortal Orchestra	"FFunny FFriends"
Gareth Thomas	Gareth Thomas	"Google Song"
Jesse Sheehan	Jesse Sheehan	"Grandma's Cookies"
Andrew Wilson, Michael Prain and Lachlan Anderson	Die Die Die	"How Ye"
Logan Bell and Jordan Bell	Katchafire	"Lead Us"
Lisa Crawley	Lisa Crawley	"Leaving"
Delaney Davidson	Delaney Davidson	"Little Heart"
Anna Coddington and Ned Ngatae	Anna Coddington	"Little Islands"
Julia Deans	Julia Deans	"Little Survivor"
David Baxter	Avalanche City	"Love Love Love"
Jon Toogood and Karoline Tamati	The Adults	"Nothing to Lose"
Richard Setford	Bannerman	"She Was A Mountainside"

== New Zealand Music Hall of Fame ==
Pop-rock band Hello Sailor were inducted into the New Zealand Music Hall of Fame. The inducted band members were Graham Brazier, Dave McArtney, Harry Lyon, Rick Ball, Stuart Pearce and Paul Woolright. Steve Abel and Gin Wigmore performed Hello Sailor's song "Blue Lady".

== Other awards ==
Four other awards were presented at the Silver Scroll Awards: APRA Maioha Award (for excellence in contemporary Maori music), SOUNZ Contemporary Award (for creativity and inspiration in composition) and two awards acknowledging songs with the most radio and television play in New Zealand and overseas.

Award	Songwriter(s)	Act	Song
APRA Maioha Award	Tyna Keelan; Ngahiwi Apanui; Tiki Taane	Tyna Keelan; Ngahiwi Apanui; Tiki Taane	"Ko Koe" "E te Kōkā" "Starship Lullaby"
SOUNZ Contemporary Award	Lyell Cresswell; Chris Gendall; Samuel Holloway	—N/a	"Concerto for Piano and Orchestra" "Gravitas" "Sillage"
Most Performed Work in New Zealand	Brooke Fraser & Scott Ligertwood	Brooke Fraser	“Something in the Water”
Most Performed Work in Overseas	Neil Finn	Crowded House	"Don't Dream It's Over"

== APRA song awards ==
Outside of the Silver Scroll Awards, APRA presented four genre awards in 2011. The APRA Best Pacific Song was presented at the Pacific Music Awards, the APRA Best Country Music Song was presented at the New Zealand Country Music Awards and the APRA Children’s Song of the Year and What Now Video of the Year were presented at StarFest.

Award	Songwriter(s)	Act	Song
APRA Best Pacific Song	Donald McNulty, Te Awanui Reeder, David Atai, Junior Rikiau, Feleti Strickson-Pua & Heath Manukau	Nesian Mystik	"Sun Goes Down"
APRA Best Country Music Song	Donna Dean	Donna Dean	"What Am I Gonna Do?"
APRA Children’s Song of the Year	Rob Wigley	Mr Roberelli	"Beans About Beans"
What Now Video of the Year	—N/a	Craig Smith	"Wonky Donkey"
