= Lips (band) =

New Zealand music group

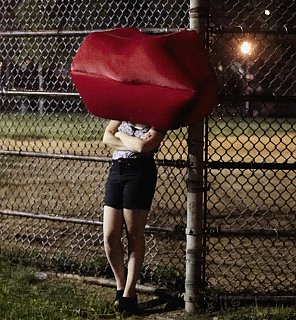
- Steph Brown as Lips

Background information
- Origin: Auckland, New Zealand; New York City, USA
- Genre: Indie pop
- Years active: 2010–current
- Members: Steph Brown; Fen Ikner; Ruby Walsh; Maude Morris
- Website: www.lips.band

Lips is a New Zealand-based music group founded in 2010 by New Zealander singer and keyboardist Steph Brown in New York City. American multi-instrumentalist/producer Fen Ikner joined in 2012, with Ruby Walsh and Maude Morris rounding out the current lineup. Lips is visually represented by the character of "Lips," a girl with giant lips for a head, who appears in their cover art and music videos. The band has released three EPs, one LP, several singles, and produced the 2016 soundtrack of the stage play Daffodils, which they performed in and served as music directors, as well as the OST for the 2019 film version of Daffodils. The band's song "Everything to Me" won them the 2012 Silver Scroll Award.

== History ==
Lips began as a music project of New Zealander musician Steph Brown in 2010. Brown, who had previously played keyboards for other New Zealand-based artists such as Opensouls and Anika Moa, was living in New York City at the time and playing in an R&B duo called Fredericks Brown, along with singer Deva Mahal. She began Lips as a side project, playing around New York City both solo and with various Lips lineups.

In 2012, Brown met West Virginia-born musician Fen Ikner, who had previously played with bands such as Calexico, Seashell Radio, Saint Maybe, and The Shondes. Ikner became the permanent live drummer, contributing production and other instruments to the group's recorded output.

=== "Everything to Me" ===
In 2012, the band released the song "Everything to Me" as part of their EP Look Listen. The song spawned several remixes by acts including Adventure Club, SATL, and Christian Strobe. The song won the band the APRA Silver Scroll songwriting award in 2012.

=== Daffodils ===
In 2014, Lips arranged and performed the music for the musical stage play Daffodils, which was produced by the New Zealand-based theatre production company Bullet Heart Club and written by Rochelle Bright. Brown starred in the play as a fictionalised version of Bright, telling the story of her parents along with her band (composed of Ikner and guitarist Abe Kunin). The story weaves together underscore, dialogue, and re-imagined versions of classic New Zealand pop anthems.

The band went to New Zealand for the initial two-week run of the play at Auckland's Q Theatre. The band then went on tour with the play for two years, performing the show in New Zealand, Australia, and eventually taking the production to the Edinburgh Fringe Festival in 2016. The Daffodils soundtrack EP was released in February 2016.

The stage play was adapted into a feature film, also called Daffodils, for which the band served as the musical directors. Lips wrote three new songs for the film, and provided the soundtrack for the film. The film stars Rose McIver and George Mason, and singer Kimbra taking on the role that Brown originated in the stage production, with Brown and Ikner playing her band. The film was released on 21 March 2019. Brown and Ikner were nominated for an APRA Screen Award for Best Original Music in a Feature Film.

=== I Don't Know Why I Do Anything ===
In 2019, both Ruby Walsh and Maude Morris joined the band, and the single "Guilty Talk" was released. This was mixed by UMO's Kody Nielson, and went to number 1 on New Zealand's Studio Radio Network.

In 2020, Lips finished their debut album I don't know why I do anything, released July 16, 2021, which was a finalist for the Taite Award for Best Album. They released music videos for singles "Your Deodorant Doesn't Work," "Heave Ho," "Empty Hours," and "What the Hell." They toured across New Zealand and performed a live set for the LA "School Night" as part of their ongoing series "School Night at Home".

In 2022, Lips released a video for "Not Today" as part of the "eight-and-a-half-months anniversary" of the release of I don't know why I do anything.

On Saturday 11 March 2023, Lips performed as part of the opening set for My Chemical Romance at Western Springs, Auckland, as part of MCR's comeback tour.

== Discography ==
=== Releases ===
- Lipssongs EP (2010)
- Look/Listen EP (2012)
- Ghosts and Demons EP (2013)
- Daffodils soundtrack (2016)
- Daffodils OST (2019)
- I Don't Know Why I Do Anything (2021)

=== Singles ===
- "Everything to Me" (2012)
- "Traces of Teddy" (2015)
- "This is Me" w/ Zeds Dead (2016)
- "Silent Treatment" w/ Kimbra (2019)
- "Guilty Talk" (2019)
- "Never Have I" (2023)
- "The Wolf" w/ E from Eels (2024)
