= Reuben Jelleyman =

New Zealand composer (born 1993)

Reuben Jelleyman (born 1993) is a New Zealand composer.

== Biography ==
Jelleyman was born in 1993. He attended Avondale College in Auckland. In 2011 he won the Ken Mitchell Trophy for Best Original Composition at the National Youth Jazz Competition held at the Tauranga Jazz Festival. At Victoria University of Wellington from 2012 and 2016 he studied physics and composition and performance at the New Zealand School of Music. In 2021 he completed a master's degree in composition at the Paris Conservatoire.

In 2015 Jelleyman was the youngest finalist in the APRA SOUNZ Contemporary Award (Te Tohu Auaha) with his piece Expanse for mezzo-soprano and chamber ensemble. In 2017 as composer-in-residence with the National Youth Orchestra he wrote Vespro which was premiered by the orchestra. His instrumental piece Designs was premiered by the new music ensemble Stroma in 2018 and recorded by them the following year.

In 2021 he was once again a finalist in the APRA SOUNZ Contemporary Award with the piece Klein Fountain which was written with the Ensemble intercontemporain while he was at the Paris Conservatoire.

In addition to composing Jelleyman was artistic director of Portal Fest, a new contemporary music festival held in Wellington in 2019. He also does audio-visual work.

== Awards ==
In 2016 Jelleyman won the Philip Neill Memorial Prize followed by a Composers Association New Zealand Trust Fund award in 2019. In 2021 he received an Arts Foundation Springboard Award which was given to stimulate career development and consisted of a financial payment and mentoring from Ross Harris. In 2022 he won the SOUNZ Contemporary Award at the APRA awards with Catalogue written for chamber orchestra Multilatérale while he was in Paris.

== Selected works ==
- Solar Wind (2014) – for orchestra
- Expanse (2014) – for mezzo-soprano and chamber ensemble
- Vespro (2018) – for orchestra
- Designs (2018) – for ensemble
- Klein Fountain (2021) – for flute, percussion, cello and piano
- Catalogue (2022) – for chamber ensemble
