= Leao (band) =

New Zealand music group

LEAO
- Origin: Auckland, New Zealand
- Genres: Neo-psychedelic; niu wave
- Years active: 2019–present
- Label: Noa Records
- Members: David Feauai-Afaese (vocals/guitar); Navākatoa Tekela-Pule (bass); Levi Gemmell (steel guitar); Larsen Tito-Taylor (drums/percussion)

Leao (stylised as LEAO) are a Pasifika neo-psychedelia band from Auckland, New Zealand. The band is led by David Feauai-Afaese with additional members Navakatoa Tekela-Pule, Levi Gemmell, and Larsen Tito-Taylor.

The band was formed in 2019 whilst Feauai-Afaese was at university, after Tito-Taylor asked him if he would "ever be keen on doing an alternative Samoan project". Their first EP, Ghost Roads, was released a few months later.

In October 2026, the band won the Silver Scroll songwriting award for their single "LALELEI", the first Samoan language song to have won the award. "LALELEI", Samoan for 'beautiful', is the final single for the upcoming debut album The Samoan Tapes.

The band run their own label Noa Records, which they use to sign and support emerging Pasifika artists. Noa Records's current roster includes Leao, Hun Lynch, Sanguine, and WAIWHAI.

== Discography ==
- Ghost Roads (EP) (2019)
- The Samoan Tapes (upcoming)

== Awards and nominations ==
Year	Award	Work(s) nominated	Category	Result	Ref.
2026	APRA Silver Scroll Awards	"LALELEI"	Silver Scroll	Won	
