= Reb Fountain =

New Zealand folk singer (born 1973)

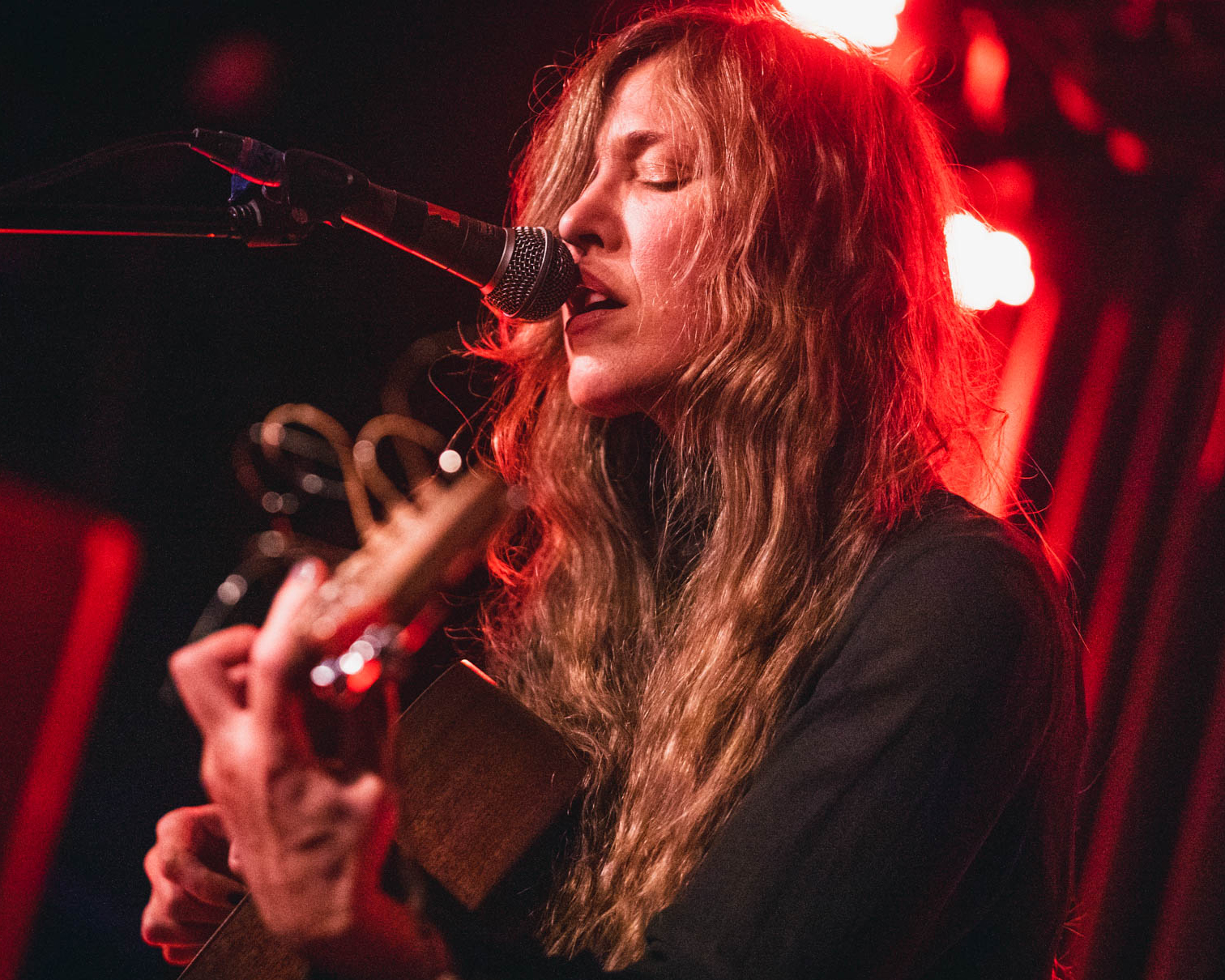
- Fountain at the Great Escape in May 2023

Background information
- Born: Rebecca Fountain; June 1973 (age 53); San Francisco, USA
- Genres: Folk; rock; pop; country
- Years active: 1990; 2006–2009; 2017–present
- Labels: Independent, Flying Nun Records
- Formerly of: The Eastern
- Website: rebfountain.co.nz

Reb Fountain (born June 1973) is an American-born New Zealand singer and songwriter known for her blend of alternative folk, country and pop-rock music.

She first rose to prominence as a teenager, when she was labelled the "best voice to come out of Christchurch" in 1990. She subsequently disappeared from the music scene until the release of her 2006 debut album Like Water, and its 2008 follow up Holster. She stepped away from her solo career for close to a decade, before returning with her 2017 award-winning EP Hopeful & Hopeless.

A major breakthrough came in 2020 after signing with Flying Nun Records and releasing the self-titled Reb Fountain; the album went on to win the 2021 Taite Music Prize, as well as nominations for the Silver Scroll and five Aotearoa Music Awards.

She released her fifth studio album Iris in 2021, followed by How Love Bends in March 2025 and Water for Gasoline in August 2026.

== Early life and education ==
Reb Fountain was born June 1973 in San Francisco, USA. Her parents were hippies who raised her in a music-centred, liberal Christian community. At 6 years old, she moved to New Zealand in 1979, sailing into Lyttelton Harbour aboard the Oriana after her father, John Fountain, took up a role as a professor of economics at the University of Canterbury in Christchurch.

Fountain comes from a long line of migrants; her grandmother had immigrated from Ukraine to Canada, before walking across the border into the United States. Music was an important part of her childhood, and her family used music to connect with other families. She began singing with her parents from a young age and received her first guitar at 5 years old.

After her parents' divorce when she was 9, her relationship with her mother became fraught as her new step-father was an alcoholic and physically abusive. She changed schools numerous times and struggled with depression and an eating disorder. From 13, she started performing live at cafes and open mic nights, inspired by her childhood attending the Whitecliff's Family Music Festival on country singer John Grenell's farm; she found solace in pairing her "melancholic poetry" with music, calling the ability to express herself through songwriting "a lifeline". At 15, while a student at a co-ed boarding school in Colorado, she was briefly committed to a suicide prevention institution for disclosing historic self-harm attempts to her teachers. Following her discharge, she returned to New Zealand to finish her schooling at Hagley College.

== Career ==
=== 1990–2006: Immaculate Sun and further education ===
At 16, she joined her first band Immaculate Sun, and played regularly around Christchurch and Dunedin. As a finalist in 1990's Battle of the Bands contest she was labelled "the best voice to come out of Christchurch in ten years".

Describing herself as "deeply shy", the 16 year old Fountain began relying on liquor to quell her performance anxiety. At 17, after she began drinking more heavily and mixing alcohol with prescription medication, she was admitted into an alcohol rehab clinic at Queen Mary Hospital in Hanmer Springs. She was asked to leave before completing treatment as she refused to leave an "inappropriate" relationship, and although the twelve-step program didn't resonate with her, she stopped drinking and credited the experience for helping shift her perspective on life.

After leaving the clinic, she travelled with her boyfriend to London briefly, before settling and getting married in California. Soon after, she was hospitalised from two grand mal seizures, leaving her unemployed without a driver's licence. Unable to work, she decided to return to a career in music, and moved to Seattle, Washington, to study jazz singing at the Cornish College of the Arts. Moving to Seattle proved pivotal for her, describing it as the first time she took herself seriously as a musician, and that the opportunities to perform with other musicians helped build her confidence.

At 23, after her marriage ended, she moved back to New Zealand.

=== 2006–2009: Like Water and Holster ===
After returning to New Zealand, she began working on her first album with her brother Joel, a prominent jazz drummer. Work towards the album was slow; she had also entered into a new relationship, had two children, and studied a BA and Master's degree at the University of Canterbury. She recorded a "shiteload of songs", with the ones finished first making it onto the album.

Like Water was released in 2006 on her own label, Fountain Records. Critics noted the album's versatility, with some tracks drawing comparisons to Bic Runga, while others were described as ranging from "alt-country to edgy skater-rock". Although it was well received critically, it didn't find commercial success. Following its release, she moved up to Auckland, where she described she initially felt like an outsider as her record "wasn't commercial enough".

In Auckland, she met "kindred collaborators" Dylan Storey and Sam Prebble. The pair joined her for her live shows, performing together as "Reb Fountain and The Bandits". Storey and Prebble were both accomplished musicians in their own right, and the three of them would often collaborate on each other's projects and live performances.

They continued working with her to write and record material for her second album, Holster, released in 2008 through her label.

Following Holster's release, Reb Fountain and The Bandits toured extensively, including joining Don McGlashan for his 2009 nationwide tour.

=== 2010–2013: The Eastern and collaborations ===
Fountain continued to work on new material with Storey and Prebble, including recording songs that would eventually become Little Arrows. During the recordings, she began feeling "really despondent" and lost her motivation for the album. Having left an abusive relationship, she was also struggling financially; as a single mother, her kids had reached an age that made touring difficult. Despite nearly finishing the album, she stepped away from her solo work due to a lack of confidence.

In 2012, Adam McGrath and Jess Shanks invited her to join their Christchurch folk-rock band The Eastern as a background vocalist. She would also go on to perform background vocals for British-New Zealand singer Finn Andrews, and collaborate with a diverse line-up of musicians, including Tami Neilson, Don McGlashan, Marlon Williams, Steve Abel, and Neil Finn.

=== 2014–2017: Hopeful & Hopeless and Little Arrows ===
In 2014, she was convinced to record a live EP, Hopeful & Hopeless, by her friend who was the owner of Auckland's Wine Cellar; it was her last collaboration with Prebble, before his suicide a month later on 23 October 2014. Fountain, who had known and collaborated with Prebble for over a decade, was left devastated by his death. For a long time afterwards, both Fountain and Storey found themselves unable to revisit the unfinished works. She credits persistently performing on tour with The Eastern for helping her to re-engage with her own music again as her confidence rebuilt.

Fountain released the previously-recorded Hopeful & Hopeless in June 2017, followed by the album, Little Arrows, a few months later in September. She describes the works as "two sides of the same coin", thematically dealing with her journey as a migrant and musician.

Both releases were well received critically, and Hopeful & Hopeless went on to win two awards at the New Zealand Country Music Awards, and won Fountain the Best Country Artist award at the 2018 New Zealand Music Awards.

=== 2020: Reb Fountain and Save Our Venues campaign ===
In May 2020, Fountain had a major breakthrough with the release of her self-titled album, Reb Fountain, marking a significant "stylistic shift" to pop, away from her earlier folk and country sound. In a move described by critics as her "Second Coming", it was her first release with Flying Nun Records under a new record deal. The album's planned tour was postponed until the end of 2020 due to COVID-19; in October, she toured as the opening act for Crowded House's 13-date To The Island tour.

The album received critical acclaim, and went on to win the 2021 Taite Music Prize, was short-listed for a Silver Scroll for "Don't You Know Who I Am", and was nominated for five Aotearoa Music Awards, including Album of the Year, Best Alternative Artist, and Best Solo Artist, and technical awards for Best Album Artwork and Best Engineer.

==== Save Our Venues campaign ====
In 2020, after speaking with friends who owned the Wine Cellar and Whammy Bar in Auckland, Fountain became concerned many live music venues would not financially survive COVID-19 lockdowns. Fountain began the Save Our Venues campaign, which grew with support from other New Zealand artists including The Beths, Marlon Williams, and Tiny Ruins. The campaign raised $50,000 within its first 24 hours, and eventually raised over $500,000 in support of 30 independent venues across the country. Many venues, including Hamilton's Nivaro Lounge and Napier's Cabana, credit their survival to the campaign.

=== 2021–2024: Iris and Escaping Utopia ===
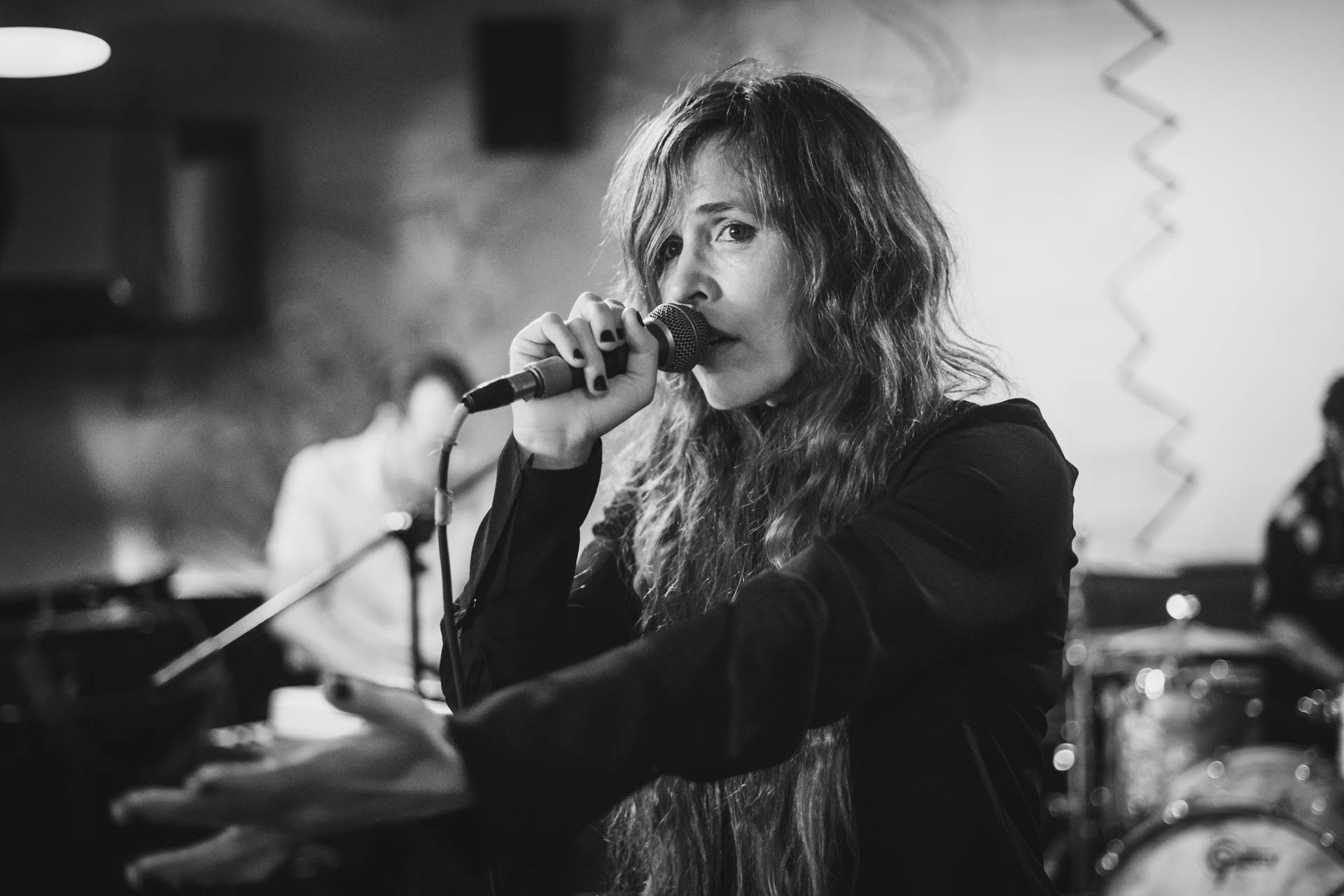
Fountain performing at The Great Escape Festival, 11 May 2023

During the 2020 lockdown, Fountain and her band decided to isolate together at a studio in Waitaki Valley, Otago, to begin recording her next album. During the lockdown, Fountain's co-producer Dave Khan challenged her to write a new song every day. Once lockdown was lifted, Reb and band went to Sublime Studios in Kurow to record a new album.

Fountain released her Flying Nun sophomore album, Iris, in October 2021. Her planned tour was postponed due to Auckland's third COVID-19 lockdown.

Mojo gave the album four out of five stars, calling Fountain "New Zealand's next alt-folk sensation", and in 2025 Rolling Stone featured it in their list of "Top 80 Best NZ Albums of the 2020s", praising her as "one of New Zealand's most consistent lyricists".

In 2024, Fountain partnered with composer Andrew Keoghan to create the score of TVNZ's Escaping Utopia, a three-part miniseries on Gloriavale. The soundtrack featured a mix of new compositions written for the show along with music Fountain had previously released. Fountain and Keoghan went on to win the Best Original Score for the soundtrack at the 2024 New Zealand Screen Awards.

=== 2025: How Love Bends ===
In March 2025, Fountain released her sixth studio album, How Love Bends to critical acclaim, debuting at number 1 on the New Zealand Music Charts, and hitting number 11 on the Top 20 NZ albums sales of 2025.

Fountain released the album's lead single, "Come Down", in September 2024. Described as an "ode to female friendship", its music video was filmed by Fountain, and starred her daughter with her best friend. "Come Down" was her highest charting single, and was nominated for Single of the Year at the 2025 Aotearoa Music Awards.

The album is nominated for the 2026 Taite Music Prize and for Album of the Year at the 2026 Aotearoa Music Awards.

=== 2026: Smoke Signals and Water for Gasoline ===
Fountain released her EP Smoke Signals on 1 May 2026 for New Zealand Music Month. Recorded in collaboration with producers Dave Khan and Matt Mitchinson, the record "reflects on ideas of collective grief and a reimagining of the political world order".

It was followed by Fountain's seventh album, Water for Gasoline, in August.

== Personal life ==
Fountain raised two children as a single mother, and would often bring them with her when busking around Auckland. Her son, Kalvin Fountain-Best, is an artist and photographer who has designed artwork for some of her releases, and her daughter, Lola Fountain-Best, is a writer and director who has filmed numerous music videos for Fountain, including 2021's "Beastie" and "Lacuna", and 2025's "Forever" and "He Commands You to Jump Into The Sea".

== Discography ==
=== Albums and EPs ===
Title	Release	Peak chart position		Details
Title	Release	NZ Top 40	Aotearoa Top 20	Details
Like Water	2006	—	—	Label: Fountain Records; Format: CD
Holster	2008	—	—	Label: Fountain Records; Format: CD
Little Arrows	2017	36	7	Label: Fountain Records; Format: CD, Vinyl
Hopeful & Hopeless (EP)	2017	—	5	Label: Fountain Records; Format: CD, Vinyl
Reb Fountain	2020	3	2	Label: Flying Nun Records; Format: CD, Vinyl
Iris	2021	3	1	Label: Flying Nun Records; Format: CD, Vinyl
Escaping Utopia (soundtrack)	2024	—	—	With Andrew Keoghan
How Love Bends	2025	6	1	Label: Flying Nun Records; Format: CD, vinyl
Smoke Signals (EP)	2026	—	9	Label: Fountain Records
Water for Gasoline	2026	9	1	Label: Fountain Records
"—" denotes a recording that did not chart or was not released in that territory.

=== Selected singles ===
- "Gold" (2017)
- "Faster" (2020)
- "Samson" (2020)
- "When Gods Lie" (2020)
- "Don't You Know Who I Am" (2020)
- "Hawks & Doves (Tali remix)" (2021)
- "Heart" (2021)
- "Beastie" (2021)
- "Lacuna" (2021)
- "Iris" (2021)
- "Invisible Man" (2021)
- "Faithless Lover" (2023)
- "Happy Xmas (War Is Over) (cover)" (2023)
- "How Bizarre (cover)" (2024)
- "Come Down" (2024)
- "Forever" (2024)
- "Nothing Like" (2025)
- "City" (2025)
- "He Commands You To Jump Into The Sea" (2025)
- "Silver Linings" (2025)
- "One Way Trip" (2025)
- "Christmas in Wellington" (cover) (2025)

== Awards and nominations ==
Year	Award	Work(s) nominated	Category	Result	Ref.
2009	APRA Silver Scroll Awards	"January's Well"	APRA Silver Scroll	Longlisted	
2018	New Zealand Music Awards	Little Arrows	Best Folk Artist	Nominated	
2018	New Zealand Music Awards	Hopeful & Hopeless	Best Country Artist	Won	
2018	NZ Country Music Awards	Herself	Best Country Music Artist	Won	
2018	NZ Country Music Awards	"Hopeful and Hopeless"	Best Country Song	Won	
2020	APRA Silver Scroll Awards	"Don't You Know Who I Am"	APRA Silver Scroll	Shortlisted	
2020	Aotearoa Music Awards	Reb Fountain	Album of the Year	Nominated	
2020	Aotearoa Music Awards	Reb Fountain	Best Solo Artist	Nominated	
2020	Aotearoa Music Awards	Reb Fountain	Best Alternative Artist	Nominated	
2021	APRA Silver Scroll Awards	"Hey Mom"	APRA Silver Scroll	Shortlisted	
2021	Taite Music Prize	Reb Fountain	Taite Music Prize	Won	
2022	APRA Silver Scroll Awards	"Iris"	APRA Silver Scroll	Shortlisted	
2022	Aotearoa Music Awards	Iris	Album of the Year	Nominated	
2022	Aotearoa Music Awards	"Lacuna"	Single of the Year	Nominated	
2022	Aotearoa Music Awards	Iris	Best Solo Artist	Nominated	
2022	Rolling Stone NZ Music Awards	Iris	Best Record	Nominated	
2022	Taite Music Prize	Iris	Taite Music Prize	Nominated	
2024	New Zealand Screen Awards	Escaping Utopia	Best Original Score	Won	
2025	Aotearoa Music Awards	"Come Down"	Single of the Year	Nominated	
2026	Aotearoa Music Awards	How Love Bends	Album of the Year	Nominated	
2026	Taite Music Prize	How Love Bends	Taite Music Prize	Nominated	
