= 2012 APRA Silver Scroll Awards =

Annual New Zealand songwriting awards

- Awarded for: Excellence in New Zealand songwriting
- Date: September 13, 2012
- Location: Auckland Town Hall, Auckland
- Country: New Zealand
- Presented by: APRA New Zealand-Australasian Mechanical Copyright Owners Society
- Acts: Beastwars, Julia Deans, The Nudge, The Wyld, L.A. Mitchell, Kora, Dave Dobbyn
- Website: apra-amcos.co.nz/apra-awards.aspx

The 2012 APRA Silver Scroll Awards were held on Thursday 13 September 2012 at the Auckland Town Hall, celebrating excellence in New Zealand songwriting. The Silver Scroll Award was presented to New York-based pop artist Stephanie Brown (Lips), and reggae band Herbs was inducted into the New Zealand Music Hall of Fame.

== Silver Scroll Award ==
The Silver Scroll Award celebrates outstanding achievement in songwriting of original New Zealand pop music. The evening's music performances were produced by Shihad frontman Jon Toogood. Each of the nominated songs were covered in a new style by another artist.

Songwriter(s)	Act	Song	Covering artist
Adam McGrath	The Eastern	“State Houses By The River”	Beastwars
Anna Macdonald	Annah Mac	“Girl In Stilettos”	The Wyld
Kody Nielson	Opossom	“Getaway Tonight”	Julia Deans
Lydia Cole	Lydia Cole	“Hibernate”	L.A. Mitchell
Stephanie Brown	Lips	“Everything To Me”	The Nudge

=== Long list ===
In July 2012 a top 20 long list was announced.

- Annah Mac – "Girl In Stilettos"
- Bic Runga – "Everything is Beautiful and New"
- Cairo Knife Fight – "The Origin of Slaves"
- Five Mile Town – "Fatal Flaw"
- Get Well Soon – "Hold On"
- Grand Rapids – "Never Be Without You"
- Great North – "Lead Me To The Light"
- Home Brew – "Datura"
- Jess Chambers – "Hopeful Dreamer"
- Jesse Sheehan – "By Your Side"
- L.A. Mitchell – "When it's All Too Much"
- Lindon Puffin – "Outta Reach"
- Lips – "Everything To Me"
- Lisa Crawley – "Blind Eyes"
- Lydia Cole – "Hibernate"
- Opossom – "Getaway Tonight"
- Ruby Frost – "Water to Ice"
- Six60 – "Forever"
- The Adults – "Anniversary Day"
- The Eastern – "State Houses by the River"

== New Zealand Music Hall of Fame ==
Reggae band Herbs were inducted into the New Zealand Music Hall of Fame by Che Fu. The inducted band members were Dilworth Karaka, Toni Fonoti, Phil Toms, Spencer Fusimalohi, John Berkley, Fred Faleauto and Charles Tumahai, Maurice Watene, Tama Lundon, Jack Allen, Carl Perkins, Willie Hona, Thom Nepia, Tama Renata, Gordon Joll, Grant Pukeroa and Kristen Hapi. Reggae band Kora covered Herbs' song "Rust In Dust", and Dave Dobbyn performed their collaboration "Slice of Heaven".

== Other awards ==
Four other awards were presented at the Silver Scroll Awards: APRA Maioha Award (for excellence in contemporary Maori music), SOUNZ Contemporary Award (for creativity and inspiration in composition) and two awards acknowledging songs with the most radio and television play in New Zealand and overseas.

Award	Songwriter(s)	Act	Song
APRA Maioha Award	Te Awanui Reeder, David Atai and Scotty Morrison	AWA	"Matahīapo"
SOUNZ Contemporary Award	Composed by Alex Taylor	—N/a	"[inner]"
Most Performed Work in New Zealand	Dave Baxter	Avalanche City	"Love Love Love"
Most Performed Work in Overseas	Neil Finn	Crowded House	"Don't Dream It's Over"

== APRA song awards ==
Outside of the Silver Scroll Awards, APRA presented four genre awards in 2012. The APRA Best Pacific Song was presented at the Pacific Music Awards, the APRA Best Country Music Song was presented at the New Zealand Country Music Awards and the APRA Children's Song of the Year and What Now Video of the Year were presented at StarFest.

Award	Songwriter(s)	Act	Song
APRA Best Pacific Song	Nainz Tupa’i and Viiz Tupa’i	Adeaze	"Paradise"
APRA Best Country Music Song	Delaney Davidson	Delaney Davidson	"You're a Loser"
APRA Children's Song of the Year	Levity Beet	Levity Beet	"Sometimes I Make Mistakes"
What Now Video of the Year	Created by Raquel Sims, Amanda Berryman and Jessica Manins, and written by Jamie Burgess	The Chucklebees	"Amazing"
