= 2009 APRA Silver Scroll Awards =

Annual New Zealand songwriting awards

- Awarded for: Excellence in New Zealand songwriting
- Date: September 17, 2009
- Location: Christchurch Town Hall, Christchurch
- Country: New Zealand
- Presented by: APRA New Zealand-Australasian Mechanical Copyright Owners Society
- Hosted by: Oscar Kightley
- Website: apraamcos.co.nz/awards/awards/silver-scroll-awards/apra-silver-scroll/

The 2009 APRA Silver Scroll Awards were held on Thursday, September 17, 2009, at the Christchurch Town Hall, celebrating excellence in New Zealand songwriting. The Silver Scroll Award was presented to James Milne and Luke Buda for the Lawrence Arabia song "Apple Pie Bed", and musicians and academics Hirini Melbourne and Richard Nunns were inducted into the New Zealand Music Hall of Fame.

== Silver Scroll Award ==
The Silver Scroll Award celebrates outstanding achievement in the songwriting of original New Zealand pop music. The evening's music performances were again produced by Don McGlashan. Each of the nominated songs were covered in a new style by another artist.

Songwriter(s)	Act	Song	Covering artist
James Milne and Luke Buda	Lawrence Arabia	"Apple Pie Bed"	Bic Runga
Jeremy Redmore, Aidan Bartlett, Trevor Warman, Nick Campbell, Simon Oscroft	Midnight Youth	"The Letter"	Lindon Puffin & Transgressions
Jess Chambers	Jess Chambers	"Island"	Mark Vanilau & band
Phil Madsen	Phil Madsen	"Dancing on the Moon"	Bang Bang Eche
Shayne Carter	Dimmer	"Degrees of Existence"	Demarnia Lloyd

=== Long list ===
In July 2009 a top-20 long list was announced.

- James Milne and Luke Buda "Apple Pie Bed" (Lawrence Arabia)
- Oliver Gordon, Nick Major, Michael Carpinter, Stephen Small and Jasper De Roos "Closer To Home" (Autozamm)
- Phil Madsen "Dancing On The Moon" (Phil Madsen)
- Shayne Carter "Degrees Of Existence" (Dimmer)
- Peter Wadams, Sam Hansen and Vince Harder "Everything" (P-Money feat. Vince Harder)
- Dann Hume and Jon Hume "Hey Boys And Girls" (Evermore)
- Dave Dobbyn "Howling At The Moon" (Dave Dobbyn)
- Kody Nielson & Ruban Nielson "I Can't Stop Being Foolish" (The Mint Chicks)
- Jess Chambers "Island" (Jess Chambers)
- Reb Fountain "January's Well" (Reb Fountain)
- Jamie Greenslade "Lotaluv" (Maitreya)
- Dave Gibson & Justyn Pilbrow "Louder Louder" (Elemeno P)
- David Atai, Te Awanui Reeder, Donald McNulty, Heath Manukau, Junior Rikiau, Feleti Strickson-Pua and Che Ness "Mr Mista" (Nesian Mystik)
- Eden Mulholland "Oldest Trick In The Book" (Motocade)
- James Christmas & Barry Palmer "On My Mind" (Luger Boa)
- Julia Deans, Andrew Bain & Simon Braxton "Silences & Distances" (Fur Patrol)
- Jeremy Redmore, Simon Oscroft, Matthew Warman, Aidan Bartlett and Nick Campbell "The Letter" (Midnight Youth)
- Andrew Spraggon & Iva Lamkum "Turn Around" (Sola Rosa)
- Matt Barus "Vampires" (Dukes)
- Ruth Carr, Paul Dodge & Ryan Beehre "Wayho" (Minuit)

== New Zealand Music Hall of Fame ==
Musicians the late Hirini Melbourne and Richard Nunns were inducted into the New Zealand Music Hall of Fame. Both were known for their work with traditional Maori instruments. Melbourne was a composer, singer and respected academic, and Nunns is considered the leading authority on taonga pūoro. Moana and the Tribe performed a song written by Melbourne.

== Other awards ==
Four other awards were presented at the Silver Scroll Awards: APRA Maioha Award (for excellence in contemporary Maori music), SOUNZ Contemporary Award (for creativity and inspiration in classical composition) and two awards acknowledging songs with the most radio and television play in New Zealand and overseas.

=== APRA Maioha Award ===
Songwriter(s)	Act	Song
Rewi Spraggon and Riki Bennett	Te Aratoi	"Tapapakanga"
Jamie Greenslade, Jeremy Froger and Rupert Brown	Maitreya	"Whakakotahi Rangatahi"
Maisey Rika, John Rika and Mahuia Bridgman-Cooper	Maisey Rika	"Repeat Offender"

=== SOUNZ Contemporary Award ===
Songwriter(s)	Song
Ross Harris	"Symphony lll"
Michael Norris	"Volti"
Jack Body	"My Name is Mok Bhon"

=== Most Performed Works ===
Award	Songwriter(s)	Act	Song
Most Performed Work in New Zealand	Jeremy Redmore, Simon Oscroft, Matthew Warman, Aidan Bartlett & Nick Campbell	Midnight Youth	"The Letter"
Most Performed Work in Overseas	Neil Finn	Crowded House	"Don't Dream It's Over"

== APRA song awards ==
Outside of the Silver Scroll Awards, APRA presented four genre awards in 2009. The APRA Best Pacific Song was presented at the Pacific Music Awards, the APRA Best Country Music Song was presented at the New Zealand Country Music Awards and the APRA Children’s Song of the Year and What Now Video of the Year were presented at StarFest.

Award	Songwriter(s)	Act	Song
APRA Best Pacific Song	Donald McNulty, Te Awanui Reeder, David Atai, Junior Rikiau, Feleti Strickson-Pua and Heath Manukau	Nesian Mystik	"Nesian 101"
APRA Best Country Music Song	Jess Chambers	Jess Chambers	"Stringing Me Along"
APRA Children’s Song of the Year	Levity Beet	Levity Beet	"Little Blue"
What Now Video of the Year	—N/a	1-2-3 Tree	"Buttons"
