= 2010 APRA Silver Scroll Awards =

Annual New Zealand songwriting awards

- Awarded for: Excellence in New Zealand songwriting
- Date: September 8, 2010
- Location: Auckland Town Hall, Auckland
- Country: New Zealand
- Presented by: APRA New Zealand-Australasian Mechanical Copyright Owners Society
- Website: apra-amcos.co.nz/apra-awards.aspx

The 2010 APRA Silver Scroll Awards were held on Wednesday 8 September 2010 at the Auckland Town Hall, celebrating excellence in New Zealand songwriting. The Silver Scroll Award was presented to Alisa Xayalith, Thom Powers and Aaron Short of The Naked and Famous for their song “Young Blood”, and classic rock group The Fourmyula were inducted into the New Zealand Music Hall of Fame. The evening also included a tribute to Pauly Fuemana of OMC, who had died in January 2010.

== Silver Scroll Award ==
The Silver Scroll Award celebrates outstanding achievement in songwriting of original New Zealand pop music. The evening's music performances were produced by Karl Steven of Supergroove. Each of the nominated songs were covered in a new style by another artist.

Songwriter(s)	Act	Song	Covering artist
Aaron Short, Alisa Xayalith and Thom Powers	The Naked and Famous	"Young Blood"	Three Houses Down
Anika Moa	Anika Moa	"Running Through the Fire (Storm)"	The Datsuns
Julia Deans	Julia Deans	"A New Dialogue"	The Unfaithful Ways
Matthew Hope, Jonathan Pearce, Reuben Stephens and Alexander Freer	Artisan Guns	"Autumn"	Street Chant
Ruban Nielson and Kody Nielson	The Mint Chicks	"Say Goodbye"	Jared, Flick & Caoimhe

=== Long list ===
In July 2010 a top-20 long list was announced.

- "A New Dialogue" (Julia Deans)
- "All of This" (The Naked and Famous)
- "Young Blood" (The Naked and Famous)
- "Aotearoa" (Minuit)
- "Autumn" (Artisan Guns)
- "Barbie Dolls for Baghdad" (The Jordan Luck Band)
- "Buffalo" (The Phoenix Foundation)
- "Flock of Hearts" (The Phoenix Foundation)
- "Cavalry" (Midnight Youth)
- "Comfortable" (Dimmer)
- "Dark Night of Yourself" (Dimmer)
- "Garden" (Anna Coddington)
- "Ghosts" (Kirsten Morrell)
- "Girl, Make Your Own Mind Up" (Don McGlashan and the Seven Sisters)
- "Marvellous Year" (Don McGlashan and the Seven Sisters)
- "In The Dreamlife U Need a Rubber Soul" (The Clean)
- "Running Through The Fire (Storm)" (Anika Moa)
- "Say Goodbye" (The Mint Chicks)
- "Walk Away" (Opensouls)
- "You Got Me (J. Williams feat. Scribe)

== New Zealand Music Hall of Fame ==
Rock band The Fourmyula was inducted into the New Zealand Music Hall of Fame. The inducted band members were Wayne Mason, Martin Hope, Alistair (Ali) Richardson, Chris Parry and Carl Evensen. Auckland band The Situations performed The Fourmyula's song "Tell Me No Lies".

== Other awards ==
Four other awards were presented at the Silver Scroll Awards: APRA Maioha Award (for excellence in contemporary Maori music), SOUNZ Contemporary Award (for creativity and inspiration in composition) and two awards acknowledging songs with the most radio and television play in New Zealand and overseas.

=== APRA Maioha Award ===
Songwriter(s)	Act	Song
Jamie Greenslade	Maitreya feat. Awa	"Sin City"
Ngatapa Black, Shane Taipari & Julian Wilcox	"He Maimai Aroha"	"Miss Black"
Ahorangi Winitana	Ahorangi Winitana	"Óku Máreikura"

=== SOUNZ Contemporary Award ===
Songwriter(s)	Song
Chris Cree Brown	"Inner Bellow"
Chris Gendall	"Rudiments"
Ross Harris	"Violin Concerto No.1"

=== Most Performed Works ===
Award	Songwriter(s)	Act	Song
Most Performed Work in New Zealand	Dane Rumble, Te Awanui Reeder and Samuel King	Dane Rumble	"Cruel"
Most Performed Work in Overseas	Neil Finn	Crowded House	"Don't Dream It's Over"

== APRA song awards ==
Outside of the Silver Scroll Awards, APRA presented four genre awards in 2010. The APRA Best Pacific Song was presented at the Pacific Music Awards, the APRA Best Country Music Song was presented at the New Zealand Country Music Awards and the APRA Children’s Song of the Year and What Now Video of the Year were presented at StarFest.

Award	Songwriter(s)	Act	Song
APRA Best Pacific Song	Tonga Vaea and Three Houses Down	Tonga Vaea and Three Houses Down	"Kanikapila"
APRA Best Country Music Song	Matt Langley	Matt Langley	"7:13"
APRA Children’s Song of the Year	Claudia Gunn	Claudia Gunn	"Home Sweet Home"
What Now Video of the Year	—N/a	Kath Bee	"Individuality"
