= Claire Cowan =

New Zealand composer

- Education: University of Auckland
- Awards: Arts Foundation Te Tumu Toi Laureate Award

Claire Cowan is a New Zealand musician, composer and orchestrator, working across television, film, ballet and chamber music. In 2024 she was awarded the status of Arts Laureate by the Arts Foundation of New Zealand.

== Education ==
Cowan completed an honours degree in composition at the University of Auckland.

== Career ==
Cowan became the first New Zealand woman composer to score a full-length ballet, when she adapted Hansel and Gretel for the Royal New Zealand Ballet in 2019. She also composed Cinderella for the RNZB and Possum Magic for the Australian Ballet School.

Cowan has orchestrated work for a number of popular musicians, including Benee, Tami Neilson and Dave Dobbyn. She was commissioned by the New Zealand Symphony Orchestra to write a series of eight chamber works to accompany New Zealand storybooks.

== Critical assessments ==
Cowan has been described as "one of New Zealand's most prolific composers".

== Honours and awards ==
In 2024 Cowan was awarded the Joanna Hickman, Waiwetu Trust Award, making her one of the Arts Foundation's Arts Laureates.

Cowan has several Best TV Soundtrack awards, and an APRA Screen Award, awarded for her work a miniseries about Edmund Hillary. She has written music for series One Lane Bridge, and won Best Original Score at the 2020 New Zealand Television Awards for her work on Runaway Millionaires. At the 2021 Aotearoa Music Awards she was named Best Classical Artist. In 2023 Cowan won the grand prize at the Oticons Faculty International Film Music Contest. She was awarded a Performing Arts Network Aotearoa New Zealand (PANNZ) FAME Mid-Career Award in 2024.
