= 2015 APRA Silver Scroll Awards =

Annual New Zealand songwriting awards

- Awarded for: Excellence in New Zealand songwriting
- Date: September 17, 2015
- Location: Vector Arena, Auckland
- Country: New Zealand
- Presented by: APRA New Zealand-Australasian Mechanical Copyright Owners Society
- Website: apraamcos.co.nz/awards/awards/silver-scroll-awards/

Television/radio coverage
- Network: 95 bFM

The 2015 APRA Silver Scroll Awards was held on Thursday 17 September 2015 at Vector Arena in Auckland, celebrating excellence in New Zealand songwriting. The 2015 ceremony marked the 50th presentation of the Silver Scroll award. As well as honouring the best songwriting of 2015, the awards retrospectively awarded the best song of 1981 as previously no award was presented in that year.

== Silver Scroll award ==
The Silver Scroll award celebrates outstanding achievement in songwriting of original New Zealand pop music. The short list of finalists was announced on 20 September.

Songwriter(s)	Act	Song	Covering artist
Anthonie Tonnon	Anthonie Tonnon	"Water Underground"	MC Tali
Ella Yelich-O'Connor/Joel Little	Lorde	"Yellow Flicker Beat"	Mark de Clive-Lowe and Ria Hall
Marlon Williams/Tim Moore	Marlon Williams	"Dark Child"	Fazerdaze
Mel Parsons	Mel Parsons	"Get Out Alive"	Ester Stephens and the Means
Ruban Nielson/Kody Nielson	Unknown Mortal Orchestra	"Multi-Love"	Warren Maxwell, Thomas Oliver and Louis Baker

=== Long list ===
In July 2015 a top 20 long list was announced. From this list APRA members voted to decide the five songs that make up the year's short list.

- Dave Rowlands/Stephen Heard/Andrew Moller (Clap Clap Riot + Buzz Moller) "Back In To Your Life"
- Nadia Reid (Nadia Reid) "Call The Days"
- Ruban Nielson/Jacob Portrait (Unknown Mortal Orchestra) "Can't Keep Checking My Phone"
- Thomas Stoneman/Josh Fountain (Thomston) "Collarbones"
- Anji Sami (She's So Rad) "Cool It"
- Marlon Williams/Tim Moore (Marlon Williams) "Dark Child"
- Joel Little/Jarryd James (Jarryd James) "Do You Remember"
- Mel Parsons (Mel Parsons) "Get Out Alive"
- Toni Randle Keegan (Eyreton Hall) "Just In Case Allelujah"
- Joel Little/Georgia Nott/Caleb Nott (Broods) "L.A.F."
- Sean Donnelly (SJD) "Little Pieces"
- Ruban Nielson/Kody Nielson (Unknown Mortal Orchestra) "Multi-Love"
- Martin Andrews (Martin Andrews) "Naomi"
- Jolyon Mulholland (Mulholland) "Perfect Health"
- Marlon Gerbes/Matiu Walters/Priese Board (Six60) "Special"
- Evan Sinton/Jaden Parkes/Josh Fountain (Maala) "Touch"
- Sean Donnelly (SJD) "Unplugged"
- Anthonie Tonnon (Anthonie Tonnon) "Water Underground"
- Bill Urale/James Britt (King Kapisi) "Welcome Back"
- Ella Yelich-O'Connor/ Joel Little (Lorde) "Yellow Flicker Beat"

=== Silver Scroll 1981 ===
The Silver Scroll award was not awarded in 1981, so APRA retrospectively presented the award as part of the 2015 ceremony. In July 2015 a short list of five songs from the 1981 eligibility period was announced.

Songwriter(s)	Act	Song
Phil Judd/Wayne Stevens/Mark Hough	The Swingers	"Counting The Beat"
Don McGlashan/Richard von Sturmer	Blam Blam Blam	"There is No Depression in New Zealand"
Neil Finn	Split Enz	"One Step Ahead"
Michael O'Neill/Peter van der Fluit/Lawrence Landwer-Johan/Tony Drumm	Screaming Meemees	"See Me Go"
Robert Scott/David Kilgour/Hamish Kilgour	The Clean	"Tally Ho"

== New Zealand Music Hall of Fame ==
Steel guitar player Bill Sevesi was inducted into the New Zealand Music Hall of Fame as APRA New Zealand's 2015 inductee.

== Other awards ==
Six other awards were presented at the Silver Scroll Awards: APRA Maioha Award (for excellence in contemporary Maori music), SOUNZ Contemporary Award (for creativity and inspiration in composition), two awards acknowledging songs with the most radio and television play in New Zealand and overseas, and APRA Best Original Music in a Feature Film Award and APRA Best Original Music in a Series Award.

Award	Nominees
APRA Maioha Award	Vince Harder, Stan Walker, and Troy Kingi "Aotearoa" (Stan Walker, Troy Kingi, Ria Hall and Maisey Rika); Ranea Aperahama "Ki Uta / Rangai Maomao" (Ranea); Scotty Morrison, Paddy Free and Moana Maniapoto "Upokohue" (Moana and the Tribe)
SOUNZ Contemporary Award	Chris Watson "sing songs self" a single movement piano concerto; Ross Harris "Piano Quintet" for two violins, viola, cello and piano; Reuben Jelleyman "Expanse" for mezzo-soprano and chamber ensemble
APRA Best Original Music in a Feature Film Award	Grayson Gilmour Consent; Mahuia Bridgman-Cooper Housebound; Dana Lund The Dark Horse
APRA Best Original Music in a Series Award	Tom McLeod Girl vs. Boy (Series 3); Emile de la Rey Hope and Wire; David Donaldson, Janet Roddick and Stephen Roche Life Force (Season 2 – "Mutant Planet")
Most Performed Work in New Zealand	Matiu Walters, Marlon Gerbes and Priese Board "Special" (Six60)
Most Performed Work in Overseas	Ella Yelich-O'Connor and Joel Little - "Royals" (Lorde)

== APRA song awards ==
Outside of the Silver Scroll Awards, APRA presented five genre awards in 2015. The APRA Best Pacific Song was presented at the Pacific Music Awards, the APRA Best Country Music Song was presented at the New Zealand Country Music Awards, the APRA Best Māori Songwriter was presented at the Waiata Maori Music Awards and the APRA Children's Song of the Year and What Now Video of the Year were presented live on What Now.

Award	Songwriter(s)	Act	Song
APRA Best Pacific Song	TBA	Smashproof	“Survivors" (featuring Pieter T)
APRA Best Country Music Song	Kaylee Bell & Jared Porter	Kaylee Bell & Jared Porter	"Pieces"
APRA Best Māori Songwriter	Ranea Aperahama	—N/a	—N/a
APRA Children's Song of the Year	Levity Beet and Daniel Stryczek	Levity Beet and Daniel Stryczek	"There’s One in the Bush"
What Now Children's Video of the Year	Stephen Templer and Ross Payne (directors)	fleaBITE	"Don’t Sit Under the Poo Tree"
