= Salina Fisher =

New Zealand composer and violinist

- Born: 6 October 1993 (age 33)
- Origin: New Zealand
- Occupation: Composer
- Instrument: Violin
- Website: www.salinafisher.com

Salina Fisher (born 6 October 1993) is a New Zealand composer and violinist currently based in Wellington.

Fisher was Concertmaster of the NZSO National Youth Orchestra in 2012-2013. She graduated from the New Zealand School of Music and then studied for a Master of Music in Composition at the Manhattan School of Music in New York. In 2014 Fisher's work Blushing Skies received the Orchestra's Choice Award. She is the youngest-ever winner of the SOUNZ Contemporary Award for her orchestral work Rainphase, subsequently winning in 2017 for her string quartet Tōrino. Tōrino was selected to represent New Zealand at the ISCM World Music Days in Vancouver, BC, Canada and was performed there in November 2017. by the Emily Carr String Quartet. She was awarded a Fulbright New Zealand General Graduate Award. She is the recipient of the New Generation Award.

A new work by Fisher will be played by the New Zealand Symphony Orchestra at the reopening of the refurbished Wellington Town Hall in February 2027.
