= 2006 APRA Silver Scroll Awards =

Annual New Zealand songwriting awards

- Awarded for: Excellence in New Zealand songwriting
- Date: September 20, 2006
- Location: Auckland Town Hall, Auckland
- Country: New Zealand
- Presented by: APRA New Zealand | Australasian Mechanical Copyright Owners Society
- Hosted by: Marcus Lush
- Website: apra-amcos.co.nz/apra-awards.aspx

The 2006 APRA Silver Scroll Awards were held on Wednesday 20 September 2006 at the Auckland Town Hall, celebrating excellence in New Zealand songwriting. The Silver Scroll Award was presented to Don McGlashan for his song "Bathe In the River", originally performed by the Mt Raskil Preservation Society for the soundtrack of the New Zealand film No. 2. This was the final year where winners were selected by genre-specific panels of judges.

== Silver Scroll Award ==
The Silver Scroll Award celebrates outstanding achievement in songwriting of original New Zealand pop music. The evening's music performances were produced by composers Victoria Kelly and Joost Langeveld. Each of the nominated songs were covered in a new style by another artist.

Songwriter(s)	Act	Song
Anika Moa	Anika Moa	"Stolen Hill"
Dann Hume, Jon Hume, Peter Hume	Evermore	"Running"
Don McGlashan	Mt Raskil Preservation Society	"Bathe In the River"
Don McGlashan	Don McGlashan	"Miracle Sun"
James Milne	Lawrence Arabia and The Reduction Agents	"The Pool"

== Other awards ==
Four other awards were presented at the Silver Scroll Awards: APRA Maioha Award (for excellence in contemporary Maori music), SOUNZ Contemporary Award (for creativity and inspiration in classical composition) and two awards acknowledging songs with the most radio and television play in New Zealand and overseas.

=== APRA Maioha Award ===
Songwriter(s)	Act	Song
Richard Bennett	"E Hine"	Richard Bennett
Ngatai Huata	"Matariki"	Ngatai Huata
Mahinarangi Tocker and Rihitapuwae Tocker	"Taku Kotiro"	Mahinarangi Tocker and Rihitapuwae Tocker

=== SOUNZ Contemporary Award ===
Songwriter(s)	Song
Ross Harris	"Symphony No. 2 for mezzo soprano and orchestra"
Eve de Castro-Robinson	"Releasing the Angel"
Dylan Lardelli	"Tumbu"

=== Most Performed Works ===
Award	Songwriter(s)	Act	Song
Most Performed Work in New Zealand	James Reid	The Feelers	"Stand Up"
Most Performed Work in Overseas	Neil Finn	Crowded House	"Don't Dream It's Over"

== APRA song awards ==
Outside of the Silver Scroll Awards, APRA presented two genre awards in 2006. The APRA Best Pacific Song was presented at the Pacific Music Awards and the APRA Best Country Music Song was presented at the New Zealand Country Music Awards.

Award	Songwriter(s)	Act	Song
APRA Best Pacific Song	Demetrius Savelio	Savage	"Swing"
APRA Best Country Music Song	Jools Topp	Topp Twins	"Tamworth"
