= 2013 APRA Silver Scroll Awards =

Annual New Zealand songwriting awards

- Awarded for: Excellence in New Zealand songwriting
- Date: 15 October 2013
- Location: Vector Arena, Auckland
- Country: New Zealand
- Presented by: APRA New Zealand-Australasian Mechanical Copyright Owners Society
- Hosted by: Dai Henwood
- Website: apra-amcos.co.nz/apra-awards.aspx

The 2013 APRA Silver Scroll Awards were held on Tuesday 15 October 2013 at Vector Arena in Auckland, celebrating excellence in New Zealand songwriting. This is the first year the ceremony was held at Vector Arena, moving from its previous location of the Auckland Town Hall in order to accommodate more of APRA's 8000 New Zealand members.

The Silver Scroll award was presented to Ella Yelich-O'Connor and Joel Little for "Royals" by Lorde, and singer-songwriter Dave Dobbyn was inducted into the New Zealand Music Hall of Fame. The award for The Most Performed Work Overseas went to Brooke Fraser and Scott Ligertwood for “Something in the Water”, ending the 13-year run of Neil Finn's Crowded House song "Don't Dream It's Over". Brenda Makamoeafi and Hassanah Iroegbu of 1990s hip hop duo Sisters Underground reunited to perform their 1994 hit "In the Neighbourhood".

== Silver Scroll award ==
The Silver Scroll award celebrates outstanding achievement in songwriting of original New Zealand pop music. The evening's music performances were produced by musician Godfrey De Grut. Each of the nominated songs were covered in a new style by another artist. The Silver Scroll award was presented by 1996 winner Bic Runga.

Songwriter(s)	Act	Song	Covering artist
Anna Coddington	Anna Coddington	"Bird In Hand"	Sola Rosa
Aaradhna, Evan Short, Peter Wadams	Aaradhna	"Wake Up"	Drum trio (Nick Gaffney, Scotty Pearson and Katie Everingham)
Cy Winstanley	Tattletale Saints	"Complicated Man"	Jesse Sheehan
Ella Yelich-O'Connor, Joel Little	Lorde	"Royals"	Bella Kalolo (Alongside Lionel Reekie on accordion and Phillip Fan with beatbox)
Luke Buda, Sam Scott, Thomas Callwood, Richie Singleton, Chris O’Connor, Conrad Wedde, William Ricketts	The Phoenix Foundation	"Thames Soup"	Rackets

=== Longlist ===
In July 2013, a top-20 longlist was announced. From this list APRA members voted to decide the year's shortlist. The voting period ran from 25 July to 18 August.

- Matthew Hope, Alexander Freer, Jonathan Pearce, Reuben Stephens (Artisan Guns) "Baby Blue"
- Anna Coddington "Bird In Hand"
- Marlon Williams, Delaney Davidson (Marlon Williams & Delaney Davidson) "Bloodletter"
- Robin Hinkley (Sharkness) "Cobra Jacket"
- Cy Winstanley (Tattletale Saints) "Complicated Man"
- Tom Scott, Lui Tuiasau / Hayden Dick (@Peace) "Flowers"
- Karoline Tamati, Brent Park (Ladi6) "Ikarus"
- Ryan McPhun (The Ruby Suns) "Kingfisher Call Me"
- Mahuia Bridgman Cooper, Katie Scott (Kittens of the Internet) "Living the Dream"
- Lauren Barus (L.A. Mitchell) "Lose the Game"
- Matiu Walters, Ji Fraser, Christian McDonough, Eli Paewai (Six60) "Lost"
- Tama Waipara, Aaron Nevezie (Tama Waipara) "Medicine Man"
- Chelsea Metcalf, James Duncan (Watercolours) "Pazzida"
- Ella Yelich-O'Connor, Joel Little (Lorde) "Royals"
- Matt Langley "Sad Sound Good"
- Brendan McKenna (Urbantramper) "Sailors"
- Luke Buda, Sam Scott, Thomas Callwood, Richie Singleton, Chris O’Connor, Conrad Wedde, William Ricketts (The Phoenix Foundation) "Thames Soup"
- James Milne (Lawrence Arabia) "The Listening Times"
- Aaradhna Patel, Evan Short, Peter Wadams (Aaradhna) "Wake Up"
- Tipene Williams, Justin Ferguson (Tipene) "West Side Hori"

== New Zealand Music Hall of Fame ==
Musician, singer-songwriter and producer Dave Dobbyn was inducted into the New Zealand Music Hall of Fame. He is a three-time recipient of the Silver Scroll award. He was inducted by musician Warren Maxwell, along with performances of three Dobbyn songs: "Language" by Tami Nielson, "It Dawned On Me" by Mark Vanilau and Scribe, and "Be Mine Tonight" by Shihad.

== Other awards ==
Four other awards were presented at the Silver Scroll Awards: APRA Maioha Award (for excellence in contemporary Maori music), SOUNZ Contemporary Award (for creativity and inspiration in composition) and two awards acknowledging songs with the most radio and television play in New Zealand and overseas.

The APRA Maioha Award-winning song "Ruaimoko" was performed by Tama Waipara with the University of Auckland percussion ensemble, and the SOUNZ Contemporary Award-winning composition "Lightbox" was performed by the MPC Trio (Jeremy Toy, Lewis McCallum, and Johnnie Fleury).

Award	Songwriter(s)	Act	Song
APRA Maioha Award	Kimo Winiata, Keelan Ransfield, Moses Ketu and Liam Ogden	IWI	"E Te Iwi"
APRA Maioha Award	Maisey Rika, Te Kahautu Maxwell, and Mahuia Bridgman-Cooper	Maisey Rika, featuring Anika Moa	"Ruaimoko"
APRA Maioha Award	Ngatapa Black and Julian Wilcox	Ngatapa Black	"Te Ngakau Mamae"
SOUNZ Contemporary Award	Karlo Margetic	for piano trio	"Lightbox"
SOUNZ Contemporary Award	Michael Norris	a live score for dance-film, for two violins, cello and piano	"TIMEDANCE"
SOUNZ Contemporary Award	Chris Gendall	for piano trio and orchestra	"Triple Concerto"
Most Performed Work in New Zealand	Brooke Fraser & Scott Ligertwood	Brooke Fraser	"Something in the Water"
Most Performed Work in Overseas	Brooke Fraser & Scott Ligertwood	Brooke Fraser	"Something in the Water"

== APRA song awards ==
Outside of the Silver Scroll Awards, APRA presented four genre awards in 2013. The APRA Best Pacific Song was presented at the Pacific Music Awards, the APRA Best Country Music Song was presented at the New Zealand Country Music Awards and the APRA Children's Song of the Year and What Now Video of the Year were presented at StarFest.

Award	Songwriter(s)	Act	Song
APRA Best Pacific Song	Aaradhna Patel, Evan Short, Peter Wadams	Aaradhna	"Wake Up"
APRA Best Country Music Song	Marlon Williams, Delaney Davidson	Marlon Williams & Delaney Davidson	"Bloodletter"
APRA Children's Song of the Year	Chanelle Davis	Chanelle Davis	"If I Was a Fuzzy Buzzy Bumblebee"
What Now Video of the Year	Raymond McGrath	Raymond McGrath	"It's Not a Monster, It's Me!"

== APRA Professional Development Awards ==
Awarded biennially, the Professional Developments Awards is a cash prize given three artists to help build their musical career. Grants are awarded in three categories: pop/contemporary, film and television, and classical. In 2013, $12,000 and professional services were awarded to each recipient.

Category	Artist
Pop/contemporary	Nick Gaffaney
Film and television	Karl Steven
Classical	Alex Taylor
