= Bachelorette (singer) =

- Origin: Christchurch, New Zealand
- Genres: Synthpop
- Years active: 2004–present
- Label: Drag City
- Website: Particletracks.com

Bachelorette is the musical project of New Zealander Annabel Alpers. Formed in 2004 in Christchurch, Bachelorette mixes '60s psychedelia and girl-group pop with folk and vintage electronics.

Prior to Bachelorette, Alpers played in Christchurch surf-band Hawaii Five-O and Hiss Explosion.

== Musical career ==
Bachelorette envisions herself surrounded by her computer ‘musicians’; her songs “often start simply and spiral outward like cotton candy in the making.”. Bachelorette’s music was originally crafted with thrift-store found instruments, resulting in psychedelic computer folk music, "a student of computer-based composition", or a “lo-fi, one-woman version of Animal Collective.”

Alpers tends to write all albums in isolation in various countryside locales: the Canterbury Hills and west coast of New Zealand, and in rural Virginia. Her music is of that interdependent relationship - sometimes romantic - that exists between humans and machine, where one cannot successfully conquer the other. After touring the United States in 2008, Drag City put out Bachelorette's first international release, My Electric Family. Bachelorette's songs "Long Time Gone" and "Her Rotating Head" were used in Grey's Anatomy episodes 6.04 and 6.08, respectively. Bachelorette has since toured with The Magnetic Fields, Bonnie 'Prince' Billy, Bill Callahan, Animal Collective, Low, Beach House, and Peter Bjorn & John, in addition to her own headline tours in the US and Europe.

Bachelorette's self-titled album Bachelorette was released internationally the week of May 16, 2011. Don't Panic Magazine described it as "pretty and unsettling, like a balloon floating towards a nail". Alpers has suggested both through the album's lyrics and in interviews that Bachelorette will be her final album recording under this moniker. Bachelorette toured Europe, the UK and the US intermittently throughout 2011 in support of this release.

== Discography ==
Studio albums

- Isolation Loops (2007), Electroplate/Mistletone; Re-released as LP 2010, Drag City
- My Electric Family (2009), Drag City/Mistletone/Particle Tracks
- Bachelorette (2011), Drag City/Souterrain Transmissions/Mistletone/Particle Tracks

EP

- "The End of Things"(2005), Arch Hill Recordings; Re-released as LP 2010, Drag City

Single

- "Do The Circuit" b/w "I Want To Be Your Girlfriend" (2009), Drag City
