= Stroma (musical group) =

Chamber ensemble based in New Zealand

- Origin: Wellington, New Zealand
- Genres: Classical, experimental
- Years active: 2000–present
- Members: Michael Norris, Hamish McKeich, Bridget Douglas, Patrick Barry, Mark Carter, David Bremner, Thomas Guldborg, Lenny Sakofsky, Vesa-Matti Lepännen, Emma Barron, Rebecca Struthers, Anna van der Zee, Megan Molina, Kristina Zelinska, Andrew Thompson, Ken Ichinose, Alexander Gunchenko
- Website: stroma.co.nz

Stroma is a mixed chamber ensemble based in Wellington, New Zealand. It is New Zealand’s largest chamber ensemble, able to draw on over 20 players, many of whom are principal players with the New Zealand Symphony Orchestra (NZSO). It focuses on music written in the last 100 years, and has been active since 2000. It has commissioned and/or premiered over 50 New Zealand works, and has given repeat performances to another 40.

Stroma has also collaborated with musicians and artists from other genres, such as jazz musicians (e.g. Jeff Henderson), taonga pūoro players (e.g. Richard Nunns) and choreographers (e.g. Daniel Belton).

Because the members are largely affiliated with the New Zealand Symphony Orchestra, usually fewer than 10 concerts a year are given by Stroma. NZSO principals have included Vesa-Matti Leppänen (violin), Bridget Douglas (flute), and Ed Allen MNZM (horn).

== History ==
Stroma was established in 2000 by Hamish McKeich, Michael Norris, Bridget Douglas and Philip Brownlee, with McKeich as its conductor. Its first concert, Wind, Rain & Light featured the music of Toru Takemitsu, James Gardner, Philip Brownlee, György Ligeti, Kaija Saariaho, Paul Booth, Michael Norris and Jenny McLeod. Since then, it has staged over 50 concerts throughout New Zealand, and has appeared at the New Zealand Festival in 2002, 2004, 2006, 2008 and 2010, the International Jazz Festival 2003, the Wellington Cathedral Festival 2003, the Christchurch Festival of the Arts 2005 and the Tempo and Body Festivals in 2012. They also toured for Chamber Music New Zealand in 2004, and The New Zealand Herald music critic William Dart commented that for their eclectic mixing of pieces by composers from New Zealand (Ross Harris), the United States (George Crumb), and France (Olivier Messiaen; they played his Quatuor pour la fin du temps), they gained "cheers all round".

While Stroma's programmes are primarily focused on domestic composers and performers, it has also worked with international musicians (some of whom are New Zealanders) as Roberto Fabbriciani, Nicholas Isherwood, Richard Nunns, Madeleine Pierard (performing Pierrot Lunaire in 2012), Lars Mlekusch, the Duo Stump-Linshalm, Simon Docking, Adam Page, Richard Haynes, Warren Maxwell and Pedro Carneiro.

In 2015, Stroma gave a tribute concert Nine Echoes to New Zealand composer Douglas Lilburn on his 100th birthday at the Sacred Heart Cathedral in Wellington. In 2016, ten of their players accompanied the opera Brass Poppies, produced by Ross Harris and Vincent O'Sullivan and set in Wellington at a time when soldiers were leaving for Gallipoli. Stroma contributed one piece to the double album set Passing By of compositions by New Zealand composer Jack Body. The album was released on 30 April 2015, only days before Body's death.
