= Love Love Love (Avalanche City song) =

Single by Avalanche City

from the album Our New Life Above the Ground
- Released: 10 March 2011
- Genre: Indie folk
- Length: 3:12
- Label: Warner Music New Zealand
- Songwriter: Dave Baxter

Avalanche City singles chronology
"Love Love Love" (2011)	"Ends in the Ocean" (2011)

"Love Love Love" is the debut single from New Zealand folk band Avalanche City. The song was originally released as a free download in October 2010, where it was downloaded over 11,000 times until it was taken down in February 2011. The song was then used for a station promotion ad for TV2. The wider exposure lead to the song being released for sale in March, after which it debuted at number one on New Zealand's singles chart and charted for 19 weeks, eventually earning a 2× Platinum certification. The song was also a minor hit in Australia, charting on the ARIA Singles Chart for a single week at number 49 in September 2011.

== Music video ==
A music video for the song was released in December 2011. Directed by Josh Smith, the video is a whimsical animated tale of two penguins who experience an adventure at sea.

== Awards ==
Songwriter Dave Baxter won the 2011 APRA Silver Scroll Award for the song. It was also nominated for Single of the Year at the 2011 New Zealand Music Awards.
