= Chester Travis =

New Zealand filmmaker, author and musician

- Born: 4 July 1987 (age 39)
- Origin: Christchurch, New Zealand
- Genres: Alt Country, Rock and Folk
- Occupations: Film maker; Author; Musician
- Instruments: Vocals, guitar, piano
- Years active: 2006–present
- Website: chestertravis.com

Chester Travis (born 4 July 1987) is a New Zealand film maker, author and musician. His most notable works include his music video for Kimbra's "Goldmine".

"Goldmine" was filmed in a factory in Berlin. It was shot in black-and-white using a high amount of stop-motion animation; and was co-directed by Timothy Armstrong.

The music video has received critical acclaim. Rolling Stone called the video "stunning"; while Paley Martin of Billboard proclaimed it as "an artful and edgy [...] piece set to a soul-piercing soundtrack". Scott Heins of Okayplayer described the video as "hypnotic".

In 2015, his ten part web series, "How To Be Gay" won Best Queer Series at San Francisco Web Festival.

Travis is also a musician, going by the stage name Great Danes. In 2016, Great Danes released their first EP and toured with Scottish rock band, Travis.

In 2017, Travis composed three songs for the Amazon Series You Are Wanted.

In June 2017, Travis received the APRA Best Country Music Song for Toothache at the 2017 New Zealand Music Awards.

== Music Videos ==
- "Like They Do On The TV" - Kimbra (2018)
- "Everybody Knows Rework" - Kimbra/Apothek (2017)
- "Where The Down Bit Starts" - Great Danes/Kimbra (2016)
- "Goldmine" - Kimbra (2015)
- "Alive" - Pause Applause (2014)
- "The Gold Route" - Unmap (2014)
- "Einundzwanzig" - Jan Roth (2014)

== Books ==
- My Summer Snowman, (2013) Curved House ISBN 978-0992730215
