= 2007 APRA Silver Scroll Awards =

Annual New Zealand songwriting awards

- Awarded for: Excellence in New Zealand songwriting
- Date: September 18, 2007
- Location: Auckland Town Hall, Auckland
- Country: New Zealand
- Presented by: APRA New Zealand-Australasian Mechanical Copyright Owners Society
- Website: apra-amcos.co.nz/apra-awards.aspx

The 2007 APRA Silver Scroll Awards were held on Tuesday 18 September 2007 at the Auckland Town Hall, celebrating excellence in New Zealand songwriting. The Silver Scroll Award was presented to Brooke Fraser for her song "Albertine", and singer Jordan Luck was inducted into the New Zealand Music Hall of Fame as its inaugural member. This was also the first year that the finalists and winners were selected by online votes by APRA members instead of an anonymous panel.

== Silver Scroll Award ==
The Silver Scroll Award celebrates outstanding achievement in songwriting of original New Zealand pop music.

Songwriter(s)	Act	Song
Brooke Fraser	Brooke Fraser	"Albertine"
Jason Kerrison, Bobby Kennedy, Matt Treacy and Clinton Harris	Opshop	"Maybe"
Liam Finn	Liam Finn	"Second Chance"
Ruban Nielson	The Mint Chicks	"Crazy? Yes! Dumb? No!"
Sean Donnelly	SJD	"Beautiful Haze"

=== Long list ===
In July 2007 a top-20 long list was announced. The list was selected by a panel of judges, with APRA members voting on it to select the five finalists and winner.

- Brooke Fraser "Albertine" (Brooke Fraser)
- Greg Johnson and Ted Brown "Anyone Can Say Goodbye" (Greg Johnson)
- Sean Donnelly "Beautiful Haze" (SJD)
- Sean Cunningham, Ben Campbell and Beth Campbell "Crawl" (Atlas)
- Ruban Nielson "Crazy? Yes! Dumb? No!" (The Mint Chicks)
- Brooke Fraser "Deciphering Me" (Brooke Fraser)
- Neil Finn "Don't Stop Now" (Crowded House)
- Boh Runga "For a While" (Stellar)
- Miriam Clancy "Girl About Town" (Miriam Clancy)
- Hollie Smith and Jeremy Toy "I Will Do" (Hollie Smith)
- Sean Donnelly "I Will Not Let You Down" (Don McGlashan)
- Dann Hume and Jon Hume "Light Surrounding You" (Evermore)
- Jason Kerrison, Bobby Kennedy, Matt Treacy and Clinton Harris "Maybe" (Opshop)
- Redford Grenell, Devin Abrams, Nick Robinson, Sam Trevethick and Paora Apera "One" (Shapeshifter)
- Jeremy Toy, Julien Dyne, Lewis McCallum and Tyra Hammond "Rise Up (part 2)" (Opensouls)
- Liam Finn "Second Chance" (Liam Finn)
- Julia Deans, Andrew Bain and Simon Braxton "The Way To Breathe" (Fur Patrol)
- Victoria Girling-Butcher "This Soldier" (Lucid 3)
- Buzz Moller "We're So Lost" (Voom)
- Shayne Carter "What's A Few Tears To the Ocean" (Dimmer)

== New Zealand Music Hall of Fame ==
Singer and songwriter Jordan Luck was inducted into the New Zealand Music Hall of Fame by Mike Chunn. Luck was the inaugural member of the newly formed Hall of Fame.

== Other awards ==
Four other awards were presented at the Silver Scroll Awards: APRA Maioha Award (for excellence in contemporary Maori music), SOUNZ Contemporary Award (for creativity and inspiration in classical composition) and two awards acknowledging songs with the most radio and television play in New Zealand and overseas.

=== APRA Maioha Award ===
Songwriter(s)	Act	Song
Andrea Tunks and Pierre	Andrea Tunks and Pierre	"Tohe Aio"
Mika	Mika and the Plastic Maori Band	"Poti"
Marian Mare	Marian Mare	"Tenei Tamaiti"

=== SOUNZ Contemporary Award ===
Songwriter(s)	Song
Eve de Castro-Robinson	"These Arms to Hold You"
Christopher Blake	"Anthem on the Kaipara"
Ross Harris	"The Sleep Of Reason"

=== Most Performed Works ===
Award	Songwriter(s)	Act	Song
Most Performed Work in New Zealand	Brooke Fraser	Brooke Fraser	"Deciphering Me"
Most Performed Work in Overseas	Neil Finn	Crowded House	"Don't Dream It's Over"

== APRA song awards ==
Outside of the Silver Scroll Awards, APRA presented two genre awards in 2007. The APRA Best Pacific Song was presented at the Pacific Music Awards, the APRA Best Country Music Song was presented at the New Zealand Country Music Awards and the inaugural APRA Children’s Song of the Year and What Now Video of the Year were presented at StarFest.

Award	Songwriter(s)	Act	Song
APRA Best Pacific Song	Spacifix	Spacifix	"Gotta Get Like This"
APRA Best Country Music Song	Barry Saunders	Barry Saunders	"Pale Sun"
