= One Day (Opshop song) =

Single by Opshop

from the album Second Hand Planet
- Released: 2007
- Recorded: 2007
- Genre: Alternative rock
- Length: 4:25
- Label: Siren/EMI
- Songwriters: Jason Kerrison, Bobby Kennedy, Matt Treacy, Clint Harris

Opshop singles chronology
"Waiting Now" (2007)	"One Day" (2007)	"Big Energy In Little Spaces" (2008)

"One Day" is the third single from New Zealand band Opshop's second studio album, Second Hand Planet.

The song won the 2008 APRA Silver Scroll for Song of the Year.

The video features New Zealand singer Dianne Swann, previously in the bands Everything That Flies, When The Cat's Away and currently performing with Brett Adams as The Bads.

10 years after release, the song featured on soap opera Shortland Street during the death scene of long-running character Marj Brasch (Elizabeth McRae). Following a positive audience and critical response, the song re-entered the New Zealand iTunes charts.

== Charts ==
Chart (2009)	Peak position	Sales
New Zealand Singles Chart	4	7,500+ (Platinum)

== Certifications ==
Region	Certification	Certified units/sales
New Zealand (RMNZ)	3× Platinum	90,000^{‡}
^{‡} Sales+streaming figures based on certification alone.
