= New Zealand Music Hall of Fame =

- Awarded for: Artists who have made a significant long-term contribution to New Zealand music
- Date: 2007
- Country: New Zealand
- Presented by: APRA AMCOS New Zealand and Recorded Music New Zealand
- Reward: Soundshell sculpture
- First award: 2007
- Latest award: 2025
- Website: musichall.co.nz

The New Zealand Music Hall of Fame | Te Whare Taonga Puoro o Aotearoa is a figurative hall of fame dedicated to noteworthy New Zealand musicians.

The hall was created in 2007 by Recorded Music NZ (then known as the Recording Industry Association of New Zealand (RIANZ)) and the Australasian Performing Right Association (APRA). Two inductions are made into the hall each year, one at the APRA Silver Scroll Awards, decided by APRA, and the other is awarded as part of the Aotearoa Music Awards, chosen by Recorded Music NZ.

The Exponents frontman Jordan Luck has been inducted twice, first as the inaugural inductee at the 2007 APRA Silver Scroll Awards and again with his band The Exponents at the 2015 New Zealand Music Awards.

== Eligibility ==
To be eligible for induction into the Hall of Fame, the artist must have released a work or achieve another significant professional milestone at least 20 years prior. They must also have shown musical excellence in their career. Also considered is the significance and influence and the impact of the artist's work on New Zealand music.

== Award ==
Both the APRA and the Recorded Music NZ inductees receive a framed certificate to mark their induction as well as the Hall of Fame "soundshell", created by sculptor Jim Wheeler. The Recorded Music NZ inductees also receive the Legacy Award which is represented as a platinum Tui trophy.

== Controversy ==
Salmonella Dub turned down the opportunity to be the 2017 Legacy Award winner and Hall of Fame inductee at the 2017 New Zealand Music Awards. The band requested that Wellington post-punk band Beat Rhythm Fashion perform as part of the induction ceremony, but the award organisers turned down the request, saying that Beat Rhythm Fashion was "too obscure" for the broad television audience of the music awards. Salmonella Dub then turned down the Hall of Fame entry. Andrew Penman of Salmonella Dub stated: "The producer thought that Beat Rhythm Fashion was too obscure and would confuse the audience and take too much work to explain to them. I said 'if that's the case I don't want to be there', then I didn't hear anything back."

Indie rock band The Clean have twice turned down the opportunity to be inducted into the Hall of Fame. Band member Robert Scott explained, "We feel we are outside the industry, and in the past we were shunned and dismissed and it seems like by saying yes we would be forgiving the industry for that." The group have since been inducted into the hall.

== List of inducted artists ==
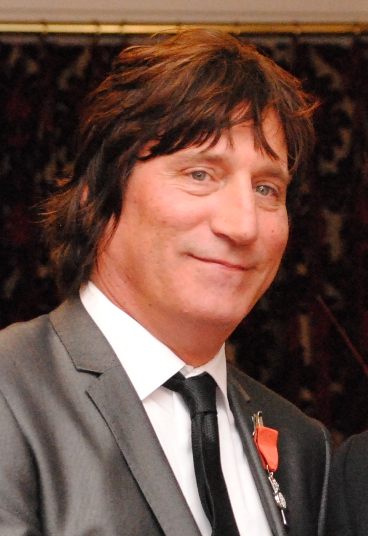
Jordan Luck was inducted as a solo artist in 2007, and later with his band The Exponents in 2015

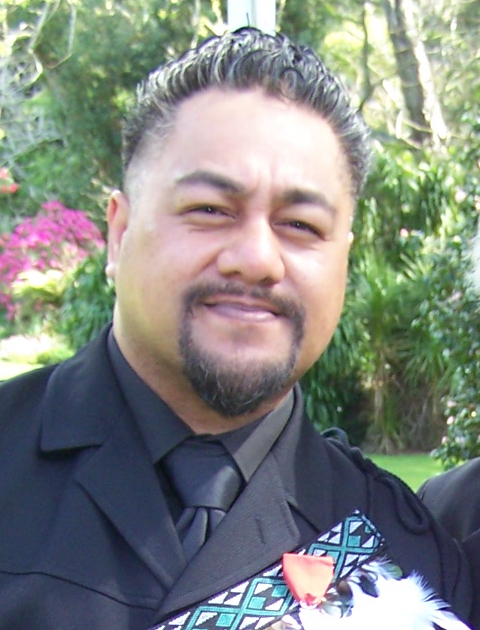
Che Fu was inducted as part of Supergroove in 2014, and as an individual in 2026

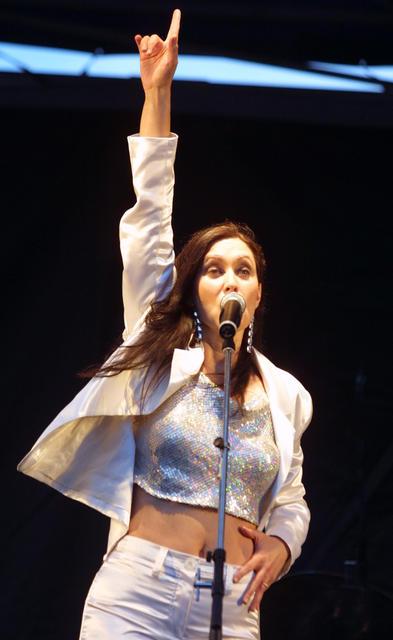
Margaret Urlich was among the inductees of 2021

Groups have their members listed below the group name.

Year	Artists	
Year	APRA inductee (APRA Silver Scroll Awards)	Recorded Music NZ inductee (Aotearoa Music Awards)
2007	Jordan Luck	Johnny Devlin
2008	Topp Twins: Jools Topp; Lynda Topp	Straitjacket Fits: Shayne Carter; John Collie; David Wood; Andrew Brough; Mark Peterson
2009	Hirini Melbourne; Richard Nunns	Ray Columbus & the Invaders: Ray Columbus; Dave Russell; Wally Scott; Billy Kristian; Jimmy Hill
2010	The Fourmyula: Wayne Mason; Martin Hope; Ali Richardson; Chris Parry; Carl Evensen	Shihad: Jon Toogood; Tom Larkin; Phil Knight; Karl Kippenberger
2011	Hello Sailor: Graham Brazier; Dave McArtney; Harry Lyon; Rick Ball; Stuart Pearce; Paul Woolright	Dragon: Marc Hunter; Todd Hunter; Paul Hewson; Neil Storey; Kerry Jacobson; Alan Mansfield; Robert Taylor
2012	Herbs: Dilworth Karaka; Toni Fonoti; Phil Toms; Spencer Fusimalohi; John Berkley; Fred Faleauto; Charles Tumahai; Maurice Watene; Tama Lundon; Jack Allen; Carl Perkins; Willie Hona; Thom Nepia; Tama Renata; Gordon Joll; Grant Pukeroa; Kristen Hapi	Toy Love: Chris Knox; Alec Bathgate; Paul Kean; Jane Walker; Mike Dooley
2013	Dave Dobbyn	Shona Laing
2014	Douglas Lilburn	Supergroove: Che Ness; Karl Steven; Joe Lonie; Tim Stewart; Ben Sciascia; Ian Jones; Nick Atkinson; Paul Russell
2015	Bill Sevesi	The Exponents: Jordan Luck; Brian Jones; David Gent; Michael "Harry" Harallambi; Stephen Cowan; Chris Sheehan; Dave Barraclough
2016	Moana Maniapoto	Bic Runga
2017	The Clean: David Kilgour; Hamish Kilgour; Peter Gutteridge; Robert Scott	Sharon O'Neill
2018	Jenny Morris	Upper Hutt Posse: Dean Hapeta (D Word); Matthew Hapeta (MC Wiya); Bennett Pomana (MC Beware); Steve Rameka (Acid Dread); Teremoana Rapley; Aaron Thompson (Blue Dread); Darryl Thomson (DLT)
2019	Jim Carter; Ruru Karaitiana; Pixie Williams	Th' Dudes: Dave Dobbyn; Ian Morris; Peter Urlich; Lez White; Peter Coleman; Bruce Hambling
2020	The Chicks: Judy Donaldson; Sue Donaldson; Max Merritt; Dinah Lee; Peter Posa; Larry's Rebels: Larry Morris; John Williams; Denis "Nooky" Stott; Terry Rouse; Viv McCarthy; Johnny Cooper	Debbie Harwood; Dianne Swann; Margaret Urlich; Annie Crummer; Kim Willoughby
2022	Ngoi Pēwhairangi; Tuini Ngāwai	
2023	Don McGlashan	
2024	Mike Nock	Hinewehi Mohi
2025	The Warratahs	
2026		Che Fu
