= Jonathan Bree =

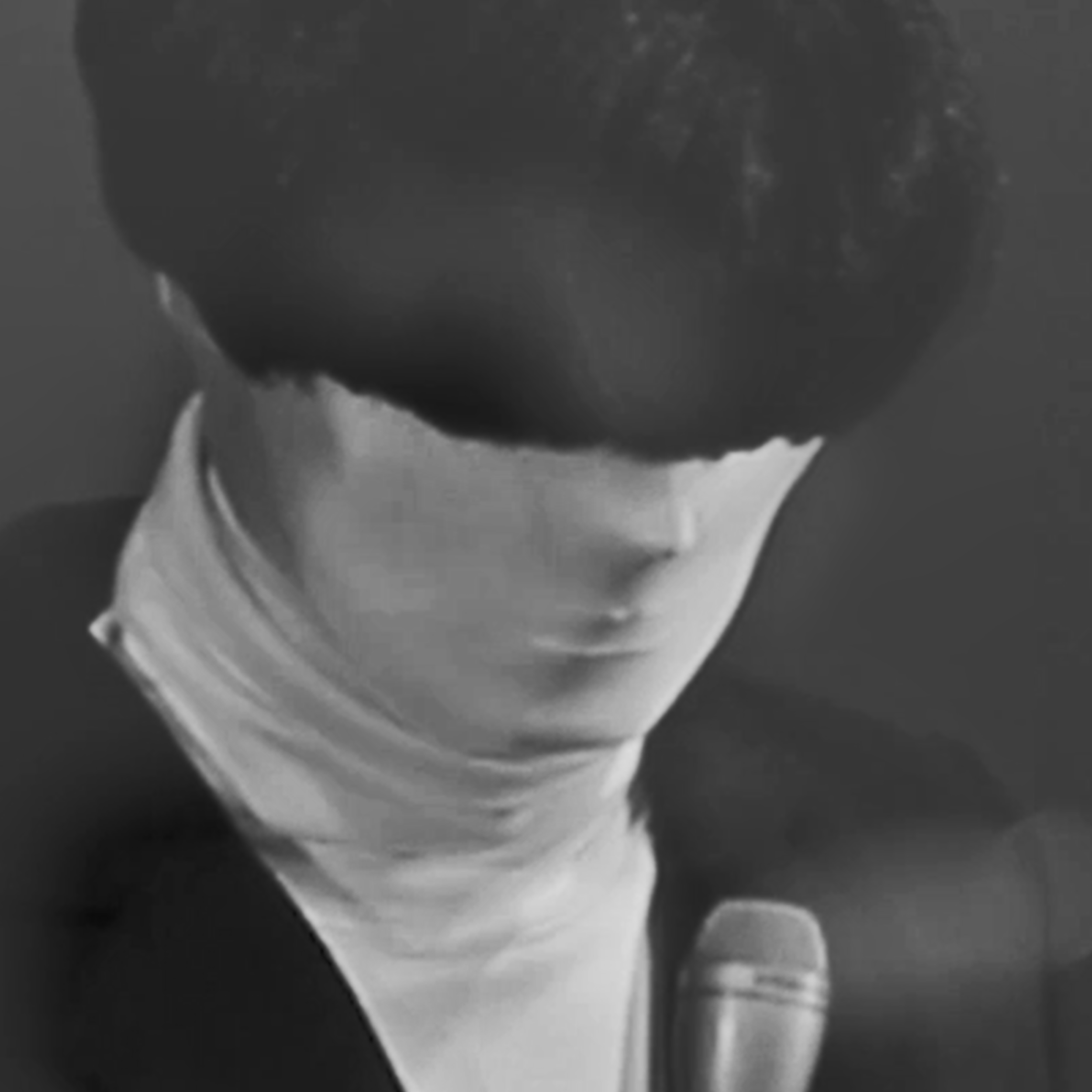
- Jonathan Bree still from the filming of the music video for "You're So Cool"

Background information
- Born: Jonathan Owen Bree; September 1, 1979 (age 47)
- Origin: New Zealand
- Genres: New wave, indie pop, chamber pop, baroque pop
- Occupations: Record producer, musician, singer-songwriter
- Instruments: Vocals, guitar, keyboards, drums
- Years active: 1990s–present
- Label: Lil' Chief Records
- Website: jonathanbreemusic.com

Jonathan Owen Bree (born 1979) is a New Zealand singer-songwriter and producer, best known for his work as a solo artist, as well as co-founding the indie pop group The Brunettes in 1998 and Lil' Chief Records, in 2002. He frequently collaborates with label-mates as a musician, engineer, and record producer.

== Early life ==
Jonathan Bree was born in New Zealand. Mark Lyons, frontman of indie pop band The Nudie Suits, was both Bree's cousin and a mentor in Bree's formative years. When Bree was ten, Lyons introduced him to Modern Lovers, with Bree becoming a long-term fan. At 12 years old, Bree first played live (and recorded) as the drummer in Lyons' band, The Plaster Saints.

== Music career ==
The Brunettes were formed in Auckland in 1998 by Bree and Heather Mansfield. According to Bree, "My cousin had recorded her band Yoko and I thought she had a great natural voice, no silly effected delivery. I was looking for a girl to sing on some duets I had written so I tracked down her number." The band independently released its first recording Mars Loves Venus EP in 1998.

In 2002, Bree founded Lil' Chief Records with fellow indie pop musician Scott Mannion of The Tokey Tones. The two men had met that year in Marbecks Record Store in Auckland, where Bree was working at the time. The Brunettes' album Holding Hands, Feeding Ducks released in 2002 was the debut release for the label. The album received a glowing review from AllMusic, as did the label's second release, The Brunettes' 2003 The Boyracer EP. Bree produced both albums. The next two albums on the label were released simultaneously in 2003 by The Tokey Tones, and Bree guested on some of the tracks.

Bree went on to release several more albums on Lil' Chief with The Brunettes. Their second album Mars Loves Venus was released in June 2004 followed by 2005's EP When Ice Met Cream. In 2004, Ryan McPhun started playing in band, who opened for The Shins 2005 tour of North America. They have also opened for Rilo Kiley, The Postal Service, Broken Social Scene, Clap Your Hands Say Yeah, and Beirut and played at the 2006 Big Day Out festivals in New Zealand and Australia.

The Brunettes' album Structure & Cosmetics was released in July 2007 in New Zealand and August in the US, on Sub Pop. Their UK profile was lifted after their track "BABY" was featured in a UK campaign in December 2007, and the release of their music video. In 2008, The Brunettes covered The Cure's "Lovesong" for American Laundromat Records tribute compilation Just Like Heaven – a tribute to The Cure.

In 2009, The Brunettes released the Red Rollerskates EP on Lil' Chief, shortly followed by Paper Dolls. In 2010, their song "Red Rollerskates" was included in soundtrack of the 2K Sports video game NBA 2K11. "Brunettes Against Bubblegum Youth" was featured on an extended advertisement for Hollyoaks in the UK.

His first work post-Brunettes was as a co-producer on the Princess Chelsea album, Lil' Golden Book. He also supplied vocals for the song, "The Cigarette Duet" and directed the accompanying music video, which subsequently went viral – reaching over 130 million views in the years that followed.

Bree's first work as a solo artist came in 2013 with the release of The Primrose Path, which was nominated for the 2014 Taite Music Prize. His next album, A Little Night Music, followed in 2015. Yet his big breakthrough came in the lead-up to his third album, when the song "You're So Cool" became a sensation on YouTube, drawing viewers with its odd depiction of a 1960s-style band whose faces were covered in spandex masks. It soon surpassed 1 million views and is currently at 42 million views as of November 2026.

2018 album Sleepwalking earned Bree his second place in the Taite Music Prize finals.

== Discography ==
=== Brunettes albums ===
- 1998: Mars Loves Venus EP
- 2002: Holding Hands, Feeding Ducks
- 2003: The Boyracer e.p.
- 2004: Mars Loves Venus
- 2005: When Ice Met Cream E.P.
- 2007: Structure & Cosmetics
- 2009: Paper Dolls
- 2009: The Red Rollerskates E.P.
- 2011: Mars Loves Venus (vinyl)

=== Compilations ===
- 2009: "Lovesong" by The Cure on Just Like Heaven – a tribute to The Cure
- 2016: "Last Night's Love" by The Reduction Agents on Waiting For Your Love – a tribute to The Reduction Agents

=== Solo releases ===
- 2013: The Primrose Path
- 2015: A Little Night Music
- 2018: Sleepwalking
- 2020: After the Curtains Close
- 2023: Pre-Code Hollywood
- 2026: Don't Call It Love

=== Collaborations ===
- 2011: co-producer on Lil Golden Book by Princess Chelsea
- 2015: co-producer on Great Cybernetic Depression by Princess Chelsea
- 2024: co-singer on You And Me with Princess Chelsea for Plankton: The Movie soundtrack

== See also ==
- Lil' Chief Records
- The Brunettes
- Princess Chelsea
- Zentai Mask
