= Lil' Golden Book =

Studio album by Princess Chelsea
- Released: May 2, 2011
- Genres: Indie pop, baroque pop
- Length: 40:43
- Label: Lil' Chief Records
- Producers: Chelsea Nikkel, Jonathan Bree

Princess Chelsea chronology
Lil' Golden Book (2011)	The Great Cybernetic Depression (2015)

Singles from Lil' Golden Book
- 1. "Monkey Eats Bananas" Released: June 2, 2009; 2. "Too Fast to Live" Released: October 11, 2011; 3. "Ice Reign" Released: April 11, 2011; 4. "The Cigarette Duet" Released: June 9, 2011; 5. "The Cigarette Duet (European Tour Edition)" Released: May 14, 2012; 6. "Overseas" Released: September 14, 2012

Lil' Golden Book is the debut studio album by the New Zealand recording artist Princess Chelsea. It was released on 2 May 2011, through Lil' Chief Records. The album was produced by Jonathan Bree and Chelsea Nikkel. The album tells the tale of life growing up as a teenager and young adult in New Zealand.

== Background ==
Nikkel stated that the album took nearly three years of production. The booklet features 15 pages designed by bandmate Brad Fafejta. The album is described as 'when cute meets creepy'.

The album was named after Little Golden Books, a series of children's books that began in the 1940s and are still being released today. She called her album "Lil' Golden Book" instead of "Little Golden Book" as an attempt to prevent herself from getting sued, but also to pay homage to her record label Lil' Chief.

== Critical reception ==
Lil' Golden Book received mostly positive reviews. The Sunday Star Times named it 'album of the week' and aptly described it as 'when cute meets creepy'. Graham Reid has called it 'mischievous and sharp' and The New Zealand Herald has likened it to "growing pains in the happiest place on earth". Louder Than War said "the quirky 'Monkey Eats Bananas' is a thumping, jungle-beat track that was a huge hit on YouTube." KittySneezes described Nikkel's vocals as "childlike tones" that "evoke the innocence necessary to make the simple lyrics work."

=== The Cigarette Duet ===
One of the most popular songs on the album is "The Cigarette Duet" featuring vocals by Jonathan Bree. The video was uploaded to YouTube in early 2011, and to date has surpassed 100 million views. This led to her being featured on The Guardian's 'New Band of the Day'.

The song is about a couple who fight over the health risks of smoking. The woman in the song is a (light) smoker, while the man is trying to encourage her to stop smoking. In the song, we learn that the man was a previous smoker, but later quit. The lyrics are often compared to Nancy & Lee with its dialogue. In an interview, she said "I sort of knew when I wrote it if any of my songs are going to get big, it’s probably this one that’s going to be successful and it has put a lot of people onto my music."

== Singles ==
- "Monkey Eats Bananas" was released on 2 June 2009 as a digital download.
- "Machines of Loving Grace" was released on 18 March 2009 as a music video featuring clips from the film The NeverEnding Story.
- "Too Fast to Live" was released on 11 October 2011 as a digital download with B-side "After the Moment", a cover of the Craft Spells song.
- "Ice Reign" was released on 11 April 2011 as a digital download.
- "The Cigarette Duet" was released on 9 June 2011 as a digital download with B-side "Positive Guy Meets Negative Man".
- "Yulia" was released on 18 February 2012 as a music video featuring her cat, Winston.
- "The Cigarette Duet (European Tour Edition)" was released on 14 May 2012 as a digital download and as a pink vinyl including the songs "The Cigarette Duet", "Positive Guy Meets Negative Man", "Goodnight Little Robot Child", and "The Cigarette Duet (Radio Edit)".
- "Overseas" was released on 14 September 2012 as a digital download with B-side "Winston Crying on the Bathroom Floor" which included clips of her cat, Winston, meowing.
- "Frack" was released on 12 December 2012 as a music video.
- "Caution Repetitive" was released on 5 April 2013 as the final music video from the Lil' Golden Book series.

== Track listing ==
All tracks written by Chelsea Nikkel; all tracks produced by Nikkel and Jonathan Bree.

No.	Title	Length
1.	"Machines of Loving Grace"	3:17
2.	"Yulia"	4:18
3.	"Ice Reign"	2:29
4.	"Monkey Eats Bananas"	3:24
5.	"Caution Repetitive"	3:27
6.	"The Cigarette Duet" (featuring Jonathan Bree)	4:20
7.	"Too Fast to Live"	2:45
8.	"Overseas"	3:07
9.	"Frack"	4:53
10.	"Goodnight Little Robot Child"	6:00
11.	"Ice Reign (Reprise)"	3:43
Total length:		40:43

== Personnel ==
Credits adapted from Lil' Golden Book album liner notes.

- Princess Chelsea - vocals (all tracks)

with guests

- Jonathan Bree - Drums, Guitar, Electric Bass, Vocals on 'Cigarette Duet'
- Mahuia Bridgman-Cooper - Violin on 'Too Fast to Live'
- Lance Smith - Harmonica on 'Too Fast to Live'
- James Milne - Vocals on 'Overseas'

Thank you

Jonathan Bree, Jamie-Lee Smith, Brad Fafejta, Scott Mannion, Gareth Shute, Lawence Mikkelsen, Esther Maake, Johnathan Hughes, Stacey Thomas, Leonardo DiCaprio, Edmund Cake, The Brunettes, Pikachunes, Golden Axe, Stevie Kaye, Joseph Harper, Andrew Tidball, The Nikkel Family, Robbie Neilson, Johanna Freeman, Richard Braitigan.
