= The Great Cybernetic Depression =

Studio album by Princess Chelsea
- Released: May 1, 2015
- Recorded: 2012–2015
- Genre: Indie pop, baroque pop, alternative
- Length: 43:17
- Label: Lil' Chief Records, Flying Nun Records
- Producer: Chelsea Nikkel, Jonathan Bree

Princess Chelsea chronology
Lil' Golden Book (2011)	The Great Cybernetic Depression (2015)	Aftertouch (2016)

Singles from The Great Cybernetic Depression
- 1. "We're So Lost" Released: November 4, 2014; 2. "No Church On Sunday" Released: November 18, 2014; 3. "Too Many People" Released: April 24, 2015

The Great Cybernetic Depression is the second studio album by the New Zealand recording artist Princess Chelsea. It was released on 1 May 2015 in New Zealand through Lil' Chief Records. The album was produced by Jonathan Bree and Chelsea Nikkel.

== Background ==
After the release of Lil' Golden Book, Chelsea Nikkel toured the album. Nikkel began work on her second album in October 2012. Nikkel announced the album title in May 2013. It was originally scheduled for a release in early 2014, but was rescheduled to May 2015 for unknown reasons.

"The Great Cybernetic Depression" is a metaphor for the anxiety and depression she was experiencing during the writing of the album.

"It's a fictional world event 10 or so years in the future (of course). It is a metaphor for the anxiety and depression I was experiencing during the writing of said album. I like channelling personal stuff through a narrative. It's easier to sing about the end of the world than how sad you are. However sometimes on the album I just straight up get emo on it – 'We Are Very Happy'. I'd like to try to be able to do that more in the future. I think it takes guts to be cheesy and emotionally direct."

- Nikkel on the album title

After the release of 'The Cigarette Duet' from Lil' Golden Book, Chelsea gained a fan base and introduced a new genre of music to people. Chelsea believes that her music has evolved since her last album in 2011, and that this album is quite different from the last.

"I'm always sort of terrified people who loved the first album will hate [this album] but you know what, Lou Reed always said make music for yourself and I like it."

== Composition ==
The Great Cybernetic Depression is a pop album with elements of indie pop, synth-pop, and electronic music. The songs were recorded over a period of three years. The opener to the album, "When the World Turns Grey", is what Chelsea describes as the "only power ballad" on the album. It is described as "dreamy" and "wispy" and her vocals are described as "low-key" and "sweet". "Is It All OK?" was described by Pitchfork as "crystalline arpeggios rolling in waves" and Chelsea and Jonathan Bree's vocals as "affectless."

"No Church on Sunday" was chosen as the second single from the album. It is an electro-pop song described as "ethereal" and the music video was described as a "nerdy acid trip". 'Too Many People' was chosen as the third single, and is described as "twinkling" and a "cosmic lullaby".

"We Are Very Happy" was described by Chelsea as "personal" and "naked emotional". She said she felt "slightly uncomfortable" about releasing the song. She said that she tried to hide the song in the packaging of the album to make it "less self-indulgent to a certain extent." "Winston Crying on the Bathroom Floor" is a song that was previously released as a B-side to the song "Overseas", released from her first album Lil' Golden Book. Chelsea has once said that she wakes up every morning "to the sound of Winston wailing in [her] bathroom," so she sampled the meowing for the song that is described by The Guardian as "a great, tiny sweat-bead of emotion."

"We're So Lost" was chosen as the lead single for the album. The song is a cover of a song by Voom from their 2006 album Hello, Are You There?. The song is described as "tinkling" and "swaying" and her vocals are described as "dreamy."

"We Are Strangers" was described as "rich" and "compelling" and Jonathan Bree's vocals as "deep and deliberate". The closing track of the album, "All the Stars", was described by The Guardian as "beautiful and dreary."

The Guardian said that the standout tracks are "We're So Lost" and "Winston Crying on the Bathroom Floor", and Pitchfork said that "Too Many People" is a standout track. Other critics have said that "No Church on Sunday", "We Were Meant 2 B", "When the World Turns Grey", and "We Are Strangers" are standout tracks.

== Singles ==
- "We're So Lost" was released 4 November 2014 on vinyl, and digital download. The music video was released on 28 November 2014 and was directed by Simon Ward with special effects by Luke Rowell, Kenny Smith and Simon Ward. The single was released with B-side 'When The World Turns Grey,' which later made an appearance on the album.
- "No Church on Sunday" was released on 18 November 2014 as a digital download with B-side 'Digital Dream Girl.' The music video was released on 2 December 2014 and was directed by Simon Ward with special effects by Simon Ward and Kenny Smith.
- "Too Many People" was released on 24 April 2014 on SoundCloud for streaming. The music video was released on 28 May 2014 and was directed by Simon Ward.

== Track listing ==
All tracks written by Chelsea Nikkel, except where noted; all tracks produced by Nikkel and Jonathan Bree.

No.	Title	Length
1.	"When the World Turns Grey"	4:14
2.	"Is It All Ok?" (featuring Joe Astle)	4:05
3.	"No Church on Sunday" (writer: Jamie-Lee Smith)	4:58
4.	"Too Many People" (featuring Jonathan Bree)	5:02
5.	"We Are Very Happy"	4:56
6.	"We Were Meant 2 B"	4:45
7.	"Winston Crying on the Bathroom Floor" (featuring Winston, Princess Chelsea's cat)	2:05
8.	"We Are Strangers" (featuring Jonathan Bree)	4:51
9.	"We're So Lost" (writer: Buzz Moller)	3:49
10.	"All the Stars"	4:32
Total length:		43:17

Notes

- All collaborations are uncredited.

== Release history ==
Region	Date	Format	Label	Ref.
New Zealand	1 May 2015	LP; digital download	Lil' Chief; Flying Nun	
Europe	18 May 2015	LP; digital download	Lil' Chief; Flying Nun	
United States	8 June 2015	LP; digital download	Lil' Chief; Flying Nun	
United Kingdom	8 June 2015	LP; digital download	Lil' Chief; Flying Nun	
