= Downtown Puff =

Studio album by Edmund Cake
- Released: 3 June 2004
- Genre: Indie pop
- Length: 36:39
- Label: Lil' Chief Records
- Producer: Edmund Cake

Lil' Chief Records chronology
Songbook (2004)	Downtown Puff (2004)	Mars Loves Venus (2004)

Downtown Puff is a solo album by Edmund Cake. Although multi-instrumentalist Cake played various instruments and performed vocals on the album, other musicians and singers on the album include Anna Coddington, Neil Finn and Tim Finn. Geoff Maddock and Joel Wilton of Cake's short-lived earlier band and Flying Nun phenomenon Bressa Creeting Cake, now of Goldenhorse, also appear on the album.

McWilliams wrote and recorded many of the songs on the album in a studio on Gore Street - a red-light area in Auckland. According to a biography of Cake, the album was influenced by this environment, including "incessant street brawls, strip club pop, and Doobie Brothers hits played by the covers band in the 24-hour bar downstairs." The album includes instrumental tracks such as "Airshow" and "You're Watching Me", and vocal tracks such as "Secret Girl" described by McWilliams as a comedy song that 'came out serious'.

== Reception ==
Professional ratings
Review scores
Source	Rating
The New Zealand Herald	4/5 stars

The album was included in the 'best of 2005' list by The Clientele for Pitchfork Magazine. It was also included in the 2010 list of 'the best NZ albums I've ever reviewed' by Simon Sweetman. Cake was nominated for 'Best Producer' for his work on the album at the 2005 bNet New Zealand Music Awards.

== Track listing ==
1. "Secret Girl" – 3:16
2. "We Live Like Kings" – 2:11
3. "Golden Man" – 4:51
4. "Gunga" – 3:27
5. "My Son The Harpist" – 4:39
6. "You're Watching Me" – 3:10
7. "The Airshow" – 5:08
8. "Silverdale" – 4:16
9. "Beautiful Sleep" – 2:33
10. "Oh Baby Bear" – 3:08
