= Boycrush =

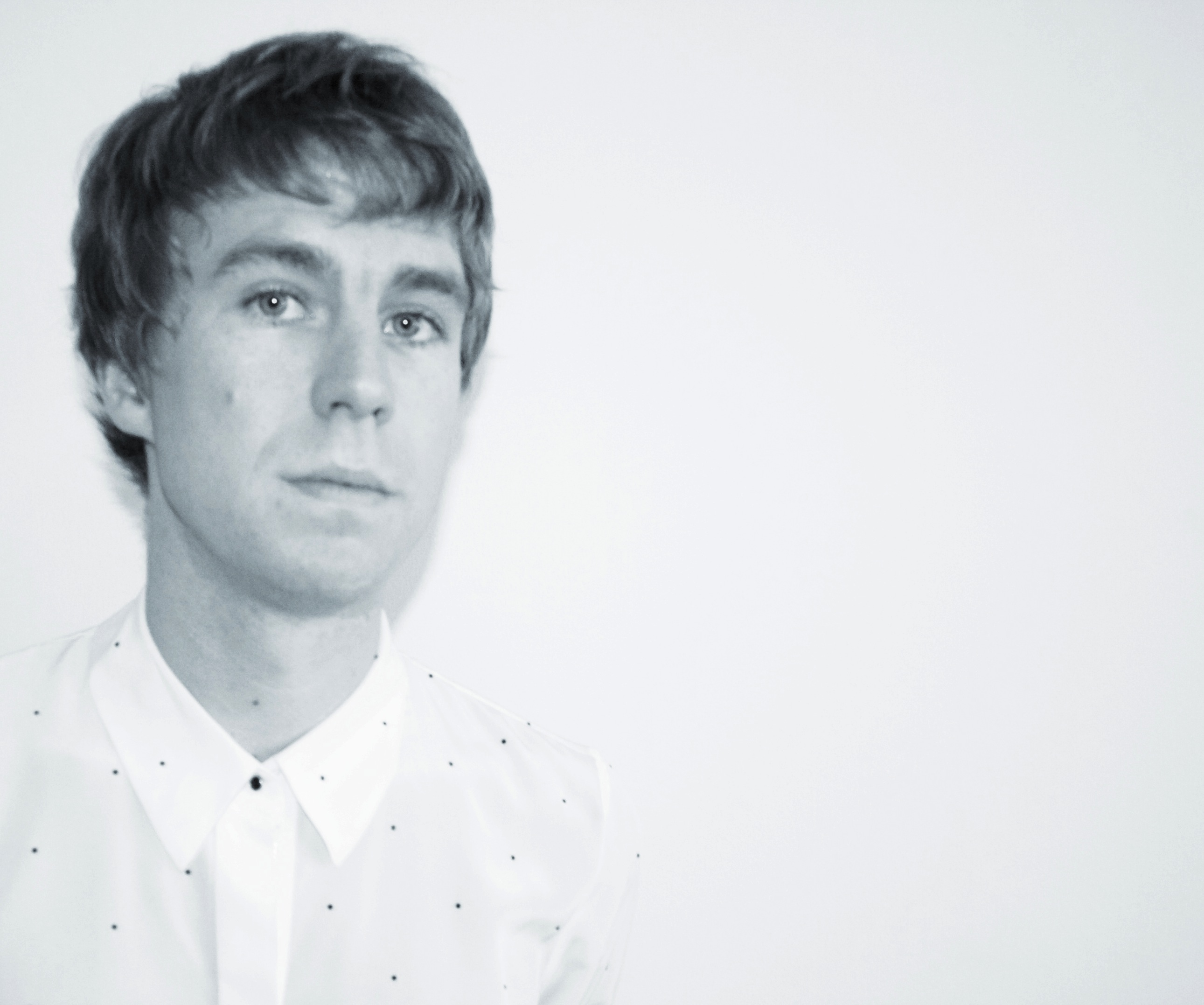

Background information
- Born: Sydney, Australia
- Genres: Indie Pop, Electronic
- Occupations: Producer, songwriter, instrumentalist
- Instruments: Drums, keyboards, vocals
- Years active: 2011–present
- Website: boycrushmusic.com

Boycrush is the alias of New Zealand recording artist, producer and session drummer Alistair Ross Deverick signed to Angry Mob Music publishing in Los Angeles, California.

== Solo career ==
His first release was Everybody All The Time EP in 2012, which grew out of time spent at the Red Bull Music Academy in Madrid in 2011.

In 2013 he opened for Lorde at her second ever NZ show at Galatos basement in Auckland.

His second release, EP Girls On Top (2014) premiered on the Guardian with the lead single Flirt featuring on multiple music publications and being commissioned for use in the Hollywood film Bad Moms.

The same EP earned him a nomination for the Critic's Choice prize at the 2015 New Zealand Music Awards.

In 2018 he released his debut album Desperate Late Night Energy which earned him a nomination for Best Electronic Artist at the 2018 New Zealand Music Awards.

== Drumming career ==
In 2010 he joined Sub Pop band The Ruby Suns and toured the United States and Europe in support of Fight Softly and in 2013 he played on and toured Christopher.

In 2014 he played drums with Neil Finn on the ‘Dizzy Heights’ tour throughout Australia, Europe and the United States.

He recorded drums for Lawrence Arabia’s 2016 album Absolute Truth recorded with Mike Fabulous in Petone, Wellington. He also recorded drums for Lawrence Arabia's 2018 album Singles Club.

== Solo discography ==
=== Compilation ===
- Various Assets Not For Sale (RBMA, 2011)

=== Albums ===
- Desperate Late Night Energy, 2018 (self-released)

=== EPs ===
- Everybody All The Time EP, 2012 (self-released)
- Girls On Top EP, 2014 (self-released)

=== Singles ===
- PFFT / In a Former Life I Worshipped The Sun split 7-inch with Grayson Gilmour (Red Bull Music Academy)
- Secrets / Soft Teeth split 7-inch with Watercolours (self-released)

=== Remixes ===
- "In Real Life", The Ruby Suns (Sub Pop)
- "Giving Up On The Summer", Introverted Dancefloor (Carpark)
