= Princess Chelsea =

New Zealander musician (born 1985)

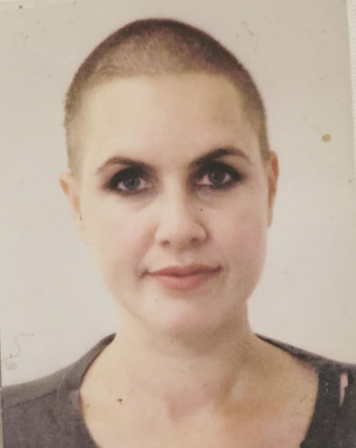
- Princess Chelsea, 2018

Background information
- Born: Chelsea Lee Nikkel; 4 September 1985 (age 40); Auckland, New Zealand
- Genres: Indie pop, synth-pop, baroque pop
- Years active: 2009–present
- Label: Lil' Chief Records
- Website: princesschelsea.lilchiefrecords.com

Chelsea Lee Nikkel (born September 4, 1985), better known by her stage name Princess Chelsea, is a New Zealand producer, musician and visual artist. She was a member of twee pop band the Brunettes and cult Auckland band Teenwolf. Chelsea has released four albums of original material and one covers album. Nikkel is associated with the Lil' Chief Records collective and is a part-time member of Disciples of Macca, a Paul McCartney covers band featuring members of the Brunettes, Ruby Suns, Bressa Creeting Cake and Lawrence Arabia, and more recently performs as a bass player in the three-piece rock'n'roll band Hang Loose.

== Music career ==
Chelsea's baroque musical style has been attributed to her classical training, and the New Zealand Herald has praised her "angelic vocals and acerbic wit". Her best known song, "The Cigarette Duet", received significant press exposure after its video went viral on YouTube in early 2012, recently reaching over 100 million views. This led to her being featured on The Guardian's "New Band of the Day". Chelsea is also known for her distinctive and influential visual style, which emerged with her creation of homemade low-budget music videos beginning in 2011. Chelsea cites Andy Warhol and director Robert Altman as influencing her visual style and more recently has begun making visual content for other artists directing and editing music videos for In The Sunshine and Politics by Jonathan Bree. The self-directed music video for "I Love My Boyfriend" is an example of her signature visual style, which often incorporates mixed multimedia and VHS with an editing style that favours long voyeuristic shots as depicted in early music videos for "Yulia", "Ice Reign" and most famously "The Cigarette Duet".

For the music videos from her second album, The Great Cybernetic Depression, Chelsea began working exclusively with New Zealand–based video artist Simon Ward, who directed the web series Aroha Bridge with Jessica Hansell and collaborates with New York–based New Zealand contemporary artist Jess Johnson. Simon Ward directed the music videos for "Is It All Ok?", "We're So Lost", "We Are Strangers", "We Were Meant 2 B" and "No Church on Sunday". Simon Ward also directed the music videos for "Frack" and "Caution Repetitive" from her first album Lil' Golden Book. Chelsea's song "When The World Turns Grey" from The Great Cybernetic Depression was remixed in a collaboration with the German electronic music producer Robin Schulz. The remix is on the album Sugar released by Schulz in September 2015.

In August 2016, Chelsea released a cover of the song "Cold Glass Tube" by the Reduction Agents, which is available on the album Waiting for Your Love: A Tribute to the Reduction Agents. This was followed up by an album of covers called Aftertouch, which features her signature dreamy electronic productions of songs by a variety of artists, including Lucinda Williams, Elvis Presley, Interpol and Nirvana.

In May 2018, Princess Chelsea released the album The Loneliest Girl, which features the runaway hit "I Love My Boyfriend".

In 2019, Chelsea moved to Waiheke Island in New Zealand and took a self-imposed hiatus from music after experiencing a mental-health collapse.

In 2022, Princess Chelsea collaborated with French electronic artist Mattyeux from the project Videoclub on the duet "Sometimes" released on Warner Chappell France.

In March 2023, Princess Chelsea collaborated with Jonathan Bree and Nile Rodgers on the duet "Miss You".

In April 2023, Princess Chelsea won the Taite Music Prize for her fifth album, Everything is Going to be Alright, which chronicles her recovery from a two-year-long mental-health crisis.

On March 6, 2024, Teenwolf reunited for a one-off gig supporting Shonen Knife on Waiheke Island.

In 2025, Chelsea performed the song "You and Me" with Jonathan Bree for the soundtrack to the Netflix film Plankton: The Movie.

== Discography ==
=== Albums ===
- Lil' Golden Book (2011)
- The Great Cybernetic Depression (2015)
- Aftertouch (2016)
- The Loneliest Girl (2018)
- Everything Is Going to Be Alright (2022)

=== EPs ===
- The Cigarette Duet (European Tour Edition) (2012)

=== Singles ===
Title	Year	Album
"Your Woman"	2009	Non-album single
"Monkey Eats Bananas"	2009	Lil' Golden Book
"And I Love Her"	2010	Non-album single
"Too Fast to Live"	2011	Lil' Golden Book
"The Cigarette Duet"	2011	Lil' Golden Book
"Ice Reign"	2011	Lil' Golden Book
"Overseas"	2012	Lil' Golden Book
"We're So Lost"	2013	The Great Cybernetic Depression
"No Church on Sunday"	2014	The Great Cybernetic Depression
"Kiss My Lips"	2020	Collaboration with Jonathan Bree on After The Curtains Close

=== Music videos ===
Year	Music video	Artist(s)	Album	Date	Notes
2009	"Monkey Eats Bananas"	Princess Chelsea	Lil' Golden Book	9 March	Chelsea dancing and performing in front of a green screen with the stuffed monkey used on the single cover. In the background, random footage is played, such as a clip of Bill O'Reilly's television meltdown, the movie poster for License to Drive, and goldfish underwater.
2009	"Machines of Loving Grace"	Princess Chelsea	Lil' Golden Book	18 March	The music video is entirely clips from the movie The NeverEnding Story
2009	"Red Rollerskates"	The Brunettes	-	11 November	Makes a cameo as a jogger in the park
2010	"And I Love Her"	Princess Chelsea	Aftertouch	17 April	
2011	"Ice Reign"	Princess Chelsea	Lil' Golden Book	4 April	The video is entirely Chelsea in front of a computer screen, occasionally sipping on a Diet Coke, with her stuffed monkey behind her.
2011	"The Cigarette Duet"	Princess Chelsea & Jonathan Bree	Lil' Golden Book	7 June	The video is Chelsea and Bree in a hot tub, singing with bored expressions on their faces. The video is her most popular, reaching over 100 million views on YouTube.
2011	"Too Fast to Live"	Princess Chelsea	Lil' Golden Book	10 October	Scenes of a house party that appear to be filmed by a tape recorder. Chelsea does not appear in the video until the last scene, when the director's fingers awaken her. She ends the video by flipping the camera off.
2012	"Yulia"	Princess Chelsea	Lil' Golden Book	18 February	Chelsea and her cat, Winston, in front of a yellow background.
2012	"Overseas"	Princess Chelsea (feat. James Milne)	Lil' Golden Book	13 September	Chelsea in Central Square.
2012	"Frack"	Princess Chelsea	Lil' Golden Book	12 December	CGI animation of Chelsea in the future getting ready for her day. Her cat Winston makes a cameo in the video.
2013	"Caution Repetitive"	Princess Chelsea	Lil' Golden Book	5 April	Chelsea trying on costumes. The video is the last of the Lil' Golden Book series.
2013	"We're So Lost"	Princess Chelsea	The Great Cybernetic Depression	29 October	CGI animation of Chelsea parodying The Sims.
2013	"The Primrose Path"	Jonathan Bree	-	18 December	A music video of Jonathan Bree's full album, The Primrose Path, featuring him in bed with Chelsea and her cat, Winston. The video is referred to as an "anti music video."
2014	"No Church on Sunday"	Princess Chelsea	The Great Cybernetic Depression	2 December	Chelsea standing in a CGI world in a gothic outfit.
2015	"Too Many People"	Princess Chelsea	The Great Cybernetic Depression	28 May	Chelsea singing in a karaoke style in a black room with fog. Her cat Winston makes a cameo in the video.
2015	"We Were Meant 2 B"	Princess Chelsea	The Great Cybernetic Depression	19 August	Directed by Simon Ward.
2015	"We Are Strangers"	Princess Chelsea & Jonathan Bree	The Great Cybernetic Depression	30 October	Directed by Simon Ward.
2016	"Is It All OK?"	Princess Chelsea	The Great Cybernetic Depression	13 May	A CGI music video featuring robotic acting avatars of Chelsea and Joe Astle.
2016	"Morning Sun"	Princess Chelsea	Aftertouch	26 September	A cover of Marianne Faithfull's 1965 song.
2016	"Aftertouch"	Princess Chelsea	Aftertouch	15 November	
2018	"I Love My Boyfriend"	Princess Chelsea	The Loneliest Girl	21 June	Directed by Chelsea Nikkel
2018	"Wasting Time"	Princess Chelsea	The Loneliest Girl	3 August	Video shot directed and edited by Anastasia Doniants on Super 8 film.
2018	"Growing Older"	Princess Chelsea	The Loneliest Girl	3 October	Video edited by Chelsea Nikkel from handycam footage 1990–2002.
2020	"Kiss My Lips"	Jonathan Bree	-	13 February	Chelsea performing on a 1960s-style stage with a backing band wearing masks.
2020	"All I Need to Do"	Princess Chelsea	The Loneliest Girl	21 May	Edited by Chelsea Nikkel.
2020	"I Miss My Man"	Princess Chelsea	The Loneliest Girl	23 November	
2022	"Everything Is Going to Be Alright"	Princess Chelsea	Everything Is Going to Be Alright	25 February	
2022	"Sometimes"	Princess Chelsea, Mattyeux	-	24 June	Princess Chelsea's first collaboration song with Mattyeux
2022	"The Forest"	Princess Chelsea	Everything Is Going to Be Alright	2 August	
2022	"Forever Is a Charm"	Princess Chelsea	Everything Is Going to Be Alright	8 September	
2023	"Time"	Princess Chelsea	Everything Is Going to Be Alright	18 January	
2023	"We Kick Around"	Princess Chelsea	Everything Is Going to Be Alright	22 November	
2024	"Everything Is Going To Be Alright (Pt. 2)"	Princess Chelsea	Everything Is Going to Be Alright	25 May	
