= Sheep, Dog and Wolf =

Sheep, Dog and Wolf may refer to:

- Sheep, Dog 'n' Wolf, 2001 video game based on Looney Tunes
- Sheep, Dog & Wolf (21st century), New Zealand musician

== See also ==
- Herding dog
- Livestock guardian dog
