= Pikachunes =

- Also known as: Miles G. Loveless
- Born: Miles McDougall; Christchurch, New Zealand
- Genres: Sad Pop, Electronica, House
- Occupations: Musician, producer
- Instruments: Various (drum machine, drums, etc.)
- Years active: 2009-present
- Labels: Monday Records; Lil' Chief Records; WHY Records
- Website: Pikachunes.com

Pikachunes is the sad pop musical project of Miles McDougall (i.e. Miles G. Loveless), a songwriter, musician and producer based in Melbourne. Trained in jazz, for McDougall "a typical track features one or two synths, a '70s analog bass line, and a series of reverberated vocal harmonies, all driven by an atypical disco beat."

== Early life, education ==
Miles McDougall was born and raised in Christchurch, New Zealand. He grew up listening intently to musicians such as the Pet Shop Boys, Eurythmics, B52′s and Matt Bianco, and as an adult listens to most releases from DFA Records and Kitsuné. He studied classical music in his youth, and after graduating high school, studied at the CPIT, Jazz School; majoring in performance on drum kit.

=== Founding ===
McDougall founded Pikachunes as a solo project in 2009, after a skateboarding incident left him with plates and pins in his arm. At the time he was studying Jazz Performance on drums and working towards a Bachelor of Music. While his arm healed McDougall turned to digital composition and production to keep himself occupied. According to McDougall, "The name came to me whilst I was in hospital under heavy amounts of morphine for pain. As cliche as it sounds I woke up with the name in my head and it stuck." In August 2015 McDougall signed with Sydney record label, Monday Records.

=== Releases ===
After finishing a national tour in 2009 with O'Lovely and Tiger Tones, Pikachunes released his debut EP in 2010.

His first LP, Pikachunes, was released on Lil' Chief Records in September 2011. The songwriting process took six months, with McDougall building the songs first out of the rhythm section. The single from the album, "Nervous," was dubbed an "addictive Pet Shop Boys-esque lead single." He released music videos for the tracks "Shout It Out” and “Just a Boy.”

He went on to perform live in New Zealand, Australia, The East Coast of the United States, and has made multiple tours of Europe, often sharing shows with labelmate Princess Chelsea. He has played alongside groups like Star Slinger,Gold Panda, Bachelorette and Casiotone For The Painfully Alone.

In February 2013 he released the EP Miles on Lil' Chief. It features his remix of the Kids of 88 track "Tucan," and guest appearances by Boycrush and Zowie, the latter providing vocals for the single "Cinnamon Pop Dream." The album was mastered by Dejisan Suskov at Revolver Studios.

In April 2016, Miles released a new single and animated video for You / Are, premiered through Australian music magazine, Happy Mag.

=== Style ===
About his sound, "a typical track features one or two synths, a '70s analog bass line, and a series of reverberated vocal harmonies, all driven by an atypical disco beat." He performs onstage with only a drum machine, a laptop, and a microphone, though in the latter of 2012 he claimed to be putting together a band for live performances.

== Discography ==
=== Albums ===
- Pikachunes (2011, Lil' Chief Records)
- Miles EP (2013, Lil' Chief Records)
- Allely (2015, Noisey)

=== Singles ===
- "Nervous" (2011)
- "Just A Boy" (2011)
- "Cinnamon Pop Dream" (2013)
- "PIOY" (2015)
- "You Are" (2016)
