= Mars Loves Venus EP =

EP by the Brunettes
- Released: 1998
- Genre: Indie pop
- Producer: Jonathan Bree

The Brunettes chronology
Mars Loves Venus EP (1998)	Holding Hands, Feeding Ducks (2002)

Mars Loves Venus EP is the debut release by the Brunettes. It was self-released in 1998, on lathe-cut clear vinyl manufactured by King Records in Geraldine, New Zealand. Only 30 copies are believed to be in existence, and the EP is highly sought after by collectors. The version of the title track is different from the one which appears on the Mars Loves Venus album.

== Track listing ==
1. "Mars Loves Venus"
2. "Long Distance Love"
3. "He's a Teenwolf"
4. "Lookout for the Shutterbug"

== Personnel ==
- Jonathan Bree — vocals, guitar
- Heather Mansfield — vocals, keyboards
- Marcus Sellwood — bass
- Andy Baxter — drums
