= The Axemen =

New Zealand indie rock band

The AXEMEN
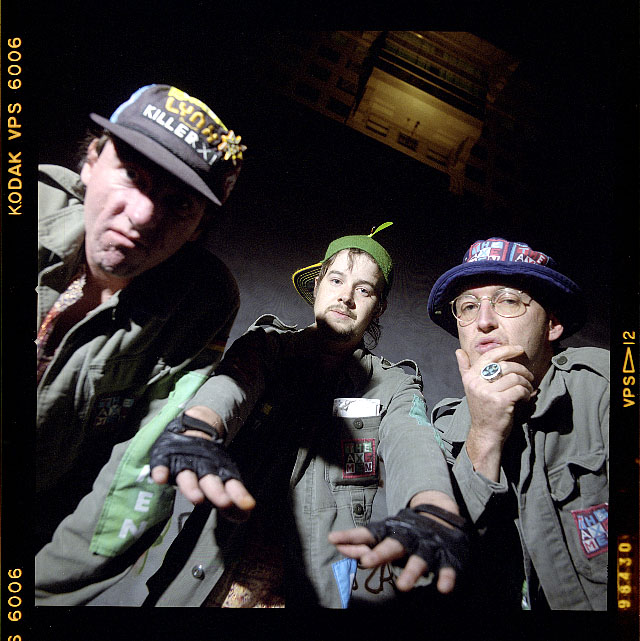
- The AXEMEN

Background information
- Origin: Christchurch and South Dunedin, New Zealand
- Genres: Indie rock, rock, punk rock
- Years active: 1983–present
- Labels: Sleek Bott, Flying Nun, Siltbreeze
- Members: Bob Brannigan; Steve McCabe; Stu Kawowski
- Past members: Dragan Stojanonovic; Johnny Segovia; George D. Henderson; Mick Elborado

The Axemen is a New Zealand indie rock band formed in 1983. They played at the protests for homosexual law reform in 1983, where member Little Stevie McCabe was severely beaten up in the Christchurch Cathedral Square toilets.

The Axemen's founding members, Bob Brannigan, Little Stevie McCabe, and Stu Kawowski, had been members of various bands in the South Island cities of Christchurch and Dunedin. Brannigan and McCabe played together in Christchurch under many names including The Whining Plums, Hey, We're Wolves and The Twins in the early 1980s. Kawowski played in a two-piece band at Cashmere High School called The Gorillas with Peter Rees, a classical guitarist. Kawowski joined the band The Twins at the Empire Tavern in Dunedin in 1983, when he jumped on stage to play the drums.

In February 2009, US record label Siltbreeze re-released the Axemen's 1984 protest album Big Cheap Motel on 12-inch vinyl. Originally the album was released as a cassette packaged in a small bubble sleeve with a straw, mimicking the milk drink Big M. Big Cheap Motel included a recording of a live performance at the Summer Times festival in January 1984, a public music stage set up in Hagley Park, Christchurch. The band observed sexism in the Big M advertising surrounding the main stage, and subsequently wrote protest songs targeting the Christchurch City Council.

The Axemen toured the United States for five weeks in October and November 2009, opening for Times New Viking playing 26 shows including Sacramento (27 October), New York and Chicago (28 November).

The Axemen's debut double LP Three Virgins :: Three Versions:: Three Visions was re-issued and released on 7 June 2011 by Siltbreeze. This album was originally released on New Zealand label Flying Nun Records in 1985. A mint copy of the 1985 vinyl was transferred to digital files at Shadoks Music Studio, Amrum, Germany.

The Axemen featuring McCabe, Kawowski, Stojanovic and newcomer William Daymond toured Australia in December 2011. William Daymond played bass guitar, allowing Dragan Stojanovic to play lead guitar. The Axemen played 10 shows starting in Brisbane and ending in Adelaide on 23 December.

The Axemen recorded a new vinyl album Sac Tap Nut Jam in Wellington in 2013, which was released through Spacecase Records, California.

2014 saw the re-release of 1989's Derry Legend on vinyl by Luxury Products USA.

== Members ==
- Little Stevie McCabe – songwriter / singer / guitarist / keyboardist / vocalist / percussionist / bassist / recording technician
- Bob Brannigan AKA Robert Cardy – songwriter / singer / guitarist / keyboardist / vocalist / percussionist / bassist / music teacher / librarian
- Stu Kawowski AKA Stuart Page – drummer / percussionist / photographer / screenprinter / promotions, hustling for gigs, award-winning documentary film maker
- Johnny Segovia AKA Rent Hamilton – seminal Christchurch session musician and member of just about every band in Christchurch at the time including The Axel Grinders and The Connoisseurs
- Doug Hamilton – songwriter and member of The Connoisseurs
- 'Shorty' Hamilton – bass player, The Axel Grinders and The Connoisseurs
- Patrick Faigin – songwriter and drummer, Say Yes To Apes, The Axel Grinders
- M. S. Agro AKA Mick Elborado – taxman, bass player for almost every original rock band in Christchurch including The Renderers, Ritchie Venus and the Blue Beetles, Scorched Earth Policy, The Terminals, Shadow of the Valley.
- Gordon Baird – fruitarian, square jawed bass player, formerly of White Noize, legendary radical Dunedin vegan band, animal rights activists and motorcycle enthusiasts where he played with brother Martin
- B.B. Ryan – guitarist of White Noize
- Gary Scott – session horn player
- Arthur Sheep – sax appeal
- Al Wright – sax appeal
- Peter Hall-Jones – communist, writer, trumpet-player
- Joanne Billesdon – bassist of The Thunderbirds, Demolition, Loliners
- Sharon Billesdon – Loliners
- Bev E. Rage – guitarist and singer, The Thunderbirds
- Screamin K Hawkins – guitarist, of Shoes This High
- Jessica Walker – violist, Shoes This High
- Lisa Preston – keyboards, backing vocals Nux Vomica, Loliners
- Angela Dawson – vocalist, Scab Union
- Reta le Quesne – vocalist, Axel Grinders, The Wrongdoings
- Haydn Jones – drummer, The Renderers
- Dragan Stojanovic – Guitarist, backing vocals Vas Deferens
- Lissa Bruce – Singer, keyboardist, muse
- George D. Henderson – Keyboards and backing vocals And Band, The Puddle
- Chris Knox – The Enemy, Toy Love, Tall Dwarfs
- Peter Gutteridge – Keyboards, of The Clean, Snapper
- Richard (Dick's Riff) Cotton of EOE
- Billy Naylor of EOE
- Elron Hubbard AKA Zeberdee Holdall of Nux Vomica, also The National Sex Grid
- Brent Hayward – Dancer, vocalist of Shoes This High
- Davey G – Dancer, of Gestalt, The Rainy Days, Marty Sauce and the Source, EOE
- Gaylene – percussion, of Gaylene and the Undertakers
- Rich Mixture – Drums, supplementary guitar, bass, of Gestalt, The Rainy Days, Marty Sauce and the Source, The D4
- Larence Shustak(1926–2003) – recording engineer 3 Virgins, School of Fine Arts (Univ of Canty) Photography professor, musicologist, Stu's muse, subject of Stu's multi-award-winning documentary 'Shustak'
- Nick Roughan – recording engineer, producer Derry Legend, The Skeptics
- Jed Town – producer, 3 Virgins, Peter Wang Pud, Fetus Productions, JedEye, The Invisible Man, Ghost Town, ICU, Sawtooth Recordings, The Features
- Z. Bob – producer, recording engineer of Frisbee Records
- Matt Middleton – Sax, Keyboards, The Aesthetics
- Russel Covini – Drums, Loliners, the Aesthetics
- William Daymond – Bass, Guitar, keyboard, drums, other duties as required under employment contracts act Terror of the Deep, The Pickups, Green Eyed Owl

Brannigan currently plays in Shaft, the band he formed with Kawowski, Johnny Segovia and Danny Mañeto in Auckland 1992. (Kawowski, Segovia and Mañeto are no longer in the lineup, which is ever-changing but is currently made up of members of The Situations).
