= Herriot Row =

- Also known as: Simon Comber
- Born: New Zealand
- Genres: Indie, folk
- Occupations: Musician, composer
- Instruments: Guitar, vocals
- Years active: 2000–present
- Website: herriotrow.com

Herriot Row is the musical moniker of New Zealand songwriter Simon Comber who has also recorded and performed under his own name. The moniker references the street Heriot Row in Dunedin, which in turn references Heriot Row in Dunedin's counterpart, Edinburgh in Scotland.

Comber performs both solo and with an Auckland-based band as Herriot Row. The band features musicians Stuart Harwood (drums) and David Flyger (bass). Comber's music mixes alternate guitar tunings, folk rock arrangements, analogue production techniques, psychedelic melodic strains, and a narrative lyrical focus. Influences include John Fahey, Neutral Milk Hotel, Television, Townes Van Zandt, Sonic Youth, Peter Jefferies, and Joni Mitchell. He has collaborated with acclaimed artists such as John Vanderslice, Edmund McWilliams, and Graeme Downes, and performed in New Zealand, Australia and America.

== History ==
Comber began performing under his own name in the late nineties in Auckland before moving to Dunedin to study music in 2002. Regular performances in Dunedin led to his first national tour opening for The Chills in 2004.

After being spotted by founding Split Enz member Mike Chunn and Crowded House frontman Neil Finn at a Sacred Heart College fundraiser show in Auckland, Comber ended up recording most of the material for his debut album Pre-Pill Love at Finn's Roundhead Studios with producer Edmund McWilliams, former singer for the band Bressa Creeting Cake. A further three songs were recorded at Albany Street Studios in Dunedin, and featured contributions from members of The Verlaines Graeme Downes and Darren Stedman. Downes, a lecturer at University of Otago where Comber studied, contributed a trumpet arrangement to one track, and Stedman drummed on two tracks. The Sunday Star-Times compared Comber's songwriting to Judee Sill and Don McGlashan.

A second album Endearance was recorded at the masonic lodge in Port Chalmers by Dale Cotton and released in 2010. The increased presence of electric guitars and alternate tunings on the album brought comparisons by Graham Reid to John Martyn and The Clean, whilst Comber's poetic narrative lyrics drew comparisons to Bill Callahan, Joni Mitchell and Bill Direen. In 2010 Comber supported The Verlaines touring throughout New Zealand. It would be the first of two tours with The Verlaines, with Comber also accompanying them on tour throughout Australia in 2012.

The E.P The Right To Talk to Strangers was released in 2011. Promotional shows included Comber's first tour of the United States, with shows supporting indie rock singer-songwriter Barbara Manning in San Francisco, Arcata, Eureka and Philadelphia. This 5 track E.P was co-produced by Auckland-based, New Zealand Music Awards nominated producer Thomas Healy, who has also produced albums by Tiny Ruins and Popstrangers.

Comber began performing as Herriot Row in 2013. The debut Herriot Row album Lesser Stars was produced and engineered by John Vanderslice at Tiny Telephone Studios in San Francisco in July 2014. Vanderslice is known for his "sloppy hi-fi" recording aesthetic, and his production work with the Mountain Goats, Spoon, and Samantha Crain. In September 2014 Radio New Zealand National broadcast an audio diary on the collaboration between Comber and Vanderslice. Lesser Stars was released on September 1, 2017. New Zealand rock critic Nick Bollinger praised the album, calling it "a new peak in Comber's singer-songwriting."

== Writing ==
Comber has written about the music of Peter Jefferies for Real Groove. He has written about the non-fiction prose works of Martin Edmond for The Pantograph Punch. Comber's interview with him was included in the e-book edition of Edmond's memoir, Barefoot Years.

== Discography ==
- Pre-Pill Love (2006) (released as Simon Comber)
- Endearance (2010) (released as Simon Comber)
- The Right To Talk To Strangers (2011) (released as Simon Comber)
- Learning Not To Talk (2016)
- Lesser Stars (2017)
