= Shaft (New Zealand band) =

- Origin: New Zealand
- Genres: Rock and roll Indie
- Years active: 1992–present
- Label: Lil' Chief Records

Shaft is the long-standing vehicle of songwriter Robert Cardy (aka Bob Brannigan), original guitarist for the band The Axemen and a stalwart of the New Zealand underground scene. When the Axemen took a break in 1992, Cardy was jamming with Axemen drummer Stu Kawowski (Stuart Page) for a while, and one day bumped into guitarist John Segovia (of Axel Grinders) at a gas station. Soon after Daniel "Speedy" Mañetto came on board as bass player. This original line-up stayed together for around a year or two, and then one by one Segovia, Mañetto and Kawowski departed. Cardy then put together a more hard-edged version of Shaft with a shifting roster that contained Tony Rush, Rich Mixture, Mark Petersen, Cameron Rowe, and Matt Brown. Since that time the lineup has changed considerably, with many members coming and going. The current lineup includes Cardy as well as all members of The Situations: Glen Casey (keys), Brad Walkington (guitar), Samuel Kett (bass) and Stuart Kett (drums).

== Discography ==
=== Albums ===
Date	Title	Label	Catalog number	Type
1996	Pooty	Zero	Zero 0007	EP
1996	I Just Wanna Have Your Baby	Zero	Zero 0010	EP
1999	Cheap Candy	Action!		EP
2004	Open Sesame	Lil' Chief Records	LCR 008	Album
2006	Down at Your Life	Lil' Chief Records	LCR 018	Album

=== Featured compilations ===
Shaft have appeared on several compilations in New Zealand. The following is a list of these albums that have featured tracks by Shaft.

- (1996) – But I Can Write Songs Okay (Yellow Eye Records) (EYE005-007) – "The Downhill Racer"
- (2003) – Get A Haircut: 31 of the best New Zealand Rock 'n' Rollers ever! (Zerox) (DZEROX03) – "Playing With Our Selves"
- (2007) – Greetings From New Zealand (a label sampler) Lil' Chief Records (none) – "Pacific Ocean" and "Can You Feel It (Parts I & II)"
- (2012) – These Shaky Isles (a Lil' Chief Records Mixtape) Lil' Chief Records (none) – "Pacific Ocean"
