= Structure & Cosmetics =

Studio album by The Brunettes
- Released: 30 July 2007 (NZ); August 7, 2007 (US)
- Genre: Indie pop
- Length: 38:48
- Labels: Lil' Chief Records; Sub Pop
- Producer: Jonathan Bree

The Brunettes chronology
When Ice Met Cream (2005)	Structure & Cosmetics (2007)	Paper Dolls (2009)

Professional ratings
Review scores
Source	Rating
AllMusic	link
CMJ	favorable
Crawdaddy	favorable
NME	8/10
Pitchfork Media	7.3/10 link
The Sunday Star-Times	link

Structure & Cosmetics is the third album by New Zealand band The Brunettes, and their first album to be released on Sub Pop in the US. The album was released on 30 July 2007 in New Zealand on Lil' Chief Records and on August 7, 2007, in North America.

== Track listing ==
1. "Brunettes Against Bubblegum Youth (B-A-B-Y)" - 4:15
2. "Stereo (Mono Mono)" - 5:03
3. "Her Hairagami Set" - 4:39
4. "Credit Card Mail Order" - 4:11
5. "Obligatory Road Song" - 4:12
6. "Small Town Crew" - 3:52
7. "If You Were Alien" - 4:28
8. "Wall Poster Star" - 3:34
9. "Structure & Cosmetics" - 4:34

== Personnel ==
- Heather Mansfield - vocals, organ, piano, clarinet, melodica, glockenspiel, harmonica
- Jonathan Bree - vocals, guitars, bass, synthesizers, drums, Rhodes, mellotron
- James Milne - backing vocals and bass on tracks 1, 3, 4, 7 and 9
- Ryan McPhun - backing vocals and drums on tracks 1, 3, 4, 7 and 9
- Harry Cundy - trumpet
- Jamie Power - drums on tracks 6 and 8
- William Cotton - backing vocals, tenor saxophone, celeste
- Dionne Taylor - lap steel
