= Sweetacres =

Studio album by The Nudie Suits
- Released: 17 February 2006
- Genre: Indie pop
- Length: 31:18
- Label: Lil' Chief Records
- Producer: Mark Lyons

The Nudie Suits chronology
Songbook (2003)	Sweetacres (2006)

Sweetacres is the second album from Auckland band The Nudie Suits. It was recorded between 2004 and 2005 in Melbourne, Australia, and in Auckland.

== Track listing ==
1. "Inheriting the Stereo" – 2:44
2. "Cabin Blues" – 2:48
3. "Harangue" – 2:43
4. "Sweetacres" – 4:03
5. "Bright Lights" – 3:08
6. "At the Old Diary" – 4:02
7. "Hubba Hubba Mother" – 3:17
8. "Here Comes Bronco" – 2:59
9. "Losing to Rock'n'Roll" – 2:27
10. "I've Had Enough" – 3:07

== Personnel ==
- Mark Lyons - Vocals, Acoustic Guitar, Bass, Keyboards, Percussion, Harmonica
- Dionne Taylor - Hawaiian Steel Guitar, Harmony Vocals
- Tam Taylor - Violin, Keyboards, Harmony Vocals
- Mark Elton - Double Bass
- John Pain - Electric Bass
- Michelle Lewit - Violin
- Nick Martin, Steve Marrow, Ryan McPhun - Drums
