= Sheep, Dog 'n' Wolf =

2001 video game

- Developer: Infogrames Lyon House
- Publisher: Infogrames
- Directors: Charles Carney; Norbert Cellier
- Producer: Sylvain Chapuis
- Designers: Gregory Couppey; Herve Sliwa
- Artist: Pascal Casolari
- Composer: Eric Caspar
- Platforms: PlayStation; Windows
- Release: PlayStation: FRA: 23 May 2001; UK: 14 September 2001; NA: 1 March 2001; Windows: EU: 14 September 2001
- Genres: Puzzle-platformer; stealth
- Mode: Single-player

Sheep, Dog 'n' Wolf (released as Looney Tunes: Sheep Raider in North America) is a 2001 puzzle-platformer stealth video game developed by Infogrames Lyon House and published by Infogrames for Microsoft Windows and PlayStation.

The game is based on the Warner Bros. series of Looney Tunes cartoons featuring Ralph Wolf and Sam Sheepdog. Controlling Ralph, the player must steal sheep without getting caught by Sam while navigating through a series of levels, including two secret levels and a bonus level.

== Plot ==
After another failed attempt at stealing a sheep from Sam Sheepdog, Ralph Wolf returns home after his shift to relax and enjoy some television in his chair. Daffy Duck bursts in and declares that Ralph is the newest contestant on the game show "Sheep, Dog, and Wolf", or, as Daffy likes to call it, "Who Wants to Be a Sheep Stealer". In this show, Ralph is tasked with successfully stealing sheep from Sam in a variety of environments, though he is not allowed to harm the sheep in any way.

Despite many obstacles and encounters with various characters such as Porky Pig, Elmer Fudd, Yosemite Sam, Gossamer, Toro, and Road Runner, Ralph is finally able to steal Sam's entire flock. However, as he is declared the winner, Marvin the Martian gatecrashes the show, angry at Ralph and Daffy, because a specific sheep that Ralph was forced to fire into the sky, using Yosemite Sam's cannon, in order to win, actually landed on Planet X while Marvin was experimenting with his instant Martians, causing a serious accident which led to the Martians scattering across the planet. Marvin forcibly takes Ralph to Planet X with the task of recovering the Martians. Ralph eventually completes his task and is returned home by Marvin along with the stranded sheep. However, once inside, the sheep is revealed to be Sam in disguise, who grabs Ralph and prepares to vengefully beat him until Ralph's alarm clock sounds, and he wakes up from his sleep, revealing that the story's events were only a dream. Disappointed, Ralph goes outside to start another shift of sheep stealing from Sam.

== Gameplay ==
The goal of each level is to steal one of the sheep from Sam Sheepdog's flock without him noticing and escort it to a marked area. Ralph is able to jump, tiptoe as to not make noise, and dash in case he needs to escape from danger. To aid Ralph in obtaining the sheep, Ralph can mail order various gadgets from Acme, such as rocket packs and dynamite. Certain items can be combined; for example, a fan can be used on a bottle of perfume to have its scent attract one of the sheep from afar. Ralph can also collect lettuces to lure the sheep towards places where Ralph is unable to carry them, such as on a weak bridge.

When approaching Sam, an icon shows up in the corner of the screen, showing that Ralph is in Sam's area. Sam's face shows where Sam's line of sight is, with the centre position looking in Ralph's direction. When it is green, Sam is unable to see or hear Ralph, but he is close to Sam's range. While it is orange, he is in Sam's area and Sam will be able to hear Ralph if he makes too much noise, and see him if he is not hidden in a bush or behind something. If Sam sees or hears Ralph, the icon will turn red and Sam will chase Ralph until he catches and punishes him, or Ralph escapes from his area. With almost each level passing, Sam becomes faster and faster, eventually faster than Ralph so more caution is needed when sneaking around in his area. Each level also has a hidden clock in machine to earn bonuses.

== Reception ==
Reception

Aggregate scores
Aggregator	Score
GameRankings	(PC) 75.00% (PS) 73.04%
Metacritic	(PS) 72/100

Review scores
Publication	Score
AllGame	3.5/5
Game Informer	7.25/10
GameRevolution	B
GameSpot	5.7/10
GameZone	8/10
IGN	8/10
Official U.S. PlayStation Magazine	2.5/5

The game received mixed-to-positive reviews upon release. GameRankings gave the PlayStation version a score of 73.04% and the PC version a score of 75.00%, while Metacritic gave the PlayStation version a 72 out of 100, indicating “mixed or average” reviews.

== See also ==
- Sheep, Dog & Wolf – a New Zealand musician named after the game
