= Down at Your Life =

Studio album by Shaft
- Released: 17 July 2006
- Genre: Rock'n'Roll; Indie
- Length: 38:28
- Label: Lil' Chief Records
- Producer: Z Bob

Shaft chronology
Open Sesame (2006)	Down at Your Life (2006)

Down at Your Life is the second full-length album by Shaft. It was released in 2006 on Lil' Chief Records.

== Track listing ==
All tracks by RJ Cardy

1. "My Favourite Story" – 2:53
2. "Down At Your Life" – 2:56
3. "Inside" – 4:51
4. "Our Blue Hell" – 2:55
5. "Pacific Ocean" – 3:58
6. "Alive Alive" – 3:21
7. "Someone To Blame" – 3:19
8. "Got To Be Strong" – 5:08
9. "I Just Don't Know How To Live My Life" – 4:13
10. "Three Little Pigs" – 5:04
11. " My Momma" – 2:13 (Bonus Track)

== Personnel ==
- Bob Frisbee – producer, mastering, mixing, overdub engineer
- Rich Mixture – organ, percussion, piano, drums, backing vocals, chorus, slide guitar, fender rhodes, mastering, mixing, overdub engineer
