= Open Sesame (Shaft album) =

Studio album by Shaft
- Released: 15 October 2004
- Genre: Rock'n'Roll; Indie
- Length: 49:28
- Label: Lil' Chief Records
- Producer: Z Bob

Shaft chronology
Open Sesame (2004)	Down at Your Life (2006)

Open Sesame is the first full-length album by Shaft. It was released in 2004 on Lil' Chief Records, although a number of the songs featured had been in the band's live set for almost a decade. The band played a show to support the launch of the album in which an attempt was made to feature as many ex-members of the band as possible. The show culminated with nine people on stage, including two drummers and four guitarists.

== Track listing ==
1. "Ginger's Kisses" – 3:33
2. "Cheap Candy" – 3:13
3. "Dinah" – 3:55
4. "Might As Well Be Dumb" – 3:55
5. "Livin' Pumpin' Heart" – 3:25
6. "I Just Wanna Have Your Baby" – 2:24
7. "I Don't Wanna Rock'n'Roll Tonight" – 2:46
8. "Scorpio Rising" – 3:44
9. "One Of Many" – 3:20
10. "Playing With Ourselves" – 2:52
11. "Can You Feel It (Parts 1 & 2)" – 4:02
12. "Just Because" – 2:44
13. "Kein Essen" – 2:12
14. "Rosy Diamond" – 3:20
15. "Sucking The Pig" – 4:12
