= Shugo Tokumaru =

Japanese singer-songwriter and instrumentalist

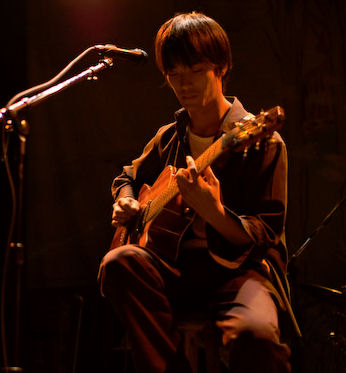
- Shugo Tokumaru at the Bowery Ballroom.

Background information
- Born: 29 May 1980 (age 45)
- Origin: Tokyo
- Genres: Bedroom pop
- Occupations: Singer, songwriter, multi-instrumentalist
- Instrument: Guitar
- Years active: 2004–present
- Labels: Compare Notes (2004-2005); Music Related (2004); Active Suspension (2006); Lil' Chief Records (2006); P-Vine Records (2007-present); Almost Gold Recordings (2008-present); Polyvinyl Record Co. (2011-present)
- Website: shugotokumaru.com

Shugo Tokumaru (トクマルシューゴ, Tokumaru Shūgo; born May 29, 1980) is a Japanese singer-songwriter and multi-instrumentalist, who debuted in May 2004 in America with his album Night Piece. He creates every aspect of his music, including the lyrics, music, arrangements, recording and mixing. He is known for the variety of instruments he uses in his music, using over 100 different traditional and non-traditional instruments in his recordings. Tokumaru is also a member of the Japanese rock band Gellers. Tokumaru's 2010 album Port Entropy was his most commercially successful album in Japan, breaking into the top 40.

== Biography ==
=== Early years ===
Shugo Tokumaru was born and raised in Tokyo. His first instrument was the piano, which he started between 5–6 years old after seeing a friend playing it. Much later on in junior high school, Tokumaru started playing the electric guitar, originally playing songs only by The Clash. He joined a band called Gellers, made up of people he had known throughout his childhood. The band formed around 1994 and at the very beginning, Tokumaru was not a member. He started writing songs at 17 for the band, however had not had much of a need to earlier, as the other guitarist of the band was the chief songwriter. At this point, Tokumaru developed an interest with multi-instrumentalization, thinking that just the guitar/bass/drum set of a standard band wasn't enough.

After finishing high school, Tokumaru traveled overseas for 2 1/2 years, spending most of his time living in Los Angeles. While staying in America, he was a part of a jazz band, and recorded songs in his home.

=== Debut ===
After returning to Japan in 2003, Tokumaru finished recording a 10 track demo album called Fragment. He gave this demo CD to a friend who was an acquaintance of Trevor Sias, owner of the US independent record label Music Related. The label was impressed with the CD, and wanted to release the demo album just as it was; however, Tokumaru did not like the idea. He created an entirely new album, which was released under the label in the United States on May 11, 2004. Night Piece originally planned to be just an American only release, but due to strong sales on internet sites, it was released in other countries. It was released in Japan in August 2004 through the independent label Compare Notes.

Tokumaru released his second album, L.S.T., in 2006, and his third, Exit, in 2007. During this time, his music started to become more recognized globally. L.S.T. was also released in Europe and New Zealand, with Tokumaru performing on a French and Spanish tour. In Japan, Tokumaru performed live at such places as the Ginza Apple Store and Shinjuku Tower Records, and his music started being featured in commercials for companies such as Shiseido and Japan Airlines. Also in 2007, Tokumaru's childhood band Gellers reformed, releasing their debut album and performing at high-profile festivals, such as the Fuji Rock Festival and Borofesta. However, the group went on hiatus in 2008.

In 2008, Tokumaru worked on soundtrack for Kōji Hagiuda directed film Kodomo no Kodomo (コドモのコドモ, Children's Children). He performed his first US tour, with four sold out dates in halls with a capacity of around 2,000 people each. He continued to perform at high-profile Japanese music festivals, such as the Fuji Rock Festival (this time as a solo artist) and Asian Kung-Fu Generation's Nano-Mugen Festival.

=== Commercial success ===
In 2009, Sony used Tokumaru's song "Rum Hee" for commercials for their VAIO L series of touchscreen computers. The resulting extended play, Rum Hee, was Tokumaru's first top 100 release. It was later used again in June 2014 by Sumo Digital in the E3 announcement trailer for LittleBigPlanet 3, and an instrumental version of the song was used as the title music when the game was released on November 18, 2014. In 2010, his fourth album Port Entropy broke into the top 40. He performed his first Japanese tour, featuring 13 dates across the country. Every venue was a sold-out concert. After the tour, Gellers started performing again in 2010.

Tokumaru's song "Parachute" was featured in soundtrack for Canadian film Year of the Carnivore.

== Songwriting ==
Shugo Tokumaru considers some of his influences to be The Beach Boys, older Japanese musicians such as Hachidai Nakamura, and traditional Japanese music styles, such as gagaku. Tokumaru plays all of his instruments on his albums, and records his songs alone. Tokumaru sings his lyrics almost entirely in Japanese. The basis of his lyrics come from his daily dream diary. When writing music, he first comes up with a melody solely inside his head. When creating the song, he tries to use as many instruments as possible, to illustrate the different aspects of his dreams.

== Discography ==
=== Original albums ===
Year	Album information	Release date	Oricon Albums Charts	Reported sales
2003	Fragment: Pre-debut demo album; Formats: CD	2003	—	—
2004	Night Piece: Official debut album; Label: Music Related (ML-12) (US); Released in Japan on August 20, 2004, through Compare Notes (cn-0007); Formats: CD, vinyl (Record Store Day 2015)	May 11, 2004	—	—
2005	L.S.T.: Label: Compare Notes (cn-0006) (JP), Polyvinyl Record Co. (US); Formats: CD, vinyl (Record Store Day 2015)	August 25, 2005	—	—
2007	Exit: Label: P-Vine Records (PCD-18518) (JP); Formats: CD, digital download	October 19, 2007	239	1,400
2010	Port Entropy: Label: P-Vine Records (PCD-18621) (JP), Polyvinyl Record Co. (US); Formats: CD, digital download, vinyl	April 21, 2010	33	10,000
2012	In Focus?: Formats: CD, vinyl	November 7, 2012	—	—
2016	Toss: Label: P-Vine Records (JP), Polyvinyl Record Co. (US); Formats: LP, CD, digital download	October 19, 2016 (Japan), April 28, 2017 (North America)	—	—
2024	Song Symbiosis: Label: TONOFON; Formats: CD, digital download	July 17, 2024	—	—
2024	Other Tracks: Label: TONOFON; Formats: digital download	December 24, 2024	—	—

=== Other albums ===
Year	Album Information	Oricon Albums Charts	Reported sales
2005	NPRMX: Remix album for Night Piece.; Released: April, 2005; Label: Our Small Label (OSR-CDR1) (US); Formats: CD	—	—
2009	Rum Hee (ラムヒー, Ramu Hī): Extended play.; Released: April 2, 2009; Label: P-Vine Records (PCD-4396) (JP); Formats: CD, digital download	85	2,800

=== Singles ===
- "Vista" (January 2006, vinyl single)
- "Sleigh Ride" (November 25, 2009, digital download)

=== Other appearances ===
- "Sleeping Bird (Remixed by Shugo Tokumaru)" (February 2006, Apartment's Apremix album)
- "Tournament (Remixed by Shugo Tokumaru)" (March 2007, Moools' "Tournament" remix single)
- "Akairo Elegy" (赤色エレジー, Red Elegy) (June 2007, various artists album Akairo Elegy Mania, featuring just covers of Morio Agata's song of the same name)
- "Spiderwoman w/ Shugo Tokumaru" (January 2008, David Fenech's album Polochon Battle)
- "Micro Guitar Music" (July 2008, various artists Kyokutō Saizensen 2)
- "With Pail (Shugo Tokumaru Remix)" (July 2008, .Tape. remix album .Tape. Repainted)
- "Jitensha Dorobō (Shugo Tokumaru Remix)" (自転車泥棒, Bicycle Thief) (July 2009, Unicorn URMX)
- "401 Circuit (Shugo Tokumaru Remix)" (March 2010, I Am Robot and Proud remix album Uphill City Remixes & Collaborations)
- Vicious Circles Vol 1 (Digital)
- "Video Killed The Radio Star" (September 2011, Polyvinyl Records's Japan 3.11.11: A Benefit Album)
- "Confusão / ざわめき" (October 2024, Afonso Cabral's Demorar album)
- "Hitorigotsu" (ひとりごつ, Monologue) (June 2022, sang by Makoto Tanaka (田中誠人) as Hachiware, ending theme for the Chiikawa anime)
