= The Ruby Suns (album) =

Ryan McPhun & The Ruby Suns (AKA The Ruby Suns)

Studio album by The Ruby Suns
- Released: 9 October 2005
- Genre: Indie pop
- Length: 37:07
- Label: Lil' Chief Records, Memphis Industries
- Producer: Ryan McPhun

The Ruby Suns chronology
Ryan McPhun & The Ruby Suns (AKA The Ruby Suns) (2005)	Lichen Ears EP (2007)

Alternative cover
- Modified art as released in the UK on Memphis Industries

Professional ratings
Review scores
Source	Rating
The Guardian	3/5 stars
The Independent	4/5 stars
Mojo	4/5 stars
Pitchfork Media	7/10
Uncut	4/5 stars

The Ruby Suns is the first full-length album released by the New Zealand based band The Ruby Suns. The band was originally called Ryan McPhun & The Ruby Suns and the album was released with this title in New Zealand on Lil' Chief Records. The album has subsequently been released in the UK on Memphis Industries in 2006 and in Australia on Popfrenzy in 2007 with different art, and the title truncated to reflect the band's new name. The 2007 Australian release of the album contains two bonus tracks, both of which are from a self-pressed single by the band in 2007.

== Track listing ==
1. "Trees Like Kids" – 1:12
2. "Sleep In The Garden" – 1:43
3. "Maasai Mara" – 3:07
4. "Look Out Sos!" – 4:05
5. "Function of The Sun" – 1:10
6. "It's Hard To Let You Know" – 3:54
7. "Criterion" – 4:45
8. "Birthday On Mars" – 4:52
9. "Trepidation Part One" – 1:21
10. "Trepidation Part Two" – 3:30
11. "My Ten Years On Auto-Pilot" – 4:35
12. "There's Soup At The End Of The Tunnel" – 2:56
13. "Sister Brother (Australian release bonus track)" – 2:13
14. "Michi Ni Mayoimashita (Australian release bonus track)" – 1:15
