= Lichen Ears (EP) =

Lichen Ears EP

EP by The Ruby Suns
- Released: 19 November 2007
- Genre: Indie pop
- Length: 27:07
- Label: Lil' Chief Records
- Producer: Ryan McPhun

The Ruby Suns chronology
The Ruby Suns (2005)	Lichen Ears EP (2007)	Sea Lion (2008)

Lichen Ears is an EP by New Zealand band The Ruby Suns, featuring a number of songs from the same sessions that produced the band's 2008 album Sea Lion. It was released in 2007 exclusively on Auckland's Lil' Chief Records as a limited pressing of 300 copies.

== Track listing ==
No.	Title	Length
1.	"Tui You"	2:15
2.	"Papatuanuku"	2:37
3.	"Gibble"	1:56
4.	"Give Advice"	3:35
5.	"Khaki Kikoi"	2:37
6.	"Gibble"	14:12
