= The Eversons =

New Zealand pop band

- Origin: Wellington, New Zealand
- Genre: Indie pop
- Years active: 2010–present
- Labels: Lil' Chief Records (New Zealand); ThisTime Records (Japan)
- Members: Mark Turner; Tim Shann; Blair Everson; Christopher Young
- Past members: Alex Freer; Jacob Moore
- Website: The Eversons at Lil' Chief Records

The Eversons are a four-member indie pop band originally from Wellington, New Zealand, currently living in London. Self-dubbed "a guitar group," vocals are handled by all members. They released their self-titled debut EP in 2011 on Lil' Chief Records, with a follow-up LP, Summer Feeling, released in 2012 through Lil' Chief Records in New Zealand and ThisTime Records in Japan.

== History ==
=== Founding ===
The Eversons were founded in Wellington, New Zealand by Mark Turner (bass), Tim Shann (drums), Blair Everson (guitar), and Christopher Young (guitar), with all members handling vocals.

Mark Turner had previously built a name for his work in the bubblegum pop synth group Little Pictures with Johanna Freeman. He began making music with drummer Tim Shann during that time, and near the end of 2010 they began seriously considering forming a band, recruiting Everson and Young as experienced guitarists and musicians. The band draws some of its style from "quirky guitar rock that reaches back from Buddy Holly through to the Modern Lovers and on to Pavement," and in interviews the band members frequently call themselves a "guitar group."

=== The Eversons EP (2011) ===
The group's first EP was recorded in early 2011, using the same studio where the band practices and records. Released in October 25, 2011, The Eversons received a glowing review in Obscure Sound, who quoted "The Eversons are highlights in the fusion of past and present that is art-punk, a genre most recently propelled by names like Art Brut and The Rakes. The five tracks here are full of the vibrancy found in early punk; initial simplicity evolves to intricate wit over guitar-heavy arrangements that take turns alternating lead with the singer." Spindle also wrote the EP, "may very well be one of the strongest perfectly crafted E.P.s since the Nerves' only offering back in '76, and one of the year's greatest releases period."

Chris Young and Mark Turner often share lead vocal duties on the album, with other members contributing vocals as well. Spindle wrote, "the vocals on these tracks are just as essential to their music [as the guitars], and the backing vocals are so prevalent they are less backing vocals and more of supporting characters like a Vonnegut novel."

=== Summer Feeling (2012) ===
After the EP the band put out a number of digital singles. One of these, "Harlot", became controversial for slut-shaming sex workers. A former bandmate and partner of Turner's, Johanna Freeman, considered the song a "calculated" attack on her and labelled it misogynistic and offensive.

The next single, "Marriage", also became controversial for its misogynistic content. Its video treats the subject of sexual assault through birth control sabotage in a comedic manner.

Turner attempted to get restraining orders placed against two women after they criticised the band on social media for the songs "Harlot" and "Marriage".

Allegations against Turner led to venues cancelling bookings and refusing to host the band. Ian Jorgensen cancelled the band performing at a concert organised for A Low Hum, saying that the allegations were common knowledge among the New Zealand indie music scene.

Their first full LP, Summer Feeling, was released on Lil' Chief Records in 2012, both digitally and on vinyl. About their LP, Stuff.nz wrote, "It's rare these days to hear a band that has honed its sound as sharply and convincingly as The Eversons have. Clever songs, catchy, funny, playful, subversive - every song with its own pop hook to hang on and from; loads of ideas. And they back it up live." The vocals and harmonies were praised by Neotomic Records.

=== EPs, Japan, and London (2012–2015) ===
After the release of Summer Feeling, the Eversons released two EPs. The first was a tribute EP titled ‘With A Little Help From Our Friends EP’, featuring covers of The Eversons songs by Princess Chelsea, Street Chant, Jonathan Bree, The Boa Constrictors and Matthew Crawley. In 2015 the band released a Japanese language EP ‘The Emilys: Super Awesome Cartoon Band EP’ They were reimagined as a cartoon band called The Emilys through multiple animated videos. In 2015 they toured through Japan where they discovered a large Eversons’ fanbase. They also started recording and releasing a podcast about their experiences, ‘Hicks From The Sticks’ In August 2015 they relocated to London where they are currently based.

=== Stuck in New Zealand LP (2016) ===
The band’s second album ‘Stuck In New Zealand’ was released in November 2016 The first single ‘Emily’ was released February 2015. The video for ‘Emily’ was directed by Thunderlips, and won Best Music Video and the 2015 Show Me Shorts awards.

=== Superorganism and record label dumping (2017–present) ===
The final four members joined Orono Noguchi, Ruby, B, and Soul to form the band Superorganism. Turner left Superorganism in 2022.

In 2019 their record label, Lil' Chief Records, ended their relationship with the band and took down their back catalog due to allegations against Turner. They said they were against sexual misconduct and apologised unreservedly for not acting sooner.

== Members ==
Current

- Mark Turner - vocals, saxophone, guitar, bass
- Christopher Young - vocals, guitar
- Tim Shann - vocals, drums, bass
- Blair Everson - vocals, guitar, bass

Past

- Jacob Moore - drums, vocals
- Alex Freer - drums

== Discography ==
=== The Eversons ===
==== Albums ====
- 2012: Summer Feeling (Lil' Chief Records)
- 2012: "With A Little Help From Our Friends E.P." (Lil' Chief Records)
- 2013: "Summer Feeling Extended Edition" (ThisTime Records)
- 2016: "Stuck in New Zealand" (Lil' Chief Records)

==== EPs ====
- 2011: The Eversons E.P. (Lil' Chief Records)
- 2012: With a Little Help From Our Friends EP. (Lil' Chief Records)
- 2015: The Emilys: Super Awesome Cartoon Band EP (ThisTime Records)

==== Singles ====
- 2011: Gravy Rainbow (Disasteradio cover) (Lil' Chief Records)
- 2011: Hyacinth Girl (Lil' Chief Records)
- 2011: Vote For ACT (Lil' Chief Records)
- 2012: Could It Ever Get Better? (Lil' Chief Records)
- 2012: Terminally Lame (Lil' Chief Records)
- 2012: The End Of The World (Lil' Chief Records)
- 2012: The Christmas Suicide Song (Lil' Chief Records)
- 2013: Creepy (Lil' Chief Records, ThisTime Records)
- 2013: Marriage (Lil' Chief Records, ThisTime Records)
- 2015: Emily (Lil' Chief Records)
