= L.S.T. (album) =

2005 Shugo Tokumaru album

Studio album by Shugo Tokumaru
- Released: August 25, 2005
- Genre: Indie pop
- Length: 39:24
- Label: Compare Notes Records
- Producer: Shugo Tokumaru

Shugo Tokumaru chronology
Night Piece (2004)	L.S.T. (2005)	Exit (2007)

Singles from L.S.T.
- 1. "Vista" Released: 2006

Professional ratings
Review scores
Source	Rating
AllMusic	4/5 stars
Cokemachineglow	favorable
Exclaim!	favorable
Pitchfork	7.0/10
PopMatters	favorable

L.S.T. is a studio album by Shugo Tokumaru. It was originally released via Compare Notes Records on August 25, 2005, in Japan. In 2006, it was re-released via Active Suspension in Europe, as well as via Lil' Chief Records in New Zealand.

== Critical reception ==
Jesse Jarnow of AllMusic gave the album 4 stars out of 5, saying, "[Tokumaru's] electro-acoustic micro-miniatures are joyous contraptions, layers and textures slathered on with careful abandon, melodies separated between a dizzying array of guitars, pianos, chimes, whistles, glockenspiels, and stop-time rhythms." He added, "Thanks to the constant instrumentation changes, the songs stay fresh, retaining a bedroom pop vibe despite their utterly obsessive arrangements."

In 2010, Cokemachineglow placed it at number 96 on the "Top 100 Albums of the 2000s" list.

== Track listing ==
No.	Title	Length
1.	"Mist"	3:27
2.	"Mushina"	4:06
3.	"Mizukagami"	4:01
4.	"Karte"	2:08
5.	"Kiiro"	4:00
6.	"Vista"	4:00
7.	"Metrion"	2:21
8.	"Yukinohaka"	4:24
9.	"Amayadori"	3:24
10.	"5 A.M. / Tears Below the Freezing Point"	7:53

New Zealand edition bonus tracks
No.	Title	Length
11.	"Drop"	2:12
12.	"Loupe"	1:50
