= Sea Lion (album) =

Studio album by The Ruby Suns
- Released: 21 January 2008
- Genre: Indie pop
- Length: 41:41
- Labels: Lil' Chief Records, Memphis Industries, Sub Pop
- Producer: Ryan McPhun

The Ruby Suns chronology
Lichen Ears EP (2007)	Sea Lion (2008)	Fight Softly (2010)

Professional ratings
Review scores
Source	Rating
Allmusic	4.5/5 stars
The Arts Section	(Positive)
The Independent	4/5 stars
Mojo	4/5 stars
New Zealand Herald	4/5 stars
NME	7/10 stars
Pitchfork Media	(8.3/10.0)

Sea Lion is the second full-length album released by the New Zealand-based band The Ruby Suns, and their first since signing to US label Sub Pop.

== Track listing ==
No.	Title	Length
1.	"Blue Penguin"	5:01
2.	"Oh, Mojave"	2:32
3.	"Tane Mahuta"	2:58
4.	"There Are Birds"	4:13
5.	"It's Mwangi In Front of Me"	3:37
6.	"Remember"	4:32
7.	"Ole Rinka"	4:20
8.	"Adventure Tour"	3:51
9.	"Kenya Dig It?"	4:17
10.	"Morning Sun"	6:26

== Release details ==
Release format	Label	Country	Cat. No.	Release date
CD digipak, original art	Lil' Chief Records	New Zealand	LCR 021	21 January 2008
CD jewel case	Memphis Industries	United Kingdom/Europe	MI0110CD	3 March 2008
CD digipak, alternate art	Sub Pop	North America/Japan	SP766	4 March 2008
