= Gellers =

Japanese rock band

- Origin: Tokyo, Japan
- Genres: Alternative rock Post punk Indie rock
- Years active: 1997–present
- Label: Compare Notes Records(map)
- Members: Kenichi Kawasoe; Yukihisa Tashiro; Shugo Tokumaru; Hinata Okubo; Shingo Shinmachi (chanson sigeru)
- Past members: Kazutoshi Hara
- Website: http://www.gellers.info/

Gellers is a Japanese rock band formed in Tokyo, taking influences from The Clash, Pavement and the Sex Pistols.

== History ==
Gellers is a band that consists of childhood friends who performed live at Fuji Rock Festival in 2007 and 2010.

== Members ==
- Kenichi Kawasoe (川副 賢一, Kawasoe Kenichi) – vocals, guitar
- Yukihisa Tashiro (田代 幸久, Tashiro Yukihisa) – vocals, synthesizer, Percussion
- Shugo Tokumaru (トクマルシューゴ, Tokumaru Shugo) – vocals, guitar
- Hinata Okubo (大久保 日向, Okubo Hinata) – bass guitar, Recording Engineer
- Shingo Shinmachi（chanson sigeru） (新町 慎悟（シャンソンシゲル）, Shinmachi Shingo (chanson sigeru)) – drums

== Discography ==
=== Album ===
- GELLERS(2007)

=== Single ===
- Guatemala(2011)
