= Port Entropy =

2010 studio album by Shugo Tokumaru

Studio album by Shugo Tokumaru
- Released: April 21, 2010
- Genre: Indie pop
- Length: 37:24
- Label: P-Vine Records
- Producer: Shugo Tokumaru

Shugo Tokumaru chronology
Exit (2007)	Port Entropy (2010)	In Focus? (2012)

Professional ratings
Aggregate scores
Source	Rating
Metacritic	71/100
Review scores
Source	Rating
AllMusic	4/5 stars
Clash	6/10
Consequence of Sound	B
Filter	79/100
Pitchfork	6.2/10
PopMatters	6/10 stars
Tiny Mix Tapes	3/5 stars

Port Entropy is a studio album by Shugo Tokumaru. It was originally released via P-Vine Records on April 21, 2010 in Japan. It peaked at number 33 on the Oricon Albums Chart.

== Critical reception ==
At Metacritic, which assigns a weighted average score out of 100 to reviews from mainstream critics, Port Entropy received an average score of 71% based on 13 reviews, indicating "generally favorable reviews".

Adam Kivel of Consequence of Sound gave the album a grade of B, saying, "It's a wonderful record of a musician and songwriter in his prime, but one that requires a willingness to go on a ride, with an open mind and a willingness to have some fun." Mehan Jayasuriya of PopMatters gave the album 6 stars out of 10, saying, "While Port Entropy contains some of Tokumaru's most accomplished compositions yet, on the whole, it's a bit too monochrome for its own good."

== Track listing ==
No.	Title	Length
1.	"Platform"	0:44
2.	"Tracking Elevator"	3:20
3.	"Linne"	3:51
4.	"Lahaha"	3:11
5.	"Rum Hee"	3:46
6.	"Laminate"	3:59
7.	"River Low"	2:18
8.	"Straw"	2:37
9.	"Drive-thru"	3:28
10.	"Suisha"	3:16
11.	"Orange"	4:11
12.	"Malerina"	2:43

== Charts ==
Chart	Peak position
Japanese Albums (Oricon)	33

== Release history ==
Region	Date	Label
Japan	April 21, 2010	P-Vine Records
Europe	October 18, 2010	Souterrain Transmissions
United States	February 15, 2011	Polyvinyl Record Co.
