= Edmund Cake =

- Born: Edmund McWilliams; 2 August 1972 (age 54)
- Origin: New Zealand
- Genres: Alternative rock, psychedelic rock, pop rock
- Occupations: Music producer, singer-songwriter, musician
- Years active: 1991–present
- Label: Lil' Chief Records
- Website: Lil' Chief Records: Edmund Cake

Edmund Cake is the musical solo project of Edmund McWilliams, an alternative rock musician, singer-songwriter, and producer. Formerly of Bressa Creeting Cake in the 1990s, after the dissolution of the band in 1997 he released the 2004 solo album Downtown Puff on Lil' Chief Records. In 2009 he released another album with the band Pie Warmer.

== Early years ==
Edmund McWilliams was born and raised in Auckland, New Zealand, where he attended school. From a young age he was interested in music and recording, at one point modifying his father's "prized Pye radiogram" by disabling the turntable, all so he could turn it into an amplifier for a new keyboard.

== Music career ==
=== Bressa Creeting Cake ===
Bressa Creeting Cake, a New Zealand rock band originally named Breast Secreting Cake, formed in Auckland around 1991 around the nucleus of Cake and his school-mates Geoff Maddock and Joel Wilton. They played together on songs while at school, but the first line up to gig and release music included Dave Neilsen.

The band's first recordings were made by McWilliams on four tracks and Ed and Dave at a 16-track studio the band was lent. A few of these songs were being played on local college radio station bFM by 1994. They played live irregularly, often in monk costumes. At the request of Flying Nun Records' parent company Mushroom Records, the band changed its name to Bressa Creeting Cake. McWilliams, Maddock and Wilton each took on a part of that name as their own stage name.

By the time the band recorded its first EP and album in 1996/7 Dave Neilsen had left and the record was made by the original three members only. The self-titled debut LP was produced by Edmund Cake and engineered by Edmund and Joe. It was called "one terrific bizarro-pop album" by The New Zealand Herald. Through this period the band played live rarely. By 1999, the band had ended, with Maddock and Wilton playing in Goldenhorse.

=== Solo period ===
After the dissolution of the band, Cake went on to work as a solo artist under various monikers. In the studio he collaborated with Neil Finn on the soundtrack to Christine Jeff's film Rain, also working on various other film and short film soundtracks. He also served as a sound designer for theatre projects.

Downtown Puff (2004)

In 2004 Cake released his solo album Downtown Puff on the label Lil' Chief Records. Much of the material on the album was devised while McWilliams was living in a third-floor studio space on Gore Street in Auckland's red-light district.

Although Downtown Puff was released as a solo project, it represents a multitude of musical collaborations, including Anna Coddington as well as Neil Finn and Tim Finn. Two of the other collaborators were Geoff Maddock and Joel Wilton of Bressa Creeting Cake. The New Zealand Herald gave it 4/5 stars, calling it "an album that is as genuinely eccentric as it is truly inspired."

=== Pie Warmer ===
In summer of 2007 it was reported that Cake was in a new indie pop band, Pie Warmer. The group had been assembled in 2005 after Cake was released from a mental health clinic in Auckland. It includes Cake on vocals, Jason Smith (keys), Tamasin Taylor (violin, vibraphone and vocals) and Cole Goodley (drums). Their first album, The Fearsome Feeling, was released in 2009, and was included in Nick Bollinger's '100 essential New Zealand albums.'

As of 2009 Cake has been featured as musician, producer, or engineer on albums from Tim Guy, Anika Moa, Herriot Row, Don McGlashan, Duchess, The Brunettes, The Chills and Brand New Math.

== Discography ==
=== Studio albums ===
- 1997: Bressa Creeting Cake by Bressa Creeting Cake
- 2004: Downtown Puff as Edmund Cake (Lil' Chief Records)
- 2009: The Fearsome Feeling by Pie Warmer
