= Voom (band) =

- Origin: New Zealand
- Genres: Indie pop
- Years active: 1993–present
- Label: Lil' Chief Records

Voom is a New Zealand band based in Auckland consisted of 4 members: Buzz Moller (vocals, guitar), Murray Fisher (guitar), Nick Buckton (bass, backing vocals) and Josh Sorenson (drums).

== Background ==
The New Zealand band Voom formed in 1993, and released their first album 5 years later. By the time their second album was released, in 2006 both Manetto and Macaskill had departed, leaving Moller as the only original member. The band has been a staple of Auckland campus radio for many years, and has had a number of student radio hits including "Beth", "Relax", and "Be Your Boy". The current lineup of the band consists of Moller, Murray Fisher (of Goodshirt), Nick Buckton (previously of The Tokey Tones) and Josh Sorenson. They are currently signed to Auckland label Lil' Chief Records. The English band the Voom Blooms was named after that band.

Since leaving Voom, Macaskill and Manetto have worked together musically on numerous occasions producing music most recently in their Twenty Ten Project along with Simon Harris and Tony Shields (recording with Zero Studios, a recording studio owned by Manetto himself). Mac Macaskill died on 13 September 2012, leaving Manetto and Moller as the two surviving original members.

== Discography ==
Date	Title	Label	Catalog Number	Reference
Albums
1998	Now I Am Me	Antenna Records		
2006	Hello, Are You There?	Lil' Chief Records	LCR 016	
2025	Something Good Is Happening	Flying Nun Records	FN615CD	
