= Exit (Shugo Tokumaru album) =

Studio album by Shugo Tokumaru
- Released: October 19, 2007
- Genre: Indie pop
- Length: 35:21
- Label: P-Vine Records
- Producer: Shugo Tokumaru

Shugo Tokumaru chronology
L.S.T. (2005)	Exit (2007)	Port Entropy (2010)

Exit is the studio album by Shugo Tokumaru. It was originally released via P-Vine Records on October 19, 2007 in Japan. It peaked at number 239 on the Oricon Albums Chart.

== Background ==
Tokumaru plays more than fifty different instruments on the album, and claims that he "drew inspiration" for its music from Japanese pop and a pile of old Beatles cassettes. Both of these were very influential music styles. He attained the album's experimental sound using everyday household objects such as a fork, ashtray, doorbell, wind-up toys; along with more traditional instruments such as acoustic guitar and wooden flutes. Most or all of the instruments were played in major key in a clipped, almost clockwork cadence. The album was mixed and recorded on his laptop, using the popular digital audio program Pro Tools.

== Critical reception ==
Professional ratings
Aggregate scores
Source	Rating
Metacritic	88/100
Review scores
Source	Rating
AllMusic	4/5 stars
Pitchfork	8.0/10
PopMatters	9/10
Spin	4/5 stars

At Metacritic, which assigns a weighted average score out of 100 to reviews from mainstream critics, Exit received an average score of 88 based on 7 reviews, indicating "universal acclaim".

The Boston Globe's Matthew Shaer praised Exit as "a tribute to the unexpected beauty of everyday things" and "a defense of playful digression for digression's sake alone". Chris Dahlen of Pitchfork wrote, "[Tokumaru is] gently mining 1960s pop from around the globe and capturing it with a soft production and a sense of humor." Dan Raper of PopMatters said, "Irrespective of biography and language, the album has a sunny, refreshing optimism that hardly feels out of date." In UR Chicago, Bob Nanna wrote that the "curious whimsy" of opener "Parachute" is enough to "beg repeat listens and intense curiosity for what's to come".

== Track listing ==
No.	Title	Length
1.	"Parachute"	3:04
2.	"Green Rain"	4:53
3.	"Clocca"	3:27
4.	"Future Umbrella"	2:04
5.	"Button"	4:02
6.	"Sanganichi"	2:37
7.	"D.P.O."	1:51
8.	"Hidamari"	4:37
9.	"La La Radio"	5:28
10.	"Wedding"	3:16

== Personnel ==
Credits adapted from liner notes.

- Shugo Tokumaru – all audio
- Itoken – drums (on "Clocca" and "La La Radio")
- Kei Tanaka – double bass (on "Clocca" and "La La Radio")
- Yumiko – accordion (on "La La Radio")
- Machida Shizen Kindergarten – chorus (on "Button")
- Mandy Parnell – mastering

== Charts ==
Chart	Peak position
Japanese Albums (Oricon)	239

== Release history ==
Region	Date	Label	Format	Catalog
Japan	October 19, 2007	P-Vine Records	CD	PCD-18518
United States	September 2, 2008	Almost Gold Recordings	CD	31960
