= Songbook (The Nudie Suits album) =

Studio album by The Nudie Suits
- Released: 31 October 2003
- Genre: Indie pop
- Length: 38:19
- Label: Lil' Chief Records
- Producer: Mark Lyons

The Nudie Suits chronology
Songbook (2003)	Sweetacres (2006)

Professional ratings
Review scores
Source	Rating
New Zealand Herald	3/5 stars

Songbook is the first album from Auckland band The Nudie Suits. It was recorded between 1999 and 2000 on a Fostex R8 8-track recorder in St. Kevins Arcade, Auckland.

== Track listing ==
1. "Up The Buhi" – 2:56
2. "Travellin' Library" – 3:24
3. "Hasten Down To Music City" – 3:05
4. "Holy Ghost (In Back Of You)" – 3:48
5. "You've Been Doctored" – 2:51
6. "(Dancing Like A) Hustable" – 3:48
7. "Look Out Djuna" – 3:03
8. "Those Blows" – 3:04
9. "Little Too Loose There" – 2:11
10. "Let The Party Go On" – 3:39
11. "Hey Bony" – 2:11
12. "Who'll Stop Pop" – 4:19

== Personnel ==
- Mark Lyons – vocals, acoustic guitar, ukulele, electric guitar, piano, percussion, harmonica
- Dionne Taylor – Hawaiian steel guitar, harmony vocals, autoharp
- Tam Taylor – violin
- Malcolm Deans – drums
- Paul Mortenson – bass, harmony vocals, piano
- Ricky McShane – drums
- Jonathan Bree – bass
