= The Indifferent Velvet Void =

Studio album by Alec Bathgate
- Released: 11 November 2004
- Genre: Indie pop
- Length: 40:12
- Label: Lil' Chief Records LCR009
- Producer: Alec Bathgate

Alec Bathgate chronology
| Gold Lame (1996) | The Indifferent Velvet Void (2004) |

The Indifferent Velvet Void is only the second full-length solo album by Alec Bathgate, despite a long career as one half of Tall Dwarfs and co-founder of New Zealand punk bands The Enemy and Toy Love. It was released in 2004 on Lil' Chief Records.

All but one of the songs on the album were written by Bathgate. The remaining track, "Overundersidewaysdown", is a cover of a track by The Yardbirds.

== Track listing ==
1. "In the Shadows" – 2:45
2. "Ebb & Flow" – 2:31
3. "We're All Babies" – 3:48
4. "Should I Wake Up?" – 2:11
5. "Out of My Head" – 2:24
6. "Vitriol" – 2:47
7. "Slow Fuzz" – 3:30
8. "Slight Return" – 1:09
9. "Faked" – 3:01
10. "Overundersidewaysdown" (Dreja, McCarty, Beck, Relf, Samwell-Smith) – 2:55
11. "Broken Cup" – 2:59
12. "The Indifferent Velvet Void" – 3:34
13. "Fear & Loathing" – 3:01
14. "New Day" – 2:34
15. "Closing Down" – 1:00
