= The Dance Reduction Agents =

Studio album by The Reduction Agents
- Released: 20 April 2006
- Genre: Indie pop
- Length: 40:06
- Label: Lil' Chief Records; Honorary Bedouin Records
- Producer: Lawrence Arabia

Professional ratings
Review scores
Source	Rating
New Zealand Herald	4/5 stars

The Dance Reduction Agents is the debut album from New Zealand band The Reduction Agents. It was written and produced by James Milne, who also creates music under the pseudonym Lawrence Arabia. It was released simultaneously with the debut Lawrence Arabia album. Both albums were co-released by Milne's own Honorary Bedouin Records and Lil' Chief Records. Two songs from the album ("The Pool" and "80's Celebration") appear in the soundtrack to the film Eagle vs Shark.

== Track listing ==
1. "Cold Glass Tube" – 4:50
2. "80's Celebration" – 2:21
3. "Mississippi Moonshine Girls" – 2:41
4. "Last Night's Love" – 3:19
5. "Freeways" – 1:20
6. "Urban Yard" – 3:02
7. "Sweet Ingredients" – 3:49
8. "Our Jukebox Run Is Over" – 3:38
9. "The Pool" – 2:26
10. "Waiting For Your Love" – 2:51
11. "Couldn't Anymore" – 6:47
12. "Cabinets and Mountaintops" – 3:02
