= Hello, Are You There? =

Studio album by Voom
- Released: 5 June 2006
- Genre: Indie pop
- Length: 40:30
- Label: Lil' Chief Records

Voom chronology
Now I Am Me (1998)	Hello, Are You There? (2006)

Professional ratings
Review scores
Source	Rating
New Zealand Herald	link

Hello, Are You There? is the second album from Voom, and their first for Lil' Chief Records. It was released in 2006.

== Track listing ==
1. "Beautiful Day" – 2:54
2. "B Your Boy" – 3:15
3. "Feel" – 2:18
4. "Ride of Your Life" – 1:35
5. "King Kong" – 3:15
6. "Happy Just Bumming Around" – 2:30
7. "Not Even a Dream" – 1:32
8. "We're So Lost" – 2:40
9. "Let's Go Home" – 1:38
10. "I Want My Baby" – 4:45
11. "Hello, Are You There?" – 2:55
12. "No Real Reality" – 2:58
13. "My Friend Satan" – 2:29
14. "You Were a Man" – 2:27
15. "I'm Leaving Forever" – 1:44
16. "I Went to Sleep" – 1:35
