= Lil' Chief Records =

New Zealand indie pop record label

- Founded: 2002
- Founder: Jonathan Bree; Scott Mannion
- Genre: Indie pop
- Country of origin: New Zealand
- Location: Auckland
- Official website: lilchiefrecords.com

Lil' Chief Records is a New Zealand–based indie pop record label formed in 2002. Operating from the Auckland suburb of Mt. Eden, it was founded on releases by The Tokey Tones and The Brunettes. The label's roster now includes a collective of pop artists such as Jonathan Bree, Princess Chelsea, The Ruby Suns, and Edmund Cake.

== History ==
=== Founding ===
Lil' Chief Records was founded in New Zealand by indie pop musicians Scott Mannion and Jonathan Bree in 2002. The two men had met that year in Marbecks Record Store in Auckland, where Bree was working at the time. They discovered they were both bedroom recording artists who shared a number of influences. Likewise, both were having difficulty finishing their respective albums and finding a label, particularly since the trend in New Zealand at the time was towards guitar-based rock bands.

They decided to form their own label to focus on a niche of "100% orchestrated pop music from the New Zealand music scene," citing Factory Records, Flying Nun, and Creation Records as inspiration. Lawrence Mikkelsen, a friend of Mannion's and an early supporter of the label, volunteered as the label's "post master general" and archivist.

=== Initial releases ===
The label's first release was the debut LP of Bree's band The Brunettes. Released October 2002, Holding Hands, Feeding Ducks was a joint release with EMI New Zealand. The album received a glowing review from AllMusic, as did the label's second release, The Brunette's 2003 The Boyracer EP. Bree produced both albums.

The label soon set up its headquarters in the Auckland flat of Gareth Shute, a local writer and musician who had befriended Scott Mannion. Dubbed 'The Ghetto,' the large flat's rooms and graffiti-lined garage became a regular rehearsal space, as well as a recording studio for many of the label's future releases. As of 2013, it continues to be the location of operations.

The next two albums on the label were released simultaneously in 2003. Caterpillar and Butterfly by The Tokey Tones both featured and were produced by label founder Scott Mannion. Members of The Brunettes guested on some of the tracks, and when playing live The Tokey Tones have since relied on a revolving cast of musicians from other Lil' Chief Records bands, such as The Brunettes and The Ruby Suns. The New Zealand Herald stated "There has been nothing quite so tasteful, fully realized or confident in Kiwi pop," about the releases.

Later that year indie pop band The Nudie Suits released their album Songbook on the label. Frontman Mark Lyons was both Bree's cousin and had been a mentor in Bree's formative years.

=== Development ===
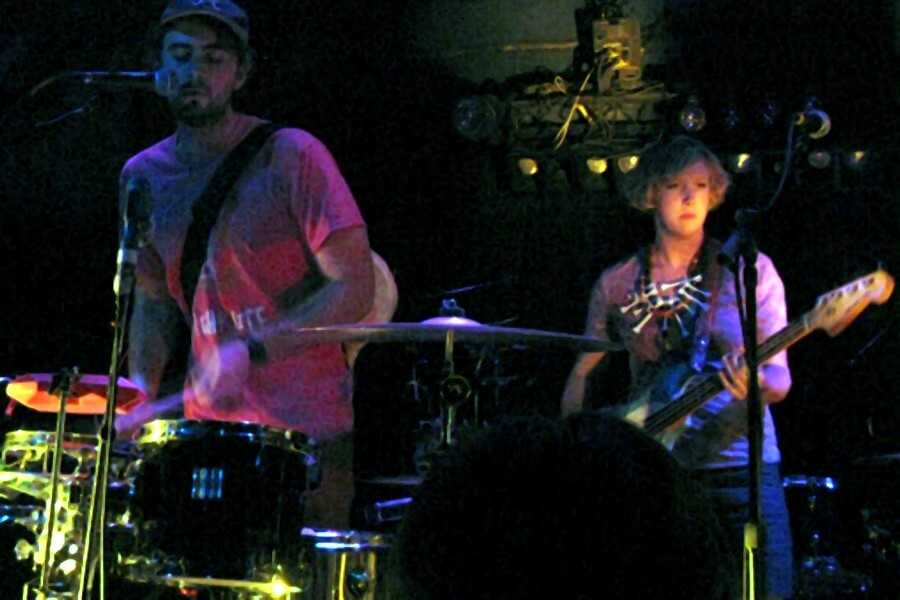
The Ruby Suns released their debut album on LCR in 2005

In 2004, the band The Ruby Suns was formed when Ryan McPhun moved to Auckland from California and started playing in The Brunettes and The Tokey Tones.

In 2005 Edmund Cake released his solo album Downtown Puff on the label, which was followed by Shaft's debut LP Open Sesame and releases by Alec Bathgate and The Ruby Suns. The label's community of musicians also formed a cover band called Disciples of Macca, which focused on solo Paul McCartney and Wings material.

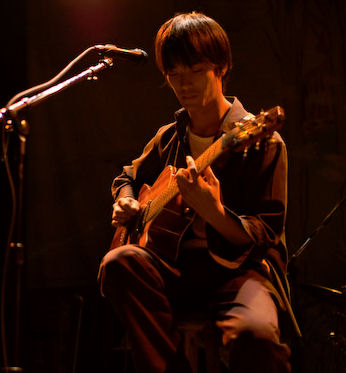
Shugo playing his guitar

Shugo Tokumaru's first release on the label was his sophomore album L.S.T. (2006). Also in 2005 the label released Now We Are Three!!!, its first compilation, which featured tracks pulled from its previous catalogue. The compilation was positively received with a review stating "Lil Chief Records is a label to keep on eye on." A second compilation, Greetings From New Zealand, followed in 2007.

By 2006 the roster had expanded to include artists such as Lawrence Arabia and his band The Reduction Agents, Shugo Tokumaru, and the band Voom. Radio New Zealand did a feature on the label in August 2006, when Andrew Clifford visited their Auckland headquarters.

In 2008 the label was written up in the UK's Sunday Times in the article ”New Zealand, pop Mecca? A new wave of bands is set to expand your horizons”. Also that year The Ruby Suns were named among the "best new music" in Pitchfork, while Lawrence Arabia toured with Feist.

In May 2012 the label released the compilation These Shaky Isles, with tracks going back ten years in its catalogue. As of 2013 label continues to release indie pop bands, such as the all-girl project The Gladeyes and Princess Chelsea.

== Artists ==
The following artists have released albums through Lil' Chief Records as of March 2019.

- Alec Bathgate
- Jonathan Bree
- The Brunettes
- Cool Rainbows
- Edmund Cake
- The Gladeyes
- Lawrence Arabia
- Little Pictures
- Mainard Larkin
- The Nudie Suits
- Pie Warmer
- Pikachunes
- Princess Chelsea
- The Reduction Agents
- The Ruby Suns
- Scott Mannion
- Shaft
- Sheep, Dog & Wolf
- Shugo Tokumaru
- The Tokey Tones
- Voom
- Wet Wings

== Discography ==
The following list is organized by catalog number, which is a roughly chronological number system established by the label.

No.	Artist	Title	Year
LCR001	The Brunettes	Holding Hands, Feeding Ducks	2002
LCR002	The Brunettes	The Boyracer e.p.	2003
LCR003	The Tokey Tones	Caterpillar	2003
LCR004	The Tokey Tones	Butterfly	2003
LCR005	The Nudie Suits	Songbook	2003
LCR006	Edmund Cake	Downtown Puff	2004
LCR007	The Brunettes	Mars Loves Venus	2004
LCR008	Shaft	Open Sesame	2004
LCR009	Alec Bathgate	The Indifferent Velvet Void	2004
LCR010	The Brunettes	When Ice Met Cream	2005
LCR011	The Ruby Suns	The Ruby Suns	2005
LCR012	Various artists	Now We Are Three!!!	2005
LCR013	The Nudie Suits	Sweetacres	2006
LCR014	The Reduction Agents	The Dance Reduction Agents	2006
LCR015	Lawrence Arabia	Lawrence Arabia	2006
LCR016	Voom	Hello, Are You There?	2006
LCR017	Shugo Tokumaru	L.S.T.	2006
LCR018	Shaft	Down At Your Life	2006
LCR019	The Brunettes	Structure & Cosmetics	2007
LCR020	The Ruby Suns	Lichen Ears EP	2008
LCR021	The Ruby Suns	Sea Lion	2008
LCR022	Little Pictures	Owl + Owl	2008
LCR023	Pie Warmer	The Fearsome Feeling	2009
LCR024	The Brunettes	The Red Rollerskates E.P.	2009
LCR025	The Brunettes	Paper Dolls	2009
LCR026	The Gladeyes	Psychosis of Love	2009
LCR027	The Ruby Suns	Fight Softly	2010
LCR028	Pikachunes	Pikachunes	2010
LCR029	The Eversons	The Eversons E.P.	2011
LCR030	Princess Chelsea	Lil' Golden Book	2011
LCR031	The Gladeyes	Shadows Explode	2011
LCR032	Wet Wings	Glory Glory	2011
LCR033	Cool Rainbows	Whale Rocket	2012
LCR034	The Eversons	Summer Feeling	2012
LCR035	The Eversons	With A Little Help From Our Friends	2012
LCR036	Pikachunes	Miles	2013
LCR037	The Ruby Suns	Christopher	2013
LCR038	Jonathan Bree	The Primrose Path	2013
LCR039	Sheep, Dog & Wolf	Egospect	2013
LCR040	The Icypoles	My World Was Made For You	2014
LCR041	Wet Wings	Willow Peak	2014
LCR043	Princess Chelsea	The Great Cybernetic Depression	2015
LCR044	Jonathan Bree	A Little Night Music	2015
LCR045	The Eversons	The Eversons present The Emilys: Super Awesome Cartoon Band	2015
LCR046	Various artists	Waiting For Your Love: A Tribute To The Reduction Agents	2016
LCR047	Princess Chelsea	Aftertouch	2016
LCR048	The Ruby Suns	Sprite Fountain	2017
LCR049	Jonathan Bree	Sleepwalking	2018
LCR050	Princess Chelsea	The Loneliest Girl	2018
LCR051	Scott Mannion	Loving Echoes	2019
LCR052	Jonathan Bree	After The Curtains Close	2020
LCR053	Princess Chelsea	Everything Is Going To Be Alright	2022
LCR054	Jonathan Bree	Pre-Code Hollywood	2023
LCR055	Princess Chelsea	Live at Studio Two	2026
LCR056	Jonathan Bree	Don't Call It Love	2026
LCR057	Mainard Larkin	Rattlesnake Boy	2026
LCR PROMO; 001	Various artists	Greetings From New Zealand	2007
LCR PROMO; 002	Various artists	These Shaky Isles	2012
