= When Ice Met Cream =

EP by The Brunettes
- Released: 1 April 2005
- Genre: Indie pop
- Length: 16:38
- Label: Lil' Chief Records
- Producer: Jonathan Bree

The Brunettes chronology
Mars Loves Venus (2004)	When Ice Met Cream (2005)	Structure & Cosmetics (2007)

When Ice Met Cream is an EP released by The Brunettes. It was released in 2005 by Lil' Chief Records.

== Track listing ==
1. "When Ice Met Cream" - 3:19
2. "Pink Ribbons" - 2:27
3. "Hulk is Hulk" - 3:21
4. "The Ace of Space" - 2:31
5. "The Outsider" - 2:37
6. "Goodnight Little Cherub Boy" - 2:26

== Personnel ==
- Jonathan Bree — Vocals, Guitar, Synthesizer, Percussion
- Heather Mansfield — Vocals, Keyboards, Glockenspiel, Clarinet, Harmonica
- James Milne — Backing vocals, Guitar, Percussion
- Ryan McPhun — Backing vocals
- Mike Hall — Bass, Whistle
- Kari Hammon — Drums
- Nick Harte — Drums
- Amee Robinson — Tenor sax
- Harry Cundy — Trumpet
