= Christopher (The Ruby Suns album) =

Studio album by The Ruby Suns
- Released: 29 January 2013
- Length: 41:20
- Label: Lil' Chief Records, Memphis Industries, Sub Pop
- Producer: Ryan McPhun

The Ruby Suns chronology
Fight Softly (2010)	Christopher (2013)	Sprite Fountain (2017)

Singles from Christopher
- 1. "Kingfisher Call Me" Released: 30 October 2012

Professional ratings
Aggregate scores
Source	Rating
Metacritic	54/100
Review scores
Source	Rating
AllMusic	3/5 stars
Clash	4/10
Consequence of Sound	D−
Drowned in Sound	7/10
MusicOMH	3.5/5 stars
NME	3/5 stars
Now	2/5 Ns
Pitchfork	5.8/10
PopMatters	4/10
Slant Magazine	2.5/5 stars

Christopher is the fourth studio album by New Zealand indie pop band The Ruby Suns. It was released 29 January 2013 by Sub Pop. It is the band's third since signing to US label Sub Pop.

== Production ==
Christopher was written, engineered and produced by lead vocalist Ryan McPhun, and mixed by American producer Chris Coady.

== Singles ==
The first single, "Kingfisher Call Me", was released on 30 October 2012. The music video was released on 12 December 2012.

The band released the music video "In Real Life" on 6 February 2013.

The music video to "Desert of Pop" was released on 21 February 2014, and directed by Samuel Kristofski.

== Critical reception ==
Christopher was met with "mixed or average" reviews from critics. At Metacritic, which assigns a weighted average rating using reviews from mainstream publications, this release received an average score of 54 based on 17 reviews.

In a review for AllMusic, critic Fred Thomas wrote: "There's a vague sense throughout the album that some hard-fought personal growth in McPhun's life is driving the dramatic shifts in this set of songs, but rarely are the tunes themselves direct enough to connect on the emotional levels they seem to be aiming for. That said, the occasional burst of incredible, disposable pop goes a long way, but sadly not long enough to make Christopher an entirely engaging experience." Gareth James of Clash called the release a "phenomenally uneventful album, with noodly synth bits and squelchy, meandering programmed drums beneath entirely forgettable, wafting vocals." At Consequence of Sound, Sasha Gefffen said: "Christopher's hyper-saturated synths sound less like a reverent throwback and more like Twin Shadow in an irradiated snow globe. The wallop that each chorus aspires to is tempered by sheer sonic clutter." Billy Hamilton of Drowned in Sound explained: "Despite the self-therapy and tonal lulls, Christopher is a highly listenable affair that produces two truly outstanding moments." Hamilton went on to call the release "a frustrating listen". NME reviewer Matthew Horton described Christopher as a "dreamy lushness with synths that range all the way from zappy to squashy."

Writing for PopMatters, writer David Grossman said: "The few peaks of Christopher are heavily outweighed by its deep valleys and plodding middle ground, which pass by without so much as a signpost of remembrance."

== Track listing ==
No.	Title	Length
1.	"Desert of Pop"	4:11
2.	"In Real Life"	4:07
3.	"Dramatikk"	3:57
4.	"Kingfisher Call Me"	4:20
5.	"Rush"	4:23
6.	"Jump In"	4:13
7.	"Boy"	3:54
8.	"Starlight"	4:25
9.	"Futon Fortress"	3:50
10.	"Heart Attack"	4:00
