= The Boyracer (EP) =

The Boyracer EP

EP by The Brunettes
- Released: 1 May 2003
- Genre: Indie pop
- Length: 19:29
- Label: Lil' Chief Records
- Producer: Jonathan Bree

The Brunettes chronology
Holding Hands, Feeding Ducks (2002)	The Boyracer EP (2003)	Mars Loves Venus (2004)

Alternative cover
- The original New Zealand release on Lil' Chief Records

The Boyracer e.p. is the second EP by The Brunettes. It was released in 2003 on Lil' Chief Records.

== Reception ==
The Boyracer e.p. garnered 3 and half stars out of 5 on Allmusic.

== Track listing ==
1. "Boyracer" – 3:22
2. "Lovers Park" – 3:00
3. "Vaudeville" – 3:24
4. "I Miss My Coochie Coo" – 3:10
5. "Don't Neglect Your Pet" – 3:03
6. "Maybe White Palisades" – 3:30

== Personnel ==
- Jonathan Bree — Vocals, Guitar, Synthesizer, Bass, Drum machine
- Heather Mansfield — Vocals, Glockenspiel, Piano, Harmonica, Organ, Xylophone
- James Milne — Guitar, Piano, Harmonium, Beat-boxing, Backing vocals
- Kari Hammond — Drums, Percussion
- Gerald Stewart — Electric bass guitar, Backing vocals
