= Randa (rapper) =

- Also known as: Larz Randa; Mainard Larkin
- Genres: Rap; Hip Hop
- Years active: 2012–present

Mainard Larkin (better known by his stage names Randa and Larz Randa) is a rapper and recording artist.

Randa is best known for the songs "Heatwave" and "Rangers." "Heatwave was written with Shannon Fowler (aka Tom Lark) and Merk (musician) (aka Mark Perkins). "Rangers" was written with Josh Fountain, who subsequently became one of New Zealand's most successful producers through his work with Leisure (band) and Benee. 'Rangers' was used on a TV health promotion ad in New Zealand called "Go the distance", which was a marketing campaign that aimed to contribute to changing New Zealanders alcohol consumption behaviour from the current norm of high-risk drinking to one of moderation. One of Randa's early breakthroughs was winning the Critic's Choice Award at the 2014 New Zealand Music Awards. That same year, he also performed at the Auckland Big Day Out 2014 which had major international acts at the same festival including Snoop Dogg, Pearl Jam and Arcade Fire. This was considered in the top 20 moments of the festivals history in New Zealand Randa would also perform at the major event Big Gay Out in 2020, which had acts like Mika X and Courtney Act.

In 2018, Randa was featured on an Air New Zealand safety video alongside Julian Dennison, Kings and Theia. In the video, the New Zealand musicians were rapping and singing to a song they created called "It's Kiwi Safety". The music adapts two songs, Run-DMC's "It's Tricky" and "In the Neighbourhood" by Sisters Underground. The video was retired by Air New Zealand after only three months due to public criticism.

In 2026, Mainard Larkin released an Alternative country album Rattlesnake Boy under his own name, working in collaboration with his longtime producer Shannon Fowler (aka Tom Lark).

== Personal life ==
Randa was educated at Carmel College, Auckland, for their high school years. Randa started making music while living briefly in Sydney, Australia, in 2011. Randa studied at MAINZ which is a program part of Tai Poutini Polytechnic.

Randa identifies as a Trans man.

== Nominations and awards ==
- 2013 RIANZ New Zealand Music Awards – Best Music Video - Frankenstein (Nominated)
- 2014 RIANZ New Zealand Music Awards – Critics’ Choice prize (Winner)
- 2019 RIANZ New Zealand Music Awards – Best Music Video - Rock Bottom (Winner)

== Discography ==
Randa discography
- EPs: 3
- Singles: 9
- Music videos: 8

=== EPs ===
Year	Title	Details
2012	Lunch Box	Released: June 2012
2013	Summer Camp	Released: October 2013
2014	Rangers	Released: October 2, 2014
2020	Heatwave	Released: March 28, 2020

=== Single ===
Year	Title	Album
2013	Orange Juice	Summer Camp EP
2013	Frankenstein	Summer Camp EP
2014	Cosby Kid	Non-album single
2015	Rangers	Rangers EP
2015	Lifeguard	Rangers EP
2015	Apollo Creed	Rangers EP
2015	Turtles	Non-album single
2017	Fashion	Non-album single
2017	Angel Boy	Non-album single
2019	Rock Bottom	Non-album single
2019	Toughen Up	Non-album single

=== Featured artist ===
Year	Title	Artist	Album
2016	Yes (feat Heavy & Randa)	Yoko-Zuna	Luminols

=== Music videos ===
Year	Title	Album
2013	Orange Juice	Summer Camp EP
2013	Frankenstein	Summer Camp EP
2014	Cosby Kid	Non-album single
2015	Rangers	Rangers EP
2015	Lifeguard	Rangers EP
2015	Turtles	Non-album single
2017	Apollo Creed	Rangers EP
2019	Fashion	Non-album single
