= Fight Softly =

Studio album by The Ruby Suns
- Released: 15 February 2010

The Ruby Suns chronology
Sea Lion (2008)	Fight Softly (2010)	Christopher (2013)

Professional ratings
Review scores
Source	Rating
Allmusic	4/5 stars
The A.V. Club	(A−) link
BBC	(very positive) link
Pitchfork Media	(6.1/10) link
Slant Magazine	3.5/5 stars

Fight Softly is the third full-length album released by the New Zealand based band The Ruby Suns.

== Track listing ==
All tracks are written by Ryan McPhun.

No.	Title	Length
1.	"Sun Lake Rinsed"	3:49
2.	"Mingus And Pike"	4:38
3.	"Cinco"	4:19
4.	"Cranberry"	4:52
5.	"Closet Astrologer"	5:40
6.	"Haunted House"	2:39
7.	"How Kids Fail"	5:22
8.	"Dusty Fruit"	3:56
9.	"Two Humans"	4:56
10.	"Olympics On Pot"	4:49

== Release details ==
Release format	Label	Country	Cat. No.	Release date
CD	Lil' Chief Records	New Zealand	LCR 027	15 February 2010
CD	Memphis Industries	United Kingdom/Europe	MI0150CD	1 March 2010
CD/LP	Sub Pop	North America/Japan	SP863	2 March 2010
