= The Nudie Suits =

- Origin: New Zealand
- Genres: Indie pop
- Years active: 1992–2006
- Labels: Lil' Chief Records

The Nudie Suits were a New Zealand band consisting of Mark Lyons (vocals, guitar) and sisters Dionne Taylor (steel guitar, harmony vocals, autoharp) and Tam Taylor (violin). They began their career in Auckland but relocated to Melbourne for a few years in the early 2000s. The band released two albums on Lil' Chief Records.

The Nudie Suits debut album Songbook received some excellent reviews and was described as "Something of tremendous, charm and enormous vitality." by Chris Knox of Real Groove Magazine.

Their follow-up album, Sweetacres, was a concept album based on Lyons' childhood in an Auckland suburb and was said to "exude(s) the vintage charm and warm glow of an antique valve radio", according to Russel Baillie from The New Zealand Herald. A third Nudie Suits album was announced in 2008, to feature a new rhythm section of Rob Collins (bass) and Ivan Hyphen Johnston (drums), but has not, to present, eventuated.

== Discography ==
Date	Title	Label	Catalog Number
Albums
2003	Songbook	Lil' Chief Records	LCR 005
2006	Sweetacres	Lil' Chief Records	LCR 013
