= Holding Hands, Feeding Ducks =

Studio album by The Brunettes
- Released: 2002
- Genre: Indie pop
- Length: 37:18
- Label: Lil' Chief Records
- Producer: Jonathan Bree

The Brunettes chronology
Mars Loves Venus EP (1998)	Holding Hands, Feeding Ducks (2002)	The Boyracer e.p. (2003)

Professional ratings
Review scores
Source	Rating
AllMusic	link
New Zealand Herald	link

Holding Hands, Feeding Ducks is the first full-length album released by twee pop group the Brunettes. It was released in 2002 as a joint release between Lil' Chief Records and EMI New Zealand.

== Track listing ==
All songs written by Jonathan Bree.

1. "The Moon in June Stuff" – 2:32
2. "Cupid" – 3:03
3. "Holding Hands, Feeding Ducks" – 4:05
4. "Talk to Jesus" – 3:17
5. "Dancefloor" – 2:47
6. "Summer Love" – 2:31
7. "Super Eight" – 3:22
8. "Jukebox" – 3:07
9. "Mafioso" – 3:15
10. "End of the Runway" – 3:32
11. "Cotton Candy" – 3:42
12. "Tell Her" – 2:01

== Personnel ==
- Jonathan Bree — vocals, guitar, synthesizer
- Heather Mansfield — vocals, glockenspiel, harmonica, marimba, organ, piano
- Mike Hall — bass, flute, harmonium, vocals
- Kari Hammond — drums, percussion
