= The Reduction Agents =

New Zealand band

- Origin: New Zealand
- Genres: Indie pop
- Labels: Lil' Chief; Honorary Bedouin

The Reduction Agents were a New Zealand band fronted by James Milne, who also records under the name Lawrence Arabia. In 2006, the band released their debut and only album The Dance Reduction Agents. In the same year, Milne released his debut solo album, Lawrence Arabia. Both albums were nominated for several bNet awards, New Zealand's public voted alternative radio awards.

Milne has been involved in the internationally successful pop group The Brunettes and toured as bass player for American band Okkervil River. He has also produced music for film and theater, and two Reduction Agents songs appear in the soundtrack to the 2007 film Eagle vs Shark.

== Solo discography ==
Date	Title	Label	Catalog Number
Albums
2006	The Dance Reduction Agents	Lil' Chief Records; Honorary Bedouin Records	LCR 014; HBED 001
