= Stuart Page =

New Zealand photographer, designer, filmmaker and drummer

Stuart Page (born 2 November 1957) is a New Zealand photographer, designer, filmmaker and drummer.

== Early life and education ==
Page was born on 2 November 1957.

He graduated from Ilam School of Fine Arts in Christchurch with a Diploma in Fine Arts (Hons) in Photography in 1980.

== Work ==
Page has worked with artists on the Flying Nun label and many lesser known counterculture groups of his country.

After travel to U.S.A. (May-Nov 1982) his screenprinting work took on a new vigour that brought him into contact with many lo-fi music groups. Apart from his photography and printing work, his main concern has been documentary film-making and his music group The Axemen. He has produced and directed over forty 16mm and digital music videos & shot several 16mm and digital short films and digital video documentaries, as well as 16mm and 35mm TVCs.

His work is held in collections of Museum of New Zealand, Auckland Art Gallery, Christchurch Art Gallery Te Puna o Waiwhetū, Dunedin Public Art Gallery, Museum of Modern Art N.Y.C., Auckland Public Library, Auckland School of Architecture, Dowse Gallery, Manawatu Art Gallery, and others.

== Awards ==
In 2009 his documentary film Shustak won "Best New Zealand Feature Documentary" award, and he was awarded "Best Emerging New Zealand Film-Maker" at the 2009 DocNZ International Film Festival Awards. An eight–page photographic portfolio of NZ Rock 'n Roll appeared in Landfall 219.

Page was awarded a "Prix Spécial du Jury" at FIFO 2017 (Festival International du Film Documentaire Océanien) for the 52-minute documentary How Bizarre - The Story of an Otara Millionaire. "This is the story of Paul Fuemana, the Māori/Niuean artist who shot to fame in 1995 with the song that was New Zealand's biggest selling record."

== Sources ==
- 'How Bizarre' doco streamable full version at Māori Television
- Stuart Page at NZ on Screen
