= Sheep, Dog & Wolf =

New Zealand musician

- Born: Daniel McBride
- Origin: Auckland, New Zealand
- Genres: Experimental; alternative rock; indie folk; jazz
- Occupations: Musician; composer
- Years active: 2011–present
- Label: Aphrodite
- Website: sheepdogandwolf.com

Daniel McBride, better known under the moniker Sheep, Dog & Wolf, is a multi-instrumentalist, vocalist, and composer based in Auckland, New Zealand. McBride released his first EP under this name (created in his bedroom) independently in May 2011, at 17 years old. He was signed to Lil' Chief Records for his debut studio album; Egospect, released August 2013. His second studio album Two-Minds was released on April 9, 2021, through independent London record label Aphrodite.

== Music and career ==
The music of Sheep, Dog & Wolf is characterised by its often-dense instrumentation, unusual time signatures, McBride's use of vocal layering and harmonisation, and his 'bedroom artist' approach to recording and engineering. Notably, all releases are performed, recorded, and produced by McBride.

=== Releases and reception ===
Sheep, Dog & Wolf's debut EP, Ablutophobia, was released in May 2011, and was highly praised internationally; he was named "a young Sufjan Stevens" in the Guardian and Vogue Italia called the EP "a rare pearl."

McBride released his debut full-length album, Egospect, through Lil' Chief Records in August 2013. The album was one of eight finalists for the Taite Music Prize for Best New Zealand Album, alongside Lorde and Unknown Mortal Orchestra.

Sheep, Dog & Wolf was awarded the Critics' Choice Prize at the 2013 New Zealand Music Awards.

McBride's second album, Two-Minds, was released on April 9, 2021, through Aphrodite. NPR described the record as "lush and textured... so beautiful" and named it one of their top albums of the week, and Clash magazine called it "truly intoxicating... a beautiful evocation of the need to walk towards positivity, a yearning for new light."

Two-Minds was one of eight finalists for the Taite Music Prize for Best New Zealand Album at the 2022 Taite Awards.

== Discography ==
=== Albums ===
- Egospect (2013)
- Two-Minds (2021)

=== EPs ===
- Ablutophobia EP (2011)
