= The Tokey Tones =

- Origin: New Zealand
- Genre: Indie pop
- Years active: 2002–present
- Label: Lil' Chief Records

The Tokey Tones are a band led by Scott Mannion, formerly of Auckland indie pop bands Polaar and Plasticene. The Tokey Tones are primarily a studio-based band, the other long-time key member being Li Ming Hu, who is more widely known for her role as Li-Mei on the long running New Zealand soap opera Shortland Street. When playing live, The Tokey Tones rely on a revolving cast of musicians from other Lil' Chief Records bands, including The Brunettes and The Ruby Suns. The band has been described as "sticky-sweet indie-with-electronics group with very strong melodies and melt-in-your-ear vocals".

== Discography ==
Date	Title	Label	Catalog Number
Albums
2003	Caterpillar	Lil' Chief Records	LCR 003
2003	Butterfly	Lil' Chief Records	LCR 004
