= The Ruby Suns =

New Zealand indie pop group

The Ruby Suns (Ryan McPhun & The Ruby Suns)
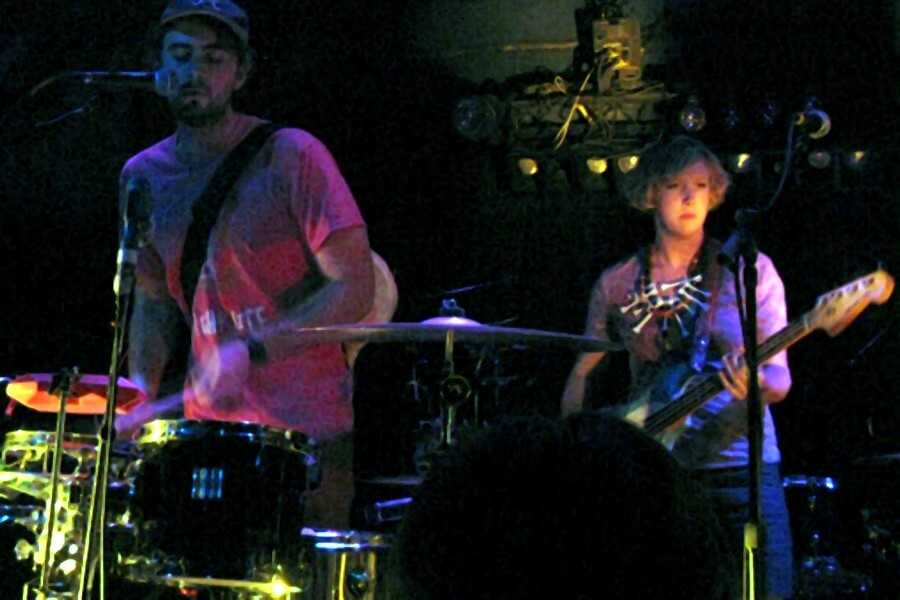
- The Ruby Suns performing in 2008

Background information
- Origin: New Zealand
- Genres: Indie pop
- Years active: 2003–present
- Labels: Lil' Chief; Memphis Industries; Sub Pop; Academy Fight Song
- Website: The Ruby Suns

The Ruby Suns are an indie pop group from New Zealand. They formed in 2004 when Californian Ryan McPhun moved to Auckland and started playing in several bands such as the Brunettes, the Tokey Tones, and the Reduction Agents.

== Biography ==
The Ruby Suns are signed to Lil' Chief Records in New Zealand and Memphis Industries in Britain. In early 2007, the band embarked on their first European tour in support of their self-titled debut album. In the latter half of 2007, the band toured with the Shins extensively throughout Australia.

In 2007, the Ruby Suns signed to American record label Sub Pop for the US and Asia. The band released their second album, Sea Lion, in January 2008. Later that year, the band recorded the song "Don't Touch the Dusty Fruit" to the Survival International charity album, Songs for Survival, and the song "Oh, Mojave" was used in the Windows Vista commercial for the Mojave Experiment.

In August 2008, The Ruby Suns contributed their track "There Are Birds" to an indie compilation album Indiecater Vol. 2.

The Ruby Suns' third album is titled Fight Softly and was released on 2 March 2010.

The band's fourth album Christopher was released on 29 January 2013.

McPhun had moved to Oslo, Norway by the time he recorded the band's fifth album, Sprite Fountain, which was released on 9 June 2017.

== Discography ==
=== Albums ===
- The Ruby Suns (2005) Lil' Chief Records
- Sea Lion (2008) Lil' Chief Records
- Fight Softly (2010)
- Christopher (2013)
- Sprite Fountain (2017)

=== EPs ===
- XFM Sessions (2007)
- Lichen Ears EP (2007) Lil' Chief Records
