= Bressa Creeting Cake =

1990s New Zealand rock band

- Also known as: Breast Secreting Cake
- Origin: New Zealand
- Genres: alternative, pop
- Years active: 1991–1999
- Labels: Flying Nun Records
- Members: Edmund 'Cake' McWilliams; Joel 'Bressa' Wilton; Geoff 'Creeting' Maddock
- Past members: Dave Nielsen; Jared Johansen; Rachael King; Karl Harris

Bressa Creeting Cake is a New Zealand rock band, active since the 1990s.

== History ==
The band, originally named Breast Secreting Cake, formed in Auckland around 1991 around the nucleus of Edmund Cake, Geoff Maddock and Joel Wilton. Edmund, Geoff and Joel had played together on songs while they were at school, but the first line up to gig and release music included Dave Neilsen. The band's first recordings were made by Ed on four tracks and Ed and Dave at a 16-track studio the band was lent. A few of these songs were being played on university radio station bFM by 1994, and the band had found an audience. They played live irregularly, and mostly with a completely different set of songs from the previous show. Often they played in costumes that made them appear as monks. At the request of Flying Nun Records' parent company Mushroom Records, the band changed its name to Bressa Creeting Cake and McWilliams, Maddock and Wilton each took on a part of that name as their own stage name.

By the time the band recorded its first EP and album in 1996/7 Dave Neilsen had left and they had played live for a time with Jared Johansen and Rachael King on the bass. but the record was made by the original three members only.

The music for this album was mostly recorded at a studio at Cheltenham Beach on Auckland's North Shore owned by Joe Gubay, a musician and fastidious collector of vintage audio equipment. Some recordings were also done at Revolver studios and York St 'B' studio on Shortland st. The album was produced by Edmund Cake and engineered by Edmund and Joe. Through this period the band played live rarely.

By 1999, the band had ended, with Maddock and Wilton playing in an early line-up of Goldenhorse.

In November 2009, a reformed Bressa Creeting Cake played a limited number of shows across New Zealand, supported by Pie Warmer (featuring Edmund Cake).
