= Lawrence Arabia =

New Zealand musician

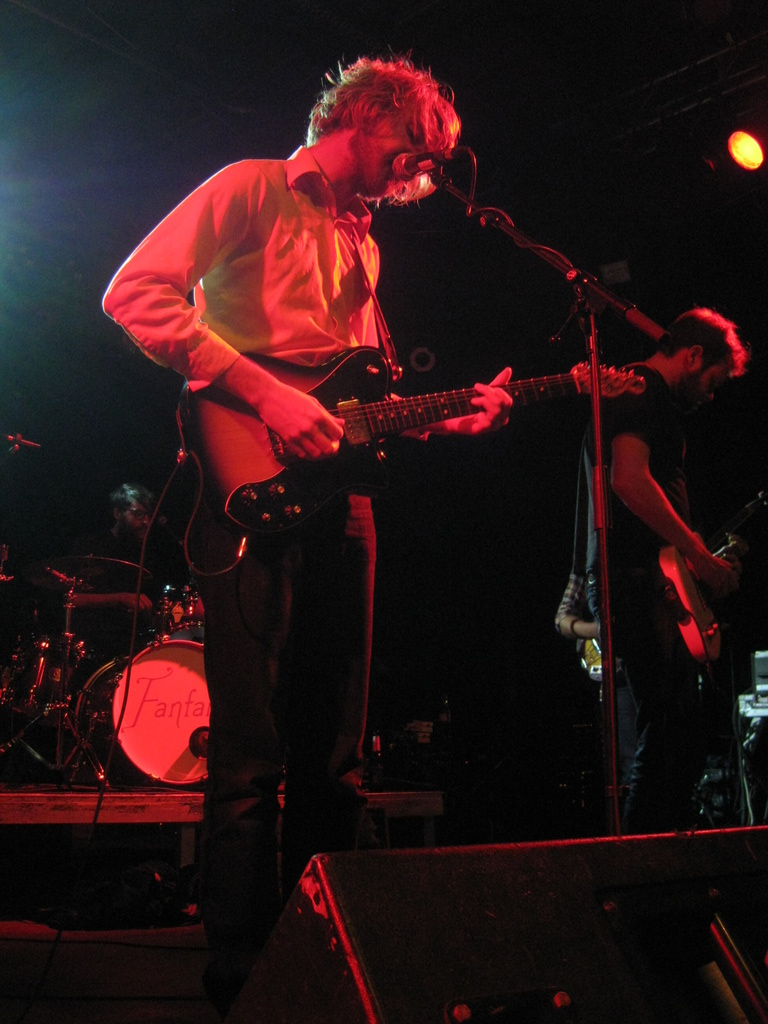
- Lawrence Arabia in 2010

Background information
- Born: James Milne; Christchurch, New Zealand
- Genre: Indie pop
- Years active: 2003–present
- Labels: Honorary Bedouin; Lil' Chief; Bella Union; Flying Nun
- Formerly of: The Reduction Agents
- Website: www.lawrencearabia.com

Lawrence Arabia is the musical guise of New Zealand artist and composer James Milne.

In 2006, Lawrence Arabia released his self-titled debut album and the debut album from his band The Reduction Agents, The Dance Reduction Agents. Both albums were nominated for several bNet awards, New Zealand's public voted alternative radio awards.

In 2009 he released his sophomore solo album Chant Darling, recorded between London and Sweden, which resulted in an APRA Silver Scroll Award for the song "Apple Pie Bed" (with co-writer, The Phoenix Foundation's Lukasz Buda). In 2010 Chant Darling was awarded the inaugural Taite Music Prize.

In August 2009, Lawrence performed with a new band called BARB on a New Zealand tour, with a band consisting of Connan Mockasin, Liam Finn, Eliza Jane Barnes, Seamus Ebbs, Jol Mulholland and Wild Bill Rickets. Their album (recorded at Roundhead Studios in Auckland) was released 10 August 2010.

In October 2011 he released another collaborative album with Mike Fabulous (The Black Seeds, Lord Echo), Unlimited Buffet, with Fabulous composing the instrumentals and Milne the vocal melodies and lyrics.

In July 2012, Lawrence Arabia released his third album titled The Sparrow. The same album won a VNZMA for Best Male Solo Artist in 2013, and was one of seven finalists in the 2013 Taite Music Prize.

His fourth album, Absolute Truth, was recorded with Mike Fabulous in the Hutt Valley, Wellington and was released by Flying Nun Records in July 2016. It was nominated for Best Alternative Album and Best Male Solo artist at the 2016 VNZMAs and won Best Alternative Album. The artwork by Anns Taylor won a 2016 VNZMA for best album cover.

In 2019 he released fifth album Singles Club made up of 12 songs written, recorded and released one a month between 27 January 2018 and 25 December 2018. This album was one of ten finalists for the 2020 Taite Music Prize.

He has toured extensively throughout Australia, North America and Europe, including shows with Feist, Beach House, and Crowded House.

Milne has been a member of the pop group The Brunettes and has toured as bass player for American band Okkervil River. He has also produced music for film and theatre including songs that appeared in Taika Waititi's film Eagle vs Shark.

== Solo discography ==
Date	Title	Label	Catalog number
Albums
2006	Lawrence Arabia	Honorary Bedouin Records; Lil' Chief Records	HBED 002; LCR 015
2009	Chant Darling	Honorary Bedouin Records	HBED 002; LCR 015
2012	The Sparrow	Bella Union	
2016	Absolute Truth	Flying Nun Records	
2019	Singles Club	Honorary Bedouin Records	
