= Mars Loves Venus =

Studio album by The Brunettes
- Released: July 24, 2004
- Genre: Indie pop
- Length: 36:09
- Label: Lil' Chief Records
- Producer: Jonathan Bree

The Brunettes chronology
The Boyracer e.p. (2002)	Mars Loves Venus (2004)	When Ice Met Cream (2005)

Professional ratings
Review scores
Source	Rating
AllMusic	4/5 stars
The New Zealand Herald	4/5 stars

Mars Loves Venus is the second full-length album by The Brunettes. It was released in 2004 on Lil' Chief Records.

== Track listing ==
1. "Mars Loves Venus" – 2:25
2. "Loopy Loopy Love" – 2:44
3. "Polyester Meets Acetate" – 3:56
4. "Too Big for Gidget" – 3:18
5. "Whale in the Sand" – 2:45
6. "You Beautiful Militant" – 4:14
7. "The Record Store" – 2:58
8. "These Things Take Time" – 2:48
9. "Best Friend Envy" – 3:12
10. "No Regrets" – 2:08
11. "Leonard Says" – 2:13
12. "Your Heart Dies" – 3:22

== Personnel ==
- Jonathan Bree — Vocals, Guitar, Banjo, Sitar, Synthesizer, Optigan, Drum machine, Percussion
- Heather Mansfield — Vocals, Organs, Piano, Harmonica, Clarinet, Glockenspiel
- James Milne — Guitar, Bass, Backing vocals, Chamberlin, Vibraphone, Percussion
- Ryan McPhun — Drums, Percussion, Backing vocals
- Nick Harte — Drums
