= The Brunettes =

New Zealand pop band

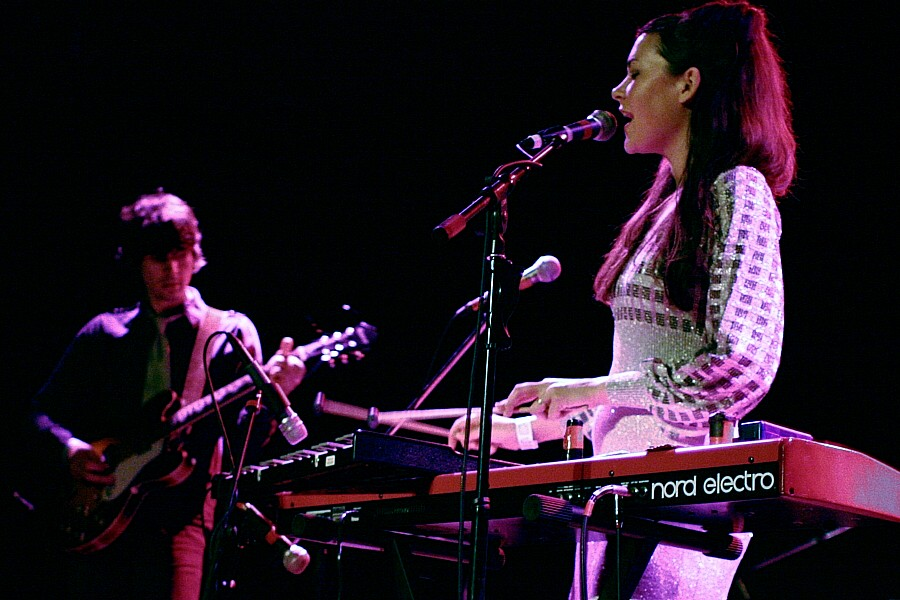
- The Brunettes, 2007

Background information
- Origin: Auckland, New Zealand
- Genres: Indie pop, twee pop
- Years active: 1998–2009
- Labels: Lil' Chief Records; Sub Pop
- Past members: Jonathan Bree; Heather Mansfield; James Milne; Ryan McPhun; Harry Cundy; Andrew Thompson; Chelsea Nikkel

The Brunettes were an indie pop group from New Zealand formed in 1998 and lasting until 2009. The group consisted of core members Jonathan Bree and Heather Mansfield, with additional contributions from part-time members such as Ryan McPhun and Chelsea Nikkel. The group had released several well-received albums such as Holding Hands, Feeding Ducks (2002), which received 4.5/5 stars from AllMusic. Signed to Lil' Chief Records, they had opened for bands such as Rilo Kiley and Beirut.

== History ==
The Brunettes were formed in Auckland in 1998 by Jonathan Bree and Heather Mansfield. According to Bree, "I heard Heather’s voice before I met her. My cousin had recorded her band Yoko and I thought she had a great natural voice, no silly affected delivery. I was looking for a girl to sing on some duets I had written so I tracked down her number and asked her to come see my band play."

The band independently released its first recording Mars Loves Venus EP in 1998. In 2002 Bree founded Lil' Chief Records with fellow indie pop musician Scott Mannion of The Tokey Tones. The two men had met that year in Marbecks Record Store in Auckland, where Bree was working at the time.

The Brunettes' album Holding Hands, Feeding Ducks released in 2002 was the debut release for the label. This was followed 6 months later by the mini-album The Boyracer EP. The label set up headquarters in an Auckland flat dubbed 'The Ghetto.' Its rooms and graffiti-lined garage became a regular rehearsal space for the band, as well as a recording studio for many of the band's future releases.

Their second album Mars Loves Venus was released in June 2004 again on Lil' Chief and was quickly followed by 2005's EP When Ice Met Cream. In 2004, Ryan McPhun moved to Auckland from California and started playing in The Brunettes and other Lil' Chief bands.

The group opened for The Shins 2005 tour of North America. They have also opened for Rilo Kiley, The Postal Service, Broken Social Scene, Clap Your Hands Say Yeah, and Beirut and played at the 2006 Big Day Out festivals in New Zealand and Australia.

Their album Structure & Cosmetics was released on 30 July 2007 in New Zealand and on 7 August in the US, on Sub Pop. "Brunettes Against Bubblegum Youth" was featured on an extended advertisement for Hollyoaks, on Channel 4 (and E4) in the UK.

In 2008, The Brunettes covered The Cure's "Lovesong" for American Laundromat Records tribute compilation Just Like Heaven – a tribute to The Cure. The Wedding Present, Joy Zipper, The Submarines, and The Rosebuds also contributed tracks to the project.

In 2009, The Brunettes released the Red Rollerskates EP on Lil' Chief Records, which was shortly followed by their fourth album, Paper Dolls. However, the band broke up later that year.

In 2010, their song "Red Rollerskates" was included on the soundtrack of the 2K Sports video game NBA 2K11.

== Members ==
Permanent

- Jonathan Bree – vocals, guitar, synthesizer (1998–2009)
- Heather Mansfield – vocals, glockenspiel, harmonica, marimba, organ, piano, etc. (1998–2009)

Rotating

- Ryan McPhun – Drums, Percussion, Backing vocals (2004–2009)
- James Milne (Lawrence Arabia) – Guitar, Bass, Backing vocals, Chamberlin, Vibraphone, Percussion, etc.
- Andrew Thompson
- Chelsea Nikkel (2009)

Previous

- Kari Hammond – Drums, Percussion (2003)
- Gerald Stewart – Electric Bass Guitar, Backing vocals (2003)
- Mike Hall – Bass, Flute, Harmonium, Vocals (2002)
- Harry Cundy
- Nick Harte - Drums

== Discography ==
=== Albums ===
- 1998: Mars Loves Venus EP
- 2002: Holding Hands, Feeding Ducks (Lil' Chief Records)
- 2003: The Boyracer e.p. (Lil' Chief Records)
- 2004: Mars Loves Venus (Lil' Chief Records)
- 2005: When Ice Met Cream E.P. (Lil' Chief Records)
- 2007: Structure & Cosmetics (Lil' Chief Records, Sub Pop)
- 2009: Paper Dolls (Lil' Chief Records)
- 2009: The Red Rollerskates E.P. (Lil' Chief Records)
- 2011: Mars Loves Venus (vinyl) (Microfiche Records, MFR 003)

=== Compilations ===
- "Lovesong" by The Cure on Just Like Heaven – a tribute to The Cure (American Laundromat Records)
