= The Mint Chicks discography =

- Studio albums: 3
- Extended plays: 4
- Singles: 17

The Mint Chicks were a New Zealand experimental noise rock/power pop band, active from 2001 to 2010, originally based in Auckland and later in Portland, USA. They were winners of several New Zealand Music Awards. Their output includes three studio albums, four EPs, and 17 singles.

== Albums ==
=== Studio albums ===
Year	Album details
2005	Fuck the Golden Youth: First studio album; Label: Flying Nun Records
2006	Crazy? Yes! Dumb? No!: Second studio album; Label: Flying Nun Records
2009	Screens: Third studio album; Label: Flying Nun Records

=== Extended plays ===
Year	Album details
2003	Octagon, Octagon, Octagon: First extended play; Label: Flying Nun Records
2004	Anti-Tiger: Second extended play; Label: Flying Nun Records
2008	Mintunes: Third extended play; Label: Flying Nun Records
2010	Bad Buzz: Fourth extended play; Label: MusicHy.pe

== Singles ==
Year	Single	Album
2003	"Post No Bills"	Octagon, Octagon, Octagon
2004	"Blue Team Go!"	Anti-Tiger
2004	"Opium of the People"	Anti-Tiger
2005	"Fuck the Golden Youth"	Fuck the Golden Youth
2005	"I Don't Want to Grow Old"	Fuck the Golden Youth
2005	"Take It, I Don't Want It"	Fuck the Golden Youth
2007	"Crazy? Yes! Dumb? No!"	Crazy? Yes! Dumb? No!
2007	"Welcome to Nowhere"	Crazy? Yes! Dumb? No!
2007	"Sleeping During the Day"	Crazy? Yes! Dumb? No!
2007	"Walking Off a Cliff Again"	Crazy? Yes! Dumb? No!
2008	"If My Arm Was a Mic Stand, Would You Hold My Hand?"	Crazy? Yes! Dumb? No!
2008	"She's Back on Crack"	Crazy? Yes! Dumb? No!
2009	"Life Will Get Better Some Day"	Screens
2009	"I Can't Stop Being Foolish"	Screens
2009	"Hot on Your Heels"	Screens
2009	"Don't Sell Your Brain Out, Baby"	Screens
2009	"She's a Mod"	Non-album single
