= Personal Computer (album) =

2015 album by Silicon

- Standard album cover

Studio album by Silicon
- Released: August 28, 2015
- Genre: Electronica, electro-funk, downtempo
- Length: 29:12
- Label: Domino Recording Company (Weird World)

Singles from Personal Computer
- 1. "God Emoji" Released: 10 April 2015; 2. "Burning Sugar" Released: 25 June 2015

Personal Computer is the debut studio album by Silicon, a solo project of New Zealand musician Kody Nielson, released in August 2015. The album marks Nielson's first time performing as Silicon and his first solo album as a singer-songwriter since the hiatus of his previous bands, Opossom and The Mint Chicks.

In New Zealand, Personal Computer peaked at 22 on the top 40 album charts in 2015, and spent 5 weeks on the top 20 Aotearoa albums charts, peaking at 4. The album won the Taite Music Prize in 2016.

Personal Computer received generally positive reviews from critics, who complimented its experimental electronic fusion of soul, funk, and disco elements, as well as its retro influences and overall theme.

== Background ==
Nielson previously fronted The Mint Chicks with his brother, Ruban Nielson. In 2010, the band came to an end and Ruban left to pursue his new project, Unknown Mortal Orchestra. In response, Nielson started a new group named Opossom with his partner Bic Runga and former bandmate Michael Logie.

After debuting with their album Electric Hawaii in 2012, the new group was unable to evolve into a full-time act due to Runga's own career and the couple's commitments to their three children. Nielson decided to continue in music with his own solo projects, releasing Devils (2013), a 6-track instrumental album quietly published on Bandcamp. Following the album, Nielson adopted the pseudonym Silicon. A year before the release of Personal Computer, Nielson also reunited with his brother and assisted with Unknown Mortal Orchestra's album Multi-Love (2015).

Nielson regards Silicon as his first true solo project. It followed a period of working with other artists as a producer, which inspired him to undertake a simpler approach with the production of Personal Computer. Initially, Nielson went through a period of losing interest in music, and began painting in his studio, developing the emoji design that would become part of the album.

== Composition and themes ==
Personal Computer combines aspects of electro-funk and disco, as well as experimental electronic elements, with retro sounds. It has been described as "noir-electronica" and "parodic" soul and funk.

The album draws from themes of digital mass production and loneliness despite hyperconnectivity. In an interview with The Sydney Morning Herald, Nielson said he wanted to write about technology, and was interested in the idea of isolation as people become more digitally connected; "we're all just sitting alone at our computers, or even when we're together, we're still just staring down at our phones".

The album artwork resembles an emoji with an ambiguous expression, and is based on a series of paintings by Nielson.

== Promotion ==
The CD edition includes a booklet with 29 of the original paintings by Nielson.

Nielson painted a series of 40 emoji artworks on canvas, and exhibited 29 of them in New York and London, to be put on sale following the release of the album. According to Nielson, each painting is intentionally similar to reflect a process of "mass production", and was used as a basis to form the album artwork. While the standard cover of the album uses a gray version of the emoji painting, some of the other images were repurposed as bonus content; in the original CD, an additional booklet is included with 29 of the paintings.

Two music videos were released in anticipation of the new album. The video for "God Emoji" was directed by Sam Peacocke and released on 7 May 2015, and depicts an extraterrestrial figure playing the drums, with shots of Nielson vaping in a tub, and a low-poly representation of his head floating through an urban environment. The second video was co-directed by Nielson and Ralph Brown, showing a series of retro-futuristic objects against a minimalist background, along with the figure from the "God Emoji" video and the emoji from the album artwork.

== Critical reception ==
Professional ratings
Aggregate scores
Source	Rating
AnyDecentMusic?	6.5/10
Metacritic	66/100
Review scores
Source	Rating
AllMusic	3.5/5 stars
PopMatters	6/10
The New Zealand Herald	5/5 stars
Stuff	4.5/5 stars
Otago Daily Times	4/5 stars
The Line of Best Fit	7/10

Personal Computer was met with mostly positive reviews from music critics. On Metacritic, it has a weighted average score of 66 out of 100 based on 6 reviews, indicating "generally favorable reviews".

Janne Oinonen of The Line of Best Fit rated the album 7/10, describing it as a promising debut that is "restlessly bubbling" and "truly arresting", but criticised the second half of the album for losing pace with "one too many hazy, half-formed slow jams". Shane Gilchrist of The Otago Daily Times rated the album 4/5 and praised it as a "masterclass in Nielson's dexterous, assured and adventurous musicality." Timothy Monger of AllMusic gave the album 3.5/5, describing the album as "an austere bit of noir-electronica with dashes of clever pop color" and writing "for the most part, Silicon works, delivering strange sonic pop candy that feels a bit too distant to warm the heart, yet is strangely comforting in its isolation."

Reviewers commented on the short length of the album but praised the experimental electronic elements and electro-funk sound, contrasting the release against Nielson's work with Unknown Mortal Orchestra, as well comparing aspects of the musical style to Tame Impala, Kraftwerk, Django Django and Stereolab. However, the track "Little Dancing Baby" was particularly critiqued; Oinonen wrote that the track is "totally charming or dangerously irritating, depending on the listener's mood." Similarly, Josh Gray of The Quietus wrote that the vocal sample used in the track "could give many a PC musician a run for their money in a contest of irritation inducement", but praised the project overall, concluding that "Silicon manages to convey more straight-up soul using nothing but his laptop than many multi-member collectives manage over their whole careers".

== Track listing ==
No.	Title	Length
1.	"Personal Computer"	3:05
2.	"Cellphone"	2:44
3.	"Submarine"	3:13
4.	"God Emoji"	2:41
5.	"Burning Sugar"	3:27
6.	"Little Dancing Baby"	1:08
7.	"I Can See Paradise"	2:06
8.	"Love Peace"	2:50
9.	"Blow"	3:53
10.	"Dope"	4:05
Total length:		29:12

== Personnel ==
Adapted from the album credits and CD booklet. The project was primarily a solo effort by Nielson, but features Runga performing backing vocals on "Blow", selected guitar by his brother Ruban, and brass samples on "Dope" by his father.

- Kody Nielson – composer, bass, drums, guitar, keyboards, producer, vocals, mixing, artwork
- Bic Runga – background vocals
- Chris Nielson – flugelhorn, soprano saxophone
- Ruban Nielson – guitar
- Brian Gardner – mastering

== Charts ==
Chart (2015)	Peak position
New Zealand Albums (RMNZ)	22
