= Jacob Portrait =

American musician

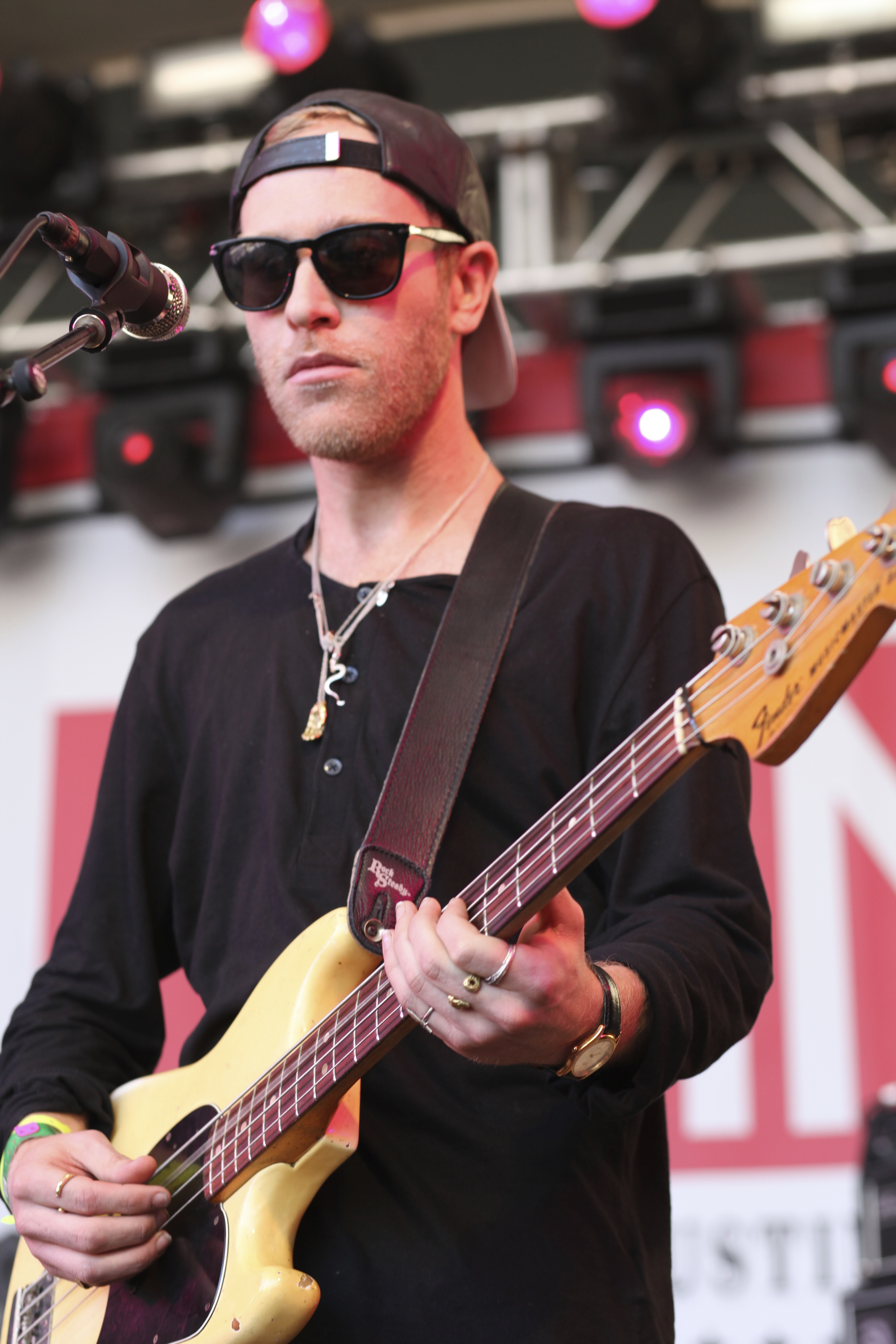
- Portrait performing with Unknown Mortal Orchestra in 2013

Background information
- Also known as: Jake Portrait
- Born: Jacob Martin Portrait; Portland, Oregon, United States
- Genres: Psychedelic rock; alternative rock; indie rock
- Occupations: Multi-instrumentalist; songwriter; record producer
- Instruments: Bass guitar; guitar; keyboards; drums
- Years active: 1999–present
- Member of: Unknown Mortal Orchestra; Blouse

Jacob Martin Portrait is an American multi-instrumentalist, songwriter, and record producer. He is the bassist of the New Zealand psychedelic rock band Unknown Mortal Orchestra, and a current member of the Portland-based alternative rock band Blouse.

== Career ==
Portrait was born in Greenbrae, California. Growing up, he has lived in Vancouver, Washington as well as Eugene, Medford and Portland, Oregon. Portrait is currently based in Brooklyn, New York, where he runs a private recording studio.

Portrait started the psychedelic rock band Unknown Mortal Orchestra in 2010 along with Ruban Nielson, and is currently playing with the band as their bassist. He has worked with the band on their albums Multi-Love (2015), Sex & Food (2018), IC-01 Hanoi (2018), V (2023), and IC-02 Bogotá (2025).

Portrait teamed up with singer-guitarist Charlie Hilton and bassist Patrick Adams to form the alternative rock band Blouse in Portland. The band's self-titled first album was released in 2011, and the band's second album Imperium was released in 2013.

Some of Portrait’s most recent writing and production credits include Lil Yachty’s album Let’s Start Here. (2023) and Montell Fish's album CHARLOTTE (2024). In 2024, he’s also written and produced on Marc Rebillet’s “Vibes Alright”, Christopher Owens’ “This Is My Guitar”, Still Woozy’s “Rid of Me”, and “Slay Bitch (Bonus Track)” on Remi Wolf’s album Big Ideas.

In 2016 he produced the album Palana by Charlie Hilton of Blouse. Porches' album Ricky Music was co-produced by Portrait. He co-produced and recorded Someone New by Helena Deland. He also collaborated with Okay Kaya on her album Watch This Liquid Pour Itself.

Portrait has worked with Alex G as a mixing engineer on his albums Beach Music (2015), Rocket (2017), House of Sugar (2019), and God Save the Animals (2022). God Save the Animals was co-produced by Portrait with Alex G. He also worked as an audio engineer on Whitney's Forever Turned Around in 2019.

In 2021, he worked as a producer and writer on Cloves' Nightmare on Elmfield Road. Several tracks on Claud's debut album Super Monster were composed and produced by Portrait.

== Awards ==
- 2015 - APRA Silver Scroll Awards - Nominated (Song: "Can't Keep Checking My Phone" - Songwriter)
- 2018 - APRA Silver Scroll Awards - Nominated (Song: "Hunnybee" - Songwriter)

== Selected production discography ==
Year	Artist	Title	Role
2023	Lil Yachty	Strike (Holster)	Composer, Musical Producer, Producer, Recording
2023	Lil Yachty	Let's Start Here	Composer
2022	Empath	Visitor	Producer
2022	JayWood	Slingshot	Bass, Drum Machine, Fender Rhodes, Guitar (Bass), Organ, Producer, Synthesizer, Wah Wah Bass
2022	Whitney	SPARK	Mixing
2022	Sunflower Bean	Head Full of Sugar	Producer, Engineer, Mixing, Composer
2022	Alex G	God Save the Animals	Producer, Engineer, Mixing
2022	Claud (singer)	Super Monster	Composer, Producer
2021	Portugal. The Man	Oregon City Sessions	Engineer, Mixing
2021	Cloves	Nightmare on Elmfield Road	Composer, Producer, Programming
2020	Nick Hakim	Will This Make Me Good	Additional Production
2020	Okay Kaya	Watch This Liquid Pour Itself	Mixing, Additional Production
2020	Helena Deland	Someone New	Bass, Drums, Keyboards
2020	Porches	Ricky Music	Producer, Engineer, Mixing
2020	Paloma Faith	Infinite Things	Composer
2019	Alex G	House of Sugar	Mixing, Drum Engineering
2019	Whitney	Forever Turned Around	Engineer
2018	Sunflower Bean	Twentytwo in Blue	Producer, Mixing
2018	Unknown Mortal Orchestra	Sex & Food	Bass, Composer, Engineer, Producer, Synthesizer
2018	Unknown Mortal Orchestra	IC-01 Hanoi	Engineer
2017	Pixx	The Age of Anxiety	Producer
2017	Alex G	Rocket	Mixing
2017	Alex Cameron (musician)	Forced Witness	Mixing
2017	EMA	Exile in the Outer Ring	Producer, Mixing, Cover Photo, Drum Programming, Drums, Piano, Soloist, Synthesizer Bass
2016	Whitney	Light Upon the Lake	Mixing
2016	Wild Nothing	Life of Pause	Mixing, Additional Production
2016	DIIV	Is the Is Are	Mixing, Mixing Engineer
2015	The Alchemist / Oh No	Welcome to Los Santos	Additional Production
2015	Moon King	Secret Life	Mixing
2015	King Gizzard & the Lizard Wizard	Paper Mâché Dream Balloon	Engineer
2015	Gardens & Villa	Music for Dogs	Composer
2015	Unknown Mortal Orchestra	Multi-Love	Additional Production, Bass, Co-Producer, Composer, Engineer, Producer
2015	Alex G	Beach Music	Mixing
2014	Bass Drum of Death	Rip This	MProducer, Engineer, Mixing
2014	TOPS	Picture You Staring	Mixing
2014	Wampire	Bazaar (album)	Producer, Engineer, Mixing
2013	Gauntlet Hair	Stills (Gauntlet Hair album)	Producer, Engineer, Mixing, Bass
2013	Blouse	Imperium	Producer, Bass, Composer, Drums, Guitar, Guitar (Acoustic), Guitar (Electric), Guitar (Rhythm), Guitars, Noise, Piano
2013	Unknown Mortal Orchestra	II	Bass
2013	Wampire	Curiosity	Producer, Engineer, Mixing
2011	STRFKR	Reptilians	Producer, Engineer, Mixing
2011	Blouse	Blouse	Producer, Engineer, Mixing, Guitar, Keyboards, Drums, Bass, Group Member, Composer, Drones, Percussion, Programming, Synthesizer Bass, Wurlitzer
2010	The Dandy Warhols	The Capitol Years 1995-2007	Mixing
2009	The Mint Chicks	Screens	Producer, Mixing
2008	The Dandy Warhols	...Earth to the Dandy Warhols...	Producer, Mixing
