= Curse (Unknown Mortal Orchestra EP) =

EP by Unknown Mortal Orchestra
- Released: 18 June 2025
- Studio: Home studios in Palm Springs, California, and Hilo, Hawaii
- Length: 12:39
- Label: Jagjaguwar
- Producer: Ruban Nielson

Unknown Mortal Orchestra chronology
IC-02 Bogotá (2025)	Curse (2025)

Singles from Curse
- 1. "Boys With the Characteristics of Wolves" Released: 8 June 2025

Curse (stylized in all caps) is an EP by New Zealand band Unknown Mortal Orchestra. It was announced on May 28, 2025, along with the release of the first and only single from the EP, "Boys With the Characteristics of Wolves."

== Background ==
Two months after the most previous release by the band, IC-02 Bogotá, singer Ruban Nielson announced the release of a new song, Boys With the Characteristics of Wolves, along with a new EP, Curse, to be released on June 18. In the announcement of the EP, Nielson states "In the clownish, happy-go-lucky soil of lies and chaos, a silly kind of music can grow; a senseless laughter, and we can amuse ourselves with it, however darkly. We can dance with lost minds and howl in valiant hysteria as the stormtroopers of death, confused and incredulous, pile us or those we love into their meat wagons." The EP is a homage to Italian horror movies of the 70s and 80s. The band's frontman, Ruban Nielson, was inspired to write the album by the recent death of his sister.

== Critical reception ==
The EP was called "as cathartic a listen as the band has ever recorded." The "abrasive riffs" on the track "Boys With the Characteristics of Wolves", were compared to those by Black Sabbath.

== Track listing ==
All tracks are written by Ruban Nielson

Curse track listing
No.	Title	Length
1.	"Aura"	1:22
2.	"Boys With the Characteristics of Wolves"	3:02
3.	"Death Comes from the Sky"	2:29
4.	"One Hundred Bats"	3:22
5.	"Sorcerers of Silence"	1:36
6.	"Curse"	0:59

Notes

- All tracks are stylized in upper case.

== Personnel ==
=== Unknown Mortal Orchestra ===
- Ruban Nielson
- Kody Nielson
- Jake Portrait
