= V (Unknown Mortal Orchestra album) =

2023 studio album by Unknown Mortal Orchestra

Studio album by Unknown Mortal Orchestra
- Released: 17 March 2023
- Studios: Home studios in Palm Springs, California, and Hilo, Hawaii
- Length: 60:01
- Label: Jagjaguwar
- Producer: Ruban Nielson

Unknown Mortal Orchestra chronology
| IC-01 Hanoi (2018) | V (2023) | IC-02 Bogotá (2025) |

Singles from V
- 1. "Weekend Run" Released: 25 June 2021; 2. "That Life" Released: 4 August 2021; 3. "I Killed Captain Cook" Released: 25 October 2022; 4. "Layla" Released: 2 February 2023; 5. "Nadja" Released: 21 February 2023; 6. "Meshuggah" Released: 13 March 2023

V is the fifth studio album by New Zealand band Unknown Mortal Orchestra, released on 17 March 2023 through Jagjaguwar. A double album, it was recorded by bandleader Ruban Nielson in California and Hawaii. It was preceded by the release of six singles and accompanying music videos: "Weekend Run", "That Life", "I Killed Captain Cook", "Layla", "Nadja" and "Meshuggah". The album received positive reviews from critics and reached number seven on the New Zealand Albums Chart. It was a finalist for the Aotearoa Music Award for Album of the Year.

== Background and recording ==
The album was influenced by "West Coast AOR, classic hits, weirdo pop and Hawaiian Hapa-haole music". It was created in Palm Springs, California, and Hilo, Hawaii. The album's performers include bandleader Ruban Nielson and his brother, Kody. It also features their father, saxophonist and flutist Chris Nielson, and longtime Unknown Mortal Orchestra member Jacob Portrait.

== Promotion and release ==
=== Singles and music videos ===
On 25 June 2021, the single "Weekend Run" was released with an accompanying music video filmed by Amanda Hugenquist and edited by Chloe Hemingway. The video depicts bandleader Ruban Nielson performing a variety of daily activities, including playing video games, riding an exercise bicycle, eating meals, and sitting beside a swimming pool while drinking from a bottle of champagne.

A second single, "That Life", was released on 4 August 2021. The single was accompanied by a surrealist music video directed by Lydia Fine and Tony Blahd that features a dancing blue puppet modeled after Ruban Nielson. The puppet was created by puppeteer and fabricator Laura Manns, who has worked with The Muppets and Sesame Street. As the puppet dances beside a swimming pool, he begins drinking and losing his grip on reality. The scene shifts to a desert, where the puppet is abducted by aliens. He returns dressed only in his underwear, but resumes his dancing in a restless stupor. The video ends with the puppet left in a daze, drooling and sweating profusely. The sense of reality is skewed throughout the video as the camouflaged puppeteers are increasingly made visible. Camera shots occasionally zoom out to reveal that each of the puppet's locations are fabricated sets in a studio.

On 25 October 2022, "I Killed Captain Cook", was released with a press release indicating the song would appear on a forthcoming double album to be released in 2023. An accompanying Super 8 music video directed by Ruban Nielson was released alongside the single, featuring his mother hula dancing on the beach at Keaukaha in Hilo, Hawaii.

The album was officially announced on 2 February 2023, alongside the release of the fourth single "Layla". The single was accompanied by a music video directed by the Brazilian directing duo Vira-Lata. The video is the first part of a two-part series chronicling the adventures of two young women bonded through a passionate but ephemeral friendship. The album's fifth single, "Nadja", was released on 21 February 2023 with another visual directed by Vira-Lata. A stark contrast to the euphoric and energetic narrative of the video for "Layla", the sequel video depicts the two young women after they have separated. Dark imagery and depictions of isolation are contrasted with radiant colours and scenes of a dance party, mirroring the juxtaposition between the song's music and lyrics. The video series ends with the two women standing in shallow water as they reunite in an emotional embrace.

The album's sixth and final single, "Meshuggah", was released on 13 March 2023. On 17 March 2023, a music video directed by Morian Mikhail was released, featuring footage of street racing stitched together with scenes of a young romance.

=== Tour ===
On 25 October 2022, the band announced an upcoming tour of North America and the United Kingdom beginning in March 2023, marking their first tour dates in four years.

== Music and themes ==
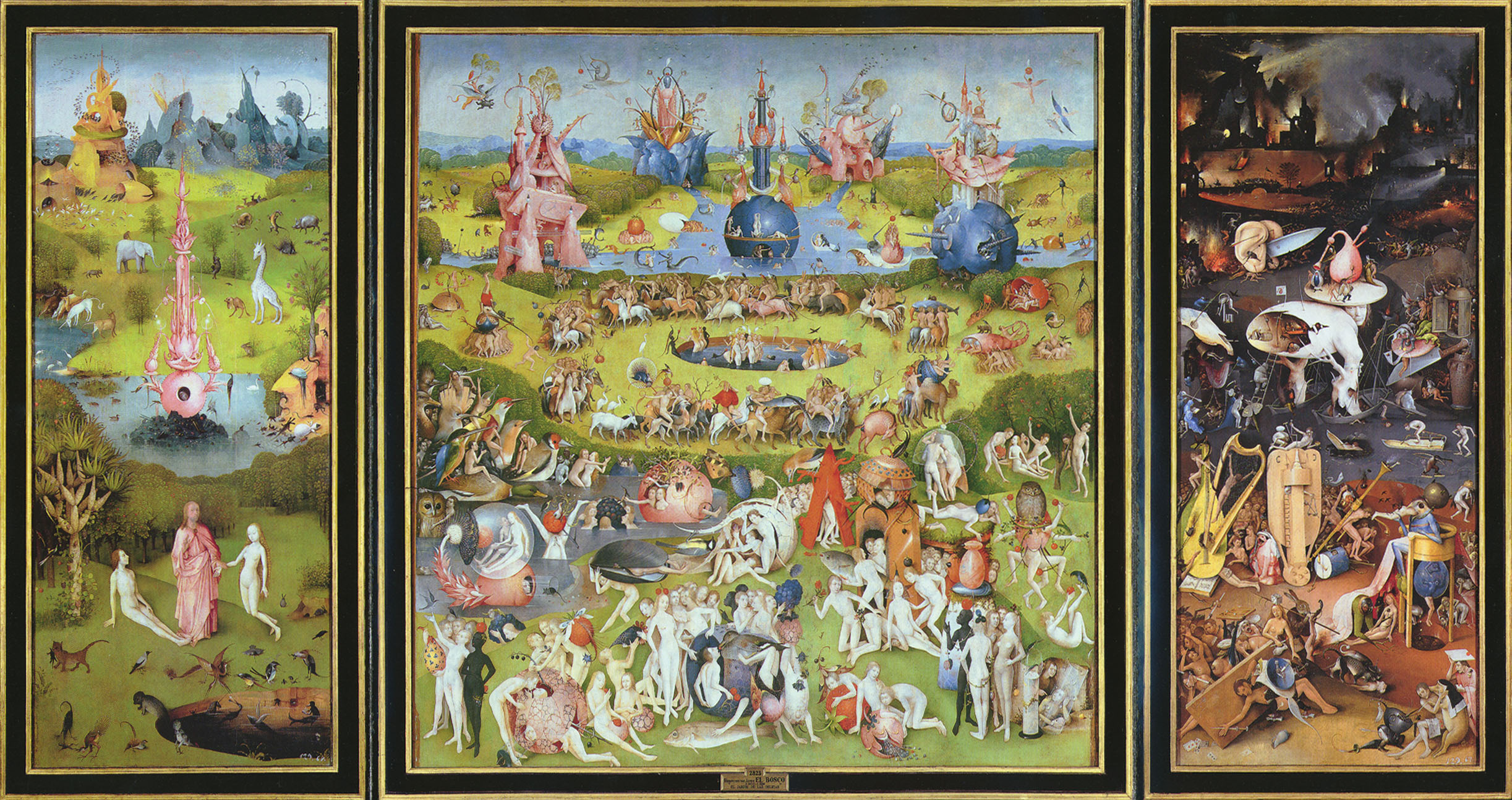
The Garden of Earthly Delights by Hieronymus Bosch

"That Life" is a mid-tempo psychedelic pop song with a prominent "tumbling" guitar riff. The song features a "playful" rhythm and leans into a funk sound. Many critics characterised the song as having a "sunny" summer quality. The song was inspired by Hieronymus Bosch's triptych altarpiece The Garden of Earthly Delights and the puzzle book illustrations of Where's Wally. It imagines similar "contrasting scenes and multiple characters all engaged in that same perverse mixture of luxury, reverie, damnation, in the landscape of America. Somewhere on holiday under a vengeful sun". "That Life" has been interpreted as a commentary on the clash between escapism and the harsh realities of life. Nielson sings, "Girl in the bathroom, Florida key / Certainties all away / Brother of cocaine, a tequila son-in-law / End of the world today / How do the clouds get as pink as a peach?" Scott Russell of Paste described the track's "uncanny energy" as being "both carefree and apocalyptic, part daydream and part waking nightmare".

"Weekend Run" is a "groove-heavy" track with a strong influence of 1970s disco music and soul. A slow-burning five-minute number, the song is populated with "pop-infused" melodies and a "danceable" beat. Nielson's soft, "laidback" vocals throughout the track are backed by "wavy" indie guitar riffs and a "chugging" bassline. The song's lyrical content explores themes of escapism as Nielson sings about the week's mundanities and chasing the "perfect velvet freedom" provided by the weekend. The lyrics list each day of the week, building up to the chorus where Nielson sings, "When the weekend comes / Yeah, we'll be lost in love". The song's "stop-start" structure creates a feeling of repetition, mimicking Nielson's repetition of the days of the week.

"Nadja" is a melancholy track characterised by the "quiet sway" of its "gentle" rhythm. It features sparse instrumentation that highlights Nielson's "hypnotic" vocals and guitar. The lyrics touch upon themes of escape, paranoia, and obsession as Nielson sings, "Nadja baby / Found a strand of your hair and ate it / Couldn't throw away this thing you left behind". The song's dark lyrical themes are juxtaposed with the song's "supreme sense of sonic bliss". The song has been perceived as being a sequel to "Layla".

"I Killed Captain Cook" is an acoustic ballad told from the perspective of the Hawaiian who killed the British explorer Captain James Cook, after he attempted to kidnap the ruling Hawaiian chief Kalaniʻōpuʻu in 1779. According to the song's press release, the song was written for Nielson's mother, who would "tell him the story as a child with pride". The song is unique for employing the Hapa-haole (Half white) tradition of Hawaiian music, which blends traditional Hawaiian melodies with English lyrics. The song was heavily influenced by the fingerpicking style known as slack-key guitar. Lyrically, Nielson drew inspiration from the work of the Melbourne-based drone metal duo Divide and Dissolve.

== Critical reception ==
Professional ratings
Aggregate scores
| Source | Rating |
|---|---|
| AnyDecentMusic? | 7.1/10 |
| Metacritic | 76/100 |
Review scores
| Source | Rating |
| AllMusic | 3.5/5 stars |
| Clash | 8/10 |
| DIY | 3.5/5 stars |
| Mojo | 3/5 stars |
| NME | 4/5 stars |
| Paste | 8.0/10 |
| Pitchfork | 6.7/10 |
| PopMatters | 7/10 |
| Record Collector | 4/5 stars |
| Uncut | 9/10 |

At Metacritic, which assigns a normalized rating out of 100 to reviews from professional publications, the album received an average score of 76, based on 12 reviews.

Fred Thomas of AllMusic wrote, "It's just as easy for a listener to drift off in thought as it is to obsess over its patchwork details and strange coloration, reaching a deeper, more thoughtful expression of the kind of bizarre beauty the band excels at." Jason Anderson of Uncut gave the album a 9 out of 10 rating, calling it "an album confirming Ruban Nielson's versatility and imagination, as well as a new willingness to escape the nooks and crannies of his own psyche and engage more fully with the world outside". Kevin Harley of Record Collector called it Nielson's "most expansive, inviting work yet".

Victoria Segal of Mojo gave the album 3 out of 5 stars, concluding, "There are featureless patches, bits of white-box real-estate that need a little more character, but there's always something intriguing around V's corners". Pitchfork's Marty Sartini Garner wrote, "Ruban Nielson accompanies some of his strongest songwriting and performances to date with foggy production that makes the whole thing feel like a long, rummy sigh".

=== Year-end lists ===
Select year-end rankings of V
| Publication/critic | Accolade | Rank | Ref. |
|---|---|---|---|
| Double J | The 50 Best Albums of 2023 | 17 | |
| Uncut | The 75 Best New Albums of 2023 | 41 | |
| Vogue | The Best Albums of 2023 | 30 | |

== Track listing ==
V track listing
| No. | Title | Writer(s) | Length |
|---|---|---|---|
| 1. | "The Garden" | Kody Nielson; Ruban Nielson; Jacob Portrait | 6:20 |
| 2. | "Guilty Pleasures" | K. Nielson; R. Nielson; Portrait | 3:28 |
| 3. | "Meshuggah" | R. Nielson | 4:37 |
| 4. | "The Widow" | Chris Nielson; K. Nielson; R. Nielson | 5:10 |
| 5. | "In the Rear View" | K. Nielson; R. Nielson | 4:04 |
| 6. | "That Life" | R. Nielson | 3:35 |
| 7. | "Layla" | K. Nielson; R. Nielson | 4:10 |
| 8. | "Shin Ramyun" | K. Nielson; R. Nielson | 4:49 |
| 9. | "Weekend Run" | K. Nielson; R. Nielson | 4:47 |
| 10. | "The Beach" | C. Andrews; K. Nielson; R. Nielson | 3:17 |
| 11. | "Nadja" | K. Nielson; R. Nielson | 4:06 |
| 12. | "Keaukaha" | K. Nielson; R. Nielson | 2:14 |
| 13. | "I Killed Captain Cook" | R. Nielson | 3:28 |
| 14. | "Drag" | K. Nielson; R. Nielson; Portrait | 5:56 |
| Total length: | | | 60:01 |

== Personnel ==
1. "The Garden"

- Ruban Nielson – vocals, guitar, piano
- Jacob Portrait – bass
- Kody Nielson – drums, piano, synthesizer

2. "Guilty Pleasures"

- Ruban Nielson – vocals, piano, bass
- Kody Nielson – drums
- Chris Nielson – trumpet, trombone, tenor saxophone
- Jacob Portrait – bass synthesizer

3 "Meshuggah"

- Ruban Nielson – all vocals and instruments

4. "The Widow"

- Ruban Nielson – guitar, bass, violin, electric piano
- Kody Nielson – drums, piano
- Chris Nielson – tenor saxophone

5. "In the Rear View"

- Ruban Nielson – vocals, guitar
- Kody Nielson – drums, piano
- Chris Nielson – flutes

6. "That Life"

- Ruban Nielson – all vocals and instruments

7. "Layla"

- Ruban Nielson – vocals, guitar, bass, synthesizer
- Kody Nielson – drums

8. "Shin Ramyun"

- Ruban Nielson – guitar, bass, drums
- Kody Nielson – piano

9. "Weekend Run"

- Ruban Nielson – vocals, guitar, bass, drums
- Kody Nielson – piano, clavinet

10. "The Beach"

- Ruban Nielson – vocals and all instruments
- Kody Nielson – additional vocals

11. "Nadja"

- Ruban Nielson – all vocals and instruments

12. "Keaukaha"

- Ruban Nielson – guitar
- Kody Nielson – electric piano, synthesizer

13. "I Killed Captain Cook"

- Ruban Nielson – all vocals and instruments

14. "Drag"

- Ruban Nielson – vocals, guitar
- Kody Nielson – drums, percussion
- Jacob Portrait – bass

Other credits

- Kody Nielson – additional interstitial piano and synthesizer
- Ruban Nielson – production, engineering, mixing, cover
- Bob Ludwig – mastering
- Miles Johnson – layout

== Charts ==
Chart performance for V
| Chart (2023) | Peak position |
|---|---|
| Australian Albums (ARIA) | 97 |
| New Zealand Albums (RMNZ) | 7 |
| Scottish Albums (Official Charts) | 32 |
| UK Album Downloads (Official Charts) | 36 |
| UK Independent Albums (Official Charts) | 8 |
