= 2016 Taite Music Prize =

Music award ceremony

- Awarded for: The best NZ album released in 2015
- Sponsored by: Recorded Music NZ; Red Bull; Moa Brewing
- Date: 20 April, 2016
- Venue: Galatos
- Country: New Zealand
- Hosted by: Emma Smith & Wallace Chapman
- Act: The Leonard Charles Casiotone Orchestra
- Reward: $10,000
- Winner(s): Personal Computer, by Silicon

Highlights
- IMNZ Classic Record: E Tu, by Upper Hutt Posse
- Website: indies.co.nz

The seventh annual Taite Music Prize was presented on 20 April 2016 at a ceremony in Auckland, organised by Independent Music New Zealand (IMNZ). The winner of the main award was Kody Nielson for the Silicon album Personal Computer. The IMNZ Classic Record award went to landmark hip hop single, E Tu, released by Upper Hutt Posse in 1988.

== Main Prize ==
The ceremony and its main award share the "Taite Music Prize" name. Sometimes called the Taite Main, this award recognises New Zealand's best album of the previous year (2015). The winner, Personal Computer by Silicon (Kody Nielson), was selected by a panel of expert judges including Emma Smith, who co-hosted the award ceremony, and Peter McLellan.

Criteria for the award include artistic merit, creativity, innovation and excellence. The winner received $10,000 from Recorded Music NZ and free recording time in Red Bull Studios, a year's supply of Red Bull, and two magnums of beer from Moa Brewing.

=== Winner ===
Silicon's Personal Computer was announced as the winner in a prerecorded video by 2015 winners Jakob. Kody Nielson wasn't at the ceremony but later said that winning felt "weird, because the other albums nominated are huge".

Judge Emma Smith said that Personal Computer was, "singular vision, beautifully executed, that speaks to now. And it's funny."

=== Nominations and finalists ===
An open call for nominations ran from 15 December 2015 - 28 January 2016, and a total of 52 albums were entered. This list went to a vote of all IMNZ members, which found eight finalists. They were announced in February.

The shortlist included two previous winners, SJD (2013) and UMO (2012), as well as future winners Princess Chelsea (2023) and Anthonie Tonnon (2022). The Phoenix Foundation were listed for a third time in only the seventh year of the prize. First-time nominees Nadia Reid and Marlon Williams would go on to make three and four finals respectively (as of 2026).

As well as being a finalist (and winner) for his solo project, Silicon, Kody Nielson also worked on the Unknown Mortal Orchestra album Multi-Love.

2016 Taite Music Prize finalists
Artist	Album	Result
The Phoenix Foundation	Give Up Your Dreams	Nominated
Princess Chelsea	The Great Cybernetic Depression	Nominated
Nadia Reid	Listen to Formation, Look for the Signs	Nominated
Silicon	Personal Computer	Won
SJD	Saint John Divine	Nominated
Anthonie Tonnon	Successor	Nominated
Unknown Mortal Orchestra	Multi-Love	Nominated
Marlon Williams	Marlon Williams	Nominated

== IMNZ Classic Record ==
E Tu, the 12-inch single by Upper Hutt Posse first released on Jayrem Records in 1988, is recognised as New Zealand's first rap record. It announced as 2016's winner of the IMNZ Classic Album award on 8 April. There was no public nomination process or vote.

When the announcement was made ahead of the award ceremony, group member Te Kupu (Dean Hapeta, also known as D Word) said, "It’s great for a conscious song of resistance to be respected in this way, and although it already has a firm place in the hip-hop musical history of Aotearoa, this award is somewhat unexpected and therefore a little extra pleasing. UHP appreciates the regard shown to us, and to all musicians, composers and artists who’re compelled to create songs of conscience, ka whawhai tonu tatou!"

Judge Peter McLennan called E Tu "a hugely important record, both culturally and politically. It showed local rap fans and budding rappers that we could make this exciting new genre our own, with rhyming in Te Reo and English, and by name-checking local history. Upper Hutt Posse are our hip-hop pioneers, and they opened the gates for the likes of Dam Native, 3 the Hard Way, and Che Fu."

The award was presented by activist and artist Tame Iti (Ngāi Tūhoe) to Te Kupu and his brother and UHP co-founder Matthew Hapeta. They performed an a cappella version of E Tu.

== Award ceremony ==
The invite-only Taite Music Prize ceremony was held on 20 April 2016 at Galatos nightclub and livestreamed by 95bFM. 300 people attended. It was co-hosted by broadcasters Emma Smith and Wallace Chapman. A group including Jeremy Toy (She's So Rad), billed as the Leonard Charles Casiotone Orchestra, performed a medley of songs drawn from all eight finalists.
