= IC-02 Bogotá =

Studio album by Unknown Mortal Orchestra
- Released: 28 March 2025
- Studio: Estudio Naranja (Bogotá)
- Length: 50:55
- Label: Jagjaguwar
- Producer: Ruban Nielson

Unknown Mortal Orchestra chronology
V (2023)	IC-02 Bogotá (2025)	Curse (2025)

Unknown Mortal Orchestra instrumental albums chronology
IC-01 Hanoi (2018)	IC-02 Bogotá (2025)

Singles from IC-02 Bogotá
- 1. "Earth 1" Released: 5 February 2025

IC-02 Bogotá is the second instrumental album by New Zealand rock band Unknown Mortal Orchestra, released on 28 March 2025 through Jagjaguwar. Following V released in 2023, IC-02 Bogotá serves as the sequel to the 2018 instrumental LP IC-01 Hanoi in the IC (Improvisation/Collaboration) series. Described by Ruban Nielson as "possible background music for some strange parties and night drives in your future", it was entirely recorded in the city of Bogotá, Colombia, and features contributions from guest percussionist Jose David Infante.

== Critical reception ==
Professional ratings
Aggregate scores
Source	Rating
Metacritic	70/100
Review scores
Source	Rating
DIY	4/5 stars
Pitchfork	7.3/10

At Metacritic, which assigns a normalized rating out of 100 to reviews from mainstream critics, IC-02 Bogotá received an average score of 70 based on seven reviews, indicating "generally favorable reviews".

Rolling Stone UK called the album "a beautifully immersive and exploratory sidestep" from the regular Unknown Mortal Orchestra albums.

== Track listing ==
All tracks are written by Chris Nielson, Christian Li, Jacob Portrait, Kody Nielson and Ruban Nielson.

No.	Title	Length
1.	"Earth 1"	11:11
2.	"Earth 2"	6:33
3.	"Earth 3"	8:44
4.	"Earth 5"	3:48
5.	"Heaven 7"	3:08
6.	"Underworld 1"	1:53
7.	"Underworld 4"	1:31
8.	"Underworld 6"	14:07
Total length:		50:55

== Personnel ==
=== Unknown Mortal Orchestra ===
- Ruban Nielson – guitar, bass, production, mixing
- Kody Nielson – drums, percussion, Casio, album cover photo
- Jake Portrait – guitar, bass, Casio

=== Additional contributors ===
- Chris Nielson – horns, Juno
- Christian Li – keyboards
- Jose David Infante – percussion, engineering
- JJ Golden – mastering
- Juan Ortiz-Arenas – back cover photo
- Miles Johnson – design
