= Sex & Food =

Studio album by Unknown Mortal Orchestra
- Released: 6 April 2018
- Recorded: 2016–2017
- Studios: Panoram (Mexico City, Mexico); Union (Seoul, South Korea); Phu Sa (Hanoi, Vietnam); Rasmus auga (Reykjavík, Iceland); Ruban Nielson's basement (Portland, Oregon); Kody Nielson's home studio (Auckland, New Zealand)
- Genres: Psychedelic; groove; rock; folk; R&B; disco
- Length: 40:45
- Label: Jagjaguwar
- Producer: Ruban Nielson

Unknown Mortal Orchestra chronology
Multi-Love (2015)	Sex & Food (2018)	IC-01 Hanoi (2018)

Singles from Sex & Food
- 1. "American Guilt" Released: 23 January 2018; 2. "Not in Love We're Just High" Released: 27 February 2018; 3. "Everyone Acts Crazy Nowadays" Released: 26 March 2018

Sex & Food (stylized as sex + food) is the fourth studio album by New Zealand band Unknown Mortal Orchestra, released on 6 April 2018 through Jagjaguwar. According to leader of UMO Ruban Nielson, the album features a more expansive and eclectic sound than previous records, inspired by the international locations where it was recorded, including Mexico City, Seoul, Hanoi and Reykjavík, as well as Nielson's native Auckland and home Portland.

The lead single of the album, "American Guilt", was released on 23 January 2018, while the music video premiered on 8 February 2018. "Not In Love We're Just High" was released on 27 February as the second single, and "Everyone Acts Crazy Nowadays" was released on 26 March as the third single.

An animated music video was made for the track "Hunnybee".

== Critical reception ==
Professional ratings
Aggregate scores
Source	Rating
AnyDecentMusic?	7.2/10
Metacritic	75/100
Review scores
Source	Rating
AllMusic	4/5 stars
The A.V. Club	B−
Clash	8/10
Exclaim!	6/10
NME	3/5 stars
Pitchfork	7.0/10
PopMatters	8/10
Q	3/5 stars
The Skinny	4/5 stars
Uncut	9/10

Sex & Food received generally positive reviews from critics. At Metacritic, which assigns a normalised rating out of 100 to reviews from mainstream publications, the album received an average score of 75 based on 19 reviews.

== Track listing ==
All tracks written and produced by Ruban Nielson, except where noted.

No.	Title	Writer(s)	Producer(s)	Length
1.	"A God Called Hubris"	Ruban Nielson; Kody Nielson	R. Nielson; K. Nielson^{[a]}	0:41
2.	"Major League Chemicals"			3:53
3.	"Ministry of Alienation"			3:43
4.	"Hunnybee"	R. Nielson; K. Nielson; Jacob Portrait	R. Nielson; Portrait^{[a]}	4:28
5.	"Chronos Feasts on His Children"			1:42
6.	"American Guilt"	R. Nielson; K. Nielson; Portrait		4:33
7.	"The Internet of Love (That Way)"			4:57
8.	"Everyone Acts Crazy Nowadays"	R. Nielson; K. Nielson	R. Nielson; K. Nielson^{[a]}	4:15
9.	"This Doomsday"			3:32
10.	"How Many Zeros"		R. Nielson; K. Nielson^{[a]}; Portrait^{[a]}	3:25
11.	"Not in Love We're Just High"		R. Nielson; Portrait^{[a]}	3:38
12.	"If You're Going to Break Yourself"			4:38
Total length:				43:18

Japan bonus track
No.	Title	Length
13.	"SB-05"	27:42
Total length:		71:16

Notes

- ^{^[a]} signifies a co-producer.

== Personnel ==
Credits adapted from the liner notes of Sex & Food.

- Ruban Nielson – production, mixing; vocals (tracks 2–12), guitars (tracks 2, 4–10, 12), bass (tracks 1, 2, 7, 8, 10, 12), Rhodes (tracks 3, 4, 7, 8, 10, 11), synthesizer (tracks 3, 4, 6, 8, 11), percussion (tracks 2, 6, 7), MPC (track 1), electric sitar (track 3), piano (track 4), drones (track 6), drums (track 7), strings (track 9), HC-TT (track 12)
- Kody Nielson – drums (tracks 1–4, 6, 8–12), synthesizer (tracks 8, 10), piano (track 1), percussion (track 8); co-production (tracks 1, 8, 10), additional engineering (track 2–4, 8)
- Jacob Portrait – bass (tracks 3, 4, 6, 12), synthesizer (tracks 2, 12); co-production (tracks 4, 10, 11), additional engineering (tracks 6, 12)
- Naomi Win – violin (tracks 3, 4, 8)
- Quincy McCrary – organ (track 2)
- Chris Nielson – saxophone (track 3)
- Bob Ludwig – mastering
- Neil Krug – cover
- Miles Johnson – layout

== Charts ==
Chart (2018)	Peak position
Australian Albums (ARIA)	76
Belgian Albums (Ultratop Flanders)	63
Dutch Albums (Album Top 100)	98
New Zealand Albums (RMNZ)	9
Scottish Albums (Official Charts)	50
UK Albums (Official Charts)	56
US Billboard 200	188
US Independent Albums (Billboard)	12
US Top Rock Albums (Billboard)	35
