= Unknown Mortal Orchestra (album) =

Studio album by Unknown Mortal Orchestra
- Released: 21 June 2011
- Recorded: 2010
- Genre: Indie pop; psychedelic rock; lo-fi
- Length: 30:09
- Label: Fat Possum; True Panther Sounds; Seeing Records; Spunk Records

Unknown Mortal Orchestra chronology
Unknown Mortal Orchestra (2011)	II (2013)

Singles from Unknown Mortal Orchestra
- 1. "Ffunny Ffrends" Released: 17 May 2010; 2. "Thought Ballune" Released: 1 June 2010

Unknown Mortal Orchestra is the debut album by the New Zealand rock band Unknown Mortal Orchestra, released on 21 June 2011 on Fat Possum Records.

The album won the 2012 Taite Music Prize.

== Background and recording ==
Ruban Nielson left The Mint Chicks in the beginning of 2010, citing a loss of interest in the group's music. Following an incident during one of the band's last live performances, the band broke up. Nielson returned to Portland, Oregon, where he began working at a film production company as an illustrator. He quickly found himself wanting to write and record music again and began searching for "psychedelic records with lost tunes" for inspiration. Nielson had become very specific about what type of record he wanted to find for inspiration and, with that specificity, began making that record himself instead. Once he had finished writing and recording the album's first song, Nielson uploaded it anonymously on 17 May 2010 onto Bandcamp under the name "Ffunny Ffrends". Within a day, the song had received significant coverage from independent music blogs such as Pitchfork.

Nielson maintained the band's anonymity as he was not sure what he wanted the band to be and did not want to "face up to Mint Chicks fans and to people who were looking forward to a new Mint Chicks record." Nielson eventually claimed the track under the band name Unknown Mortal Orchestra.

On the subject of the album's recording subsequent to the coverage of and reception towards "Ffunny Ffrends", Nielson said:

I was just trying to make it sound like all of the records I was listening to. I wanted it to sound like it was from an old archive or an unreleased album. I wanted it to be a combination of everything but not have any rules, and I wanted to sing whatever words felt appropriate for the song. I wanted to play more guitar solos and be more jammy than The Mint Chicks. Theres a lot of vintage stores in Portland so I was running around finding dictaphones from the sixties, and I found a reel-to-reel tape recorder, and so I was recording things to tape and then putting it in Pro Tools, just experimenting to see if I could make it sound like something from a different era. Like someone had gone back in time.

== Artwork ==
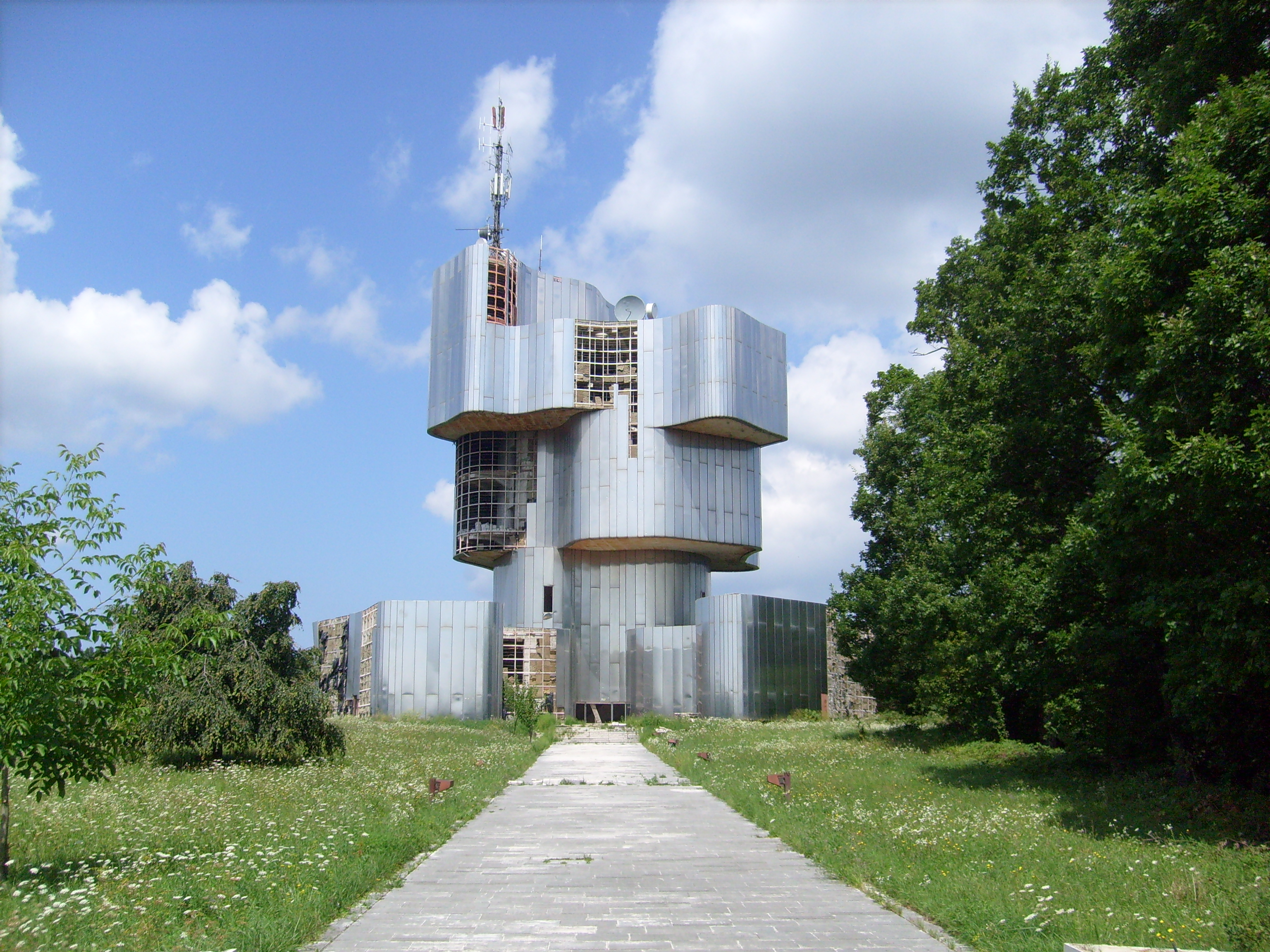
Monument to the uprising of the people of Kordun and Banija, 2010

The album artwork is a photograph of the Monument to the uprising of the people of Kordun and Banija, a Yugoslav World War II memorial monument built on Petrovac, the highest peak of Petrova Gora, a mountain range in central Croatia.

On the subject of the album artwork, frontman Ruban Nielson said:

Where did the album cover art come from? It’s a building in Yugoslavia. It’s called a Spomenick [sic], which is a Communist monument. It’s really run down now and I liked the idea of this mysterious building that you don’t know what it is or where it is but it’s from the past, built for the future, and is now in disrepair. It seemed to match the music, so we used an image of that that looked like a tourist photo.

I found it on one of those random-image sites– it was my desktop wallpaper the whole time I was making the record. At first, I didn’t know anything about it but it looked futuristic, which I like. It’s a visual equivalent of what I wanted people to hear when they listened to the album. But I had to find out what the picture was. So I found a reverse image search where you can upload a picture and it will find other websites that have posted it. I found out it was part of this book, Spomenik, and I contacted the photographer about using it, and he just sent me a price list– it was way out of my price range, like $15,000. But I figured since he didn’t make the building, I could probably find more images of it. So I tracked down these tourist photos with people in them that were all from really similar angles as the one in the book; I just Photoshopped the people out and combined some of the photos and used that. I wanted the people gone– like the building is something humans left behind. The more I think about it, the more it seems to make sense. The building was built for a Communist future in Yugoslavia that didn’t pan out. There was a time when those buildings were shiny and new and a lot of people were visiting them, and now people steal the panels off them for scrap metal. Sometimes I think it would be cool to travel back in time and try to make a future that’s not like the one we’re living in now.

== Critical reception ==
Professional ratings
Aggregate scores
Source	Rating
Metacritic	73/100
Review scores
Source	Rating
AllMusic	4/5 stars
The A.V. Club	C+
BBC Music	(favorable)
Consequence of Sound	C+
Drowned in Sound	7/10
musicOMH	3.5/5 stars
NME	8/10
Pitchfork	8.1/10
PopMatters	5/10 stars
Prefix Magazine	8.5/10

Unknown Mortal Orchestra received positive reviews from contemporary music critics. At Metacritic, which assigns a normalized rating out of 100 to reviews from mainstream critics, the album received an average score of 73, based on 16 reviews, which indicates "generally favorable reviews".

Ian Cohen of Pitchfork gave the album a favorable review, stating, "Combined with an expert use of space rare for such a lo-fi record, UMO manages a unique immersive and psychedelic quality without relying on the usual array of bong-ripping effects." Neil Condron of NME praised the album, stating, "Unknown Mortal Orchestra is almost unwillingly accomplished, a scruffy blend of shuffling funk and psych nostalgia that feels a lot more right than it should. Even the Dictaphone-style production works, giving this debut a Haunted Graffiti-esque mugginess, clipping the claws of the guitar hooks. Nielson probably didn't know what he was getting into when he started UMO and is probably still figuring it out now. If that means more sleepless nights for him, all the better for us." Spin' Nate Brennan called the record "a kaleidoscopic psych-rock gem".

Tim Sendra of AllMusic praised the album, stating, "It could have turned into a self-indulgent mess at some point, but Nielson never forgets that while it's cool to make cool sounds, it's better to write cool songs. And every song on the record is quite cool, some are even really great. The opening "Ffunny Ffriends," with its summer day, hazy sound and naggingly catchy vocal line, is one. So is the punchy "How Can You Luv Me," which comes off like a Beck jam only without the meta-cutesy vibe. Really, you could single out any song on the album for praise or inclusion on a killer summer mixtape and you wouldn't go wrong. The Mint Chicks were a decent band, but with Unknown Mortal Orchestra, Ruban Nielson is onto something a lot more interesting and fun." Wilson McBee of Prefix Magazine gave the album a favorable review, stating, "Unknown Mortal Orchestra has produced the rare indie pop record that seizes you on the first listen but also rewards repeated playing. The former is due to the power of Nielson's hooks, and the latter to his virtuoso guitar work and intricate production. The veil in front of Nielson's identity may have been removed, but plenty of mystery and excitement awaits anyone digging into his strange, rich music."

Dylan Nelson of PopMatters was more critical of the album, stating, "Unknown Mortal Orchestra is an ambitious debut, there can be no doubt about that. But too often, the careful distribution of musical allusions and sonic ambiguities devolves into perfunctory assertions of individuality. It would seem that Nielson's preoccupation with making the group sound different has made it sound unlike even itself. No matter how curious or inviting the artifacts, after too long, even record collectors' ideal junkshop will give them toxic shock." Erik Adams of The A.V. Club gave the album a more favorable review, stating, "Nielson's upper-register rasp occasionally recalls that of Paul McCartney, which seems appropriate—as a mercurial experiment in home recording, Unknown Mortal Orchestra lines up nicely with the ex-Beatle's McCartney and McCartney II LPs. And like those two releases, Unknown Mortal Orchestra's idiosyncrasies and straightforward melodies portend greater, untapped potential."

=== Accolades ===
Publication	Accolade	Year	Rank
Consequence of Sound	Top 50 Albums of 2011	2011	35
NME	50 Best Albums of 2011	2011	34
Prefix Magazine	Top Albums of 2011	2011	25
Stereogum	Top 50 Albums of 2011	2011	42
Uncut	The Top 50 Albums of 2011	2011	50

== Track listing ==
All tracks are written by Ruban Nielson.

No.	Title	Length
1.	"Ffunny Ffrends"	4:17
2.	"Bicycle"	4:45
3.	"Thought Ballune"	4:10
4.	"Jello and Juggernauts"	3:24
5.	"How Can You Luv Me"	3:28
6.	"Nerve Damage!"	2:15
7.	"Little Blu House"	3:01
8.	"Strangers Are Strange"	2:24
9.	"Boy Witch"	2:25
Total length:		30:09

Digital / New Zealand / Australian bonus track
No.	Title	Length
10.	"Rebuild the Theatres"	2:26
Total length:		32:35

== Personnel ==
- Ruban Nielson – vocals, electric and acoustic guitar, bass guitar, drums, percussion

== See also ==
- List of Yugoslav World War II monuments and memorials
