= Octagon, Octagon, Octagon =

EP by The Mint Chicks
- Released: 2003
- Recorded: 2002, Nielson home
- Genre: Indie rock
- Length: 14:07
- Label: Flying Nun Records
- Producer: Ruban and Kody Nielson

The Mint Chicks chronology
Octagon, Octagon, Octagon (2003)	Anti-Tiger (2004)

Professional ratings
Review scores
Source	Rating
Allmusic	3/5 stars

Octagon, Octagon, Octagon is the first recorded release by The Mint Chicks on Flying Nun Records, and is their first officially released CD-EP. Recorded in Chris Nielson's bedroom, the EP led to critical acclaim and the release of a follow-up, Anti-Tiger in 2004. Two of the tracks, "Licking Letters" and "Fat Gut Strut" were re-recorded for the Mint Chicks' first full-length, Fuck the Golden Youth in 2005.

== Track listing ==
1. "Post No Bills" - 2:00
2. "Octagon, Octagon, Octagon." - 2:29
3. "The Son" - 2:35
4. "Licking Letters" - 2:36
5. "Fat Gut Strut" - 2:19
6. "Double Helix" - 2:10

All tracks by R. and K. Nielson except Track 5 (K. Nielson) and Track 6 (The Mint Chicks)

== Personnel ==
- Paul Roper — Drums
- Michael Logie — Bass Guitar
- Kody Nielson — Vocals
- Ruban Nielson — Guitar
- Evan Short — Mastering
