= Multi-Love =

Studio album by Unknown Mortal Orchestra
- Released: 26 May 2015
- Recorded: 2015
- Genres: Psychedelic rock; indie rock; indie pop; psychedelic soul
- Length: 41:03
- Label: Jagjaguwar
- Producer: Ruban Nielson

Unknown Mortal Orchestra chronology
II (2013)	Multi-Love (2015)	Sex & Food (2018)

Singles from Multi-Love
- 1. "Multi-Love" Released: 5 February 2015; 2. "Can't Keep Checking My Phone" Released: 20 April 2015

Multi-Love is the third studio album by the New Zealand band Unknown Mortal Orchestra. It was released on 26 May 2015. Frontman and primary contributor Ruban Nielson produced, mixed, and engineered the entirety of Multi-Love. The title is a reference to the polyamorous relationship which Ruban Nielson had with his wife and a younger woman for a year. The album explores themes of euphoria, sexual experimentation and emotional exhaustion.

The album won the 2015 APRA Silver Scroll for Best Alternative Album. Considered the band's global breakthrough, Multi-Love made it onto lists by The Guardian, NME and Consequence of Sound for the best albums of 2015. Singles "Multi-Love" and "Can't Keep Checking My Phone" were both A-listed at BBC's 6 Music. Alongside Tame Impala's Currents, it was sometimes labelled one of two major critically acclaimed works of psychedelic music in 2015. The album debuted at number 14 in New Zealand, number 44 in the United Kingdom, and at number 7 on the American Billboard Independent Charts. Like its predecessors, the album received critical acclaim, and appeared on various critics' lists of the best albums of 2015. In October 2019, Multi-Love placed at no.18 on Happy Mag's list of "The 25 best psychedelic rock albums of the 2010s".

== Development ==
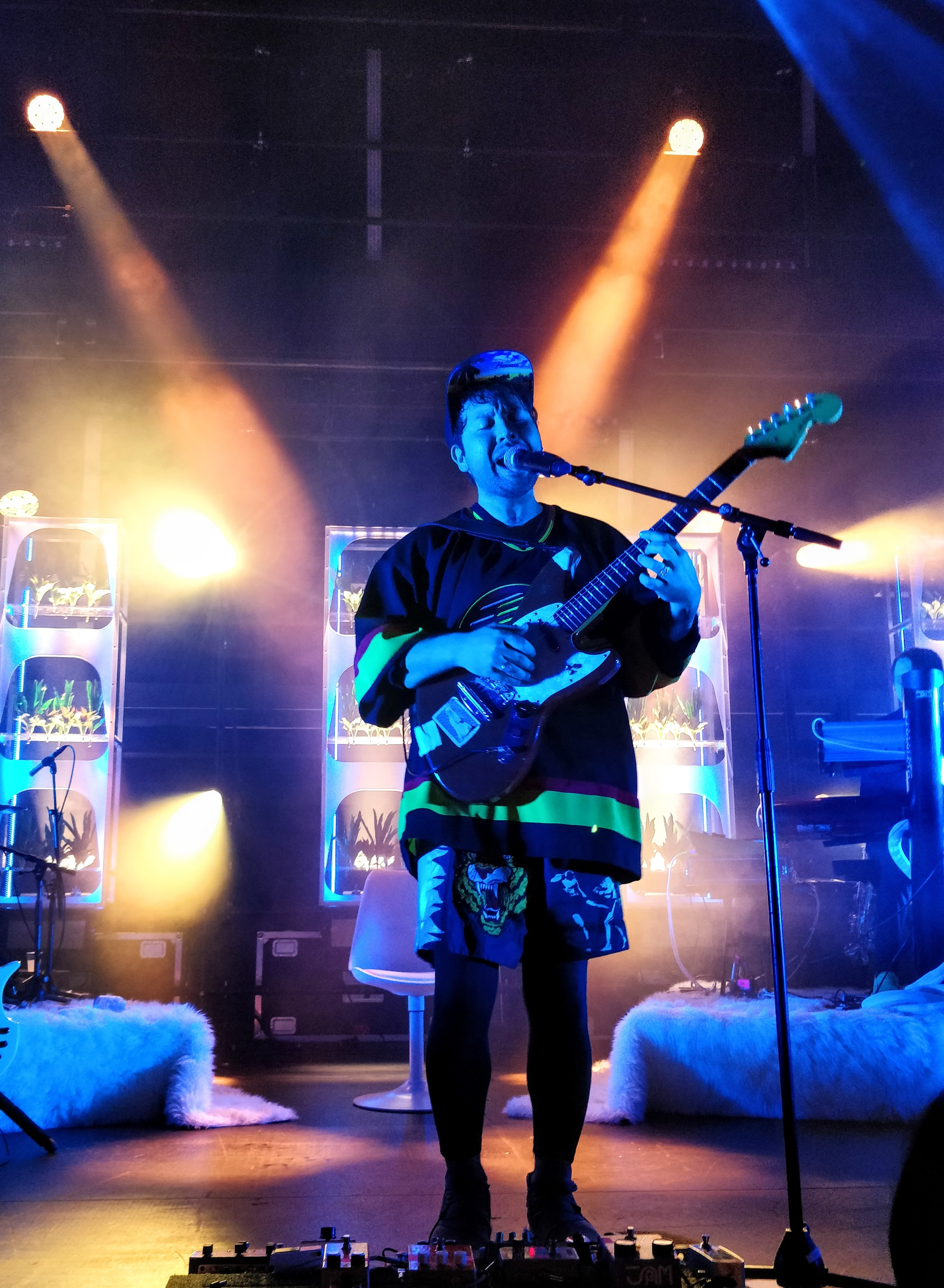
Ruban Nielson performing with Unknown Mortal Orchestra in Paris (2018)

On 5 February 2015, the band announced their third studio album, Multi-Love. Soon after, they released the title track as the first single, which was designated "Best New Track" by Pitchfork. Multi-Love was released on 26 May 2015, to universal critical acclaim. Rolling Stone commented that "Multi-Love sees Nielson coloring outside the lines for a vibrant vision of connection" and Pitchfork praised Nielson's ear for how something should sound and referred to the album as his "most accomplished". Singles "Multi-Love" and "Can't Keep Checking My Phone" were both A-listed at BBC's 6 Music. Pitchfork wrote that "[Multi Love] teems with lush synths and futurist textures, hallucinogenic funk and R&B", and was also influenced by Nielson's new life as a father (which also influenced his first and second albums with Unknown Mortal Orchestra).

The album was considered to be, by far, Nielson's most personal; thematically, it was centered on a polyamorous relationship he and his wife Jenny had with a woman, and the feelings of loss when the relationship ended. Speaking with Pitchfork, he said that despite his reservations regarding polyamory at the relationship's onset, that “I feel like I’m gonna spend the rest of my life trying to live [the relationship] down. It was such a beautiful time.” Nielson recalled treating the relationship as if it was an entirely nascent concept, and "stumbled into it blindly." He met the woman in question after venturing into a Tokyo club when touring in February 2013. Nielson recalls an instant infatuation with the woman, and reciprocated affection on her part; the pair introduced each other at the club and decided to keep in touch. Later that year, the woman came to see UMO perform in Melbourne, and the pair continued to communicate via letter. After introducing the young woman to his wife Jenny, she also took an interest in the young woman. The two women began corresponding together as well, eventually sending increasingly intimate love letters. Nielson took concern after his wife had taken a romantic interest in a woman he liked first, saying in an interview with Pitchfork; “They had turned into love letters...[Jenny] told me that I could read them if I wanted to, but I didn’t and I still don’t. It’s kind of terrifying to think that she was being intimate with another person. I didn’t get angry or upset. I just thought, ‘Oh, what have I done?’” Nielson's wife decided that the three should explore a polyamorous relationship together, and so the young woman moved in with them and their children in Portland.

The topic is a prevalent theme in the album's lyrics, and Nielson has won acclaim for how he made such topics into music form, and portraying sexual experimentation in a positive light. The fallout from the relationship and subsequent personal transformations for Ruban, his wife Jenny, and the younger woman is the basis of the album's existential themes, and contributes to an eventual catharsis Ruban had once he could finally let go from his "multi-love".

In the same interview, Nielson said: “I had two thoughts,” Nielson says, revisiting that moment. “The first was, ‘Holy shit, I’m fucked. I’m no match for this girl.’” His second: “‘This is fate. This is what I’m supposed to be doing. If this is the end of my marriage, then this will be the album that documents it. There are a million ways for this to go wrong for my life—but there’s no way for this to go wrong for me artistically, as long as I keep my eyes open and I’m brave.” Nielson said that what came next for the three of them was “a crazy awesome dream.” His children also warmed to the younger woman very quickly. The rush of euphoria, however, led to the couple's defenses "being let down", with complications arising later on. The relationship ended suddenly when the young woman's visa expired, and she was deported out of the US. Nielson's feelings of loss and longing were combined with ones of emotional exhaustion, and existential crises. This was a major theme across the work, and one critics noted and praised for Nielson's transformation of what took place that year into music form, as well as sending positive messages regarding sexual experimentation.

== Touring ==
Following the release, UMO embarked on a tour through the UK, Europe, the US and Canada, with many sold out dates. Touring continued in Europe through that November, before heading to Australia and New Zealand for a string of headline shows in December. On 12 August, UMO performed Multi-Love on Late Night with Seth Meyers. On 25 August they performed "Can't Keep Checking My Phone" on Conan. On 16 February 2016 the band performed on Last Call with Carson Daly. "Can't Keep Checking My Phone" also appears in the association football video game FIFA 16.

== Critical reception ==
Professional ratings
Aggregate scores
Source	Rating
AnyDecentMusic?	7.7/10
Metacritic	78/100
Review scores
Source	Rating
AllMusic	3.5/5 stars
The Guardian	4/5 stars
The Irish Times	3/5 stars
NME	9/10
The Observer	4/5 stars
Pitchfork	7.1/10
Q	4/5 stars
Rolling Stone	3.5/5 stars
Spin	8/10
Uncut	9/10

Multi-Love received universal acclaim from contemporary music critics. At Metacritic, which assigns a normalized rating out of 100 to reviews from mainstream critics, the album received an average score of 78, based on 25 reviews, which indicates "generally favorable reviews". Jeremy D. Larson of Pitchfork labeled it as Nielson's "most accomplished album". Members of Independent Music New Zealand voted it into the finals of the 2016 Taite Music Prize, an annual award which recognises the country's best and most original album (and which was won by UMO member Kody Neilson).

Nina Corcoran of Consequence of Sound gave the album a favorable review, stating, "By deconstructing traditional geometries of desire, they’ve made their most fully realized album yet." Mack Hayden of Paste praised the album, stating, "Unknown Mortal Orchestra can now sit back and smile at the fact they’ve written an album which could just as easily be this year’s Channel Orange as it could be its Lonerism. But then again, what makes it even better is how it’s still so distinctively UMO’s that it really can only be 2015’s Multi-Love." In October 2019, Multi-Love placed at no.18 on Happy Mag's list of "The 25 best psychedelic rock albums of the 2010s". The track "Can't Keep Checking My Phone" was featured by EA Sports on FIFA 16.

=== Accolades ===
Publication	Accolade	Year	Rank
Consequence of Sound	Top 50 Albums of 2015	2015	32
The Guardian	The Best Albums of 2015	2015	18
NME	NME's Albums of the Year 2015	2015	10
Uncut	Uncut's Best Albums of 2015	2015	12

== Track listing ==
No.	Title	Writer(s)	Producer(s)	Length
1.	"Multi-Love"	Ruban Nielson; Kody Nielson	R. Nielson; K. Nielson^{[a]}	4:10
2.	"Like Acid Rain"	R. Nielson; K. Nielson	R. Nielson; K. Nielson^{[a]}	2:02
3.	"Ur Life One Night"	R. Nielson	R. Nielson; K. Nielson^{[a]}; Jacob Portrait^{[a]}	4:27
4.	"Can't Keep Checking My Phone"	R. Nielson; Portrait	R. Nielson	4:16
5.	"Extreme Wealth and Casual Cruelty"	R. Nielson; Chris Nielson	R. Nielson; Portrait^{[b]}	6:04
6.	"The World Is Crowded"	R. Nielson; K. Nielson	R. Nielson; K. Nielson^{[a]}; Portrait^{[a]}	4:19
7.	"Stage or Screen"	R. Nielson; K. Nielson	R. Nielson	3:26
8.	"Necessary Evil"	R. Nielson; K. Nielson; C. Nielson	R. Nielson	5:17
9.	"Puzzles"	R. Nielson	R. Nielson	7:02
Total length:				41:03

Notes

- ^{^[a]} signifies a co-producer.
- ^{^[b]} signifies an additional producer.

== Personnel ==
- Ruban Nielson – guitar (all tracks), synthesizer (all tracks), vocals (all tracks), bass (tracks 1–5, 7–9), percussion (tracks 3, 4), sitar (track 1), hurdy gurdy (track 5), strings (track 9); production (all tracks), engineering (all tracks), mixing (all tracks); layout
- Kody Nielson – drums (all tracks), piano (tracks 1, 2, 6, 7), percussion (tracks 4, 5), synthesizer (tracks 3, 5), bass (track 6), backing vocals (track 9); co-production (tracks 1–3, 6), additional engineering (tracks 4, 8)
- Jacob Portrait – bass (track 4); co-production (tracks 3, 8), additional production (track 5), additional engineering (tracks 3, 4, 6)
- Riley Geare – additional drums (tracks 5, 9), percussion (track 3); additional engineering (track 5)
- Chris Nielson – horns (tracks 4, 5, 8)
- Duke Aipolani – percussion (track 5)
- Bob Ludwig – mastering
- Marla Celeste – cover image
- Miles Johnson – layout

== Charts ==
Chart (2015)	Peak position
Australian Albums (ARIA)	45
Belgian Albums (Ultratop Flanders)	70
Belgian Albums (Ultratop Wallonia)	158
Dutch Albums (Album Top 100)	37
New Zealand Albums (RMNZ)	14
UK Albums (Official Charts)	44
US Billboard 200	98
US Independent Albums (Billboard)	7
US Top Rock Albums (Billboard)	12
US Indie Store Album Sales (Billboard)	5
