= IC-01 Hanoi =

Studio album by Unknown Mortal Orchestra
- Released: 26 October 2018
- Recorded: 2017
- Studio: Phù Sa (Hanoi, Vietnam)
- Genre: Experimental jazz; psychedelic rock
- Length: 28:14
- Label: Jagjaguwar

Unknown Mortal Orchestra chronology
Sex & Food (2018)	IC-01 Hanoi (2018)	V (2023)

Unknown Mortal Orchestra instrumental albums chronology
IC-01 Hanoi (2018)	IC-02 Bogotá (2025)

Singles from IC-01 Hanoi
- 1. "Hanoi 6" Released: 25 September 2018

IC-01 Hanoi is the first instrumental album by New Zealand band Unknown Mortal Orchestra, released on 26 October 2018 through Jagjaguwar. It is the group's second album of 2018 after Sex & Food, released in April, and their first instrumental album. The album was recorded entirely in the city of Hanoi, Vietnam, and originated from sessions for Sex & Food, with frontman Ruban Nielson's father, Chris Nielson, also contributing instrumentation to the record.

The first single, the nearly 10-minute ambient and freeform "Hanoi 6", was released on 25 September 2018. The album was promoted by a series of shows across Europe and the UK, as well as Asia and several in Mexico. It was followed by IC-02 Bogotá in 2025.

== Music ==
The album has been described as a "sonic distillation of the band's influences in Jazz, Krautrock and the avant garde", as well as experimental jazz. It was influenced by the works of Miles Davis.

== Critical reception ==
Professional ratings
Aggregate scores
Source	Rating
Metacritic	66/100
Review scores
Source	Rating
The Line of Best Fit	7.5/10
Pitchfork	6.5/10

At Metacritic, which assigns a normalized rating out of 100 to reviews from mainstream publications, IC-01 Hanoi received an average score of 66, based on eight reviews, indicating "generally favorable reviews". Reviewing the album for Pitchfork, Andy Beta felt that "Ruban Nielson throws off his habitually weighty themes and digs into a refreshingly raw, heady session of psychedelic rock", also saying that the album "presents a visceral, smoky, casual session that cooks together fairly tumultuous moods over the course of its concise runtime".

== Track listing ==
No.	Title	Length
1.	"Hanoi 1"	1:20
2.	"Hanoi 2"	5:12
3.	"Hanoi 3"	2:22
4.	"Hanoi 4"	3:48
5.	"Hanoi 5"	2:30
6.	"Hanoi 6"	9:48
7.	"Hanoi 7"	3:14
Total length:		28:14

== Personnel ==
Musicians

- Ruban Nielson – guitar
- Kody Nielson – drums
- Jake Portrait – bass
- Chris Nielson – saxophone, flugelhorn, keyboards
- Minh Nguyen – đàn môi, sáo mèo, trống thanh

Technical

- Jake Portrait – engineer
- Kody Nielson – engineer
- Vu Pham – engineer, recording
- Ruban Nielson – mixing
- JJ at Golden Mastering – mastering
