= Kody Nielson =

New Zealand musician (born 1982)

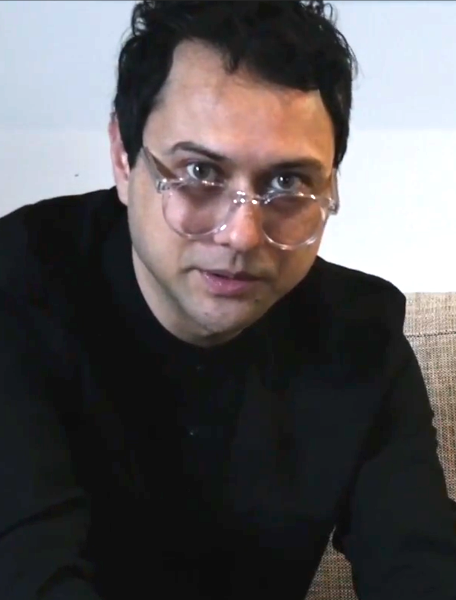
- Nielson in 2015

Background information
- Also known as: Silicon
- Born: Carl Kody Nielson; May 9, 1982 (age 44); Takapuna, Auckland, New Zealand
- Occupations: Singer; composer
- Member of: Unknown Mortal Orchestra
- Formerly of: The Mint Chicks, Opossom
- Partner(s): Bic Runga (2010–present)
- Website: godemoji.com

Carl Kody Nielson (born 9 May, 1982), also known by his musical stage name Silicon, is a New Zealand singer-songwriter, musician, and producer, best known as a former vocalist and member of the art punk band The Mint Chicks.

Nielson performed with The Mint Chicks throughout the 2000s alongside his brother, Ruban Nielson, releasing three albums. The band's 2006 release Crazy? Yes! Dumb? No!, for which Nielson was both a performer, producer, and engineer, went gold and won in several categories in the 2007 Aotearoa Music Awards, including best rock album and album of the year. The group abruptly disbanded in 2010.

In 2011, Nielson formed Opossom with his partner and fellow musician Bic Runga, and former bandmate Michael Logie, releasing their debut album Electric Hawaii the following year. The band went on hiatus shortly after due to his family commitments and Runga's other projects, prompting Nielson to go solo. In 2013, Nielson released Devils, a 6-track instrumental album. In 2015, Nielson began his solo career as a singer-songwriter under the pseudonym Silicon, with the release of Personal Computer, which won the 2016 Taite Music Prize.

Since 2018, Nielson has reunited with his brother as a member of Unknown Mortal Orchestra, and has continued to work on his solo projects, including Birthday Suite (2018) and Birthday Suite Vol. II (2021), a collection of abstract instrumental albums released under his name. In addition to his bands and projects, Nielson is also an accomplished producer and writer and has collaborated on a number of albums by other artists, including The Adults, King Kapisi, the Finn Brothers, and Bic Runga, to name some.

== Early life ==
Carl Kody Nielson was born on 9 May, 1982 in North Shore Hospital in Auckland, New Zealand. He is the son of Chris Nielson, a New Zealand jazz musician of Māori descent, and Deedee Aipolani Nielson, who is Hawaiian (Kānaka Maoli) and was crowned Miss Aloha Hula in 1974. Nielson holds dual citizenship with New Zealand and America.

Nielson grew up on the Hibiscus Coast. He was a student at Orewa College, where he and his brother Ruban met the other original members of The Mint Chicks. Nielson's older brother, Ruban Nielson, is also a musician. He has described their upbringing as difficult due to their father's alcoholism and heroin addiction, and the separation of their parents.

== Career ==
=== 2001–2010: The Mint Chicks ===
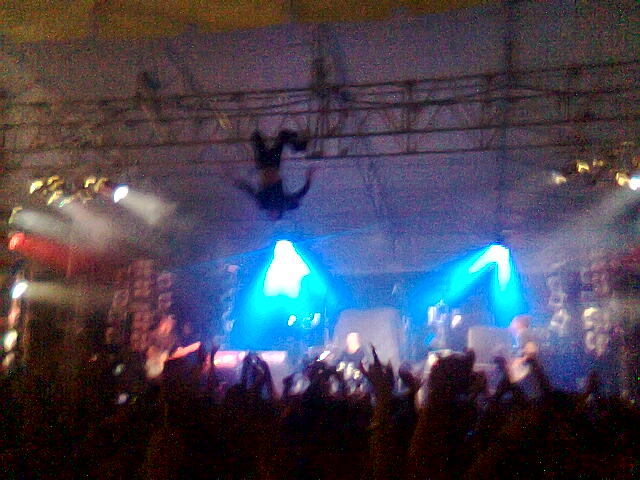
Nielson hanging upside down during a performance with The Mint Chicks in 2006

In 2001, Nielson and his brother formed a punk band at high school, performing gigs in Auckland. The band became The Mint Chicks and was soon signed to Flying Nun Records. They released three EPs and three albums: Octagon, Octagon, Octagon EP (2003), Anti-Tiger EP (2004), Fuck the Golden Youth (2005), Crazy? Yes! Dumb? No! (2006), Screens (2009), and Bad Buzz (2010). In New Zealand, The Mint Chicks were a critical and commercial success; the album Crazy? Yes! Dumb? No! won five awards at the 2007 Aotearoa Music Awards, including best rock album and album of the year, and was certified gold.

Nielson performed as a vocalist and later played the keyboard. The band became known for unpredictable and angry shows, with Nielson's onstage performance including "gymnastics [that] turned into death-defying climbs up PA systems and lighting rigs. He'd antagonise the audience and his bandmates alike, verbally and physically, over slights, real or imagined."

The Mint Chicks had a reputation for being provocative with chaotic shows, in part due to the tension between Nielson and Ruban, which came to a head during their last performance at the Bacco Room, a venue in Auckland. The show fell apart in an onstage outburst, with Nielson smashing multiple instruments and telling Ruban to "start your own fucking band". As a parting message to fans, the band's website was changed to a single page containing only that one line.

=== 2011–2013: Opossom ===
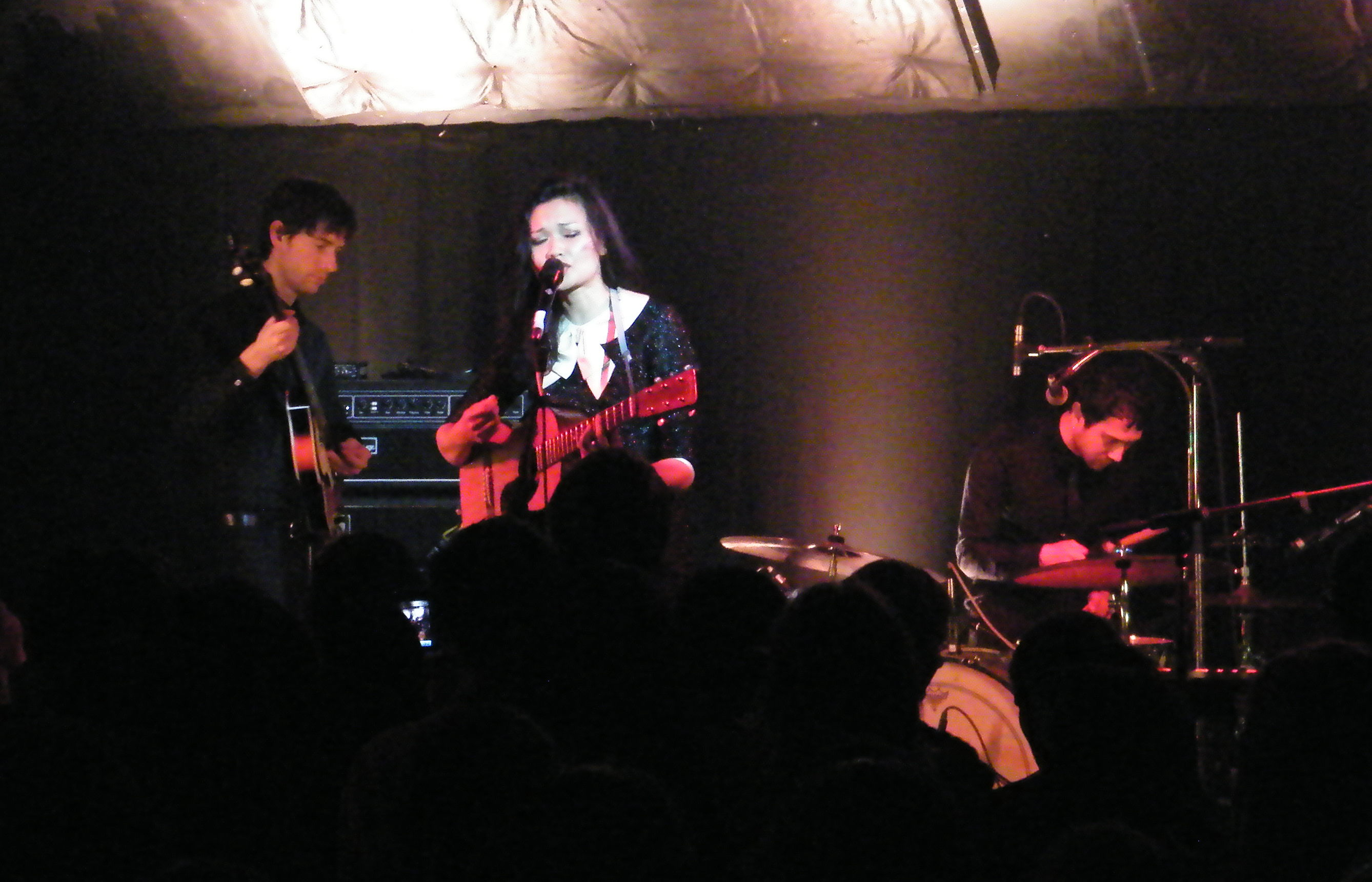
Nielson (right) with Runga and Logie in 2011

Following the breakup of The Mint Chicks, Nielson left Portland and arrived back in Auckland. He produced and contributed songwriting to Belle, Bic Runga's 2011 album. Along with former Mint Chicks bassist Michael Logie, the pair went on to form Opossom. By this time, Runga and Nielson were in a romantic relationship.

Nielson and Ruban began repairing their relationship in 2011. Opossom briefly toured with Ruban's new project, Unknown Mortal Orchestra, in a series of New Zealand shows. In 2012, Opossom debuted with their album Electric Hawaii, which was then short-listed for the 2013 Taite Music Prize. The album was described as "bright, clear psychedelia" and "sleekly designed indie pop" by Jayson Greene of Pitchfork.

Opossom was unable to continue into a full-time act due to Runga's other career projects and the couple's commitments to their children, and the band was put on hiatus. Nielson decided to continue in music with his own solo project (however the band did reunite to play a show in late 2020). In mid-2013, Nielson quietly released Devils, a 6-track instrumental album digitally published on Bandcamp; the album received positive reviews but remained relatively obscure.

=== 2014–present: Silicon and Unknown Mortal Orchestra ===
In 2014, Nielson reunited with his brother and worked on Unknown Mortal Orchestra's album Multi-Love (2015). During this time, Nielson also made a move into solo work, adopting the stage name Silicon.

In 2015, Nielson released Personal Computer, his debut solo album as a singer-songwriter, which then won the 2016 Taite Music Prize. The album reached 22 on the New Zealand album charts and spent 5 weeks on the top 20 Aotearoa albums charts, peaking at 4. Nielson toured in Auckland, London, Paris and Amsterdam, with multi-instrumentalist Julien Dyne helping play the music live.

In 2018 and 2021, Nielson released Birthday Suite and Birthday Suite Vol. II, respectively. The albums are instrumental and were released under his name as opposed to Silicon. That same year, Nielson signed on to join Unknown Mortal Orchestra, returning to playing with Ruban in an official capacity some eight years after The Mint Chicks.

== Personal life ==
Nielson is guarded about his private life, and has a reputation for dealing with media and journalists in humorous and nonsensical ways. Since about 2010, Nielson has been in a relationship with Bic Runga. They have three children, one from Runga's previous marriage, and two born around the mid-2010s.

In addition to music, Nielson also creates visual art, including painting 40 works for Personal Computer.

== Discography ==
=== Albums ===
- Personal Computer (2015)
- Birthday Suite (2018)
- Birthday Suite Vol. II (2021)

=== EPs ===
- Devils (2013)

=== Singles ===
- "God Emoji" (2015)
- "Burning Sugar" (2015)
- "Ruban's Birthday" (2018)

=== With Bic Runga and Chris Nielson as Opossom ===
- Electric Hawaii (2012)
