= II (Unknown Mortal Orchestra album) =

Studio album by Unknown Mortal Orchestra
- Released: 5 February 2013
- Recorded: 2012
- Genre: Indie rock; psychedelic rock; lo-fi
- Length: 40:25
- Label: Jagjaguwar
- Producer: Ruban Nielson

Unknown Mortal Orchestra chronology
Unknown Mortal Orchestra (2011)	II (2013)	Multi-Love (2015)

Singles from II
- 1. "Swim And Sleep (Like A Shark)" Released: 18 September 2012

II is the second studio album from the band Unknown Mortal Orchestra, released in February 2013. A 15-track Deluxe Edition was released in October, along with the EP Blue Record. A 10th anniversary special vinyl reissue was released on 17 November 2023.

== Artwork ==
The album cover is a photo of the British Wiccan high priestess author Janet Farrar taken by her husband Stewart Farrar.

== Critical reception ==
Professional ratings
Aggregate scores
Source	Rating
AnyDecentMusic?	7.7/10
Metacritic	78/100
Review scores
Source	Rating
AllMusic	4/5 stars
Financial Times	4/5 stars
The Guardian	4/5 stars
The Irish Times	3/5 stars
NME	8/10
The Observer	3/5 stars
Pitchfork	7.3/10
Q	3/5 stars
Rolling Stone	3.5/5 stars
Uncut	9/10

II received acclaim from most music critics. At Metacritic, which assigns a normalized rating out of 100 to reviews from mainstream critics, the album received an average score of 78, based on 27 reviews, which indicates "generally favorable reviews".

AllMusic gave the album four out of five stars, saying "from the opening moments of the trippy, lo-fi intro 'From the Sun' all the way to the funky-as-a-Hendrix-ballad closer 'Secret Xtians,' II takes risks and achieves greatness."

NME gave the album eight out of ten, saying "raw melody made Unknown Mortal Orchestra exciting two years ago; now they’ve matched it with attention to detail."

The Observer gave the album three out of five stars, described "Swim and Sleep (Like a Shark)" as "conjoin[ing] sleep, prettiness and unease", and the album as having "longueurs where Nielson can get a little vague and inward-directed."

II won Best Alternative Album in the 2013 New Zealand Music Awards.

== Track listing ==
All tracks are written by Ruban Nielson

No.	Title	Length
1.	"From the Sun"	4:43
2.	"Swim and Sleep (Like a Shark)"	2:45
3.	"So Good at Being in Trouble"	3:50
4.	"One at a Time"	2:28
5.	"The Opposite of Afternoon"	5:25
6.	"No Need for a Leader"	5:44
7.	"Monki"	7:18
8.	"Dawn"	1:08
9.	"Faded in the Morning"	4:21
10.	"Secret Xtians"	2:43
Total length:		40:25

Japanese edition bonus tracks
No.	Title	Length
11.	"Two Generations of Excess"	7:27
12.	"Waves of Confidence (Note: "Waves of Confidence" was previously included as the B-side on the "Swim and Sleep (Like a Shark)" tour-only 7" and later single release.)"	5:55
Total length:		53:47

=== Blue Record (EP) ===
Blue Record (and Deluxe version) cover

No.	Title	Length
1.	"Swim & Sleep (Like a Shark)" (acoustic version)	2:42
2.	"Faded in the Morning" (acoustic version)	3:29
3.	"So Good at Being in Trouble" (acoustic version)	3:30
4.	"Swing Lo Magellan" (Dirty Projectors cover)	2:47
5.	"Puttin' It Down" (Beck cover)	2:34
Total length:		15:02

== Personnel ==
- Ruban Nielson – performance, recording; drums (tracks 3, 10)
- Chris Nielson – horns (track 4)
- Jacob Portrait – bass (track 6)
- Gregory Rogove – drums (track 7)
- Kody Nielson – drums (tracks 1, 2, 4–6, 9)
- Joe Lambert – mastering
- Stewart Farrar – cover photo of Janet Farrar
