= Anti-Tiger =

EP by The Mint Chicks
- Released: 2004
- Recorded: 2004
- Genre: Indie rock, power pop, noise rock
- Length: 14:11 (EP)
- Label: Flying Nun Records MC1/FLR486/FNCD486 (7"/10"/CD)
- Producer: Ruban and Kody Neilson

The Mint Chicks chronology
Octagon, Octagon, Octagon (2003)	Anti-Tiger (2004)	Fuck the Golden Youth (2005)

Anti-Tiger is a studio album by The Mint Chicks released in 2004, published by Flying Nun Records. It is the second release from the band since their debut EP, Octagon, Octagon, Octagon (2003).

Anti-Tiger was issued in three formats: a 2-track 7"-single, a 6-track 10"-EP and a 6-track CD-EP. A music video was released for "Opium Of The People", and the song was also re-recorded for the Mint Chicks' first full-length, Fuck the Golden Youth (2005).

== Track listing ==
=== 7"-single ===
A:"Anti-Tiger" - 3:03
B:"Octagon, Octagon, Octagon (Live)"

=== 10"/CD-EP ===
1. "Prelude" - 1:25
2. "Blue Team Go!" - 1:27
3. "Anti-Tiger" - 3:03
4. "Opium Of The People" - 3:33
5. "Fake Up" - 1:30
6. "The Perfect Machine" - 3:13

Tracks 1, 2 and 3 by Kody Neilson. Tracks 4, 5 and 6 by Ruban and Kody Neilson.

== Personnel ==
- Paul Roper - Drums
- Michael Logie - Bass Guitar
- Kody Nielson - Vocals
- Ruban Nielson - Guitar
- Simon Lynch, Robert Stebbing - Mastering
