= Moa Brewing =

New Zealand brewery

Moa Brewing is a New Zealand brewery owned by Mallbeca Holdings Limited. It was founded in 2003 in Blenheim by Josh Scott and had an initial public offering in 2012. The company became notorious for its advertising campaigns which pitched the beer as “the domain of aspiring, affluent men”. It did not make a profit in any year since 2012, and was subsequently sold to Mallbeca in 2021. An industry commenter estimated that the sale price would barely cover the Moa Brewery's physical assets, meaning that the new owners valued the Moa brand at "essentially nothing".

== History ==
=== Creation ===
Moa Brewing was founded in Blenheim in 2003 by Josh Scott, the son of winemaker Allan Scott. Initially, the company was owned 50-50 by Josh and Allan.

=== Investment and controversy ===
In August or September 2010, two business incubators bought into the company and acquired 70 percent of it between them. This included investment firm The Business Bakery, which had been started by Geoff Ross.

Moa faced criticism shortly after for a promotion that suggested that low-carb beer was only for "queers". This included printing shirts with the slogan "Low Carb Beers" but with a pink Q over the B. Josh Scott, then the director, said that he had no idea the campaign was planned and only learned about it when he saw posts about it on the internet. Moa acknowledged the criticism, but did not take down the Facebook ads, and a year later posted pictures of staff wearing the shirts.

At some point, founder Josh Scott sold the company to Geoff Ross, who floated Moa on the stock exchange and turned it into a publicly listed company. Moa had an initial public offering in 2012, which was over-subscribed; after the IPO Moa was valued at NZ$38 million.

The shareholder prospectus for the IPO led to controversy itself, as it presented a “Mad Men”-like image, with photos of company directors dressed in suits alongside models in white blouses and short skirts, tips on achieving “moments of modern manhood”, ads for 'manly' companies such as Beretta rifles and Aston Martins, and a naked woman on a white horse advertising candles sold by Moa's then-CEO Geoff Ross. The hashtag "#momentsofmanhood" was mocked on social media. Another campaign in 2016 also faced criticism over a proposed advertising campaign, when a shareholder criticised the portrayal of women in a planned video ad.

In a 2018 article for Stuff, journalist Michael Donaldson said, "Moa has always made great beer, there's no question of that... But in the early years, as a public company, Moa resembled the old Peanuts character Pig-Pen, obliviously shrouded in a dust-storm of controversy, thanks to its grossly sexist marketing. That feels like ancient history now, with the brewery, although still blokey, adopting a lower-key approach that's more hunting-fishing-tramping." Kathleen Kuehn, a university media studies lecturer with a focus on the beer industry, found that Moa's general advertising campaigns went very poorly, especially with women. In particular, women in the beer industry that Kuehn interviewed would commonly raise Moa negatively and without prompting.

Initial plans to build their own brewery with the funds from their initial public offering were paused after the proposed brewery suffered from protracted negotiations over resource consenting issues. Moa subsequently boosted production through a contract with another brewery.

Moa's management and directors came under some criticism from Milford Asset Management, a NZ Fund manager, as the share price fell from its listing price of $1.25 to 55c in July 2014. In 2020 an auditor raised doubts that the brewery was a 'going concern'. As part of its 2020 annual report, Moa noted that it had shifted from glass bottles to cans for much of its range, which helped to improve market share, though it still reported an annual loss of $1.4 million.

=== Sale of 2021 ===
In 2021, Moa Brewing was sold for $1.9 million to Mallbeca Limited, a firm associated with its current chief executive, Stephen Smith. Prior to the sale, Moa Brewing was owned by Moa Group. Moa Group had purchased a hospitality company, Savor, in 2019, and when selling its brewing arm it announced that it would be continuing solely with the hospitality business and changed its name to Savor Limited.

In the decade prior to this sale, Moa had reported substantial losses. A beer industry commenter estimated that the sale price of $1.9 million would have barely covered the physical assets – the land where the brewery is sited, the plant, the taproom, and stock on hand – and so concluded that the Moa brand was valued at essentially nothing by the new owners.

Smith said in 2021 that Moa's history of advertising "made me sick" and said, "What they were thinking back then, only they can comment on. I think it was a pretty lazy way to attempt to disrupt and build the brand, personally.”

=== Present day ===
Moa Brewing is owned by Mallbeca Limited, a firm associated with Moa's current chief executive, Stephen Smith. It is privately owned and is no longer listed on any share market. Moa Brewing remains based out of Blenheim.

Mallbeca said in March 2021 that it is rebuilding the brand and business, that it wishes to move on quickly from the past, and that it will be taking the business back to its beginnings in Marlborough. Mallbeca said that Moa will develop "new and relevant beers to keep the innovation alive within the business", and that it is planning to re-enter the Australian market. Also in March 2021, Moa announced a partnership with Foodstuffs under which Moa beer and cider will exclusively be sold through Foodstuffs' wholesale, grocery and liquor stores.

Moa's Blenheim operations has its own cellar door. According to the cellar door manager in 2019, this had become one of the more profitable parts of the business.

== Notable staff ==
- Founder Josh Scott completed a Diploma in Viticulture and Wine Production from the Nelson Marlborough Institute of Technology and in 2015 he became New Zealand's only Certified Cicerone.
- In 2007, Moa Brewing hired David Nicholls, a former head brewer for Heineken, which included managing Heineken plants in Papua New Guinea and in Saint Lucia. Nicholls left Moa in November 2020 to start his own brewery.
- Current managing director and owner Stephen Smith was with Lion for over 15 years in senior executive roles in both New Zealand and Australia.

== Awards ==
Moa Brewing's Southern Alps White IPA won Champion New Zealand Beer at the 2018 New Zealand Beer Awards, an annual award ceremony by the Brewers Guild of New Zealand.
