= Bad Buzz =

EP by The Mint Chicks
- Released: 15 February 2010
- Recorded: 2009
- Genre: Indie rock, power pop, noise rock
- Length: 10:45
- Label: MusicHy.pe
- Producer: Ruban and Kody Nielson

The Mint Chicks chronology
Screens (2009)	Bad Buzz (2010)

Bad Buzz is the third EP by The Mint Chicks, released in February 2010. It was the last release by The Mint Chicks before the band abruptly split.

The band chose to publish digitally through Wellington-based startup MusicHy.pe after their ending their contract with Warner Music, and were one of the first acts to sign to the platform. The EP was released on a limited edition USB stick, designed by Ruban Nielson.

== Track listing ==
No.	Title	Length
1.	"Bad Buzz"	2:45
2.	"Say Goodbye"	3:38
3.	"ABC Reharmonised"	1:28
4.	"You've Got Spraypaint In Your Third Eye"	3:34

== Personnel ==
- Kody Nielson - vocals, keyboards, drums
- Ruban Nielson - guitar, bass
- Howie Weinberg - mastering
