= Crazy? Yes! Dumb? No! =

Studio album by The Mint Chicks
- Released: 2006 (New Zealand); September 9, 2008 (USA)
- Genres: pop punk, punk rock, noise rock, indie rock
- Length: 46:24
- Label: Flying Nun

The Mint Chicks chronology
Fuck the Golden Youth (2005)	Crazy? Yes! Dumb? No! (2006)	Mintunes (2008)

Professional ratings
Review scores
Source	Rating
Real Groove Magazine	(2006)
Spin	3.5/5 stars

Crazy? Yes! Dumb? No! is the second full-length album released by The Mint Chicks and was originally released in New Zealand on Flying Nun, part of Warner Music NZ. The album was produced by singer Kody, guitarist Ruban Nielson, and their father Chris Nielson. Despite its humble beginnings (the album was recorded between Kody Nielson's garage and his father's bedroom) the album dominated the Vodafone New Zealand Music Awards 2007, earning five awards as well as achieving Gold status in the Chicks' home country of New Zealand. The album was also released in the US through Milan Records on September 9, 2008.

In the December 2009 issue of Real Groove magazine, Crazy? Yes! Dumb? No! was named the New Zealand album of the decade and the title track the New Zealand single of the decade.

In 2026, Independent Music New Zealand named the album as the winner of the annual IMNZ Classic Record Award, to be presented at that year's Taite Music Prize ceremony. Records become eligible 20 years after they are released, meaning that Crazy? Yes! Dumb? No! was recognised as soon as possible.

== Track listing ==
All songs composed by Kody Nielson and Ruban Nielson; "If My Arm Was A Mic Stand, Would You Hold My Hand?" written by Michael Logie and Kody Nielson.

1. "Ockham's Razor" – 4:26
2. "This Is Your Last Chance to Be Famous, My Love" – 4:02
3. "Welcome to Nowhere" – 2:56
4. "You're Just as Confused as I Am" – 2:42
5. "Walking Off a Cliff Again" – 2:11
6. "Don't Turn Me on Just to Turn on Me" – 1:56
7. "Funeral Day" – 3:36
8. "Real Friends" – 2:23
9. "She's Back on Crack" – 1:48
10. "Crazy? Yes! Dumb? No!" – 4:40
11. "If My Arm Was a Mic Stand, Would You Hold My Hand?" – 2:37
12. "Sleeping During the Day" – 3:25
13. "Ammie" – 2:54
14. "100 Minutes of Silence" – 6:14

== Singles ==
1. "Crazy? Yes! Dumb? No!" (April 2007)
2. "Welcome to Nowhere" (June 2007)
3. "Sleeping During the Day" (July 2007)
4. "Walking Off a Cliff Again" (October 2007)
5. "If My Arm Was a Mic Stand, Would You Hold My Hand?" (January 2008)
6. "She's Back on Crack" (March 2008)

== Awards for Crazy? Yes! Dumb? No! ==
Award	Awarded at	Other contenders in category
Album of the Year	New Zealand Music Awards '07	Brooke Fraser, Evermore, Hollie Smith, Opshop
Best Group	New Zealand Music Awards '07	Evermore, Opshop
Best Rock Album	New Zealand Music Awards '07	Evermore, Opshop
Best Music Video ("Crazy? Yes! Dumb? No!", dir: Sam Peacocke)	New Zealand Music Awards '07	Liam Finn ("Second Chance", dir: Angus Sutherland/Liam Finn), Opshop ("Maybe", dir: Stephen Tolfrey)
Best Album Cover (designed by Ruban Nielson)	New Zealand Music Awards '07	Dimmer (There My Dear, designed by Dylan Pharazyn), John Psathas (View from Olympus, designed by Tim Gummer)
IMNZ Classic Record Award	2026 Taite Music Prize	(Awarded directly - No other nominees)
