= Unknown Mortal Orchestra =

Oregon-based New Zealand psychedelic rock band

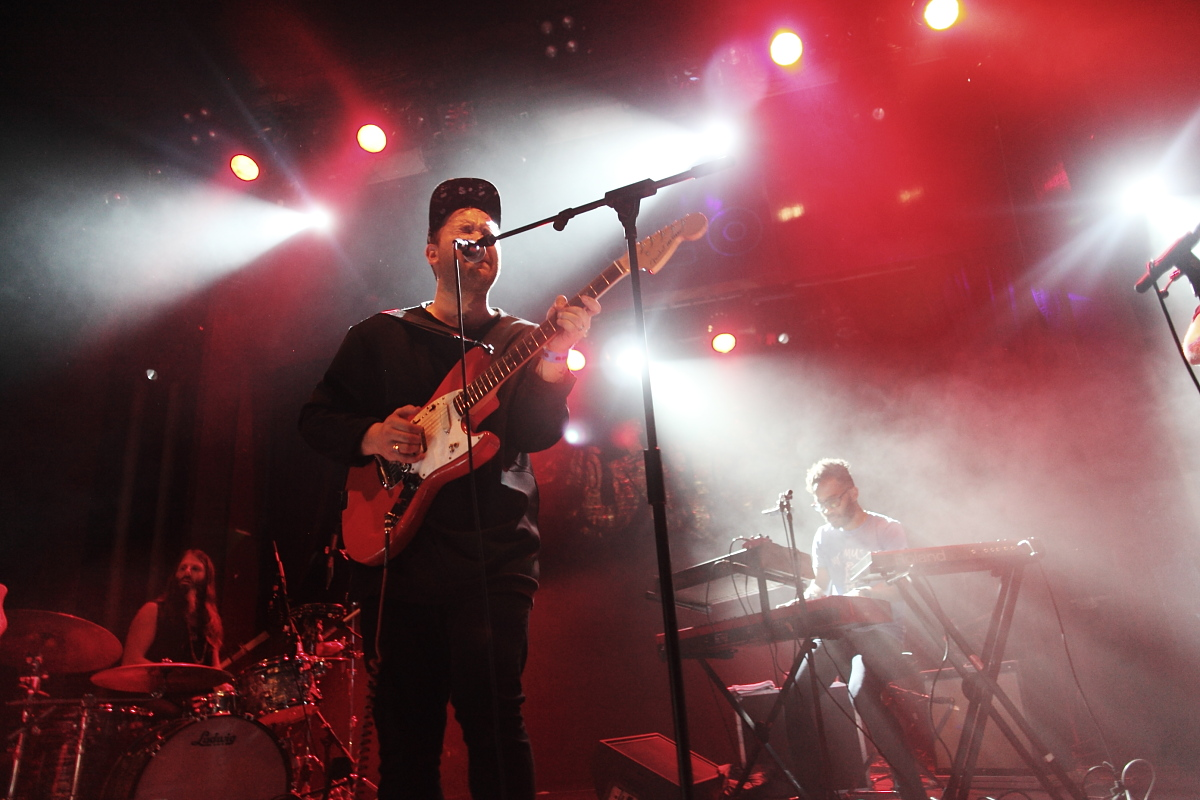
- Unknown Mortal Orchestra performing at Sala Apolo in Barcelona, Spain in 2015

Background information
- Origin: Auckland, New Zealand; Portland, Oregon, U.S.
- Genres: Psychedelic rock; R&B; indie rock; garage rock; lo-fi; psychedelic pop
- Years active: 2009–present
- Labels: Fat Possum; Jagjaguwar
- Spinoff of: The Mint Chicks
- Members: Ruban Nielson; Jacob Portrait; Kody Nielson
- Past members: Julien Ehrlich; Greg Rogove; Riley Geare; Amber Baker; Thomas Mabus
- Website: unknownmortalorchestra.com

Unknown Mortal Orchestra (also known as UMO) is a New Zealand psychedelic rock band from Auckland and now based in Portland, Oregon. Fronted by multi-instrumentalist Ruban Nielson, assisted by his brother Kody Nielson and bassist Jacob Portrait, Nielson started the band in 2009, initially as a solo project. The band's first album was released in 2011 on Fat Possum Records.

== History ==
=== Inception ===
After forming The Mint Chicks in Auckland and experiencing success with them, Ruban Nielson moved to the United States in 2007. The singer and guitarist released the track "Ffunny Ffrends" on his anonymous Bandcamp profile on 17 May 2010. No further information was provided and no mention of who created it. Within a day, the song had received significant coverage from independent music blogs such as Pitchfork. Through their reposting and attempts to hunt down the creator, Nielson eventually claimed the track as Unknown Mortal Orchestra's.

=== Unknown Mortal Orchestra ===
The band's debut self-titled album was released 21 June 2011 on Fat Possum Records. The album received critical acclaim. Nielson promoted a 'Kiwi Edition' of the album on his Instagram, which includes a bonus track. Pitchfork gave the album an 8.1, describing that with "an expert use of space rare for such a lo-fi record, UMO manages a unique immersive and psychedelic quality without relying on the usual array of bong-ripping effects."

In the spring of 2012, the band won the Taite Music Prize for the album. Although the nominated Unknown Mortal Orchestra did not win Best Alternative Album, Nielson took home the title of Best Male Artist at the 47th annual Vodafone New Zealand Music Awards.

=== II ===
In September 2012, Unknown Mortal Orchestra announced that they had signed to Jagjaguwar and were working on their second full-length album. Unknown Mortal Orchestra's second album, II, was released on 5 February 2013. The first single from the album, entitled "Swim and Sleep (Like a Shark)", was first available as a 7" on their tour with Grizzly Bear.

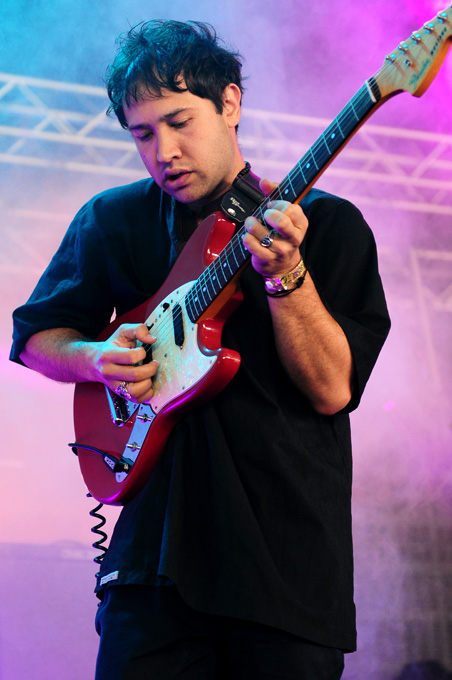
Ruban Nielson

II has received critical acclaim. In November 2013 it won Best Alternative Album at the New Zealand Music Awards. II was nominated for the Taite Music Prize 2014, an annual music prize awarded for the best album from New Zealand. Clash Music gave the album a 9 out of 10, saying "from opener 'From The Sun', which recalls George Harrison-psychedelia, to the tender Family Stone shuffle of the closing of 'Secret Xtians', 'II' displays both a glowing warmth in its production and a deft use of space that illuminate Nielson's superbly crafted compositions." Paste magazine called the album "a modern, beat-heavy take on '60s psych, with plenty of hooks and fuzz to get you hooked and feeling fuzzy." NME praised Ruban's ability to turn his songs into "works of warm, fuzzy beauty."

In late 2012, Unknown Mortal Orchestra capitalized on the success of II and embarked on a world tour. The tour started off with shows in Australia, and hometown shows in New Zealand, followed by several stops in Europe. The band toured extensively throughout North America with opener Foxygen. In March 2013, Unknown Mortal Orchestra was named one of Fuse TV's 30 must-see artists at SXSW. Unknown Mortal Orchestra consistently sold-out shows in both Europe and in North America, and as a result of their success on the road they announced in early April that they would extend their tour through the end of 2013. That summer the band performed at a number of major European festivals, including Roskilde Festival, Pukkelpop and Lowlands.

On 25 February 2013, Unknown Mortal Orchestra made their American television debut, performing "So Good At Being in Trouble" on Late Night with Jimmy Fallon.

On 29 October 2013, the band released an EP titled Blue Record. It included three acoustic versions of songs taken from their previous album.

=== Multi-Love ===
On 5 February 2015, the band announced their third studio album, Multi-Love. They released the title track as the first single, which was designated "Best New Track" by Pitchfork. Multi-Love was released on 26 May 2015. It was well received by critics. Rolling Stone commented that "Multi-Love sees Nielson coloring outside the lines for a vibrant vision of connection" and Pitchfork praised Nielson's ear for how something should sound and referred to the album as his "most accomplished." Singles "Multi-Love" and "Can't Keep Checking My Phone" were both A-listed at BBC Radio 6 Music.

Following the release, UMO embarked on a tour through Europe, the US and Canada, with many sold out dates. On 12 August, UMO performed "Multi-Love" on Late Night with Seth Meyers. On 25 August they performed "Can't Keep Checking My Phone" on Conan. On 16 February 2016 the band performed on Last Call with Carson Daly. "Can't Keep Checking My Phone" also appears in the association football video game FIFA 16.

=== Sex & Food and IC-01 Hanoi ===
The band's fourth studio album, Sex & Food, was released on 6 April 2018, garnering a lot of praise from critics.

In a review in Reflektor Magazine, the following was said: "The consistent thread through the UMO catalog remains strong; frontman Ruban Nielson spins a soulful vocal over a backdrop of melodically rich music and slick rhythm. This album builds on many of the synthesizers and sampled drum textures introduced on the previous breakout LP Multi-Love in 2015, but offers a different ride. The entire album was covertly previewed in SB-05, the 2017 installment of a Christmas Day instrumental/ambient track released digitally for free. Upon first listen, Sex & Food reveals each song in its full form, a pleasant surprise." In July, the BBC Radio & 6Music named Sex & Food one of the best albums released in 2018.

Following the release, the band set out on a global tour with stops in North America, Europe, UK, Asia, New Zealand and Australia, with many sold out dates. In September 2018, they announced the release of an instrumental album that originated from the sessions for Sex & Food, titled IC-01 Hanoi. It was released on 26 October 2018.

=== V ===
On 25 June 2021, the band released "Weekend Run", its first proper single since 2018's Sex & Food. The song was released via the band's long time label Jagjaguwar. Of the new song, Ruban Nielson said "At the end of the day I don't take for granted that I have the perfect job -- I truly work to make music that will set someone's day right and I think that shines through on 'Weekend Run.'" Later on 4 August, they released a second single "That Life".

On 25 October 2022, the band announced a 2023 US/UK tour in support of a forthcoming double album and released the single "I Killed Captain Cook". On 2 February 2023, the band announced the double album V, which was released on 17 March 2023 via Jagjaguwar, and released the single "Layla". On 21 February, “Nadja”, the fifth single from V was released.

== Members ==
Current

- Ruban Nielson – lead vocals, guitar, drums, bass, piano, keyboards, synthesizers (2009–present)
- Jacob Portrait – bass, synthesizers, backing vocals (2010–present)
- Kody Nielson – drums, percussion, synthesizers, backing vocals (2013–present)

Current touring musicians

- Christian Li – keyboards, backing vocals (2022–present)
- Zack James - drums (2025-present)

Former

- Julien Ehrlich – drums (2010–2012)
- Gregory Rogove – drums, backing vocals (2012–2013)
- Riley Geare – drums, backing vocals (2013–2017)
- Amber Baker – drums (2017–2018)
- Thomas "Mabus" Hoganson – keyboards, synthesizers, backing vocals (2018)

Former touring musicians

- Quincy McCrary – keyboards, synthesizers, backing vocals (2015–2018; 2019)
- Chris Nielson – keyboards, synthesizers, saxophone, backing vocals (2018–2019)

== Discography ==
=== Studio albums ===
List of studio albums with selected chart positions and certifications
Title	Album details	Peak chart positions									
Title	Album details	NZ	AUS	BEL (Fla.)	BEL (Wa.)	NLD	SCO	UK	UK Indie	US	US Indie
Unknown Mortal Orchestra	Released: 21 June 2011; Label: Fat Possum; Format: CD, LP, cassette, digital download	35	—	—	—	—	—	—	—	— (Note: Unknown Mortal Orchestra did not enter the Billboard 200, but peaked at number 39 on Top Heatseekers chart.)	—
II	Released: 5 February 2013; Label: Jagjaguwar; Format: CD, LP, cassette, digital download	38	— (Note: II did not enter the Australian ARIA Albums Chart but peaked at number five on the ARIA Hitseekers Chart.)	120	—	96	—	122	17	170	26
Multi-Love	Released: 26 May 2015; Label: Jagjaguwar; Format: CD, LP, cassette, digital download	14	45	70	158	37	57	44	5	98	7
Sex & Food	Released: 6 April 2018; Label: Jagjaguwar; Format: CD, LP, cassette, digital download	9	76	63	—	98	50	56	10	188	12
V	Released: 17 March 2023; Label: Jagjaguwar; Format: 2×LP, CD, cassette, digital download	7	97	—	—	—	32	— (Note: V did not enter the UK Albums Chart, but peaked at number 22 on the UK Album Sales Chart.)	8	— (Note: V did not enter the US Billboard 200, but peaked at number 31 on the US Billboard Album Sales Chart.)	—
"—" denotes releases that did not chart or were not released in that territory.

=== Instrumental albums ===
List of instrumental albums, with details
Title	Details
IC-01 Hanoi	Released: 26 October 2018; Label: Jagjaguwar; Format: CD, LP, cassette, digital download
IC-02 Bogotá	Released: 28 March 2025; Label: Jagjaguwar; Format: LP, digital download

=== Extended plays ===
- Blue Record (2013)
- Curse (2025)

=== Instrumental EPs ===
- SB-01 (2013)
- SB-02 (2014)
- SB-03 (2015)
- SB-04 (2016)
- SB-05 (2017)
- SB-06 (2019)
- SB-07 (2019)
- SB-08 (2020)
- SB-09 (2021)
- SB-10 (2022)

=== Singles ===
==== As lead artist ====
List of singles, with selected chart positions, showing year released and album name
Title	Year	Peak chart positions					Certifications	Album
Title	Year	NZ Hot	NZ Artist Heat.	BEL (Fla.) Tip	MEX Air.	UK Sales	Certifications	Album
"Ffunny Ffrends"	2010	—	—	—	31	—		Unknown Mortal Orchestra
"Thought Ballune"	2010	—	—	—	49	—		Unknown Mortal Orchestra
"How Can You Luv Me"	2011	—	—	—	—	—		Unknown Mortal Orchestra
"Satanic Planet"	2012	—	—	—	—	—		Space Ducks: Soundtrack
"I'll Come Back 4 U"	2012	—	—	—	—	—		Adult Swim Singles Program 2012
"So Good at Being in Trouble"	2013	—	—	—	—	—	RMNZ: Platinum; RIAA: Gold	II
"Swim and Sleep (Like a Shark)"	2013	—	—	—	48	—		II
"From the Sun"	2013	—	—	—	—	—		II
"Multi-Love"	2015	—	—	25	44	—	RMNZ: Gold	Multi-Love
"Can't Keep Checking My Phone"	2015	—	—	84	—	36		Multi-Love
"First World Problem"	2016	—	—	—	44	—		Non-album single
"Shakedown Street"	2016	—	—	—	—	—		Day of the Dead
"American Guilt"	2018	—	1	—	34	—		Sex & Food
"Not in Love We're Just High"	2018	—	5	—	—	—		Sex & Food
"Hunnybee"	2018	—	—	—	36	—	RMNZ: Gold; RIAA: Gold	Sex & Food
"Hanoi 6"	2018	—	—	—	—	—		IC-01 Hanoi
"Weekend Run"	2021	34	4	—	—	—		V
"That Life"	2021	—	11	—	—	—		V
"I Killed Captain Cook"	2022	—	13	—	—	—		V
"Layla"	2023	—	10	—	—	—		V
"Nadja"	2023	—	13	—	—	—		V
"Meshuggah"	2023	28	2	—	—	—		V
"Earth 1"	2025	—	—	—	—	—		IC-02 Bogotá
"Boys With The Characteristics Of Wolves"	2025	—	—	—	—	—		Curse
"—" denotes a recording that did not chart or was not released in that territory.

==== As featured artist ====
List of singles as featured artist showing year released, certifications and album name
Title	Year	Certifications	Album
"Beauty & Essex" (Free Nationals featuring Daniel Caesar and Unknown Mortal Orchestra)	2019	RMNZ: Gold	Free Nationals
"Too Sweet" (India Shawn featuring Unknown Mortal Orchestra)	2021		Before We Go (Deeper)
"Chaise Longue" (Unknown Mortal Orchestra Remix) (Wet Leg featuring Unknown Mortal Orchestra)	2023		Non-album single
"Summer of Luv" (Portugal. The Man featuring Unknown Mortal Orchestra)	2023		Chris Black Changed My Life

=== Other charted songs ===
List of songs, with selected chart positions, showing year released and album name
Title	Year	Peak chart positions	Album
Title	Year	NZ Artist Heat.	Album
"Everyone Acts Crazy Nowadays"	2018	4	Sex & Food
"A God Called Hubris"	2018	1	Sex & Food
"Ministry of Alienation"	2018	2	Sex & Food

== Awards and nominations ==
Year	Nominee / work	Award	Result	Ref.
2012	Unknown Mortal Orchestra	Taite Prize, Independent Music New Zealand	Won	
2013	II	Album of the Year, New Zealand Music Awards	Nominated	
2013	"So Good at Being in Trouble"	Single of the Year, New Zealand Music Awards	Nominated	
2015	Ruban Nielson and Kody Nielson for "Multi-Love"	APRA Silver Scroll	Won	
2015	Multi-Love	Best Alternative Album, New Zealand Music Awards	Won	
2015	"Multi-Love"	Best Single, New Zealand Music Awards	Nominated	
2016	Multi-Love	Taite Prize, Independent Music New Zealand	Nominated	
2019	Sex & Food	Best Foreign Album, Sweden GAFFA Awards	Nominated	
