= Fuck the Golden Youth =

Album by The Mint Chicks

Studio album by The Mint Chicks
- Released: 2005
- Genre: Punk rock, power pop, no wave
- Length: 36:06
- Label: Flying Nun

The Mint Chicks chronology
Anti-Tiger (2004)	Fuck the Golden Youth (2005)	Crazy? Yes! Dumb? No! (2006)

Fuck the Golden Youth is the first full-length album released by The Mint Chicks on the Flying Nun label. The album was produced by singer Kody and Guitarist Ruban Nielson and recorded by the band in total isolation in a house on a beach in Northland, New Zealand which was inaccessible except at low tide.

== Track listing ==
All tracks were written by Kody Nielson, Ruban Nielson, and Micheal Logie

Tracks 1, 2, 4, 7, 8, 10, 12 composed by Kody Nielson.
Tracks 3, 11, 13 composed by Ruban Nielson.
Tracks 6, 9 composed by Kody Nielson and Ruban Nielson.
Track 5 composed by Kody Nielson, Ruban Nielson and Michael Logie.

1. "Fat Gut Strut" – 3:10
2. "Rubbage Rat" – 1:02
3. "Fuck the Golden Youth" – 1:46
4. "A Quick Show of Hands" – 3:24
5. "Nothing is a Switch" – 3:23
6. "Opium of the People" – 3:03
7. "Take It, I Don't Want It" – 2:39
8. "My Arpeggio" – 2:06
9. "Licking Letters" – 2:02
10. "Silver Homeless Man" – 3:03
11. "So Many of You, So Few of Us" – 1:34
12. "I Don't Want to Grow Old" – 2:34
13. "You're Bored Because You're Boring" – 5:49
