= The Mint Chicks =

New Zealand band

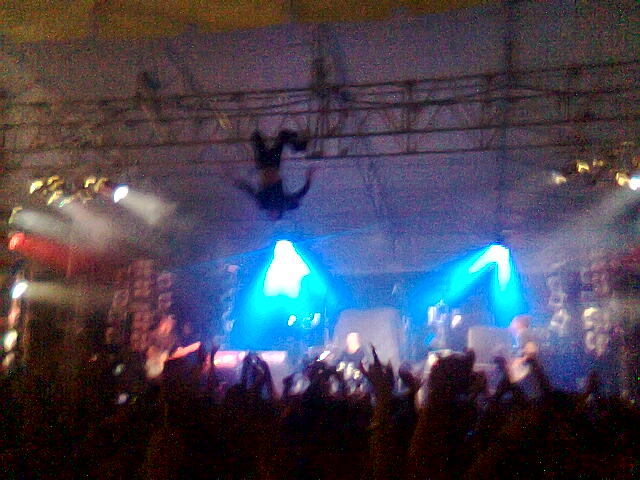
- Kody Nielson hangs upside down over the stage during a performance at Auckland University of Technology

Background information
- Origin: Auckland, New Zealand
- Genres: Pop punk; noise rock; art punk; garage rock; garage punk; post-hardcore
- Years active: 2001–2010
- Labels: Flying Nun; Warner Music Group
- Past members: Ruban Nielson; Kody Nielson; Paul Roper; Michael Logie
- Website: themintchicks.com

The Mint Chicks were a New Zealand noise rock and art punk group (the band began to refer to their style of music as "troublegum" and have been referred to as anything from neo-punk to schizo-pop to the only half-serious genre definition of shit-gaze). The band is originally from Auckland and relocated to Portland, Oregon, USA in 2007.

== History ==
Meeting in high school, the band formed in 2001, and began by playing punk house parties and low profile shows before being discovered by acclaimed New Zealand independent record label Flying Nun Records. They released two EPs and three albums under the Flying Nun Records banner: Octagon, Octagon, Octagon EP (2003), Anti-Tiger EP (2004), Fuck the Golden Youth (2005), Crazy? Yes! Dumb? No! (2006) and Screens (2009), as well as one EP on a minor label, Bad Buzz (2010). All were produced and recorded by the band's core members Ruban and Kody Nielson, with the exception of Crazy? Yes! Dumb? No! which was produced by the Nielson brothers and their father Chris Nielson at two different home studios.

All four original band members met at Orewa College in Orewa, New Zealand, although the band starting moving between Portland, Oregon and Auckland, as the Nielson brothers have dual citizenship in New Zealand and the U.S.

In 2006, the band played support for the Yeah Yeah Yeahs. The volume of the show was reportedly so loud that part of the St James theater complex fell down, injuring two concert goers. They have also played support slots for The White Stripes, Death From Above 1979, TV on the Radio, The Blood Brothers, The Black Lips, and The Bronx. They were also part of the New Zealand line-up for Big Day Out 2004, 2005, 2007 and 2009. In 2005, it was notable that Kody Nielson wielded a chainsaw on stage and destroyed a corporate sponsor's overly prominent sign with it.

At the 2007 New Zealand Music Awards the band won five Tui awards including best rock group, best album, best rock album as well as winning best album cover and best music video for the single "Crazy? Yes! Dumb? No!".

On 24 October 2007, it was announced on the band's website that their bassist Michael Logie would leave the band when they relocated to Portland. The group continued as a trio, with Logie relocating to London, England. The band played a free show in Portland on 29 June 2008, in which they played their then-upcoming third album from beginning to end live. The band later supported Shihad on the July 2008 Beautiful Machine Tour and tested their new songs in front of a home audience. As a result of their bass player having left the band, the Mint Chicks weren't able to play hits from earlier songs, angering some fans. To counter this Shihad's bass player, Karl Kippenberger, filled in for several more popular songs.

On 25 December 2008, The Mint Chicks released the Mintunes EP consisting of "8-bit versions" of both previously released songs and tracks from the upcoming album. The band also released an iTunes-only single during 2008, "Life Will Get Better Some Day", a teaser for the album "Screens", which was released in New Zealand on 16 March 2009 after having been recorded sporadically over the preceding two years.

In October 2009 the Mint Chicks performed a rendition of Ray Columbus and the Invaders' classic hit She's a Mod at the New Zealand Music awards as a four-piece band, later released as a standalone single. Shortly afterwards on 16 October 2009, it was announced Michael Logie would be rejoining the band in a post on the band's Twitter. The band joined with New Zealand music website MusicHy.pe to promote their next record, the Bad Buzz EP, released in February 2010.

Shortly after the release of the EP, the band played their final show on 12 March 2010. The show, originally a fundraiser for MusicHy.pe, ended in chaos after Kody Nielson destroyed the two drumkits and equipment, imploring the crowd to "start your own fucking band".

== Post-breakup activity ==
Singer Kody Nielson is making music under the alias Opossom with former bassist Michael Logie and Bic Runga and also as a solo artist under the name Silicon. Guitarist Ruban Nielson now fronts Unknown Mortal Orchestra with producer Jacob Portrait. Kody Nielson later joined the band, and has been the drummer for Unknown Mortal Orchestra since 2013. Michael Logie continues his solo project F In Math as well as playing bass for fellow New Zealand band Die! Die! Die!. Paul Roper plays drums in Portland band Blouse.

== Band members ==
- Ruban Nielson (guitar, vocals)
- Kody Nielson (vocals, keyboards, drums)
- Paul Roper (drums)
- Michael Logie (bass) (except 2008)

== Discography ==
- Fuck the Golden Youth (2005)
- Crazy? Yes! Dumb? No! (2006)
- Screens (2009)

== Awards ==
Year	Nominee / work	Award	Result
2007	Crazy? Yes! Dumb? No! – The Mint Chicks	New Zealand Music Awards – Album of the Year	Won
2007	The Mint Chicks	New Zealand Music Awards – Best Group	Won
2007	Crazy? Yes! Dumb? No! – The Mint Chicks	New Zealand Music Awards – Best Rock Album	Won
2007	Sam Peacocke – "Crazy? Yes! Dumb? No!" (The Mint Chicks)	New Zealand Music Awards – Best Music Video	Won
2007	Chris Nielson, Kody Nielson, Ruban Nielson – Crazy? Yes! Dumb? No! (The Mint Chicks)	New Zealand Music Awards – Best Producer	Nominated
2007	Ruban Nielson – Crazy? Yes! Dumb? No! (The Mint Chicks)	New Zealand Music Awards – Best Album Cover	Won
2009	Screens – The Mint Chicks	New Zealand Music Awards – Album of the Year	Nominated
2009	The Mint Chicks	New Zealand Music Awards – Best Group	Nominated
2009	Sam Peacocke "I Can't Stop Being Foolish" (The Mint Chicks)	New Zealand Music Awards – Best Music Video	Nominated
2009	Screens – The Mint Chicks	New Zealand Music Awards – Best Rock Album	Nominated
2009	Ruban Nielson – Screens (The Mint Chicks)	New Zealand Music Awards – Best Album Cover	Won
