= Screens (album) =

Studio album by The Mint Chicks
- Released: 16 March 2009 (New Zealand)
- Genre: Punk rock, power pop, no wave, noise pop
- Length: 29:53
- Label: Flying Nun

The Mint Chicks chronology
| Mintunes (2008) | Screens (2009) | Bad Buzz (2010) |

Singles from Screens
- 1. "I Can't Stop Being Foolish" Released: 2 March 2009; 2. "Hot On Your Heels" Released: June 2009; 3. "Don't Sell Your Brain Out, Baby" Released: August 2009

Professional ratings
Review scores
| Source | Rating |
|---|---|
| Polaroids of Androids | 10/10 stars |
| Real Groove Magazine | (2009) |

Screens is the third and final studio album from Auckland-based "troublegum" group The Mint Chicks and thus far the only Mint Chicks release not to feature bassist Michael Logie. It was released on 16 March 2009 in New Zealand, The Mint Chicks' homeland on Flying Nun Records. It was mixed in Portland, Oregon by the Nielson brothers and Jacob Portrait, with additional mixing by Chris Nielson in Auckland, New Zealand.

The album's first single was "I Can't Stop Being Foolish". Sam Peacocke, the New Zealand music award winning director responsible for the band's videos for "Walking Off a Cliff Again" and "Crazy? Yes! Dumb? No!" filmed a new video for the single, which hit number 1 on the bFM chart on 4 February 2009 and stayed at this position for 2 weeks.

On 25 December 2008, an EP called Mintunes was offered for free download on The Mint Chicks' website including 8-bit versions of four songs to appear on Screens, including the then-unreleased "Red, White or Blue" and "Screens".

On 20 December 2008, a video for "Enemies" made by band member Ruban Neilson appeared on The Mint Chicks' website, YouTube and Vimeo. On 1 January 2009, a similar video for the track "Life Will Get Better Some Day" created by Kody Neilson was released on YouTube.

On 20 February 2009, New Zealand on Air released a list of songs granted funding for a video, among which was The Mint Chicks' track "Don't Sell Your Brain Out, Baby". The song was added by bFM on 4 May 2009 and went to number one on the bFM top ten on 6 May, the fifth bFM number-one from Screens.

== Track listing ==
1. "Red, White or Blue" – 3:53
2. "2010" – 2:37
3. "Hot on Your Heels" – 2:00
4. "Don't Sell Your Brain Out, Baby" – 2:06
5. "I Can't Stop Being Foolish" – 2:45
6. "What a Way" – 3:30
7. "Screens" – 2:30
8. "Sweet Janine" – 2:36 (feat. Finn Andrews from The Veils)
9. "Telephone" – 1:49
10. "Enemies" – 2:52
11. "Life Will Get Better Some Day" – 3:18
12. "Dying Is for Suckers and Old People" (iTunes pre-order bonus) – 1:15

== Awards for Screens ==
| Award | Awarded at | Other contenders in category |
|---|---|---|
| Best Album Cover (designed by Ruban Nielson) | New Zealand Music Awards '09 | Midnight Youth (The Brave Don't Run, designed by Sam Yong); Fat Freddy's Drop (Dr Boondigga & The Big BW, designed by Otis Frizzell) |
