= Ruban Nielson =

New Zealand musician (born 1980)

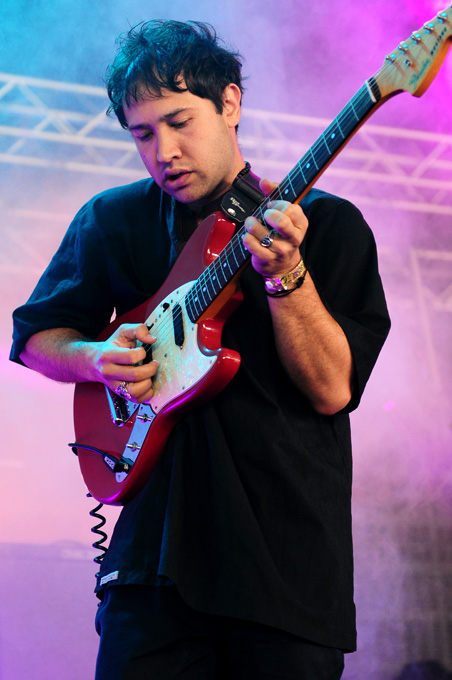
- Nielson performing with Unknown Mortal Orchestra at Southbound in Busselton, Western Australia
- Born: 20 February 1980 (age 46); Darwin, Northern Territory, Australia
- Occupations: Musician; singer; songwriter
- Years active: 2001–present
- Spouse: Jenny Nielson
- Children: 2
- Musical career
- Genres: Psychedelic rock; R&B; garage rock; lo-fi; power pop; noise rock
- Instruments: Vocals; guitar; bass guitar; keyboards; drums; percussion; cello
- Member of: Unknown Mortal Orchestra
- Formerly of: The Mint Chicks

Ruban Nielson (Note: Written in some sources as Ruben Nielsen) (born 20 February 1980) is a New Zealand musician, singer and songwriter, and the frontman of the psychedelic rock band Unknown Mortal Orchestra. He has won two Aotearoa Music Awards, an APRA Silver Scroll, and a Taite Music Prize over the course of his band's five studio albums and one extended play.

Born in Darwin, Australia, to a Hawaiian mother, Nielson was raised in Orewa, Auckland in a musical family. Nielson attended Elam, and graduated in 2002 as a recipient of the Sir James Wallace art award, one year after forming The Mint Chicks with Paul Roper, Michael Logie and his brother Kody Nielson. The four members met at Orewa College, although the band started moving between Portland, Oregon, where Nielson would later be based, and Auckland. The band, known for its nihilistic ideology, disorderly behaviour and neo-punk elements, broke up following Ruban's departure. Nielson subsequently formed a more experimental and psychedelic band, Unknown Mortal Orchestra, with musician Jake Portrait. His brother Kody also has performed drums on almost every Unknown Mortal Orchestra album.

Nielson achieved critical acclaim and success worldwide with the band's self-titled debut album Unknown Mortal Orchestra, released in 2011. The album won the 2012 Taite Music Prize. Further success came with II, released in 2013. Nielson's third album Multi-Love, which made it high onto lists by The Guardian, NME and Consequence of Sound for the best albums of 2015. Singles "Multi-Love" and "Can't Keep Checking My Phone" were both A-listed at BBC's 6 Music. Two more albums, Sex + Food, and the instrumental IC-01 Hanoi, followed in 2018.

Nielson lives in the United States with his family. He has become part of the revival of psychedelic music in Australasia, alongside the likes of Tame Impala, Connan Mockasin, LEISURE and Pond. NME has summed up Nielson as a master in creating "works of warm, fuzzy beauty."

== Early life ==
Nielson was born in Darwin, Australia on 20 February 1980. His mother is an American hula dancer from Oahu, Hawaii and his father is New Zealand Māori brass player and Elam School of Fine Arts alumni, Chris Nielson, who toured with lounge singer John Rowles in the 1970s and has played in New Zealand bands such as Katchafire. With his mother being a Native Hawaiian woman (Kānaka Maoli), there was an instant cultural connection with Nielson's Māori father; the two ethnic groups are closely connected. The two met on tour in Los Angeles, and later had another son, Kody (born 9 May 1982), who later became a musician alongside Nielson. The transpacific couple moved to Auckland when Nielson was young, where he grew up and regards as his home. Chris Nielson collaborated with his sons on Unknown Mortal Orchestra's 2018 album, IC-01 Hanoi, playing the flügelhorn and saxophone.

Nielson grew up in Orewa. Home life was difficult due to his father's chronic alcoholism and heroin addiction, and the fallout from his parents' separation. As a teenager, Nielson developed insomnia, and was unable to sleep at night; this affected his academic performance. Despite his addictions, his father cared for his children, and felt guilty about his illnesses and choices affecting them. As he weaned himself off heroin and alcohol, he made amends with his son by buying him his first guitar and getting recommendations from his Orewa College teachers to get him into Elam School of Fine Arts, New Zealand's most prestigious art school. He graduated in 2002 with distinction, winning a Sir James Wallace art award. When listed in the University of Auckland's 40 under 40 list in 2020, Nielson said of his father and Elam:

"His stories of Elam when I was a kid really stoked my desire to be there. He helped me get into Elam and negotiate what was originally a kind of ‘probational situation’ with my acceptance. Being at Elam really fulfilled a childhood dream and people like Nuala Gregory, Peter Shand, Jim Speers, Leigh Martin, Judy Millar and Denys Watkins as well as many others all had a huge impact on the way I see the world and creativity.”

He maintains an interest in the visual arts, and says that if he had not entered music as a profession he would have become a visual artist.

== The Mint Chicks (2001–10) ==
The Nielson brothers, Ruban and Kody, enjoyed making music together from a young age, despite their sibling rivalry and difficult home life. Ruban found it as a way to cope with his worsening insomnia, while the younger Kody enjoyed daredevil stunts and being a loud and anarchic frontman. The brothers formed the band in high school in 2001, alongside two friends, Michael Logie and Paul Roper. They began by playing punk house parties and low profile shows before being discovered by the internationally acclaimed New Zealand independent record label Flying Nun Records. The Mint Chicks, a neo-punk and "shit-gaze" band, were famed for their noisy, rowdy shows (with Kody Nielson often hanging himself upside down from the stage).They released two EPs and three albums under the Flying Nun Records banner: Octagon, Octagon, Octagon EP (2003), Anti-Tiger EP (2004), Fuck the Golden Youth (2005), Crazy? Yes! Dumb? No! (2006) and Screens (2009), as well as one EP on a minor label, Bad Buzz (2010). All were produced and recorded by the band's core members Ruban and Kody Nielson, with the exception of Crazy? Yes! Dumb? No! which was produced by the Nielson brothers and their father Chris Nielson at two different home studios.

All four original band members met at Orewa College in Orewa, New Zealand, although the band starting moving between Portland, Oregon and Auckland, as the Nielson brothers have dual citizenship in New Zealand and the U.S.

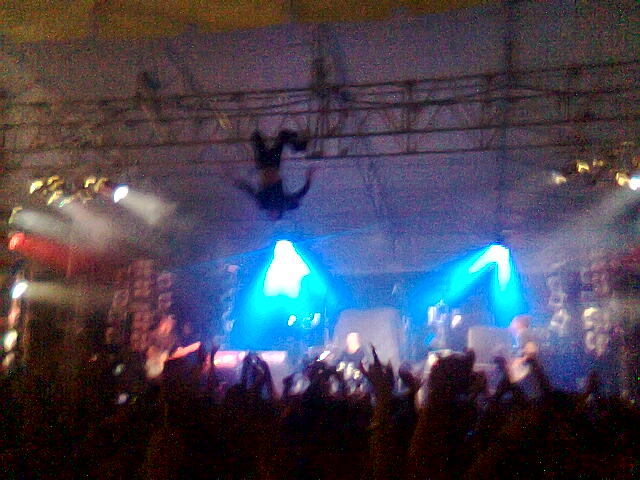
The Mint Chicks, the Nielson brothers' first band, quickly reached stardom. The band was also known for younger brother Kody's daredevil nature when performing, which included destroying their corporate sponsor's sign on stage hanging upside down from the stage (pictured).

In 2006, the band played support for the Yeah Yeah Yeahs. The volume of the show was reportedly so loud that part of the St James theatre complex fell down, injuring two concert goers. They have also played support slots for The White Stripes, Death From Above 1979, TV on the Radio, The Blood Brothers, The Black Lips, and The Bronx. They were also part of the New Zealand line-up for Big Day Out 2004, 2005, 2007 and 2009. In 2005, it was notable that Kody Nielson wielded a chainsaw on stage and destroyed a corporate sponsor's overly prominent sign with it.

At the 2007 New Zealand Music Awards the band won five Tui awards including best rock group, best album, best rock album as well as winning best album cover and best music video for the single "Crazy? Yes! Dumb? No!".

On 24 October 2007, it was announced on the band's website that their bassist Michael Logie would leave the band when they relocated to Portland. The group continued as a trio, with Logie relocating to London, England. The band played a free show in Portland on 29 June 2008, in which they played their then-upcoming third album from beginning to end live. The band later supported Shihad on the July 2008 Beautiful Machine Tour and tested their new songs in front of a home audience. As a result of their bass player having left the band, the Mint Chicks weren't able to play hits from earlier songs, angering some fans. To counter this Shihad's bass player, Karl Kippenberger, filled in for several more popular songs.

On 25 December 2008, The Mint Chicks released the Mintunes EP consisting of "8-bit versions" of both previously released songs and tracks from the upcoming album. The band also released an iTunes-only single during 2008, "Life Will Get Better Some Day", a teaser for the album "Screens", which was released in New Zealand on 16 March 2009 after having been recorded sporadically over the preceding two years.

In October 2009 the Mint Chicks performed a rendition of Ray Columbus and the Invaders' classic hit She's a Mod at the New Zealand Music awards as a four-piece band, later released as a standalone single. Shortly afterwards on 16 October 2009, it was announced Michael Logie would be rejoining the band in a post on the band's Twitter. The band joined with New Zealand music website MusicHy.pe to promote their next record, the Bad Buzz EP, released in February 2010.

Shortly after the release of the EP, the band played their final show on 12 March 2010. The show, originally a fundraiser for MusicHy.pe, ended in chaos after Kody Nielson destroyed the two drumkits and equipment, imploring the crowd to 'start your own fucking band'.

== Unknown Mortal Orchestra ==
Nielson left The Mint Chicks in the beginning of 2010, citing a loss of interest in the group's music. Following an incident during one of the band's live performances and Nielson's subsequent departure, The Mint Chicks broke up. Nielson had already returned to Portland, Oregon, where he began working at a film production company as an illustrator. He quickly found himself wanting to write and record music again and began searching for "psychedelic records with lost tunes" for inspiration. Nielson had become very specific about what type of record he wanted to find for inspiration and, with that specificity, began making that record himself instead. Once he had finished writing and recording the first song, Nielson uploaded it anonymously on May 17, 2010, onto Bandcamp under the name "Ffunny Ffrends". Within a day, the song had received significant coverage from independent music blogs such as Pitchfork.

Nielson maintained the band's anonymity as he was not sure what he wanted the band to be and did not want to "face up to Mint Chicks fans and to people who were looking forward to a new Mint Chicks record." Nielson eventually claimed the track under the band name Unknown Mortal Orchestra.

The band's debut self-titled album was released June 21, 2011 on Fat Possum Records. The album quickly received critical acclaim. Pitchfork gave the album an 8.1, describing that with "an expert use of space rare for such a lo-fi record, UMO manages a unique immersive and psychedelic quality without relying on the usual array of bong-ripping effects."

== Personal life ==
Nielson is married to Jenny Nielson, with whom he was previously in a polyamorous relationship with another woman; this courtship was the main inspiration for Multi-Love. He met Jenny during his time at the Elam School of Fine Arts, and the couple moved in together within a few months of their first date. They have two children. The family continued to live in Portland, Oregon, and Nielson, despite being a New Zealander, has said living in the country has added to a feeling of American identity. Nielson later moved with his family to Palm Springs, California. During the COVID-19 pandemic, Ruban began dividing his time between Palm Springs and Hilo, Hawaii, to be close to his mother and uncles.

Nielson said in response to being described as a musical provocateur; "No, I don't purposefully go out to try and do that......but it is really fun."
