= Avantdale Bowling Club (album) =

2018 debut album by Avantdale Bowling Club

Studio album by Avantdale Bowling Club
- Released: 17 August 2018
- Genre: New Zealand hip hop; jazz rap
- Length: 53:16
- Label: Years Gone By Records

Avantdale Bowling Club chronology
Avantdale Bowling Club (2018)	Trees (2022)

Avantdale Bowling Club is the debut album by Avantdale Bowling Club, a project fronted by New Zealand rapper Tom Scott. The album won the Taite Music Prize in 2019, and was recognised as Album of the Year at the 2019 New Zealand Music Awards. Commercially, it debuted at number one on the New Zealand albums chart.

== Background ==
Tom Scott began work on Avantdale Bowling Club while living in Melbourne, where he had moved after the dissolution of his previous band At Peace. The earliest track he wrote for the album, "Pocket Lint", was completed in 2014. The album builds on Scott's longtime interest in jazz, which stems from his jazz bassist father and his childhood exposure to jazz, funk, and soul music. While working on the album, Scott also listened to the work of Alice Coltrane and Pharoah Sanders.

The title "Avantdale Bowling Club" is a portmanteau, combining the term avant-garde with Scott's hometown of Avondale, Auckland.

== Music ==
Avantdale Bowling Club is a jazz rap album on which Scott collaborates with a large group of musicians. Major contributors to the album include drummer Julien Dyne, pianist Guy Harrison, and producer Ben Lawson. Scott developed the album's tracks by putting together the basic melodies himself, before bringing the album's cast of musicians into the studio to fill out the arrangements. When writing the lyrics for the album, Scott eschewed the traditional hip hop format of sixteen-bar verses, instead writing lengthy verses to complement the album's jazz instrumentation. Addiction and parenthood have been identified as some of the most prevalent recurring themes on the record.

"Years Gone By", the album's opening track and lead single, is an autobiographical song where Scott discusses the progression of his life from year to year. Scott has described the track "F(r)iends" as an "ode" to people he knows who struggle with drug addiction, including his parents and friends; the track also discusses the 2006 suicide of one of Scott's close friends. "Home" samples Chico Hamilton and has been characterised as "the slow-burning... centrepiece of the album", discussing Scott's experiences leaving and returning to New Zealand. "Quincy's March", named in honour of Scott's son, addresses Scott's thoughts and anxieties about parenthood. The final track, "Tea Break", is an instrumental song inspired by Scott's aunt and her battle with early onset dementia.

Scott has characterised Avantdale Bowling Club as a "grown-up version" of his work with the band Home Brew, and described the album's subject matter as follows:

It is about dealing with your own stuff for once. Accepting responsibility. It's a self-help book addressed to myself.

== Critical reception ==
Avantdale Bowling Club received a positive reaction from critics. Karl Puschmann of The New Zealand Herald described it as a "remarkable achievement", and a 2019 profile of Scott stated that "many regard [Avantdale Bowling Club] as his best album yet". Critics particularly praised the album for being more mature and reflective than Scott's previous work, and spoke favorably about its ambitious scope.

The instrumentation on the album has been described as "groove-orientated" jazz with "moody, street vibes". It has also been praised as "lush and beautiful".

== Track listing ==
No.	Title	Length
1.	"Years Gone By"	7:18
2.	"Pocket Lint"	5:06
3.	"F(r)iends"	6:10
4.	"Water Medley"	9:16
5.	"Old Dogs"	5:29
6.	"Home"	7:34
7.	"Quincy's March"	7:33
8.	"Tea Break"	4:50
Total length:		53:16

== Charts ==
=== Weekly charts ===
Weekly chart performance for Avantdale Bowling Club
Chart (2018)	Peak position
New Zealand Albums (RMNZ)	2

=== Year-end charts ===
Year-end chart performance for Avantdale Bowling Club
Chart (2018)	Position
New Zealand Artist Albums (RMNZ)	14
