= New Zealand hip-hop =

Music genre or scene

New Zealand hip hop derives from the wider hip hop cultural movement originating amongst African Americans in the United States. Like the parent movement, New Zealand hip hop consists of four parts: rapping, DJing, graffiti art and breakdancing. The first element of hip hop to reach New Zealand was breakdancing, which gained notoriety after the release of the 1979 movie The Warriors. The first hip hop hit single, "Rapper's Delight" by the Sugarhill Gang, became a hit in New Zealand when it was released there in 1980, a year after it was released in the United States. By the middle of the 1980s, breakdancing and graffiti art were established in urban areas like Wellington and Christchurch. By the early 1990s, hip hop became a part of mainstream New Zealand culture.

Many popular songs for a large part of the genre's history in New Zealand have been performed with mostly English lyrics; however there has been a inverse trend in recent times towards prioritizing of rap in the indigenous Māori language by artists such as Mā.

== Music ==
=== Early years and Māori influence ===
Some of the first hip hop musicians to achieve recognition combined American styles with traditional Māori language songs. The music video for Dalvanius Prime's 1984 popular hit track "Poi E" incorporated hip hop dance elements, making it the first time New Zealanders viewed hip hop culture in association with a local recording. Upper Hutt Posse likewise combined hip hop and Māori culture in their 1988 single "E Tu", which is recognised as New Zealand's first pure hip hop single. A bootleg recording of their song "Hardcore Hiphop" reached number one on Christchurch student radio in February 1988. Some rappers, such as the members of Upper Hutt Posse, became known for politicised lyrics in support of tino rangatiratanga (Māori sovereignty).

Another popular Māori group which incorporated hip hop music was Moana and the Moahunters, which won a New Zealand Music Industry award for best Māori recording in 1992, speaking out against the perceived racism they saw against Māori people in New Zealand. They cited the rarity of airtime on national radio for Māori music and the exclusion from the mainstream music industry as reflective of the wider societal problem. The awarded song is called "AEIOU (Akona Te Reo)", and translates as "Learn the Language". Its release was directed primarily at Māori youth who did not speak Māori. The majority of the lyrics are in English.

Early hip hop releases in New Zealand included the collection Ak89 - In Love With These Rhymes, compiled by Simon Laan and released by Auckland radio bFm in 1989 (on cassette only), and a variety of releases by Southside Records. Amongst these were releases by Urban Disturbance featuring a young rapper, Zane Lowe, now a UK radio personality, and MC OJ & Rhythm Slave.

By the late 1980s, the South Auckland and West Auckland hip hop scenes were thriving, with dozens of young acts, many promoted as part of the Voodoo Rhyme syndicate which featured acts such as the Semi MCs, MC Slam & DJ Jam, Total Effect, Sisters Underground, Enemy Productions (which featured a very young Dei Hamo), Boy C & the BB3 (which later became Three the Hard Way), the Chain Gang and others. Most of the acts that joined the Voodoo Rhyme Syndicate were discovered through talent contests by Voodoo Rhyme Syndicate founder, DJ Andy Vann. The Voodoo Rhyme Syndicate hosted Voodoo dance parties to raise funds to record the acts, and formed Voodoo vinyl in 1989. Voodoo Vinyl's first release in 1989 was Enemy Productions Stop Tagging produced by founder Andy Vann. Other notable related releases include Semi MCs' "Set Your Body Free & Trust Me" and MC Slam & DJ Jam's "Prove Me Wrong", both of which achieved Top 40 success in New Zealand. A DJ competition was held in Auckland in 1989, with DJ Ned Roy winning.

The first major New Zealand commercial hip hop hit was "Hip Hop Holiday" by 3 The Hard Way, featuring the vocal stylings of Bobbylon (from the seminal 1990s Reggae/Punk band Hallelujah Picassos). Released by Deepgrooves Entertainment and distributed by Festival Records, it replayed "Dreadlock Holiday" by 10CC and became a number one hit in 1994 - the first local hip hop single to reach that spot.

Upper Hutt Posse's DJ, DLT, also influenced the local scene in Auckland, including Joint Force, Che Fu and Dam Native. DLT began the influential radio show True Skool Hip Hop Show, which joined Wellington's Wednesday Night Jam in promoting hip hop. Simon Grigg & Nick D'Angelo championed hip hop on a dedicated hip hop radio show on bFm).

=== Polynesian influence ===
In Wellington, K.O.S.-163, more commonly known as Kosmo, influenced the hip hop scene during the 1980s. Returning from a visit to Los Angeles, Kosmo introduced a new type of dance called popping to New Zealand. Aware of their accents and other 'foreign' markers, Samoan youth in California used dancing and hip hop to assert themselves. Nearly three decades of Samoan involvement in street dance and rap music influenced the scene in other cities, including Wellington. With two other New Zealanders, Kosmo started the hip hop group called "The Mau"; their name paying homage to Samoan independence.

Wellington's underground scene was vibrant in the late '80s, from whence arose the local supergroup Rough Opinion and a wave of performers like The Wanderers, Temple Jones and Hamofide.

In the 1990s Maori and Polynesian hip hop musicians grew steadily more popular, leading to a fusion of Pacific and traditional hip hop sounds as Urban Pasifika. Pauly Fuemana as OMC with Alan Jansson took the urban Pacific sound into the world's charts with the multi-million selling "How Bizarre", in 1995. It remains the best-selling song ever recorded in New Zealand. Rapper Scribe became the first to top both the single and album charts at the same time in 2004. Savage became the first New Zealand hip hop artist in history to have a single achieve platinum certification status in the United States with his single "Swing". The track featured in the 2007 film Knocked Up. Many top hip hop artists are signed with Dawn Raid Entertainment, a Polynesian-run record label based in Manukau. Dawn Raid briefly went out of business early in 2007 after financial problems resulting from the expensive production of several albums.

Che Fu remains one of New Zealand's most successful hip hop artists. He began his career at high school with a group of friends and they eventually formed the Low Down Dirty Blues Band, which went on to be the legendary Supergroove. Their first album, Traction sold triple platinum and went on to win countless awards. Che Fu's fame continued through the 90s with his involvement with DLT in the number one hit song Chains in 1996, and in 2002 he won album of the year in the New Zealand music awards.

=== Hip hop in the 2000s and 2010s ===
The years 2004–2005 are often seen as a high-water mark for the popularity of hip hop music in New Zealand, and a book on the subject, Hip Hop Music In Aotearoa, won a national book award.

Smashproof's single "Brother", featuring singer Gin Wigmore, reached the top of the New Zealand charts in 2009.

=== Hip hop in the 2020s ===
UK-born, Auckland-based Nigerian hip hop artist and producer Mazbou Q was one of the organisers of the Black Lives Matter George Floyd protests in Auckland on 1 June and 14 June 2020. He spoke about the ongoing persecution of the Black African communities, including: "The same white supremacy which has led to disproportionate killings of Black people in the US exists here in New Zealand." He called on Prime Minister Jacinda Ardern to condemn violence against Black Americans. He also spoke and wrote about the appropriation of Black American culture, including hip hop ghetto culture born from the oppressed minorities the South Bronx in the 1970s, and the lack of exposure for New Zealand Black African hip hop artists compared to Māori and Pasifika artists. As a result, schools invited him, and other organisers, to speak to their students and staff.

== Notable national awards ==
=== APRA Silver Scroll Award ===
The annual APRA Silver Scroll Awards in New Zealand is a prestigious honour for New Zealand songwriters. In 1999, King Kapisi became the first hip hop artist to receive the Silver Scroll Award for his single Reverse Resistance. In 2002, Che Fu (and Godfrey de Grut) won for Misty Frequencies, Nesian Mystik in 2004 with their single For the People, and in 2004, Scribe and P-Money won with their huge hit Not Many.

=== Taite Music Prize ===
The annual Taite Music Prize honours the best New Zealand album of year, regardless of genre, judged on originality, creativity and musicianship, rather than sales or commercial factors.. In 2026 rapper Tom Scott became a finalist for a record seventh time. Two of the first 16 annual prizes have been won by hip hop artists: Scott in 2019, for Avantdale Bowling Club, and Ladi6 in 2011 for The Liberation Of....

== Notable artists ==
- 3 The Hard Way
- At Peace
- Che Fu
- David Dallas aka Con Psy
- Deceptikonz
- DLT
- Double J and Twice the T
- Fast Crew
- Frontline
- Home Brew Crew
- King Kapisi
- Misfits of Science (group)
- Mā
- Mareko
- Mazbou Q
- MC OJ & Rhythm Slave
- Nesian Mystik
- OMC
- P-Money
- PNC
- Rapture Ruckus
- Rizvan
- Savage
- Tom Scott
- Scribe
- SWIDT
- Sisters Underground
- Tommy Ill
- Young Sid

== Breakdancing ==
Breakdancing first came to New Zealand via TV, Movies and American Samoa through Western Samoa in the early 1980s. One can see the influence of Samoan culture in New Zealand's appropriation of breakdancing specifically through language. The term "bopping," for example, comes from a Samoan pronunciation of popping, one of the elements in breakdance, where a dancer will move in a stilted fashion, isolating their limbs robotically. After its initial period of popularity, breakdancing fell out of fashion for most of the 1990s. Late in that decade it underwent a revival, and breakdancing stages can be found at events such as the Aotearoa Hip-Hop Summit.

The nearly three decades of Samoan involvement in street dance and rap music in California has significantly impacted Samoan cultural production in other places where Samoans have settled, including New Zealand. The dancing in New Zealand is heavily influenced by American dances.

One reason break dancing became popular was that many youth saw it as a way of being recognized or a channel of identity. Maori youth that had little chance of being recognized for accomplishments in school or sport found break dancing as a new way to achieve recognition. Early on, New Zealand even sponsored a national break dancing competition for young Maori and Pacific Islanders. This helped many young breakers to realize their potential by giving them a nation audience.

Many of the Maori and Pacific Island youth found alternative possibilities to organize their daily lives. Images of street dance arriving via imported American media - such as the movies Flashdance or Beat Street granted a legitimacy to their efforts. This gave a boost of confidence for both Maori and the children of recent immigrants, and the American street dance forms such as popping, locking and breaking created a friendly environment for Maori and Pacific Islander youth in order to fashion their own styles and codes.

New Zealand-born choreographer and dancer Parris Goebel, who is of Samoan descent, has worked with artists including Justin Bieber, Rihanna, Janet Jackson, Jennifer Lopez, Nicki Minaj, BIGBANG, CL, iKON, Taeyang. Her work has included choreographing routines and starring in music videos and movies. One of her notable successes was her work choreographing the video "Sorry" for Justin Bieber, which as of March 2016 is one of the 5 top viewed videos on YouTube with more than 1.7 billion views. Goebel went on to choreograph and direct all thirteen of Justin Bieber's Purpose: The Movement videos. These videos have totaled over 3 billion views combined.

== Battle rap ==
Battle rapping has had a strong underground presence in New Zealand. 1Outz is an organized rap battle league that began in Auckland, and Red Zone Battle's is another which began in Christchurch.

== Graffiti art ==
As elsewhere, New Zealand graffiti art takes two forms: bombing (usually large scale and multi-coloured, using paint and generally requiring some artistic skill) and tagging (stylised writing of the tagger's 'tag' name). In 1999 the Dowse Art Museum mounted an exhibition of street art called Style Crimes, followed by Common Ground in 2009. Exhibitions signalled street art's growing acceptance as a legitimate art form. The artistic quality of the best work was recognised and practitioners were able to make a career out of street art. Some were commissioned by local councils and businesses to create pieces. Organisations for troubled youth ran legal graffiti sessions. Another early event was Disrupt the System, organised in Aotea Square, Auckland, in 2000. More recent events include Nelson's Oi You! (first held in 2010), Taupō's Graffiato (2011), Auckland's All Fresco (2013), Christchurch's From the Ground Up (2013) and Kawerau's Street Legal (2014).

=== Artists ===
Askew One (Elliot O'Donnell) is the most prominent street artist in New Zealand and is well known in street art circles overseas. He started out tagging as a teenager in the 1990s and graduated to pieces, and eventually to works on canvas. Some street artists work together in collectives. Smooth Inc were at work in Auckland in the 1980s. They were followed by TMD (The Most Dedicated) in the mid-1990s. Cut Collective was founded in 2006. Its members have been commissioned to make public murals, and have exhibited at the Dowse Art Museum, Auckland Art Gallery and Dunedin Public Art Gallery. Many female artists have gained recognition for their work, including Diva, Misery (Tanja Thompson), Flox (Hayley King), Erin Forsyth, Ikon and Mica Still.

== See also ==
- Samoan hip-hop
- Hawaiian hip-hop (nā mele paleoleo)
