= List of Billboard Mainstream Top 40 number-one songs of the 1990s =

The Mainstream Top 40 airplay-based chart debuted in Billboard magazine in its issue dated October 3, 1992, with rankings determined by monitored airplay from data compiled by Broadcast Data Systems, a then-new technology which can detect when and how often songs are being played on radio stations. The 40-position chart was published in the print edition of Billboard through May 1995, after which it only appeared in Billboard's sister publication, Airplay Monitor, and the Billboard.com website, returning to the print edition in 2003. During the 1990s, the chart was called Top 40/Mainstream alongside a second Top 40 Airplay chart, Top 40/Rhythm-Crossover. The first number-one song on both of these charts was "End of the Road" by Boyz II Men.

Mainstream Top 40 is compiled from airplay on radio stations which play a wide variety of music, not just "pure pop", which Billboard defines as "melodic, often synth-driven, uptempo fare". During the 1990s, mainstream top 40 went from R&B dominating the airwaves (and thus the charts) in the early 1990s to rock and alternative music becoming the choice of program directors in the latter part of the decade. The mid-1990s also witnessed a drastic difference between what reached the top of the Mainstream Top 40 chart and the Hot 100, when songs started being promoted to radio and receiving significant airplay without the release of a commercially available single, a requirement for a song to reach the Hot 100. Thus, number-one songs on the Mainstream Top 40 such as "I'll Be There for You", "Fly", "Don't Speak", "Lovefool", "Torn", "Uninvited", and "Iris" failed to reach or have a similar impact on the Hot 100. Hot 100 rules changed allowing airplay-only songs to chart in late 1998.

== Number-one pop songs of the 1990s ==
Key
†	Indicates best-performing pop song of the year

Issue date	Song	Artist(s)	Weeks at number one	Ref.
1992
October 3	"End of the Road"	Boyz II Men	1	
October 10	"Sometimes Love Just Ain't Enough"	Patty Smyth and Don Henley	3	
October 31	"How Do You Talk to an Angel"	The Heights	6	
December 12	"I Will Always Love You"	Whitney Houston	9	
1993
February 13	"Ordinary World"	Duran Duran	2	
February 27	"A Whole New World"	Peabo Bryson and Regina Belle	1	
March 6	"Ordinary World"	Duran Duran	5	
April 10	"Two Princes" †	Spin Doctors	7	
May 29	"That's the Way Love Goes"	Janet Jackson	9	
July 31	"Can't Help Falling in Love"	UB40	5	
September 4	"Dreamlover"	Mariah Carey	8	
October 30	"All That She Wants"	Ace of Base	9	
1994
January 1	"Hero"	Mariah Carey	5	
February 5	"All for Love"	Bryan Adams / Rod Stewart / Sting	1	
February 12	"The Sign" †	Ace of Base	14	
May 21	"Baby, I Love Your Way"	Big Mountain	1	
May 28	"I Swear"	All-4-One	6	
July 9	"Don't Turn Around"	Ace of Base	6	
August 20	"Stay (I Missed You)"	Lisa Loeb & Nine Stories	3	
September 10	"I'll Make Love to You"	Boyz II Men	4	
October 8	"All I Wanna Do"	Sheryl Crow	7	
November 26	"Another Night"	Real McCoy	4	
December 24	"On Bended Knee"	Boyz II Men	1	
December 31	"Another Night"	Real McCoy	1	
1995
January 7	"On Bended Knee"	Boyz II Men	1	
January 14	"Another Night"	Real McCoy	1	
January 21	"On Bended Knee"	Boyz II Men	5	
February 25	"Take a Bow"	Madonna	5	
April 1	"I Know" †	Dionne Farris	10	
June 10	"Total Eclipse of the Heart"	Nicki French	1	
June 17	"I'll Be There for You"	The Rembrandts	8	
August 12	"Kiss from a Rose"	Seal	9	
October 14	"Only Wanna Be with You"	Hootie & the Blowfish	2	
October 28	"Fantasy"	Mariah Carey	6	
December 9	"One Sweet Day"	Mariah Carey and Boyz II Men	11	
1996
February 24	"Missing"	Everything but the Girl	5	
March 30	"Ironic" †	Alanis Morissette	7	
May 18	"Because You Loved Me"	Celine Dion	5	
June 22	"Killing Me Softly"	Fugees	3	
July 13	"You Learn"	Alanis Morissette	7	
August 31	"I Love You Always Forever"	Donna Lewis	11	
November 16	"It's All Coming Back to Me Now"	Celine Dion	1	
November 23	"Head Over Feet"	Alanis Morissette	3	
December 14	"Don't Speak" †(1997)	No Doubt	10	
1997
February 22	"Lovefool"	The Cardigans	7	
April 12	"You Were Meant for Me"	Jewel	4	
May 10	"I Want You"	Savage Garden	2	
May 24	"MMMBop"	Hanson	8	
July 19	"Bitch"	Meredith Brooks	4	
August 16	"How Bizarre"	OMC	1	
August 23	"Semi-Charmed Life"	Third Eye Blind	6	
October 4	"Foolish Games"	Jewel	3	
October 25	"Fly"	Sugar Ray	5	
November 29	"Tubthumping"	Chumbawamba	9	
1998
January 31	"Truly Madly Deeply"	Savage Garden	1	
February 7	"My Heart Will Go On"	Celine Dion	10	
April 18	"Truly Madly Deeply"	Savage Garden	1	
April 25	"Torn"	Natalie Imbruglia	11	
July 11	"Uninvited"	Alanis Morissette	2	
July 25	"Iris" †	Goo Goo Dolls	4	
August 22	"I Don't Want to Miss a Thing"	Aerosmith	8	
October 17	"One Week"	Barenaked Ladies	7	
December 5	"Lullaby"	Shawn Mullins	8	
1999
January 30	"Save Tonight"	Eagle-Eye Cherry	1	
February 6	"Slide" †	Goo Goo Dolls	2	
February 20	"...Baby One More Time"	Britney Spears	5	
March 27	"Every Morning"	Sugar Ray	7	
May 15	"Kiss Me"	Sixpence None The Richer	1	
May 22	"No Scrubs"	TLC	1	
May 29	"Livin' la Vida Loca"	Ricky Martin	7	
July 17	"I Want It That Way"	Backstreet Boys	2	
July 31	"All Star"	Smash Mouth	6	
September 11	"Genie in a Bottle"	Christina Aguilera	4	
October 9	"Mambo No. 5 (A Little Bit Of...)"	Lou Bega	5	
November 13	"Smooth"	Santana featuring Rob Thomas	8	

== See also ==
- 1990s in music
- List of Billboard Hot 100 number-one singles of the 1990s
- List of artists who reached number one on the Billboard Mainstream Top 40 chart
