= Phil Fuemana =

- Born: Philip Fuemana; 6 January 1964; Auckland, New Zealand
- Died: 28 February 2005 (aged 41) Auckland, New Zealand
- Occupations: Musician; producer; songwriter; singer; mentor
- Instrument: Vocals
- Years active: 1990–2005
- Label: Urban Pasifika
- Formerly of: OMC; Pauly Fuemana; Matty J Ruys; Fuemana; Houseparty

Philip Fuemana (6 January 1964 – 28 February 2005) was a New Zealand musician. Affectionately known as "the Godfather of South Auckland", he was highly regarded for his work in South Auckland in establishing the Urban Pasifika sound, founding Urban Pacifika Records in 1996 with Moizna, AKA Brown, Lost Tribe, and Dei Hamo.

Fuemana died of a heart attack at his Auckland home in 2005.

== Fuemana ==
Fuemana was a soul group consisting of Phil and siblings Tony, Christina and Pauly Fuemana as well as Matty J Ruys. The group initially recorded a single for Southside Records under the name Houseparty, then switched to Deepgrooves to record under the name Fuemana.

Styled as "the purveyors of Polynesian swing", the band released its first album New Urban Polynesian in 1994. The album was produced and arranged by Phil Fuemana, and has been described as “a uniquely Pasifika take on soul” that reflected his wider aim of putting “young Polynesian artists on the frontline”. Fuemana’s work during this period is also cited by AudioCulture as part of Phil Fuemana’s role as a “trailblazer for Polynesian music” in South Auckland.

The album New Urban Polynesian was reissued in 2024, on vinyl for the first time, by Australian label Gazebo Records. Fuemana also took part in the 1994 Proud project—an album and national tour showcasing emerging South Auckland Pacific artists—which helped bring Urban Pasifika music to wider attention.

== OMC ==
The Otara Millionaire's Club was originally formed in 1993 by Phil Fuemana. Fuemana and his younger brother Pauly Fuemana recorded two tracks as the new band for producer Alan Jansson's Urban Pacifica collection, Proud.

Pauly suggested that they shorten the band's name to just the initials, and thereafter, he and Jansson were OMC. Pauly became the public face of the band and its primary performer, serving as the frontman and playing several instruments during performances and tours. However, the music was created by both of them, with Jansson co-writing all of the tracks and handling most of the arrangement and production duties in the studio. The OMC reached worldwide fame in 1995 with the single "How Bizarre", from the debut studio album of the same name.

== Discography ==
=== Albums with Fuemana ===
Year	Title	Details	Peak chart positions
Year	Title	Details	NZ
1994	New Urban Polynesian	Label: Deepgrooves Entertainment; Catalogue: DG018	—
"—" denotes a recording that did not chart or was not released in that territory.

=== Singles with Fuemana ===
Year	Title	Peak chart positions	Album
Year	Title	NZ	Album
1991	"Dangerous Love" (as Houseparty)		
1994	"Rocket Love"	—	New Urban Polynesian
1994	"Closer"	35	New Urban Polynesian
1994	"Seasons"	—	New Urban Polynesian
"—" denotes a recording that did not chart or was not released in that territory.

=== In compilations ===
Year	Title	Album
2006	"I Lov U"	Urban Gospel Volume one
