= Urban Pasifika =

Music subgenre

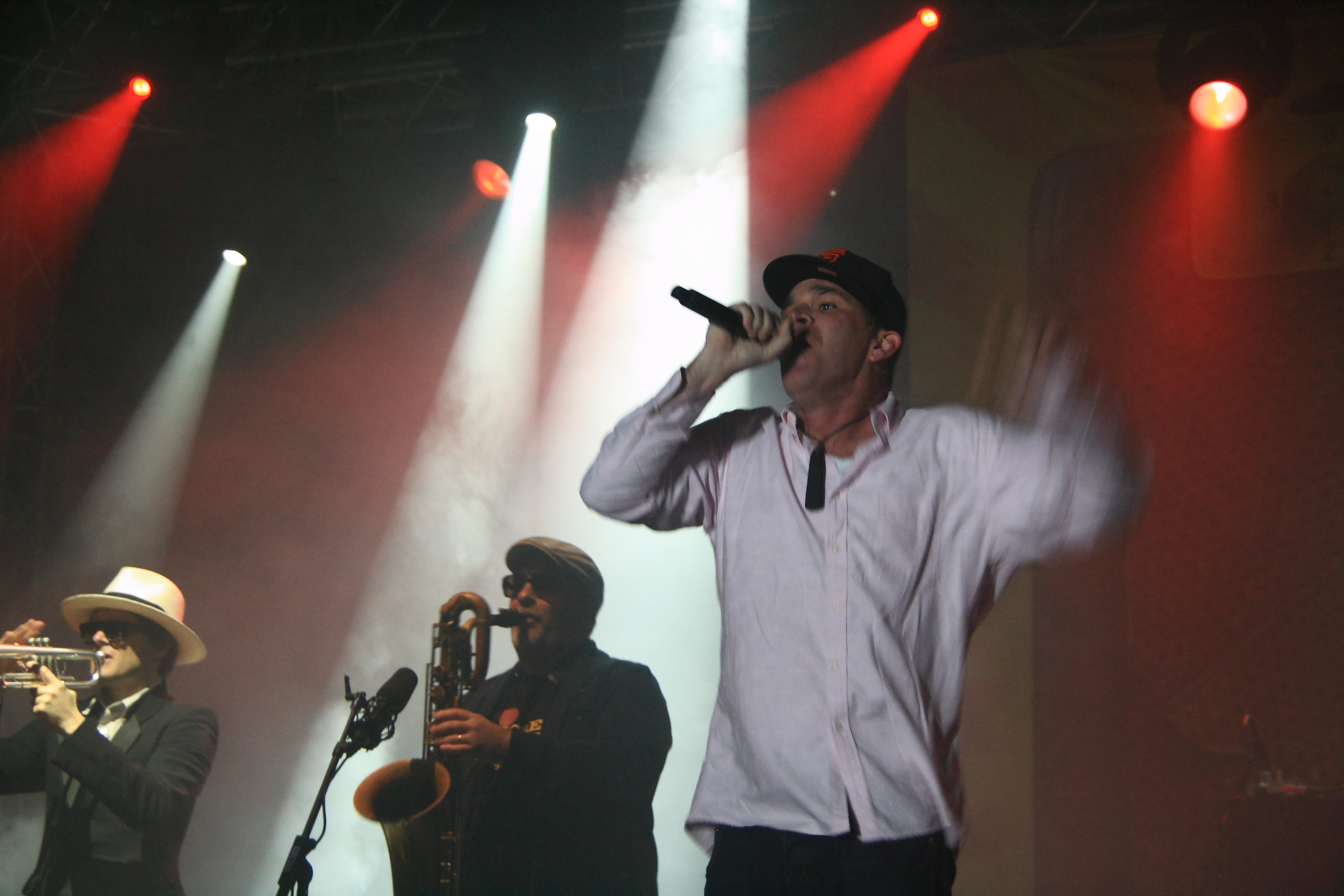
- Stylistic origins: New Zealand reggae; hip hop; funk; pop rock; jazz; soul; reggae; folk
- Cultural origins: Late 1980s, South Auckland
- Typical instruments: Vocals; Spanish guitar; turntables; drum machine; drums; keyboard; sampler; bass guitar; guitar; synthesiser

Other topics
- Underground hip hop; Turntablism; Alternative music

Urban Pasifika (also known as Urban Pacific and Urban Pacifika) is a New Zealand subgenre of hip hop, that developed primarily among Pasifika New Zealanders in South Auckland. Drawn from alternative hip hop and R&B influences, it was quickly blended with Pacific Island or Māori instrumentation and traditional songwriting (such as ukulele samples) and singing and rapping in a variety of Polynesian languages, such as Māori, Samoan, Niuean and Tongan. The genre's genesis in the 1980s blossomed into a unique, globally enrapturing cultural scene in its homeland of Auckland, especially in the next decade. Urban Pasifika is one of the most popular music genres to arise from New Zealand, and helped cement Auckland's reputation on the world stage as a major cultural centre, and the most ethnically Polynesian city in the world.

It originated within the Pasifika community in Auckland, specifically its heavily Polynesian southern suburbs; the genre quickly gained traction, with a major scene in Wellington's suburbs of Lyall Bay, Newtown, Aro Valley and Te Aro within its Cuba Precinct (such as Fat Freddy's Drop, King Kapisi and Upper Hutt Posse) and, to a lesser extent, Christchurch (with the globally successful rapper Scribe). Two of the best known examples of the genre are In The Neighbourhood by the duo Sisters Underground, released in 1994, and OMC's How Bizarre and On The Run, the former of which became a smash hit worldwide, topping the charts in multiple countries. The 1990s were the heyday for Urban Pasifika artists, and icons of the genre went on to become legends of New Zealand music and within the greater New Zealand diaspora.

== History ==
Māori music, and Māori cultural in general, went through a renaissance in the early 1980s, both in terms of revival of traditional styles and political self identity. Many Māori came to identify with the politics and rhythms of the reggae music of the Caribbean, leading to the development of a distinctly New Zealand reggae style, led by groups such as Herbs and Dread Beat & Blood. In 1983, Māori singer Dalvanius Prime recorded a song, "Poi E", with kapa haka group Pātea Māori Club combining breakdancing rhythms with traditional Māori music, which became a surprise hit - the biggest hit in Te Reo Māori for 25 years.

In the late 1980s, Upper Hutt Posse became the first New Zealand band to record a bilingual rap song, "E Tu", which combined western pop-rock styles with more obvious Māori influences. The influence of Upper Hutt Posse's music, and that of other bands experimenting with cross-cultural popular music, led to increasing interest in hybrid Pacific/western pop and rock, particularly among urban Māori.

The new genre's name, and a more solidly defined style, date from the 1994 release of the compilation album Proud, assembled by Alan Jansson, which merged hip-hop beats with acoustic instruments. A track from the album, "In the Neighbourhood" by Sisters Underground became the first top ten single in the style, gaining it a wide audience in both the New Zealand Pacific and Pākehā communities. Other breakout acts to appear on the album included OMC and Semi MC's.

=== Phillip Fuemana and Urban Pacifika Records ===
The sound developed further in 1999 with the release of the compilation album Urban Pacifika Records - Pioneers of a Pacifikan Frontier featuring Moizna, AKA Brown, Lost Tribe, and Dei Hamo on Auckland based record label started by Phillip Fuemana called Urban Pasifika Records.

Phillip Fuemana's influence on NZ music was significant, he started a music movement that continues today, he on worked and produced many albums and singles and directed a number of music videos. He was also influential in the development of the independent South Auckland label Dawn Raid Entertainment.

Phillip was one of the founders of the band OMC. Phil started OMC as an outlet for his instrumentals but passed it on to his younger brother Pauly Fuemana who then went on to work with Alan Jansson as a partner, creating the song "How Bizarre", which became an international hit. OMC went on to sell over 4 million records.

== Urban Pasifika artists ==
Main artists active in the Urban Pasifika subgenre include:

- Che Fu
- King Kapisi
- Dei Hamo
- Adeaze
- Savage
- Deceptikonz
- Nesian Mystik

Other New Zealand bands, such as Fat Freddy's Drop, TrinityRoots, Katchafire, Shapeshifter, and Salmonella Dub include elements of Urban Pasifika in their style.
