= 2013 Taite Music Prize =

Music award ceremony

- Awarded for: The best NZ album released in 2012
- Sponsored by: PPNZ Music Licensing; Red Bull
- Date: 17 April 2013
- Venue: Galatos, Auckland
- Country: New Zealand
- Presented by: Charlotte Ryan
- Acts: Street Chant; Julia Deans
- Reward: $10,000
- Winner(s): Elastic Wasteland, by SJD

Highlights
- IMNZ Classic Record: The Gordons, by The Gordons
- Website: indies.co.nz

The fourth annual Taite Music Prize, and the first ever IMNZ Classic Record award, were presented on 15 April 2013 at a ceremony in Auckland, organised by Independent Music New Zealand (IMNZ). The winner of the main award was SJD for his album Elastic Wasteland, and the inaugural IMNZ Classic Record was The Gordons by The Gordons.

== Main Prize ==
The ceremony and its main award share the "Taite Music Prize" name. This award recognises New Zealand's best album of the previous year (2012). The winner, Elastic Wasteland by SJD, was selected by a panel of ten judges. Criteria for the award include artistic merit, creativity, innovation and excellence. The winner received $10,000 from PPNZ Music Licensing, recording time at Red Bull Studios, and a "year's supply" of Red Bull.

2013 saw the introduction of the Taite Music Prize's 7kg, metal, T-shaped trophy. A new trophy of the same design has been made every year since.

=== Winner ===
SJD, real name Sean Donnelly, called his win "a strange feeling, like jumping off a cliff and having winged angels lift you up!"

Describing Elastic Wasteland after he had been named as a finalist, Donnelly had said, "It's 50% album and it's 50% statement. That might sound pretentious, but it's genuinely what it is - a bit of an artistic statement that I wanted to make, something pretty uncompromising...It's a bit dark in places". He also said that "there's a degree of prestige and credibility to this particular prize."

Judging panel member Gary Steel said, "I gave Elastic Wasteland a 5 out of 5 star review in Metro magazine last year, noting that despite his position as 'probably the most critically acclaimed songwriter of his generation...the charts are bereft of his music, the awards not yet accumulating on his mantelpiece, and many still seem indifferent to his luminescent art-pop'. I'm thrilled to have been able to play a small part in honouring SJD with the only award that recognises originality and innovation in music over the generic qualities associated with popularity-based prizes."

=== Nominations and finalists ===
After an open call for nominations ran from 6 December 2012 to 21 January 2013, a total of 75 albums were entered. This list went to a vote of all IMNZ members, plus 30 others including people drawn from record labels and media, which found seven finalists. The shortlist was announced on 26 February.

Tom Scott was the first artist to receive two places in a single Taite Music Prize final, with Home Brew and @Peace. The latter of those began a three-year run of final appearances. Lawrence Arabia became the first Taite winner to make a second finals appearance.

2013 Taite Music Prize finalists
| Artist | Album | Label | Result |
|---|---|---|---|
| Aaradhna | Treble & Reverb | Frequency Media Group | Nominated |
| @Peace | @Peace | Frequency Media Group | Nominated |
| Collapsing Cities | Strangers Again | Pastel Pistol | Nominated |
| Home Brew | Home Brew | Young Gifted & Broke / Frequency Media Group | Nominated |
| Lawrence Arabia | The Sparrow | Honorary Bedouin | Nominated |
| Opossum | Electric Hawaii | CRS Records | Nominated |
| SJD | Elastic Wasteland | Round Trip Mars | Won |

=== Judging panel ===
The judges of the 2013 Taite Music Prize were:

- Nick Atkinson (Radio NZ)
- Murray Cammick (founder of Rip It Up, Wildside Records, and Southside Records)
- Leonie Hayden (Editor, Rip It Up)
- Jan Hellriegel (IMNZ member / Native Tongue Music Publishing)
- Lydia Jenkin (New Zealand Herald)
- Ren Kirk (Editor, theaudience.co.nz)
- Sandra Hopping (IMNZ member/ Ode Records)
- Grant Smithies (Sunday Star Times)
- Gary Steel (music journalist and writer)
- Damian Vaughan (NZ Licensing Manager, APRA)

John Taite (BBC America), son of award namesake Dylan Taite, was included as what IMNZ called the panel's "permanent 11th man...to keep the connection with Dylan Taite strong". He was unable to join the other panelists for the in-person selection of the winning album.

Panellist Grant Smithies described the judging process: "there was a good deal of cursing and cajoling, and aspersions were cast upon one another's parentage, hearing and taste levels. We drank an ocean of wine and beer, ate a mountain of little sandwiches with the crusts cut off, and debated until our throats gave out. There were voices raised and threats of physical violence."

== IMNZ Classic Record ==
The Gordons, by The Gordons, first released in 1981, was announced as the inaugural winner of the IMNZ Classic Album award on 11 April, a few days before the award ceremony. There was no public nomination process or vote. The award was presented by Shayne Carter to band member John Halvorsen.

Quoted in the award announcement, Halvorsen said, "I’m shocked. I feel grateful to be acknowledged after all these years by the industry – it’s our first ever award. I’m humbled and grateful."

Grant Smithies, one of the judges, had written in 2007 that the record "remains unsurpassed for its nasty beauty, its ice-cold pessimism and white-hot intensity."

== Award ceremony ==
The invitation-only Taite Music Prize ceremony was held on 17 April 2013 at Galatos in Auckland, and livestreamed on the New Zealand Herald website. Around 300 people attended. Charlotte Ryan was the host, and performers included Street Chant and Julia Deans.
