= How Bizarre (disambiguation) =

"How Bizarre" is a 1995 song by OMC.

How Bizarre may also refer to:

- How Bizarre (album), by OMC, 1996
- How Bizarre: The Story of an Otara Millionaire, a 2014 documentary by Stuart Page about OMC lead singer Paul Fuemana
- "How Bizarre", a 2014 TV episode of Degrassi season 13
