= Trees (album) =

2022 album by Avantdale Bowling Club

Studio album by Avantdale Bowling Club
- Released: 30 September 2022
- Genre: Hip-hop; jazz
- Length: 42:04
- Label: Years Gone By
- Producer: Christoph El Truento; Haz Beats

Avantdale Bowling Club chronology
Avantdale Bowling Club (2018)	Trees (2022)

Trees (stylised as TREES) is the second studio album by Avantdale Bowling Club, the solo project of New Zealand rapper Tom Scott. Released in September 2022, the album debuted at number one on the Official New Zealand Music Chart.

== Production ==
Scott worked together with former At Peace bandmate Christoph El Truento to create the album. The pair worked to create a more modern sound on the album compared to the debut Avantdale Bowling Club album from 2018, by incorporating auto-tune, newer drum machines and accordion.

== Release and promotion ==
As a part of the 2022 New Zealand International Film Festival, Scott released Trees, an 18-minute short film directed by Scott that depicts a dystopian world where trees have been banned. The film starred Bruce Hopkins, and was scored by Avantdale Bowling Club. Scott toured New Zealand in November and December 2022, performing six dates including performances at the Auckland Town Hall and the St. James Theatre, Wellington.

== Critical reception ==
Everything Is Noise chose Trees as one of their top 75 albums of 2022, while Hip-Hop Golden Age chose Trees as the 14th best hip-hop album of 2022, praising the album as "an effortless fusion of neo-jazz and Hip Hop", noting that "Trees is more subtle and humble than Avantdale Bowling Club's eponymous masterpiece debut".

== Track listing ==
Trees track listing
No.	Title	Writer(s)	Length
1.	"Trees"	Chris James; Tom Scott	3:43
2.	"Rent 2 High"	Cory Champion; Harry Huavi; Tom Scott	5:49
3.	"Twenty Eight"	James; Scott	2:48
4.	"Flying Pigs"	Chris James; Eden Jouavel; Teddy Wright; Scott	6:17
5.	"Friday Night @ the Liquor Store"	James; Scott	3:20
6.	"Going Through It."	James; Scott	6:17
7.	"Still Feel Broke"	James; Mara TK; Scott	5:50
8.	"Remember, I Really Am Asleep?"	James; Quincy Wainui; Scott	0:59
9.	"Without You"	James; Scott	5:27
10.	"Outro?"	James; Dallas Tamaira	1:34
Total length:			42:04

== Credits and personnel ==
- Tom Broome – recording (2)
- Cory Champion – drums, vibraphone
- Tom Dennison – additional bass
- Julien Dyne – drums
- Christoph El Truento – mixer, producer
- Guy Harrison – keyboards, trumpet
- Brandon Haru – keyboards
- Daniel Hayles – keyboards
- Haz Beats – producer (2)
- Hershel Hersche – accordion
- Troy Kingi – additional vocals
- Ben Lawson – mixer, recording engineer
- Jong-Yung Lee – saxophone
- Parks – keyboards
- Rizvan – additional vocals
- Tom Scott – concept, vocals
- Manhit Singh – tabla
- Hollie Smith – additional vocals
- Dallas Tamaira – additional vocals
- Mara TK – additional vocals, guitar, sitar
- Jeremy Toy – additional guitar
- Lui Tuiasau – additional vocals
- Ben Turua – bass
- Tonga Vaea – additional vocals

== Charts ==
=== Weekly charts ===
Weekly chart performance for Trees
Chart (2022)	Peak position
New Zealand Albums (RMNZ)	1

=== Year-end charts ===
Year-end chart performance for Trees
Chart (2022)	Position
New Zealand Artist Albums (RMNZ)	11

== Release history ==
Release dates and formats for Trees
Region	Date	Format(s)	Label(s)	Ref.
Various	30 September 2022	Vinyl; digital download; streaming	Years Gone By	
