= Charlotte Ryan =

Charlotte Ryan may refer to:

- Charlotte Ryan (The Unit)
- Charlotte Ryan (broadcaster)
