= Tom Scott (rapper) =

New Zealand rapper (born 1984)

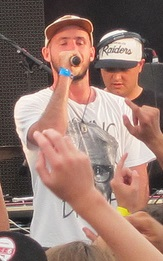
- Scott performing with Home Brew in 2012

Background information
- Born: 1984 (age 41–42)
- Origin: Avondale, Auckland, New Zealand
- Genres: Hip hop, jazz rap
- Years active: 2007–present

Tom Scott (born 1984) is a New Zealand rapper. He is known for his role in the groups Home Brew, At Peace, and Avantdale Bowling Club. His groups are generally characterized by jazz-influenced instrumentation and political lyrics.

NPR has described Scott as "one of the biggest role players" in New Zealand hip hop; The Spinoff identifies him as "New Zealand hip-hop's finest storyteller [and] most brazen agitator".

== Early life ==
Tom Scott was born in the United Kingdom in 1984, but lived there only briefly before his family moved to New Zealand in 1987. Scott spent most of his childhood in Avondale, Auckland, a town that would become one of the inspirations for the "Avantdale Bowling Club" name.

Scott began rapping at the age of ten, initially only as a hobby. His father, jazz bassist Peter Scott, also introduced Scott to 1970s jazz, soul, and funk from a young age.

== Career ==
=== Home Brew ===
After leaving university, Scott returned to the Auckland area to focus on music. Scott connected with producer Haz Beats online; the two then recruited Lui "Lui Silk" Gamaka and formed the band Home Brew. The group released several EPs throughout the later 2000s, followed by their self-titled studio album in 2012. Home Brew reached the number-one position on the New Zealand album charts in the week of 7 May 2012, and won Best Urban / Hip Hop Album at the 2012 New Zealand Music Awards. During his time with Home Brew, Scott attracted attention and controversy for his stridently political material, including frequent criticism of then-Prime Minister John Key.

As of 2019, Home Brew continues to tour together.

=== At Peace ===
Tom Scott was a member of the band At Peace (stylised as "@Peace"), along with fellow vocalist Lui Tuiasau and producers Christoph El Truento, Dandruff Dicky, and B Haru. The group released three albums between 2012 and 2014, and disbanded in 2015. Each of the group's albums was nominated for the Taite Music Prize.

During his time with At Peace, Scott attracted controversy after releasing a song titled "Kill the PM". The song, released in 2014, threatened to kill John Key and to have sex with his daughter. In a subsequent interview with Radio New Zealand, Scott stated that he did not regret his statements, before criticizing Key further and ultimately walking out of the interview. Scott later clarified his goals on a Facebook post, stating that his threats were not literal and that his intent was to encourage people to register to vote. Looking back on the controversy in 2018, Scott acknowledged that he had handled the situation poorly, but stated his belief that, as an artist, he had a responsibility to speak out about political issues he found important.

=== Average Rap Band ===
After the backlash to "Kill the PM", Scott and bandmate Lui Tuiasau formed a new group called Average Rap Band, seeking to release music that the public would not associate with the controversy. In contrast to the prominent jazz influences that appear in most of Scott's projects, Average Rap Band instead uses a 1980s-inspired, synthesizer-driven sound.

In 2015 Average Rap Band released their first project, the 6-track EP titled Stream of Nonsenseness. The following year, in 2016, they released their first full mixtape, El Sol. El Sol is an abstract project, using more synthesised, electronic sounds in its production, and combines themes of existentialism and self-reflection with commentary on society and the nature of humanity. Average Rap Band also released various singles over the course of 2015 and 2016.

=== Avantdale Bowling Club ===
After moving to Collingwood, Melbourne, Australia, in 2013, Scott began writing lyrics to occupy his time while in the unfamiliar environment of the city. He subsequently returned to Avondale in 2017, at which point he announced the foundation of Avantdale Bowling Club and began collaborating with a large group of musicians to expand the material into a full album. The group's debut album, Avantdale Bowling Club, was released in 2018; it went on to win the Taite Music Prize in 2019, and to be named Album of the Year at the 2019 New Zealand Music Awards.

Avantdale Bowling Club released its second album, Trees, in 2022.

=== Solo ===
In 2025 Scott released his first album under the name Tom Scott. ANITYA peaked at number 4 in New Zealand's album charts, including #1 on the list of Aotearoa albums. It is a finalist for the 2026 Taite Music Prize.

== Musical style ==
Massive magazine described Tom Scott's work with Home Brew as being "fun and satirical" and featuring "well-rehearsed flows"; The Spinoff has characterized his work from that era as "frank, controversial and at times even shocking". While Scott's lyrical content in Home Brew was widely known for "drug and alcohol-fuelled songs", he has moved away from that content on his more recent projects. Scott's lyrics in Avantdale Bowling Club have been described as "blending working-class storytelling and New Zealand colloquialisms", and as being "deeply personal and affecting".

Nick Bollinger of Radio New Zealand described Scott's early work as "quick, witty, [and] occasionally anti-social", and characterized his performance with Avantdale Bowling Club as "polyrhythmic rhyming" that is "mature, reflective, and cautiously hopeful". Karl Puschmann of The New Zealand Herald identified a similar progression, describing Scott as "delight[ing] in being as juvenile and obnoxious as possible" with Home Brew before featuring increasingly more mature work with his succeeding projects.

== Awards ==
Tom Scott's seven appearances as a Taite Music Prize finalist, including two in 2013, is a record.

Tom Scott in the Taite Music Prize
Year	Act	Album	Result
2013	Home Brew	Home Brew	Nominated
2013	@Peace	@Peace	Nominated
2014	@Peace	Girl Songs	Nominated
2015	@Peace	Example	Nominated
2019	Avantdale Bowling Club	Avantdale Bowling Club	Won
2024	Home Brew	Run It Back	Nominated
2026	Tom Scott	ANITYA	Pending

With Home Brew, Scott won 2012's New Zealand Music Award for Best Rap Album. The group had three other nominations and arrived at the ceremony with a goat on a leash. At 2019's awards Avantdale Bowling Club was named Album of the Year.

Scott was nominated for the APRA Silver Scroll in 2019, for 'Years Gone By', and 2023 for 'Friday Night @ The Liquor Store'. Both songs are by Avantdale Bowling Club.

== Personal life ==
As of 2018, Scott was engaged. By the time Run It Back was released in 2023, he was separated from his partner.

Scott has two sons, the first of whom was born in the late 2010s. Scott has stated that he left Melbourne for Avondale because he wanted to raise his son in New Zealand.

== Discography ==
=== Solo ===
- Anitya (2025)

=== with Home Brew ===
- Home Brew Light (2007)
- Last Week (2008)
- Taste Test (2009)
- Summer Ale (2009)
- Home Brew (2012)
- Run It Back (2023)

=== with Max Marx ===
- Max Marx and Friedrich Calloway at Carnegie Hall (2010)

=== with At Peace ===
- @Peace (2012)
- Girl Songs (2013)
- @Peace and the Plutonian Noise Symphony (2014)

=== with Average Rap Band ===
- Stream of Nonsenseness (2015)
- El Sol (2016)

=== with Avantdale Bowling Club ===
- Avantdale Bowling Club (2018)
- Trees (2022)
