= Proud: An Urban-Pacific Streetsoul Compilation =

Compilation album by Various
- Released: May 2, 1994
- Recorded: Uptown Studios, Freemans Bay, Auckland
- Genres: Hip hop, R&B
- Labels: Second Nature, Volition Records
- Producer: Alan Jansson

Proud: An Urban Pacific Streetsoul Compilation is a 1994 New Zealand hip hop and R&B compilation album. It was released in New Zealand by Second Nature Records and in Australia by Volition Records, and later rereleased in New Zealand by Huh! Records in 2000 and then on vinyl for the first time on 26 May 2023, again on Huh! Records. Proud has been described as "one of the most important NZ releases in the past decades" by New Zealand music industry figure Simon Grigg.

== Background ==
The album had its origins with the work of record producer Alan Jansson. In his Freemans Bay recording studio, Uptown Studios, he was impressed with the young hip hop and R&B acts from South Auckland and West Auckland who were recording at the studio, and the initial success of the resulting singles. Encouraged by Andrew Penhallow of the Australian label Volition Records, Jansson started work on a compilation album to showcase the new musical talent of Auckland.

While the album was based around hip hop and R&B music, Jansson's production emphasised the Pacific sounds of the songs - log drumming, ukuleles and 'Maori strumming', though some performers felt their songs did not sound American enough. Breaking from the urban styles of the rest of the album, the final two tracks featured acoustic log drumming ("Pacific Beats") and an a cappella version of the New Zealand national anthem. The resulting album was received well in both New Zealand and Australia.

== Proud tour ==
In 1994, Otara Millionaires Club's Phil Fuemana organised the national Proud tour, in order to promote the acts featured on the album. Fuemana described it as "like a modern version of Motown – taking the talent and travelling around the country with it." The tour included the Otara Millionaires Club (and singer Sina) and Sisters Underground. The tour lost money, but boosted the profile of the featured acts.

== Legacy ==
The main breakout act from Proud was the Otara Millionaires Club. The following year, as the OMC, Pauly Fuemana had a worldwide hit single with "How Bizarre". Hip hop duo Sisters Underground had two tracks on the album, including "In the Neighbourhood", which is now regarded as a landmark single for both in the emerging South Auckland music scene of the 1990s and for New Zealand music as a whole. Musician and producer Phil Fuemana contributed to two tracks on Proud and continued his work with the South Auckland music scene, developing the urban Pasifika sound. Hip hop performers Herman Loto (Ermehn) and Sani Sagala (Dei Hamo) later had local success with their solo work.

The album is now considered a hallmark of New Zealand music, and was one of the featured albums in music journalist Nick Bollinger's 2009 book 100 Essential New Zealand Albums.

In 2022 Alan Jansson won the Taite Music Prize's Independent Music NZ Classic Record award for the album.

== Charting singles ==
Two singles from the album charted in the New Zealand singles chart.

Year	Act	Song	Peak NZ chart positions
1992	Semi MC's	"Trust Me"	27
1994	Sisters Underground	"In the Neighbourhood"	6

== Track listing ==
No.	Title	Lyrics	Music	Artist	Length
1.	"In the Neighbourhood"	Brenda Makamoeafi, Hassanah Iroegbu	Alan Jansson, Lee Baker	Sisters Underground	3:33
2.	"Tuesday Blues"	Sane Sagala, Johnny Sagala	S Sagala, J Sagala, Jansson, Andy Vann, DJ Chris Halavaka	Pacifican Descendants	3:48
3.	"We R The O.M.C."	Paul Ave, Paul Fuemana, Phillip Fuemana, Herman Loto	Phillip Fuemana, Loto	Otara Millionaires Club	6:14
4.	"Bassed on a Lost Cause"	Loto, Jeremy Toomata	Phillip Fuemana	Radio Backstab & DJ Payback	4:43
5.	"Pass It Over"	J Sagala, Mark Aiva, S Sagala	Jansson, Vann, Willie Boaza	Pacifican Descendants	3:53
6.	"Dawn of the Eve"	George Fesolai, Joseph Ekepati, Lani Ekepati, Mii Rongo, Neil Nili	Joseph Ekepati, Lani Ekepati, Mii Rongo	Di-Na-Ve	5:32
7.	"One Too Many"	Frank Elia	Frank Elia	Vocal Five	3:36
8.	"I Don't Need You"	James Waterhouse, Sam Feo	Karl Benton, Digi Brothers, Hiran Benton	Semi MC's	4:33
9.	"Ain't It True"	Makamoeafi, Iroegbu	Jansson, Mark De Clive-Lowe	Sisters Underground	3:36
10.	"Groove Me"	Rima Nicolas	Ina George	Rhythm Harmony	3:46
11.	"Trust Me"	Hiran Benton	Digi Brothers	Semi MC's	3:54
12.	"Prove Me Wrong"	Charlie Brown	Jansson, Vann, Junior Satele	MC Slam	3:52
13.	"Pacific Beats"		Puka Puka	Puka Puka	2:01
14.	"God Defend New Zealand"	Thomas Bracken	John Joseph Woods	Vocal Five	1:36
