= Homebrew =

Homebrewing mainly refers to small-scale, non-commercial manufacture of a drink, typically beer.

Homebrew or home brew may also refer to:

== Computing ==
- Homebrew Computer Club
- Homebrew (package manager), for macOS and Linux
- Homebrew (video games), software written by hobbyists for proprietary game consoles
  - Atari 2600 homebrew
  - PlayStation Portable homebrew
  - PlayStation 3 homebrew

== Music and media ==
- Homebrew (Neneh Cherry album)
- Homebrew (Steve Howe album), 1996
- Homebrew, song by the band 311 from their album Grassroots (album)
- Homebrew, album by Paul Lansky
- Home Brew (band) (also known as Home Brew Crew), a New Zealand hip hop group
  - Home Brew (album), the first studio album by the group
- "Home Brew" (The Green Green Grass), an episode from the sitcom

== Other ==
- Amateur radio homebrew
- Custom rules or content in tabletop roleplaying games
