= On the Run (OMC song) =

Single by OMC

from the album How Bizarre
- Released: 18 January 1997
- Recorded: 1995
- Genre: Alternative hip hop, Urban Pasifika, surf rock
- Length: 4:03
- Label: Huh!
- Songwriter: Pauly Fuemana
- Producers: Alan Jansson; Pauly Fuemana

OMC singles chronology
"Right On" (1996)	"On the Run" (1997)	"Land of Plenty" (1997)

Music video
- "On the Run" on YouTube

"On the Run" is a song by Niuean-New Zealand singer-songwriter Pauly Fuemana, as part of his music project OMC, short for Otara Millionaires Club. One of OMC's most successful singles other than their worldwide smash hit, "How Bizarre", it received high acclaim, and was considered the stand out of the album, from which it came (also called How Bizarre). The song reached number 56 in the United Kingdom, number 30 in New Zealand, and number 82 in Germany.
