= List of artists who reached number one on the U.S. Pop Airplay chart =

This is a list of recording artists who have reached number one on Billboard magazine's Pop Airplay chart (previously known as Mainstream Top 40, Pop Songs, and Top 40/CHR).

- All acts are listed alphabetically.
- Solo artists are alphabetised by last name, Groups by group name excluding "A," "An" and "The.".
- Each act's total of number-one singles is shown after their name.
- Featured artists that have been given credit on the record are included

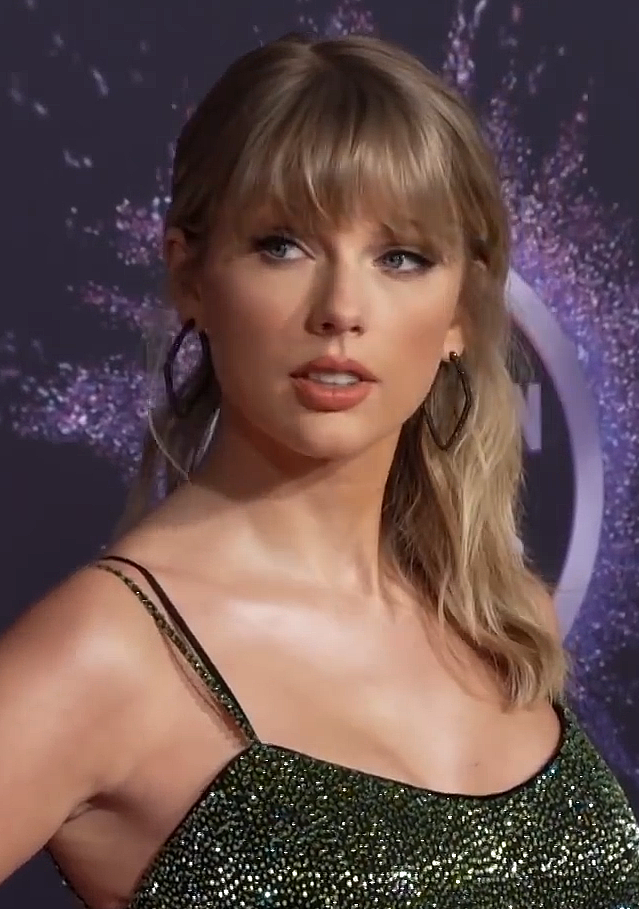
Taylor Swift has the record for the most number-one songs with 16.

== 0-9 ==
- 2 Chainz (1)
- 3 Doors Down (3)
- 3OH!3 (1)
- 5 Seconds of Summer (1)
- 24kGoldn (1)
- 50 Cent (1)

== A ==
- Ace of Base (3)
- Bryan Adams (1)
- Gracie Abrams (1)
- Adele (5)
- Aerosmith (1)
- Afrojack (1)
- Christina Aguilera (5)
- All-4-One (1)
- The All-American Rejects (1)
- A$AP Rocky (1)
- Avicii (1)
- Iggy Azalea (3)

== B ==
- Backstreet Boys (2)
- Sara Bareilles (1)
- Barenaked Ladies (1)
- Bastille (1)
- Bazzi (1)
- Lou Bega (1)
- Regina Belle (1)
- Lauren Bennett (1)
- Benson Boone (1)
- Beyoncé (7)
- Justin Bieber (11)
- Big Mountain (1)
- The Black Eyed Peas (3)
- Benny Blanco (1)
- Mary J. Blige (2)
- B.o.B (1)
- Boyz II Men (4)
- Meredith Brooks (1)
- Chris Brown (3)
- Sleepy Brown (1)
- Peabo Bryson (1)

== C ==
- Camila Cabello (5)
- Daniel Caesar (1)
- Blu Cantrell (1)
- Lewis Capaldi (2)
- Alessia Cara (3)
- Cardi B (2)
- The Cardigans (1)
- Mariah Carey (6)
- Vanessa Carlton (1)
- Sabrina Carpenter (6)
- Doja Cat (8)
- The Chainsmokers (3)
- Chumbawamba (1)
- Ciara (1)
- Kelly Clarkson (4)
- Coldplay (1)
- Creed (1)
- Sheryl Crow (1)
- Taio Cruz (2)
- Miley Cyrus (3)

== D ==
- DaBaby (2)
- Trevor Daniel (1)
- Daughtry (1)
- Gavin DeGraw (1)
- Daya (1)
- Dazy (1)
- Olivia Dean (2)
- Jason Derulo (5)
- Destiny's Child (2)
- DHT (1)
- P. Diddy (1)
- Celine Dion (3)
- Iann Dior (1)
- DJ Snake (1)
- Doechii (1)
- Drake (1)
- Duran Duran (1)

== E ==
- Eagle-Eye Cherry (1)
- Billie Eilish (3)
- Missy Elliott (1)
- Eminem (4)
- Evanescence (1)
- Eve (1)
- Everything but the Girl (1)

== F ==
- Dionne Farris (1)
- Fergie (4)
- Fifth Harmony (1)
- Dominic Fike (1)
- Flo Rida (5)
- Jamie Foxx (1)
- Luis Fonsi (1)
- DJ Frank E (1)
- Nicki French (1)
- Fugees (1)
- Nelly Furtado (2)

== G ==
- G-Eazy (2)
- Gayle (1)
- Giveon (1)
- Glass Animals (1)
- Selena Gomez (4)
- Goo Goo Dolls (2)
- GoonRock (1)
- Ellie Goulding (2)
- Ariana Grande (11)
- Macy Gray (1)
- Green Day (1)
- Grey (1)
- Cee Lo Green (1)
- David Guetta (2)
- Gym Class Heroes (2)

== H ==
- Halsey (4)
- Hanson (1)
- Jack Harlow (2)
- Calvin Harris (1)
- The Heights (1)
- Don Henley (1)
- Keri Hilson (1)
- Hinder (1)
- Hoobastank (1)
- Niall Horan (1)
- Hootie & The Blowfish (1)
- Hozier (1)
- Whitney Houston (1)
- Huntrix (1)

== I ==
- Enrique Iglesias (1)
- Imagine Dragons (3)
- Natalie Imbruglia (1)
- Iyaz (1)

== J ==
- Felix Jaehn (1)
- Ja Rule (2)
- Janet Jackson (2)
- Jawsh 685 (1)
- Jay-Z (2)
- Wyclef Jean (1)
- Jewel (2)
- JID (1)
- Jennie (1)
- JoJo (1)
- Jonas Brothers (1)

== K ==
- R. Kelly (1)
- Kesha (3)
- Alicia Keys (2)
- Khalid (3)
- The Kid Laroi (1)
- Kings of Leon (1)
- Wiz Khalifa (2)
- Lenny Kravitz (1)
- Kyla (1)

== L ==
- Steve Lacy (1)
- Lady Gaga (8)
- Kendrick Lamar (3)
- Zara Larsson (2)
- Latto (2)
- Avril Lavigne (5)
- Murphy Lee (1)
- John Legend (1)
- Adam Levine (2)
- Donna Lewis (1)
- Leona Lewis (1)
- Lil Jon (1)
- Lil' Kim (1)
- Lil Nas X (3)
- Lil Wayne (1)
- Linkin Park (1)
- Dua Lipa (5)
- Lizzo (3)
- LL Cool J (1)
- LMFAO (1)
- Lisa Loeb (1)
- Jennifer Lopez (4)
- Lorde (1)
- Demi Lovato (2)
- Ludacris (3)
- Lukas Graham (1)

== M ==
- Machine Gun Kelly (1)
- Madonna (1)
- Magic! (1)
- Major Lazer (2)
- Post Malone (5)
- Mario (1)
- Maroon 5 (11)
- Bruno Mars (13)
- Ricky Martin (1)
- Matchbox Twenty (1)
- Jesse McCartney (1)
- Paul McCoy (1)
- Tim McGraw (1)
- Tate McRae (1)
- Shawn Mendes (3)
- MØ (2)
- Nicki Minaj (1)
- Maren Morris (1)
- Marshmello (1)
- Alanis Morissette (3)
- Jason Mraz (1)
- Shawn Mullins (1)
- Mýa (1)

== N ==
- 'NSync (2)
- Nayer (1)
- Nelly (5)
- Ne-Yo (2)
- NF (1)
- Nickelback (2)
- Nico & Vinz (1)
- Nine Days (1)
- No Doubt (3)
- Normani (2)

== O ==
- Colby O'Donis (1)
- OMC (1)
- OMI (1)
- OneRepublic (2)
- O-Town (1)
- Outkast (2)
- Rita Ora (1)

== P ==
- Panic! at the Disco (1)
- Sean Paul (4)
- Liam Payne (1)
- Katy Perry (11)
- Kim Petras (1)
- Pink (9)
- PinkPantheress (1)
- Pitbull (2)
- Portugal. The Man (1)
- Mike Posner (1)
- Pussycat Dolls (2)
- Charlie Puth (2)

== Q ==
- Quavo (2)

== R ==
- R. City (1)
- Rayvon (1)
- Real McCoy (1)
- Rema (1)
- The Rembrandts (1)
- Bebe Rexha (2)
- Tommy Richman (1)
- Rihanna (11)
- Rikrok (1)
- Chappell Roan (2)
- Olivia Rodrigo (3)
- Mark Ronson (1)
- Rosé (1)
- Kelly Rowland (1)

== S ==
- Santana (1)
- Savage Garden (3)
- Seal (1)
- Jay Sean (1)
- Shaboozey (1)
- Shaggy (2)
- Shakira (1)
- Ed Sheeran (4)
- Sia (1)
- Ashlee Simpson (1)
- Jessica Simpson (1)
- Sixpence None the Richer (1)
- Slim Thug (1)
- Smash Mouth (1)
- Myles Smith(1)
- Sam Smith(2)
- Patty Smyth (1)
- Snoop Dogg (2)
- Sombr (1)
- Britney Spears (6)
- Spin Doctors (1)
- Gwen Stefani (2)
- Rod Stewart (1)
- Sting (1)
- Patrick Stump (1)
- Harry Styles (4)
- Sugar Ray (1)
- Taylor Swift (16)
- Teddy Swims (2)
- SZA (4)

== T ==
- Tame Impala (1)
- Third Eye Blind (1)
- Rob Thomas (1)
- T.I. (3)
- Timbaland (3)
- Justin Timberlake (8)
- TLC (1)
- Meghan Trainor (1)
- twenty one pilots (2)
- Ty Dolla $ign (2)
- Tyler, The Creator (1)
- T-Pain (1)

== U ==
- UB40 (1)
- Usher (2)

== W ==
- Morgan Wallen (1)
- Alex Warren (1)
- The Weeknd (5)
- Kanye West (3)
- Pharrell Williams (2)
- Wizkid (1)

== X ==
- Charli XCX (2)

== Y ==
- Daddy Yankee (1)
- Young Thug (1)
- Lola Young (1)
- Nicky Youre (1)

== Z ==
- ZAYN (1)
- Zedd (2)
