= Pauly Fuemana =

New Zealand singer and songwriter (1969–2010)

Background information
- Born: Paul Lawrence Fuemana; 8 February 1969; Auckland, New Zealand
- Origin: Ōtara, New Zealand
- Died: 31 January 2010 (aged 40) North Shore City, New Zealand
- Occupations: Singer; songwriter; musician
- Instruments: Vocals; guitar
- Years active: 1992–2010
- Formerly of: OMC

Paul Lawrence Fuemana (8 February 1969 – 31 January 2010) was a New Zealand singer, songwriter and musician from Auckland. One of the first globally successful pioneers of his country's unique style of hip-hop, Fuemana was one of New Zealand's greatest popular music icons of the 1990s.

Born in Ōtara, South Auckland, to a Niuean father and a Māori mother, Fuemana gravitated towards making music with his brothers due to his poverty-stricken childhood. Speaking Niuean as his first language, his music with OMC often reflected Polynesian themes. Leading the rap trio and then joint music project, the Otara Millionaires Club (abbreviated to OMC) his debut studio album How Bizarre (1996) and its eponymous lead single became a huge success across the world. The name OMC was ironic, as Ōtara was one of the poorest communities in New Zealand. Along with his brother Phil Fuemana, Pauly cultivated the unique South Auckland musical genre of Urban Pasifika, bringing it to worldwide commercial and critical acclaim.

OMC was often considered a one-hit wonder because of the unequalled success of "How Bizarre", which overshadowed their other, relatively successful work, such as the singles "On the Run", "Never Coming Back" and "Land of Plenty". In a 1997 interview, Fuemana reflected on what was once a witticism to himself and his home – an "Otara millionaire" – now represented his reality. Shortly after his rise to fame, OMC was put on indefinite hiatus due to disputes with his US record label. In 1998, he was also involved in a lawsuit filed by his producer and co-writer Alan Jansson over royalties due to Jansson. It was settled in arbitration. Fuemana focused on his wife Kristine and six children, but grew sick during the mid 2000s; by the end of the decade, he had been diagnosed with chronic inflammatory demyelinating polyneuropathy, an extremely rare neurological disorder similar to multiple sclerosis. Fuemana kept his illness private. He died in 2010, at age 40.

== Early life ==
Paul Lawrence Fuemana was born on 8 February 1969 in Auckland, to parents Takiula Fuemana and Olivia Hohaia. He was of half-Niuean and half-Māori descent. His father, Takiula Fuemana, was originally from Mutalau, Niue, before emigrating to New Zealand, while his mother was Taranaki Māori. Fuemana was the youngest of four children.

Fuemana was raised in Ōtara, a suburb in South Auckland with a large Pacific Islander population.

== OMC ==
Otara Millionaires Club was formed by older brother Phil Fuemana and was passed on to Pauly Fuemana. The name was tongue in cheek, as the Ōtara neighbourhood was one of Auckland's poorest communities. Pauly later shortened the band's name to OMC, forming a musical partnership with Alan Jansson, who co-wrote and produced the How Bizarre album. Signed to Auckland independent label Huh Records by Simon Grigg, OMC reached worldwide fame in 1996 and 1997 with the single "How Bizarre", from their debut album of the same name. OMC and Jansson ceased recording in 1998 but recorded again in 2005 to 2007. Recording "4 All Of Us", a single that featured Lucy Lawless, Fuemana's portion of the royalties was donated to the Race Relations Commission.

"How Bizarre", which was named Single of the Year at the 1996 New Zealand Music Awards, hit number one around the world, including Australia, Austria, Canada, Ireland and New Zealand. In 2002, it reached No. 71 on the list of 100 Greatest One-Hit Wonders. The single was a chart hit in many countries and spent multiple weeks at number one in several countries, reaching the top for two weeks in Austria, three weeks in Ireland, three weeks in New Zealand and five weeks in Australia.

Fuemana often spoke about the song: "I put a lot of hidden stories in there so people could read between the lines and sense it for what it is instead of telling them, 'Yeah, we got pulled over by the cops, and my mate got his head smashed in, and we got arrested, and they found some pot on him'," he told Reuters in a 1997 interview.

Fuemana declared bankruptcy in 2006.

"How Bizarre" is still played worldwide years after its release. More than a million copies of the How Bizarre album were sold. It is one of the most successful songs recorded in New Zealand. OMC was voted #34 on the APRA Top 100 New Zealand Songs of All Time.

== Death and legacy ==
Fuemana died at North Shore Hospital on 31 January 2010, aged 40, of respiratory failure following a protracted battle with chronic inflammatory demyelinating polyneuropathy. His health had been declining for several years, and he developed pneumonia a few months before his death.

He is survived by his wife, Kirstine Fuemana, a New Zealander whom he had met in 1993 and married in 2002, and his six children.

Fuemana's funeral was held on 5 February 2010, at the Pacific Island Presbyterian Church in Newton, New Zealand. The 200 attendees included rappers Dei Hamo, Ermehn and Darryl Thompson (also known as DLT), Alan Jansson, Simon Grigg, Nathan Haines, and Len Brown, the Mayor of Auckland.

Posthumously, Fuemana's music has found success on TikTok.
