= Nā mele paleoleo =

Hawaiian hip hop genre

- Other names: Hawaiian rap
- Stylistic origins: Hip hop, American hip hop, Reggae, Punk rock, Alternative rock, Hawaiian music
- Cultural origins: Late 1980s–early 1990s, Hawaii, United States
- Typical instruments: Vocals, Turntable, Sampler (musical instrument), Drum machine

Regional scenes
- Hawaii

Other topics
- Hawaiian sovereignty movement, Hawaiian language, Hawaiian Pidgin

Nā mele paleoleo (sg. mele pāleoleo lit. "song that speaks loudly and angrily") is a Hawaiian hip hop genre that fuses rap with lyrics in the Hawaiian language, Hawaiian Pidgin, or both. It emerged in Hawaii in the late 1980s as an expression of land struggles, cultural survival, social justice, and distrust of institutional power. Through protest performances it evolved into a recorded form in the 1990s tied strongly to the Hawaiian sovereignty movement. The term itself gained wider public use in that era and is associated with sovereignty-era advocacy. Recognized as a form of Hawaiian performance poetry, nā mele paleoleo continues to serve as both artistic expression and political statement.

== History ==
=== Early protest era (MC Frumpy and DJ ELITE) ===
Nā mele paleoleo first emerged in the late 1980s with Honolulu-based hip hop artists Charlotte "MC Frumpy" Kaluna and her hānai-brother Joseph "DJ ELITE" Netherland. (Note: Coverage of these performances appears in local press and oral history. Reliable sources do not credit MC Frumpy, DJ ELITE, BUZ 1, or Danny R with coining or developing the Hawaiian term nā mele paleoleo.) Netherland is active as part of the DJ/turntablist and production super-group CrossFade Disciples (CFD) and the rap and production super-group 808 Natives, where he collaborated with lyricist and producer Daniel "Danny R" Rose, who contributed to music production and songwriting. Frumpy and ELITE were later joined by Frumpy's protege Jason "BUZ 1" Tavares, described in a PBS Hawaiʻi profile as an underground freestyle lyricist active with groups such as Hi-State Family, VM, and Moʻilla Pillaz. Tavares's high-energy lyricism and performances complemented the protest orientation of Frumpy and ELITE.

Their work drew on the confrontational edge of conscious hip hop acts such as Public Enemy, Boogie Down Productions (particularly KRS-One), Queen Latifah, and early Ice Cube solo releases. They were also shaped by early 1990s punk and alternative groups including Bikini Kill and Rage Against the Machine.

Alongside these global influences, their artistic base remained grounded in Hawaiian culture and traditional spirituality. They often drew on imagery associated with koa, traditional warriors. MC Frumpy and DJ ELITE performed at public protest rallies. They also opened for touring politically engaged acts while those artists were in Hawaii.

Their lyrics critiqued issues such as dispossession, police brutality, political corruption, and the suppression and revival of the Hawaiian language. They also echoed broader themes common in conscious hip hop, including racism, poverty, social inequality, and war.

Through this fusion, MC Frumpy, DJ ELITE, and proteges such as BUZ 1 helped establish a hip hop scene rooted in activism and protest culture. Their performances were confrontational and agitational. The genre functioned as a tool of resistance in public demonstrations rather than a recorded, commercial style at this stage.

They also drew explicit historical parallels. Their lyrics criticized the planter and merchant elite tied to the 1893 Overthrow of the Hawaiian Kingdom, including figures associated with the Committee of Safety (Hawaii) and the later Nā Hui Nui ʻElima companies.

=== Sovereignty era (Sudden Rush) ===
By the mid-1990s the genre reached broader visibility in the recorded music scene through the Hilo-based group Sudden Rush. Their 1995 debut album Nation on the Rise helped focus recognition on the style and its themes of land, sovereignty, and cultural survival. Sudden Rush's blend of rap, reggae, and Hawaiian chanting, especially the rapid-fire kepakepa style, helped define the genre.

Scholars credit Sudden Rush with carrying the label nā mele paleoleo into recorded music and wider public discourse in the 1990s, linking it explicitly to sovereignty politics.

Their later albums and singles continued this emphasis.

Sudden Rush's work marked a transition from underground protest performance to album-based advocacy, shaping nā mele paleoleo into a recognized genre of Hawaiian music and formalizing its identity in the popular imagination.

== Characteristics ==
Nā mele paleoleo differs from much commercial U.S. hip hop by avoiding themes of violence, materialism, and sexual objectification, instead foregrounding language revitalization, indigenous pride, and political awareness. Songs often incorporate Pidgin Creole English alongside Hawaiian, serving as both artistic expression and political statement. Code-switching and multilingual delivery are noted features in studies of language use in Hawaiʻi.

Scholars describe the style as both a response to cultural suppression during and after colonization and a vehicle for community healing and reclaiming indigenous voice. Performing rap in Hawaiian is framed as an act of decolonization and language revitalization.

== Legacy ==
Nā mele paleoleo continues to influence Hawaiian, Pacific, and indigenous musicians and is a subject of academic study in indigenous and popular music. It remains a medium for Native Hawaiian musicians to express cultural pride, resistance, and contemporary social realities.

Donald Keʻala Kawaʻauhau Jr. (April 9, 1971 – August 27, 2018), a founding member of Sudden Rush, is remembered for his broadcasting career and for his statements about the naming of the style. In a 1998 interview cited by Halifu Osumare, Kawaʻauhau said he worked with language authorities to have the phrase nā mele paleoleo recognized as the Hawaiian term for rap.

== See also ==
- Music of Hawaii
- Hawaiian sovereignty movement
- Hawaiian language
- Hawaiian Pidgin
- Hip hop music
- Reggae

Related regional scenes

- Samoan hip-hop
- New Zealand hip-hop
