= Home Brew (album) =

Studio album by Home Brew
- Released: 1 May 2012
- Genres: New Zealand hip hop, jazz rap
- Length: 89:58
- Labels: Young, Gifted & Broke
- Producer: Harry "Haz Beats" Huavi

Home Brew chronology
Taste Test (2009)	Home Brew (2012)	Run It Back (2023)

Home Brew is the first studio album by New Zealand hip-hop group Home Brew. It was released by Young, Gifted & Broke on 1 May 2012. The album draws mainly from the genre of New Zealand hip hop, but is also jazz-influenced. Home Brew was promoted by a 48-hour-long release party and a six-show tour of New Zealand cities. The album was lauded by critics, and won the New Zealand Music Award for Best Urban/Hip Hop Album. It debuted top of the New Zealand Albums Chart.

== Content ==
Home Brew is a New Zealand hip hop album with heavy jazz influences. It features keyboard instruments, horns, saxophones, guitars and bass. It is divided into two discs: Light and Dark. Light embraces welfare fraud ("Benefit"), alcoholism ("Alcoholic") and using datura as a recreational drug ("Datura/White Flowers"). "Basketball Court" and "Radio" are about nostalgia and memories. Dark includes "State of Mind", on which band member Tom Scott reflects on his father's time in prison, and "The Truth is Ugly", where he discusses his shortcomings in past romantic relationships. "Listen to Us" criticises the government. Thirty-three songs were recorded for the album; twenty-one made the final cut.

== Release and promotion ==
Home Brew was released in New Zealand and Australia by the independent record label Young, Gifted & Broke on 1 May 2012. A 48-hour-long launch party titled Home Brew Speakeasy was held from 5 May to 7 May at Shooters Saloon in Kingsland, Auckland; tickets included a copy of the album. In July 2013, Home Brew toured New Zealand on the Home Brew Speakeasy Tour. They performed one show each in Auckland, Hamilton, Wellington, Queenstown, Dunedin and Christchurch. Prior to the album's release, music videos were released for the tracks "Listen to Us" and "Yellow Snot Funk".

== Reception ==
Writing for The Dominion Post, Luke Appleby praised the album's beats, instrumentation and lyrical honesty, and gave it five out of five stars. Lydia Jenkin of The New Zealand Herald rated Home Brew four and a half stars out of five. John Hayden from the Otago Daily Times picked Home Brew as one of the top albums of 2012. At the 2012 New Zealand Music Awards, Home Brew was nominated in the categories of Album of the Year, Best Group, Breakthrough Artist of the Year and Best Urban/Hip Hop Album; it won the Urban/Hip Hop Award.

Home Brew did not receive much promotion from airplay or television screening due to the profanities contained within the lyrics. However, the album debuted at number one on the New Zealand Albums Chart—the first New Zealand hip hop album to do so since Scribe's The Crusader (2003)— due to high digital pre-ordering. The album remained on the albums chart for fifteen weeks. It was one of seven finalists for the 2013 Taite Music Prize.

== Track listing ==
Disc one: Light

1. "Dedicated To (Intro)" – 5:00
2. "Benefit" – "4:38"
3. "Alcoholic" – 4:44
4. "Yellow Snot Funk" – 3:06
5. "Datura/White Flowers" (featuring Lui Tuiasau) – 3:28
6. "Everybody" (featuring Lui Tuiasau and Lucky Lance) – 4:08
7. "Last Day" – 4:45
8. "Time Don't Wait" – 2:52
9. "Basketball Court" (featuring Esther Stephens) – 5:52
10. "Radio" – 4:04
11. "Radio Outro" – 4:21

Disc two: Dark

1. "Dark Intro" – 2:12
2. "State of Mind" – 3:39
3. "Plastic Magic" (featuring Esther Stephens) – 5:20
4. "The Truth is Ugly" – 3:31
5. "55 Stories" – 4:47
6. "Listen to Us" (featuring Tourettes, Esther Stephens and Matthew Crawley) – 5:54
7. "Good God" (featuring Tyna Keelan and Hollie Smith) – 4:37
8. "Bourbon & Coke" – 3:28
9. "Fungi/Absence" (featuring Lui Tuiasau) – 4:35
10. "Space" (featuring Esther Stephens) – 4:57

== See also ==
- List of number-one albums in 2012 (New Zealand)
