= Sudden Rush =

Hawaiian hip hop band

- Origin: Hilo, Hawaii
- Genres: Nā mele paleoleo, Hip hop
- Years active: 1993–present
- Members: Shane Veincent; Caleb Richards; Don Keʻala Kawaʻauhau; Rob Onekea
- Past members: Thane K. Leialoha
- Website: Official website

Sudden Rush is a nā mele paleoleo (Hawaiian hip hop/rap) group from Hilo, Hawaii, comprising Shane Veincent ("Kid Dynomite"), Caleb Richards ("Red Eye"/"Pakalo"), Don Keʻala Kawaʻauhau Jr. ("King Don 1") and Rob Onekea ("Radical Rob"). They have been called the most well-known and successful of the Hawaiian hip hop groups and were the first to blend American hip hop with Hawaiian language and musical style to produce nā mele paleoleo. Formed in 1993, they released three studio albums in the next ten years, followed by the belated Overthrow EP in 2018. Their music is explicitly political and supportive of the Hawaiian sovereignty movement.

== History ==
Sudden Rush formed in 1993 and were the first group to record nā mele paleoleo, a form of music blending American hip hop with Hawaiian rap. The name of the band comes from Veincent's father's roadster. From the beginning there were four members of the group, Shane Veincent ("Kid Dynomite"), Caleb Richards ("Red Eye" or "Pakalo") and Don Keʻala Kawaʻauhau Jr. (King Don One), and "Radical Rob" Onekea. In the early 1990s a fifth person played with them, Thane K. Leialoha, to whom the rest of the band remained close. He was shot dead after escaping a prison transport van on April 11, 2006, having been rearrested for breaking the terms of his parole. His family sued the state for as a result of his death, claiming an eighth amendment violation, but in 2008 their claim was dismissed.

Cover art of Kuʻe (1997)

Sudden Rush's first album was Nation on the Rise. Their second, Kuʻe (Resist), was released in 1997. Due to listener demand, radio stations such as I-94, KCCN-FM and KINE played several songs from it extensively, including "Polynesian Party", "Don't Blame the Youth" and "Paradise Found". Kuʻe featured collaborations with Keali'i Reichel and Willie K, John Cruz and 'Ehukai. They won awards for Best Recording By A Rap Artist/Vocalist at the Hawaii Music Awards, and performed at the ceremony on April 26, 1988, with Tenderoni. The Artist award was for Kuʻe and the Vocalist award was for "Polynesian Party". Both awards were voted for by the public.

Kuʻe, like their other work, was political, tied to Hawaii's history and its present-day sovereignty movement. It includes, for example, "Eku Maumau", which is a chant used at Hawaiian sovereignty demonstrations. This political motivation was reflected in the cover art, which featured a parody of Iwo Jima Monument, but with an upside-down Hawaiian flag. Drawn in the style of a newspaper on red paper, it also shows a story about the forced abdication of Liliʻuokalani, Queen of Hawaii, on January 17, 1893. Fay Yokomizo Akindes writes that "The presence of the past is evident throughout Sudden Rush's work, both visually and aurally" and also takes note of the art on the disc itself and the back cover, which shows Veincent, Richards and Keʻala crouching at their fathers' feet. Sudden Rush's first performance in the mainland US was on May 1, 1999, in Las Vegas.

In 2002, their song "Ea", meaning "sovereignty", "rule" or "independence", or "life", spent two weeks on the Billboard World Albums chart, peaking at number 12 on September 7, 2002. The song made use of "Kawika" by The Sunday Manoa, a popular song of the Hawaiian resistance movement. The album of the same name, released in August 2002, featured collaborations with Willie K, Amy Hānaialiʻi Gilliom, Jon Osorio, and Fiji, among others. They performed at the Teen Choice Awards in the same year.

After Ea, Sudden Rush did not release new music for fifteen years and were described as having broken up in 2003. They continued to perform together and in June 2009 they were planning to release two more albums during the year, titled Hana Hou (Encore) and The Overthrow. As of 2011 they were planning a remix album.

In 2017, after releasing several singles, Sudden Rush reconnected with producer 'Radical Rob' and began recording new music. The EP "Overthrow" was finally released on January 17, 2018. featuring 6 new songs, including the first full hip-hop, rap song done in ʻŌlelo Hawaiʻi (Hawaiian language), and featuring other Hawaiian-speaking artists such as Ka'ikena Scanlan, Homework Simpson and Firewoman. As of May 2018, they were recording their fourth full-length album, set to be released in the summer.

Keʻala Kawaʻauhau died on August 27, 2018.

== Members ==
- Shane Veincent ("Kid Dynomite") also plays with the non-profit supergroup Mana Maoli Collective, which raises money for Na Lei Naʻauao, the Native Hawaiian Charter School Alliance.
- Caleb Richards ("Pakalo" or "Red Eye")
- Don Keʻala Kawaʻauhau Jr. ("King Don One") (d. August 27, 2018) was a DJ on Hilo's KWXX-FM, starting out in at drive time. His final show at the station was the weekday Breakfast Luau show along with Loeka Longakit. When the band formed, he was studying Hawaiian studies at the University of Hawaii at Hilo. Before that he went to St. Joseph High School, where he played basketball.
- Rob Onekea ("Radical Rob"). The producer of the group, Onekea has sometimes not been listed as a member of the band, but was part of the original line-up and on the cover of their third album, Ea. He has acted as their spokesman and announced the release of Overthrow on his Instagram.

Because of the economics of Hawaiian life, the members had other jobs as well as being in Sudden Rush. For example, in 2001 Keʻala Kawaʻauhau taught at a Pūnana Leo Hawaiian language pre-school and was training as a wrestler. The group has been managed by Kwai-Chang Publico.

=== Past members ===
- Thane K. Leialoha (early 1990s, died 2006)

== Musical style and impact ==
Sudden Rush's style of music, nā mele paleoleo, combines hip hop and Hawaiian music in a way that contrasts with the traditional Hawaiian notion of kaona—hidden meaning—which is the use of euphemism and coded metaphor to convey political, sexual or otherwise delicate meanings. Their approach has been described as "raw" and "honest", and as being assertively—or defiantly—Hawaiian. Fay Yokomizo Akindes, describing the title track of Kuʻe, wrote that "The rap is fresh and unfamiliar: it is nā mele paleoleo, Hawaiian hip hop, a cut 'n' mix of African and Jamaican reggae rhythms, Hawaiian chanting, and subversive rapping in the English and Hawaiian languages. The result is a complex multi-layering of sounds." "Na mele paleoleo" itself means "songs that speak loudly and angrily" and in a 1998 interview with Halifu Osumare, Keʻala said that it was him that got the term approved as the official Hawaiian term for rap.

Among the Hawaiian styles that Sudden Rush incorporates is kepakepa, a form of Hawaiian chanting characterized by a conversational style and rapid delivery. In a review of Kuʻe, John Woodhouse wrote: "Blending Hawaiian chant and English lyrics with hip-hop's gritty dance beat, Sudden Rush create a polished, urban sound on songs that explore topical Hawaiian issues like sovereignty, drug use, and cultural pride". Their work includes lyrics in Hawaiian, English and Hawaiian Pidgin. These two factors—native language and cultural pride—have had an influence on music in other island nations, including in Melanesia. Their music has less representation of sex and violence than American hip hop of the same era, and which other Hawaiian hip hop artists adopted in the late 1990s and early 2000s. They deliberately avoided swearing on Kuʻe.

In their use of Hawaiian-language rap and hip hop, Sudden Rush is unmatched – and culturally important

— John Berger, Honolulu Star-Bulletin, 2002

There were other hip hop groups around at the time that Sudden Rush formed in the early 1990s, including Urban Joint from Oahu, but their style was that of the mainland US. American influences in Sudden Rush's hybrid style include Heavy D, Ice Cube, Queen Latifah, N.W.A and Naughty by Nature. Although they have been called the most successful and influential Hawaiian hip hop band, they consider themselves part of the "Polynesian Underground" and an underdog in the broader music scene. Within Hawaii, their recognition comes from an older audience than the fans of American-style hip hop.

== Politics ==
The group's work is deliberately political, aiming to spread the message of the Hawaiian sovereignty movement. Ku'ualoha Ho'omanawanui has written that "Aside from its smooth melding of Hawaiian, reggae, and rap sounds, Sudden Rush is noted for the strong pro-Hawaiian rights, pro-sovereignty message in its lyrics." John Woodhouse quotes Keʻala as saying "We're all part Hawaiian and the sovereignty issue is coming to the forefront, and we felt we could reach people who maybe don't like to read about it through the medium of music". As well as their music, which tries to challenge Western cultural hegemony and the impacts of tourism, they have themselves taken part in marches, vigils and rallies for Hawaiian sovereignty. They performed at a rally on the 100th anniversary of the annexation of Hawaii in 1998, in front of the Iolani Palace.

== Discography ==
Studio albums

Title	Year	Label	Date refs	Notes
Nation on the Rise	1994	Wreck X Shop		
Kuʻe (Resist)	1997	Way Out West Enterprises		
Ea	2002	Quiet Storm Records		Billboard World Albums number 12

EPs

Title	Release	Date refs
Overthrow	January 17, 2018	
