= Samoan hip-hop =

Music genre

Samoan hip-hop includes hip-hop music, artists and culture in Samoa Influenced by African Americans. At the root of hip-hop culture in Samoa is a focus on dancing, stemming from the importance of dance in traditional Samoan culture. According to Katerina Teaiwa from the University of Hawaii at Manoa, hip-hop culture is important for Samoan youth and the arts are transforming Samoans, including those outside of Samoa. This is especially visible among Samoan youth in California, Hawaii, and other communities in the Samoan diaspora. In Los Angeles, Samoan youth often engage in a style of hip-hop dancing called popping-and-locking.

According to April Henderson, young, recently-arrived Samoans in multi-ethnic neighborhoods seek status and respect by mastery of the "physical vocabularies" of dance or sport, aware of the accents that mark them as 'foreign'. Many hip-hop artists and dancers travel back and forth between Samoa and their other homes, creating channels for Samoan hip-hop to continue to develop and transform.

In the 2009 novel, South Pacific Survivor: In Samoa, Poly hip-hop is central to the assassin, a troubled character.

== Samoan hip-hop artists ==
- Boo-Yaa T.R.I.B.E.
- David Dallas
- Drew Deezy
- King Kapisi
- POETIK
- Mareko
- Onefour
- Savage
- SCRIBE

== See also ==
- New Zealand hip-hop
- Hawaiian hip-hop
