= 2012 New Zealand Music Awards =

Annual New Zealand music awards ceremony

- Awarded for: Excellence in New Zealand music
- Sponsored by: Vodafone
- Date: 1 November 2012
- Location: Vector Arena, Auckland
- Country: New Zealand
- Hosted by: Shannon Ryan and Ben Boyce
- Reward: Tui award trophy
- Website: http://www.nzmusicawards.co.nz

Television/radio coverage
- Network: Four

The 2012 New Zealand Music Awards was the 46th holding of the annual ceremony featuring awards for musical recording artists based in or originating from New Zealand. Finalists for the three technical awards were announced on 3 October 2012, the date on which finalists for 16 'non-technical' categories were also revealed.

The Critics Choice prize was announced on Wednesday 17 October, at the Kings Arms Tavern in Auckland. It was won by Watercolours (Chelsea Jade Metcalf).

The awards ceremony took place on 1 November 2012 at Vector Arena, Auckland. The ceremony was again hosted by television presenter Shannon Ryan and comedian Ben Boyce and was broadcast live on television channel Four.

The awards were dominated by Six60 with six awards, and Kimbra with five awards .

== Nominees and winners ==
Winners are listed first and highlighted in boldface.

Key
† – Non-technical award
‡ – Technical award

Album of the Year†	Single of the Year†
**Kimbra – Vows**; Home Brew – Home Brew; Opossom – Electric Hawaii; Six60 – Six60; The Adults – The Adults	Sponsored by Vodafone: **Six60 – "Don't Forget Your Roots"**; Annah Mac – "Girl in Stilettos"; Gin Wigmore – "Black Sheep"; Kimbra – "Warrior"; The Adults – "Nothing To Lose"
Best Group†	Breakthrough Artist of the Year†
Sponsored by Four: **Six60 – Six60**; Home Brew – Home Brew; Opossom – Electric Hawaii	Sponsored by Westpac Hotpoints: **Kimbra – Vows**; Annah Mac – Little Stranger; Home Brew – Home Brew
Best Male Solo Artist†	Best Female Solo Artist†
**Unknown Mortal Orchestra – Unknown Mortal Orchestra**; Bulletproof – Dub Me Crazy; Seth Haapu – Seth Haapu	**Kimbra – Vows**; Gin Wigmore – Gravel & Wine; Ladyhawke – Anxiety
Best Rock Album†	Best Pop Album†
Sponsored by Rockshop: **The Checks – Deadly Summer Sway**; Clap Clap riot – Counting Spins; Head Like a Hole – Blood Will Out	Sponsored by The Edge: **Kimbra – Vows**; Bic Runga – Belle; Gin Wigmore – Gravel & Wine
Best Urban / Hip Hop Album†	Best Roots Album†
**Home Brew – Home Brew**; Adeaze – Rise & Shine; Savage – Mayhem & Miracles	**The Black Seeds – Dust and Dirt**; Hollie Smith – Band of Brothers Vol.1 (Hollie Smith & Mara TK); Tomorrow People – ONE
Best Alternative Album†	Best Māori Album†
**Opossom – Electric Hawaii**; Ladyhawke – Anxiety; Unknown Mortal Orchestra – Unknown Mortal Orchestra	**Ria Hall – Ria Hall**; Upper Hutt Posse – Declaration of Resistance; Whirimako Black and Richard Nunns – Te More
Best Music Video†	Best Electronica Album†
Sponsored by NZ On Air: **Special Problems – "The Sun" (The Naked and Famous)**; Special Problems – "Take a Picture" (David Dallas); Special Problems – "My Calculator" (Zowie)	**Concord Dawn – Air Chrysalis**; Bulletproof – Dub Me Crazy; Six60 – Six60
Best Gospel / Christian Album†	Best Classical Album†
**Parachute Band – Matins:Vespers**; Rapture Ruckus – Open Your Eyes; The Ember Days – Emergency	Sponsored by KBB Music: **Christopher Blake – Angel at Ahipara**; Anthony Ritchie and the New Zealand Symphony Orchestra – A Bugle Will Do; Eve de Castro-Robinson – Releasing the Angel
Peoples' Choice Award†	Critics' Choice Prize†
Sponsored by Vodafone: **Six60**; Gin Wigmore; Kimbra; Home Brew; Stan Walker	**Watercolours**; Beach Pigs; Loui the ZU
Highest selling New Zealand Single†	Highest selling New Zealand Album†
Sponsored by Vodafone No finalists were announced in this category.: **Six60 – "Don't Forget Your Roots"**	No finalists were announced in this category.: **Six60 – Six60**
Radio Airplay Record of the Year†	International Achievement Award†
Sponsored by NZ On Air; No finalists were announced in this category.: **Six60 – "Don't Forget Your Roots"**	No finalists were announced in this category.: **The Naked and Famous**; **Kimbra**
Legacy Award†	Best Album Cover‡
Sponsored by New Zealand Herald; No finalists were announced in this category.: **Toy Love**	**Angela Keoghan for Dearly Departed (Bannerman)**
Best Engineer‡	Best Producer‡
Sponsored by MAINZ: **Neil Baldock for Me & Moon (Lydia Cole)**	Sponsored by MAINZ: **Kody Nielson for Belle (Bic Runga)**

== Presenters and performers ==
=== Performers ===
- Gin Wigmore performed "Man Like That"
- Annah Mac sang "Girl in Stilettos"
- Homebrew performed "Benefit"
- Members from Street Chant, Rackets and Tiny Ruins performed a tribute to Legacy Award winner Toy Love.
