= How Bizarre (album) =

Studio album by OMC
- Released: 27 November 1996
- Recorded: 1995–1996
- Genres: Electronic; rock; hip-hop; pop
- Length: 50:29
- Labels: Huh! PolyGram; Mercury
- Producer: Alan Jansson

Singles from How Bizarre
- 1. "How Bizarre" Released: 15 December 1995; 2. "Right On" Released: 1996; 3. "On the Run" Released: 18 January 1997; 4. "Land of Plenty" Released: 1997; 5. "Love L.A." Released: 1997

How Bizarre is the only studio album by the New Zealand musical group OMC, released in 1996. It was first released on 27 September under the Huh! record label, issued by PolyGram New Zealand, and manufactured and marketed by Mercury Records on 25 February 1997 in the United States. The album garnered a surprised, but generally positive reaction from critics; it was considered so bold and unique that it could not be compared to anything, and journalists struggled to classify it as one thing or another. How Bizarre reached number 5 in its native New Zealand and number 40 on the Billboard 200, spawning four singles: the title track, "Right On", "On the Run" and "Land of Plenty". It was also certified Gold by the Recording Industry Association of America (RIAA), denoting sales of over 500,000 copies in that country, becoming the best-selling Urban Pasifika album.

How Bizarre was reissued globally on vinyl for the first time on April 16, 2021, remastered by OMC band member and producer Alan Jansson.

== Critical reception ==
Professional ratings
Review scores
Source	Rating
AllMusic	2.5/5 stars
Christgau's Consumer Guide	(choice cut)
Mojo	4/5
Music Week	4/5 stars
Q	4/5
Spin	8/10

Critical reception was mixed to positive. Chuck Eddy, writing for Spin, praised the overall musicianship throughout the album, highlighting the update to the "angelic-melancholy-through-odd-instrumentation aesthetic" pioneered by Flying Nun Records, and Pauly Fuemana's vocal performance resembling that of Billy Ocean and R. B. Greaves. Eddy said OMC crafted a genre hybrid that mixes Beck from 1996, reggae from 1971 and recent pop music that "dour mid-'90s U.S. radio might not know what to do with it." Thom Owens of AllMusic called the record "an intriguing fusion of worldbeat rhythms and urban soul that never manages to catch fire, despite several strong grooves and soulful fusions." Robert Christgau cited the title track and "On the Run" as "choice cuts", indicating good songs on "an album that isn't worth your time or money.". Both Q and Mojo magazines gave the album four out of five stars and it was named Album of the Year by publications in Japan and the Philippines.

== Track listing ==
All tracks are written by Pauly Fuemana and Alan Jansson, except where noted.

No.	Title	Length
1.	"On the Run"	4:03
2.	"How Bizarre"	3:43
3.	"Never Coming Back"	4:02
4.	"Breaking My Heart"	5:18
5.	"Angel in Disguise"	3:54
6.	"Lingo with the Gringo"	5:51
7.	"Land of Plenty"	5:19
8.	"Right On"	4:50
9.	"Pours Out Your Eyes"	4:53
10.	"She Loves Italian"	4:31
11.	"I Love L.A." (Randy Newman)	4:07

- Track 11 was only on the second release of this album, issued in September 1997 in the US only.

== Personnel ==
Adapted from the album's liner notes.

OMC

- Pauly Fuemana – vocals, guitar
- Alan Jansson – engineering, keyboards, programming, guitar ("Right On")

Additional musicians

- Sina Saipaia – backing vocals ("How Bizarre", "Right On")
- Lee Baker – guitar ("How Bizarre", "Right On")
- Hershal Herscher – accordion ("How Bizarre")
- George Chisholm – trumpet ("How Bizarre", "Right On")
- Glenn Campbell – pedal steel guitar ("Right On"), dobro guitar ("Breaking My Heart")
- Geoffrey Heath – cello ("Pours Out Your Eyes")
- Steve Robinson – piano ("Pours Out Your Eyes"), hammond organ ("Land of Plenty")
- Steve Kellner – drums ("Pours Out Your Eyes", "She Loves Italian")
- Mia Camilleri – French horn ("Pours Out Your Eyes", "Land of Plenty")
- Walter Bianco – saxophone ("Breaking My Heart")
- Harmon – tea chest bass ("Breaking My Heart")
- Taisha – backing vocals ("Land of Plenty")
- Christine Fuemana – backing vocals ("Land of Plenty")
- James Gaylyn – drums ("Angel in Disguise")
- Juliet Primrose – violin ("Angel in Disguise")
- Manuel Bundy – scratching ("Lingo with the Gringo")

Production

- Rick Huntington – additional mixing and engineering

Artwork

- Deborah Smith – photography
- Richard Kingsford – design

== Charts ==
=== Weekly charts ===
Chart (1996–1997)	Peak position
German Albums (Offizielle Top 100)	48
Hungarian Albums (MAHASZ)	37
New Zealand Albums (RMNZ)	5
Swiss Albums (Schweizer Hitparade)	35
US Billboard 200	40

=== Year-end charts ===
Chart (1997)	Position
US Billboard 200	173

== Certifications ==
Region	Certification	Certified units/sales
Canada (Music Canada)	Platinum	100,000^{^}
New Zealand (RMNZ)	Gold	7,500^{^}
United States (RIAA)	Gold	500,000^{^}
^{^} Shipments figures based on certification alone.
