= Rough Opinion =

Samoan hip hop group

Rough Opinion, formerly known as The Mau, is a Samoan Hip hop group comprising MC’s Kosmo, “Khas the Fieldstyle Orator,” (now known as Tha Feelstyle) and DJ Rockit V. Created in 1990, in Wellington, New Zealand, the group first named themselves The Mau, as they took their name from the Samoan organization that agitated the country’s independence under both German and New Zealand colonial governments. The decision of the group members to invoke Samoan colonial history, even though the group name was Samoa-specific, demonstrates the clear influence of the United States on Samoan hip hop, in that “there was a movement of Black consciousness in America at the time, and this became fuel for through for Kosmo’s crew whose motto became that of the Mau movement in Samoa-Samoa Mo Samoa, Samoa for Samoans.”

Although as a group Rough Opinion never recorded an album, their influence on the hip hop scene was invaluable. By drawing alternately upon their knowledge of Samoan history and narrative of the U.S. Black Power movement circulating at the time within the American Hip Hop scene, the group articulated a diasporic Samoan cultural nationalism. It is said that “their potent blend of machete-waving Samoa-centricity, occasional Samoan language rhymes, and U.S. Black Power iconography in live performances were influential on acts that followed.”
