= Charlotte Ryan (broadcaster) =

New Zealand radio broadcaster and music journalist

Charlotte Ryan is a New Zealand radio broadcaster and music journalist.

== Biography ==
Ryan was born and grew up in Christchurch. She attended Villa Maria College and the University of Canterbury, where she studied education and sociology. While at university she volunteered at RDU, the university radio station. On graduating she worked at the station for a short time then moved to Auckland to work for the University of Auckland's radio station, bFM.

She has managed bands and artists such as Shapeshifter and Ladi6 and ran her own publicity business for a time. In 2008 she returned to bFM as a presenter on the daily morning show, Morning Glory, and in 2012 moved to Kiwi FM until it closed. Ryan then spent four years working for Neil Finn.

On television, Ryan was a co-host of Paul Henry (2015–16) and Back Benches (2017). She hosted Music 101, a weekly radio programme on Radio New Zealand from August 2019 until March 2025. Upon leaving the hosting role, she described it as having been an "absolute dream job" since she had been aged 15.
