= At Peace =

New Zealand hip hop group

- Origin: New Zealand
- Genres: Hip hop
- Years active: 2011–2015
- Labels: Young, Gifted & Broke
- Members: Lui Tuiasau, Tom Scott, Christoph El Truento, Dandruff Dicky, Brandon Haru
- Website: www.atpeace.co.nz

At Peace (stylised as @peace) was a New Zealand hip hop group. The group comprised lyricist and vocalist Tom Scott (also of the hip-hop group Home Brew and later Avantdale Bowling Club); lyricist and vocalist Lui Tuiasau, formerly of hip-hop duo Nothing To Nobody; and producers Christoph El Truento, Dandruff Dicky and B Haru.

At Peace released three albums between 2012 and 2014 before the group's breakup in 2015. All three were shortlisted for the Taite Music Prize in consecutive years from 2013–2015.

In 2014 they released a song which included lyrics threatening to kill John Key and have sex with his daughter. In 2018 Scott said "I was wrong. I could’ve definitely done that better.”

== Discography ==
Studio albums

- @Peace (2012) No. 11 NZ
- Girl Songs (2013) No. 12 NZ
- @Peace and the Plutonian Noise Symphony (2014) No. 3 NZ

Other appearances

Song	Year	Artist	Album
"Finding God"	2013	P-Money	Gratitude (P-Money album)
