= King Kapisi =

Bill Urale MNZM
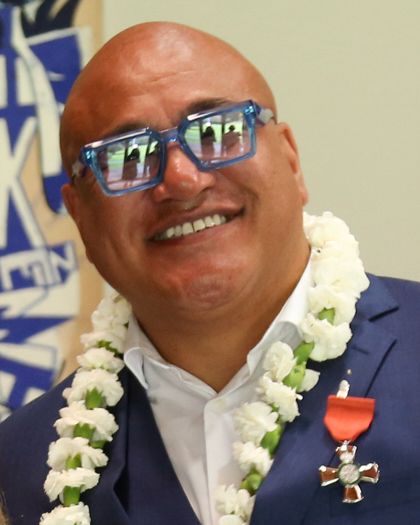
- Urale in 2024

Background information
- Born: Bill Rangi Urale; 1974 (age 51–52); Wellington, New Zealand
- Origin: Wellington, New Zealand
- Genres: Rap, reggae, roots, soul, funk
- Occupations: Rapper, DJ, producer, clothing designer, screenprinter, music video director, television presenter
- Instruments: Vocals, turntables, keyboards, bass, guitar, drums
- Years active: 1997–present
- Labels: Festival Mushroom Records; Quabax Wax

King Kapisi (Bill Urale) performing "Raise Up".

Bill Rangi Urale MNZM (born 1974), known by his stage name King Kapisi, is a New Zealand hip hop recording artist. He was the first hip hop artist in New Zealand to receive the Silver Scroll Award at the APRA Awards for Songwriter of the Year for his single Reverse Resistance in 1999.

== Career ==
King Kapisi signed as an artist with Festival Mushroom Records (NZ). In 2000 he released his critically acclaimed debut album Savage Thoughts, followed by a second album, 2nd Round Testament, released in New Zealand and Australia in 2003. Local sales for both albums hit the gold status mark. King Kapisi also achieved gold with his single U Can't Resist Us, featuring New Zealand hip hop icon Che Fu in 2003.

== International acts ==
King Kapisi has performed alongside Afrika Bambaata, Janet Jackson, Moby, The Black Eyed Peas, Beastie Boys, Michael Franti and Spearhead, Red Hot Chili Peppers and many more. He has performed at almost every major music festival and event in New Zealand as well as tours to Australia, Japan, Fiji, Hawaii, Tonga, New York City, London, Toronto, Germany, Ireland, France and Norway.

In 2003, King Kapisi represented New Zealand at the Central Park birthday celebrations in New York City where he was also invited to play at the first old school hip hop reunion in Crotona Park, South Bronx. He played alongside legends such as The Furious Five, Cold Crush Brothers, Jazzy Jay and The Rocksteady Crew. King Kapisi was also given the opportunity to record a track with the legendary Kay Gee from the Cold Crush Brothers. The European leg of his 2003 overseas trip saw him perform a showcase at the international music conference POPKOMM in Cologne, Germany. He also spent time in Kaiserslautern, Germany recording with Germany-based American producer, Smitty K.

In 2004, Kapisi was invited by the German government as part of its new initiative scheme to promote cultural exchanges between New Zealand and Germany. Having supported German rap star MC Clueso in a New Zealand tour, Kapisi headed back to Germany to attend the POPKOMM music conference for a second time with Goethe-Institute playing host. Kapisi had the opportunity to record two tracks with German music producers Trickski and Slope from the Sonar Kollectiv record company. Kapisi also produced tracks for various local hip hop artists in Berlin, Amsterdam, Dublin, Toronto and Sydney.

== Lyrics ==
King Kapisi's music and lyrics raise issues relevant to Pacific Island people living in New Zealand. He often challenges the role of Christianity and the church in contemporary Samoan society which is deeply devout. King Kapisi believes his music to be deeply connected to the culture of the Pacific people.

King Kapisi attempts to keep his music "real" by rapping about his Pacific heritage and the hip hop scene. He uses hip hop to promote the message of "keeping it real" through your culture, learning your language, and knowing "where you are from." Kapisi's lyrics and imagery have explored his complex post-Diaspora Pacific immigrant identity. He is a prime example of how New Zealand MC's are able to rap about their Diasporic identity in the text of their rap lyrics. Kapisi is now reaching out to the bigger global market. The transfer of Samoan hip hop identity to the US is something that already exists with artists who have settled and embraced their cultural heritage.

== Samoa ==
King Kapisi is from Samoa and New Zealand. His extended family is from the island of Savaii. His family are from the villages of Fagamalo, Matavai & Faletagaloa, Falealupo and Safaatoa in Lefaga district.

== Overstayer Label ==
In 2002, he started his own urban streetwear clothing label Overstayer Clothing. The name Overstayer refers to the infamous Dawn Raid era during the 1970s in New Zealand, when Pacific Islander overstayers were the prime target by the government using controversial means, even though the highest number of overstayers in the country at the time were Europeans. In 2003 and 2004, King Kapisi was awarded the Westfield Style Pasifika Designer Award giving the hip hop artist the opportunity to showcase his street label in the coveted international annual Air New Zealand Fashion Week in 2003. Overstayer Clothing was the first local street label to be sold in Farmers in New Zealand. The label is now available through selected outlets and his web store, The Plantation Store.

== Discography ==
=== Albums ===
Year	Title	Details	Peak chart positions
Year	Title	Details	NZ
2000	Savage Thoughts	Released: 29 November 2000; Label: FMR; Catalogue: D 32110; Features: Overstayers from Kua (DJ Raw, Tha Feelstyle), Teremoana Rapley	9
2003	2nd Round Testament	Released: 5 June 2003; Label: FMR; Catalogue: 336412; Features: Che Fu, Spikey Tee	11
2005	Dominant Species	Released: 10 October 2005; Label: Warner Music; Catalogue: 338765; Features: Savage, Adeaze, Scribe, Open Thought, Ben Makisi	—
"—" denotes releases that did not chart or were not released in that country.

=== EPs ===
Year	Title	Details	Peak chart positions
Year	Title	Details	NZ
2011	Salvation	Released: 27 February 2011; Label: Quabax Wax; Features: The Mint Chicks, Luciano	9
"—" denotes releases that did not chart or were not released in that country.

=== Singles ===
Year	Title	Peak chart positions	Album
Year	Title	NZ	Album
1998	"Vertikal Sequels"	—	Non-album single
1998	"Sub-Cranium Feeling"	8	Non-album single
1999	"Reverse Resistance"	21	Savage Thoughts
2000	"Screams from da Old Plantation"	—	Savage Thoughts
2000	"2nd Migration"	45	Savage Thoughts
2001	"Saboteur"	—	Savage Thoughts
2003	"U Can't Resist Us" feat. Che Fu	9	2nd Round Testament
2003	"Stomping"	—	2nd Round Testament
2003	"Conversate"	—	2nd Round Testament
2003	"Elemental Forces"	—	2nd Round Testament
2005	"Raise Up"	18	Dominant Species
2005	"Lollipop"	—	Dominant Species
2009	"Hip Hop 4 Life"	—	Non-album single
2009	"Stand" feat. Luciano	—	Non-album single
2010	"Safari" feat. Dr Richard Nunns	—	Non-album single
2010	"Superhuman" feat. The Mint Chicks	—	Non-album single
2011	"Salvation"	—	Salvation EP
2011	"Clap Ya Hands"	—	Non-album single
2011	"Won't Stop, Can't Stop" feat. Teremoana Rapley	—	Non-album single
"—" denotes releases that did not chart or were not released in that country.

== Honours and awards ==
Year	Nominee / work	Award	Result
1999	King Kapisi	NZ Music Awards: Most Promising Male Vocalist	Nominated
1999	"Sub Cranium Feeling"	NZ Music Awards: Best Music Video	Nominated
1999	King Kapisi	bNet Music Awards: Male Fox	Won
1999	"Reverse Resistance"	APRA Silver Scroll	Won
2000	"Reverse Resistance"	bNet Music Awards: Best hip hop/reggae/dub release	Won
2000	"Reverse Resistance"	bNet Music Awards: Best song	Won
2001	Savage Thoughts	bNet Music Awards: Best Cover Art	Won
2001	"Screems from da Old Plantation"	bNet Music Awards: Best Music Video	Won
2001	King Kapisi	bNet Music Awards: Best Live Act	Won
2001	Savage Thoughts	bNet Music Awards: Best Hip Hop Release	Won
2001	"Screems from da Old Plantation"	bNet Music Awards: Best Song	Won
2001	Savage Thoughts	bNet Music Awards: Best Album	Nominated
2004	2nd Round Testament	NZ Music Awards: Best Urban/Hip Hop Album	Nominated
2006	Dominant Species	Pacific Music Awards: Best Pacific Male Artist	Nominated
2006	Dominant Species	Pacific Music Awards: Best Pacific Urban Artist	Nominated
2014	"Crush"	Pacific Music Awards: Best Pacific Music Video	Won
2014	"Crush"	Pacific Music Awards: Best Pacific Urban Artist	Nominated
2015	"Welcome Back"	Pacific Music Awards: Best Pacific Male Artist	Nominated

In the 2022 Queen's Birthday and Platinum Jubilee Honours, Urale was appointed a Member of the New Zealand Order of Merit, for services to music and the community.
