= OMC (band) =

New Zealand music group

- Also known as: Otara Millionaires Club
- Origin: Ōtara, Auckland, New Zealand
- Genres: Pop-rap; acoustic rock; Latin
- Years active: 1992–1998; 2005–2010
- Labels: Huh!; PolyGram; Mercury
- Past members: Phil Fuemana († 2005); Pauly Fuemana († 2010); Alan Jansson; Herman Loto († 2023); Paul Ave

OMC, or Otara Millionaires Club, were a New Zealand music group, then duo, with vocalist Pauly Fuemana later becoming the sole member. OMC was best known for the 1996 hit "How Bizarre", named one of the greatest New Zealander songs of all time by the Australasian Performing Right Association. The full name of the band is a tongue-in-cheek reference to Ōtara's status as one of the poorest suburbs of Auckland.

== Career ==
=== Origin (1992–1995) ===
The Otara Millionaires Club was formed in 1992 by Phil Fuemana, who had played in the bands Houseparty and Fuemana. Fuemana and his younger brother Pauly Fuemana recorded two tracks as the new band for producer Alan Jansson's Urban Pacifica collection Proud: An Urban-Pacific Streetsoul Compilation. Jansson had achieved cult status as composer/producer for the synthpop group Body Electric during the early 1980s. In 1994, after the split of the Otara Millionaires Club, Pauly approached Jansson and the two formed a musical partnership, with Fuemana the public face and Jansson as producer and co-writer. Pauly suggested that they shorten the band's name to just the initials, and thereafter, Fuemana and Jansson were OMC. Pauly performed as OMC, serving as the frontman and playing several instruments during performances. However, the music was created by Pauly and Alan Jansson, with Jansson co-writing all of the tracks and handling most of the arrangement and all production duties in the studio.

=== How Bizarre (1995–1997) ===
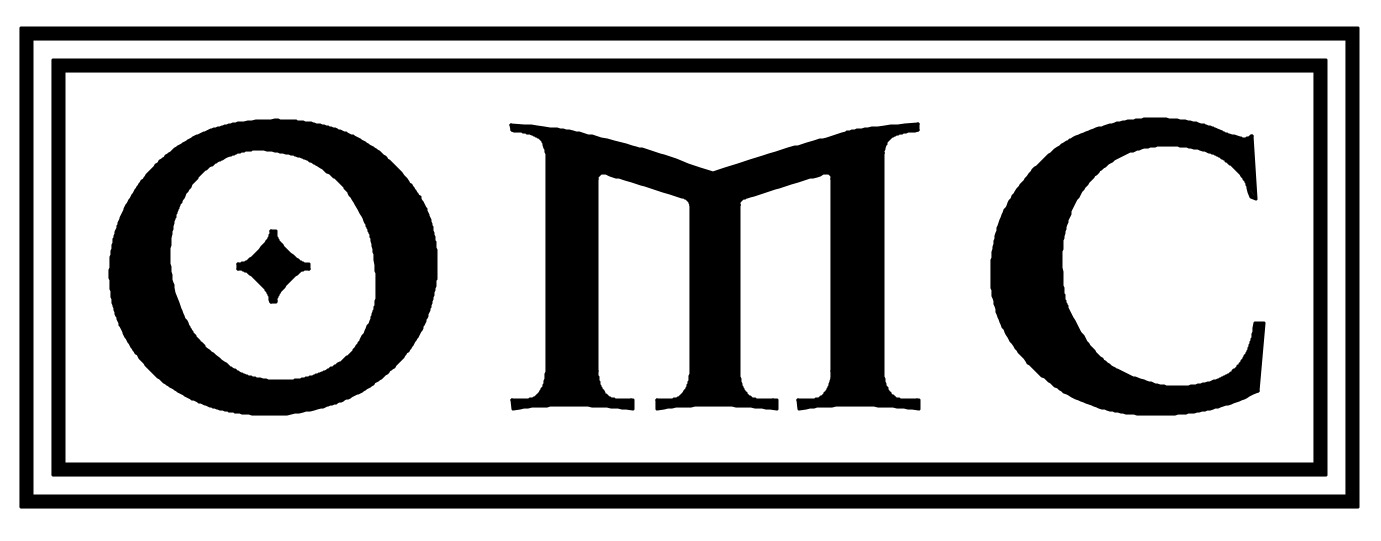
Logo used on "How Bizarre" single release

Signed to Simon Grigg's Huh! label, OMC released the single "How Bizarre" in New Zealand in late 1995. It was an immediate smash hit even without a video, reaching number one in early 1996 and staying there for three weeks. It sold over 35,000 copies. The track prominently features vocalist, rapper and ragga girl Sina Saipaia – credited on the album as "Zina" – whose sung hook and backing vocals form a central part of the recording. Sina toured with the band in 1995, and appeared in the song's video.

The same year, "How Bizarre" went to number one in Australia for five weeks, sold over 150,000 singles, and was certified as a platinum single. Later in the year the single went to number 5 in the UK Singles Chart and number one in countries across Europe and much of the rest of the world.

In the United States, "How Bizarre" spent 32 weeks on Billboard's Mainstream Top 40 chart, peaking at number one in August 1997 due to the large amount of radio play it received. This made OMC the first New Zealand artist to reach the number one spot on a Billboard chart. The song never charted on the regular Billboard Hot 100 as it was not released as a commercially available single in the US, which was a chart-eligibility requirement at the time. It also became a BMI-certified "million airplay" song two years in a row.

OMC's third single, "On the Run", reached number 56 on the UK in 1997.

In 1996, OMC's debut album of the eponymous single, was released. The album sold in excess of half a million copies in the United States, and charted worldwide. Between 1995 and 2000, world-wide OMC sales are estimated at between three and four million records.

=== Follow-up success (1997–2010) ===
"How Bizarre" was followed by the singles "Land of Plenty" which reached the top 5 in the New Zealand charts; "Right On" which achieved platinum-status in New Zealand; and "On The Run" which was a minor international hit in the Netherlands and the UK. By 1998, Fuemana and Jansson had a falling out over royalties, which ended up in court. It was resolved in arbitration with Fuemana paying a sum to Jansson and Jansson handing over all claim to the name and ongoing artist royalties.

Fuemana and Jansson regrouped in 2005 and released the single "4 All of Us", featuring the actress Lucy Lawless as a guest vocalist, in 2007.

In 2002, their song "How Bizarre" reached #71 on the 100 Greatest One-hit Wonders hosted by William Shatner.

=== Deaths of Pauly and Phil ===
Phil died on 28 February 2005, of a heart attack.

On 31 January 2010, Pauly Fuemana died at North Shore Hospital in Auckland after suffering for several years from a chronic degenerative disease, progressive demyelinating polyneuropathy, an auto-immune disorder similar to the nerve disease multiple sclerosis. He was 40 years old, and was survived by his wife and six children. In February 2010, "How Bizarre" briefly reentered the charts in New Zealand following news of Pauly Fuemana's death.

== Discography ==
=== Albums ===
List of studio albums, with selected chart positions and certifications.
Title	Details	Peak chart positions				Certifications (sales threshold)
Title	Details	NZ	CAN	SWI	US	Certifications (sales threshold)
How Bizarre	Released: 27 September 1996; Label: huh!; Catalogue: HUH6; Formats: CD, cassette	5	44	35	40	RMNZ: Gold; MC: Platinum; RIAA: Gold

=== Singles ===
List of singles, with selected chart positions and certifications, showing year released and originating album.
Title	Year	Peak chart positions										Certifications (sales threshold)	Album
Title	Year	NZ	AUS	AUT	BEL (Fl)	GER	NLD	SWE	SWI	UK	US Radio	Certifications (sales threshold)	Album
"We R the OMC" (as Otara Millionaires Club)	1994	—	—	—	—	—	—	—	—	—	—		Proud: An Urban-Pacific Streetsoul Compilation
"How Bizarre"	1995	1	1	1	14	2	11	4	4	5	4	RMNZ: 3× Platinum; ARIA: Platinum; BPI: Platinum; BVMI: Gold	How Bizarre
"Right On"	1996	11	88	—	—	83	—	—	—	—	—	RMNZ: Gold	How Bizarre
"On the Run"	1997	30	—	—	57	82	98	—	—	56	—		How Bizarre
"Land of Plenty"	1997	4	—	—	—	—	—	—	—	—	—		How Bizarre
"Love L.A."	1997	—	—	—	—	—	—	—	—	—	—		How Bizarre
"4 All of Us"	2007	—	—	—	—	—	—	—	—	—	—		Non-album single
"—" denotes a recording that did not chart or was not released in that territory.

=== Music videos ===
List of music videos, showing year released and directors.
Title	Year	Director
"How Bizarre"	1995	Lee Baker
"Right On"	1996	Rob Mclaughlin
"On the Run"	1997	Mark Hartley
"Land of Plenty"	1997	Kerry Brown
"Love L.A."	1997	Evan Bernard
"4 All of Us"	2007	

== Awards ==
=== New Zealand Music Awards ===
The New Zealand Music Awards are an annual awards night celebrating excellence in New Zealand music and have been presented annually since 1965.

Year	Nominee / work	Award	Result	Ref.
1996	OMC	Most Promising Group	Won	
1996	Paul Fuemana (OMC)	Most Promising Male	Won	
1996	"How Bizarre"	Single of the Year	Won	
1996	Alan Jansson for "How Bizarre" (OMC)	Engineer of the Year	Won	
1997	How Bizarre	Album of the Year	Nominated	
1997	Rick Huntington & Alan Jansson for How Bizarre by OMC	Album Cover of the Year	Nominated	
1997	Rick Huntington & Alan Jansson for How Bizarre by OMC	Engineer of the Year	Nominated	
1997	Alan Jansson for How Bizarre by OMC	Producer of the Year	Nominated	
1997	OMC	International Achievement	Won	
1998	OMC	International Achievement	Won	
