= Home Brew (band) =

New Zealand hip hop band

Home Brew Crew
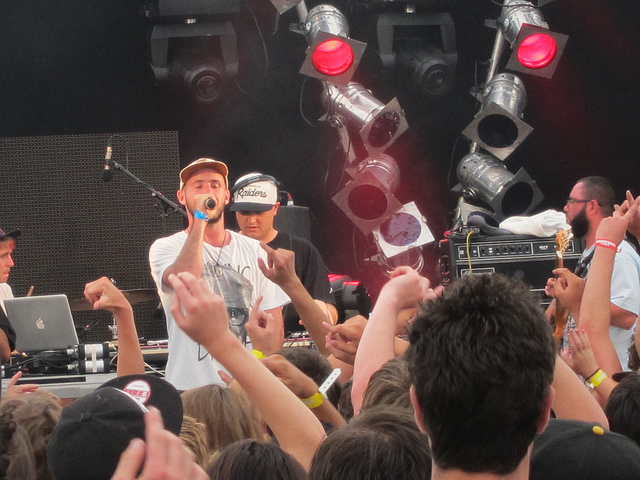
- Home Brew at Homegrown, Wellington 2012

Background information
- Origin: West Auckland, New Zealand
- Genre: Conscious Rap
- Instruments: Singing
- Years active: 2006–2018; 2023–present
- Labels: Young, Gifted & Broke
- Members: Tom Scott; Lui Gumaka; Harry "Haz Beats" Huavi

Home Brew, also known as Home Brew Crew, is a New Zealand hip hop group.

They released their self-titled debut full-length album in May 2012 to some critical acclaim. It hit number 1 on the New Zealand album charts in its first week, and is the first New Zealand hip hop album to top the charts since Scribe's album The Crusader in 2003.

In 2010 Home Brew were shortlisted for the New Zealand Music Awards Critics Choice Prize. In 2012 they won Best Urban / Hip Hop Album at the New Zealand Music Awards and were nominated for four others, including Best Group and Album of the Year. Their debut album was shortlisted for the 2013 Taite Music Prize.

One of their promotional videos, 'Police Stop Seven', has been criticised for condoning drunk-driving. In 2010 they also played at the Big Day Out.

In 2012, Massive Magazine wrote:

Their fun and often satirical take on hip-hop is no less pure or cultured because of that, and the well-rehearsed flows and crafted beats are the result of hours of hard work. This fact also makes them an impressive live outfit, and this reputation has seen them steadily become more in demand throughout New Zealand.

In 2014, one of the band's performances at Lincoln University in Christchurch was shut down after one of its members allegedly punched an audience member in the face.

In 2023, Home Brew released an 11th-anniversary re-issue of their self-titled debut on vinyl and CD. On 27 October 2023, Home Brew announced their sophomore album, Run It Back. It was subsequently released on 8 December 2023 and went on to earn a place in the 2024 Taite Music Prize final.

== Discography ==
=== Studio albums ===
List of studio albums, with selected details and chart positions
Year	Title	Details	Peak chart positions
Year	Title	Details	NZ
2012	Home Brew	Released: 1 May 2012; Format: CD, digital download; Label: Young, Gifted & Broke	1
2023	Run It Back	Released: 8 December 2023; Format: LP, digital download; Label: Years Gone By	1

=== Extended plays ===
List of EPs, with selected details
Year	Title	Details
2006	Vintage EP	Released: 1 May 2006
2007	Home Brew Light EP	Released: 6 June 2007; Format: Digital download; Label: Home Brew
2008	Last Week EP	Released: 6 October 2008; Format: 12" vinyl, digital download; Label: Home Brew
2009	Summer Ale EP	Released: 16 March 2009; Format: Digital download; Label: Homebrew
2009	Taste Test EP	Released: 4 June 2009; Format: Digital download; Label: Home Brew

== Awards ==
Year	Nominee / work	Award	Result
2010	Home Brew	Critics' Choice Prize – NZ Music Awards	Nominated
2012	Home Brew	Album of the Year – NZ Music Awards	Nominated
2012	Home Brew	Best Group – NZ Music Awards	Nominated
2012	Home Brew	Breakthrough Artist of The Year – NZ Music Awards	Nominated
2012	Home Brew	Best Urban / Hip Hop Album – NZ Music Awards	Won
2012	Home Brew	People's Choice Award – NZ Music Awards	Nominated
2013	Home Brew	Taite Music Prize	Nominated
2024	Run It Back	Taite Music Prize	Nominated
