= How Bizarre =

1995 single by OMC

Single by OMC

from the album How Bizarre
- Released: 15 December 1995
- Genre: Pop; hip-hop
- Length: 3:43
- Label: Huh!; Polydor
- Songwriters: Alan Jansson; Pauly Fuemana
- Producers: Alan Jansson; Pauly Fuemana

OMC singles chronology
"We R the OMC" (1994)	"How Bizarre" (1995)	"Right On" (1996)

Music video
- "How Bizarre" on YouTube

"How Bizarre" is a song written and performed by New Zealand musical group OMC. It was released in December 1995 by Huh! and Polydor Records as the lead single from their only album, How Bizarre (1996). It was both written and produced by lead singer of OMC, Pauly Fuemana with Alan Jansson, and went on to top the charts of five countries: Australia, Austria, Canada, Ireland and New Zealand. In the United States, the song peaked at number four on the Billboard Hot 100 Airplay chart. Lee Baker directed its accompanying music video featuring the group in a Chevrolet Impala.

"How Bizarre" won the award for "Single of the Year" at the 1996 New Zealand Music Awards. Outside New Zealand, OMC is generally considered a one-hit wonder; they had a further few successful singles in New Zealand, including "On the Run" and "Land of Plenty". In 2017, Billboard magazine ranked "How Bizarre" among "The 100 Greatest Pop Songs of 1997".

== Critical reception ==
Upon the song's release, Ross Jones of The Guardian called the song "supernaturally summery", noting that it "combines a proto-electro beat, a funky Mariachi guitar, Tex-Mex trumpets, girly close harmonies, and a goofy rap". Pan-European magazine Music & Media wrote, "Polynesian pop with a twist. Pauly Fuemana has a gravelly, deep voice and a major rap attitude. The Spanish guitar, trumpet and the sweet female background vocals create a radio friendly mood. This single from the forthcoming album Time Is Money smashed New Zealand and Australian sales figures; OMC's quirky catchiness should kick up some dust in Europe too." British trade paper Music Week rated it four out of five, adding: "A smash in Australia and NZ, this mix of male vocals with Spanish guitar and a samba/dance beat could be a surprise hit if radio latches on."

== Chart performance ==
"How Bizarre" topped the singles charts in New Zealand, Australia, Austria, Canada and Ireland. The single was number one for one week in Canada, two weeks in Austria, three weeks in Ireland, three weeks in New Zealand and five weeks in Australia. As the track was only released to radio in the United States, the song was not allowed to chart on the Billboard Hot 100 under the chart rules in place at the time. However, it topped the Billboard Pop Airplay chart for a week and peaked at number four on the Hot 100 Airplay chart. On 9 February 2010, the song re-entered the New Zealand charts at number 40 after Fuemana's death.

== Music video ==
A music video was released to help promote the single. The video features lead singer Pauly Fuemana driving a 1968 Chevrolet Impala, dancing, rapping, throwing around money and breathing fire. The video was directed by Lee Baker and released in late 1995, shortly before "How Bizarre" hit number one in New Zealand. Shot on a soundstage in Ponsonby, Auckland and Ellerslie Racecourse with a budget of $7,000 from NZ On Air, it was shown on US networks about 15,000 times in 1997 and 1998. Besides Fuemana, it also features backing vocalist Sina Saipaia, and Gil Manaois who stood in for Brother Pele.

== Legacy ==
"How Bizarre" won the award for "Single of the Year" at the 1996 New Zealand Music Awards. It was also featured on Nature's Best 2, as the 34th-greatest New Zealand song of all time as voted for by members of the Australasian Performing Right Association in 2001. In 2002, the song was named as the 71st-greatest one-hit wonder of all time on a VH1 countdown hosted by William Shatner. In 2017, Billboard magazine ranked "How Bizarre" number 19 in their list of "The 100 Greatest Pop Songs of 1997", naming it "a fantastical Latin-tinged story song bearing a handful of absolutely dynamite hooks".

== Track listings ==
- Australasian and UK CD single
1. "How Bizarre" (radio mix) – 3:49
2. "How Bizarre" (album mix) – 3:49
3. "How Bizarre" (instrumental) – 3:49
4. "How Bizarre" (dance mix) – 6:00
- Australasian cassette single
1. "How Bizarre" (radio mix)
2. "How Bizarre" (album mix)
3. "How Bizarre" (instrumental)
- UK 12-inch single

A. "How Bizarre" (Sharp Raided mix) – 7:50
B. "How Bizarre" (Flexifinger "In My Face" mix) – 8:18

- UK cassette single and European CD single
1. "How Bizarre" (radio mix) – 3:49
2. "How Bizarre" (dance mix) – 6:00
- Japanese CD single
1. "How Bizarre" (radio mix)
2. "How Bizarre" (album mix)
3. "How Bizarre" (instrumental)
4. "How Bizarre" (dance mix)
5. "How Bizarre" (acoustic mix)

== Charts ==
=== Weekly charts ===
Chart (1996–1997)	Peak position
Australia (ARIA)	1
Austria (Ö3 Austria Top 40)	1
Belgium (Ultratop 50 Flanders)	14
Belgium (Ultratop 50 Wallonia)	32
Canada Top Singles (RPM)	1
Canada Adult Contemporary (RPM)	36
Denmark (IFPI)	11
Europe (Eurochart Hot 100)	5
France (SNEP)	16
Germany (GfK)	2
Hungary (Mahasz)	10
Ireland (IRMA)	1
Israel (Israeli Singles Chart)	17
Netherlands (Dutch Top 40)	11
Netherlands (Single Top 100)	11
New Zealand (Recorded Music NZ)	1
Norway (VG-lista)	11
Scottish Singles Sales (Official Charts)	5
Sweden (Sverigetopplistan)	4
Switzerland (Schweizer Hitparade)	4
UK Singles (Official Charts)	5
UK Pop Tip Club Chart (Music Week)	2
US Hot 100 Airplay (Billboard)	4
US Adult Top 40 (Billboard)	5
US Rhythmic Top 40 (Billboard)	20
US Top 40/Mainstream (Billboard)	1

Chart (2010)	Peak position
New Zealand (Recorded Music NZ)	40

=== Year-end charts ===
Chart (1996)	Position
Australia (ARIA)	4
Austria (Ö3 Austria Top 40)	18
Belgium (Ultratop 50 Flanders)	87
Canada Top Singles (RPM)	82
Europe (Eurochart Hot 100)	33
Europe Airplay (European Hit Radio)	20
Germany (Media Control)	27
Netherlands (Dutch Top 40)	94
Netherlands (Single Top 100)	89
New Zealand (RIANZ)	5
Sweden (Topplistan)	53
Switzerland (Schweizer Hitparade)	42
UK Singles (OCC)	37
UK Airplay (Music Week)	18

Chart (1997)	Position
Canada Top Singles (RPM)	41
France (SNEP)	96
US Hot 100 Airplay (Billboard)	11
US Adult Top 40 (Billboard)	13
US Rhythmic Top 40 (Billboard)	82
US Top 40/Mainstream (Billboard)	5

== Certifications ==
Region	Certification	Certified units/sales
Australia (ARIA)	Platinum	70,000^{^}
Germany (BVMI)	Gold	250,000^{^}
New Zealand (RMNZ)	3× Platinum	90,000^{‡}
United Kingdom (BPI)	Platinum	600,000^{‡}
^{^} Shipments figures based on certification alone.^{‡} Sales+streaming figures based on certification alone.

== Release history ==
Region	Date	Format(s)	Label(s)	Ref.
New Zealand	15 December 1995	CD	Huh!; Polydor	
United Kingdom	1 July 1996	12-inch vinyl; CD	Huh!; Polydor	
Japan	2 December 1996	CD	Huh!; Polydor	
United States	20 January 1997	Alternative radio	Huh!; Mercury	
United States	25 February 1997	Mainstream radio	Huh!; Mercury	

== Covers and parodies ==
In 1996, radio personality Dean Young created a parody of the song called "Stole My Car". Dean was working with RNZ-owned Rock 99, formerly based in Rotorua on 99.1 FM.

In 2003, the radio stadion ZM and Iain Stables released a compilation album of some of the parodies that were created in the radio company called Stables Label Volume 3. The album name was a parody itself as there was no Volume 1 or 2. The song "Stole My Car" was the eighth track on the album.

== In popular culture ==
The song became the anthem of the English 1997 FA Women's Cup Final-winning Millwall Lionesses soccer team. "How Bizarre" was included in the 1998 movies Palmetto and Disney's The Parent Trap and plays at the start of the first episode of the second season of American sitcom Clueless. It is also used in the third-season episode, "Coming Home", of the American alternate history television series For All Mankind. The song was also used in the 2023 Christmas television campaign for UK supermarket chain Tesco.

The music video for New Zealand band Six60's "All She Wrote" (2021) was shot as a tribute to "How Bizarre".

== Recent popularity ==
In the months leading up to March 2021, there was a resurgence of the song's popularity secondary to its adoption by many users of TikTok. Over 100,000 videos have incorporated the song's lyrics in videos showing awkward conversations and strange coincidences. The #HowBizarre hashtag has generated more than 1.4 billion views.
