= Jane Dodd =

New Zealand musician and contemporary jeweller (born 1962)

- Born: 1962 (age 63–64); New Zealand
- Occupations: Musician, librarian, jeweller
- Instrument: Bass
- Years active: 1980–present
- Label: Flying Nun Records
- Website: janedodd.co.nz

Jane Dodd (born 1962) is a New Zealand musician and contemporary jeweller. She is well known for her role as a bass player in early Dunedin-based Flying Nun Records groups The Chills and The Verlaines, was a long-standing member of Auckland group Able Tasmans, and occasionally played with side-project The Lure of Shoes.

Dodd is also responsible for the design or cover artwork for The Verlaines 7" single Death and the Maiden, their EP 10 O'Clock in the Afternoon (1984), The Verlaines 12" single Doomsday b/w New Kinda Hero and LP & CD, Juvenilia (both 1986), Able Tasmans LP & CD Hey Spinner! (1990), and Able Tasman CD Shape of Dolls (1993). She contributes backing vocals to the songs "Anchor Me" and "Queen's English" on The Mutton Birds album Salty (1993).

== Education ==
From 1982 to 1984 she studied for a Bachelor of Arts at the University of Otago, majoring in Phenomenology of Religion with additional papers in Anthropology, History, Art History, Maori Language and Philosophy.

== The Chills ==
Dodd was a founding member of Martin Phillips' group The Chills, alongside his sister Rachel Phillips (keyboards), Peter Gutteridge (guitar) and Alan Haig (drums). Dodd had also been a member of Phillips' earlier group, The Same, which had also included future The Verlaines co-founder Craig Easton. She left to travel in Europe and was replaced by Terry Moore, who recorded with The Chills for the Dunedin Double EP. Dodd and fellow original members performed in 2010 in Dunedin for The Chills' 30th anniversary.

== The Verlaines ==
Although not a founding member, Dodd returned from London in time to join The Verlaines for their first recordings on the Dunedin Double EP, which also debuted several other key groups for Flying Nun Records – The Chills, Sneaky Feelings and The Stones. One of the songs contributed to this release, "You Cheat Yourself of Everything that Moves", was later covered by American group Superchunk. The Ten O'Clock in the Afternoon EP followed, featuring their best-known song, "Death and the Maiden", securing a fanbase that includes Sonic Youth, Yo La Tengo and Pavement. ("Death and the Maiden" was covered by Stephen Malkmus for the Flying Nun Records compilation, Under the Influence – 21 Years of Flying Nun Records, and also by Elemeno P and Prickly.) Dodd also appears on the albums Hallelujah All the Way Home (1985) and Bird Dog (1987), the latter which also features her brother Tim Dodd playing piano and bassoon.

== Able Tasmans ==
Dodd joined Able Tasmans before the recording of their second album Hey Spinner (1990). She remained with them until they split up in 1996, having released a further two albums and an EP, collected on the compilation Songs from the Departure Lounge (1998). For the Flying Nun Records 10th anniversary compilation, Roger Sings the Hits (1991), Able Tasmans contributed the song "Getting Older" by The Clean, who The Chills (with Dodd) supported at their first concert.

== Jewellery ==
Dodd is also a jeweller. Her transition from music to jewellery took place after a 1989 trip to Mexico. In a 2015 interview Dodd recalled

There I was exposed to and excited by that culture’s ubiquitous interaction with craft and aesthetics—an approach I realized was largely lacking in New Zealand. I returned determined to engage in the arts and applied to go to craft school. Originally I intended to study ceramics, but the very lively and productive jewelry department soon won me over.

In 1994 Dodd completed a four-year diploma in 3D Design majoring in Jewellery at Unitec, where she studied with Pauline Bern and other tutors. She then joined the all-female jewellery collective Workshop 6, which coincided with the break-up of Able Tasmans. She remained in Auckland with Workshop 6 for 15 years before moving back to Dunedin in 2009. In Dunedin she shares studio space with fellow New Zealand jeweller Octavia Cook.

She is well known for her miniaturised depictions in silver of New Zealand landscapes, which have occasionally been produced on commission to recreate a client's favourite scenery. Fairy tales are another source of inspiration. A recent body of work titled 'Rococo Revolution' features realistic and abstracted representations of animals made from wood, bone and precious stone, inspired by visiting European museums and palaces. Dodd writes:

Rococo Revolution… illustrates my discomfort with the way we hoover up wildlife and environment for our own frivolous ends. With these pendants I want to honor the simple, elegant forms of the animal world. The subject of the brooches is the battle between nature and culture. The collection of works pays homage to the crazy and rich craft traditions of the Rococo Age.

These works have also been inspired by Leuchterweibchens, Gothic German candelabra that often incorporate animal shapes and antlers.

She has exhibited throughout New Zealand and internationally, and is featured in the book 21st Century Jewellery: the best of the 500 series. In 2007, she participated in Objectspace gallery's series of workshops and exhibition, Small Wonders. Her collection of work 'Rococo Revolution' was shown at Objectspace in 2014 and at Velvet da Vinci gallery in San Francisco in 2015.

Dodd's work was featured in the television series Tales from Te Papa and is held in the collections of Museum of New Zealand Te Papa Tongarewa, Auckland War Memorial Museum, The Dowse, and the Hawkes Bay Museum, as well as many private collections. In 2007 and 2009 she won the Contemporary section of the Regal Castings Awards at the National Jewellery Showcase.
