= Kaleidoscope World (The Chills song) =

- Sleeve cover for the Chills' contribution to Dunedin Double

Song by The Chills

from the album Kaleidoscope World
- Written: 1982
- Released: June 1982
- Recorded: March 1982
- Studio: Likely Sydenham, Christchurch
- Genre: Dunedin sound; indie rock; alternative rock; art rock
- Length: 3:45
- Label: Flying Nun Records
- Songwriter(s): Martin Phillipps, Terry Moore, Alan Haig, Frazer Batts
- Producer(s): The Chills; Doug Hood; Chris Knox; Roger Shepherd

"Kaleidoscope World" is an early song by New Zealand band The Chills. It was first released in June 1982 as part of Dunedin Double, an early Flying Nun compilation EP featuring The Chills, as well as Sneaky Feelings, The Stones, and The Verlaines.

== Background and recording ==
"Kaleidoscope World" appeared as the first track on Dunedin Double, a seminal EP shared between four bands, which launched those bands' careers nationally and internationally (the other bands were Sneaky Feelings, The Verlaines, and The Stones). The track was recorded in Christchurch in March 1982, possibly in Toy Love bassist Paul Kean’s home in Longfellow Street in Sydenham, though Sneaky Feelings' Matthew Bannister recalls the recordings as having been done in a flat in Barbadoes Street.

While not strictly a single, and never released as such, Kaleidoscope World is regarded as an early Chills manifesto. Written by Chills frontman Martin Phillipps, "Kaleidoscope World" was, like many other early releases from the Flying Nun label, recorded in very lo-fi surroundings, on Chris Knox's four-track tape by Doug Hood in a room at Paul Kean's house. The line-up of the Chills that recorded the song consisted of Martin Phillipps (guitar/vocals), Alan Haig (guitar), Frazer Batts (keyboards) and Terry Moore (bass).

The song features a swirl of jingle-jangle guitar over a background bass pulse and quiet synth, and is a prototype and epitome of what came to be known as the "Dunedin sound". The EP, and "Kaleidoscope World" in particular, were the launching pad for Dunedin's acceptance as an important source of New Zealand music. As engineer Doug Hood said of the track: "It was the one that made you think, boy, there's really something special happening here."

== Music video ==
A music video was subsequently produced for the song. Directed by Peter James, it features the band performing in an attic with a bubble machine.

== Legacy ==
The song became the title track of The Chills' 1986 compilation Kaleidoscope World, which collated all the band's early single and EP releases.

The song's title was borrowed for a major 2021 exhibition of Flying Nun-related art and ephemera to commemorate the label's 40th anniversary, at Dunedin's Hocken Library.
