= Heavenly Pop Hits – The Best of The Chills =

Heavenly Pop Hits - The Best of The Chills

Greatest hits album by The Chills
- Released: 1994
- Label: Flying Nun Records

The Chills chronology
Soft Bomb (1992)	Heavenly Pop Hits - The Best of The Chills (1994)	Sunburnt (1996)

Professional ratings
Review scores
Source	Rating
AllMusic	4/5 stars
Pitchfork	8.6/10

Heavenly Pop Hits – The Best of The Chills is a greatest hits album by New Zealand group The Chills, released in 1994.

== Track listing ==
All songs written by Martin Phillipps.

1. "Heavenly Pop Hit"
2. "I Love My Leather Jacket"
3. "Doledrums"
4. "Double Summer"
5. "Oncoming Day"
6. "Rolling Moon"
7. "I'll Only See You Alone Again"
8. "Never Never Go"
9. "Wet Blanket"
10. "Pink Frost"
11. "Kaleidoscope World"
12. "Look for the Good in Others"
13. "House with a Hundred Rooms"
14. "Part Past Part Fiction"
15. "Male Monster from the Id"
16. "This is the Way"

Ice Picks (limited edition bonus disc)

1. "Oncoming Day ("Brave Words" Outtake)" 3:00
2. "Party in My Heart" 3:15
3. "Living in the Jungle" 1:22
4. "Big Dark Day" 3:41
5. "I Wish I Could Do Without You" 2:16
6. "Green Eyed Owl" 5:29
