= Snow Bound (The Chills album) =

Studio album by The Chills
- Released: 14 September 2018
- Recorded: February–April 2018
- Genres: Indie pop, indie rock
- Label: Fire Records
- Producer: Greg Haver

The Chills chronology
Silver Bullets (2015)	Snow Bound (2018)	Scatterbrain (2021)

Snow Bound is an album by New Zealand group The Chills, released in 2018. Their second album after a 19-year gap between studio recordings, it reached number 9 in the New Zealand charts. It was recorded in a number of studios in New Zealand over a space of three weeks.

Songwriter Martin Phillipps said, "I was initially was surprised when people said, 'What an upbeat kind of record'. And I thought, 'Wait until you read the lyrics'. There is that contrast between that upbeat sound and dealing with something more personal, going back to that "Leather Jacket" approach." Elsewhere, he described the album as, "hopefully a kind of Carole King Tapestry for aging punks".

== Critical reception ==
The Guardian said, "The opening track, is nearly as good as anything Phillipps has written. Snow Bound drips with his trademarks: the melancholy lyrics paired with joyous melodies; the surging, oddly maritime cast of the music; the interaction of guitar and organ; the open-heartedness of it all." Pitchfork claimed it was their, "most winning album since 1990’s Submarine Bells—brash, tensile, and enormously confident".

AllMusic called it, "a big pop statement, overflowing with singalong choruses, ringing guitars, rich arrangements, and Phillipps' typically trenchant observations. A perfect example of how to make a record that sounds as big as a stadium while still being driven by real emotion." Classic Rock, however, said it was, "Tasteful and eloquent, minus the killer tunes".

== Track listing ==
All songs written by Martin Phillipps.

1. "Bad Sugar"
2. "Time to Atone"
3. "The Greatest Guide"
4. "Scarred"
5. "Complex"
6. "Deep Belief"
7. "Lord of All I Survey"
8. "Snow Bound"
9. "Eazy Peazy"
10. "In Harmony"
