= Soft Bomb =

Studio album by the Chills
- Released: 30 June 1992
- Recorded: Late 1991-Early 1992
- Studios: Master Control (Burbank); strings on track 16 recorded February 7, 1992, at Capitol (Hollywood)
- Genres: Dunedin sound, jangle pop, indie pop
- Label: Slash
- Producer: Gavin MacKillop

The Chills chronology
Submarine Bells (1990)	Soft Bomb (1992)	Heavenly Pop Hits – The Best of the Chills (1994)

Soft Bomb is an album by New Zealand group the Chills, released in 1992. It was the follow-up to Submarine Bells, which had hit number 1 in New Zealand in 1990.

Released to good reviews, Soft Bomb was followed by a world tour with an enlarged Chills line-up. In the midst of their US tour, financial backing and promotion was withdrawn for the album and tour. This line-up of the band disintegrated and Martin Phillipps would take some time to rebuild the band. Phillipps parted company with Slash Records after this album and tour.

== Background and production ==
The Chills released their second studio album Submarine Bells in 1990; it was well-received in Europe and was popular around colleges in the United States. Upon returning to their home country of New Zealand, the band went on a sold-out tour. Following this, keyboardist Andrew Todd and bassist Justin Harwood left, and Terry Moore, who had played with them in the early 1980s, returned on bass. Now a trio, the band started demoing material for the next release in July 1991.They then travelled to Burbank, California, in the US to collaborate with producer Gavin MacKillop, known for his work with the Church and Shriekback. Peter Holsapple of the dB's then joined the band on keyboards. Prior to anything being done, drummer James Stephenson quit, having homesickness and reportedly clashing with Holsapple. Mauro Ruby took on Stephenson's role; Lisa Mednick and Steven Schayer of Clay Idols joined on keyboards and backing vocals, respectively. Van Dyke Parks contributed to the album, scoring "Water Wolves".

== Release ==
"The Male Monster from the Id", the album's lead single, became the most added song from the album at college radio stations in the US. By July 1992, Earl Robertson joined on drums. 100 shows were planned to promote the album; early into the itinerary, after completed shows of New Zealand and Australia, the band felt that Robertson did not fit in. He was subsequently replaced by Craig Mason of Able Tasmans, who was already working with the band as their lighting engineer. By the time the tour made it to the US, "Double Summer" was released as a single. Line-up issues were causing tension with the band, in addition to lower ticket sales than anticipated. Sometime around this, their label Slash Records withdrew further promotion in the US and the UK. In addition, London Recordings, who distributed Slash's releases in the UK, cancelled their support for the band's upcoming tour. In response, Phillipps promptly broke up the band after their final show in the US.

== Critical reception ==
Professional ratings
Review scores
Source	Rating
AllMusic	3/5 stars
Alternative Rock	8/10
Robert Christgau	A−

The New York Times wrote: "Strange and majestic, these songs are Mr. Phillipps's attempt to test and reshape the possibilities of pop." The Washington Post called it "a shimmering, buoyant pleasure." For author Dave Thompson, in his book Alternative Rock (2000), the bulk of his review was centered on "Song for Randy Newman Etc", while also highlighting "Water Wolves" and "Double Summer".

== Track listing ==
All songs written by Martin Phillipps.

1. "The Male Monster from the Id"
2. "Background Affair"
3. "Ocean Ocean"
4. "Soft Bomb"
5. "there is no harm in trying"
6. "Strange Case"
7. "Soft Bomb II"
8. "So Long"
9. "Song for Randy Newman etc."
10. "Sleeping Giants"
11. "Double Summer"
12. "Sanctuary"
13. "Halo Fading"
14. "there is no point in trying"
15. "Entertainer"
16. "Water Wolves"
17. "Soft Bomb III"
