= Pink Frost =

Single by The Chills

from the album Kaleidoscope World
- B-side: "Purple Girl"
- Released: June 1984
- Recorded: May 29, 1982
- Studio: The Lab, Auckland
- Genre: Dunedin sound, indie pop, neo-psychedelia
- Length: 3:59
- Label: Flying Nun
- Songwriter: Martin Phillipps

The Chills singles chronology
"Rolling Moon" (1982)	"Pink Frost" (1984)	"Doledrums" (1984)

Music video
- "Pink Frost" on YouTube

"Pink Frost" is a song by New Zealand band The Chills. The song was originally recorded in 1982. It was released as a single in 1984. Its B-side was the instrumental track "Purple Girl". It reached number 17 on the New Zealand singles chart.

The song was written by lead singer/guitarist Martin Phillipps, and features a line-up of Phillipps, Terry Moore (bass, backing vocals, percussion), and Martyn Bull (drums, percussion). The song was recorded on 29 May 1982 at The Lab Studios in Auckland and mixed in January 1984 at Auckland's Progressive Studios by Terry King, Doug Hood, Chris Knox, and band members Moore and Phillipps. It was released in June 1984. Owing to the length of time taken to release the track, it was a posthumous release for Bull, who had died of leukaemia during 1983. All of the proceeds made from the single's sales were donated to Cancer Research.

The song was initially released as a single only, but later featured on the 1985 Flying Nun compilation Tuatara (album) and 1986 compilation album Kaleidoscope World. A video was filmed in and around Sandymount and Taiaroa Head on Otago Peninsula.

The song is considered important to the Dunedin sound style and features a solid drum rhythm over which bass and a high guitar form complementary lead lines. Phillipps' vocals — telling a gothic tale of a lover accidentally killing his partner in his sleep — float above this rolling string pattern.

== Covers ==
- Los Angeles band Babyland recorded the song and released in on their 1994 album A Total Letdown
- Joel RL Phelps and the Downer Trio covered it on their album Tradition in 2004.
