= The Shape of Dolls =

EP by Able Tasmans
- Released: 1993
- Recorded: July 1993
- Genre: Rock
- Length: 19:31
- Label: Flying Nun
- Producer: Victor Grbic

Able Tasmans chronology
The Tired Sun (1985)	The Shape of Dolls (1993)

Professional ratings
Review scores
Source	Rating
Allmusic	2.5/5 stars

The Shape of Dolls is an EP by New Zealand band Able Tasmans, released on Flying Nun Records in 1993.

== Track listing ==
1. "Dog-Whelk" – 3:43
2. "The Big Bang Theory" – 3:59
3. "Coming Up For Air" – 3:39
4. "Mayfly May" – 4:19
5. "The Shape of Dolls" – 3:47
