= Silver Bullets (album) =

2015 studio album by The Chills

Studio album by The Chills
- Released: 30 October 2015
- Genre: Indie pop, indie rock
- Label: Fire Records

The Chills chronology
Sunburnt (1996)	Silver Bullets (2015)	Snow Bound (2018)

Silver Bullets is an album by New Zealand group the Chills, released on 30 October 2015.

Martin Phillipps spoke of the 19-year gap since their previous album. "We just couldn't. There's been a lot of frustration but finally, somebody got behind us with the money and belief in both me and the band. It all happened quite quickly too. Off it went!'"

The album cover of Silver Bullets was created by Dunedin-based artist Bruce Mahalski.

== Reception ==
Professional ratings
Aggregate scores
Source	Rating
Metacritic	79/100
Review scores
Source	Rating
AllMusic	3.5/5 stars
Chicago Tribune	3.5/4 stars
Drowned in Sound	9/10
The Guardian	4/5 stars
Mojo	3/5 stars
Pitchfork	6.9/10
Q	4/5 stars
Record Collector	4/5 stars
Uncut	4/5 stars
Under the Radar	6.5/10

Pitchfork said, "guitars wreathed in reverb, organs heaving, Phillipps' voice, as quietly assured as ever. Combining delicate grace with ornate detailing is no easy feat, but on Silver Bullets, Phillipps manages it again and again."

The Guardian said, "The Chills' appeal always lay in their ability to combine brightness and murkiness – they sound almost like the musical embodiment of autumn, part windswept and part golden – and that's very much present on Silver Bullets, a minor triumph of an album." Drowned in Sound noted, "the mini cinemas of Silver Bullets showcase all of The Chills' true strengths. Their heroic compassion inspires love, preaches empathy, sustains life. Praise them as saints."

== Track listing ==
All songs written by Martin Phillipps.

1. "Father Time" – 0:34
2. "Warm Waveform" – 4:10
3. "Silver Bullets" – 3:58
4. "Underwater Wasteland" – 5:27
5. "America Says Hello" – 5:05
6. "Liquid Situation" – 0:50
7. "Pyramid / When the Poor Can Reach the Moon" – 8:03
8. "Aurora Corona" – 4:28
9. "I Can't Help You" – 3:10
10. "Tomboy" – 4:42
11. "Molten Gold" – 3:25
