= Pot Boiler =

Studio album by The Verlaines
- Released: 2007
- Label: Flying Nun Records

The Verlaines chronology
You're Just Too Obscure for Me (2003)	Pot Boiler (2007)	Corporate Moronic (2009)

Pot Boiler is a 2007 album by The Verlaines on Flying Nun Records.

== Track listing ==
All songs written by Graeme Downes except "Sunday in Sevastopol", music by Graeme Downes, lyrics by David Kominsky.

1. "Midlife Crisis" – 3:19
2. "Stop Messing Around" – 2:58
3. "It's Easier to Harden a Broken Heart (than mend it)" – 4:56
4. "Don't Leave" – 3:16
5. "Forgive Thine Enemies (but don't forget their names)" – 3:03
6. "Tragic Boy" – 4:15
7. "Sunday in Sevastopol" – 5:11
8. "All Messed Up" – 3:29
9. "16 Years" – 3:01
10. "If You Can't Beat Them" – 4:10
11. "Real Good Life" – 4:00

== Personnel ==
- Graeme Downes
- Darren Stedman
- Russell Fleming
- Paul Winders
- Gary Valentine – Trumpet
- Dan Bendrups – Trombone
- Kevin A. Lefohn – Violin
- Kate Hamilton – Viola
- Greg Hamilton – Cello
- Libby Hamilton – Backing vocals
- Anthony Lander – Backing vocals
- Dale Cotton – Mixing

== Reviews ==
- Review at muzic.net.nz
- Review at A Jumped-up Pantry Boy
- Review at New Zealand Listener
