= Dead Famous People =

New Zealand indie pop band

Dead Famous People are a New Zealand indie pop band formed in Auckland, active from the latter half of the 1980s onward. Dead Famous People are still active today, Savage using various collaborators, with a new album being recorded in Auckland New Zealand, following an extended break taken to raise her son, Harry.

"Looking at Girls" their first single on Fire Records (UK), was released on 24 October 2019. Their second single "Groovy Girl" was released on 12 February 2020, also on Fire Records. The ten-track album "Harry" was released on 9 October 2020 on Fire records. Their new album "Ballet boy" was released on May 29, 2023, recorded in Auckland, New Zealand It features 10 new tracks.

A new album, WILD YOUNG WAYS was released in September 2025. Consisting of lost tracks from the bands time in the UK, it is released by Tiny Global Productions. The album Ballet boy is soon to be released in CD format. Later in 2026 DFP will release an album of new material.

== History ==
The band formed in 1986 and comprised Dons Savage (vocals), Elizabeth (Biddy) Leyland (keyboards and vocals), Wendy Kjestrup (guitar and vocals), Jenny Renals (bass guitar) and Robyn Tearle (drums). After a couple of releases in New Zealand, including an EP on Flying Nun Records, giving them some success in their homeland, they relocated to London, where they signed for Billy Bragg's Utility Records label, with Gill Moon replacing Tearle. Utility issued the band's Arriving Late in Torn and Filthy Jeans mini-LP in 1989, and it became the label's biggest-selling release. They received regular airplay from John Peel and recorded a session for his BBC Radio 1 show in 1989. Jenny Renals and Wendy Kjestrup left the band in 1990. Savage joined Saint Etienne on their cover version of The Field Mice's "Let's Kiss and Make Up", and subsequently recorded as a solo artist, as did Leyland. Savage also provided backing vocals on The Chills' "Heavenly Pop Hit".

The band contributed a version of "True Love Leaves No Traces" to the 1991 Leonard Cohen tribute album I'm Your Fan.

Savage continues with the Dead Famous People name, with various collaborators, and another album, Secret Girls Business, was issued in 2002, featuring six previously unreleased tracks.

Dead Famous People released a 10-song album in 2020, titled Harry, which was recorded in Auckland and released on Fire Records.

== Discography ==
=== Singles, EPs ===
- "Drive Away" (1987), Craft – split Flexi-disc with Screeming Custard
- Lost Persons Area (1987), Flying Nun – 12-inch vinyl EP
- "Looking at Girls" Digital single (24 October 2019)- Fire Records (UK)

=== Albums ===
- Arriving Late in Torn and Filthy Jeans (1989), Utility
- All Hail The Daffodil (1994), La-Di-Da – 'best of' compilation
- Secret Girls Business (2002), Global Routes
- Harry (2020)
- Ballet Boy (2023), digital release
- Wild Young Ways (2025)

=== Compilation appearances ===
- In Love With These Times (1989), Flying Nun: "Barlow's House"
- Borobudur (1990), La-Di-Da: "All Hail The Daffodil"
- I'm Your Fan (1991), Atlantic: "True Love leaves No Traces"
- La Di Da..so far (1991), La-Di-Da: "With Wings We'll Soar The Heavens"
- La Di Bloody Da (1994), La-Di-Da: "Desperate Orange Love Plunge"
- 25 Years Box (2006), Flying Nun: "Barlow's House"
