= Able Tasmans =

- Origin: Auckland, New Zealand
- Genres: Indie pop, folk rock
- Years active: 1983–1996
- Labels: Flying Nun
- Spinoffs: Humphreys & Keen
- Past members: Graeme Humphreys; Craig Baxter; Peter Keen; David Beniston; Leslie Jonkers; Craig Mason; Jane Dodd; Ronald Young; Stuart Greenway; Alice Bulmer

Able Tasmans were an indie pop band from Auckland, New Zealand, initially formed as a duo in 1983. They released four albums and two EPs on Flying Nun Records before splitting up in 1996.

== History ==
The band formed in 1983, named after the Dutch explorer Abel Tasman. The initial lineup was Graeme Humphreys (vocals/keyboards) and Craig Baxter (drums). Humphreys and Baxter had previous played together in the Whangārei band Sister Ray. David Beniston (bass guitar) and Peter Keen (vocals/guitar, formerly of Raucous Laughter) soon joined, with Keen taking a lead on vocals. Anthony Nevison (later of Headless Chickens) played on a few songs on the band's first release, The Tired Sun EP, released in 1985 by Flying Nun Records.

Organist Leslie Jonkers joined before the band recorded their debut album (A Cuppa Tea and a Lie Down (1987)), with Stuart Greenway replacing Baxter on drums. The album was described by Trouser Press as "one of the finest records ever to emerge from New Zealand", and by AllMusic as "a great album filled with sweet and crafty pop songs". Humphreys, Keen, and Jonkers became the core of the band, and for the second album (Hey Spinner! (1990)) were joined by former Verlaines and Chills bassist Jane Dodd, synth player Ronald Young, and drummer Craig Mason (another former Chills member). This lineup continued for Somebody Ate My Planet (1992) and The Shape of Dolls (1993). After a spell with no new releases, the band returned in 1996 with Store in a Cool Place (1996), now without Young, splitting up prior to its release.

A 'best of' compilation, Songs from the Departure Lounge, was released in 2000.

== Post-split activities ==
Ten years after the band split up, Humphreys and Keen regrouped to record an album, The Overflow, under the name of Humphreys & Keen, although the album also featured Dodd, Young, Jonkers and Mason.

Graeme Humphreys is now better known in New Zealand for his role as a radio talkback host (under the name Graeme Hill).

David Beniston died in Melbourne on 7 May 2011, due to an aneurysm.

== Musical style ==
The band's style of music could be considered as somewhat similar to the prevalent Dunedin sound, as recorded by Flying Nun during the 1980s and most effective when keyboards (not normally prominent in the Dunedin sound) were to the fore, as on their early student radio hit "Snow White Chook". Their music has been described as folk rock, indie pop, chamber pop, and baroque pop.

AllMusic writer Jason Ankeny described the band as having "a tongue-in-cheek, '60s-influenced aesthetic" in their early years.

== Discography ==
| Date of Release | Title | Label | Charted | Certification | Catalogue Number |
|---|---|---|---|---|---|
Albums
| 1987 | A Cuppa Tea and a Lie Down | Flying Nun Records/Flying Nun Europe | - | - | FN075, FNE18 |
| 1990 | Hey Spinner! | Flying Nun Records | - | - | FN162 |
| 1992 | Somebody Ate My Planet | Flying Nun Records; Festival Records | - | - | FNCD233; D30807 |
| 1995 | Store in a Cool Place | Flying Nun Records; Festival Records | - | - | album: FN312; L31461 CD: FNCD312; D 31461 |
Compilation albums
| 1998 | Songs from the Departure Lounge | Flying Nun Records | - | - | FNCD404 |
EPs
| 1985 | The Tired Sun | Flying Nun Records | 42 | - | FN043 |
| 1993 | The Shape of Dolls | Flying Nun Records; Festival Records | 39 | - | FNCD280; D17044 |
Singles
| 1986 | A: Able Tasmans, "Buffalos" B: Raucous Laughter, "Relapse" | Flying Nun Records; Festival Records | - | - | FN067 |

=== Featured appearances ===
The group have appeared on a few CD and DVD compilations since 1991 in New Zealand. The following is a list of these albums that have featured tracks by the Able Tasmans.

- (1990) - In Love With These Times (Flying Nun Records) - "What Was That Thing?"
- (1991) - Roger Sings the Hits (Flying Nun Records) - "Getting Older"
- (1991) - Getting Older 1981–1991 (Flying Nun Records) - "Sour Queen"
- (1995) - Abbasalutely (Flying Nun Records) - "S.O.S." (ABBA cover)
- (2004) - Second Season Flying Nun DVD II (Flying Nun Records) - "Big Bang Theory"
- (2004) - Very Short Films (Flying Nun Records) - "Hold Me 1"
