= Juvenilia (album) =

Studio album by The Verlaines
- Released: 1987
- Label: Flying Nun Records

The Verlaines chronology
Bird Dog (1987)	Juvenilia (1987)	Some Disenchanted Evening (1989)

Professional ratings
Review scores
Source	Rating
AllMusic	4.5/5 stars

Juvenilia is a compilation album by the New Zealand group The Verlaines, released in 1987 by Flying Nun Records. It collects the band's early singles and EPs on CD. Juvenilia was the first Verlaines album to be released on CD.

== Track listing ==
1. "Death And The Maiden"
2. "Doomsday"
3. "Joed Out"
4. "Baud To Tears"
5. "Crisis After Crisis"
6. "Burlesque"
7. "You Cheat Yourself Of Everything That Moves"
8. "Pyromaniac"
9. "Windsong"
10. "Angela"
11. "You Say You"
12. "New Kind Of Hero"
13. "Instrumental"
14. "Phil Too?"
15. "C.D Jimmy Jazz And Me"
