= Sunburnt =

Studio album by Martin Phillipps & the Chills
- Released: 8 October 1996
- Recorded: August 1995 – September 1995
- Studio: Doghouse, Henley-on-Thames
- Genre: Jangle pop
- Length: 40:29
- Label: Flying Nun
- Producer: Craig Leon

Martin Phillipps & the Chills chronology
Heavenly Pop Hits – The Best of The Chills (1994)	Sunburnt (1996)	Secret Box (2000)

Singles from Sunburnt
- 1. "Come Home"; 2. "Surrounded"

Sunburnt is an album by Martin Phillipps & the Chills, though more correctly by Martin Phillipps alone. Owing to visa problems, the usual Chills line-up were not able to take part in the recording sessions, and session musicians Dave Gregory and Dave Mattacks appeared on all tracks, with Phillipps handling vocal, keyboard, and guitar parts, as well as some of the percussion. Craig Leon, the album's producer, also appeared on several of the tracks.

== Background and production ==
The Chills released their third studio album Soft Bomb in 1992. Its lead single "The Male Monster from the Id" became the most added song from the album at college radio stations in the US. 100 shows were planned to promote the album; by the time they made it to the US, line-up issues were causing tension with the band, in addition to lower ticket sales than anticipated. Sometime around this, their label Slash Records withdrew further promotion in the US and the UK. Similarly, London Recordings, who distributed Slash's releases in the UK, cancelled their support for the band's upcoming tour. In response, frontman Martin Phillipps promptly broke up the band after their final show in the US. He moved back to the band's hometown of Dunedin, New Zealand to deal with a myriad of legal and contractual issues that were leftover. He occasionally performed solo around the city, and played with David Kilgour in the latter's act Pop Art Toasters. A Chills greatest hits compilation, Heavenly Pop Hits – The Best of The Chills (1994), was issued as Phillipps worked on demos, planned for release as Sketch Book: Volume One (1999).

Phillipps re-joined the Clean as their second guitarist when they reunited in early 1995; by April 1995, Phillipps was performing as the April Fools with Kilgour and former Chills drummer Alan Haig. At the middle of the year, Phillipps had relocated to Auckland, where he created a new band, featuring bassist Steven Shaw, drummer Jonathan Armstrong of Book of Martyrs and keyboardist Dominic Blazer. Christened Martin Phillipps & the Chills, the band planned to travel to London, England to work on an album in July 1995. Phillipps made it, but the rest of the members were unable to as issues with their visas had them sent back home by the immigration office. Phillipps made Sunburnt with Craig Leon as producer, accompanied by session musicians; Dave Gregory, formerly of XTC, on bass and Dave Mattacks, formerly of Fairport Convention, on drums. The album was recorded at Doghouse Studios in Oxfordshire in August and September 1995, and mixed and mastered at Rockfield Studios in Wales and Townhouse Studios in London.

== Release ==
Phillipps travelled back to New Zealand to be with the rest of band; Blazer left and was replaced by Andrew Taylor, who in turn left in August 1996 with Shaw. With a new line-up of Armstrong, bassist Phil Kusabs and drummer Tom Miskin, they performed a handful of shows. It was released by Flying Nun Records in 1996.

== Critical reception ==
Professional ratings
Review scores
Source	Rating
AllMusic	4/5 stars
Alternative Rock	5/10
Robert Christgau	(1-star Honorable Mention)

Trouser Press wrote that it "lacks the drive of the best of the band’s singles." Author Dave Thompson, in his book Alternative Rock (2000), called it a "solid, but not too memorable collection scarred by the inadvertent loss of [Phillipps's] entire band."

== Track listing ==
All tracks written by Martin Phillipps.

1. "As Far as I Can See" – 3:28
2. "Premonition" – 2:54
3. "Surrounded" – 2:48
4. "Come Home" – 3:09
5. "Sunburnt" – 3:42
6. "The Big Assessment" – 2:59
7. "Swimming in the Rain" – 3:38
8. "Dreams Are Free" – 2:07
9. "You Can Understand Me" – 3:20
10. "Lost in Future Ruins" – 3:10
11. "New Millennium" – 3:29
12. "Walk on the Beach" – 2:38
13. "Secret Garden" – 3:07

Two singles were released from the album — "Come Home" and "Surrounded".
