= Death and the Maiden (The Verlaines song) =

Single by The Verlaines
- Released: June 1983
- Recorded: 1982
- Genre: Post-punk
- Length: 4 min 27 s
- Label: Flying Nun FN014
- Songwriter: Graeme Downes

"Death and the Maiden" is a song by New Zealand rock band The Verlaines, who are one of a number of 1980s bands signed to Flying Nun Records and attributed to the Dunedin Sound. It was released as a single in 1983 and is arguably the most popular song in their discography. The 'B' side of the record was "CD, Jimmy Jazz & Me."

"Death and the Maiden" later appeared on the 1987 album Juvenilia, which was a collection of The Verlaines' early singles and EPs.

New Zealand rock band Elemeno P released a cover version of this song on their 2005 album Trouble in Paradise. Former Pavement frontman Stephen Malkmus also recorded a version for the Flying Nun Records tribute album Under the Influence - 21 Years of Flying Nun Records in 2002. Boston band Prickly covered the song on their 1997 LP Velleity.

== Meaning of the lyrics ==
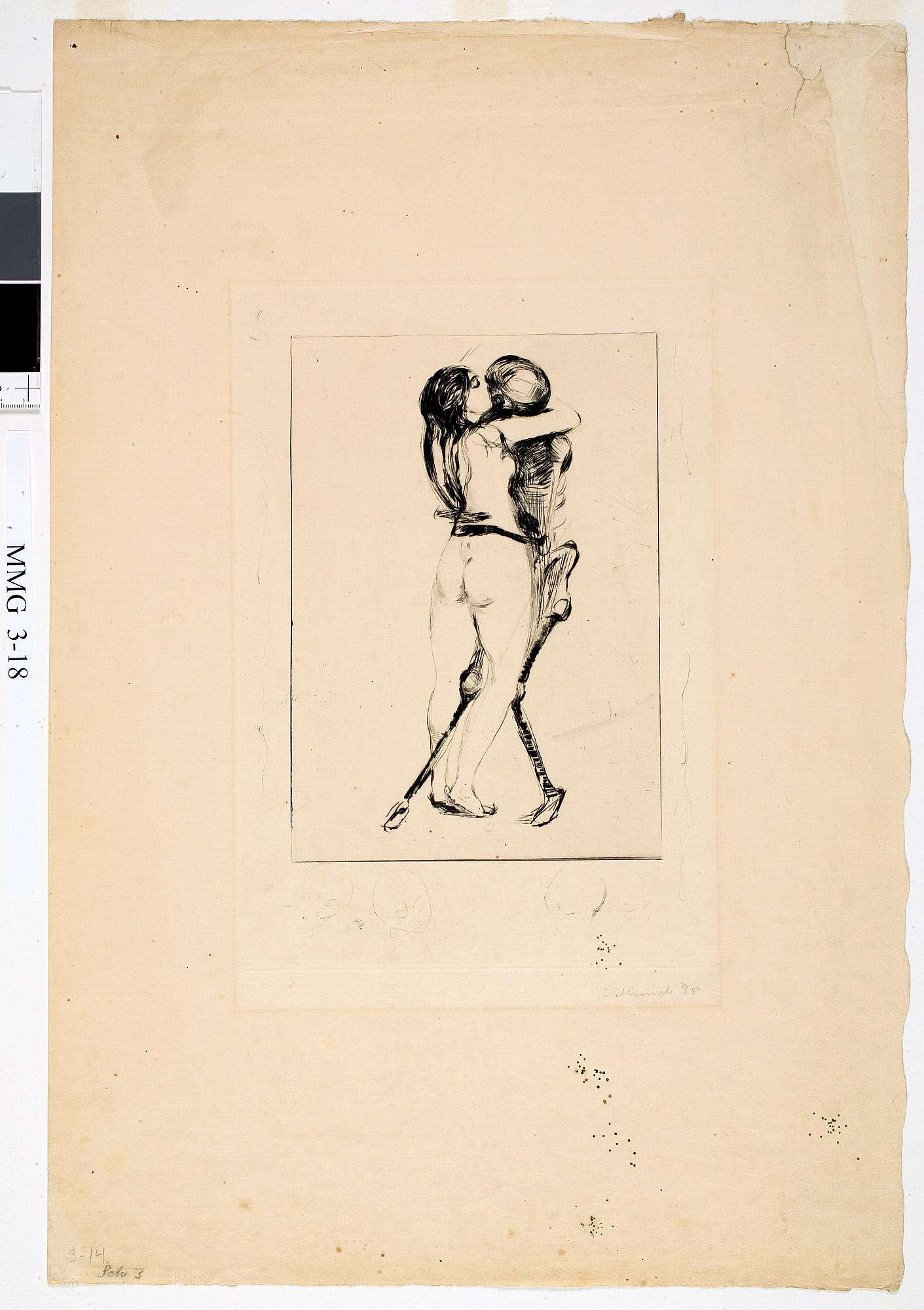
"Death and the Woman" by Edvard Munch

You'll only end up like Rimbaud
Get shot by Verlaine, Verlaine, Verlaine, Verlaine....
The lyrics above refer to Paul Verlaine, a 19th-century French poet. After going into a drunken rage, Verlaine shot his lover – fellow poet Arthur Rimbaud in July 1873. The Verlaines took their name from the French poet.

Shall we have our photo taken?
We'll look like Death and the Maiden
This is a most likely a reference to a print of the same name by Edvard Munch. The image is reproduced on the label of the Verlaines' side of the "Dunedin Double" EP, which was issued the year before the release of "Death and the Maiden".

== In the media ==
- Featured in New Zealand movie Scarfies and on its soundtrack release.
