= Time to Go: The Southern Psychedelic Moment 1981–86 =

Time To Go - The Southern Psychedelic Moment: 1981–86

Compilation album by Various
- Released: 2012
- Label: Flying Nun Records

Time To Go - The Southern Psychedelic Moment: 1981–86 is a compilation album released in 2012 by recording label Flying Nun Records, compiled and curated by Bruce Russell.

== Track listing ==
1. The Pin Group - Jim - 05:08
2. The Clean - In The Back - 01:56
3. Playthings - Sit Down - 02:15
4. The Gordons - I Just Can't Stop - 02:35
5. The Builders - Russian Rug - 06:49
6. Victor Dimisich Band - It's Cold Outside - 04:24
7. Tall Dwarfs - Clover - 02:08
8. The Chills - Flamethrower - 03:15
9. 25 Cents - Don't Deceive Me - 02:34
10. The Stones - Down And Around - 05:14
11. The Great Unwashed - Obscurity Blues - 03:06
12. Sneaky Feelings - Not To Take Sides - 04:49
13. Scorched Earth Policy - Since The Accident - 03:22
14. The Shallows - Trial By Separation - 04:27
15. Look Blue Go Purple - As Does The Sun - 03:12
16. The Puddle - Junk - 03:07
17. Max Block - Psychic Discharge - 01:22
18. Wreck Small Speakers On Expensive Stereos - Rain - 02:17
19. The DoubleHappys - Some Fantasy - 04:35
20. The Rip - Wrecked Wee Hymn - 05:27
