= Wet blanket =

Wet blanket may refer to:

- Fire blanket, a wet blanket used as a device to put out a fire
- Wet Blanket Policy, an animated cartoon
- "Wet Blanket", a 1987 song from The Chills' Brave Words
