= Way Out Where =

Studio album by the Verlaines
- Released: 1993
- Studio: NRG; North Hollywood, Los Angeles, California, U.S.
- Label: Slash

The Verlaines chronology
Ready to Fly (1991)	Way Out Where (1993)	Over the Moon (1996)

Professional ratings
Review scores
Source	Rating
AllMusic	3/5 stars
Chicago Tribune	3/4 stars

Way Out Where is an album by the Verlaines. Recorded at NRG Recording Studios in North Hollywood, Los Angeles, it was released in 1993 by Slash Records.

== Track listing ==
All songs written by Graeme Downes.

1. "Mission of Love" – 4:02
2. "I Stare Out..." – 3:25
3. "This Valentine" – 4:41
4. "Blanket Over the Sky" – 3:20
5. "Cathedrals Under the Sea" – 3:24
6. "Aches in Whisper" – 3:47
7. "Way Out Where" – 3:32
8. "Lucky in My Dreams" – 4:03
9. "Black Wings" – 3:15
10. "Stay Gone" – 4:10
11. "Incarceration" – 3:37
12. "Dirge" – 4:07
