= Somebody Ate My Planet =

Studio album by Able Tasmans
- Released: 12 August 1992
- Recorded: December 1991 – January 1992 at Lab Studios (Auckland, New Zealand)
- Genre: Indie pop
- Length: 41:21
- Label: Flying Nun Records
- Producer: Able Tasmans, Victor Grbic, Fred E. Rick

Able Tasmans chronology
Hey Spinner (1990)	Somebody Ate My Planet (1992)	Store in a Cool Place (1995)

Professional ratings
Review scores
Source	Rating
AllMusic	2.5/5 stars

Somebody Ate My Planet is an album released on 12 August 1992 by the New Zealand band Able Tasmans.

The album's concept is environmentalism, incorporating folk rock, guitar pop, and 1960s sounds.

== Track listing ==
1. "Circular"
2. "Fault in the Frog"
3. "School Is No Good for You"
4. "Asian Aphrodisiac Solution"
5. "The Cliff"
6. "Weight of Love"
7. "Sweet State"
8. "Napoleons Last Letter to France"
9. "A Conversation with Mark Byram"
10. "Big Fat"
11. "Not Fair"
