= Submarine Bells =

Studio album by The Chills
- Released: February 1990
- Recorded: August–October 1989
- Studios: Jacobs, Surrey
- Genres: Dunedin sound; jangle pop; indie pop
- Length: 35:52
- Labels: Flying Nun; Slash
- Producer: Gary Smith

The Chills chronology
Brave Words (1987)	Submarine Bells (1990)	Soft Bomb (1992)

Singles from Submarine Bells
- 1. "Heavenly Pop Hit" Released: 1990; 2. "Part Past Part Fiction" Released: 1990; 3. "The Oncoming Day" Released: 1990

Submarine Bells is the second studio album by New Zealand band the Chills, released in 1990. It was the band's first album on a major label, as Martin Phillipps signed to Warner Bros. Records subsidiary Slash Records to release the album in the United States. Submarine Bells reached number one on the New Zealand albums chart and had significant support from American college radio. The album was awarded gold status in New Zealand and represents the peak of the Chills' popularity at home. It is considered to be one of the defining albums of the Dunedin sound. The supporting tour for Submarine Bells culminated in a triumphant home-coming concert in Dunedin Town Hall.

== Background ==
The Chills released their debut studio album Brave Words in 1987; they had relocated to London earlier in the year. The band promoted it with a performance at Glastonbury Festival in June 1987 to over 60,000 people. After playing at the New Music Seminar in New York City, the band went on tours of the United Kingdom and mainland Europe. "House with a Hundred Rooms" was released as a single, reaching number 21 on the UK Independent Singles Chart. A tour of New Zealand and Australia followed at the end of the year. Drummer Caroline Easther left after New Year's, and was replaced by James Stephenson, formerly of Bygone Era. The Chills then embarked on a tour of the United States; coinciding with this, they signed to independent label Slash Records and major label Warner Bros. Records. Upon returning to London in early 1989, the band started working with Gary Smith for their next album Submarine Bells.

== Critical reception ==
Professional ratings
Review scores
Source	Rating
AllMusic	4/5 stars
Chicago Tribune	3.5/4 stars
Christgau's Consumer Guide	A
Mojo	4/5 stars
NME	8/10
The Philadelphia Inquirer	3.5/4 stars
Record Mirror	5/5
Rolling Stone	3/5 stars
Spin Alternative Record Guide	8/10
Uncut	8/10

Trouser Press singled out the "splendorous title track", the "should-have-been-a-smash 'Heavenly Pop Hit'", and many other individual tracks, but chiefly praised the album for its overall cohesion and consistency – signs of the Chills' evolution from "a first-rate singles band" to a fully formed artistic venture with a "mature, restrained and affectingly personal approach". In his book Music: What Happened?, musician and critic Scott Miller calls it "a dynamite whole album", and "the international star and culmination of" the Dunedin sound. He also ranks "Heavenly Pop Hit" among the year's best songs.

== Chart performance and awards ==
Submarine Bells was a huge success in the Chills' home country. It entered the New Zealand albums chart at No. 7 in June 1990 and reached No. 1 the following week, ultimately spending 14 weeks on the chart in total. The single "Heavenly Pop Hit" was released in July and peaked at No. 2 on the singles chart. Elsewhere, however, it made minimal commercial impact. The album charted at No. 90 in Australia, while in the UK and US, it did not chart, although "Heavenly Pop Hit" achieved some success on the UK Singles Chart and the US Billboard Modern Rock Tracks chart. "Part Past Part Fiction" was released by Slash as a single in Australia, but did not enter the chart.

The album won Best Album at the 1990 New Zealand Music Awards, and "Heavenly Pop Hit" won Single of the Year.

== Track listing ==
All songs written by Martin Phillipps.

1. "Heavenly Pop Hit"
2. "Tied Up in Chain"
3. "The Oncoming Day"
4. "Part Past Part Fiction"
5. "Singing in My Sleep"
6. "I Soar"
7. "Dead Web"
8. "Familiarity Breeds Contempt"
9. "Don't Be – Memory"
10. "Effloresce and Deliquesce"
11. "Sweet Times"
12. "Submarine Bells"

== Charts ==
=== Weekly charts ===
Chart (1990)	Peak position
Australian Albums (ARIA)	90
New Zealand Albums (RMNZ)	1

=== Year-end charts ===
Chart (1990)	Position
New Zealand Albums (RMNZ)	41

=== Singles ===
Year	Single	Region	Chart	Position	Citation
1990	"Heavenly Pop Hit"	New Zealand	NZ Singles Chart	2	
1990	"Heavenly Pop Hit"	US	Billboard Modern Rock Tracks	17	
1990	"Heavenly Pop Hit"	UK	UK Singles Chart	97	
1990	"Part Past Part Fiction"	Australia	Australian Singles Chart	–	
