= Tuatara (album) =

Compilation album by Flying Nun Records
- Released: 1985
- Genre: Rock
- Label: Flying Nun

Flying Nun Records chronology
Dunedin Double (1984)	Tuatara (1985)	In Love With These Times (1990)

Professional ratings
Review scores
Source	Rating
AllMusic	link

Tuatara – A Flying Nun Compilation is a compilation of previously released songs by artists on New Zealand based Flying Nun Records. It was released as a vinyl album by Flying Nun in 1985 (catalogue number FN045) and on CD with additional tracks. The Chills track was mistakenly attributed to "The Cills".

== Track listing ==
1. "Fish" – The Clean (2:26)
2. "Coalminer's Song" – The Gordons (5:57)
3. "State to Be in" – Fetus Productions (2:40)
4. "Death And the Maiden" – The Verlaines (4:34)
5. "Looking For the Sun" – Children's Hour (6:06)
6. "Isol" – Marie and the Atom (5:32)
7. "Pink Frost" – The Chills (4:03)
8. "Throwing Stones" – Sneaky Feelings (4:40)
9. "Neck of the Woods" – The Great Unwashed (2:07)
10. "I Go Wild" – The Bats (2:44)
11. "Man With No Desire" – The Expendables (5:15)
12. "The Brain That Wouldn't Die" – Tall Dwarfs
  Additional tracks on CD edition
13. "Circumspect Penelope" – Look Blue Go Purple (2:53)
14. "Since The Accident" – Scorched Earth Policy (3:21)
15. "Needles And Plastic" – Doublehappys (5:25)
