= In Love with These Times =

In Love With These Times

Compilation album by Flying Nun Records
- Released: 1990
- Recorded: 1986–1988
- Genre: Rock
- Length: 67:25 (19 songs)
- Label: Flying Nun

Flying Nun Records chronology
Tuatara (1985)	In Love With These Times (1990)	Pink Flying Saucers Over the Southern Alps (1991)

Professional ratings
Review scores
Source	Rating
Allmusic	link

In Love With These Times is a compilation of previously released songs by artists on New Zealand based Flying Nun Records. It was released by Flying Nun in 1990 and re-released in a 2CD package with the 1991 compilation Pink Flying Saucers Over the Southern Alps. The CD version released by Flying Nun Europe contained an additional six tracks which were omitted from the re-release.

The title In Love With These Times was later used by Flying Nun's founder, Roger Shepherd, as the title of his 2016 autobiography.

== Track listing ==
1. "Rain" - The Chills
2. "She Speeds" - Straitjacket Fits
3. "Cactus Cat" - Look Blue Go Purple
4. "Flex" - Jean-Paul Sartre Experience
5. "North By North" - The Bats
6. "Trouble With Kay" - Sneaky Feelings
7. "Slow Sad Love Song" - Verlaines
8. "Grader Spader" - Bailter Space
9. "Donka" - Headless Chickens
10. "What Was That Thing?" - Able Tasmans
11. "A.F.F.C.O." - The Skeptics
12. "Hang On" - Snapper
13. "The Slide" - Tall Dwarfs
  Additional tracks on Flying Nun Europe CD edition
14. "Barlow's House" - Dead Famous People
15. "The Boy With the Sad Hands" - Jay Clarkson
16. "Jaffa Boy" - Bird Nest Roys
17. "Mothlight" - The Terminals
18. "Immigration Song" - This Kind of Punishment
19. "The Wheel" - The Dead C
