= Jack Phillipps =

Phillipps in 1933

John Hugh Phillipps CBE (born Auckland, 1 January 1898, died Wellington, New Zealand, 8 June 1977) was a New Zealand cricket administrator. He managed the New Zealand cricket team's tours of England in 1949 and 1958, and the MCC's tour of New Zealand in 1960-61.

== Life and career ==
Phillipps served as a rifleman with the New Zealand forces in the First World War, and in the Transport Corps in the Second World War as a lieutenant colonel. He was appointed an Officer of the Order of the British Empire in the 1946 New Year Honours.

Of his management of the 1949 team, Wisden commented: "No more efficient or courteous manager of a touring side can be imagined than Mr J.H. Phillipps." He also played in the two-day match against Durham but did not bat or bowl.

A benefit match for him was played in Wellington in December 1956, between Wellington and "J.H. Phillipps' XI", a team of players from the 1949 touring team. It was regarded as a first-class match at the time but was later downgraded by the New Zealand authorities, perhaps because many of the Phillipps XI had by that time retired from first-class cricket.

Phillipps worked for the Shell company in New Zealand for 35 years. He retired in December 1957, at which time he was staff manager. He was also the chairman of the New Zealand Broadcasting Corporation's central advisory program, and was the first executive of Outward Bound New Zealand.

After the ill-will caused during the MCC's tour of New Zealand in 1958-59, an MCC tour of New Zealand by a young side of Test aspirants was organised for the 1960–61 season, captained by the diplomatic Dennis Silk and managed by Phillipps.

Phillipps was promoted to Commander of the Order of the British Empire in the 1960 New Year Honours. On 5 July 1960 he was one of 63 administrators and former players from overseas countries to be invited to become honorary life members of the MCC.

His brief Wisden obituary described him as "a man universally loved and respected". The Press in Christchurch described him as "efficient, confident, quick-minded and a fluent speaker".

He was the grandfather of Martin Phillipps, founder of the New Zealand band The Chills.
