= Tuatara (disambiguation) =

Tuatara are a species of reptiles endemic to New Zealand.

Tuatara may also refer to:

- Mount Tuatara, summit of the Churchill Mountains in Antarctica
- Chris Tuatara-Morrison (born 1986, as Chris Tuatara), Australian rugby player
- Tuatara (character), a DC Comics character
- Auckland Tuatara, a New Zealand professional baseball club
- Tuatara (band), a Seattle-based instrumental music group
- Tuatara (album), by artists on New Zealand-based Flying Nun Records
- SSC Tuatara, an automobile
- Tuatara Games, video game developer: see List of Xbox One games (A–L)
- The Tuatara (book) by Brian Parkinson: see Storylines Children's Literature Foundation of New Zealand Notable Books List
- Tuatara (company), a Polish-based company
- Auckland Tuatara (basketball), semi-professional basketball team from New Zealand
