= GG 300 =

GG 300 may refer to:

- "GG 300", a track on the Able Tasmans 1995 album Store in a Cool Place
- GG 300, the registration plate of the presidential limousine used during the assassination of John F. Kennedy
