= The Lost EP =

EP by The Chills
- Released: 1985
- Recorded: July – September 1984
- Label: Flying Nun Records
- Producers: Phil Yule, Doug Hood

The Chills chronology
Dunedin Double (1982)	The Lost EP (1985)	Kaleidoscope World (1986)

The Lost EP (also known as The "Lost" EP and Lost EP) was a 1985 release by New Zealand band The Chills. The title originates from the fact that the recordings which make up the EP were thought to be lost for some time, resulting in the delayed release of the EP.

All six tracks from the EP were later re-released as part of the Kaleidoscope World compilation CD.

== Reception ==
Spin's Evelyn McDonnell wrote, "The only things lost on this record are the band's minds occasionally, in an exultant haze of rock'n'roll. Phillipps' twisting of words and music is inspiring."

== Track listing ==
1. "This Is the Way"
2. "Never Never Go"
3. "Don't Even Know Her Name"
4. "Bee Bah Bee Bah Bee Boe"
5. "Whole Weird World"
6. "Dream by Dream"
