= Bird dog (disambiguation) =

A bird dog is a dog used in hunting birds.

Bird dog may also refer to:

- Bird dog (exercise)
- Bird Dog (album), a 1987 album by The Verlaines
- "Bird Dog" (song), a 1958 song by the Everly Brothers
- Bird Dog, Cessna L-19 or Cessna O-1 Bird Dog airplane
