= Over the Moon =

Over the Moon may refer to:

== Film ==
- Over the Moon (1939 film), a 1939 British comedy film
- Over the Moon (2020 film), a 2020 animated musical film

== Music ==
- Over the Moon (Judie Tzuke album), 1997
- Over the Moon (The Verlaines album), 1997
- Over the Moon (Ginny Blackmore album), 2015
- Over The Moon (Lee Chaeyeon album), 2023
- "Over the Moon", a song by Cher Lloyd from her 2011 album Sticks + Stones
- "Over the Moon", a song from the musical Rent
