= A Cuppa Tea and a Lie Down =

Studio album by Able Tasmans
- Released: 1987
- Genre: Rock
- Length: 39:35
- Label: Flying Nun

Able Tasmans chronology
The Tired Sun (1985)	A Cuppa Tea and a Lie Down (1987)	Hey Spinner (1990)

Professional ratings
Review scores
Source	Rating
AllMusic	3/5 stars

A Cuppa Tea and a Lie Down is the first album by New Zealand band Able Tasmans. It was released by Flying Nun Records in 1987.

The CD release of the album contains bonus tracks taken from the Tired Sun EP and assorted singles.

== Track listing ==
1. "Inside The Modern"
2. "What Was That Thing"
3. "Little Hearts"
4. "And Relax"
5. "Rainbow"
6. "I See Now Where"
7. "And We Swam The Magic Bay"
8. "Fa Fa Fa Fa"
9. "Sour Queen"
10. "New Sherriff"
11. "Virtues Asunder"
12. "Evil Barbeque"
  CD release only
13. "Buffaloes (Remix)"
14. "Caroline"
15. "Patrick's Mother"
16. "Rhyme For Orange"
17. "Snow White Chook"
