= Look Blue Go Purple =

New Zealand alternative rock band

- Origin: Dunedin, New Zealand
- Genres: Alternative rock, Dunedin sound
- Years active: 1983–1987
- Label: Flying Nun Records
- Past members: Kathy Bull; Norma O'Malley; Lesley Paris; Denise Roughan; Kath Webster

Look Blue Go Purple were an all-female New Zealand alternative rock band from Dunedin, active from 1983 to 1987, recognised as part of the "second wave" of the Dunedin sound. Their first official show was at The Broome Valley Festival on 5 March 1983.

== Members ==
- Kathy Bull – bass
- Norma O'Malley – keyboards, flute
- Lesley Paris – drums
- Denise Roughan – guitar
- Kath Webster – guitar

== Careers after Look Blue Go Purple ==
After the band split up, Bull went on to Cyclops, and has since recorded a solo album, Some From the Sky, under her new name Francisca Griffin. Lesley Paris went on to Olla, and now works as station manager for community radio station Otago Access Radio in Dunedin. Denise Roughan went on to play with The 3Ds and Ghost Club. Norma O'Malley was a founding member of Chug. Paris also became manager of Flying Nun Records. Kath Webster became a journalist, initially in Whangarei. In 2021, she joined the team at AA Directions magazine as Deputy Edior, and was promoted to Editor a few years later.

== Discography ==
Release date	Title	Label	Chart position	Certification	Catalog number
EPs
1985	Bewitched	Flying Nun Records	21	NZ	FNLGBP001
1986	LBGPEP2	Flying Nun Records	26	NZ	FNLGBP002
1988	This Is This	Flying Nun Records	-	-	FN117
Compilations
1986	LBGPEPs (tracks from 'Bewitched' and 'LBGPEP2')	Flying Nun Records	-	-	FNLBGP003
1991	Compilation (tracks from 'Bewitched', 'LBGPEP2' and 'This Is This')	Flying Nun Records	-	-	FNCD171
2017	Still Bewitched (tracks from 'Bewitched', 'LBGPEP2', 'This Is This' and previously unreleased live tracks)	Flying Nun Records	-	-	FN572CD

=== Featured compilations ===
The group have appeared on many compilations since 1986 in New Zealand. The following is a list of these albums that have featured tracks by Look Blue Go Purple.

- (1986) - Tuatara (Flying Nun Records) - "Circumspect Penelope"
- (1989) - In Love with These Times (Flying Nun Records) (FN028) - "Cactus Cat"
- (1991) - Getting Older 1981-1991 (Flying Nun Records) - "I Don't Want You Anyway"
- (1999) - Scarfies OST (Flying Nun Records) - "Cactus Cat"
- (2000) - But I Can Write Songs Okay (Yellow Eye Records) (EYE005-007) - "Ralta" (live version)
- (2012) - Time to Go: The Southern Psychedelic Moment 1981–86 (Flying Nun Records) (FNLP518) - "As Does The Sun"

=== DVDs ===
- (2004) - Second Season - Flying Nun DVD II (Flying Nun Records) (FNDVD489) - "Circumspect Penelope"
- (2004) - Very Short Film (Flying Nun Records) - "Cactus Cat"
