= Scarfies =

- Theatrical release poster
- Directed by: Robert Sarkies
- Written by: Duncan Sarkies; Robert Sarkies
- Produced by: Lisa Chatfield
- Starring: Willa O'Neill; Neill Rea; Ashleigh Seagar; Taika Cohen; Charlie Bleakley; Jon Brazier; Mark Neilson
- Cinematography: Stephen Downes
- Edited by: Annie Collins
- Distributed by: Becker Entertainment
- Release date: 5 August 1999
- Running time: 100 minutes
- Country: New Zealand
- Language: English
- Budget: $2 million

Scarfies (released as Crime 101 in the United States) is a 1999 New Zealand black comedy film set in the southern university city of Dunedin. The film original title comes from the local nickname for university students, scarfie, so called because of the traditional blue and gold scarves worn by students during the city's cool winters in support of the Otago Rugby Football Union.

== Plot ==
Scarfies starts off as a light comedy centred on a group of five students who get together after moving into a flat that is seemingly abandoned, but still has the power on, making it a free but filthy accommodation.

The inadvertent discovery of a large crop of marijuana being grown in the basement leads to euphoria among the students. Dreams of financial freedom among them overtake paranoia about the ethics and the risks, and the students foolishly sell the entire crop for $50,000 (as much as $200,000 less than it is worth). When Kevin, the crop's owner appears, the students fear for their lives and lock him in the basement. Events unfold against a backdrop of the city's biggest sporting event for years, the final of New Zealand's national rugby championship.

== Cast ==
- Willa O'Neill as Emma
- Neill Rea as Scott
- Ashleigh Seagar as Nicola
- Taika Cohen as Alex
- Charlie Bleakley as Graham
- Jon Brazier as Kevin
- Mark Neilson as Gordy
- Mark Henaghan as himself (cameo)

== Production ==
Despite the deliberate use of shots focusing on the city's dowdier and darker elements, much of the film's photography and soundtrack is an homage to the city, including the use of several Dunedin sound songs in the soundtrack (top local band The Clean even make a cameo appearance during the film).

The film initially had a small production budget of $250,000, but later received an additional $1.6 million in funding from the New Zealand Film Commission.

== Reception ==
Scarfies was well-received, described as "...the most outlandishly entertaining New Zealand film for years..." by The New Zealand Herald, and did well at the box-office.

== Soundtrack ==
1. Save My Life – Bike
2. Outer Space – 3Ds
3. George – Headless Chickens
4. Doledrums – The Chills
5. Let There Be Love – JPS Experience
6. Tally Ho – The Clean
7. Suck – Loves Ugly Children
8. Cactus Cat – Look Blue Go Purple
9. Gaze – Bike
10. Randolph's Going Home – Shayne Carter and Peter Jefferies
11. Death and the Maiden – The Verlaines
12. She Speeds – Straitjacket Fits
13. Grey Parade – JPS Experience
