= Willa O'Neill =

New Zealand actress

- Born: New Zealand
- Occupation: Actress
- Years active: 1990–2015

Willa O'Neill is an actress from New Zealand.

== Biography ==
O'Neill is a two-time Film Award winner at the New Zealand Film and TV Awards. Her first award, for Best Supporting Actress, came for her role in the 1997 film Topless Women Talk About Their Lives. Her second win was for Best Actress in the 1999 film Scarfies. She appeared in Hercules: The Legendary Journeys as Althea and in Xena: Warrior Princess as Lila.

After her final film appearance in The Price of Milk, O'Neill settled down into marriage and family life.

== Filmography ==
=== Film ===
| Year | Title | Role | Notes |
|---|---|---|---|
| 1990 | An Angel at My Table | Edith | |
| 1992 | Secrets | Vicki | |
| 1997 | The Bar | | Short film |
| 1997 | Topless Women Talk About Their Lives | Prue | |
| 1999 | Scarfies | Emma | |
| 2000 | The Price of Milk | Drosophila | |
| 2015 | The December Shipment | Karen | Short film, post-production |

=== Television ===
| Year | Title | Role | Notes |
|---|---|---|---|
| 1990 | The New Adventures of Black Beauty | Willa | "Hope" |
| 1992 | The Billy T James Show | Nadine | TV series |
| 1992–1993 | Shortland Street | Serena Hughes | Recurring role |
| 1995 | Melody Rules | | "Gullible's Travels" |
| 1995 | High Tide | Trudy Carry | "La Bamba" |
| 1995–2000 | Xena: Warrior Princess | Lila | Recurring role |
| 1996 | Hercules: The Legendary Journeys | Phoebe | "Once a Hero", "The Wedding of Alcmene" |
| 1997 | Hercules: The Legendary Journeys | Althea | "...And Fancy Free" |
| 1998 | The Chosen | Eileen O'Connor | TV film |
| 1999 | Hercules: The Legendary Journeys | Althea | "Greece Is Burning" |
| 2014 | Step Dave | Anne-Marie | "Crowded House" |

== Awards ==
=== Wins ===
2000
AFI Award, for Scarfies
1997
NZ Film and TV Award, for Topless Women Talk About Their Lives

=== Nominations ===
1992
NZ Film and TV Award, for Secrets
