= Store in a Cool Place =

Studio album by Able Tasmans
- Released: 1995
- Recorded: March 1995 at Port-a-fish, Park House, Unitech (Auckland, New Zealand)
- Genre: Indie pop
- Length: 66:29
- Label: Flying Nun

Able Tasmans chronology
Somebody Ate My Planet (1992)	Store in a Cool Place (1995)	Songs from the Departure Lounge (1998)

Store in a Cool Place is an album by the New Zealand band Able Tasmans, released in 1995.

== Critical reception ==
Professional ratings
Review scores
Source	Rating
Entertainment Weekly	A

Trouser Press wrote that "if you can get past the excess baggage ... the remaining tunes are among the quintet's best, with [Peter] Keen characteristically burying a few of his sharpest emotional daggers amidst some of the more outwardly placid tracks." Entertainment Weekly stated: "What could have been derivative is, instead, a glorious sonic whirlwind—one of the most bewitching rock albums of the year." The Dominion opined that "a lot of the songs are disappointing and heavy with a circus-like atmosphere."

== Track listing ==
1. "That's Why"
2. "Giant"
3. "Simple"
4. "The Professional"
5. "My Name is Peter Keen"
6. "GG 300"
7. "The Wind Changed"
8. "Dog Whelk 2"
9. "Orenthal's Face"
10. "Ladies & Gentlemen"
11. "Mary Tyler Moore"
12. "Home on the Range"
13. "The Klingon National Anthem"
14. "Parallax"
