= Under the Influence – 21 Years of Flying Nun Records =

Studio album by Various artists
- Released: May 16, 2002 (New Zealand)
- Recorded: 22 March 2002
- Genre: Indie rock
- Producer: Malcolm Welsford

Professional ratings
Review scores
Source	Rating
AllMusic	4/5 stars

Under the Influence — 21 Years of Flying Nun Records is a double album that includes tracks by various bands signed or related to the Flying Nun Records label.

The album was planned as a celebration of the 21st anniversary of Flying Nun Records. Bands invited to be part of the album were asked to record one or two songs; if two songs, then one should be a cover of a Flying Nun song that influenced or inspired them and the other song should be a new and unreleased song of their own. These were all to be recorded on a single day at York Street Studio on 22 March 2002.

== Track listing ==
=== CD1 ===
1. "Crazy I Know" – Gerling
2. "Japanese Girls" – Pan Am
3. "Outer Space" – Betchadupa
4. "Gentle Hour" – The Clean
5. "Heavenly Pop Hit" – Garageland
6. "Unnecessary Evil" – The Hasselhoff Experiment
7. "Joe 90" – The D4
8. "Death and the Maiden" – Stephen Malkmus
9. "If I Were You" – Tall Dwarfs
10. "Inner Silenced" – HDU with Shayne Carter

=== CD2 ===
1. "Friday in the Ground" – Chris Knox
2. "Get Loose" – The D4
3. "Saskatchewan" – Pan Am
4. "Graduation of Frustration" – Garageland
5. "Bad Food and Long Drives" – Betchadupa
6. "Brain That Wouldn't Die" – The Hasselhoff Experiment
7. "Man on the Verge of a Nervous Breakdown" – HDU with Shayne Carter
8. "Same Old New World" – Graeme Downes
9. "Corridor" – The Clean

== Photography and film ==
The recording session also resulted in a number of spin-off works:

- A photographic exhibition by photographer Fraser Harding
- A feature-length documentary Heavenly Pop Hits
- A music video of Stephen Malkmus' rendition of The Verlaines' "Death and the Maiden"
