= Songs from the Departure Lounge =

Song from the Departure Lounge

Greatest hits album by Able Tasmans
- Released: 1998
- Label: Flying Nun Records

Able Tasmans chronology
Store in a Cool Place (1995)	Song from the Departure Lounge (1998)

Professional ratings
Review scores
Source	Rating
Allmusic	4/5 stars

Songs from the Departure Lounge is a compilation album by New Zealand band Able Tasmans released in 1998.

== Track listing ==
1. "What Was That Thing"
2. "Sour Queen"
3. "Buffaloes"
4. "Michael's"
5. "Hold Me I"
6. "Grey Lynn"
7. "Michael Fay"
8. "Angry Martyr"
9. "Dileen"
10. "Theory of Continual Disappointment"
11. "Fault in the Frog"
12. "The Cliff"
13. "School Is No Good For You"
14. "Not Fair"
15. "Coming Up For Air"
16. "Shape of Dolls"
17. "That's Why"
18. "Dog Whelk 2"
19. "Mary Tyler Moore"
20. "My Name Is Peter Keen"
