= Marylebone Cricket Club in New Zealand in 1960–61 =

International cricket tour

An English team raised by the Marylebone Cricket Club (MCC) toured New Zealand between December 1960 and March 1961 to play four first-class matches against New Zealand. MCC also played against each of the main provincial teams – Auckland, Central Districts, Northern Districts, Canterbury, Otago and Wellington – and 12 matches against minor association teams.

The MCC team was captained by Dennis Silk and included Willie Watson, Eric Russell, Doug Padgett, Don Wilson, Roger Prideaux, Bob Barber, Jim Parks, John Murray, David Allen and David Larter. The manager was the experienced New Zealand official Jack Phillipps. To save money, team members were billeted throughout the tour.

== Bibliography ==
- Wisden Cricketers' Almanack 1962, Sporting Handbooks, London, 1962, pp. 864–877
- Don Neely & Richard Payne, Men in White: The History of New Zealand International Cricket, 1894–1985, Moa, Auckland, 1986, pp. 299–302
- "M.C.C. in New Zealand", The Cricketer, Spring Annual 1961, pp. 28–37
