= Secrets (1992 Australian film) =

- Alternate title Do You Want to Know a Secret?
- Directed by: Michael Pattinson
- Written by: Jan Sardi
- Produced by: Michael Pattinson
- Starring: Dannii Minogue; Noah Taylor; Willa O'Neill; Malcolm Kennard; Beth Champion
- Cinematography: David Connell
- Edited by: Peter Carrodus
- Music by: The Beatles
- Production company: Avalon Studios New Zealand
- Distributed by: Victorian International Pictures
- Release date: 3 December 1992
- Running time: 92 minutes
- Countries: Australia and New Zealand co-production
- Language: English
- Box office: A$215,188 (Australia)

Secrets (also titled One Crazy Night / Do You Want to Know a Secret?) is a 1992 Australian film, directed by Michael Pattinson, and starring Dannii Minogue (in her feature film debut) and Noah Taylor. The film follows four of the Beatles' biggest fans (and an Elvis Presley fan who hates the Beatles), who are trying to gain access to the band, and entry to their concert, eventually finding themselves locked up in the basement of the hotel where the Beatles are staying during their tour. While waiting for rescue, they start to share their deepest secrets with each other. The film has notable similarities to The Breakfast Club, in terms of plot, style, and characters.

The film's soundtrack consisted of instrumental renditions of many Beatles songs. However, the movie attracted criticism for including a number of songs from much later periods of the Beatles' history to the one being portrayed onscreen. Thus, scenes depicting 1964 Beatlemania were played against songs from later albums such as Abbey Road and Sgt. Pepper's Lonely Hearts Club Band, which many viewers felt did not fit with the tone of the film.

Willa O'Neill was nominated for the Australian Film Institute Award for Best Supporting Actress for her performance.

== Cast ==
- Dannii Minogue as Didi
- Noah Taylor as Randolph
- Willa O'Neill as Vicki
- Malcolm Kennard as Danny
- Beth Champion as Emily
