= Brave Words =

Studio album by the Chills
- Released: 1987
- Recorded: June 23, 1987 – July 27, 1987
- Studios: Point, Belgravia, London, England
- Genre: Jangle pop
- Label: Flying Nun FN090

The Chills chronology
Kaleidoscope World (1986)	Brave Words (1987)	Submarine Bells (1990)

Brave Words is the debut studio album by New Zealand band the Chills, released in 1987. It was produced by Mayo Thompson.

== Background ==
After the break-up of the Same, vocalist and guitarist Martin Phillipps started a new band, the Chills, in Dunedin in 1980. Over the next few years, they would go through extensive line-up changes, with the public believing that the Chills are solely a backing band for Phillipps, as he was the only constant member. "Pink Frost", recorded two years earlier, was released in 1984 and became a hit in New Zealand, followed by The Lost EP (1985), which reached number 31 on the UK Independent Chart. They played a few shows in London, England towards the end of 1985, and by October 1986, the line-up shifted again: Phillipps, Justin Harwood of Coconut Rough on bass, Caroline Easther of the Verlaines on drums and Andrew Todd of Smart Russians on keyboard. The Chills recorded another single, "I Love My Leather Jacket", reaching number 25 on the UK Independent Singles Chart and number four in New Zealand. Spurred on by this, the band moved to London in February 1987, prior to a five-week trek across Europe. After returning to London, they began working with Mayo Thompson of Red Krayola on their debut studio album, Brave Words.

== Release ==
To promote Brave Words, the Chills appeared at the Glastonbury Festival in June 1987, performing to over 60,000 people. Two months after this, they went to New York City to play at the New Music Seminar, and when they returned to London, embarked on tours of the UK and mainland Europe. Following a John Peel radio session, "House with 100 Rooms" was released as a single. In November 1987, they went on tours of Australia and New Zealand, both of which sold out. In the New Years, Easther left the band, citing issues with her ears. Her role was filled by James Stephenson, formerly of Bygone Era; his first tour saw the band tour across the US.

== Critical reception ==
Professional ratings
Review scores
Source	Rating
AllMusic	4/5 stars
Alternative Rock	6/10
Robert Christgau	A−
The Philadelphia Inquirer	3/4 stars

The Toronto Star wrote that "songs such as 'Push' and 'Wet Blanket' derive most of their power from the clever spins that [Martin] Phillips puts on typical romantic dilemmas." Author Dave Thompson, in his book Alternative Rock (2000), wrote that after "so many killer singles and EPs ... the first full blast of the Chills was disappointing", though adding that "Wet Blanket" and "16 Heart Throbs" could "dignify any best-of the band."

== Track listing ==
All songs written by Martin Phillips, except for where noted.

LP version
Side 1:

1. "Push"
2. "Rain"
3. "Speak for Yourself"
4. "Look for the Good in Others and They'll See the Good in You"
5. "Wet Blanket"
6. "Ghosts"

Side 2:

1. "Dan Destiny and the Silver Dawn"
2. "Night of Chill Blue"
3. "16 Heart-Throbs"
4. "Brave Words"
5. "Dark Carnival"
6. "Creep" (Phillips, Idaho)

CD version

1. "Push"
2. "Rain"
3. "Speak for Yourself"
4. "Look for the Good in Others and They'll See the Good in You"
5. "Wet Blanket"
6. "Ghosts"
7. "House With 100 Rooms"
8. "Party in My Heart"
9. "Living in a Jungle"
10. "Dan Destiny and the Silver Dawn"
11. "Night of Chill Blue"
12. "16 Heart-Throbs"
13. "Brave Words"
14. "Dark Carnival"
15. "Creep"
