= Some Disenchanted Evening =

Studio album by the Verlaines
- Released: 1990
- Label: Flying Nun

The Verlaines chronology
Juvenilia (1987)	Some Disenchanted Evening (1990)	Ready To Fly (1991)

Some Disenchanted Evening is an album by the Verlaines. It was released in 1990 on Flying Nun Records.

== Critical reception ==
Professional ratings
Review scores
Source	Rating
AllMusic	4/5 stars
The Encyclopedia of Popular Music	2/5 stars

Trouser Press wrote that "the album’s coda, a piano ballad styled after Randy Newman, is actually the collection’s crowning achievement; harnessing a dapper melody to a bitterly sardonic lyric about failure, it reveals new-found subtlety and clarity in [Graeme] Downes’ writing." The New York Times called the album "full of complex melodic variations, crescendos and elegant tempo shifts; the music has the theatrical grandeur of a symphony within the confines of rock."

== Track listing ==
All songs written by Graeme Downes, except where noted.

1. "Jesus What a Jerk" - 2:37
2. "The Funniest Thing" - 3:14
3. "Whatever You Run Into" - 3:18
4. "Faithfully Yours" - 3:43
5. "Damn Shame" - 5:02
6. "This Train" - 4:20
7. "Down the Road" - 3:13
8. "We're All Gonna Die" - 3:06
9. "Anniversary" - 4:20
10. "Come Sunday" - 4:01
11. "It Was" - 2:27
