= Pan Am (band) =

Pan Am was an alternative rock band from Auckland, New Zealand.

The band was formed in 2000 by Paul Barrett and Cole Goodley, who were friends from their school days at Avondale College in Auckland, New Zealand.

They released an EP, New Concepts in Sound Recording in May 2002 and a self-titled Album Pan Am in August 2003, both with Flying Nun Records/Festival Mushroom records NZ.

The band also contributed two songs to the Under the Influence – 21 Years of Flying Nun Records album and featured on the compilation albums The Locals soundtrack and Speed of Sound — a Flying Nun Compilation.

The band toured alongside The D4 and Betchadupa in 2002 for the Flying Nun Records 21st Birthday 'Under the Influence' Tour and also played the Big Day Out in Auckland in 2003.

== Members ==
Singer/guitarist Paul Barrett, Drummer Cole Goodley, bass player Jarrod Ross.

== Critical response ==
The band's album Pan Am received a 5-star review from Russell Baillie in The New Zealand Herald on its release in 2003. The album was included on The New Zealand Herald list of best albums of the year 2003.

The EP New Concepts in Sound Recording also received strong reviews and was nominated for Best Pop/Rock Release at the 2002 B.Net Music Awards. The low-fi quality of the recordings on the EP received particular critical praise.

The EP made it into the top 40 singles in New Zealand in the week of its release in 2002. The Album made it into the top 40 albums in New Zealand the week of its release in 2003.

== Australian release ==
In mid-2004, with a new four-piece line-up, the band re-located to Melbourne, Australia, to support the release of an Australian version of the album.

Although the band's live shows in Melbourne received good reviews in the Australian street press, the album was largely unsupported by Festival Records Australia, and the band eventually returned to NZ - although the Warner Music/Festival merger meant the band and the NZ label parted ways in 2005, and the band broke up without any public announcement.

Warner Music NZ currently own the worldwide rights to the Pan Am back catalogue, although the band has no current deal with the label.

The band's music continues to sell internationally on iTunes, especially in Europe and Japan.
