= Hey Spinner! =

Studio album by Able Tasmans
- Released: 10 September 1990
- Recorded: ???
- Genre: Indie rock, indie pop
- Length: 39:40
- Label: Flying Nun Records

Able Tasmans chronology
A Cuppa Tea and a Lie Down (1987)	Hey Spinner! (1990)	Somebody Ate My Planet (1992)

Professional ratings
Review scores
Source	Rating
AllMusic	3/5 stars

Hey Spinner! is an album by New Zealand band Able Tasmans. It was released in 1990.

== Reception ==
Trouser Press called the album "one of the finest records ever to emerge from New Zealand." Marc Horton, in Perfect Sound Forever, wrote that it "combines chamber pop with Fairport-style pastoral underpinnings and just enough of the Dunedin jangle to get them through customs without any trouble."

== Track listing ==
1. "Dileen"
2. "Angry Martyr"
3. "Hold Me I"
4. "Michael Fay"
5. "Hold Me II"
6. "Wednesday (she's coming round)"
7. "Patience"
8. "The theory of continual disappointment"
9. "Grey Lynn"
10. "Hey, Spinner!"
11. "Amelia"
