= Kaleidoscope World (The Chills album) =

Compilation album by The Chills
- Released: February 1986
- Labels: Creation Records, Flying Nun Records

The Chills chronology
The Lost EP (1985)	Kaleidoscope World (1986)	Brave Words (1987)

Professional ratings
Review scores
Source	Rating
AllMusic	4.5/5 stars
Melody Maker	(favourable)
New Musical Express	7/10
Underground	(favourable)
Vancouver Sun	(favourable)
Washington Post	(mixed)

Kaleidoscope World is a compilation album by New Zealand group The Chills, released in 1986 on Flying Nun Records in New Zealand and on Creation Records in the UK. The album was a compilation of early singles, plus all the Chills' tracks which featured on the Dunedin Double EP and The Lost EP. It was reissued in 1987 by Flying Nun with a bonus 7-inch single, "I'll Only See You Alone Again"/"Green Eyed Owl". It was re-released again in 2016 by Flying Nun and Captured Tracks with a further seven bonus tracks.

== Track listing ==
Original 12" vinyl release on Flying Nun Records.

Side A

1. "Rolling Moon" - 3:50
2. "Pink Frost" - 3:57
3. "Hidden Bay" - 1:30
4. "Satin Doll" - 4:23

Side B

1. "Doledrums" - 3:06
2. "Kaleidoscope World" - 3:40
3. "Purple Girl" - 3:23
4. "Flame-Thrower" - 3:15

Re-release CD on Flying Nun Records – FNE 13CD in 1989.

1. "Kaleidoscope World" - 03:40
2. "Satin Doll" - 04:23
3. "Frantic Drift" - 04:12
4. "Rolling Moon" - 03:51
5. "Bite" - 02:32
6. "Flame Thrower" - 03:16
7. "Pink Frost" - 03:57
8. "Purple Girl" - 03:23
9. "This Is The Way" - 02:31
10. "Never Never Go" - 02:06
11. "Don't Even Know Her Name" - 01:51
12. "Bee Bah Bee Bah Bee Boe" - 02:44
13. "Whole Weird World" - 03:25
14. "Dream By Dream" - 05:20
15. "Doledrums" - 03:10
16. "Hidden Bay" - 01:44
17. "I Love My Leather Jacket" - 02:54
18. "The Great Escape" - 02:29

Re-release CD/2XLP/Digital on Flying Nun Records - FN567 in 2016

1. "Kaleidoscope World"
2. "Satin Doll"
3. "Frantic Drift"
4. "Rolling Moon"
5. "Bite"
6. "Flame Thrower"
7. "Pink Frost"
8. "Purple Girl"
9. "This Is The Way"
10. "Never Never Go"
11. "Don't Even Know Her Name"
12. "Bee Bah Bee Bah Bee Boe"
13. "Whole Weird World"
14. "Dream By Dream"
15. "Doledrums"
16. "Hidden Bay"
17. "I Love My Leather Jacket"
18. "The Great Escape"
19. "Oncoming Day" (Early Version)
20. "Dan Destiny and The Silver Dawn" (Unplugged)
21. "Martyns Doctor Told Me"
22. "I'll Only See You Alone Again"
23. "Green Eyed Owl" (Live)
24. "Smile From A Dead Dead Face" (Live)
