= The Skeptics =

Skeptics were a New Zealand industrial post-punk band from 1979 to 1990. They became notorious in 1987 for an unusually graphic music video entitled "AFFCO".

== Early recordings ==
Skeptics' first recording appeared in 1982 on The Furtive Four Three Piece Pack a 12" compilation EP which also featured The Bongos, The Dabs and The Prime Movers.

They toured New Zealand on the Furtive Records "Three Piece Pack" tour. The tour was to be followed by a five track EP, Pyronnists Selections which was to be released on Propeller Records, Furtive's parent label, but the master tape was stolen from the Propeller office and the EP was never released.

In 1983, Skeptics released the EP Chowder Over Wisconsin on Flying Nun Records.

From 1983 to 1984 they ran their own club, thanks to support from the City Council arts centre, in a former electrical warehouse in Palmerston North. They named the club Snailclamps after a chalk inscription they found in the warehouse, "C164 Snail Clamps". Initially the venue ran as an underage hangout but became a fully licensed venue not long after, until the band decided to pack up and relocate to Wellington.

A cassette named Skeptics Said was released on the now defunct Industrial Tapes label in 1984.

In 1985, the band released an LP, Ponds.

== Membership changes ==
By the time of the Ponds release, Robin Gauld had left the band. John Halvorsen (https://johnhalvorsen.bandcamp.com/) formerly of The Gordons (and later of Bailter Space), joined in his stead.

== AFFCO video controversy ==
In August 1987 Skeptics made a video for the Skeptics III track "AFFCO", named after the New Zealand meat processing company AFFCO. Directed by Stuart Page, the video was filmed in the Westfield Freezing Company and Kellax meat packers in Auckland and included graphic footage of lambs being slaughtered and cut up, contrasted with footage of lambs in a field. Singer David d'Ath also appeared wrapped in plastic cling film and fake blood.

Due to its graphic content, the video has rarely been broadcast on New Zealand television, but has been screened at various art exhibitions in New Zealand and at Film Archive screenings and is now freely available to watch online.

== Breakup ==
While working on yet another release,"Amalgam" in 1989, David D'Ath learned that he had leukaemia.

David D'Ath died on Tuesday, 4 September 1990. The band ceased immediately after.

"Amalgam" was finally released in November 1990. In the following years to come, unreleased Skeptics material began to surface as documents of their existence. The 10" single, "Sensible" which featured studio tracks created back in 1985, was launched in 1991. A full album version soon followed which featured further recordings from 1985 to 1990.

In 1992, a boxed-set of Skeptics recordings was produced which contained 'Skeptics III', 'Amalgam', 'Sensible' and a live three song recording EP 'If I Will I Can' taken from the last Skeptics gig in 1990 at the Gluepot in Auckland. Also accompanying the boxset was a 12-page booklet of lyrics and artwork by, and in memory of David D'Ath.

In 2013 the documentary film Sheen of Gold, directed by Simon Ogston, was released to critical acclaim. Reissues and previously unreleased recordings were released to coincide with the film.

== Discography ==
Date of Release	Title	Format	Label
1983	Chowder Over Wisconsin	EP	Flying Nun
1984	Skeptics Said (Said See Say)	Cassette	Industrial Tapes
1985	Ponds	LP	Flying Nun / Ulp
1987	Skeptics III	LP and CD	Flying Nun
1988	"AFFCO"	Music video	Brilliant Film Company
1990	Amalgam	LP and CD	Flying Nun
1991	"Sensible Shoes"	10"	Flying Nun
1992	Box Set: Skeptics III (remastered); Amalgam (remastered); Sensible; If I Will I Can; Lyrics and artwork by David D'Ath	CD	Flying Nun
1992	Sensible	CD	Flying Nun
1992	I Will If I Can	CD EP	Flying Nun

=== Various Artists ===
Date of Release	Title	Track	Label
1982	Three Piece Pack	"Last Orders"	Furtive
1988	In Love with These Times	"A.F.F.C.O."	Flying Nun
1991	Pink Flying Saucers Over The Southern Alps	"Sheen of Gold"	Flying Nun
