= Bird Dog (album) =

Studio album by the Verlaines
- Released: 1987
- Recorded: Aug 1986–Mar 1987
- Label: Flying Nun/Homestead

The Verlaines chronology
| Hallelujah All The Way Home (1985) | Bird Dog (1987) | Juvenilia (1987) |

Professional ratings
Review scores
| Source | Rating |
|---|---|
| AllMusic | 4.5/5 stars |

Bird Dog is an album by the Verlaines, released in 1987. The album is often considered to be the Verlaines' best, most introspective piece of work, with songs such as "Slow Sad Love Song," "Bird Dog," and "C.D., Jimmy, Jazz and Me" all appearing on You're Just Too Obscure for Me, the group's only compilation to span their entire career.

"Slow Sad Love Song" was the first song Graeme Downes ever wrote, in 1980, inspired by the suicide of a friend.

== Track listing ==
All songs written by Graeme Downes.

1. "Makes No Difference"
2. "You Forget Love"
3. "Take Good Care of It"
4. "Just Mum"
5. "Slow Sad Love Song"
6. "Only Dream Left"
7. "Dippy's Last Trip"
8. "Bird Dog"
9. "Icarus Missed"
10. "C.D., Jimmy, Jazz and Me"
