= Hallelujah All the Way Home =

Studio album by the Verlaines
- Released: 1985
- Recorded: Mascot, May–June 1985
- Label: Flying Nun/Homestead
- Producer: Phil Yule

The Verlaines chronology
Hallelujah All the Way Home (1985)	Bird Dog (1987)

Professional ratings
Review scores
Source	Rating
AllMusic	4/5 stars
PopMatters	8/10
The Washington Post	(mixed)

Hallelujah All the Way Home is the debut album by New Zealand group the Verlaines. First released in 1985 by Flying Nun Records, it was re-released by Homestead Records in 1989.

== Track listing ==
All songs written by Graeme Downes.

1. "It Was Raining"
2. "All Laid On"
3. "The Lady and the Lizard"
4. "Don't Send me Away"
5. "Lying in State"
6. "Phil Too?"
7. "For the Love of Ash Grey"
8. "The Ballad of Harry Noryb"

== Chart positions ==
Chart (1986)	Peak position
New Zealand Albums (RMNZ)	50
