= Mainly Spaniards =

Mainly Spaniards were a 1980s New Zealand pop group led by guitarist/singer Richard James, who released an early 45, That's what friends are for, on the Flying Nun label. A follow-up was recorded but never released after James moved to Auckland to work as a schoolteacher in late 1983. He went on to perform and record in The Pterodactyls and The Letter 5. In 2008, he formed The South Tonight with John Kelcher, late of Flying Nun band Sneaky Feelings, and with other Christchurch musicians.

A collected works compilation featuring remasters of their single, unreleased single, studio out take and live tracks was compiled and released by Failsafe Records in 2019. It contains liner notes and band history by drummer David Swift.

Origin: New Zealand Genres: Rock Pop

Years active: 1981-1983 Associated: The Pterodactyls, The Letter 5, The South Tonight

== Members ==
- Richard James: Guitar, Vocals
- Nick Strong: Bass, Vocals
- David Swift: Drums, 1981-2
- Tony Green: Drums, 1982-3
- Mike Jeffries: Lead Guitar, 1981-2

== Discography ==
- That’s What Your Friends Are For, 1981, FN014

Currently available on Flying Nun boxset FNCD500/1.

- The Absolute Truth, 2019, SAFE113DLX Failsafe Records

Collected works, includes single, unreleased single, out take and live tracks. Reissued on CD 2026.
