= The Tired Sun =

EP by Able Tasmans
- Released: 1985
- Genre: Rock
- Label: Flying Nun

Able Tasmans chronology
The Tired Sun (1985)	A Cuppa Tea and a Lie Down (1987)

The Tired Sun is the debut EP by New Zealand band Able Tasmans, released on Flying Nun Records in 1985.

== Track listing ==
Side A

1. Patrick's Mother
2. Rain in Tulsa
3. Tom Song

Side B

1. Snow White Chook
2. Nelson The Cat
3. Rhyme For Orange
