= Topless Women Talk About Their Lives =

1997 New Zealand film

- Directed by: Harry Sinclair
- Written by: Harry Sinclair
- Produced by: Harry Sinclair; Fiona Copland
- Starring: Danielle Cormack
- Edited by: David Coulson; Cushla Dillon
- Production companies: John Swimmer Productions; TV3
- Distributed by: New Zealand Film Commission
- Release date: 1997
- Country: New Zealand
- Language: English

Topless Women Talk About Their Lives is a 1997 New Zealand film about a group of twentysomething friends. It was based on a television series.

== Synopsis ==
After missing an abortion appointment, Liz resigns herself to motherhood, but her boyfriend, who is not the father, is not so keen. Meanwhile, Ant has made a documentary called Topless Women Talk About Their Lives.

== Cast ==
- Andrew Binns as Geoff
- Caitlin Bossley as Bryony's Flatmate
- Danielle Cormack as Liz
- Josephine Davison as Bryony
- Oliver Driver as Kerry
- Frances Edmond as Ant's Mum
- Peter Elliott as Gary
- Ian Hughes as Ant
- Shimpal Lelisi as Mike
- Stephen Lovatt as German Tourist
- Rose McIver as Sally
- Anita McNaught as Interviewer
- Ian Mune as Mr Mulvehill
- Willa O'Neill as Prue
- Andrew Robertt as Geoff
- Tania Simon as Mel
- Joel Tobeck as Neil

== Reviews ==
- Cinemanilla Film Fest-Philippines 2002
- Cannes 1997
- Summer School Film Festival-Czech Republic 2002
- New Zealand Film Festival NY-USA 2001

== Soundtrack ==
The soundtrack was released alongside the film by Flying Nun Records.
