= Ready to Fly (The Verlaines album) =

Studio album by the Verlaines
- Released: 1991
- Genre: Pop rock
- Label: Slash

The Verlaines chronology
Some Disenchanted Evening (1989)	Ready to Fly (1991)	Way Out Where (1993)

Ready to Fly is an album by the New Zealand band the Verlaines. It was released in 1991 by Slash Records. The album was recorded in Sydney, Australia.

It was re-pressed for the first time on Blue Jay Opaque coloured vinyl for Record Store Day 2026, with remastering by Frank Arkwright at Abbey Road Studios.

== Critical reception ==
Professional ratings
Review scores
Source	Rating
AllMusic	3/5 stars
Chicago Tribune	3.5/4 stars
The Indianapolis Star	3.5/4 stars

The Indianapolis Star noted that "it's reminiscent of the Beatles without being a Beatles ripoff, and many of the songs could be show music without losing any of their pop-rock atmosphere." The Toronto Star opined that "the songs off Ready to Fly prove the Verlaines have the power trio thing down, but it's still too concerned with tasteful rather than tasty." The Columbus Dispatch wrote that, "at its busiest and most dense, the album is still about guitars (electric and acoustic), melody, a killer hook."

== Track listing ==
All songs written by Graeme Downes.

1. "Gloom Junky" – 3:32
2. "Overdrawn" – 2:35
3. "Tremble" – 2:50
4. "Such as I" – 3:18
5. "Hurricane" – 2:25
6. "War in My Head" – 4:47
7. "Inside Out" – 2:29
8. "See You Tomorrow" – 3:36
9. "Hole in the Ground" – 3:31
10. "Ready to Fly" – 4:16
11. "Moonlight on Snow" – 4:02
12. "Hold On" – 3:28
