= You're Just Too Obscure for Me =

You're Just Too Obscure For Me

Greatest hits album by The Verlaines
- Released: 2003
- Label: Flying Nun Records

The Verlaines chronology
Over the Moon (1996)	You're Just Too Obscure For Me (2003)

Professional ratings
Review scores
Source	Rating
AllMusic	4.5/5 stars

You're Just Too Obscure for Me is a greatest hits album by New Zealand band The Verlaines, released in 2003 by Flying Nun Records.

== Track listing ==
1. "Pyromaniac"
2. "War in My Head"
3. "Joed Out"
4. "This Valentine"
5. "Lying in State"
6. "Hanging By Strands"
7. "Whatever You Run Into"
8. "Heavy 33"
9. "Jailhouse 4.00 a.m."
10. "Death & the Maiden"
11. "C.D. Jimmy Jazz & Me"
12. "Anniversary"
13. "Slow Sad Love Song"
14. "Doomsday"
15. "Bird Dog"
16. "Blanket Over the Sky"
17. "Ready to Fly"
18. "Ballad of Harry Noryb"
