= Over the Moon (The Verlaines album) =

Studio album by The Verlaines
- Released: 1997
- Recorded: 1996
- Label: Columbia
- Producer: Verlaines and Tex Houston

The Verlaines chronology
| Ready to Fly (The Verlaines album) (1991) | Over the Moon (1997) | You're Just Too Obscure for Me (2003) |

Over the Moon is a 1997 album by The Verlaines on Columbia Records. Unlike their previous records, this album was only released in New Zealand and is not well known to their international fans.

== Track listing ==
All songs written by Graeme Downes.

1. "Hanging by Strands" - 3:38
2. "Bonfire" - 3:13
3. "Sky-Blue Window" - 4:27
4. "Jailhouse 4.00am" - 4:00
5. "Feather Fell" - 3:33
6. "Perfect Day" - 4:09
7. "When I Fall" - 3:35
8. "Uncle Big Jaw's Late-Night Farewell" - 2:56
9. "Dunderhead" - 4:03
10. "Dawdling on the Bridge" - 3:29
11. "Writing on the Wall" - 3:39
12. "Reasons for Leaving" - 5:40
13. "Coming Back to You" - 4:05

== Personnel ==
- Graeme Downes - Guitars, vocals, keyboards, oboe, cheap shot cello, mixing
- Darren Stedman - Drums
- Russell Fleming - Bass
- Paul Winders - Guitars, backing vocals
- Stephen Small - Keyboards on "Perfect Day" and "Dawdling on the Bridge"
- Kerrie Winders - Backing vocals on "Reasons for Leaving" and "Dunderhead"
- Tex Houston - Production, engineer
- Nick Rowan - Mixing
- John Collie - photography

== Reviews ==
Professional ratings
Review scores
| Source | Rating |
|---|---|
| Allmusic | 2.5/5 stars |

- Review at Kiwitapes
- Review by Keith McLachlan at Twee Kitten
