= The Expendables (New Zealand band) =

The Expendables were a 1980s band based in Christchurch, New Zealand. Fronted by singer-songwriter/guitarist Jay Clarkson, the band grew out of her former bands, They Were Expendable and The Playthings, and released a single and album in 1984 on the Flying Nun label.

Clarkson was joined in The Expendables by Michael Kime (bass) and Robert Key (drums). Key was replaced by Chris Matthews in 1985, and Anthony Nevison was added as an extra guitarist, though the band did not survive beyond the end of that year. In 1986, Clarkson formed a new band, Breathing Cage, a band which also included Kime, as well as Graeme Jefferies, Maria Chiaroni, and Gary Sullivan.
