= Martin Phillipps =

New Zealand singer-songwriter and musician (1963–2024)

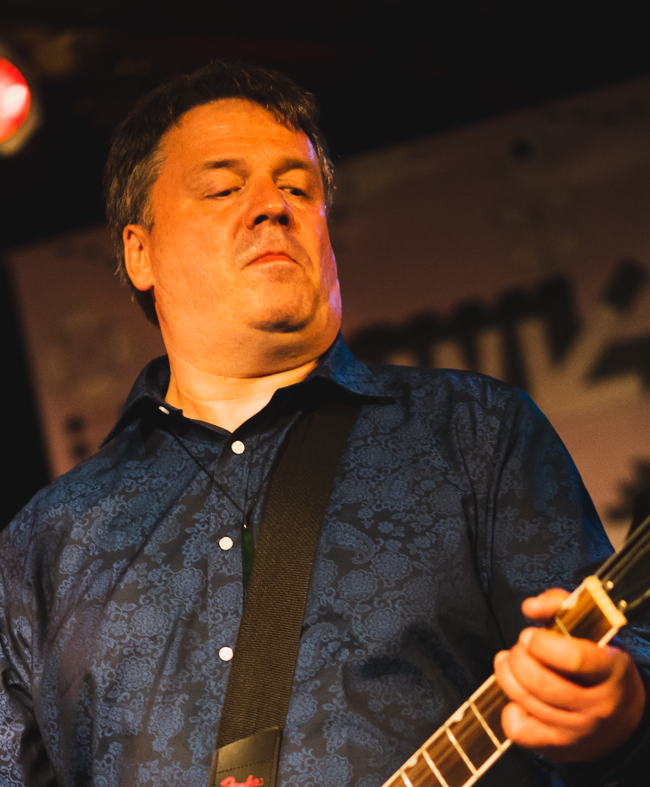
- Phillipps in 2019
- Born: Martin John James Phillipps; 2 July 1963; Wellington, New Zealand
- Died: 28 July 2024 (aged 61); Dunedin, New Zealand
- Occupations: Singer; musician; songwriter
- Relatives: Jack Phillipps (grandfather)
- Musical career
- Genres: Dunedin sound; indie rock; alternative rock; jangle pop; lo‑fi
- Years active: 1980–2024
- Labels: Flying Nun; Homestead; Creation; Slash; Fire
- Formerly of: The Chills; The Same

Martin John James Phillipps (2 July 1963 – 28 July 2024) was a New Zealand singer-songwriter and musician. He was the lead singer and rhythm guitarist for The Chills. As part of the Dunedin sound, Phillipps and the Chills helped lay the groundwork for modern indie rock, and the band's innovative approach to alternative rock and lo-fi formed his legacy. After he died suddenly in 2024, Split Enz and Crowded House frontman Neil Finn said Phillipps was a "true original, fascinated by and devoted to the magic and mystery of music".

== Early life ==
Phillipps was born in Wellington on 2 July 1963, to parents the Reverend Donald and Barbara (née Laurenson) Phillipps. He was the grandson of Jack Phillipps. Before the end of the decade the family had moved to Dunedin for the elder Phillipps' career as the chaplain of the University of Otago. He attended George Street Normal School in Dunedin North, and formed his first band, The Same, at Logan Park High School at the age of 15. Initially on guitar, he became its lead singer shortly after. His early musical influences included Nick Drake, Randy Newman, The Beach Boys, and other aspects of psychedelic music.

== Career ==
With his first band The Same, Phillipps began to play regular gigs as a teenager, beginning with the school ball at Logan Park. He then began supporting Chris Knox's band Toy Love, but mostly played covers before forming The Chills in 1980, aged 17, with high school friend Jane Dodd (also of The Verlaines). The Chills' initial line-up included his sister Rachel Phillipps on keyboards, former The Clean frontman Peter Gutteridge on guitar, Dodd on bass guitar, and Alan Haig on drums.

The band made their live performance debut in support of Bored Games at Dunedin's Coronation Hall on 15 November 1980; Gutteridge departed shortly thereafter. By June 1981, Dodd and Rachel Phillipps had also left, leaving the Chills on a brief hiatus. The band poached Terry Moore from Bored Games as their new bass guitarist, and then were joined by Fraser Batts, who played keyboard. In June 1982, they provided three tracks, "Kaleidoscope World", "Frantic Drift" and "Satin Doll", for a local various artists double-12" record, extended play, Dunedin Double via the Christchurch label Flying Nun Records, which marked their recording debut.

== Health issues and death ==
Phillipps's health and career was affected for much of his later life by hepatitis-C, which he likely caught as a result of a needlestick injury. He made successful efforts to quit drugs, and in the late 2010s he was cured of hepatitis. His health was permanently impaired, however. A feature-length documentary about Martin's health struggles and his music, The Chills: The Triumph and Tragedy of Martin Phillipps was directed by Julia Parnell and Rob Curry and released in 2019.

Phillipps was found dead at his home in Tainui, South Dunedin, on 28 July 2024. His funeral at Dunedin Town Hall was attended by hundreds of friends, fans, and family members, with the service led by former New Zealand Deputy Prime Minister Grant Robertson. His body was cremated after the service.
