= Dunedin Double (EP) =

EP (Double) by Flying Nun Records
- Released: June 1982
- Recorded: 1–18 March 1982
- Genre: Dunedin sound
- Length: 49:45
- Label: Flying Nun
- Producer: Doug Hood

Flying Nun Records chronology
Dunedin Double (1982)	Tuatara (1985)

The Dunedin Double EP is a 1982 compilation EP by The Chills, Sneaky Feelings, The Stones, and The Verlaines, released on the Christchurch label Flying Nun. An unusual format, it contained two 45 rpm 12-inch discs. At nearly 50 minutes length, it was longer than many compilations of the time period. The EP's release publicised Flying Nun as a major alternative record label for the first time. It has become regarded as one of the earliest seminal works of the Dunedin sound, which heavily influenced the development of indie rock.

Dunedin Double established the names of four of these groups, each of which was represented on the double EP by one side. The Chills' song 'Kaleidoscope World' in particular became very popular, gaining considerable airplay for the band. It later provided the title for the band's first album, a compilation of their early singles and EP tracks.

== Background and recording ==
The EP was conceived by Flying Nun founder Roger Shepherd in early 1982, alongside friend and musician Chris Knox of Toy Love. After seeing the Chills, led by lead singer Martin Phillipps, and the Verlaines perform at the Gladstone Hotel in Durham Street, Central Christchurch, Shepherd wanted to compile an album of Dunedin's up-and-coming bands, in the vein of Factory Records and their founder Tony Wilson. Shepherd, however, did not want to release a 7'' single, as he felt there was an overabundance of 7'' singles on the New Zealand music market at the time, pushing the value down. He asked The Stones to play shortly after; after being recommended by David Kilgour of The Clean, Shepherd picked Sneaky Feelings as the fourth band. Meanwhile, Chris Knox became actively involved on the album after leaving Christchurch for Auckland; he had initially desired to move to Australia but had stubbornly changed his mind. On a contemporary Flying Nun poster Knox had drawn, he had encouraged listeners to "discover REAL GOOD New Zealand (NO, repeat, NO relation to Australia – diametrically opposed, in fact) music".

Recording lasted from 1 to 18 March 1982 in Christchurch, with all four bands booking various gigs to cover their costs. Paul Kean, formerly of Toy Love, allowed the groups to record in his parents' spacious home in Longfellow Street; recording also unfolded in the kitchen of Flying Nun associate Jane Walker, and the bedrooms of local musicians Rex Vizables and Alec Bathgate. Contrary to popular belief, technician Doug Hood was the primary producer, not Chris Knox. Shepherd would later describe Knox's role as "[pointing] out any mistakes or potential improvements with the actual playing: tuning, timing and the like, as well as act as cheerleader, keeping everything going and to schedule", as opposed to monitoring the admittedly rudimentary recording equipment.

Released in June 1982, the compilation was a sign of the success to come for the newly formed Flying Nun Records label (catalogue number DUN-1), which over the course of the next ten years was to become the biggest independent record label in the South Island. Many of the label's top groups came from Dunedin, and established that southern city's music scene as the leading source of guitar-based bands in New Zealand throughout much of the decade. The bands from the city which had music released on Flying Nun were grouped under the loose banner of Dunedin sound, and several of them went on to not only national but also international success.

Though the sound quality of the Dunedin Double EP was distinctly lo-fi (it was recorded on portable 4-track by Chris Knox and Doug Hood), the release of this record provided a major impetus both for Flying Nun records and for the four bands involved, as well as providing inspiration and momentum to the music scene in Dunedin.

== Track listing ==
Poster advertising the compilation

=== EP 1 ===
Side 1
The Chills

1. "Kaleidoscope World"
2. "Satin Doll"
3. "(Frantic) Drift"

Side 2
Sneaky Feelings

1. "Pity's Sake"
2. "There's a Chance"
3. "Backroom"

=== EP 2 ===
Side 1
The Stones

1. "Down and Around"
2. "See Red"
3. "Something New"
4. "Surf's Up"

Side 2
The Verlaines

1. "Angela"
2. "Crisis After Crisis"
3. "You Cheat Yourself Of Everything That Moves"
