= Terry Moore (musician) =

- Born: Terence Moore; St Albans, England
- Occupations: Musician, record producer, recording engineer, audio engineering
- Instruments: Bass, guitar, singer, keyboards
- Years active: 1980–present

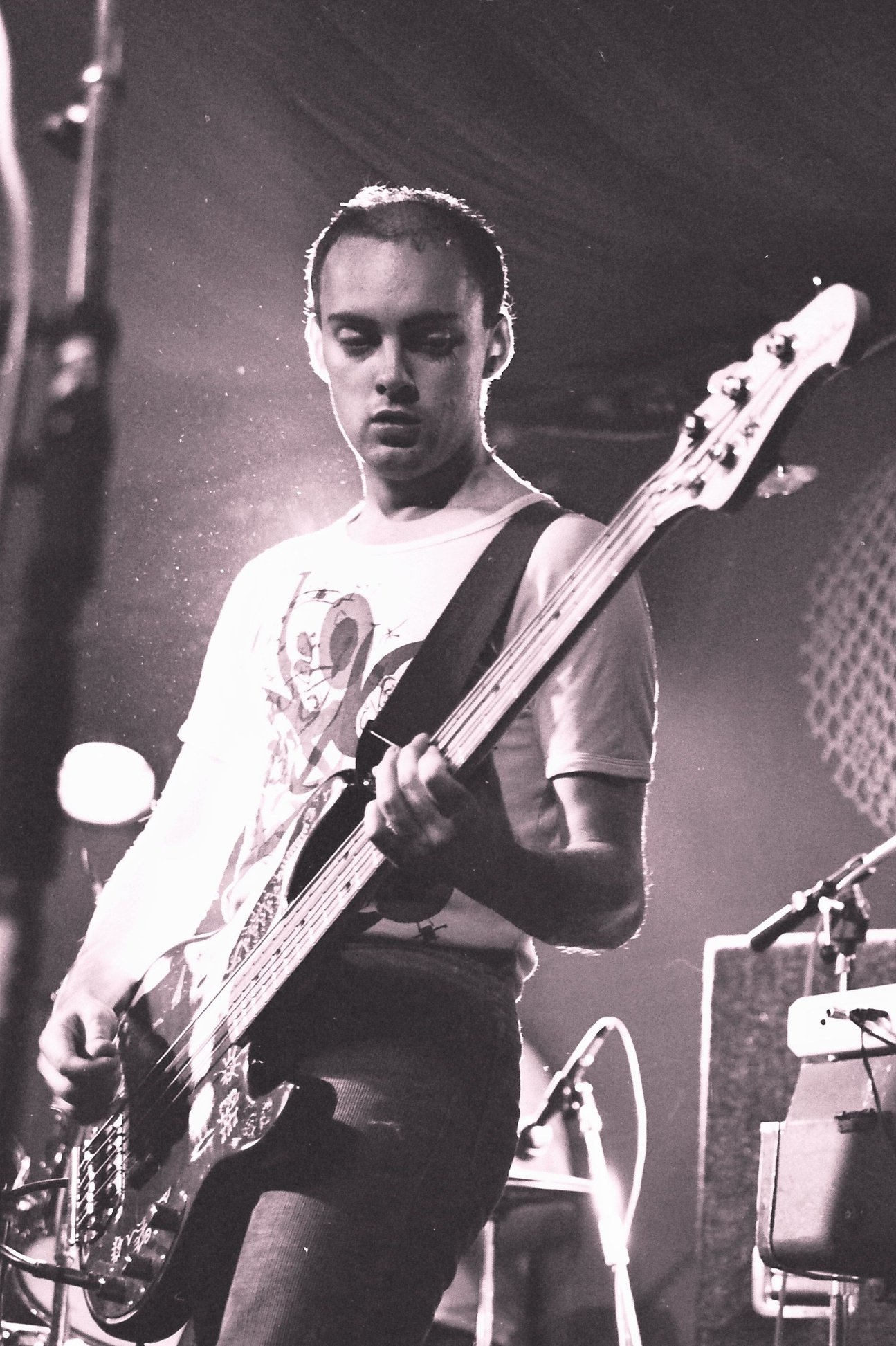

Terence Moore, known professionally as Terry Moore, is an English-born New Zealand musician, songwriter, record producer, recording and live sound engineer.

As a musician, he is best known as a former member of the Dunedin New Zealand band The Chills, for whom he played bass from 1981 to 1983, 1985–86 and again from 1991 to 1993. He was also notable as the bass player in the seminal Dunedin band Bored Games.

He also worked extensively and internationally, as a recording engineer, Record Producer and Live Sound Engineer, as well as being a collaborator and member of other bands, and is a notable photographer.

After extensive international tours as a sound engineer and tour manager for numerous artists, he left music professionally in the late-1990s to work in technology and finance. As of 2009 he was based in Brooklyn, NY.
