= The Verlaines =

New Zealand band from Dunedin

- Origin: Dunedin, New Zealand
- Genres: Post-punk, Dunedin sound
- Years active: 1981–present
- Members: Graeme Downes; Tom Healy; Darren Stedman; Stephen Small; Rob Burns
- Past members: Craig Easton; Philip Higham; Anita Pillai; Jane Dodd; Greg Kerr; Alan Haig; Caroline Easther; Robbie Yeats; Mike Stoodley; Paul Winders; Gregg Cairns; Russell Fleming; Stephen Cournane

The Verlaines are a New Zealand rock band from Dunedin. Formed in 1981 by Graeme Downes, Craig Easton, Anita Pillai, Phillip Higham and Greg Kerr, the band went through multiple line-ups. Formed at the beginning of the 'Dunedin sound' movement, The Verlaines were a key figure in the early history of Flying Nun Records and went on to release ten albums and two compilations.

== History ==
The band was named after French poet Paul Verlaine, and not, as is occasionally suggested, Tom Verlaine, who also took his stage name from the poet. "I had just been reading some of his poetry," Downes told Paul A. Harris in 1993, "and threw the name at the head of the row, and we thought it sounded cool." Their recorded debut was on the seminal Dunedin Double EP, which was released by Flying Nun Records and was the debut of several bands who would go on to be central to the mythology of the Dunedin sound.

The Verlaines are noted for their angular, "difficult" song structures, wordy and downbeat lyrics, unusual subject matter, all contained in often frantic up-tempo playing. The Verlaines are led by songwriter and vocalist/guitarist Graeme Downes, although many other New Zealand musicians played guitar, bass, drums and brass instruments during the different stages of the band. Downes was an academic at the University of Otago, where he had previously been the head of the Department of Music, until 2020 when he retired after a cancer diagnosis. He taught contemporary music and has research interests in Mahler and Shostakovich. He has released one solo album, Hammers and Anvils, which came out on Matador Records in 2001.

The group's signature songs include "Death and the Maiden", "C.D. Jimmy Jazz & Me", "Bird-dog" and "Ballad of Harry Noryb."

In 2003, a career retrospective, You're Just Too Obscure for Me, was released.

The Verlaines contributed the soundtrack to the film Eden, collaborating with actor Adetokunbo Adu, and screenwriter Rebecca Tansley. A song from Eden, "What Sound is This?" appeared on their album Untimely Meditations in 2012.

The band's latest studio album, Dunedin Spleen, was released exclusively via digital download in 2019. One year later, having been picked up by Schoolkids Records, an independent label out of North Carolina, it was released as a limited edition white vinyl, gatefold 2xLP on 24 October 2020, to coincide with Record Store Day. There were only 700 copies made available worldwide. On 4 June 2021, the album made its debut on compact disc for further consumption.

== Discography ==
Date of release	Title	Label	Charted	Certification	Catalog reference
Albums
1985	Hallelujah All the Way Home	Flying Nun/Homestead	-	-	FN040 / HMS138
1987	Bird Dog	Flying Nun/Homestead	-	-	FN077 / HMS095
1989	Some Disenchanted Evening	Flying Nun/Homestead	-	-	FN129 / HMS162
1991	Ready to Fly	Slash	-	-	C30718
1993	Way Out Where	Slash	-	-	D31032
1996	Over the Moon	Columbia	-	-	486880.2
2007	Pot Boiler	Flying Nun	-	-	FNCD501
2009	Corporate Moronic	Dunedinmusic.com	-	-	
2012	Untimely Meditations	Flying Nun	-	-	FNCD524
2020	Dunedin Spleen	Schoolkids Records	-	-	SMR-060
Compilations
1987	Juvenilia	Flying Nun	-	-	FN COMP 02
2003	You're Just Too Obscure for Me	Flying Nun	-	-	FNCD476
EPs
1981	Dunedin Double	Flying Nun	-	-	FN DUN1
1983	10 O'Clock in the Afternoon	Flying Nun	23	-	FN022

=== Featured appearances ===
The group have appeared on several compilations over the years in New Zealand and overseas.

- (1987) – Tuatara: A Flying Nun Compilation (Flying Nun Records) – "Death and the Maiden"
- (1988) – In Love With These Times (Flying Nun) – "Slow Sad Love Song"
- (1991) – Getting Older 1981-1991 (Flying Nun) – "Pyromaniac"
- (1991) – Pink Flying Saucers Over The Southern Alps (Flying Nun) – "The Funniest Thing"
- (1993) – No Alternative (Arista) – "Heavy 33", "Joed Out" (performed by Barbara Manning)
- (1995) – Red Hot + Bothered (Red Hot Organization) – "Some Fantasy" (with Shayne Carter)
- (1999) – Scarfies OST (Flying Nun) – "Death and the Maiden"

=== Singles ===
Year	Single	Album	NZ Singles Chart	Certification
1983	"Death and the Maiden"		-	-
1985	"Doomsday"		37	-
1990	"The Funniest Thing"	Some Disenchanted Evening	-	-
