= The Chills =

New Zealand rock band

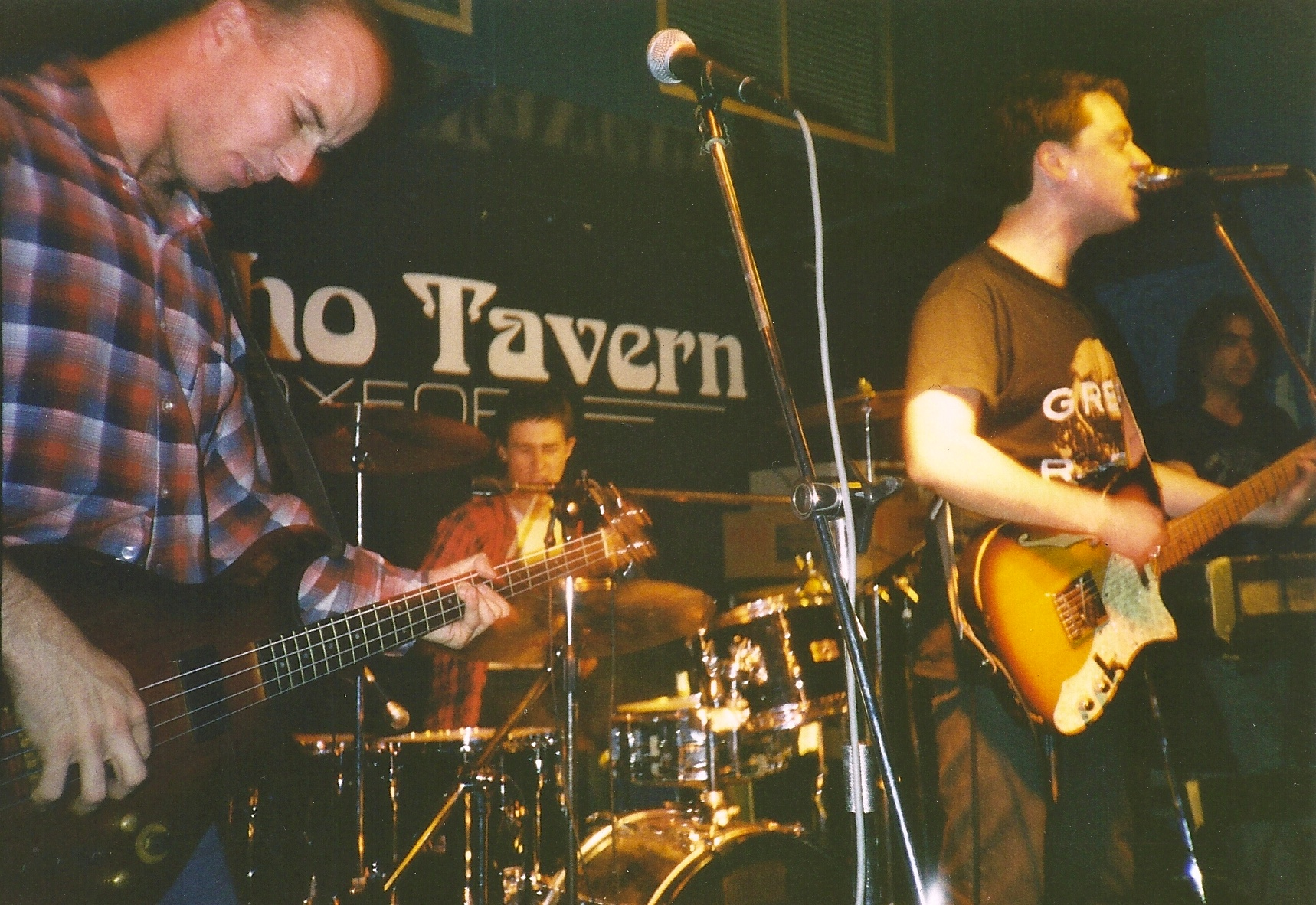
- The Chills (left to right): Justin Harwood, James Stephenson, Martin Phillipps, Andrew Todd, Oxford, United Kingdom, 1989

Background information
- Also known as: A Wrinkle in Time, Martin Phillipps and the Chills
- Origin: Dunedin, Otago, New Zealand
- Genres: Dunedin sound; jangle pop; indie pop; indie rock
- Years active: 1980–1983; 1984–1992; 1994–1996; 1999–present
- Labels: Flying Nun; Homestead; Creation; Slash; Fire
- Members: Todd Knudson; Erica Scally; Oli Wilson; Callum Hampton
- Past members: see Former members
- Website: thechills.band

The Chills are a New Zealand indie rock band that formed in Dunedin in 1980. The band were fronted by founding mainstay singer-songwriter, guitarist Martin Phillipps (2 July 1963 – 28 July 2024). During the mid-1990s they were billed as Martin Phillipps & the Chills. Their top ten studio albums in their homeland are Submarine Bells (1990), Soft Bomb (1992), Snow Bound (2018) and Scatterbrain (2021). The Chills were a cult band in other parts of the world as one of the earliest proponents of the Dunedin sound. Their top 20 singles are "Pink Frost", "Doledrums" (both 1984), "I Love My Leather Jacket" (1986), "Heavenly Pop Hit" (1990) and "Male Monster from the Id" (1992).

== History ==
=== Early years and first breakup (1980–1983) ===
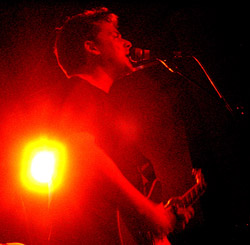
Founding mainstay Martin Phillipps on lead vocals and guitar, Wellington, March 2003

After the demise of the Same, one of the earliest punk rock bands in New Zealand, vocalist and guitarist Martin Phillipps started a new band, the Chills, in Dunedin in 1980. The Same had formed in 1978 with 15-year-old Phillipps on guitar before switching over to lead vocals. The Chills' initial line-up included his sister Rachel Phillipps on keyboards and former the Clean frontman Peter Gutteridge on guitar, Jane Dodd on bass guitar and Alan Haig on drums. Their first live performance was supporting Bored Games at Dunedin's Coronation Hall on 15 November 1980, after which Gutteridge departed. By June 1981, Dodd and Rachel Phillipps had also left, leaving the Chills on hiatus.

Martin Phillipps became an auxiliary member of the Clean, serving as their touring keyboardist and studio musician for their debut single "Tally Ho!" (1981). The Chills reconvened in July 1981 with Haig and Phillipps joined by Fraser Batts on keyboards and Terry Moore (ex-Bored Games) on bass guitar. They provided three tracks, "Kaleidoscope World", "Frantic Drift" and "Satin Doll", for a local various artists double-12" record, extended play, Dunedin Double (June 1982) via Flying Nun Records, marking their recording debut. Other artists on the release Sneaky Feelings, the Stones, and the Verlaines, also had three tracks each. The Chills issued a music video of "Kaleidoscope World".

Just before the EP's appearance, Haig left to join the Verlaines, he was replaced by Martyn Bull on drums. Rachel Phillipps temporarily returned after Batts departed, prior to a tour of the North Island with the Clean, though she did not stay for the whole tour. For the remaining dates they performed as a trio; which recorded two singles, "Rolling Moon" (1982) and "Pink Frost" (1984). Andrew Schmidt of AudioCulture described their debut single as "sunny, summery, upbeat". Their performances were paused when Bull was diagnosed with leukemia; the band worked whenever Bull's health allowed from October 1982 to early 1984. Peter Allison had joined on keyboards. In the meantime, Phillipps rehearsed with David Kilgour (of the Clean) in a group, Time Flies, though they never performed live. By June 1983, Haig re-joined the Chills on drums after Bull's leukemia became more severe; Martyn Stuart Bull died on 18 July 1983. The band went into hiatus again, although Phillipps played solo gigs until the end of 1983.

=== Reformation and international success (1983–1992) ===
By December 1983, they re-emerged under a new moniker, A Wrinkle in Time, with a line-up consisting of Allison, Haig, Phillipps and Martin Kean on bass guitar. The name change was temporary, reverting to the Chills by early the next year. They undertook a Flying Nun-sponsored Looney Tour alongside label mates Children's Hour, the Expendables and the DoubleHappys. Public perception developed that the Chills were a backing band for Phillipps – he was the sole mainstay throughout their line-up changes. "Pink Frost" (June 1984) reached the top 20 on New Zealand's singles chart. It was followed by another single, "Doledrums" (1984) and their six-track The Lost EP (1985). The former peaked at number 12, while the latter reached number four in New Zealand. The Lost EP peaked at number 31 on the UK Independent Chart. They played shows in London late in 1985. A compilation album, Kaleidoscope World, appeared in March 1986, comprising their early recordings, which reached number three on the UK Independent Albums Chart. By October 1986, the line-up shifted to Phillipps, Caroline Easther (the Verlaines) on drums, Justin Harwood (ex-Coconut Rough) on bass guitar and Andrew Todd (ex-Smart Russians) on keyboard.

Their next single, "I Love My Leather Jacket" (1986), reached number 25 on the UK Independent Singles Chart and number four in New Zealand. Spurred on by UK chart success, they relocated to London in February 1987, prior to a five-week tour across Europe. In London, they worked with Mayo Thompson (of Red Krayola) on their debut studio album, Brave Words (1987), which reached the top 30 in New Zealand. The band spent February through mid-December of that year promoting it by touring Europe, interspersed with four July dates in New York and Boston. A full North American tour occurred during 1988. In 1990, the band were signed to a worldwide record deal with Warner Brothers' imprint Slash Records in North America. Their second studio album Submarine Bells (1990) reached number one in New Zealand and provided their highest charting international single, "Heavenly Pop Hit". It reached number 17 on the Billboard Alternative Airplay Chart; it remains their only American chart appearance. Phillipps was joined by a new lineup of Mauro Ruby on drums, Lisa Mednick on keyboards and Steven Schayer on guitar and backing vocal for the group's third studio album, Soft Bomb (1992). It peaked at number three in New Zealand; while its lead single, "The Male Monster from the Id", reached the top ten.

=== Second reformation (1995–2024) ===
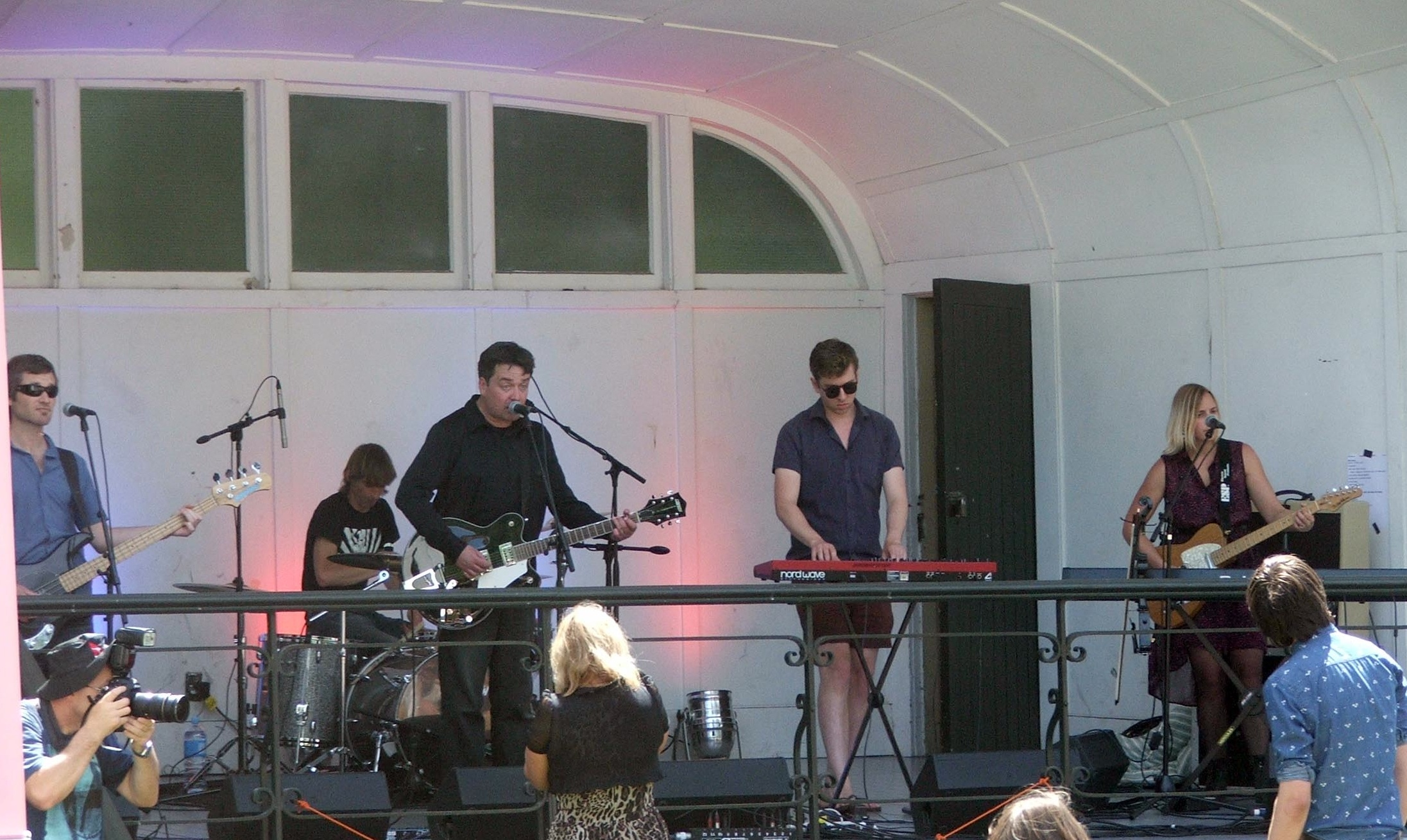
The Chills performing at a free concert in Dunedin Botanic Gardens, January 2013

Phillipps announced the disbandment of the Chills after the Soft Bomb Tour and joined Kilgour in a loosely organised 1960s covers band, the Pop Art Toasters, which released a self-titled EP in 1994. Shortly thereafter, that group broke up and Phillipps put together another the Chills lineup. The turnover of personnel is cited as a reason for the band's lack of consistent "saleability" and is referred to by local music press as "the Curse of the Chills". A documentary of the same name regarding the history of Phillipps and the Chills was broadcast in 2016.

The curse struck again with the recording of their fourth studio album Sunburnt in England, during August to September 1995. Two band members were refused entry into the UK, so Phillips recruited session musicians, Dave Mattacks (of Fairport Convention) and Dave Gregory (of XTC), who provided drum and bass guitar respectively. Guest keyboards were played by producer Craig Leon. It was issued in early 1996 under the name Martin Phillipps and the Chills.

The Chills split again with Phillipps joining another of Kilgour's bands, the Heavy Eights. Phillipps then recruited new the Chills members for live shows, which performed each year from 1997 on. During the late 1990s, Phillipps was incapacitated by hepatitis C infections, a side-effect of his drug addiction. He released a solo album of home demos, Sketch Book: Volume One, in 1999; it had been recorded from 1988 to 1995. In 2000, Secret Box, a triple-CD box-set of the Chills' live tracks, demos, radio sessions and rarities was released.

An eight-track the Chills EP, Stand By was issued in 2004, the first all-new material in nine years. Phillipps's liner notes promised: "I am preparing to take the band in quite a new direction on the next album. And on that we will begin work shortly." Despite that assurance, no new album appeared for over a decade. In May 2010 the Chills played two shows in Australia, their first outside New Zealand since 1996. Three years later, after another hiatus from recording, a lone the Chills track, "Molten Gold", was issued. It appeared on Phillipps' 50th birthday (2 July 2013) as a non-album single with a re-recording of "Pink Frost 13" as its B-side.

In October 2015 the Chills issued Silver Bullets, their first studio album in 19 years. In February 2017 they released a cover version of David Bowie's 1970 song "Conversation Piece". On 14 September 2018 they followed with their sixth studio album, Snow Bound. Scatterbrain, their seventh studio album, was issued in May 2021.

Phillipps died on 28 July 2024. A new album called Springboard: Early Unrecorded Songs was in progress at the time of his death. It was released on 28 February 2025.

=== The Chills on film ===
The Chills have been the subject of documentaries, predominantly produced for New Zealand TV. In March 2019, The Chills: The Triumph & Tragedy of Martin Phillipps, explored the history of the band and Phillipps' contemporary struggle with hepatitis C. The film was directed by Julia Parnell and Rob Curry, and premiered at SXSW before being released theatrically in New Zealand and Australia. It was subsequently broadcast in New Zealand on Prime TV.

== Members ==
=== Current ===
- Todd Knudson – drums (1999–present)
- Erica Scally – keyboards (2006–2010), violin (2010–present)
- Oli Wilson – keyboards (2010–present)
- Callum Hampton – bass guitar (2019–present)

=== Former ===
- Martin Phillipps – lead vocals, guitar (1980–1983, 1984–1992, 1994–1996, 1999–2024, died 2024)
- Jane Dodd – bass guitar (1980–1981)
- Peter Gutteridge – guitar (1980, died 2014)
- Alan Haig – drums (1980–1982, 1983, 1984–1986)
- Rachel Phillipps – keyboards (1980–1981, 1982)
- Fraser Batts – keyboards (1981–1982)
- Terry Moore – bass guitar (1981–1983, 1984–1986, 1990–1992)
- Martyn Bull – drums (1982, died 1983)
- Peter Allison – keyboards (1983–1986)
- David Kilgour – guitar (1983)
- Martin Kean – bass guitar (1983–1984)
- Justin Harwood – bass guitar (1986–1990)
- Caroline Easther – drums (1986–1988)
- James Stephenson – drums (1988–1991, died 2025)
- Steven Schayer – guitar (1992)
- James Dickson – keyboards (1999–2006), bass guitar (2006–2019)

== Discography ==
=== Studio albums ===
List of studio albums, with selected details and selected chart positions
Title	Details	Peak chart positions	
Title	Details	NZ	AUS
Brave Words	Released: 1987; Label: Flying Nun (FN090)	24	—
Submarine Bells	Released: 1 March 1990; Label: Slash/Liberation (L30342)	1	90
Soft Bomb	Released: 19 March 1992; Label: Slash/Liberation (L30782)	3	99
Sunburnt (by Martin Phillipps and the Chills)	Released: 12 June 1996; Label: Flying Nun (FN303)	25	—
Silver Bullets	Released: 23 October 2015; Label: Fire (FIRECD382)	12	—
Snow Bound	Released: 14 September 2018; Label: Fire (FIRECD530)	9	—
Scatterbrain	Released: 14 May 2021; Label: Fire (FIRECD581)	4	—
Spring Board: The Early Unrecorded Songs	Released: 28 February 2025; Label: Fire (FIRECD767)	7	—

=== Live albums ===
List of live albums with selected details
Title	Details
Somewhere Beautiful	Released: 28 March 2013; Label: Fire (FIRECD298)

=== Compilation albums ===
List of compilation albums, with selected details and selected chart positions
Title	Details	Peak chart positions	
Title	Details	NZ	AUS
Kaleidoscope World	Released: 7 March 1986; Label: Flying Nun (FN005)	19	—
Heavenly Pop Hits – The Best of The Chills	Released: 7 June 1994; Label: Flying Nun (FN306)	24	122
Secret Box – The Chills' Rarities, 1980–2000 (Limited private release only)	Released: 2000; Label: Definitive Music (DM001)	—	—
The BBC Sessions	Released: 2014; Label: Fire Records (FIRECD385)	—	—
"—" denotes a recording that did not chart or was not released in that territory.

=== Extended plays ===
List of extended plays, with selected details and selected chart positions
Title	Details	Peak chart positions
Title	Details	NZ
Dunedin Double (by the Chills, Sneaky Feelings, the Stones, the Verlaines)	Released: 7 November 1982; Label: Flying Nun (FNDUN01)	—
The Lost EP	Released: 7 January 1985; Label: Flying Nun (FNCOLD004)	4
Stand By (expanded to full album 2014)	Released: 28 June 2004; Label: Flying Nun (MPM001)	—
Pyramid/When the Poor Can Reach the Moon	Released: 2016; Labels: Fire Records, Far South Records (FIRE436EP)	—
"—" denotes a recording that did not chart or was not released in that territory.

=== Singles ===
List of singles, with selected chart positions, showing year released and album name
Title	Year	Peak chart positions				Album
Title	Year	NZ	AU	UK	US Alt	Album
"Rolling Moon"	1982	26	—	—	—	Kaleidoscope World
"Pink Frost"	1984	17	—	—	—	Kaleidoscope World
"Doledrums"	1984	12	—	—	—	Kaleidoscope World
"I'll Only See You Alone Again"	1986	—	—	—	—	Non-album single
"I Love My Leather Jacket"	1986	4	—	—	—	Kaleidoscope World
"House with a Hundred Rooms"	1987	—	—	—	—	Brave Words
"Wet Blanket"	1988	—	—	—	—	Brave Words
"Heavenly Pop Hit"	1990	2	118	97	17	Submarine Bells
"Part Past Part Fiction"	1990	—	—	—	—	Submarine Bells
"The Oncoming Day"	1990	—	—	—	—	Submarine Bells
"Male Monster from the Id"	1992	8	163	—	—	Soft Bomb
"Double Summer"	1992	—	180	—	—	Soft Bomb
"Come Home"	1995	33	—	—	—	Sunburnt
"Surrounded"	1996	—	—	—	—	Sunburnt
"Dreams Are Free"	1996	—	—	—	—	Sunburnt
"Molten Gold"	2013	—	—	—	—	Non-album single
"America Says Hello"	2015	—	—	—	—	Silver Bullets
"Warm Waveform"	2015	—	—	—	—	Silver Bullets
"When the Poor Can Reach the Moon"	2015	—	—	—	—	Silver Bullets
"Rocket Science"/"Lost in Space"	2016	—	—	—	—	Non-album single
"Conversation Piece"	2017	—	—	—	—	Non-album single
"Complex"	2018	—	—	—	—	Snow Bound
"Lord of All I Survey"	2018	—	—	—	—	Snow Bound
"Scarred"	2018	—	—	—	—	Snow Bound
"—" denotes a recording that did not chart or was not released in that territory.
