= Dunedin sound =

New Zealand early indie rock scene

- Other names: Dunedin rock; Dunedin pop
- Stylistic origins: Alternative rock; jangle pop; punk rock; post-punk; new wave; surf rock; garage rock; psychedelic pop; lo-fi
- Cultural origins: Early 1980s, Dunedin, New Zealand

Other topics
- Paisley Underground; Music of New Zealand

The Dunedin sound was a musical and cultural movement in Dunedin, Otago, New Zealand, in the early 1980s. It helped found indie rock as a genre. The scene is associated with Flying Nun Records, an independent label.

== Characteristics ==
According to Matthew Bannister, Dunedin sound "was typically marked by the use of droning or jangling guitars, indistinct vocals and often copious quantities of reverberation." Many Dunedin sound bands drew inspiration from punk rock, as well as pop, rock, and psychedelic music of the 1960s.

The origin of the Dunedin sound is often associated with the particular venues that the bands played at, such as the Empire Hotel and the Oriental Tavern.

== Influences ==
The Dunedin sound can be traced back to the emergence of punk rock as a musical influence in New Zealand in the late 1970s. Isolated from the country's main punk scene in Auckland (which had been influenced by bands such as England's Buzzcocks), Dunedin's punk groups, such as the Enemy (which became Toy Love) and the Same (which later developed into the Chills), developed a sound more heavily influenced by artists like the Velvet Underground and the Stooges. This was complemented by jangly, psychedelic-influenced guitar work reminiscent of 1960s bands such as the Beatles and the Byrds, and the combination of the two developed into the style which became known as the Dunedin sound. Some later Dunedin bands were also influenced by the post-punk and new wave act the Cure, particularly following the band's visits to New Zealand in 1981 and 1982, which further contributed to the development and diversification of the local sound. The Cure were managed by New Zealander Chris Parry, who played a role in fostering international connections for the band and is often associated with encouraging greater exposure of New Zealand music culture to overseas acts. Frontman Robert Smith has also been noted for his long-standing appreciation of the Dunedin sound scene, which helped reinforce mutual influence between the band and emerging New Zealand indie artists.

== Reception and legacy ==
New Zealand-based Flying Nun Records championed the Dunedin sound, starting with its earliest releases (including The Clean's single "Tally Ho!" and the four-band compilation Dunedin Double EP, from which the term "Dunedin sound" was first coined). Many artists gained a dedicated "college music" following, both at home and overseas. In July 2009, Uncut magazine suggested that "before the mp3 replaced the flexidisc, the three axes of the international indie-pop underground were Olympia [in Washington State] ... Glasgow, and Dunedin..." The growth of the Dunedin sound coincided with the founding of the student radio station Radio One at the University of Otago, helping to increase the popularity and availability of the music around the city. Christchurch student radio station RDU, popular in student flats at the time, was already playing plenty of Dunedin music as early as 1981, while commercial radio stations in New Zealand barely featured any "homegrown" music until a voluntary code was introduced in 2002.

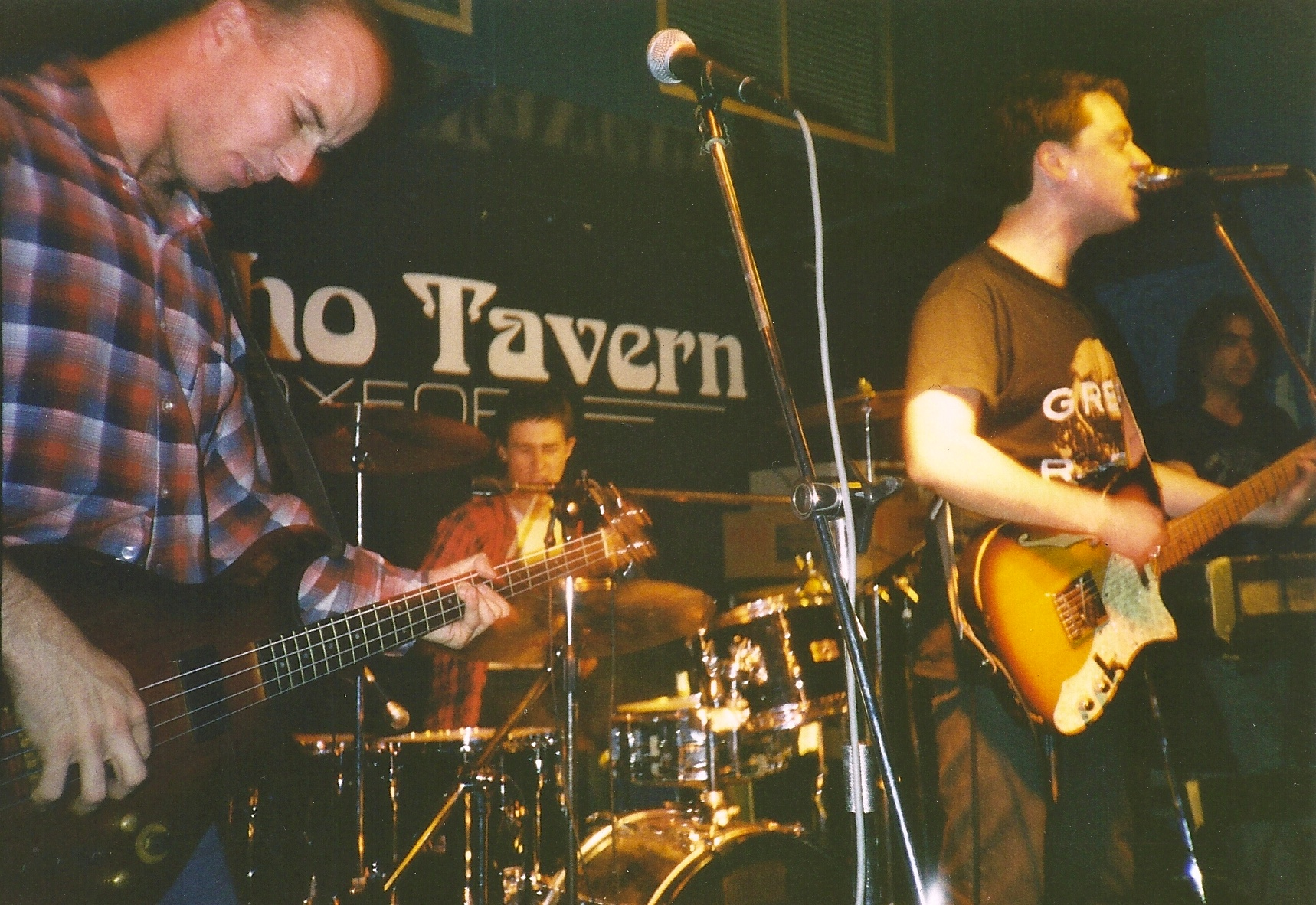
The Chills in 1989, promoting Brave Words

The development of parallel musical trends such as the Paisley Underground in California and the resurgence of jangle pop contributed to growth in the popularity of the Dunedin sound on college radio in the US and Europe. The heyday of the movement was in the mid-to-late 1980s, although music in the style is still being recorded and released.

Pavement, R.E.M., and Mudhoney cite the Dunedin sound as an influence, and other overseas artists, such as Superchunk, Barbara Manning, and Cat Power, have covered Dunedin sound songs on several occasions. Post-2000 a new batch of Australian bands, often referred to as Dolewave were heavily influenced by the Dunedin Sound.

The 1999 black comedy film Scarfies, set and filmed in Dunedin, features a soundtrack of Dunedin sound bands.

In 2000, a "Dunedin sound" showcase was presented as part of the Otago Festival of the Arts, held in Dunedin. This showcase featured performances by The Clean, The Chills, the Dead C, Alastair Galbraith, the Renderers, Snapper, and the Verlaines. KFJC 89.7 FM, an American college radio station based in Los Altos Hills, California, broadcast all six nights of the Dunedin sound showcase live to the San Francisco Bay Area via its FM signal and worldwide over the internet. The following year, a double CD documenting these broadcasts was produced for the station's annual fund-raiser.

== Sources and further reading ==
- Bannister, M. (1999) Positively George Street. Auckland: Reed Books. ISBN 0-7900-0704-5
- Bertram, G. "Great still sounds great", Otago Daily Times, 7 December 2013. Retrieved 17 April 2014.
- Chapman, I. (2016) The Dunedin Sound: Some disenchanted evening. Auckland: David Bateman Ltd ISBN 978-1-86953-895-8
- Davey, T. & Puschmann, H. (1996) Kiwi rock. Dunedin: Kiwi Rock Publications. ISBN 0-473-03718-1
- Dix, J. (1988) Stranded in paradise: New Zealand rock'n'roll 1955–1988. Wellington: Paradise Publications. ISBN 0-473-00638-3
- Eggleton, D. (2003) Ready to fly: The story of New Zealand rock music. Nelson, NZ: Craig Potton Publishing. ISBN 1-877333-06-9
- Higgins, M. (1982) The Clean and the Dunedin Sound. In Rip It Up magazine, April 1982.
- Flying Nun 25th anniversary edition of Real Groove magazine, 2006.
- Flying Nun: Anything can happen (Television New Zealand documentary, 1990)
- Heavenly pop hits: The Flying Nun story (Television New Zealand documentary, 2002)
