= Flying Nun Records =

New Zealand independent record label

- Founded: 1981
- Founder: Roger Shepherd
- Genre: Indie pop; indie rock; Dunedin sound
- Country of origin: New Zealand
- Location: Auckland
- Official website: www.flyingnun.co.nz

Flying Nun Records is a New Zealand independent record label formed in Christchurch in 1981 by music store manager Roger Shepherd. Described by The Guardian as "one of the world's great independent labels", Flying Nun is notable for bringing global attention to the Dunedin sound, a cultural and musical movement in early 1980s Dunedin.

== History ==
The label formed in the wake of a flurry of new post-punk-inspired labels appearing in New Zealand in the early 1980s, in particular Propeller Records in Auckland. Shepherd had intended to record the original local music of Christchurch, but soon the label rose to national prominence by championing the emerging music of Dunedin.

"Ambivalence" by The Pin Group (the first band of Roy Montgomery) was the first release from Flying Nun, although "Tally Ho" by The Clean was the first release to draw public attention to the label, as it unexpectedly reached number nineteen in the New Zealand charts, bringing the label unanticipated profile and income. There followed the seminal Dunedin Double, a release which cemented the place of the southern city in the forefront of New Zealand independent music. Flying Nun moved into the full-length album market in 1982 with the Ego Gratification Album by Chris Knox and Beatin Hearts by Builders (recorded 1982, Auckland).

Many of New Zealand's most prominent kiwi rock and alternative bands have signed to Flying Nun at some stage in their careers. In 2000 Australian youth radio network Triple J produced a list of the thirty "Greatest New Zealand acts of all time", twenty of them by Flying Nun artists. The label has been home to various styles of music, including the much-debated Dunedin sound, "high-end pop with a twist", lo-fi experimentation, strongly Velvet Underground-influenced pop, minimalism, industrial, and rock-electronic crossover.

In 1999 Matthew Bannister of The Sneaky Feelings wrote Positively George Street: A Personal History of the Sneaky Feelings and the Dunedin Sound, covering the New Zealand music industry of the 1980s, including Flying Nun.

In 1990 Festival Records bought a fifty-percent stake in Flying Nun, and then in 2000 merged it with Mushroom Records, bringing Flying Nun into the Festival-Mushroom Records family of companies. Warner Music Group acquired Flying Nun as part of its purchase of FMR (Festival Mushroom Records) in 2006. A consortium that included Shepherd bought back the label from Warner on 21 December 2009, for "more than what I sold it for". New Zealand musician Neil Finn, his wife Sharon, and another business partner together own a quarter-share in the repatriated record label.

In 2013, American label Captured Tracks announced plans for selected reissues of Flying Nun's back catalogue.

The label's history and daily workings of Flying Nun were extensively covered in Roger Shepherd's 2016 autobiography, In Love With These Times.

In the 2018 Queen's Birthday Honours Shepherd was appointed an Officer of the New Zealand Order of Merit (ONZM) for services to the music industry.

In the 2020s, Flying Nun ventured into retail with both an online store and physical locations selling records from their own artists alongside other albums on vinyl and CD. In 2022 they opened a record shop on Cuba Street in Wellington, and in 2023 they opened another retail store on Auckland's Karangahape Road.

In 2022, Canadian author Matthew Goody published Needles and Plastic: Flying Nun Records, 1981–1988, a comprehensive book charting the label's history, associated figures, and every release or band put out during its first seven years. The book took 10 years to write, and includes live photos, posters, artwork and other documentation.

== Roster, early 1980s to mid-1990s ==
- Able Tasmans
- The Axemen
- Bailter Space
- The Bats
- The Bilders
- Bird Nest Roys
- The Chills
- The Clean
- Crude
- The Dead C
- Dead Famous People
- The Expendables
- Exploding Budgies
- From Scratch
- Alastair Galbraith
- Goblin Mix
- The Gordons
- The Great Unwashed
- Headless Chickens
- Jean-Paul Sartre Experience
- David Kilgour
- Chris Knox
- Look Blue Go Purple
- Loves Ugly Children
- Mainly Spaniards
- Marching Orders
- The Max Block
- The Pin Group
- The Plastic Pegs
- The Puddle
- The Renderers
- Scorched Earth Policy
- The Skeptics
- Snapper (band)
- Sneaky Feelings
- The Stones
- Straitjacket Fits
- Tall Dwarfs
- The Terminals
- This Sporting Life
- 3Ds
- The Verlaines
- The Vibraslaps

== Roster, mid-1990s to present ==
Since the mid-1990s many of the original stable of artists have split up or moved to other labels, including Xpressway Records (Port Chalmers, New Zealand), Arch Hill Recordings (Auckland), Powertool Records (Auckland), South Indies, Paris or Matador Records (United States). A similarly varied new generation of bands is signed to Flying Nun, including:

- Aldous Harding
- Badd Energy
- Betchadupa
- Bressa Creeting Cake
- Cloudboy
- The Courtneys
- The D4 (formerly)
- DARTZ
- Die! Die! Die!
- Erny Belle
- Fazerdaze
- Garageland
- Gerling
- Ghost Club
- Grayson Gilmour
- HDU
- Mermaidens
- The Mint Chicks (formerly)
- Pan Am (formerly)
- Pavement
- The Phoenix Foundation
- Reb Fountain
- Recitals
- The Subliminals
- Vera Ellen
- Wax Chattels

== Compilations ==
Flying Nun also released numerous compilations of a cross-section of its artists. These are now often the only easy-to-find documents of certain featured artists.

- Tuatara (1985)
- In Love With These Times (1990)
- Roger Sings the Hits (1991)
- Getting Older 1981-1991 (1991)
- Pink Flying Saucers over the Southern Alps (1991)
- Shrewd: A Compilation of NZ Women's Music (1993)
- The Sound Is Out There (1995)
- Pop Eyed (1996)
- 15 – Flying Nun Records (1996)
- Topless Women Talk About Their Lives (film soundtrack) (1997)
- How Much For Trade? – 1998 Flying Nun Sampler (1998)
- Scarfies (film soundtrack) (1999)
- Under the Influence - 21 Years of Flying Nun Records (2002)
- Speed of Sound (2003)
- Very Short Films (music video compilation DVD) (2003)
- Second Season (music video compilation DVD) (2004)
- Where In The World Is Wendy Broccoli? (2006)
- Flying Nun 25th Anniversary Box Set (2006)
- Tally Ho!: Flying Nun's Greatest Bits (2011)
- Time To Go: The Southern Psychedelic Moment 1981-1986 (2012)

== See also ==
- List of record labels
- Music of New Zealand
- Dunedin sound
- Indie rock
