= The Clean discography =

- Studio albums: 5
- Extended plays: 4
- Live albums: 2
- Compilation albums: 3
- Singles: 3

New Zealand rock band The Clean have released five studio albums, two live albums, three compilation albums, five extended play records, and three singles. The band's first official release was their "Tally Ho!" single in 1981, released on the Flying Nun label.

== Albums ==
=== Studio albums ===
List of studio albums, with New Zealand chart positions
Title	Album details	Peak chart positions
Title	Album details	NZ
Vehicle	Released: August 1990; Label: Flying Nun Records (FN147); Format: LP, CD, Cassette	35
Modern Rock	Released: October 1994; Label: Flying Nun Records (FN292); Format: LP, CD, Cassette	41
Unknown Country	Released: 1996; Label: Flying Nun Records (FN349); Format: LP, CD, Cassette	39
Getaway	Released: 2001; Label: Flying Nun Records (FN459); Format: CD	-
Mister Pop	Released: 2009; Label: Arch Hill Recordings (AHR042); Format: CD, LP, DD	-

=== Live albums ===
List of live albums
Title	Album details
Syd's Pink Wiring System: Live in New Zealand 2000	Released: June 2003; Label: Cleano Records (cleano 0001); Format: CD; Note: Recorded in 2000
Mashed	Released: 2008; Label: Arch Hill Recordings (AHR033); Format: CD; Note: Recorded in March 2007

=== Compilation albums ===
List of compilation albums, with New Zealand chart positions
Title	Album details	Peak chart positions
Title	Album details	NZ
Compilation	Released: 1986; Label: Flying Nun Records (FN154); Format: LP, CD, Cassette	-
Anthology	Released: 2002; Label: Flying Nun Records (FN468); Format: 2xCD	33

=== Demo albums ===
List of demo albums
Title	Album details
Left By Soft	Released: 1981; Label: ClicheBootlegCenterTapesRekords&Publicery (001); Format: Cassette
Odditties	Released: 1983; Label: Cleano Productions (ODD 1); Format: Cassette
Odditties 2	Released: 1988; Label: Cleano Productions (ODD 2); Format: Cassette

== Extended plays ==
List of EPs, with New Zealand chart positions
Title	Album details	Peak chart positions
Title	Album details	NZ
Boodle Boodle Boodle	Released: November 1981; Label: Flying Nun Records (FN003); Format: 12" LP	5
Great Sounds Great, Good Sounds Good, So-so Sounds So-so, Bad Sounds Bad, Rotten Sounds Rotten	Released: May 1982; Label: Flying Nun Records (GOOD 001); Format: 12" LP	4
Live Dead Clean	Released: August 1986; Label: Flying Nun Records (LDC 001); Format: 12" LP	23
In-a-Live	Released: 1989; Label: Flying Nun Europe (FNE 29); Format: 12" LP	-
Slush Fund	Released: 2001; Label: Arclife Records; Format: promo CD	-

=== Singles ===
List of singles with selected New Zealand positions
Title	Year	Peak chart positions	Album
Title	Year	NZ	Album
1981	"Tally Ho!"	19	
1982	"Getting Older"	-	Odditties
1994	"Late Last Night"	-	
