= Thousands of Tiny Luminous Spheres =

Compilation album by The Bats
- Released: 2000
- Recorded: January 1985–April 1998
- Label: Flying Nun Records

The Bats chronology
Couchmaster (1995)	Thousands of Tiny Luminous Spheres (2000)	At the National Grid (2005)

Professional ratings
Review scores
Source	Rating
Allmusic	link

Thousands of Tiny Luminous Spheres is a compilation album released in 2000 by New Zealand band The Bats.

== Track listing ==
CD
No.	Title	Length
1.	"North by North" (from the album Daddy's Highway)	4:05
2.	"Courage" (from the album Silverbeet)	4:03
3.	"Claudine" (from the EP And Here Is 'Music for the Fireside')	3:15
4.	"Afternoon in Bed" (from the album Couchmaster)	3:50
5.	"Block of Wood" (from the album Daddy's Highway)	3:11
6.	"Mastery" (from the album The Law of Things)	2:55
7.	"Smoking Her Wings" (from the album The Law Of Things)	4:35
8.	"For the Ride" (from the album Couchmaster)	3:43
9.	"You Have the Right" (previously unreleased)	3:25
10.	"I've Seen It All Before" (previously unreleased)	4:25
11.	"Too Much" (from the album Silverbeet)	2:58
12.	"Spill the Beans" (from the EP Spill the Beans)	2:35
13.	"The Black and the Blue" (from the album Fear of God)	3:15
14.	"Boogey Man" (from the album Fear of God)	3:16
15.	"Tragedy" (from the album Daddy's Highway)	3:02
16.	"Made Up In Blue" (from the EP Made Up in Blue)	4:00
17.	"Supernova" (from the album Couchmaster)	1:17

The track "North by North" featured in the ABC Television series The Hollowmen as the theme from the opening and closing titles.
