= Vehicle (The Clean album) =

Studio album by the Clean
- Released: 1990
- Recorded: 18–21 July 1989
- Studios: Blackwing, London, England
- Genres: Indie rock, alternative rock
- Length: 28:30
- Labels: Flying Nun, Rough Trade
- Producer: The Clean

The Clean chronology
Compilation (1986)	Vehicle (1990)	Modern Rock (1994)

Vehicle is the first studio album by New Zealand rock group the Clean. It was released in 1990 by Flying Nun and Rough Trade Records. Much of the material was written for the band's reunion tour in the late 1980s. Rough Trade founder Geoff Travis offered to record the Clean after seeing them play in London, after which Vehicle was produced during a three-day session. The album was engineered by Ken Kennedy and notable producer Alan Moulder, who was suggested by Travis.

The front cover artwork is a painting by band member David Kilgour.

== Background ==
The Clean formed in Dunedin, New Zealand in 1978, consisting of vocalist and bassist Peter Gutteridge, guitarist David Kilgour and drummer Hamish Kilgour. They made their live debut that year supporting the Enemy. Sometime later, Gutteridge left to form the Chills, being replaced by Robert Scott; the Chills temporarily broke-up in June 1981, and their guitarist Martin Phillipps joined the Clean on keyboards. They issued their debut single "Tally Ho!" (1981) through independent label Flying Nun Records, followed by the Boodle Boodle Boodle (1981) and Great Sounds Great, Good Sounds Good, So-so Sounds So-so, Bad Sounds Bad, Rotten Sounds Rotten (1982) EPs. By the time the "Getting Older" single was released, the band had broken up, spurred on by the pressures of fame. Over the ensuing years, the members would form other acts and the Odditties (1983) and Odditties 2 (1988) compilations would be issued.

The Clean, with a line-up of Kilgour, Kilgour, and Scott, eventually reunited on 13 July 1988 for a one-off show at the Fulham Greyhound pub in London, England. After this was issued as the In-a-Live EP, Flying Nun said the reunion would be permanent. Following some touring, they made their debut album Vehicle, prior to breaking up again.

== Critical reception ==
Professional ratings
Review scores
Source	Rating
AllMusic	4/5 stars
Alternative Rock	5/10
Robert Christgau	A−
Pitchfork	8.4/10
Spin Alternative Record Guide	5/10

The New York Times wrote that "the guitar chords still tumble out with the grace of falling bricks, and the songs have an endearing buoyancy that results from the band's conscious rejection of precision." Author Dave Thompson, in his book Alternative Rock (2000), wrote that the album has "little in the way of songs ... but a lot of texture and attitude. Not worth waiting for, but it sure feels nice."

== Track listing ==
All songs written by David Kilgour, Hamish Kilgour, and Robert Scott.

No.	Title	Length
1.	"Draw(in)g to a (W)hole"	2:03
2.	"I Wait Around"	2:42
3.	"Bye Bye"	2:15
4.	"The Blue"	1:45
5.	"Dunes"	3:01
6.	"Some One"	1:51
7.	"Home"	2:01
8.	"Diamond Shine"	3:13
9.	"Getting to You"	1:46
10.	"Big Soft Punch"	2:32
11.	"Big Cat"	1:41
12.	"I Can See"	2:33
13.	"Gem"	1:07

== Charts ==
Chart (1990)	Peak position
New Zealand Albums (RMNZ)	35
