= Afternoon in Bed =

Afternoon In Bed

EP by The Bats
- Released: 1995
- Genre: Dunedin sound, Indie pop, Alternative rock
- Label: Flying Nun Records FNCD341
- Producer: The Bats

The Bats chronology
Couchmaster (1995)	Afternoon In Bed (1995)	At the National Grid (2006)

Afternoon In Bed is an EP released in 1995 by New Zealand band The Bats.

== Track listing ==
CD
No.	Title	Length
1.	"Afternoon In Bed"
2.	"Consider It Sold"
3.	"Got The Answer"
4.	"On Your Side"

== Personnel ==
- Malcolm Grant - drums
- Paul Kean - bass, vocals
- Robert Scott - guitar, lead vocals
- Kaye Woodward - guitar, vocals
