= Courage (disambiguation) =

Courage is the ability to confront fear in the face of pain, danger, uncertainty or intimidation.

Courage may also refer to:

== Ethics ==
- Civil courage, a core issue in ethics
- Moral courage, an important virtue in various areas of life

== Arts and entertainment ==
=== Film and television ===
- Courage (1921 film), an American silent drama film
- Courage (1930 film), an American drama film
- Courage (1939 film), a Soviet adventure film
- Courage, or Raw Courage, a 1984 film starring Ronny Cox
- Courage, a 1986 television film starring Sophia Loren
- Courage (2011 film), a Polish film
- Courage (2021 film), a German-Belarusian documentary film
- Courage (Courage the Cowardly Dog), the title character of the animated TV series Courage the Cowardly Dog (1999-2002)
- "Courage" (X-Men), a television episode

=== Literature and periodicals ===
- Courage (newspaper), a German feminist newspaper 1976–1984
- Courage: Eight Portraits, a 2007 book by Gordon Brown
- Courage: The Backbone of Leadership, a 2006 book by Gus Lee and Diane Elliott-Lee

=== Music ===
- The Courage, an American folk rock band

==== Albums ====
- Courage (Celine Dion album) or the title song (see below), 2019
- Courage (Fish Leong album) or the title song, 2000
- Courage (Frankie J album) or the title song, 2011
- Courage (Milton Nascimento album) or the title song, 1969
- Courage (Paula Cole album), 2007
- Courage (EP), by the Bats, or the title song, 1993

==== Songs ====
- "Courage" (Celine Dion song), 2019
- "Courage (for Hugh MacLennan)", by the Tragically Hip, 1993
- "Courage", by the Bats from Silverbeet, 1993
- "Courage", by Alien Ant Farm from Anthology, 2001
- "Courage", by Flatfoot 56 from Black Thorn, 2010
- "Courage", by Orianthi from Believe (II), 2010
- "Courage", by Pink from Hurts 2B Human, 2019
- "Courage", by Superchick from Beauty from Pain, 2005
- "Courage", by Villagers from Darling Arithmetic, 2015
- "Courage", by the Whitest Boy Alive from Rules, 2009

== Organizations and companies ==
- Courage Brewery, a defunct British brewery
- Courage Compétition, a motor racing team and company based at Le Mans
- Courage Foundation, a fundraising trust for the legal defence of whistleblowers and journalists
- Courage International, a Roman Catholic organization
- Courage Investment Group, a Bermuda-registered shipping company
- Courage UK (originally Courage Trust), a nonprofit evangelical Christian organisation
- Courage, the mascot and the motto of the Second Cavalry Regiment, an Australian Army Armoured Reconnaissance Regiment
- Voyah Courage, Chinese compact crossover SUV

== People with the surname ==
- Alexander Courage (1919–2008), American composer
- Anthony Courage (1875 – 1944), one of the British First World War cavalry generals
- James Courage (1903–1963), New Zealand novelist
- Piers Courage (1942–1970), British race car driver

== See also ==
- Courasche, a fictional character
- Bravery (disambiguation)
- Encouragement (disambiguation)
- Fearless (disambiguation)
- Mother Courage (disambiguation)
