= Compilation (The Clean album) =

Compilation album by The Clean
- Released: 1986
- Recorded: 1981–1982
- Genre: Indie rock, lo-fi
- Length: 57:00
- Language: English
- Label: Flying Nun

The Clean chronology
Odditties (1983)	Compilation (1986)	Vehicle (1990)

Professional ratings
Review scores
Source	Rating
Allmusic	4.5/5 stars

Compilation is a compilation cassette by New Zealand group The Clean. It was released in 1986 by Flying Nun Records. The album consists of early recordings, as well as songs from their 2 EPs, "Boodle Boodle Boodle" and "Great Sounds Great, Good Sounds Good, So-so Sounds So-so, Bad Sounds Bad, Rotten Sounds Rotten". The CD version also contains 6 additional live tracks.

== Track listing ==
1. "Billy Two"
2. "At The Bottom"
3. "Tally Ho!"
4. "Anything Could Happen"
5. "Point That Thing Somewhere Else"
6. "Flowers"
7. "Fish"
8. "Beatnik"
9. "Getting Older"
10. "Slug Song"
11. "Oddity"
12. "Whatever I Do"

Bonus tracks on 1988 version

1. "Quickstep" – 4:11
2. "Count To Ten" – 2:03
3. "Wild Western Shores" – 2:41
4. "Art School" – 2:15
5. "Hold Onto The Rail" – 2:59
6. "Point That Thing Somewhere Else (A Return)" – 6:39

== Personnel ==
- Vocals – Doug Hood
- Bass, Vocals – Peter Gutteridge
- Drums – Lyndsay Hooke
- Drums, Vocals, Artwork [Cover]– Hamish Kilgour
- Guitar, Liner Notes, Compiled By [Cd Booklet] – David Kilgour
- Compiled By [Cd Booklet], Photography By [All Other Photographs] – Craig McNab
- Photography By [Early Clean Photograph] – Terry Moore
- Recorded By – Chris Knox (tracks: 1, 4 to 10, 12), The Clean (tracks: 1, 2, 4 to 12), Doug Hood (tracks: 1, 4 to 10, 12)
- Written-By – Kilgour, Kilgour, Gutteridge (tracks: 5, 18), Scott (tracks: 1 to 4, 6 to 17)
