= Courage (EP) =

EP by The Bats
- Released: 1993
- Recorded: November 15 – December 2, 1992, The Outpost, Stroughton Massachusetts; December 4–12, 1992, The Carriage House, Stamford Connecticut
- Genre: Dunedin sound, indie pop, alternative rock
- Label: Flying Nun Records FNCD261,
- Producer: The Bats

The Bats chronology
Silverbeet (1993)	Courage (1993)	Spill the Beans (1994)

Courage is an EP released in 1993 by New Zealand band The Bats.

== Track listing ==
CD
No.	Title	Length
1.	"Courage"	4:05
2.	"Mind How You Run"	3:04
3.	"Slow Alight"	4:46
4.	"The Wind Is Sad"	2:53

== Personnel ==
- Malcolm Grant - drums
- Paul Kean - bass, vocals
- Robert Scott - guitar, lead vocals
- Kaye Woodward - guitar, vocals
