= The Puddle =

New Zealand music group

- Origin: Dunedin, New Zealand
- Genres: Alternative rock, pop rock
- Years active: 1983–present
- Labels: Flying Nun, Fishrider
- Members: George D. Henderson; Ian Henderson; Gavin Shaw; Alan Starrett
- Past members: Shayne P. Carter; Peter Gutteridge; Ross Jackson; Lesley Z. Paris; Norma O'Malley; Lindsay Maitland; Alan Haig; Heath Te Au; Jenny Crooks; Richard Cotton; Norman Dufty; Vikki Wilkinson

The Puddle are a New Zealand rock band originally formed in Dunedin in 1983 by George D. Henderson. They had a mini-album, a live album, a studio album and a single released on New Zealand independent record label Flying Nun Records between 1986 and 1993. The group has continued to exist since then, with several line-up changes and periods of inactivity. Since 2006 the group has released four albums on Dunedin independent record label Fishrider Records.

== Early history ==
Prior to forming The Puddle George D. Henderson had been a key member of Wellington, New Zealand experimental avant-garde punk groups The Amps and The Spies. In 1980 he relocated to Christchurch and formed The And Band who self released one 7-inch single.

Very early line-ups of The Puddle included Shayne P. Carter on drums, replaced briefly by current drummer Ian Henderson who is George's brother. The first settled line-up of the band, which recorded the min-album Pop Lib, released on Flying Nun Records in 1986, also included Peter Gutteridge (keyboards), Lesley Z Paris (drums), Ross Jackson (bass), Norma O'Malley (flute) and Lindsay Maitland (coronet & French horn).

Maitland died of an accidental drug overdose in 1987 and Gutteridge left to form Snapper. The remaining line-up recorded a live album Live at the Teddy Bear Club released on Flying Nun Records (FN172). It was followed in 1992 by a studio album, Into the Moon (FNCD164), recorded by Alastair Galbraith, which was released on CD together with the "Pop Lib" EP.

Henderson was imprisoned in 1991 for drug-related offending. On his release a new line-up of The Puddle was formed. This line-up recorded a 7-inch single "Thursday"/"Too Hot to be Cool" released on Flying Nun Records in 1993 (FN278). At this time this line-up of The Puddle recorded an album Songs For Emily Valentine. This album was not released until 2005 although two songs from it were released as a 7-inch single on French label Acetone in 1993.

In the second half of the 1990s Henderson contributed songs to the Dunedin collective group Mink. In 2000 The Puddle (with Ross Jackson back on bass and Alan Haig on drums) performed at the Dunedin Sound music event organised and broadcast live on California's KFJC radio station, and are included on the double CD released by the station as KFJC 89.7 FM Presents The Dunedin Sound.

== 2001 to present ==
The Puddle (Henderson and Jackson, with ex-Mink drummer Heath Te Au) continued to play from 2001, although Henderson's health was affected by continued drug use and the effects of hepatitis C.

In 2005 Henderson began to address his health issues. This coincided with a studio recording session in Wellington organised by a friend Richard Steele (which produced the 2010 album Playboys in the Bush). Since then The Puddle have recorded another four albums, all released on Fishrider Records. The current line-up of The Puddle (since 2006) is Henderson (guitar, vocals), his brother Ian Henderson (drums), Gavin Shaw (bass) and Alan Starrett (viola, keyboards). They are occasionally augmented by keyboard/ trumpet player Lucy Hunter from fellow Fishrider Records band Opposite Sex.

== Discography ==
=== Albums ===
Date of release	Title	Label	Charted	Certification	Catalog number
Albums
1991	Live at the Teddy Bear Club	Flying Nun	-	-	FN172
1992	Into the Moon (includes Pop Lib EP)	Flying Nun	-	-	FNCD164
2005	Songs for Emily Valentine	Powertool	-	-	PT047
2007	No Love – No Hate	Fishrider	-	-	-
2009	The Shakespeare Monkey	Fishrider	-	-	FISH004
2010	Playboys in the Bush	Fishrider	-	-	FISH005
2012	Secret Holiday & Victory Blues	Fishrider	-	-	FISH007
EPs / Mini-albums
1986	Pop Lib	Flying Nun	-	-	THIS 001 / PUD 001

=== Singles and other appearances ===
- "Christmas in the Country" appeared on a 1987 Bnet compilation Weird Culture Weird Custom
- Live in the palm of your hand, cassette, Infinite Regress (1989)
- "Friends (live)" appeared on a split Onset/Offset label 7-inch around 1987
- "Thursday"/"Too Hot To Be Cool", 7-inch, Flying Nun (1993)
- "The Power of Love"/"Mamelons damadou", 7-inch Acetone (France) (1995)
- "Average Sensual Man", on split 7-inch single with Robert Scott/Adalita Srsen (2010)
- "Secret Holiday"/"Victory Blues", Fishrider (2012)
