= The Gordons =

The Gordons may refer to:

- The Gordons, a 1950s vocal group that included Honi Gordon
- The Gordons (duo), a folk/bluegrass duo consisting of Gary Gordon and Roberta Gordon
- Bailter Space, a band previously known as The Gordons
  - The Gordons (album), a 1981 album by The Gordons
- The Gordons (writers), crime fiction authors Gordon Gordon and Mildred Gordon
