= Modern Rock (album) =

Studio album by the Clean
- Released: 1994
- Recorded: 6–15 April 1994
- Studio: Hoopers Inlet Hall, Otakou Peninsula, Dunedin
- Genre: Indie rock, alternative rock
- Length: 46:54
- Label: Flying Nun, Summershine
- Producer: The Clean, Stephen Kilroy, and Tex Houston.

The Clean chronology
Vehicle (1990)	Modern Rock (1994)	Unknown Country (1996)

Modern Rock is the second studio album by New Zealand group the Clean, released in 1994.

== Critical reception ==
Professional ratings
Review scores
Source	Rating
AllMusic	3.5/5 stars

Trouser Press called the album "a more grown-up affair that floats off-kilter melodies and tiny tensile guitar in a slower, softer swirl of cloudy organ lines and spacey electric piano textures, with liberal use of strings and folk instruments."

== Track listing ==
No.	Title	Length
1.	"Starting Point"	2:26
2.	"Outside the Cage"	5:05
3.	"Linger Longer"	2:25
4.	"Wake Up in the Morning"	3:55
5.	"2 Reasons"	3:40
6.	"Safe in the Rain"	2:59
7.	"Secret Place"	3:35
8.	"Something I Need"	3:41
9.	"Different World"	3:45
10.	"Stomp the Guru"	2:18
11.	"Too Much Violence"	3:48
12.	"Phluke"	2:23
13.	"Do Your Thing"	4:13
14.	"Ginger Ale"	2:46

== Personnel ==
The Clean

- David Kilgour – sang and played guitars, keyboards, percussion, and hammer dulcimer.
- Robert Scott – sang and played bass, acoustic guitar, keyboards, percussion, and hammer dulcimer.
- Hamish Kilgour – sang and played drums, percussion, and guitar.

Additional musicians

- Alan Starrett – played hammer dulcimer, cello, viola, mandolin, and accordion.
- Lisa Siegel – played percussion on "Do Your Thing."
- Brydie Scott – sang "Ginger Ale."
- Stephen Kilroy – foot stomped on "Something I Need."

== Charts ==
Chart (1994)	Peak position
New Zealand Albums (RMNZ)	41
