= The Guilty Office =

Studio album by the Bats
- Released: 1 December 2008 (NZ); 23 June 2009 (USA)
- Recorded: August 2007 – June 2008
- Studio: The National Grid and Longfellow Studio in Christchurch, and Masonic Lodge, Port Chalmers
- Genre: Indie rock, alternative rock, indie pop
- Label: Arch Hill (NZ); Hidden Agenda (USA)

The Bats chronology
At the National Grid (2005)	The Guilty Office (2008)	Free All the Monsters (2011)

Professional ratings
Review scores
Source	Rating
AllMusic	4/5 stars
Blurt	9/10 stars
Mojo	4/5 stars
Pitchfork	7.5/10 stars
PopMatters	6/10 stars
Prefix Magazine	7/10 stars
Uncut	3/5 stars

The Guilty Office is the seventh studio album by New Zealand indie band the Bats, released in New Zealand on 1 December 2008, and in the United States on 23 June 2009.

== Recording and New Zealand release ==
Recording of The Guilty Office began on 25–26 August 2007 in the newly built National Grid Studio in Heathcote Valley, Christchurch. The band had a few songs prepared from a demo session earlier in 2007, as well as some new songs written by Robert Scott. Scott has said that the recording process was "...pretty much the same as the others. I had a big bunch of songs and the rest of the band chose the ones they liked and we got them into shape and put them down live in the studio." The tracks "Guilty Office" and "Two Lines" grew out of improvised jams. The rhythm tracks for the album were recorded by John Kelcher. Additional tracks and mixing and mastering were recorded by Paul Keen at Longfellow Studio, while the strings, harp and accordion parts were recorded by Mike McLeod at the Masonic Lodge in Port Chalmers.

The album was released in New Zealand by Arch Hill on 1 December 2008. The cover art is by band member Robert Scott.

The video for "Castle Lights" was filmed in London by Hector Hazard, whereas the first video, for "Like Water in Your Hand", was simply shots of light reflecting off water ripples.

== International releases ==
The album was released internationally by the following labels:

- Australia – Mistletone
- Sweden – Kning Disk (limited edition of 450 numbered copies)
- United Kingdom and Europe – Yesboyicream
- United States – Hidden Agenda (23 June 2009)

== Track listing ==
All tracks are written by the Bats/Robert Scott.

No.	Title	Length
1.	"Countersign"	4:19
2.	"Crimson Enemy"	2:52
3.	"Broken Path"	4:37
4.	"Like Water in Your Hands"	1:39
5.	"Castle Lights"	3:45
6.	"Two Lines"	3:37
7.	"Satellites"	4:30
8.	"Later on That Night"	3:44
9.	"Steppin' Out"	2:16
10.	"The I Specialist"	3:24
11.	"The Guilty Office"	5:01
12.	"The Orchard"	3:56
