= The Deep Set =

Studio album by the Bats
- Released: 27 January 2017
- Studio: The Sitting Room, Lyttelton, New Zealand
- Genre: Dunedin sound, indie pop, alternative rock
- Length: 40:34
- Label: Flying Nun Records
- Producer: Ben Edwards, the Bats

The Bats chronology
Free All the Monsters (2011)	The Deep Set (2017)	Foothills (2020)

Professional ratings
Review scores
Source	Rating
Allmusic	4/5 stars
Otago Daily Times	4/5 stars

The Deep Set is the ninth album by New Zealand band the Bats, released in 2017.

== Recording and release ==
In December 2015, the Bats recorded tracks for the album at Sitting Room studios in Lyttelton, New Zealand. The album was recorded and co-produced by Ben Edwards.

The album was released on 27 January 2017 with the label Flying Nun.

== Track listing ==
All tracks are written by the Bats/Robert Scott.

No.	Title	Length
1.	"Rooftops"	4:26
2.	"Looking For Sunshine"	2:45
3.	"Rock and Pillars"	4:27
4.	"Walking Man"	3:25
5.	"No Trace"	2:50
6.	"Diamonds"	2:53
7.	"Antlers"	4:16
8.	"Busy"	2:43
9.	"Steeley Gaze"	4:55
10.	"Durkestan"	3:07
11.	"Shut Your Eyes"	2:34
12.	"Not So Good"	2:13

== Personnel ==
- Malcolm Grant - drums
- Paul Kean - backing vocals, bass
- Robert Scott - vocals, guitar, keyboards
- Kaye Woodward - vocals, guitar

Also credited:

- Ben Edwards - engineer, co-producer
