= Free All the Monsters =

Studio album by the Bats
- Released: 15 October 2011
- Recorded: December 2010
- Studios: Seacliff Asylum, New Zealand
- Genres: Dunedin sound, indie pop, alternative rock
- Label: Flying Nun
- Producers: Dale Cotton, the Bats

The Bats chronology
The Guilty Office (2008)	Free All the Monsters (2011)	The Deep Set (2017)

Free All the Monsters is the eighth full-length album by New Zealand band the Bats, released in 2011.

== Recording and release ==
In December 2010, the Bats recorded tracks for the album at a backpackers and stables at the old Seacliff Asylum, between Oamaru and Dunedin. The album was recorded and co-produced by Dale Cotton, who had produced Robert Scott's recent solo album.

The album was released on 15 October 2011. In New Zealand, the Bats reunited with their old label Flying Nun. Internationally the album was released by Mistletone Records in Australia, Revolver/Midheaven Distribution in the U.S.A, and Forte Distribution in the U.K. & Europe.

== Reception ==
Professional ratings
Review scores
Source	Rating
AllMusic	4/5 stars
The New Zealand Herald	4/5 stars
Pitchfork	7.5/10

The album has been praised by critics in New Zealand and internationally. Tim Sendra of AllMusic said, "The Bats have managed to maintain a ridiculously high level of quality throughout their career, and Free All the Monsters is as good a record as they’ve ever made." It was described by Pitchfork as "...their best record in years, possibly ever". In The Sunday Times, Stewart Lee said, "the band still sounds like a downbeat Byrds running on rusted Velvet Underground rhythms, but "In the Subway" is as driven and dense as the best of their back catalogue. These older and wiser Bats wield their melancholy melodies as warmly as their more frantic former selves."

The album was shortlisted for the 2012 Taite Music Prize.

== Track listing ==
All tracks are written by the Bats/Robert Scott.

No.	Title	Length
1.	"Long Halls"	4:27
2.	"Simpletons"	3:56
3.	"Free All the Monsters"	2:57
4.	"See Right Through Me"	4:59
5.	"It's Not the Same"	3:07
6.	"In the Subway"	3:35
7.	"Fingers of Dawn"	4:13
8.	"Spacejunk"	4:47
9.	"On the Bank"	3:49
10.	"Canopy"	2:03
11.	"When the Day Comes"	3:12
12.	"Getting Over You"	1:53

== Personnel ==
- Malcolm Grant - drums
- Paul Kean - backing vocals, bass
- Robert Scott - vocals, guitar, keyboards
- Kaye Woodward - vocals, guitar

Also credited:

- Alan Starrett - viola, dulcimer ("Long Halls")
- John Egenes - mandolin ("Free All the Monsters")
- Dale Cotton - engineer, co-producer
