= A.D.M. (album) =

Studio album by Snapper
- Released: 1996
- Genre: Dunedin sound
- Label: Flying Nun
- Producers: Peter Gutteridge, Brendan Hoffman

Snapper chronology
Shotgun Blossom (1990)	A.D.M. (1996)

A.D.M. is the second studio album by New Zealand band Snapper, released in 1996. The title track abbreviation is taken from that of the T-4 Atomic Demolition Munition weapon.

== Critical reception ==
Professional ratings
Review scores
Source	Rating
The Encyclopedia of Popular Music	3/5 stars

Stylus Magazine wrote that "the deceptively simple verse/chorus/verse structure of the songs masks Gutteridge’s fearless experimentation into background distortion." John Taite in Rip It Up described the album as "Complex and horrific. Primal but effective."

== Track listing ==
1. "Tomcat"
2. "Hammerhead"
3. "Small Town Secret"
4. "Demon"
5. "Hotchkiss"
6. "A.D.M."
7. "Killzone 44"
8. "Stalker"
9. "Lock and Load"
10. "Used to Know Her Name"

== Personnel ==
Snapper

- Mike Dooley – drums
- Peter Gutteridge – guitar, keyboards, vocals, producer

Additional personnel

- Demarnia Lloyd – vocals
- Celia Pavlova – vocals
- Christine Voice – vocals

Production and artwork

- Brendan Hoffman - producer, engineer
- Christine Voice - cover art
