= Courageous =

Courageous describes a person possessing courage. It may also refer to:

- Courageous (film), a Christian film by Sherwood pictures
  - "Courageous" (song), a 2011 Casting Crowns song based on the film
- HMS Courageous, several ships of the Royal Navy
- RSS Courageous, a Fearless class patrol vessel
- USCGC Courageous (WMEC-622), a United States Coast Guard medium endurance cutter
- Courageous (yacht), a 12-metre class yacht

== See also ==
- Albert III, Duke of Saxony (1443-1500), nicknamed "the Courageous"
- Courage (disambiguation)
