= Encouragement =

Encouragement may refer to:

- Incitement, the encouragement of another person to commit a crime
- Encouragement (therapy)
- "Encouragement", a song by Don Toliver off the 2023 album Love Sick

== See also ==
- National Day of Encouragement
- Encourage Films, a Japanese animation studio
- Courage (disambiguation)
