= Compilation =

Compilation may refer to:

- In computer programming, the translation of source code into object code by a compiler
  - Compilation error
  - Compilation unit
- Product bundling, a marketing strategy used to sell multiple products, such as video game compilations
- Compilation thesis

== Media ==
=== Literature ===
- Anthology, a collection of short works, most often poetry or short stories

=== Film & TV ===
- Anthology film
- Compilation documentary
- Compilation film, a feature film that is mostly composed of footage from an older television serial, movie serial or short films
- Compilation episode, a clip show with clips from a TV series assembled together in one episode
- Compilation, a pornographic film or video made up of various segments from other productions or leftover or spare footage

=== Music ===
- Compilation album, a vinyl record or compact disc consisting of thematically related musical tracks
- Compilation (Caustic Window album), 1998
- Compilation (The Clean album), 1986
- Compilation, a 1991 CD by Look Blue Go Purple.
