= Shotgun Blossom =

Studio album by Snapper
- Released: 1990, 1991
- Genre: Dunedin sound
- Label: Avalanche
- Producers: Brent McLachlan, Peter Gutteridge

Snapper chronology
Snapper (1988)	Shotgun Blossom (1990)	A.D.M. (1996)

Shotgun Blossom is the debut album by New Zealand band Snapper. It was released via Avalanche Records.

== Critical reception ==
Professional ratings
Review scores
Source	Rating
AllMusic	4/5 stars
The Encyclopedia of Popular Music	3/5 stars

AllMusic wrote that "[Peter] Gutteridge and Dominic Stones' guitar work balanced between minimal obsessiveness and brawling, massive soloing, the latter kept as part of the mix instead of the standout element ('Eyes That Shine' is a perfect example of this, with its snarl/buzzsaw opening notes and almost liquid melodies flowing through the noise)." The Guardian called the album "harsh and hard and droning and unrelenting."

== Track listing ==
1. "Pop Your Top"
2. "Can"
3. "Telepod Fly"
4. "Eyes That Shine"
5. "Dead Pictures"
6. "What Are You Thinking"
7. "Hot Sun"
8. "I Don't Know"
9. "Emmanuelle"
10. "Dry Spot"
11. "Rain"

== Personnel ==
Snapper

- Alan Haig – drums
- Dominic Stones – guitar
- Peter Gutteridge – guitar, keyboards, vocals, production
- Christine Voice – keyboards, vocals, artwork

Additional personnel

- Brent McLachlan – engineering, production
