= By Night (EP) =

EP by The Bats
- Released: 1984
- Recorded: 1984 at Nightshift Studios in Christchurch, New Zealand
- Genre: Dunedin sound, indie pop, alternative rock
- Label: Flying Nun
- Producer: The Bats

The Bats chronology
By Night (1984)	And Here Is 'Music for the Fireside' (1985)

Professional ratings
Review scores
Source	Rating
AllMusic	4/5 stars
Spin Alternative Record Guide	7/10

By Night is the debut recording of New Zealand indie rock group The Bats, released in 1984.

In 1990, Flying Nun released the first three Bats EPs as Compiletely Bats. However, the track "My Way," from this EP, was omitted. It was added in the 2010 remastered reissue of the CD.

== Critical reception ==
Trouser Press called it "paradoxically morose and exhilarating; each song a moody pop gem, with hints of the hard-strummed countryisms of Gram Parsons." PopMatters wrote that it balances "pop grace and idiosyncrasy."

== Track listing ==
Side 1
No.	Title	Length
1.	"I Go Wild"	2:38
2.	"Jewellers Heart"	3:23
3.	"By Night"	2:29

Side 2
No.	Title	Length
4.	"My Way"	2:56
5.	"Man In The Moon"	3:07
6.	"United Airways"	2:03

== Personnel ==
- Malcolm Grant - drums
- Paul Kean - backing vocals, bass
- Robert Scott - lead vocals, guitar, piano
- Kaye Woodward - backing vocals, guitar, 12-string guitar
