= Fishrider Records =

Record Label based in New Zealand

Fishrider Records is a music label based in Dunedin, New Zealand. It was established in 2006 by Ian Henderson. The label styles itself as a "micro-independent" or "underground" label, releasing psychedelic pop and no-wave music. Henderson plays drums for The Puddle, who are currently released on Fishrider Records. Henderson was previously a freelance music writer who wrote for the Southland Times newspaper in Invercargill between 1985 and 1997 and also for 1980s/90s Dunedin music fanzines Garage and Alley Oop.

Artists on Fishrider Records include The Puddle, Robert Scott and The Dark Beaks, alongside younger up-and-coming acts Opposite Sex, Trick Mammoth, Males, and The Prophet Hens. In 2012 the label partnered with Occultation Recordings to co-release New Sacral by Factory Star, the band led by The Fall/Blue Orchids founder Martin Bramah.

== Fishrider Records catalogue ==
Sources:

- FISH013 V/A - TEMPORARY - Selections From Dunedin's Pop Underground 2011 - 2014 CD/LP (2014)
- FISH012 Trick Mammoth - Floristry CD/LP (2014)
- FISH011 Males - Run Run Run/MalesMalesMales CD/LP (2013)
- FISH010 The Prophet Hens - Popular People Do Popular People CD (2013)
- FISH009 Factory Star - New Sacral 10"/CD (2012)
- FISH008 The Shifting Sands - Feel CD (2012)
- FISH007 The Puddle - Secret Holiday & Victory Blues CD/LP (2012)
- FISH006 Opposite Sex - Opposite Sex CD/LP (2011)
- FISH005 The Puddle - Playboys in the Bush CD/LP (2010)
- FISH004 Robert Scott & Adalita Srsen / The Puddle split 7-inch single (2010)
- FISH003 The Puddle - The Shakespeare Monkey CD (2009)
- FISH002 The Puddle - No Love - No Hate CD (2007)
- FISH001 The Dark Beaks - Spill Your Heart CD (2006)
