= Snapper (EP) =

EP by Snapper
- Released: 1988
- Genres: Dunedin sound, kraut-pop
- Label: Flying Nun

Snapper chronology
Snapper (1988)	Shotgun Blossom (1990)

Snapper is an EP by New Zealand band Snapper, released in 1988 through Flying Nun Records.

== Critical reception ==
Professional ratings
Review scores
Source	Rating
Pitchfork	7.5/10

In its review of the 2013 Record Store Day re-release, Pitchfork wrote that "each track hums to the sound of a familiar organ drone and a wash of distorted guitar, all tied into a precision-tooled drive that mirrors Klaus Dinger's motorik drumming in Neu!"

== Track listing ==
1. "Buddy" – 3:40
2. "Cause of You" – 3:43
3. "Death and Weirdness in the Surfing Zone" – 2:44
4. "Hang On" – 5:26

== Personnel ==
Snapper

- Alan Haig – drums
- Dominic Stones – guitar, vocals
- Christine Voice – keyboards, vocals, guitar
- Peter Gutteridge – vocals, guitar, keyboards

== Charts ==
Chart (1988)	Peak position
New Zealand (Recorded Music NZ)	49
