= Spasm (disambiguation) =

Spasm is a sudden, involuntary contraction of a muscle, a group of muscles or a hollow organ.

Spasm may also refer to:

- "Spasm" (song), by Peach, 1993
- "Spasm", a song by Dave's True Story
- "Spasm", a song by David Kilgour from Here Come the Cars
- "Spasm", a song by Meshuggah from Nothing
- "Spasm", a song by Scorn from Vae Solis
- Spasms (film), a 1983 film by William Fruet
- SPASM: Virtual Reality, Android Music and Electric Flesh, a 1993 book by Arthur Kroker

== See also ==
- Spasmo, a 1974 film by Umberto Lenzi
