= Future Shock (EP) =

EP by The Gordons
- Released: December 1980
- Studio: Harlequin Studios
- Genre: Post-punk, noise rock
- Label: Gordons
- Producer: The Gordons, Simon Alexander

The Gordons chronology
Future Shock (1980)	The Gordons (1981)

Professional ratings
Review scores
Source	Rating
AllMusic	3/5 stars

Future Shock is the debut EP of New Zealand post-punk band The Gordons, released in December 1980. The EP was initially self-released, later reissued multiple times by Flying Nun Records following their signing to the label.

== Background ==
The Gordons formed in March 1980 in Christchurch (initially without "The" in the title), and quickly gained notoriety for the volume of their live shows and their aggressive sound. Following a lost recording session at Sausage Studios in Wellington while on tour, they decided to attempt again at Harlequin Studios in Auckland. The three songs were recorded and mixed in a single budget midnight-dawn session on a 8-track tape machine.

In contrast to much of the New Zealand post-punk emerging at that time, the sound of the release was much more noisy and distorted than their contemporaries. The first pressing of the EP was self-released by the band, with the first run of 500 in December 1980 selling out within a month, requiring another 500 copies. In 1981, Flying Nun started distributing the EP, later repressing it themselves in 1982 following the release of the band's self-titled album on the label the year before. The EP was reissued in 1988 on its own, and bundled into a release alongside the first Gordons album, after Parker and Halverson had reformed into Bailter Space.

== Critical reception ==
Trouser Press wrote that it "matched progressive punk songwriting and aggression with an uncategorizably deliberate yet extreme wall of flailing sheetmetal guitar."

== Track listing ==
Side A

1. Future Shock

Side B

1. Machine Song
2. Adults And Children

== Personnel ==
- Brent McLachlan (drums)
- Alister Parker (guitar, vocals)
- John Halvorsen (guitar, vocals)
