= The Law of Things =

Studio album by the Bats
- Released: 1990
- Recorded: Sept–Oct 1988
- Genre: Dunedin sound, alternative rock
- Length: 38:56
- Label: Flying Nun
- Producer: The Bats, Brent McLachlan

The Bats chronology
4 Songs (1988)	The Law of Things (1990)	Fear of God (1991)

The Law of Things is the second album by the New Zealand band the Bats, released in 1990. It was released by Mammoth Records in the United States.

The track "Smoking Her Wings" was released as a single, and the album peaked at No. 38 in the New Zealand charts.

== Production ==
The album was recorded at Writhe Recording in Wellington, New Zealand, toward the end of 1988. It was produced by Brent McLachlan and the band.

== Critical reception ==
Professional ratings
Review scores
Source	Rating
AllMusic	4/5 stars
The Encyclopedia of Popular Music	4/5 stars
MusicHound Rock: The Essential Album Guide	4.5/5 stars
Spin Alternative Record Guide	6/10

Trouser Press called the album "monumental," writing: "Capturing all the hooky appeal and personal charm of their first records, it updates the recipe with seven years of instrumental mastery and superior sonics." The New York Times wrote that "the production is raw; the song structures are almost self-consciously unsophisticated - just jaunty guitar riffs, roughshod 4/4 rhythms and, in the more aggressive tracks, base lines that rumble and swell and even drown out the other instruments."

== Track listing ==
All tracks are written by the Bats/Robert Scott.

No.	Title	Length
1.	"Other Side of You"	3:10
2.	"Law of Things"	2:13
3.	"Never Said Goodbye"	2:33
4.	"Yawn Vibes"	3:40
5.	"Time to Get Ready"	4:16
6.	"Ten to One"	2:38
7.	"Mastery"	3:00
8.	"I Fall Away"	2:27
9.	"Cliff Edge"	3:05
10.	"Nine Days"	3:43
11.	"Bedlam"	3:28
12.	"Smoking Her Wings"	4:37

== Personnel ==
- Malcolm Grant – drums
- Paul Kean – bass
- Robert Scott – guitar, lead vocals
- Kaye Woodward – guitar, vocals

Also credited:

- Alastair Galbraith – violin (tracks: 1, 4 to 8, 12)
- Brent McLachlan – engineer, co-producer
