= Mister Pop =

Studio album by the Clean
- Released: 8 September 2009
- Genre: Indie pop
- Length: 34:06
- Label: Merge, Arch Hill

The Clean chronology
Anthology (2002)	Mister Pop (2009)

Mister Pop is the fifth and final studio album by New Zealand group the Clean, released 8 September 2009."Mister Pop". Bandcamp.

Professional ratings
Aggregate scores
Source	Rating
Metacritic	67%
Review scores
Source	Rating
AllMusic	3.5/5 stars
The A.V. Club	B
Dusted Magazine	(ambivalent)
Pitchfork	7.3/10
PopMatters	7/10
Tiny Mix Tapes	2.5/5 stars

== Track listing ==
No.	Title	Length
1.	"Loog"	3:44
2.	"Are You Really on Drugs?"	2:45
3.	"In the Dreamlife U Need a Rubber Soul"	3:27
4.	"Asleep in the Tunnel"	3:05
5.	"Back in the Day"	2:48
6.	"Moonjumper"	5:43
7.	"Factory Man"	2:23
8.	"Simple Fix"	3:54
9.	"Tensile"	3:29
10.	"All Those Notes"	2:55
