= Robot World =

Studio album by Bailter Space
- Released: 1993
- Recorded: 1992
- Genre: Noise rock, shoegazing
- Length: 45:04
- Label: Flying Nun, Matador

Bailter Space chronology
Thermos (1990)	Robot World (1993)	Vortura (1994)

Robot World is the fourth album by the New Zealand band Bailter Space, released in 1993. It was their first full-length album to be officially released in the U.S., and was distributed by WEA under Matador's first major-label deal (with Warner Bros. Records).

It was recorded (no producer is listed in the album credits) at Writhe Recording in Wellington, New Zealand, except for "Get Lost", which was recorded by Chris Julian at Calliope in New York. All tracks were mixed by Bailter Space at Writhe in September 1992.

"EIP" and alternate version of "Robot World" were released on the B.E.I.P. CD EP, along with two Vortura tracks, unreleased at the time.

== Critical reception ==
Professional ratings
Review scores
Source	Rating
AllMusic	3/5 stars
Select	4/5 medals

The New York Times deemed the album "a sleek, cool treasure of noise rock." The Washington Post noted that "'Begin' and 'Ore' are more exercises in rhythm-guitar tonalities than in melody or message."

== Track listing ==
1. "Begin" (3:35)
2. "Robot World" (4:19)
3. "Morning" (4:03)
4. "Be on Time" (5:14)
5. "Fascination" (1:48)
6. "Ore" (3:33)
7. "Get Lost" (6:01)
8. "EIP" (3:59)
9. "Orbit" (4:03)
10. "Make" (3:34)
11. "Remain" (4:55)
