= Made Up in Blue =

EP by The Bats
- Released: 1986
- Recorded: December 1985
- Studio: Point, London
- Genre: Dunedin sound, indie pop, alternative rock
- Label: Flying Nun
- Producer: The Bats, John Milton

The Bats chronology
And Here Is 'Music for the Fireside' (1985)	Made Up in Blue (1986)	Daddy's Highway (1987)

Made Up in Blue is a 1986 EP by New Zealand indie rock group the Bats.

== Recording and release ==
In 1985, the Bats were touring Britain and Germany, including playing support for Alex Chilton. They recorded the Made Up in Blue EP at the 24 track Point Studio in London in December 1985.

"Made Up in Blue" was the first single ever released in the U.K. by Flying Nun. It was awarded "Single of the Week" by the influential British magazine, NME.

== Additional releases ==
In 1990, Flying Nun released the first three Bats EPs as Compiletely Bats. The three tracks from Made Up in Blue were also added to CD reissues of the band's debut album, Daddy's Highway.

== Track listing ==
All songs written by Robert Scott.

Side one

1. "Made Up in Blue" – 4:00

Side two

1. "Trouble in This Town" – 2:25
2. "Mad on You" – 2:30

== Personnel ==
The Bats

- Robert Scott – guitar, lead vocals
- Kaye Woodward - guitars, vocals
- Paul Kean – bass guitar, vocals
- Malcolm Grant – drums

Technical

- Johnny Milton – engineer, co-producer
- The Bats – co-producers, musical arrangers
- Robert Raith – art
