= Foothills (album) =

Studio album by The Bats
- Released: 13 November 2020
- Recorded: October 2018
- Genre: Indie rock
- Length: 39:23
- Label: Flying Nun

The Bats chronology
The Deep Set (2017)	Foothills (2020)

Professional ratings
Aggregate scores
Source	Rating
Metacritic	80/100
Review scores
Source	Rating
AllMusic	4/5 stars
Spectrum Culture	72%
The Sydney Morning Herald	4/5 stars

Foothills is the tenth studio album by New Zealand band The Bats. It was released on 13 November 2020, through Flying Nun Records.

== Background ==
The album was recorded over the period of a week during spring 2018 at a pop-up studio in the Southern Alps of New Zealand.

== Critical reception ==
Foothills was met with "generally favorable" reviews from critics. At Metacritic, which assigns a weighted average rating out of 100 to reviews from mainstream publications, this release received an average score of 80 based on 4 reviews.

Writing for AllMusic, Fred Thomas wrote: "Over the course of Foothills, incredibly small production choices like these make a huge impact. Similar to the musical component, the lyrical content of Foothills is never too overt or heavy-handed. A band that's been active in relatively obscure circles for 38 years might be prone to tunes about growing older, nostalgia, or struggles with change, but if those expected themes appear, they come up more as emotional implications or nods to universal feelings instead of blunt statements." Jennifer Kelly of Dusted Magazine said: "Foothills further distills this soft-focus, rueful vision, purifies it and delivers exactly what you expect from this band, only a little prettier and more touching than the last time. At Spectrum Culture, Justin Cober-Lake noted: "The songs mediate between fanciful experiences, taking different routes but both suggesting the hopeful capabilities of active creativity. They play with a loose precision and a casual formalism that, even four decades in, continues to sound new, even if we can trace a lengthy musical history to it at this point."

== Track listing ==
Foothills track listing
No.	Title	Length
1.	"Trade in Silence"	3:16
2.	"Warwick"	2:40
3.	"Beneath the Visor"	2:50
4.	"Scrolling"	3:54
5.	"Another Door"	3:14
6.	"Red Car"	3:13
7.	"Field of Vision"	3:28
8.	"Change Is All"	3:14
9.	"As You Were"	3:17
10.	"Smaller Pieces"	3:49
11.	"Gone to Ground"	2:21
12.	"Electric Sea View"	4:07

== Charts ==
Chart performance for Foothills
Chart (2020)	Peak position
New Zealand Albums (RMNZ)	13
