= Vortura =

Studio album by Bailter Space
- Released: May 1994
- Recorded: 1993
- Genre: Noise rock, shoegazing
- Length: 45:36
- Label: Flying Nun Records, Matador Records
- Producer: Bailter Space and Paul Berry

Bailter Space chronology
Robot World (1993)	Vortura (1994)	Wammo (1995)

Professional ratings
Review scores
Source	Rating
AllMusic	4/5 stars

Vortura is the fourth album by New Zealand band Bailter Space. It was released in 1994. The songs were recorded at five studios, with all of the songs engineered by Bailter Space. The final tracks were produced by Bailter Space and Paul Berry.

Vortura is the band's heaviest album, lyrically and musically, and marked the first time they recorded an album outside of their native New Zealand. The song title "NO2" apparently is a reference to nitrogen dioxide, an air pollutant, though the song title is alternatively spelled as "No 2." "Projects" chastizes "you in your ivory tower" for living well, while "people in projects, people living simply" lead ignored lives; this song coincided with the band's move to New York City from New Zealand. "X" and "Projects" appeared on the B.E.I.P. EP, which came out several months in advance of Vortura. A live version of "Projects" also came out on the Retro EP in 1995.

== Track listing ==
All songs written by Bailter Space.

1. "Projects" – 5:06
2. "Process Paid" – 3:44
3. "X" – 4:47
4. "Voices" – 5:21
5. "NO2" – 3:26
6. "I.C.Y." – 2:30
7. "Dark Blue" – 3:14
8. "Shadow" – 4:03
9. "Galaxy" – 4:44
10. "Reactor" – 3:15
11. "Control" – 5:26

== Personnel ==
- Alister Parker – guitar, vocals
- John Halvorsen – guitar, bass, vocals
- Brent McLachlan – drums, sampler
