= Wammo =

Studio album by Bailter Space
- Released: 1995
- Length: 38:35
- Label: Flying Nun; Matador
- Producer: Rod Hui; Bailter Space

Bailter Space chronology
Vortura (1994)	Wammo (1995)	Capsul (1997)

Wammo is an album by New Zealand band Bailter Space, released in 1995. It reached number 31 in New Zealand upon original release. Matador Records reissued the album on vinyl in 2021 for its 25th anniversary, after which it reached a new peak of number 23 in New Zealand.

== Critical reception ==
Professional ratings
Review scores
Source	Rating
AllMusic	3/5 stars
Alternative Rock	8/10 stars
Melody Maker	Recommended

Andrew Earles, in Gimme Indie Rock: 500 Essential American Underground Rock Albums 1981-1996, wrote that "Bailter Space's final album for Matador (fifth overall) finds the band showing everyone how skilled it was at erasing any lines of demarcation separating wickedly catchy pop songs and washes of guitar noise and toothy dynamics." Dave Thompson, in Alternative Rock, called it "their most conventional hook-laden missive yet."

== Track listing ==
1. "Untied" – 3:28
2. "Splat" – 3:49
3. "At Five We Drive" – 3:08
4. "Zapped" – 2:11
5. "Colours" – 3:58
6. "Retro" – 4:29
7. "Glimmer" – 4:07
8. "Voltage" – 4:36
9. "D Thing" – 6:24
10. "Wammo" – 2:25

== Charts ==
Chart performance for Wammo
Chart (1995)	Peak position
New Zealand Albums (RMNZ)	31
Chart (2021)	Peak position
New Zealand Albums (RMNZ)	23
