= Fear of God (The Bats album) =

Studio album by the Bats
- Released: 1991
- Recorded: Jan–Mar 1991
- Genre: Dunedin sound; jangle pop
- Length: 40 minutes
- Label: Flying Nun; Mammoth
- Producer: Nick Sansano

The Bats chronology
The Law of Things (1990)	Fear of God (1991)	Silverbeet (1993)

Fear of God is the third album by the New Zealand band the Bats, released in 1991. It was their first album to be distributed by Mammoth.

The tracks "The Black and the Blue" and "Boogey Man" were released as singles, and the album peaked at No. 43 in the New Zealand charts.

== Critical reception ==
Professional ratings
Review scores
Source	Rating
AllMusic	4/5 stars
Robert Christgau	(2-star Honorable Mention)

Trouser Press wrote that "thanks in part to producer Nicholas Sansano (Sonic Youth, Public Enemy), the album dissipates the cloudiness hovering over the Bats' earlier work (which was never an entirely bad thing), while respecting the crisp arrangements and sugary melodic centers." Stereo Review noted the "cute jangly guitars, cute pop hooks, cute rough-hewn vocals."

== Track listing ==
All tracks are written by the Bats/Robert Scott.

No.	Title	Length
1.	"Boogey Man"	3:08
2.	"The Black and the Blue"	3:05
3.	"Dancing as the Boat Goes Down"	3:06
4.	"The Old Ones"	3:23
5.	"Hold All the Butter"	2:45
6.	"Fear of God"	3:00
7.	"It's a Lie"	2:48
8.	"Straight Image"	2:35
9.	"Watch the Walls"	4:18
10.	"You Know We Shouldn't"	2:13
11.	"Jetsam"	4:26
12.	"The Looming Past"	3:56

== Personnel ==
- Malcolm Grant - drums, percussion
- Paul Kean - bass
- Robert Scott - guitar, lead vocals, painting (cover)
- Kaye Woodward - guitar, vocals

Also credited:

- Nick "The Chair" Caiano - guitar
- Glenn Fitton - percussion
- Alan Starrett - viola, accordion ("Straight Image")
- Nick Sansano - percussion [cheap], accordion ("The Looming Past")
- Craig McGill - illustration
