= Nelsh Bailter Space =

EP by Bailter Space
- Released: 1987
- Genre: Indie rock
- Label: Flying Nun - FN094
- Producer: Brent McLachlan

Bailter Space chronology
Nelsh Bailter Space (1987)	Tanker (1988)

Professional ratings
Review scores
Source	Rating
AllMusic	3/5 stars

Nelsh Bailter Space is an EP by New Zealand band Bailter Space, released in 1987. It peaked at number 39 on the New Zealand Singles Chart.

== Critical reception ==
Trouser Press wrote that "right from the band's debut EP, Nelsh, guitarist ~~John Halvorsen~~ [Alister Parker] specialized in an abrasive, almost pitchless assault that could feel as polished and smooth as sheet metal, and his foils ... worked to feed that sound, contributing feedback gales and arty, disjointed backbeats that never felt fully settled." The Spin Alternative Record Guide called it "whiskey-sour pop sludge," singling out "El Whizzo".

== Track listing ==
Side A

1. "New Man"
2. "El Whizzo (And Then)"
3. "Our Aim"

Side B

1. "I'm In Love With These Times" (Written By Hamish Kilgour, David Kilgour, Peter Gutteridge)
2. "Separate Circles"
3. "Now I Will Live"

== Personnel ==
- Ross Humphries (bass)
- Hamish Kilgour (drums)
- Alister Parker (guitar, vocals)
- Glenda Bills (keyboards)
