= And Here Is 'Music for the Fireside' =

EP by The Bats
- Released: 1985
- Recorded: January, February, April 1985
- Studio: Nightshift Studios (Christchurch, New Zealand)
- Genre: Dunedin sound, indie pop, alternative rock
- Label: Flying Nun

The Bats chronology
By Night (1984)	And Here Is 'Music for the Fireside' (1985)	Made Up in Blue (1986)

Professional ratings
Review scores
Source	Rating
AllMusic	4/5 stars
The Encyclopedia of Popular Music	3/5 stars
Spin Alternative Record Guide	7/10

And Here Is 'Music for the Fireside' is a 1985 EP by New Zealand indie rock group The Bats.

Flying Nun released the first three Bats EPs as Compiletely Bats.

== Critical reception ==
AllMusic called the EP "another classic, flawless piece of the stunning mid-'80s Flying Nun pop puzzle." Trouser Press wrote that it spans "from lackadaisical laments to sweeping, enticing rushes of pure pop satisfaction, each made all the more appealing by Scott’s nasal, high register vocals."

== Track listing ==
All tracks are written by Robert Scott

Side 1
No.	Title	Length
1.	"Earwig"	2:49
2.	"Chicken Bird Run"	2:50
3.	"Blindfold"	2:59
4.	"Joes Again"	2:58

Side 2
No.	Title	Length
5.	"Offside"	3:03
6.	"Claudine"	3:13
7.	"Neighbours"	3:10

== Personnel ==
- Malcolm Grant - drums, percussion
- Paul Kean - backing vocals, bass, guitar (on "Chicken Bird Run")
- Robert Scott - vocals, guitar
- Kaye Woodward - backing vocals, guitar, bass (on "Chicken Bird Run")

Also credited:

- Alastair Galbraith - violin on "Chicken Bird Run", "Blindfold" and "Neighbours".
- Arnold Von Bussell - assistant engineer
