= Capsul =

Studio album by Bailter Space
- Released: 1997
- Label: Flying Nun; Turnbuckle
- Producer: Bailter Space

Bailter Space chronology
Wammo (1995)	Capsul (1997)	Photon (EP) (1998)

Professional ratings
Review scores
Source	Rating
AllMusic	4/5 stars

Capsul is an album by New Zealand band Bailter Space. It was released in 1997.

== Track listing ==
1. "Shield" - 03:40
2. "Pass It Up" - 03:27
3. "So La" - 03:32
4. "Dome" - 03:49
5. "Capsule" - 03:53
6. "Tag" - 04:25
7. "Collider" - 03:42
8. "Velo" - 02:42
9. "Picking Up" - 05:06
10. "Argonaut" - 06:56
11. "II" - 05:12
12. "The Sun" - 04:09
13. "Shades" - 03:03
14. "GA 9" - 04:16

== Personnel ==
- John Halvorsen (bass guitar, vocals)
- Brent McLachlan (drums, sampler)
- Alister Parker (guitar, vocals, sampler)
