= Spill the Beans =

Spill The Beans

EP by The Bats
- Released: 1994
- Recorded: August 25–26, 1993, Duck-Kee Studios, Raleigh, NC; February 1994, Nightshift Studios, Christchurch
- Genre: Dunedin sound, indie pop, alternative rock
- Length: 17:29 (CD)
- Label: Flying Nun Records FN291, FNCD291
- Producer: The Bats

The Bats chronology
Silverbeet (1993)	Spill The Beans (1994)	Couchmaster (1995)

Professional ratings
Review scores
Source	Rating
Allmusic	link

Spill the Beans is an EP released in 1994 by New Zealand band The Bats.

The EP was released in two versions - a 3-track 7" and a 5-track CD. The 7" included a live version of "Sir Queen", from their 1987 album, Daddy's Highway, which was recorded live-to-air on WFMU, East Orange, New Jersey in July 1993.

Unusually, band members Paul Kean and Kaye Woodward swapped roles for two of the tracks, Kean playing guitar and Woodward bass on "Spill The Beans" and "Give In To The Sands".

== Track listing ==
All tracks are written by The Bats/Robert Scott

7" Vinyl
No.	Title	Length
1.	"Under The Law"	4:34
2.	"Spill The Beans"	2:38
3.	"Sir Queen (Live)"

CD
No.	Title	Length
1.	"Under The Law"	4:34
2.	"Spill The Beans"	2:38
3.	"Empty Head"	4:09
4.	"Make It Clear"	3:18
5.	"Give In To The Sands"	2:47

== Personnel ==
- Malcolm Grant - drums
- Paul Kean - bass, vocals, guitar
- Robert Scott - guitar, lead vocals
- Kaye Woodward - guitar, vocals, bass

Also credited:

- Mac McCaughan - wah guitar ("Empty Head")
- Brad Morrison - engineer ("Sir Queen (Live)")
- Arnie Van Bussel - engineer ("Under the Law")
