= Left by Soft =

Studio album by Heavy Eights
- Released: 2011
- Genre: Pop, Rock
- Length: 38:38
- Label: Merge

Professional ratings
Aggregate scores
Source	Rating
Metacritic	80/100
Review scores
Source	Rating
AllMusic	4.5/5 stars
PopMatters	(7/10)

Left by Soft is a studio album by David Kilgour and the Heavy Eights. It was released in April 2011 under Merge Records. In 2011, the album debuted on the NZ Top 40 at #31.

== Track list ==
No.	Title	Length
1.	"Left by Soft"	3:30
2.	"Way Down Here"	3:58
3.	"A Break in the Weather"	3:09
4.	"Steel Arrow"	2:40
5.	"Pop Song"	3:15
6.	"Autumn Sun"	4:19
7.	"Theme"	2:23
8.	"Diamond Mine"	6:09
9.	"I'll Walk Back Up That Hill"	2:10
10.	"Could Be on My Way"	2:54
11.	"Purple Balloon"	4:11
