= Anthology (The Clean album) =

Compilation album by The Clean
- Released: 2002
- Genres: Indie rock, lo-fi, alternative rock
- Length: 134:46
- Labels: Flying Nun, Merge Records

The Clean chronology
Getaway (2001)	Anthology (2002)	Mister Pop (2009)

Professional ratings
Review scores
Source	Rating
Allmusic	4.5/5 stars
Stylus	A+
Pitchfork	(8.5/10)

Anthology is a collection of early material by the New Zealand band The Clean, most of which had previously been out of print and hard to find. It was released by Flying Nun Records in 2002.

The band's early releases, which had been only available on vinyl in the early 1980s, are included in their entirety. Anthology opens with the two tracks from The Clean's debut single, "Tally Ho!", all five tracks of the Boodle Boodle Boodle EP, and all seven from Great Sounds Great, Good Sounds Good, So-so Sounds So-so, Bad Sounds Bad, Rotten Sounds Rotten. "At the Bottom" and "Getting Older" were released as a 7" 45 rpm single in 1983.

== Track listing ==
Disc one
No.	Title	Length
1.	"Tally Ho!"	2:42
2.	"Platypus"	3:17
3.	"Billy Two"	2:23
4.	"Thumbs Off"	2:59
5.	"Anything Could Happen"	2:39
6.	"Sad Eyed Lady"	3:03
7.	"Point That Thing Somewhere Else"	5:28
8.	"Fish"	2:24
9.	"Flowers"	3:26
10.	"Side On"	2:03
11.	"Slug Song"	3:20
12.	"Beatnik"	1:57
13.	"End of My Dream"	4:09
14.	"On Again/Off Again"	1:47
15.	"At the Bottom"	3:51
16.	"Getting Older"	4:18
17.	"Scrap Music"	1:31
18.	"Whatever I Do Is Right"	2:32
19.	"Two Fat Sisters (live)"	2:55
20.	"Odditty"	2:34
21.	"Quickstep (live)"	5:53
22.	"At the Bottom (live)"	3:26

Disc two
No.	Title	Length
1.	"Draw(in)g to a (W)hole"	2:04
2.	"I Wait Around"	2:41
3.	"The Blue"	1:47
4.	"Some One"	1:53
5.	"Big Soft Punch"	2:33
6.	"Diamond Shine"	3:14
7.	"Big Cat"	1:42
8.	"Outside the Cage"	5:07
9.	"Safe in the Rain"	2:56
10.	"Secret Place"	3:33
11.	"Do Your Thing"	4:14
12.	"Linger Longer"	2:27
13.	"Too Much Violence"	3:50
14.	"Trapped in Amber"	3:16
15.	"Psychedelic Ranger"	2:50
16.	"Late Last Night"	2:49
17.	"Ludwig"	2:11
18.	"Wipe Me, I'm Lucky"	3:11
19.	"Franz Kafka at the Zoo"	1:58
20.	"Clutch"	2:16
21.	"Balkans"	1:20
22.	"Indigo Blue"	2:33
23.	"Chumpy"	3:46
24.	"Twist Top"	2:04

== Charts ==
Chart (2002–2014)	Peak position
New Zealand Albums (RMNZ)	33
