= At the National Grid =

Studio album by The Bats
- Released: 2005
- Recorded: National Grid, Christchurch, New Zealand
- Genres: Dunedin sound, indie pop, alternative rock
- Length: 42:44
- Labels: Pocket Music; Little Teddy Recordings
- Producer: The Bats

The Bats chronology
Couchmaster (1995)	At the National Grid (2005)	The Guilty Office (2008)

Alternative cover
- Alternate cover used on German release

Professional ratings
Review scores
Source	Rating
Allmusic	4/5 stars

At the National Grid is the sixth album by New Zealand band The Bats, released in 2005. It was the band's first album for ten years and the first to be released on a New Zealand label other than Flying Nun Records.

== Recording and release ==
The rhythm tracks were recorded to analogue at The National Grid studio, in Christchurch, New Zealand. The tracks were then digitised with overdubs and mixing by Paul Kean with input from the band. In New Zealand, the album was released on The Bats' own newly formed Pocket Music label. It was released in the US by Magic Marker, in Germany by Little Teddy (with different artwork and also on vinyl), in the UK by Egg Records and in Australia by Reverberation.

== Reception ==
Tim Sendra at Allmusic gave it 4 stars, writing, "...having the group back at such a high level is as refreshing as a plunge into an ice-cold mountain stream." It had airplay on many college radio stations in the US, leading to an appearance at the 2006 SXSW Festival in Austin.

CMJ New Music Monthly said, "Grid celebrates the virtues of patience. Most of its tracks sport the same folk-laced fireside charm as the Bats' earliest work, yet somehow sidestep rehash. Scott's and guitarist Kaye Woodward's voices have aged into wonderful harmonic foils, converting an early band weakness into a newfound strength."

== Track listing ==
All tracks are written by Robert Scott/The Bats, except as noted.

No.	Title	Length
1.	"Western Isles"	2:49
2.	"Horizon"	4:43
3.	"Hubert"	2:11
4.	"The Bells Are Ringing"	3:31
5.	"Single File"	3:02
6.	"Pre War Blues"	4:37
7.	"The Rays"	3:13
8.	"Things I Can't Leave Behind"	2:56
9.	"Mir" (Kaye Woodward)	3:27
10.	"Up To The Sky"	2:56
11.	"We Do Not Kiss The Ones We Kick"	2:19
12.	"The Flowers And The Trees"	3:57
13.	"Crazy Crowd"	2:59
Total length:		42:44

== Personnel ==
- Malcolm Grant - drums
- Paul Kean - bass guitar, guitar, backing vocals
- Robert Scott - guitar, vocals, piano
- Kaye Woodward - guitar, bass guitar, vocals

Also credited:

- Alastair Galbraith - violin (tracks 6 & 12)
- John Kelcher - engineer
