= Courage Investment Group =

Bermuda shipping company

Courage Investment Group Limited
- Industry: Shipping
- Founded: 2001
- Key people: Hsu Chih-Chien Chairman, Wu Chao-Huan Managing Director
- Website: www.courageinv.com

Courage Investment Group Limited (short form: Courage Investment, SGX: CIN , SEHK: 1145), founded in June 2001, is a Bermuda registered shipping company engaged in the ownership and operation of bulk carriers. It owns and operates eight bulk carriers, including five Handysize carriers between 25,000 and 50,000 deadweight tons (“dwt”) and three Panamax vessels of about 65,000 dwt. The total tonnage of these vessels is approximately 398,108 dwt.

The company provides marine transportation services and logistical support, carrying bulk commodities such as cement wood chips, coal, iron ore and minerals. The fleet operates mainly in Asian waters, including China, Taiwan and elsewhere in Asia.

Courage Investment launched an IPO on Singapore's SGX Mainboard in 2005. Moreover, the company has been rated one of the world’s top 10 public shipping companies by Marine Money International in terms of overall performance for third year in a row. In 2008, the company was also selected as one of the "Best Under A Billion" companies by Forbes Asia.

== Fleet ==
Vessel	Type	Dwt	Flag
Bravery	Handysize	35,676	Panama
Courage	Panamax	66,754	Panama
Heroic	Handysize	41,538	Panama
Jeannie III	Handysize	34,537	Panama
Raffles	Handysize	37,696	Panama
Sea Pioneer	Panamax	66,798	Panama
Valour	Panamax	66,754	Panama
Zorina	Handysize	48,355	Panama
	TOTAL:	398,108	

== See also ==
- Shipping
