= Doug Hood =

New Zealand music producer and engineer (1953–2024)

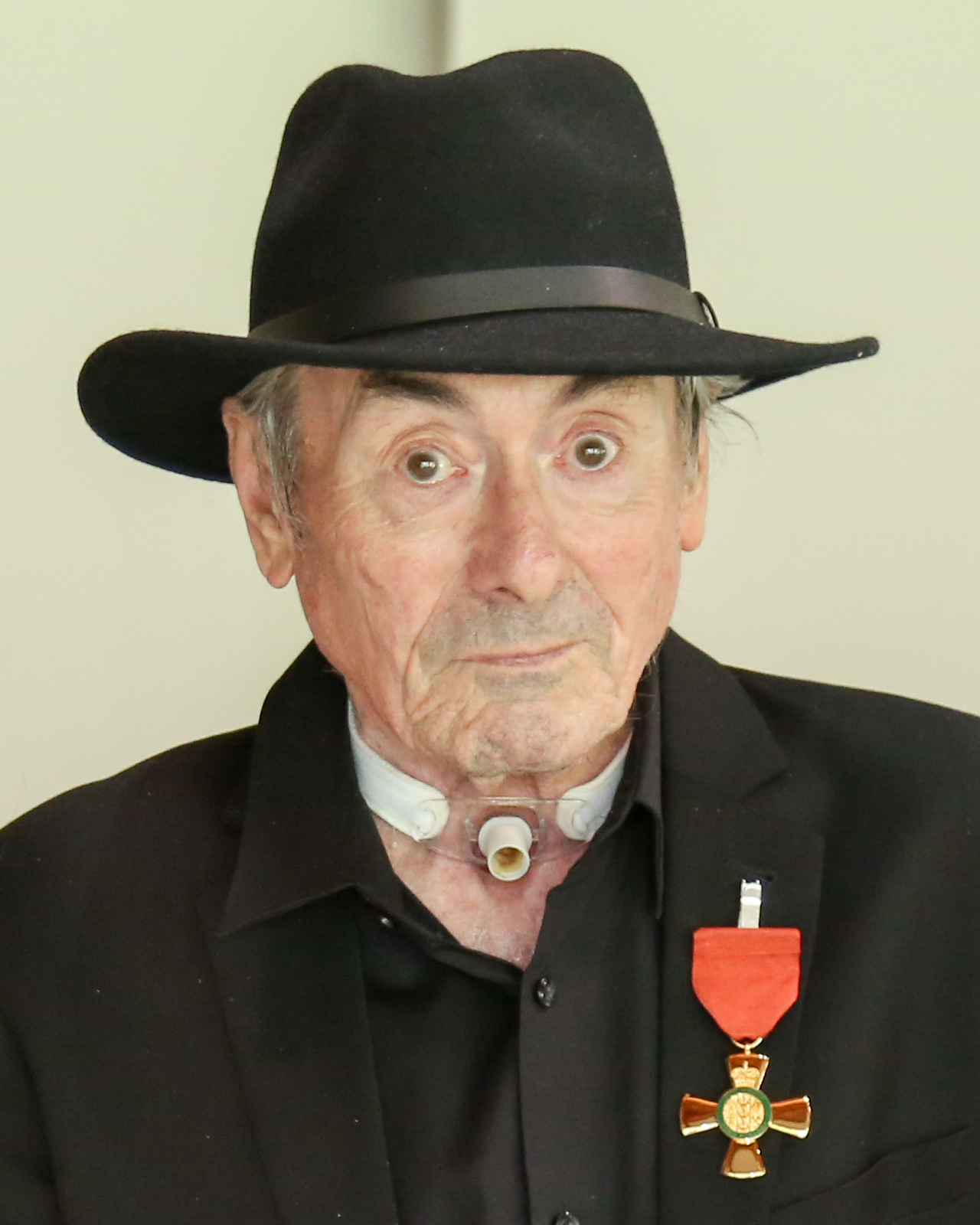
Doug Hood, at his ONZM investiture, 2023

Douglas Henry Hood ONZM (19 October 1953 – 10 September 2024) was a New Zealand music producer and engineer. One of the leading figures behind the Flying Nun Records label, he was recording engineer on many of the label's hits.

== Biography ==
Hood was born in Te Kūiti on 19 October 1953. His career in music began as a member of The Clean, before he moved behind the recording desk working initially alongside Chris Knox to record some of the Flying Nun label's earliest singles.

Hood later moved into music promotion, founding the company Looney Tours, which was responsible for bringing artists including Billy Bragg, Violent Femmes, New Order, Public Image Ltd and the Big Day Out festival to New Zealand.

Hood was appointed an Officer of the New Zealand Order of Merit (ONZM) in the 2023 King's Birthday and Coronation Honours, for services to the music industry. He died after a long battle with cancer on 10 September 2024, at the age of 70.

Hood's recording credits include:

- The Builders: Beatin Hearts
- The Chills: "Rolling Moon", "Pink Frost", "I Love My Leather Jacket", Kaleidoscope World
- The Clean: Boodle Boodle Boodle, Great Sounds Great, "Getting Older"
- MGMT: LateNightTales
- Nocturnal Projections: Inmates In Images
- Sneaky Feelings: "Be My Friend"
- Tall Dwarfs: Three Songs EP, Hello Cruel World
- The Verlaines: 10 O'Clock In The Afternoon, Juvenilia
- Various Artists: Dunedin Double EP
