= Boodle Boodle Boodle =

- Original LP cover art.

EP by The Clean
- Released: November 1981
- Recorded: 7–8 September 1981
- Genre: Indie rock, lo-fi, Dunedin sound, garage pop
- Length: 16:32
- Label: Flying Nun Records FN003
- Producer: Chris Knox, Doug Hood

The Clean chronology
| Boodle Boodle Boodle (1981) | Great Sounds Great, Good Sounds Good, So-so Sounds So-so, Bad Sounds Bad, Rotten Sounds Rotten (1982) |

Boodle Boodle Boodle is a 12" EP by New Zealand band The Clean. Released by Flying Nun Records in 1981, it is one of the more important releases in the Dunedin sound genre. The EP reached number five in the New Zealand music charts, despite being listed in the singles chart (New Zealand has never had a separate EP chart), and stayed in the top 20 for nearly six months.

As Flying Nun's first major success, it was largely responsible for the label's continued survival and the start of its growth into New Zealand's most important independent label.

Several of the songs on the EP became very popular parts of The Clean's repertoire, with "Anything Could Happen" in particular becoming one of their trademark songs.

Chris Knox drew the EP's cover, which was based on a promotional photo of the three band members in a bathtub.

== Track listing ==
Side one
| No. | Title | Length |
|---|---|---|
| 1. | "Billy Two" | 2:20 |
| 2. | "Thumbs Off" | 3:00 |
| 3. | "Anything Could Happen" | 2:38 |

Side two
| No. | Title | Length |
|---|---|---|
| 1. | "Sad Eyed Lady" | 3:04 |
| 2. | "Point That Thing Somewhere Else" | 5:30 |

All songs were written by Kilgour/Kilgour/Scott except "Point That Thing Somewhere Else", which was written by Peter Gutteridge/Kilgour/Kilgour. All tracks from the EP except for "Thumbs Off" were later released on compact disc as part of the compilation album Compilation. All five tracks later appeared on the 2-CD compilation Anthology.

== Charts ==
| Chart (1981–82) | Peak position |
|---|---|
| New Zealand (Recorded Music NZ) | 5 |
