= Bravery (disambiguation) =

Bravery is the choice and willingness to confront agony, pain, danger, uncertainty, or intimidation.

Bravery may also refer to:

- The Bravery, a rock band from the United States
  - The Bravery (album), a 2005 album by the band
