= Unknown Country =

Studio album by the Clean
- Released: November 1996
- Genre: Alternative rock, indie rock
- Length: 44:36
- Label: Flying Nun

The Clean chronology
Modern Rock (1994)	Unknown Country (1996)	Getaway (2001)

Unknown Country is an album by New Zealand group the Clean, released in 1996.

== Critical reception ==
Professional ratings
Review scores
Source	Rating
AllMusic	2/5 stars
Robert Christgau	(dud)

CMJ wrote that "it's incredibly easy to be struck by how peculiar this record is, and easier still to forget that The Clean has been doing inventive, experimental, and, well, strange things in its music all along."

== Track listing ==
No.	Title	Length
1.	"Wipe Me, I'm Lucky"	3:14
2.	"Champagne & Misery"	2:45
3.	"Changing Your Head"	3:14
4.	"Balkans"	1:18
5.	"Clutch"	2:14
6.	"Franz Kafka at the Zoo"	1:58
7.	"Whisk"	1:29
8.	"Indigo Blue"	2:34
9.	"Chumpy"	3:47
10.	"Get the Liquid"	2:51
11.	"Happy Lil Fella"	2:12
12.	"Tweezer"	0:47
13.	"Rope"	2:59
14.	"Twist Top"	2:04
15.	"Cooking Water"	3:58
16.	"Valley Cab"	2:07
17.	"Wall Walk"	3:38
18.	"Balkans"	1:26

== Charts ==
Chart (1996–2021)	Peak position
New Zealand Albums (RMNZ)	39
