= Snapper (band) =

New Zealand band

- Origin: Dunedin, New Zealand
- Genres: Indie rock, experimental rock, Dunedin sound
- Years active: 1988–1996
- Label: Flying Nun
- Past members: Mike Dooley; Alan Haig; Peter Gutteridge; Dominic Stones; Christine Voice

Snapper were a New Zealand band that formed in Dunedin in 1988. They released two studio albums.

== Discography ==
=== Albums ===
List of albums
Title	Album details
Shotgun Blossom	Released: 1990; Label: Flying Nun Records (FNCD216); Format: CD, LP, Cassette
ADM	Released: 1996; Label: Flying Nun Records (FNCD294); Format: CD, LP, Cassette

=== Extended plays ===
List of EPs, with New Zealand chart positions
Title	Album details	Peak chart positions
Title	Album details	NZ
Snapper	Released: 1988; Label: Flying Nun Records (FN010); Format: 12" LP	49
