= Couchmaster =

Studio album by The Bats
- Released: 1995
- Recorded: June–July 1995 at Nightshift Studios, Christchurch, New Zealand
- Genres: Dunedin sound, jangle pop, indie rock, alternative rock
- Length: 52:43
- Label: Flying Nun Records
- Producer: The Bats

The Bats chronology
Spill the Beans (1994)	Couchmaster (1995)	At the National Grid (2005)

Professional ratings
Review scores
Source	Rating
Allmusic	3.5/5 stars

Couchmaster is the fifth album by New Zealand band the Bats, released in 1995. It was their last studio album release for ten years.

"Afternoon in Bed" was released as a CD single that included three additional non-album tracks.

== Composition ==
Main writer Scott said, "I was going through a breakup with my partner at the time I was writing, so I made the lyrics pretty dark. Musically, I prefer minor keys, and there's a few different tunings as well, so that gives it an extra edge. We didn't go into the studio and think we were going to make a dour, dark album — that was just how it came out, the way we ended up playing them."

== Reception ==
CMJ New Music Monthly said the album "eschews fuzziness and grinding noises to craft carefully sensitive, harmony-heavy, sparkling, introspective guitar tunes that manage to sound happy-go-lucky even when Scott sings about malevolent childhood specters, lost loves or fear of flying." AllMusic said it was when the band, "finally move from being simply a very good group with inspired moments to a great band, flat out. Scott's still wistful, still questioning lyrics are as strong as ever, and the band sounds newly energized."

== Track listing ==
All tracks are written by Robert Scott, except as noted.

No.	Title	Length
1.	"Outside"	0:52
2.	"Afternoon in Bed"	5:13
3.	"Around You Like Snow"	2:40
4.	"Work It Out"	2:50
5.	"Train"	0:48
6.	"Land o' Lakes"	3:44
7.	"Chain Home Low" (The Bats)	3:03
8.	"Supernova"	3:29
9.	"Shoeshine" (The Bats, Kaye Woodward)	3:42
10.	"Crow Song" (The Bats)	5:57
11.	"Smorgasboard" (The Bats)	1:35
12.	"Knowledge is Power"	4:05
13.	"It's Happening to You"	3:03
14.	"Lost Weekend"	2:43
15.	"For the Ride"	3:42
16.	"Out of Bounds"	3:27
17.	"Down to Me"	3:13

== Personnel ==
- Malcolm Grant - drums, percussion
- Paul Kean - bass, guitar, backing vocals, ukulele
- Robert Scott - vocals, guitar, keyboards
- Kaye Woodward - guitar, vocals

Also credited:

- Crispin Vinnell - French horn
- Arnie Van Bussel - engineer
