= Bailter Space =

New Zealand rock band

- Bailter Space in 1994

Background information
- Also known as: Nelsh Bailter Space, Bailterspace
- Origin: Christchurch, New Zealand
- Genres: Noise rock, shoegazing, space rock
- Years active: 1987–2004, 2008, 2012–present
- Labels: Flying Nun, Matador, Clawfist, Turnbuckle, Arch Hill, Fire
- Spinoff of: The Gordons, The Clean
- Members: Alister Parker; John Halvorsen
- Past members: Brent McLachlan; Hamish Kilgour; Ross Humphries; Glenda Bills; Todd Lindner; Ian Ljungquist

Bailter Space (a.k.a. Bailterspace) is a New Zealand shoegaze and noise rock band that formed in Christchurch in 1987 as Nelsh Bailter Space; they had previously recorded as the Gordons. Its members are Alister Parker (guitar, bass), John Halvorsen (bass, guitar), and Brent McLachlan (drums/percussion, samples). After releasing seven studio albums, numerous EPs/singles and a career retrospective compilation, Bailter Space went on an extended hiatus in 2004. They returned in August 2008 to play the Bowery Ballroom in Manhattan.

== History ==
Halvorsen, Parker, and McLachlan were in a band called the Gordons formed by John Halvorsen in 1980. The Gordons released the three-song Future Shock EP in 1981, along with a video for the song "Adults and Children". Their debut self-titled LP The Gordons came out later that year. The band then released the Volume 2 LP in 1984, with Vince Pinker on bass in the absence of Alister, before disbanding circa 1985. Flying Nun Europe (and subsequently Flying Nun proper) reissued The Gordons and Future Shock on one CD, while Volume 2 remains unavailable.

Nelsh Bailter Space was formed by Parker and former Clean drummer Hamish Kilgour in 1987, initially completing the line-up with Glenda Bills on keyboards and Ross Humphries (also of the Terminals, and formerly of the Pin Group), later shortening its name to Bailter Space. After a couple of singles, Bills and Humphries left, with Halvorsen joining on bass, this line-up recording the Tanker album and the "Grader Spader" single, both produced by Brent McLachlan. The band travelled to the United States where they played at the New Music Seminar in 1988, and when they returned, Kilgour opted to stay there with his new wife and form a new band, The Mad Scene. Parker and Halvorsen recruited McLachlan as the new drummer, recreating the original Gordons lineup. This line-up debuted with the Thermos album, recorded in 1989.

After several releases on Flying Nun, and after changing base several times between New Zealand, Germany, and the US, New York City indie label Matador Records signed them for release in the United States, in approximately 1990. The 1992 EP The Aim was the band's first official U.S. release, and was released as two separate 7-inch singles in the UK, with both awarded "Single of the Week" by Melody Maker. The band moved to New York City during the 1993 Robot World sessions. The EIP EP was released, containing slightly-remixed versions of two Robot World tracks and two that would appear on the forthcoming Vortura. Vortura would be followed a year later by Wammo. In 1999 the band performed in Toronto as part of the Neon Palm Festival.

After this, their U.S. releases came out on NYC-based label Turnbuckle Records, which folded circa 2002. In 2004, Matador Records deleted all Bailter Space releases from their catalog. The band's releases are now out of print, except for in New Zealand / Australia.

A career-spanning retrospective compilation, Bailterspace, was issued in 2004.

In August 2008, Bailter Space emerged from a 4-year hiatus to perform live at the Bowery Ballroom in New York City. They were joined by new recruit Ian Ljungquist (of Me You Us Them) filling in on the bass.

A new album entitled Strobosphere was released in New Zealand on 13 August 2012 and in the United States on 21 August 2012.

Drummer Brent McLachlan (August 6, 1961 — December 11, 2025) died from cancer in December 2025.

== Musical style ==
The band have often been compared to Sonic Youth, and they were once described as "The Sonic Youth of the Southern Hemisphere", with Trouser Press describing their early sound as "hard, droning, unforgiving guitar music with occasional lapses into verse/chorus regularity". By Tanker their sound had become more conventional. With their relocation to New York, their sound also shifted, with the band's next releases described as "an unholy collision between The Beatles harmonies and The Velvet Underground dissonance", with Parker stating at the time that the band were getting into "the harmonic value of distortion; we started to be very particular about where we set the instruments up and the angles the sounds were bouncing at. From these harmonic experiments I became more interested in the actual melodic content of the music". Pitchfork Media described them in 1999 as "a huge mess of sound that's simultaneously beautiful, jagged, atonal, and supremely melodic", while another review in the same year described their sound as "one part Superchunk, one part Pixies, and one part Dinosaur Jr."

== Discography ==
=== As 'The Gordons' ===
Studio albums

- The Gordons (1981, Gordons)
- Volume 2 (1984, Gordons)

EP

- Future Shock (1980, Gordons)

Compilations

- The Gordons (1988, Flying Nun)

=== Studio albums ===
| Title | Album details | Peak chart positions | |
| Title | Album details | NZ | US CMJ |
|---|---|---|---|
| Tanker | Released: 1988; Label: Flying Nun Records (FNCD107, OLE 136); Note: Reissued on Matador Records with Nelsh EP on one CD, 1995 | — | — |
| Thermos | Released: 1990; Label: Flying Nun (reissued on Matador, 1995) (FNCD142, OLE 135) | — | — |
| Robot World | Released: 1993; Label: Matador / Flying Nun (FNCD259, OLE 50) | 34 | — |
| Vortura | Released: 1994; Label: Matador / Flying Nun (FNCD295, OLE 93) | 22 | — |
| Wammo | Released: 1995; Label: Matador / Flying Nun (FNCD325, OLE 142) | 23 | 13 |
| Capsul | Released: 1997; Label: Turnbuckle Records (TR 5, FNCD375) | 34 | — |
| Solar.3 | Released: 1999; Label: Turnbuckle / Wildside Records (TR 17, space002) | — | 57 |
| Strobosphere | Released: 2012; Label: Arch Hill Music / Fire Records (AHR052) | — | — |
| Trinine | Released: 2013; Label: Fire (FIRECD270) | — | — |
| Concret | Released: 2021; Label: P+C bailterspace 2019 | | |
"—" denotes a recording that did not chart or was not released in that territory.

=== EPs ===
| Title | EP details | Peak chart positions |
| Title | EP details | NZ |
|---|---|---|
| Nelsh Bailter Space | Released: 1987; Label: Flying Nun (FN094) | 39 |
| The Aim | Released: 1992; Label: Flying Nun (FN232) | — |
| Photon | Released: 1998; Label: Turnbuckle (TB-012) | — |
"—" denotes a recording that did not chart or was not released in that territory.

=== Singles ===
| Year | Title | Tracks | Label | Peak chart positions | Album |
| Year | Title | Tracks | Label | NZ | Album |
|---|---|---|---|---|---|
| 1987 | "New Man" | "New Man", "In a City Wardrobe" | Flying Nun FN096 | — | Nelsh Bailter Space |
| 1988 | "Grader Spader" | "Grader Spader", "The Escalator Song", "N.B.S." | Flying Nun FN106 | — | Tanker |
| 1992 | "The Aim" | "The Aim", "We Know" | Clawfist HUNKA 16 | 43 | The Aim |
| 1992 | "Shine" | "Shine", "The Unseen" | Clawfist HUNKA 16 | — | The Aim |
| 1993 | "B.E.I.P." | "X", "Projects", "Robot World", "E I P" | Flying Nun FNCD284 | 45 | Robot World |
| 1995 | "Splat" | "Splat", "Retro", "At Five We Drive", "Fascination" | Flying Nun FNCD328 | 48 | Wammo |
| 1995 | "Retro" | "Retro", "Projects (Live)", "Begin (Live)" | Flying Nun FNCD345 | — | Wammo |
| 1997 | "Capsul" | "The Capsul", "Argonaut" | Turnbuckle TR-003 | — | Capsul |
"—" denotes a recording that did not chart or was not released in that territory.

=== Compilation ===
| Title | Album details | Peak chart positions |
| Title | Album details | NZ |
|---|---|---|
| Bailterspace | Released: 2004; Label: Flying Nun (FNCD484) | — |
"—" denotes a recording that did not chart or was not released in that territory.
