= Daddy's Highway =

Studio album by the Bats
- Released: 1987
- Recorded: 1986–1987
- Studios: Reel Time, Glasgow; Nightshift, Christchurch
- Genres: Dunedin sound, indie pop, alternative rock, jangle pop
- Length: 51:56 (CD)
- Label: Flying Nun
- Producer: The Bats

The Bats chronology
Made Up in Blue (1986)	Daddy's Highway (1987)	4 Songs (1988)

Singles from Daddy's Highway
- 1. "Block of Wood" Released: 1987

Daddy's Highway is the 1987 debut album by New Zealand indie rock group the Bats.

== Recording and release ==
By 1986, the Bats had released three critically acclaimed EPs, but still had not released a full-length album. While touring in the U.K. that year, an acquaintance in Glasgow offered the use of his home 8 track studio. Half of the tracks for what would become Daddy's Highway were recorded there.

Upon their return to New Zealand, recording was completed at Nightshift in Christchurch, and the album was released by Flying Nun in 1987. "Block of Wood" was released as a 7-inch vinyl single.

== Reception ==
Professional ratings
Review scores
Source	Rating
AllMusic	5/5 stars
Billboard	Recommended
Chicago Tribune	4/4 stars
Christgau's Record Guide	B+
Melody Maker	(favorable)
Spin	(favorable)

Daddy's Highway is the Bats' most highly regarded album, and has been named one of the best New Zealand albums of the 1980s. Billboard Los Angeles bureau chief Dave DiMartino named it one of the 10 best albums of 1989 in a year-end issue of that magazine, while Everett True called it a "minor masterpiece". In 2000, it placed No. 88 in Rip It Up magazine's list of New Zealand's Top 100 Albums of All Time. Notable tracks on the album include "North by North", "Tragedy" and the lead single, "Block of Wood", all of which were staples on New Zealand student radio.

== Reissues ==
The compact disc release swapped the order of sides one and two of the LP and added five bonus tracks: "Calm Before the Storm" and "Candidate", which were the B-sides to the "Block of Wood" single; and "Mad on You", "Trouble in This Town" and "Made Up in Blue", which constituted the band's Made Up in Blue EP.

In October 2010, Flying Nun reissued Daddy's Highway. The album was remastered by Paul Kean, and the same five bonus tracks were added.

== Track listing ==
All songs written by Robert Scott.

=== Original LP ===
Side one

1. "Block of Wood" – 3:12
2. "Miss These Things" – 3:07
3. "Mid City Team" – 2:25
4. "Some Peace Tonight" – 2:53
5. "Had to Be You" – 3:03
6. "Daddy's Highway" – 4:00

Side two

1. "Treason" – 2:55
2. "Sir Queen" – 3:25
3. "Round and Down" – 2:18
4. "Take It" – 2:30
5. "North by North" – 4:08
6. "Tragedy" – 3:00
- CD releases swap sides one and two and add five bonus tracks
13. "Calm Before the Storm" – 2:55
14. "Candidate" – 3:25
15. "Mad on You" – 2:18
16. "Trouble in This Town" – 2:30
17. "Made Up in Blue" – 4:08

== Personnel ==
The Bats

- Robert Scott – lead vocals, guitars
- Kaye Woodward – vocals, guitars; organ ("Tragedy"); bass guitar ("Block of Wood", "Had to Be You")
- Paul Kean – vocals, bass guitar; organ ("Daddy's Highway"); guitars ("Block of Wood", "Had to Be You")
- Malcolm Grant – drums; drum machine ("Mid City Team")

Additional musician

- Alastair Galbraith – violin ("Treason", "Sir Queen", "North by North")

Technical

- Paul Kean – engineer, mixing
- Callum MacLean – assistant engineer (side one, tracks 2–5)
- Rob Pinder – engineer (side one, tracks 1, 6; side two, tracks 7–12)
- Arnold Von Bussell – engineer (side one, tracks 1, 6; side two, tracks 7–12)
- Malcolm Grant – sleeve, Polaroids
