= Getaway (The Clean album) =

Studio album by the Clean
- Released: 20 August 2001
- Length: 51:23
- Label: Merge, Matador

The Clean chronology
Unknown Country (1996)	Getaway (2001)	Anthology (2002)

Professional ratings
Review scores
Source	Rating
AllMusic	4/5 stars
Ox-Fanzine	(favourable)
Pitchfork	7.6/10
PopMatters	(favourable)

Getaway is the fourth studio album by New Zealand group the Clean, released in 2001. The songs "Alpine Madness" and "Circle Canyon" feature contributions from Yo La Tengo members Georgia Hubley and Ira Kaplan.

== Track listing ==
No.	Title	Length
1.	"Stars"	5:22
2.	"Jala"	5:18
3.	"Crazy"	2:43
4.	"Golden Crown"	1:39
5.	"Cell Block No. 5"	1:26
6.	"E Motel"	2:34
7.	"Twilight Agency"	2:51
8.	"Poor Boy"	2:42
9.	"Silence or Something Else"	2:47
10.	"Alpine Madness"	1:39
11.	"Circle Canyon"	4:45
12.	"AHO"	6:14
13.	"Holdin' On"	2:42
14.	"Reprise 1, 2, 3, & 4"	6:41
15.	"Complications"	1:59
