= Mother Courage =

Mother Courage may refer to:

- Mother Courage (character), a character who appears in 16th-century works by Hans Jakob Christoffel von Grimmelshausen as well as the 1939 play by Brecht
- Mother Courage (play), the 1939 play by Bertolt Brecht originally titled Mutter Courage und ihre Kinder (Mother Courage and Her Children), often abbreviated
- Mother Courage (restaurant), a 1970s feminist restaurant in New York, named after the character

== See also ==
- Mother Courage and Her Children (album), a 2010 album by Duke Special featuring songs from a 2009 performance of the play
- Mutter Courage und ihre Kinder (film), a 1961 East German film based on the play
