= The Gordons (album) =

Studio album by The Gordons
- Released: 1981
- Recorded: 1981, October
- Genre: Post-Punk
- Label: Gordons – GORDON 2
- Producer: The Gordons, Simon Alexander

The Gordons chronology
Future Shock (1980)	The Gordons (1981)	Volume 2 (1984)

The Gordons is an album by New Zealand band The Gordons released in 1981. It received the inaugural Independent Music New Zealand Classic Record Award at the 2013 Taite Music Prize.

== Track listing ==
Side A

1. Spik And Span
2. Right On Time
3. Coalminers Song

Side B

1. Sometimes
2. I Just Can't Stop
3. Growing Up
4. Laughing Now

== Personnel ==
- Brent McLaughlin (drums)
- Alister Parker (guitar, vocals)
- John Halvorsen (guitar, vocals)
