= Here Come the Cars =

Studio album by David Kilgour
- Released: 1991
- Genre: Indie rock, alternative rock
- Length: 48:03
- Label: Flying Nun Records - FNCD220

David Kilgour chronology
Here Come the Cars (1991)	Sugar Mouth (1994)

Professional ratings
Review scores
Source	Rating
AllMusic	4/5 stars

Here Come the Cars is the debut solo album by New Zealand musician David Kilgour, released in 1991. It was reissued by Flying Nun Records in 2004 and in 2012.

The album peaked at #35 on the New Zealand album chart.

== Production ==
Kilgour recorded the album at Writhe Studios with members of the Strangeloves as his backing band.

== Critical reception ==
AllMusic wrote that "Kilgour's solo debut is a beauty, managing the neat trick -- like so many of Flying Nun's acts at their best -- of combining ready listenability with a dark but sweet edge." Trouser Press called the album "gorgeous" and "catchy, multi-textured and thoughtful all the way through."

== Track listing ==
All tracks are written by David Kilgour

Side one
No.	Title	Length
1.	"Here Come the Cars"	4:55
2.	"Fine"	3:23
3.	"You Forget"	4:10
4.	"Shivering"	4:41
5.	"Spasm"	2:36
6.	"Splash Your Jewels"	3:11

Side two
No.	Title	Length
1.	"Sometimes"	4:52
2.	"Kills All My Fun"	2:38
3.	"Spins You Round"	3:46
4.	"Blueprint"	2:53
5.	"Uplift"	5:52
6.	"Because It Was You"	1:56
7.	"Nothing Vol. 1"	3:10
Total length:		48:03

== Personnel ==
- David Kilgour (vocals, guitar, organ, piano, percussion)
- Tane Tokona (drums)
- Noel Ward (bass)

== Charts ==
Chart (1991)	Peak position
New Zealand Albums (RMNZ)	35
