= The Bats (New Zealand band) =

New Zealand rock band

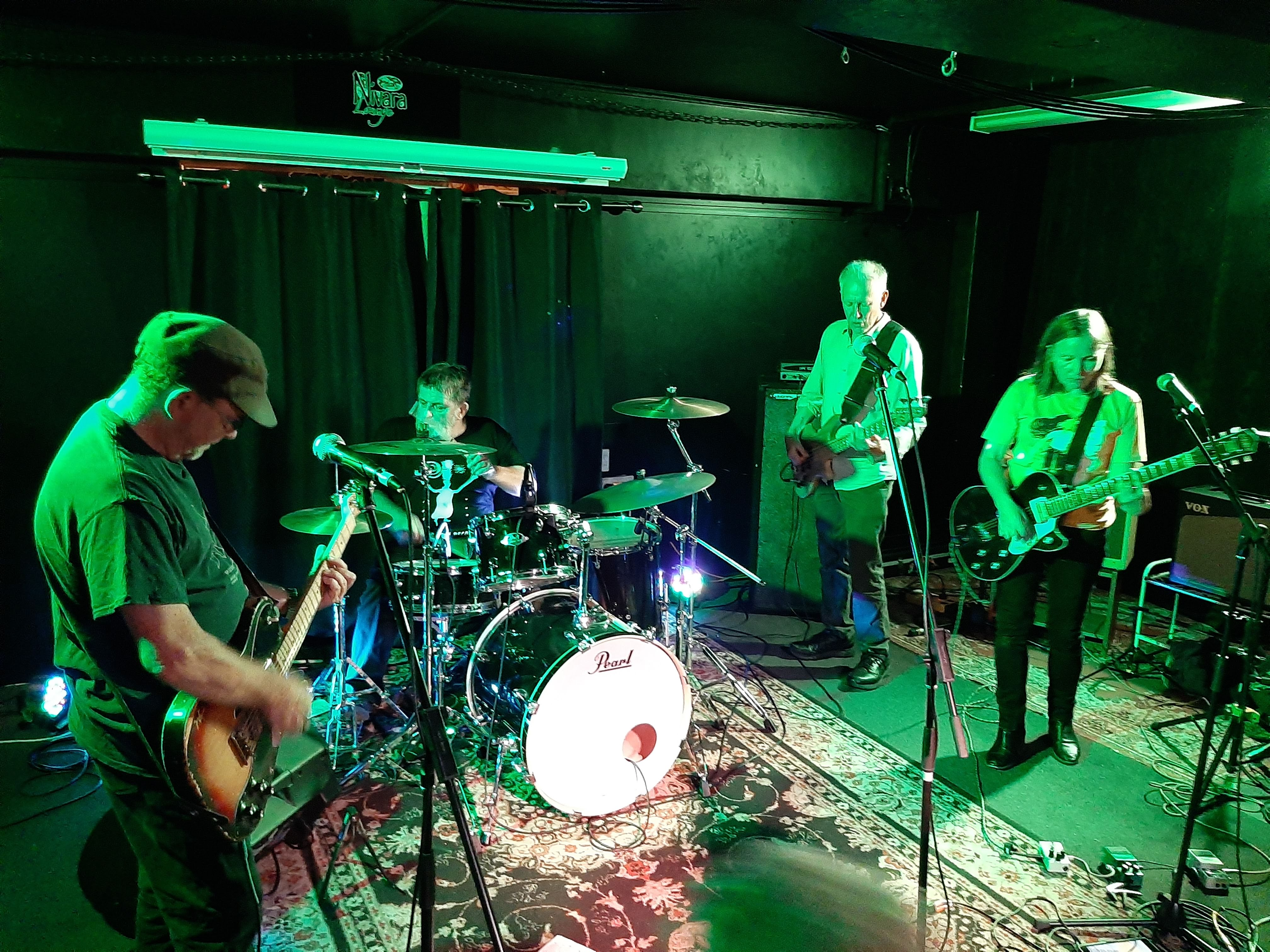
- The Bats performing at Nivara Lounge, Hamilton in March 2020

Background information
- Origin: Christchurch, New Zealand
- Genres: Dunedin sound, indie pop
- Years active: 1982–1995, 2005–present
- Labels: Flying Nun, Little Teddy Recordings
- Members: Paul Kean; Malcolm Grant; Robert Scott; Kaye Woodward

The Bats are an influential New Zealand rock band formed in 1982 in Christchurch by Paul Kean (bass), Malcolm Grant (drums), Robert Scott (lead vocals, rhythm guitar, keyboards) and Kaye Woodward (lead guitar, vocals). Though primarily a Christchurch band, The Bats have strong links to Dunedin and are usually grouped in with the Dunedin sound musicians that emerged in the early 1980s. The band has retained the same four members from 1982 to the present day.

== History ==
=== 1981–1986: origins and early years ===
In the early 1980s, Robert Scott and Kaye Woodward were sharing accommodation together in Christchurch. Scott was already playing bass in The Clean, and had also played with bassist Paul Kean in the short-lived band, Thanks To Llamas. After Scott taught Woodward some of his songs, the three began playing together at parties as The Percy Taiwan Band. After recruiting Malcolm Grant of The Bilders on drums, they renamed themselves The Bats.

The Bats first performed in Dunedin on New Year's Eve, 1982. Over the next two years, they were involved in the live music scene in Christchurch and Dunedin, before releasing their first EP, By Night (1984), on the nascent alternative New Zealand record label, Flying Nun. The band spent the next two years touring New Zealand and Australia, and released another EP, And Here Is 'Music for the Fireside' (1985). The band's early releases were accompanied by some typically low budget but original music videos, notably 'By Night', 'I Go Wild' and 'Downfall'.

The band then travelled to Europe and spent time touring Britain and Germany, including playing support for Alex Chilton. They recorded the Made Up in Blue EP at the 24 track Point Studio in London in December 1985. 'Made Up in Blue', the first single released in the U.K. by Flying Nun, was awarded 'Single of the Week' by the influential British magazine, NME. An acquaintance in Glasgow offered the use of his home 8 track studio, and half of the tracks for what would become their debut album, Daddy's Highway, were recorded there.

=== 1987–1994: peak Flying Nun years ===
The Bats returned to New Zealand to finish recording for Daddy's Highway, which was released in 1987. The album has been named as their most highly regarded and one of the best New Zealand albums of the 1980s. In 2000, it was named No. 88 in music magazine Rip It Up's New Zealand's Top 100 Albums of All Time. Notable tracks on the album include "North By North", "Tragedy" and the lead single, "Block of Wood", all of which were staples on New Zealand student radio.

The Bats' second album The Law of Things (1990) continued to define a consistent Bats sound. It featured Alastair Galbraith on violin, as did Daddy's Highway. In 1991, The Bats released Fear of God. It spent three months on the French top 50 album charts. Also in 1990, Flying Nun re-released the band's first three EPs on a single compilation CD, Compiletely Bats.

The band found increasing success in the United States over this period. Between 1986 and 1993, The Bats toured the US four times, including 14 dates supporting Radiohead in 1993. Their fourth album, Silverbeet, reached No. 6 on the College Music Journal album chart.

The Bats' next album, Couchmaster (1995), would prove to be their last for ten years.

=== 1995 – present: hiatus and return ===
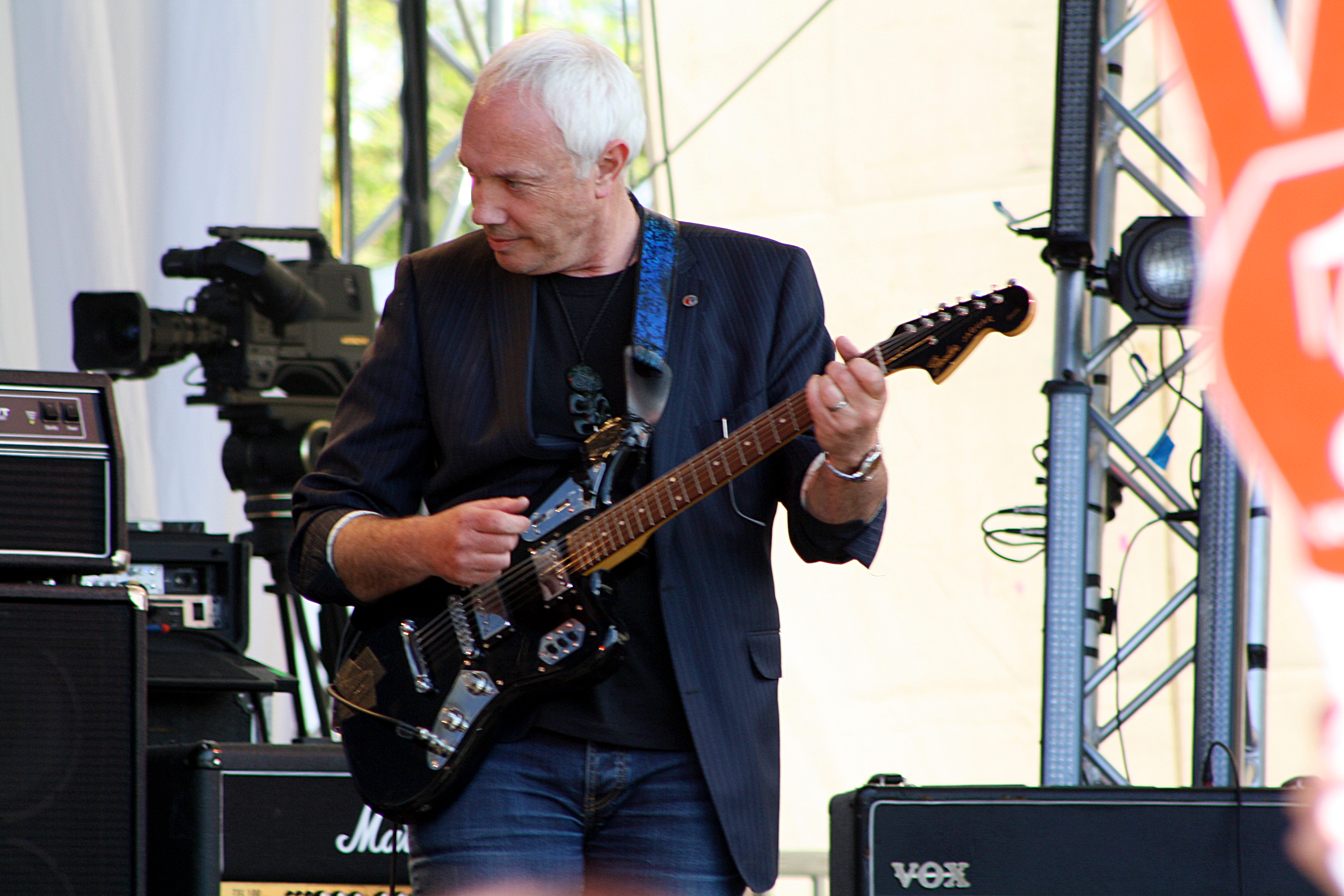
Mayor Bob Parker performing with The Bats at the Band Together Concert For Canterbury in October 2010

From 1995, The Bats took a break, with band members concentrating on raising families and on other musical projects. Scott joined his former band The Clean on a reunion tour, and released a solo album, The Creeping Unknown, in 2001, while Woodward, Kean and Grant formed another band, Minisnap. In 2000 the compilation album Thousands Of Tiny Luminous Spheres was released on Flying Nun Records. The Bats continued to play occasional gigs, often opening as Minisnap and finishing with the full Bats lineup.

Robert Scott has stated that he thinks the regular breaks taken by the band have contributed to its longevity. In an interview, he said, "Each time we come back to it, it is fun. I don’t think working on other projects has harmed or hindered any other projects. It adds to it I think."

In September 2005, The Bats released their first album in ten years, At the National Grid, on their own label, Pocket Music. Internationally, the album was released by Little Teddy Records in Germany, Magic Marker in the US and Egg Records in the UK. The album generally received very positive reviews. Tim Sendra at Allmusic gave it 4 stars, adding "...having the group back at such a high level is as refreshing as a plunge into an ice-cold mountain stream." It got airplay on many college radio stations in the US, leading to an appearance at Austin's SXSW Festival in 2006.

The Bats' seventh full-length album, The Guilty Office, was recorded in Heathcote Valley, Christchurch, and was released on 1 December 2008 through Arch Hill., with the first single, 'Castle Lights'. International release followed, on YesBoyIcecream in the UK and Europe, Kning Disk in Scandinavia, Hidden Agenda in the US, and Mistletone in Australia.The Guilty Office was named in the top 5 of 2008 by New Zealand television host, John Campbell, and received many positive reviews including 4 stars from Allmusic and Mojo Magazine. The band toured the UK and Europe in May and June 2009 in support of the album. In October 2010, the band played at the free relief concert in Hagley Park following the September 2010 Canterbury earthquake in front of about 140,000 people. The Mayor of Christchurch at the time, Bob Parker, joined The Bats for the performance and played guitar.

In 2011, The Bats reunited with their old label Flying Nun and released their eighth album, Free All the Monsters, which was described by Pitchfork as "...their best record in years, possibly ever". The album was released by Mistletone Records in Australia, Revolver/Midheaven Distribution in the US, and Forte Distribution in the UK and Europe. It was also shortlisted for the 2012 Taite Music Prize.

== Popular culture ==
- "North By North", from Daddy's Highway, was used as the title theme for the Australian ABC TV series The Hollowmen. It was also featured in the New Zealand film Topless Women Talk About Their Lives.
- "Afternoon in Bed", from Couchmaster, was used in the 2010 film Last Night.

== Discography ==
=== Albums ===
Year	Title	Record label (NZ)	Catalog number	New Zealand Albums Chart peak
1987	Daddy's Highway	Flying Nun Records	FN079	-
1990	The Law of Things	Flying Nun Records	FN121	No. 38
1991	Fear of God	Flying Nun Records, Festival Records	FNCD 217, D 30567	No. 43
1993	Silverbeet	Flying Nun Records	FNCD260	No. 26
1995	Couchmaster	Flying Nun Records	FNCD301	-
2005	At the National Grid	Pocket Music Ltd, Rhythm Method		-
2008	The Guilty Office	Arch Hill Recordings	AHR036	-
2011	Free All the Monsters	Flying Nun Records	FNCD513	No. 34
2017	The Deep Set	Flying Nun Records	FNLP568	-
2020	Foothills	Flying Nun Records	FN593	No. 13
2025	Corner Coming Up	Flying Nun Records		No. 17

=== EPs ===
Year	Title	Record label (NZ)	Catalog number	New Zealand Singles Chart peak
1984	By Night	Flying Nun Records	FN024	No. 34
1985	And Here Is 'Music for the Fireside'	Flying Nun Records	FN031	No. 36
1986	Made Up in Blue	Flying Nun Records	FN060	No. 41
1988	4 Songs	Flying Nun Records	FN104	-
1993	Courage	Flying Nun Records	FNCD261	No. 36
1994	Spill the Beans	Flying Nun Records, Festival Records	FNCD291, D11771	-
1995	Afternoon in Bed	Flying Nun Records, Festival Records	FNCD341, D01197	-
2009	Don't You Rise	Slumberland Records	SLR 90	-

=== Singles ===
Year	Title	Record label (NZ)	Catalog number	B side
1987	Block Of Wood	Flying Nun Records	FN084	B1 Calm Before The Storm (2:39) - B2 Candidate (3:26)
1990	Smoking Her Wings	Flying Nun Records	FN124	B1 Mastery (2:58) - B2 Passed By (3:06)
1991	The Black And The Blue	Flying Nun Records	FN168	Watch The Walls (4:30)
1991	Boogey Man	Flying Nun Records	D11036	B1 Jetsam (4:42) - B2 Mama Come Watch (3:36)
2009	S/T split w/ Songs	The Spring Press	SP06	A1 Castle Lights (3:08) - A2 Under the Branches (3:08)

=== Compilations ===
- Compiletely Bats (Flying Nun Records, 1990)
- Thousands Of Tiny Luminous Spheres (Flying Nun Records, 2000)

=== Box set ===
- Volume 1 (Flying Nun Records, 2014)
