= Odditties (The Clean album) =

Compilation album by The Clean
- Released: 1983
- Genre: Indie rock, lo-fi
- Label: Cleano Productions

The Clean chronology
Great Sounds Great, Good Sounds Good, So-so Sounds So-so, Bad Sounds Bad, Rotten Sounds Rotten (1982)	Odditties (1983)	Compilation (1986)

Professional ratings
Review scores
Source	Rating
AllMusic	3/5 stars

Odditties (with two ts) is a compilation album by New Zealand group The Clean. It was initially self-released on cassette in 1983 by Cleano Productions, and re-released by Flying Nun Records, first as a double LP in 1985 and then on CD in 1994.

== Track listing ==
=== 1983 self-released cassette ===
Side A

1. Odditty
2. Success Story
3. Thumbs Off
4. Yellowman
5. Getting Older
6. End of My Dream
7. Platypus
8. This Guy
9. David Bowie
10. Mudchucker Blues

Side B

1. At The Bottom
2. Hold Onto The Rail
3. Fats Domino
4. Sad Eyed Lady
5. Tell Me Why
6. In The Back
7. Band That Never Was
8. Wheels of Industry
9. Point That Thing Dub
10. Safety at Home

=== 1994 Flying Nun Records CD (fncd 223 / D19901) ===
1. Odditty - 02:38
2. Success Story - 03:15
3. Thumbs Off - 02:55
4. Getting Older - 04:34
5. Yellow Man - 04:01
6. End of My Dream - 04:14
7. Platypus - 03:49
8. This Guy - 00:52
9. David Bowie - 01:51
10. Mudchucker Blues - 00:54
11. At The Bottom - 04:43
12. Hold Onto The Rail - 02:19
13. Inside Out - 03:33
14. Fats Domino - 02:04
15. Sad Eyed Lady - 03:03
16. Tell Me Why - 01:41
17. In The Back - 01:59
18. Band That Never Was - 02:22
19. Wheels of Industry - 01:18
20. Point That Thing Dub - 03:52
21. Safety at Home - 01:50
22. Lemmings - 02:27
23. Stylaphone Music - 00:45
