= National Day of Encouragement =

Annual observance in the US

- Date: September 12
- Next time: September 12, 2025
- Frequency: annual

The National Day of Encouragement in the United States was announced in 2007 and occurs each year on September 12. It is a day to uplift and encourage people to make a positive impact in their lives.

The first proclamation for the Day of Encouragement was made by Mayor Belinda LaForce of Searcy, Arkansas on August 22, 2007. In September Mike Beebe, the Governor of Arkansas, signed a proclamation making September 12, 2007 the "State Day of Encouragement" for Arkansas.

Later, President George W. Bush also signed a message making September 12 the official "National Day of Encouragement."

The Encouragement Foundation is making plans to get more states involved in the National Day of Encouragement in the future.
