= Arch Hill Recordings =

New Zealand recording studio and record label

Arch Hill Recordings, formerly Arch Hill Studios, is a New Zealand recording studio and record label in Auckland. It was founded in 1998.

Artists include David Kilgour, The Clean, The Bats, Don McGlashan, Bachelorette, The Boxcar Guitars, Luke Buda, Dappled Cities, Fang, Ghostplane, Grand Prix, The Haints of Dean Hall, Jay Clarkson, Surf City, Lanky, Mestar, David Mulcahy (formerly of the Jean-Paul Sartre Experience), Pine, White Swan Black Swan and Punches.

Arch Hill Recordings, the label, was born out of a studio called Arch Hill Studios, based on Auckland New Zealand's Great North Rd. In late 1998 a bunch of musicians who had all had previous connections with one another were all recording at the studio. Those ensconced in projects at Arch Hill Studios included Dave Mulcahy (previously in Flying Nun bands the Jean Paul Sartre Experience and Superette), Ben Howe and Greta Anderson (also previously in Superette) and Jim Laing (previously in the Jean Paul Sartre Experience). This resulted in the first Arch Hill release by David Mulcahy in 1999, followed the next year by Lanky and Fang.

The first band to join the label from outside this circle of friends was Christchurch band Pine, followed by Wellington's Ghostplane...from there things really got going and in the last five years we have released albums by icons such as David Kilgour, Don McGlashan, The Clean and Luke Buda as well as up and coming artists like Surf City, The Haints of Dean Hall, Grand Prix, Punches, Bachelorette and White Swan Black Swan. Many of these artists have had releases and touring in foreign territories, particularly in the US and Australia. Arch Hill has also taken on offshore artists such as Dappled Cities Fly, Batrider, Beach House and Panda Bear.

These days the studio is mostly just used for bands on the label and a few mastering/editing jobs for a handful of clients, and is not hired out to bands.

In 2006 Arch Hill also started working with international bands through the touring company Mystery Girl Presents, bringing out artists such as Sonic Youth, Calexico, Fleet Foxes, Stereolab, Spiritualized, Jolie Holland, Joanna Newsom, Iron & Wine, Catpower, Kelley Stoltz, Andrew Bird, Interpol, Jose Gonzalez, Tilly and the Wall, Ween, The Handsome Family, Trans Am, The Lemonheads, M.Ward and more.

Ben Howe is the Arch Hill and Mystery Girl label manager.

Rosie Riggir is runs of promotions. She is also lead singer in techno-punk-pop-rock band Charlie Ash.

Ed Case is in charge of recording and engineering.

Stephen McCarthy & Aaron Beehre from Pine do most of the artwork.

== Compilations ==
These feature Arch Hill artists:

- Introducing Arch Hill (2001)
- The Hill Is Alive - Compilation 2 (2003)

== See also ==
- List of record labels
