= The Clean =

New Zealand indie rock band

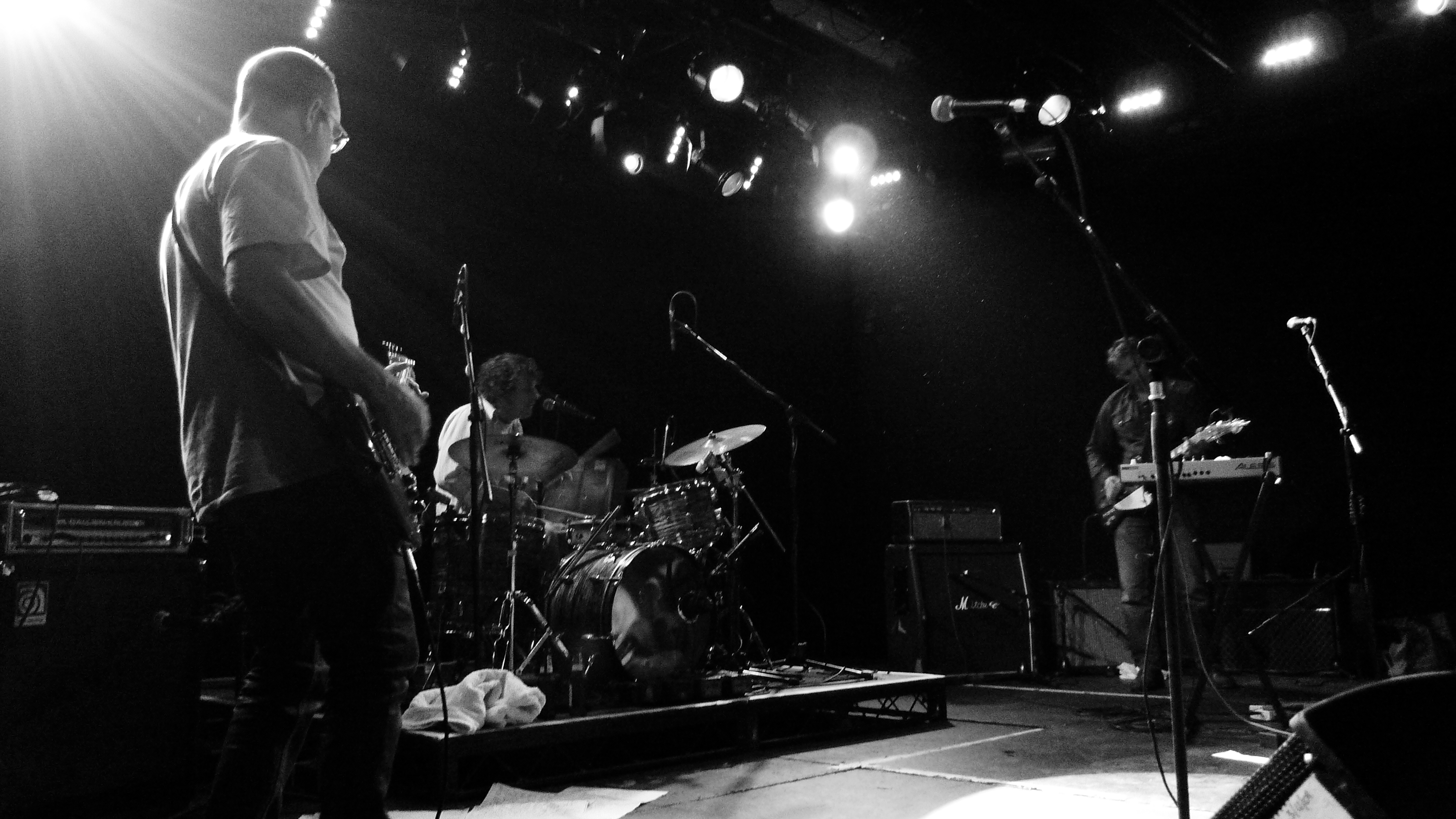
- The Clean performing in 2010

Background information
- Origin: Dunedin, New Zealand
- Genres: Indie rock; Dunedin sound; post-punk; power pop; jangle pop; garage rock
- Years active: 1978–2022
- Labels: Flying Nun; Merge; Arch Hill
- Spinoffs: The Great Unwashed
- Past members: David Kilgour; Hamish Kilgour; Peter Gutteridge; Doug Hood; Robert Scott

The Clean was a New Zealand indie rock band formed in Dunedin in 1978. They have been described as the most influential band to come from the Flying Nun label, which recorded many artists associated with the "Dunedin sound", and one of the first bands to be described as "indie rock".

Led by brothers Hamish and David Kilgour, the band rotated through a number of musicians before settling on their well-known and longest running line-up with Robert Scott. Their name comes from a character from the movie Free Ride called Mr. Clean.

== History ==
=== Formation ===
Hamish and David Kilgour started to write and play music together in Dunedin in 1978, influenced by 1960s pop rock and garage records, punk rock, and psychedelic music. Both brothers were part of a small but growing alternative music scene at the time in Dunedin, which followed the growing American and British punk movements closely through imported magazines and vinyl records. Hamish was friends with Chris Knox through this scene, then-frontperson of early influential New Zealand punk band The Enemy.

The Clean began playing live shows in Dunedin in mid-1978 alongside The Enemy, initially featuring Hamish on guitar, David on drums, Doug Hood on vocals, and Peter Gutteridge on bass. In 1979 the band temporarily relocated to Auckland without Gutteridge, leaving the band with no permanent bass player. Hamish moved to vocals, and was replaced on drums by Lyndsay Hooke. In 1980 the Kilgours moved back to Dunedin, and Robert Scott joined the band on bass, with Hamish moving to the drums and David to guitar and vocals.

=== Early releases ===
In September 1981, The Clean's debut single "Tally Ho! / Platypus", was the tied-first release on Roger Shepherd's Flying Nun Records label, alongside The Pin Group's "Ambivalence". "Tally Ho!" reached number 19 on the New Zealand Singles Chart, giving the nascent label its first hit.

Following the release of "Tally Ho!", The Clean recorded their debut 12" EP Boodle Boodle Boodle in September 1981, engineered by Chris Knox and Doug Hood in an old Auckland hall. The EP was released on Flying Nun in October, debuting at number five on the New Zealand music chart and staying in the top 20 for almost six months. The continued success of the EP gave Flying Nun more financial security, and allowed the label to grow further. In May 1982, the band recorded and released the Great Sounds Great, Good Sounds Good, So-so Sounds So-so, Bad Sounds Bad, Rotten Sounds Rotten EP, produced again by Knox and Hood. The release reached number four on the music charts and received positive praise. They supported The Fall on their 1982 tour of New Zealand, before releasing the "Getting Older" 7" single in October 1982.

=== Hiatus ===
Following "Getting Older" and for most of the 1980s, The Clean were effectively disbanded. Flying Nun released Odditties in July 1983, a cassette of 21 previously unreleased songs, many from the band's own home recordings made on a Revox B77 tape recorder. In September the brothers released an album as The Great Unwashed named Clean Out of Our Minds, which David said was "an extension of Odditites, the bedroom mentality.” The band would later include former Clean bassist Peter Gutteridge, and Pin Group member Ross Humphries. They released Singles in May 1984, a collection of two 7" records, before David left the band indefinitely in November 1984.

Robert Scott joined Thanks To Llamas, which later became fellow Dunedin sound and Flying Nun band The Bats. After leaving the Great Unwashed, Hamish co-founded Bailter Space in 1987. Even with The Clean in abeyance, Flying Nun released live EP Live Dead Clean in 1986, a collection of their EPs, singles, and some live recordings called Compilation in the same year, and a second Odditties tape in 1988.

=== Reunion ===
The band reunited in 1988, opening for The Bats twice in London. Some recordings from these shows were later released in the "In-A-Live" 12" in 1989. The Clean played a tour of major New Zealand centres in May 1989, selling out Auckland's Powerstation. They released the album Vehicle in 1990, and toured the United States, Britain and Europe multiple times to promote the record.

During the 1990s, The Clean continued to tour internationally, releasing studio albums Modern Rock in 1994 and Unknown Country in 1996. In 1995, Flying Nun released Abba tribute compilation Abbasalutely, featuring a David Kilgour and Robert Scott cover of "Waterloo" as Cloth, which the liner notes describe as "The Clean minus Hamish".

In 2003, the two-disc compilation Anthology, released on Merge Records, awakened new interest in the band in the US, building on an international reputation that had been enhanced by endorsements from prominent 1990s indie groups such as Pavement and Yo La Tengo. The band released further records and live albums on both American and New Zealand labels, their most recent album being Mister Pop in 2009. They toured the US in 2012 and 2014.

Hamish Kilgour's death was announced on 6 December 2022, days after his family reporting him missing. Doug Hood died from cancer in September 2024.

== Discography ==
- Vehicle (1990)
- Modern Rock (1994)
- Unknown Country (1996)
- Getaway (2001)
- Mister Pop (2009)

== Awards ==
=== Aotearoa Music Awards ===
The Aotearoa Music Awards (previously known as New Zealand Music Awards (NZMA)) are an annual awards night celebrating excellence in New Zealand music and have been presented annually since 1965.

Year	Nominee / work	Award	Result	Ref.
2017	The Clean	New Zealand Music Hall of Fame	inductee	

== Filmography ==
- 1999: Scarfies, in which they are seen performing the song "Tally Ho!" in a performance at the Empire Tavern, Dunedin (the line-up for this performance was David Kilgour, Robert Scott, Robbie Yeats, and Thomas Bell). The song appeared on the soundtrack.

== See also ==
- Music of New Zealand
- The Chills
- Tall Dwarfs
