= Silverbeet (album) =

Studio album by the Bats
- Released: 1 June 1993
- Recorded: 15 November – 2 December 1992
- Studios: The Outpost, Stoughton, Massachusetts
- Genres: Dunedin sound; indie pop; alternative rock
- Length: 51:17
- Label: Flying Nun
- Producers: Lou Giordano; the Bats

The Bats chronology
Fear of God (1991)	Silverbeet (1993)	Spill the Beans (1994)

Silverbeet is the fourth album by the New Zealand band the Bats, released in 1993.

The album was recorded from 15 November to 2 December 1992, at The Outpost in Stoughton, Massachusetts.

"Courage" was released as a CD single that included two additional non-album tracks and a reworked version of "Slow Alight". Silverbeet peaked at No. 26 on the New Zealand album charts.

== Recording ==
Scott said, "For the first time we got a happy balance between good production and getting the songs down without too much interference with trying fancy overdubs and stuff. Silverbeet sounds very much like the Bats, and if you heard us live it would be pretty accurate."

== Critical reception ==
Professional ratings
Review scores
Source	Rating
AllMusic	3/5 stars

The Washington Post wrote that "the album's melodies overshadow the lyrics, conveying an impression that's blithe and hopeful." The Hamilton Spectator noted that "there are flashes of alternative favorites Inspiral Carpets and glimpses of Happy Mondays, but the Bats hold their own in terms of strong songwriting, even though their lyrics seem internal and uncertain." CMJ New Music Monthly called the album "a smoothly beautiful compilation of Scott's pop dramatics and vibrant hooks that added a slightly unfinished, rangy feel to the Bats' polished tunes."

== Track listing ==
All lyrics are written by Robert Scott; all music is composed by the Bats/Robert Scott.

No.	Title	Length
1.	"Courage"	4:05
2.	"Sighting the Sound"	3:41
3.	"Too Much"	3:02
4.	"Slow Alight"	3:41
5.	"Valley Floor"	3:31
6.	"Love Floats Two"	5:00
7.	"Green"	3:55
8.	"No Time for Your Kind"	3:29
9.	"Straight On Home"	4:14
10.	"Before the Day"	3:38
11.	"Stay Away"	3:56
12.	"Drive Me Some Boars"	3:41
13.	"Half Way to Nowhere"	5:17

Paul Kean has stated that the song "Slow Alight" on the album is actually named "Alight from the Rear".

== Personnel ==
- Malcolm Grant – drums, cover art
- Paul Kean – bass, vocals, piano (track 6), guitar (track 11)
- Robert Scott – guitar, lead vocals, keyboards (tracks 1, 6 & 13)
- Kaye Woodward – guitar, vocals, keyboards (track 5)

Also credited:

- Lou Giordano – engineer, producer
