= Great Sounds Great, Good Sounds Good, So-so Sounds So-so, Bad Sounds Bad, Rotten Sounds Rotten =

- Front cover artwork of the EP.

EP by The Clean
- Released: 1982
- Recorded: 21–23 March 1982; Christchurch, New Zealand
- Genre: Indie rock, lo-fi, garage pop
- Length: 19:22
- Label: Flying Nun
- Producer: Chris Knox, Doug Hood

The Clean chronology
Boodle Boodle Boodle (1982)	Great Sounds Great, Good Sounds Good, So-so Sounds So-so, Bad Sounds Bad, Rotten Sounds Rotten (1982)	Odditties (1983)

Great Sounds Great, Good Sounds Good, So-so Sounds So-so, Bad Sounds Bad, Rotten Sounds Rotten (usually simply known as Great Sounds Great) is the second EP by The Clean, a lo-fi rock band from Dunedin, New Zealand. It was released by Flying Nun Records on 12" vinyl in 1982.

The EP is included in its entirety, and in the same running order, as part of The Clean's 2002 CD release Anthology.

== Track listing ==
Side one
No.	Title	Length
1.	"Fish"	2:28
2.	"Flowers"	3:29
3.	"Side On"	2:03
4.	"Slug Song"	3:22

Side two
No.	Title	Length
1.	"Beatnik"	2:00
2.	"End of My Dream"	4:13
3.	"On Again/Off Again"	1:47

== Charts ==
Chart (1982)	Peak position
New Zealand (Recorded Music NZ)	4
