= David Kilgour (musician) =

New Zealand musician

David Kilgour MNZM
- Born: David Auld Kilgour; 1961 or 1962 (age 64–65); Ranfurly, New Zealand
- Genre: Indie rock
- Occupations: Musician, songwriter
- Instruments: Guitar, vocals
- Labels: Flying Nun Records, Arch Hill Recordings, Merge Records

David Auld Kilgour MNZM (born 1961 or 1962) is a New Zealand songwriter, musician and recording artist from Dunedin. He first started playing guitar as a teenager in the late 1970s. With brother Hamish he formed The Clean, a group that went on to become one of the principal acts of the Dunedin Sound.

== Early life and family ==
Born in Ranfurly, Kilgour is the son of McGregor Kilgour and Helen Stewart Kilgour (née Auld). He was educated at Otago Boys' High School from 1974 to 1976.

== Career ==
=== 1980s: The Clean and The Great Unwashed ===
In 1980, Kilgour was one of the founders of New Zealand independent rock band, The Clean. The Clean broke up in the mid- 1980s and David Kilgour proceeded to form and play with other bands such as Stephen and The Great Unwashed. The Clean reformed in 1989 and produced the album Vehicle.

=== 1990s-present: Solo career ===
In 1991, Kilgour released his debut solo album Here Come the Cars, which received much critical acclaim and peaked at number 35 on the New Zealand chart. In 1994 Kilgour released his second studio album, Sugar Mouth.

In 1995 Kilgour released First Steps and False Alarms, a compilation of recordings and demos, the so-called "best of the worst", between the late '80s and early '90s. In 1997 he released his third album, David Kilgour and the Heavy Eights.

At the 2001 New Year Honours, Kilgour was appointed a Member of the New Zealand Order of Merit, for services to music. That same year, he released his 4th studio album, A Feather in the Engine.

In 2004, Kilgour released his fifth solo album Frozen Orange. The making of Frozen Orange was documented by filmmaker Bridget Sutherland in the film Far Off Town: Dunedin to Nashville. The film screened at Raindance Film Festival, London; Nashville Film Festival, San Francisco Film Festival, Aarhus Festival of Independent Arts, Denmark and was nominated for ‘Best Feature Documentary’ at DOCNZ, 2007.

In February 2007 Kilgour released his sixth solo album, The Far Now.

== Discography ==
=== Studio albums ===
List of studio albums, with New Zealand chart positions
Title	Album details	Peak chart positions
Title	Album details	NZ
Here Come the Cars	Released: 1991; Label: Flying Nun Records (FN220); Format: LP, CD, Cassette	35
Sugar Mouth	Released: May 1994; Label: Flying Nun Records (FN282); Format: LP, CD	45
David Kilgour & The Heavy Eights (as David Kilgour & The Heavy Eights)	Released: 1997; Label: Flying Nun Records (FN397); Format: CD	-
A Feather in the Engine	Released: 2001; Label: Arclife Records (arclife 016); Format: CD	-
Frozen Orange	Released: 2004; Label: Arch Hill Recordings (AHR013); Format: CD	-
The Far Now	Released: February 2007; Label: Arch Hill Recordings (AHR025); Format: CD, DD	-
Falling Debris (with Sam Hunt)	Released: 2008; Label: Arch Hill Recordings (AHR039); Format: CD, DD	-
Left by Soft (as David Kilgour & The Heavy Eights)	Released: April 2011; Label: Arch Hill Recordings (AHR047); Format: CD, DD	31
End Times Undone (as David Kilgour & The Heavy Eights)	Released: 2014; Label: Merge Records (MRG519); Format: CD, DD, LP	-
Bobbie's a Girl (as David Kilgour & The Heavy Eights)	Released: September 2019; Label: Merge Records (MRG688); Format: CD, DD, LP, streaming	25

=== Demo albums ===
List of demo albums
Title	Album details
David	Released: 1989; Label: Alley Oop (ALLEY OOP 1); Format: Cassette
First Steps & False Alarms	Released: 1995; Label: Ajax; Format: CD

=== Extended plays ===
List of EPs
Title	Album details
Pop Art Toasters (with The Chills)	Released: 1994; Label: Flying Nun (FNCD288); Format: CD
Spiritual Gas Station	Released: 1994; Label: Flying Nun (FNCD308); Format: CD
Cracks in the Sidewalk	Released: 2002; Label: Arclife Records (arc 017); Format: CD

=== See also ===
- The Clean discography

== Awards and nominations ==
=== Aotearoa Music Awards ===
The Aotearoa Music Awards (previously known as New Zealand Music Awards (NZMA)) are an annual awards night celebrating excellence in New Zealand music and have been presented annually since 1965.

Year	Nominee / work	Award	Result	Ref.
1993	David Kilgour	Songwriter of the Year	Nominated	
1995	David Kilgour	Male Artist of the Year	Nominated	
2017	David Kilgour (as part of The Clean)	New Zealand Music Hall of Fame	inductee	
