= Peter Gutteridge =

- Born: 19 May 1961; Dunedin, New Zealand
- Died: 15 September 2014 (aged 53) Auckland, New Zealand
- Occupation: Singer-songwriter
- Instruments: Guitar, keyboards
- Years active: 1978–2014
- Label: Flying Nun Records
- Formerly of: The Clean, Snapper, The Chills

Peter Gutteridge (19 May 1961 – 15 September 2014) was a New Zealand musician, credited with pioneering the Dunedin sound with The Clean and The Chills.

== Life and career ==
Gutteridge was a founding member of The Clean in 1978, alongside Hamish and David Kilgour, whom Gutteridge had known from his schooldays. He was a founding member of The Chills in 1980, staying with the band for only a few months. He left because he found the environment "too controlling."

In 1982–83 he was a member of The Cartilage Family, alongside Shayne Carter, for their two performances. After leaving the band, he rejoined The Clean's Kilgour brothers to form The Great Unwashed in 1983, bringing four songs he had written for The Cartilage Family. The band later performed on the John Peel Show.

Gutteridge later formed the band Snapper, with whom he performed from 1986. Other bands in which Gutteridge has been involved have included the Alpaca Brothers and The Puddle.

Gutteridge released one solo album, Pure, on Xpressway Records in 1989.

Peter Gutteridge died on 15 September 2014, in Auckland, New Zealand.

== Legacy ==
SPIN Magazine noted, "the lilting looseness of bands like Yo La Tengo, Ducktails, Beach Fossils, and Twerps owes a fair debt to the sound that Gutteridge helped craft."

Yo La Tengo covered "Gentle Hour" and Wooden Shjips often covered "Buddy" in concert.

Gutteridge did not particularly like being associated with the Dunedin sound. He stated, "People didn't think about the sound of things, people put on guitars and then clanged out stuff. I just got tired of a guitar sound that wasn't thought about. I had my own personal style. I mean, I wrote [The Clean's] Point That Thing [Somewhere Else]' at 17."

Michael Hann, writing in The Guardian music blog, indicated that he derived some of his fame from his label: "Whatever Gutteridge's feelings about his peers, he did not exist in a vacuum: part of what drew people to his work was the knowledge of the other Flying Nun bands" but that he was different and influential in his own right.

== Discography ==
=== Albums ===
List of albums
Title	Album details
Pure	Released: 1989; Label: Xpressway (X/WAY 9); Format: CD, LP

== See also ==
- The Clean
- The Chills
- Snapper (band)

== Awards ==
=== Aotearoa Music Awards ===
The Aotearoa Music Awards (previously known as New Zealand Music Awards (NZMA)) are an annual awards night celebrating excellence in New Zealand music and have been presented annually since 1965.

Year	Nominee / work	Award	Result	Ref.
2017	Peter Gutteridge (as part of The Clean)	New Zealand Music Hall of Fame	inductee	

== Sources ==
- Davey, T. & Puschmann, H. (1996) Kiwi rock. Dunedin: Kiwi Rock Publications. ISBN 0-473-03718-1.
- Dix, J. (1988) Stranded in paradise: New Zealand rock'n'roll 1955–1988. Wellington: Paradise Publications. ISBN 0-473-00638-3.
- Eggleton, D. (2003) Ready to fly: The story of New Zealand rock music. Nelson, NZ: Craig Potton Publishing. ISBN 1-877333-06-9.
