= Hamish Kilgour =

New Zealand musician (1957–2022)

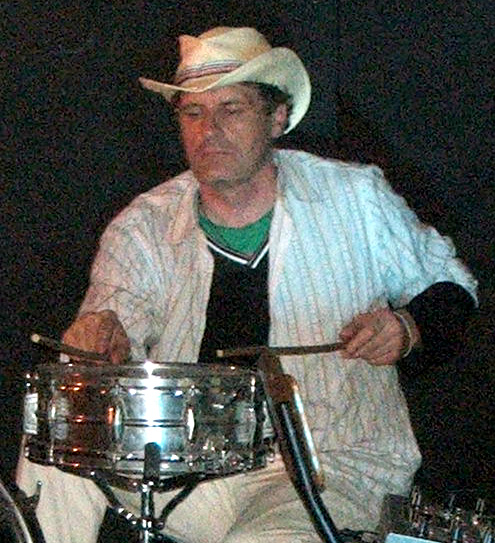
- Kilgour in 2011

Background information
- Born: 17 March 1957; Christchurch, New Zealand
- Died: c. 27 November 2022 (aged 65) Christchurch, New Zealand
- Genre: Indie rock
- Occupations: Musician, songwriter
- Instruments: Drums, vocals, guitar
- Labels: Flying Nun, Merge, Ba Da Bing

Hamish Kilgour (17 March 1957 – c. 27 November 2022) was a New Zealand musician who co-founded the indie rock band the Clean with his brother David in 1978. Kilgour also co-founded the band Bailter Space in 1987 as well as the band the Mad Scene in the 1990s. He later recorded as a solo artist.

== Career ==
Kilgour was born in Christchurch on 17 March 1957.

After the Clean temporarily split up in the early 80s, Kilgour co-founded the Christchurch space rock band Bailter Space in 1987, and recorded the Nelsh Bailter Space EP and Tanker album with the band. In the late 1980s, while on a promotional tour with Bailter Space in New York City, Kilgour decided to remain in the city and left the band. While in New York, Kilgour co-founded the band the Mad Scene in the early 1990s with guitarist and bassist Lisa Siegel. The Mad Scene released an EP, Falling Over, Spilling Over, in 1992 on NYC indie label Homestead Records. Hamish's former label, New Zealand's Flying Nun, released the band's debut album A Trip Thru Monsterland in 1993. After some personnel changes, the band signed to Merge Records and their second album Sealight was released in 1996.

Kilgour's debut solo album All of It and Nothing was released on Ba Da Bing Records on 16 September 2014.

The Clean, including Kilgour, were inducted into the New Zealand Music Hall of Fame in 2017.

== Death ==
Kilgour was last seen at The Palms shopping centre in Christchurch on 27 November 2022. He was reported missing by his family on 1 December. On 6 December 2022, the police confirmed that Kilgour's body had been found in the Christchurch suburb of Burwood. In 2025, the coroner was unable to determine Kilgour's exact date of death, but ruled that he died by suicide on or around 27 November 2022.

== See also ==
- List of solved missing person cases (2020s)

== Discography ==
=== Albums ===
List of albums
Title	Album details
All of It and Nothing	Released: 2014; Label: Ba Da Bing Records (BING 102); Format: CD, LP, DD
Finklestein	Released: 2018; Label: Ba Da Bing! (BING 128); Format: CD, LP, DD

== Awards ==
=== Aotearoa Music Awards ===
The Aotearoa Music Awards (previously known as New Zealand Music Awards (NZMA)) are an annual awards night celebrating excellence in New Zealand music and have been presented annually since 1965.

Year	Nominee / work	Award	Result	Ref.
1992	Hamish Kilgour for Pink Flying Saucers Over the Southern Alps (various artist)	Album Cover of the Year	Won	
2017	Hamish Kilgour (as part of The Clean)	New Zealand Music Hall of Fame	inductee	
