= Robert Scott (musician) =

New Zealand musician

Robert Scott, photographed in Dunedin, July 2011

Robert Scott is a New Zealand musician. He is a part of indie rock bands The Clean and The Bats, playing bass for The Clean, and guitar/vocals for The Bats, and writing songs for both. Other bands with which he has been involved include The Magick Heads, Electric Blood, Gina Rocco & the Rockettes, and Greg Franco & The Wandering Bear. Scott has also released several solo albums in several genres, including alternative rock, experimental instrumentals, and traditional folk music.

Scott has also drawn or painted the cover art for many Flying Nun album sleeves. During the 1980s he created the zine Every Secret Thing while living in Christchurch. He was, for many years, a teacher aide at Port Chalmers School at Port Chalmers. Scott is co-owner of an art gallery in Port Chalmers, Pea Sea Art.

His first solo album, The Creeping Unknown, was released in 2000 on Flying Nun Records.

Scott is also the father of Superorganism vocalist, B.

== Albums ==
=== Studio albums ===
List of studio albums, with New Zealand chart positions
Title	Album details	Peak chart positions
Title	Album details	NZ
The Creeping Unknown	Released: 2000; Label: Flying Nun Records (FNCD447); Format: CD	-
Songs of Otago's Past	Released: 2004; Label: Powertool Records (PT017); Format: CD	-
Tascam Hits	Released: 2007; Label: Powertool Records (PT065); Format: CD, DD	-
Ends Run Together	Released: 2010; Label: Flying Nun Records (FNCD507); Format: CD, DD, LP	-
The Professor and the Team	Released: 2013; Label: Robert Scott; Format: CDr	-
The Green House	Released: August 2014; Label: Flying Nun Records (FNCD537); Format: CD, DD, LP	34
On Golden Pond (with Alastair Galbraith)	Released: 2017; Label: Hangover Central Station (HCS03); Format: Cassette	-
Level 4 (with Dallas Henley)	Released: 2021; Label: Robert Smith; Format: CDr	-

=== Compilation albums ===
List of compilation albums
Title	Details
RePort	Released: 2016; Label: Thokei Tapes (TT04); Format: Cassette
The Greenhouse Roughs	Released: 2017; Label: Robert Smith; Format: CDr; All recorded during The Greenhouse Sessions 2012-2013

== Awards ==
=== Aotearoa Music Awards ===
The Aotearoa Music Awards (previously known as New Zealand Music Awards (NZMA)) are an annual awards night celebrating excellence in New Zealand music and have been presented annually since 1965.

Year	Nominee / work	Award	Result	Ref.
2017	Robert Scott (as part of The Clean)	New Zealand Music Hall of Fame	inductee	
