= Dimmer (band) =

New Zealand musical group

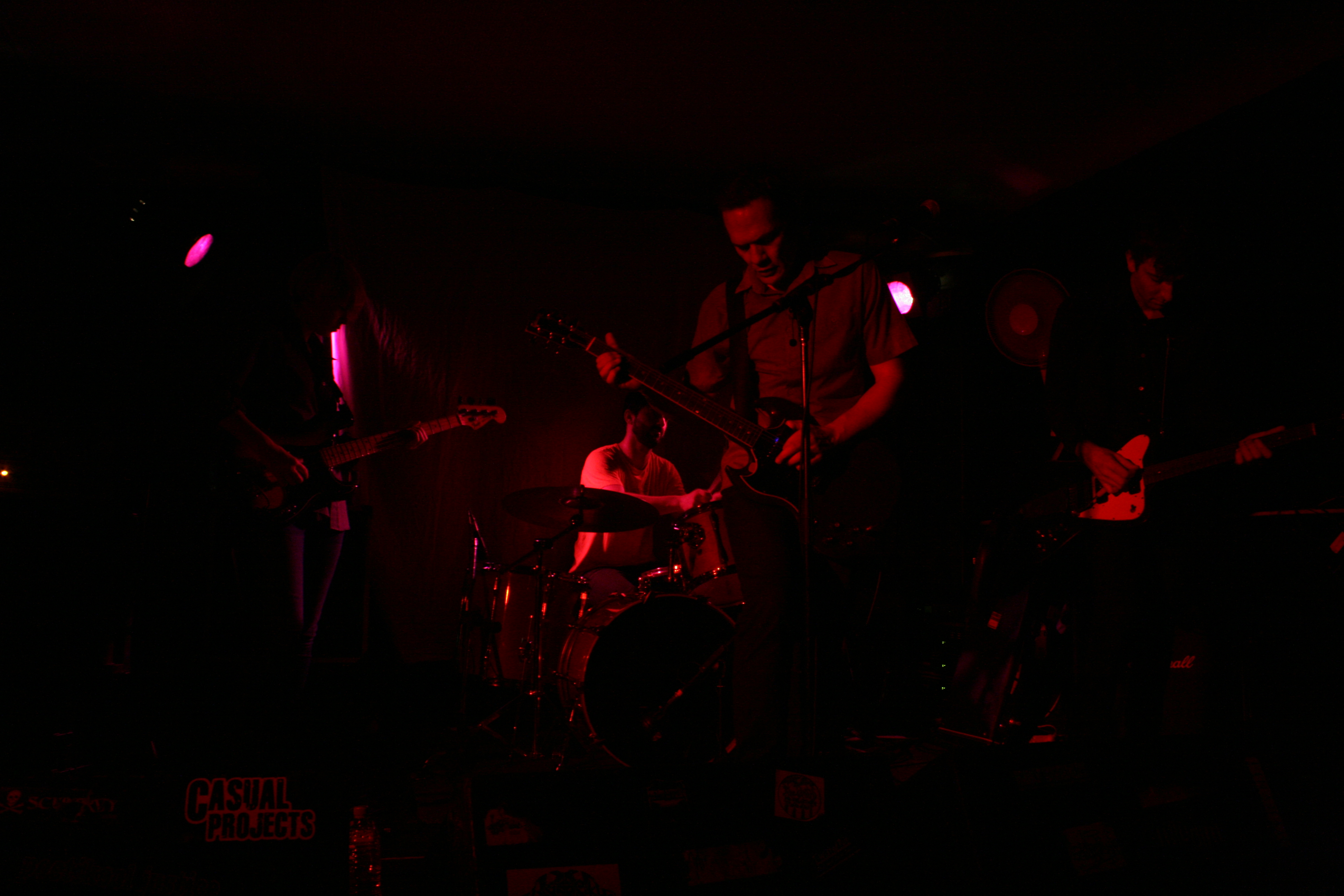
- Live at The Powerstation, Auckland 2018. L-R James Duncan, Gary Sullivan, Shayne Carter, Vaughan Williams.

Background information
- Origin: New Zealand
- Genre: Alternative rock
- Years active: 1994–2022
- Labels: Flying Nun; Sony; Festival Mushroom; Warner Music NZ
- Past members: Shayne Carter; Gary Sullivan; James Duncan; Justyn Pilbrow; Dino (Constantine) Karlis; Kelly Steven; Vaughan Williams; At least 33 other guests

Dimmer was the name under which New Zealand musician Shayne Carter (formerly of Straitjacket Fits, The DoubleHappys, and Bored Games) recorded and played music from 1994. It began as an umbrella name for jam sessions and short-lived band line-ups, then home recordings, then an ensemble with various members and guests. This evolution led to more settled four-piece rock band (especially from 2006 to 2010, when only the bassist changed). At least 41 musicians have been acknowledged as playing a part in Dimmer over 18 years, with Carter the only permanent fixture.

The last Dimmer recordings were made in 2009, with the band playing live shows through 2010. A short farewell tour announced the end of the band in 2012, and Carter began recording under his own name after that. Reformed and reformatted versions of Dimmer have occasionally played live shows, drawing on all four Dimmer albums, since 2018.

All four of Dimmer's albums were admired by critics, and all earned multiple New Zealand Music Award nominations. Non-album singles were released in 1995 and 1996, with debut album I Believe You Are A Star not following until 2001. In 2004 You've Got To Hear The Music was named New Zealand's Best Rock Album for the year, and Dimmer named Best Group. There My Dear saw Carter return to playing and recording with a live rock band in 2006, and return to the national album charts. Final album Degrees of Existence (2009) was recorded by the longest-lasting version of the band.

The 2025 film Life in One Chord, directed by Margaret Gordon, covers the lifespan of Dimmer in the broader story of Shayne Carter's life.

== Early years (1994–1996) ==
=== Dunedin ===
Straitjacket Fits split in 1994, "brought low by the vagaries of the international music industry". Interviewed in 2012, Shayne Carter said that "I was completely over rock. The Dimmer thing was totally anti-rock and I became interested in not only the groove thing but doing quiet music as well."

Carter moved back to Dunedin, later saying that he "dropped out, I suppose" and "wanted to get grounded after all my running around". While there, he began using the name Dimmer as "an umbrella thing...with me as the common denominator". The first Dimmer music came from jam sessions in Dunedin. Carter explained in 2012 that "I used the name Dimmer because I thought using your own name was really uncool."

For a short while, a three-piece version of Dimmer coalesced, with Peter Jefferies (This Kind of Punishment, Nocturnal Projections) on drums and Lou Allison on bass. Carter and Jefferies had collaborated on singles before – "Randolph's Going Home" in 1986, and "Knocked Out Or Thereabouts" in 1992.

I still wanted to rock when I formed Dimmer, because I needed to exorcise myself. I built a new set of songs with Lou and Peter. It's a thing with me to start from scratch with every new band. I have to contradict whatever I've just said and I also need to prove that I have somewhere left to go.
– Shayne Carter, Dead People I Have Known, 2019

On 17 June 1994 this line-up debuted with an "abrasive and deliberately uncommercial" seven-song set at the Empire Hotel. Reviewer Grant McDougall said that "Dimmer's songs are all about dynamics, explosive and meteoric. They starkly show for the first time ever what Carter can actually do by himself without the restrictions of having to complement another guitarist." The band toured New Zealand in August that year.

After August's tour, Allison moved back to the UK and Carter also broke with Peter Jefferies. "Peter was as talented as me...but I didn't want to share the table anymore."

=== "Crystalator" (b/w "Dawn's Coming In") ===
Dimmer's first official release, the 7" "Crystalator" single was recorded by Carter, Jefferies and Allison in 1994 and released in 1995 by Flying Nun (New Zealand) and Sub Pop (USA).

I put down a song with Lou on the bass and Peter Jefferies on the drums...at Fish Street Studios. [...] Peter's beat was murderous and Lou played a single note. I was exploring a new minimalism, trying to boil music down to a quintessential truth. 'Crytalator' is one of my favourite songs, even if it's an instrumental. In it, I hear anger, lamenting, and a giant "Fuck you" to [Straitjacket Fits record labels] Mushroom, Arista, and anyone else who'd suppressed me."
– Shayne Carter, Dead People I Have Known, 2019

"Crystalator" is an instrumental track. The New Zealand Herald describes it as "mangled noise... that ratcheted up and let rip with a barbed guitar riff". Flying Nun founder Roger Sheppard said that the song "sounds rollickingly amazing in that strident 'here I am, listen to me' way that only an instrumental can communicate. Who needs words when a guitar can spit out these sorts of sounds." The b-side was "Dawn's Coming In", which Carter says is "strong as well, even though with its hushed restraint it was totally the opposite of 'Crystalator'."

Both these tracks were also released on Flying Nun compilations. "Crystalator" appeared on Pop Eyed in 1996, and in 2005 "Dawn's Coming In" was included in Where in the World Is Wendy Broccoli? A collection of out of print Flying Nun singles 1981–1996 (along with "Knocked Out Or Thereabouts").

An early version of the Dimmer song "Seed" appeared on Star Trackers, a cassette that was given away with issue 4 of Australian label Spunk Records' Spunkzine in winter 1995. It was credited to Shayne Carter as a solo artist. ("Seed" would later be rerecorded for I Believe You Are A Star.)

Through the second half of the 1990s "[there was] the odd Dunedin solo gig but, for the most part, Shayne Carter disappeared from the public eye." Carter has called the period from 1995 "a lost weekend that actually lasted for six years".

=== "Don't Make Me Buy Out Your Silence" ===
After the dissolution of the "Crystalator" line-up, Carter continued jamming with Dunedin musicians. One short-lived line-up included bassist Chris Heazlewood (King Loser) and drummer Matt Middleton, who released what Carter caller "a series of near-genius cassettes" under the name Crude. Middleton soon moved to Melbourne.

A four-piece line-up of Carter, Heazlewood, Cameron Bain (guitar) and Robbie Yeats (drums, The Dead C) began sessions that were intended to result in a debut Dimmer album. Carter called this "the baddest early version of Dimmer", but the sessions ended in what he described as "tears, soap operas, that kinda stuff" and resulted in only a short EP. "Don't Make Me Buy Out Your Silence" was the only official release from this phase of Dimmer.

The song "Don't Make Me Buy Out Your Silence" was "partly inspired by Tricky" and written to capture a sense of paranoia. In 1996 it came out as a 7" vinyl release with "Pacer" as a b-side, and as a three-track CD EP which added "On the Road", a cover of "On the Road Again" by Canned Heat. This was the last Flying Nun release of Dimmer's, and the original releases only credited Carter. These credits changed ten years later when, as There My Dear bonus tracks, "Don't Make Me Buy Out Your Silence" acknowledged Bain and "Pacer" credited all band members.

None of the early Dimmer line-ups lasted long. In Carter's telling, Chris Heazlewood "became a dick. He...wrote 'Ace of Spades' on his scrawny chest when he played at the Big Day Out. He told people it was okay he was in with Carter because he was going to 'fuck it up'. I wondered if he was jealous, or if he resented me... He left Dimmer by rubbishing me on the internet, which hurt because he was showboating at my expense. I didn't speak to him for years, even after he apologised."

A video for "Don't Make Me Buy Out Your Silence" received NZ On Air funding and was directed by Steve Morrison.

No more music was released by Dimmer until 1999's "Evolution" single. In 2007 all five tracks from the "Crystalator" and "Don't Make Me Buy Out Your Silence" singles were included as bonus tracks on an Australian release of 2006 album There My Dear.

== Collaborative albums (1997–2006) ==
=== 1997–2001: I Believe You Are a Star ===
Carter moved to Auckland in 1997 and, inspired by "new music [including] avant-electronica and whatever else was fresh and non-mainstream", switched from playing rock music to producing tracks on Pro Tools.

"After I put out the first album, there’s all this 'it doesn't sound like Straitjacket Fits'. Well, no, it doesn't. That's why I quit the band – because I didn't want to be doing that. [...It] actually took me five or six years to put together. That came on the back of the Straitjackets, and I think I was disillusioned with the whole music thing at the time. I wanted to figure out a lot of things in my head."
- Shayne Carter, 2009

Most of the writing and recording that eventually became Dimmer's first album ("[the song] "Smoke"...took about four years to write") took place at Carter's homes over a number of years, with drummer Gary Sullivan (JPSE, Chug, The Stereo Bus) the other main participant. At least one song, "Seed", predated Carter's move to Auckland, an early version of it having been one of the tracks recorded in the mainly-abandoned Dunedin sessions of 1995.

Locations for Carter and Sullivan's sessions included the former Ponsonby Road premises of the store Beautiful Music, then later Norfolk Street, where Carter spent an advance from Sony Records to have either a shipping container or Portacom building (depending on which recollection of Carter's you trust) installed in his backyard by crane.

In 1999 the first release from these sessions, "Evolution", came out as a CD single with "Sad Guy" and the Tryhard Remix of "Evolution" as b-sides. The song's video featured Carter's father playing an older version of Shayne. It was directed by Darryl Ward and funded by NZ On Air.

It was two years before Dimmer's debut album, I Believe You Are A Star, which included "Evolution" and a reworked "Seed", was released in 2001. The writing and production of all but one track ("Sad Guy") are solely credited to Carter. Five other musicians (including Bic Runga) appear in what The Listener called "hardly essential cameos". The album had a seven-week run in the New Zealand album charts, starting at #17 and getting as high as #13.

Videos were made for "Seed", "I Believe You Are a Star", and "Drop You Off". In 2018, I Believe You Are A Star was released on vinyl for the first time. At the time Carter said he still considered it the best album he'd ever made.

==== Critical reception ====
I Believe You Are a Star received high critical acclaim, including a 5-star review from the New Zealand Herald that called it "a dark wonder", "a great album", and "one to which all other New Zealand albums in 2001 will be compared". It was especially noted for its electronic feel, "introverted minimalism" and its contrast to the rock music Carter had made before. As reviewer Nick Bollinger put it in The Listener, "Carter could have ridden the momentum they [Straitjacket Fits] created by promptly launching another axe-wielding line-up. Instead he cleared the decks, and began a long process of finding, and then refining, a whole other concept. ... The computer is the primary compositional tool here. Harmonic figures circle repetitively, vocal lines are spare and dislocated in an electronic landscape. Like hip-hop, the music seems to be led by the rhythms." Gary Steel's review in Metro magazine called it "possibly one of the most original, daring, and outrageously well-defined pieces of musical art to have emanated from this country".

Released seven years after the last Straitjacket Fits record, I Believe You Are A Star is described by music historian John Dix as "one of the great New Zealand 'comeback' albums", and by music critic Gary Steel (writing in 2016) as Carter's "masterpiece". At the 2002 New Zealand Music Awards Dimmer was nominated for Best Music Video (for "Seed") and Best Album Art.

At the 2001 bNet NZ Music Awards the album won Best Rock Release and Carter was named Most Outstanding Musician, although that trophy was lost at the ceremony.

=== 2003–2006: You've Got to Hear the Music and All Looks the Same at Night ===
While working on the next Dimmer album, Carter listened to "heaps of Miles Davis and Thelonious Monk", which became a point of contention with his record label, Sony. In an interview with Pavement magazine, Carter said "I went up there [to Sony] one day and I got to raid the closets [...] I grabbed Thelonious Monk because they had a lot of Monk records. One of the people who is quite highly powered in that company was quite upset by the fact I was grabbing Thelonious Monk instead of Creed records because that's what I should be aiming for. To me, that pretty much summed up the whole opposites mentality."

Sony dropped Dimmer before the second album, leaving Carter feeling "like a failure". He shifted to Festival Mushroom Records.

Inspired by jazz musicians like Monk and Davis, Carter decided that on his next album he "wanted to hear mistakes and fumbly human stuff. I wanted it to sound like a bunch of tunes that people could sit around and clap their hands to". Not wanting this album to take as long as the first, he had written most of the songs "in a month last year [2003]". The release was delayed while Dimmer changed record companies.

You've Got to Hear the Music was released in 2004. Stylistic differences with I Believe You Are a Star included instrumentation – Carter recorded himself on acoustic guitar and used "real drums on all the tracks" – and the number (and range) of players included. This album featured 19 musicians other than Carter, included backing vocals from Anika Moa and a returning Bic Runga, strings arranged by Graeme Downes, and (on "Getting What You Give") the Fat Freddy's Drop horn section.

The album name came from a conversation Carter and Gary Sullivan had about The Third Man.

Music videos were made for "Getting What You Give", "Come Here", and "Case". NZ On Screen calls "Case"'s video a "piece of stop motion cleverness" for which "at least 3,080 Polaroid photographs appear to have been taken".

By this time, Dimmer had seen Carter collaborate with more than two dozen other musicians but he still described it as "essentially [...] a solo project. [...] It doesn't seem cool if it just has your name there. It seems cooler to have some sort of umbrella, something that makes it a bit more enigmatic." You've Got to Hear the Music was the last Dimmer recording project to fit this description.

A live Dimmer performance broadcast on Radio New Zealand in 2004 featured Carter, Anika Moa (guitar/vocals), Willy Scott (drums), Ned Ngatae (guitar), Mike Hall (bass), Andy Morton (keyboards), and Heather Mansfield (glockenspiel). Mansfield was the only one not to have played on the album, although she would appear on 2006's There My Dear. They played songs from You've Got to Hear the Music and I Believe You Are a Star.

==== You've Got to Hear the Music: Critical reception and awards ====
Music critics met You've Got to Hear the Music positively. Common themes included positive comparisons to I Believe You Are A Star and praise for Carter continuing to produce styles of music different to his previous work.

John Dix describes You've Got to Hear the Music as "another evolutionary step – as different to its predecessor as Dimmer is to Straitjacket Fits." In a four-star New Zealand Herald review Russell Baillie called the album "not quite as gripping or experimental as its predecessor", but said that "with its bent grooves and odd wiring, You've Got to Hear the Music is an album that stays intriguing on repeat listens." Writing for The Listener, Nick Bollinger declared the album Carter's "masterpiece". Compared to I Believe You Are A Star, he saw it as "more generous, both melodically and emotionally". He noted the influence of black American music, as well as Carter's increased mastery of electronic music production and return to "real" songwriting. In sum, Bollinger wrote, "Dimmer's second album has a depth and soul that others don't come near".

AudioCulture notes its "pronounced soul and groove influences", while in MZ Musician magazine, Jacob Connor noted that "Dimmer's electro-folk musings simmer to a laconic groove", and said that "a restrained elegance makes the music replayable". He concluded that the album is "a rewarding recording from a national treasure."

At that year's New Zealand Music Awards it won Best Rock Album, and Dimmer was named Best Group (as well as being nominated for Album of the Year, Single of the Year ("Getting What You Give"), Best Cover Art, and Best Music Video). The album spent five weeks in the New Zealand top 40 album charts, peaking at #19, and earned Gold certification.

=== All Looks the Same at Night compilation ===
In 2006 a compilation of tracks selected from Dimmer's first two albums was released internationally by Rogue Records. All Looks the Same at Night included one disc of 13 songs, and one of seven music videos.

== Rock band years (2006–2012) ==
=== 2006: There My Dear ===
Following the Straitjacket Fits reunion tour of 2005, Carter returned to playing guitar with more traditional rock line-ups.

"My first albums as Dimmer were quiet and introverted as a kickback against all that rock glory. But Dimmer’s been going a while now and when I went back and felt that rock glory, I thoroughly enjoyed it".
- Shayne Carter, September 2006

Despite changing away from the electronic music-making approach of the first two Dimmer albums, Carter kept the name for this new phase. By this time the only previous Dimmer release to come from a rock-style line-up, the Flying Nun singles, were 10 and 11 years old. Carter later said that "for a while there, I rejected my past. I’ve kind of come full circle and embraced it again."

In 2006 Carter put together a Dimmer line-up that he described as "pretty much a pick-up band": guitarist James Duncan (SJD, Punches), drummer Dino (Constantine) Karlis (HDU), and bassist Justyn Pilbrow (Elemeno P). He had songs that he'd already written on guitar, and after "two or three weeks' rehearsal" the band recorded the third Dimmer album, There My Dear, in a local bowling club.

"I’m not a computer programmer. I couldn’t be fucked doing drum patterns, and all that kind of stuff. The songs were quite raw, and I didn’t want to overdo it. I just wrote it, put together a band and taught them the songs and we recorded it live."
- Shayne Carter, September 2006

Among eight guest musicians Anika Moa and Bic Runga returned as backing vocalists and Don McGlashan played euphonium on two tracks.

There My Dear was released by Warner Music NZ, debuting at number 7 on New Zealand's album charts (Dimmer's first and only top-ten placing, and the start of a seven-week run) and receiving two nominations at the 2007 New Zealand Music Awards, both in technical categories. Aspects of the album, most obviously its title and thematic origins in a relationship break-up, were inspired by Marvin Gaye's Here My Dear. Videos were made for singles "Don't Even See Me" and "You're Only Leaving Hurt", the latter directed by Gary Sullivan (who appeared on every Dimmer album except this one) and granted $5,000 from NZ On Air.

In a four-star review for the New Zealand Herald, Scott Kara said: "This is a break-up album which at first may seem too maudlin, both musically and emotionally. [...But] then there's Carter. He's not so brooding on There My Dear, his guitar lurches and breathes to full effect...And his songwriting is tops...Carter is often held up as New Zealand rock royalty. On There My Dear he confirms himself as a soul man as well. Although they're sad break-up songs, Carter sounds pretty happy to be playing them. It's a feelgood album with a soul kind of feeling." Critic Simon Sweetman called it "one of the great break-up albums", and in The Listener Nick Bollinger called it "Dimmer's broken-hearted masterpiece".

In 2007, label Longtime Listener released a version of There My Dear in Australia (LSNR82007). As well as the full album, this release also included five bonus tracks – the entirety of the "Crystalator" and "Don't Make Me Buy Out Your Silence" singles of the 1990s. Until this neither single had been available on CD (although "Crystalator" and "Dawn's Coming In" had been on different Flying Nun compilations).

=== 2007–2012: Degrees of Existence, the Last Train to Brockville, and band break-up ===
After There My Dear was released, bassist Justyn Pilbrow was replaced by Kelly Steven (later known as Kelly Sherrod). She had been a member of Voom and was already James Duncan's bandmate in the duo Punches, the two having first played together in The Pencils. Carter, Duncan, Steven, and Karlis remained together until Karils' departure in 2009.

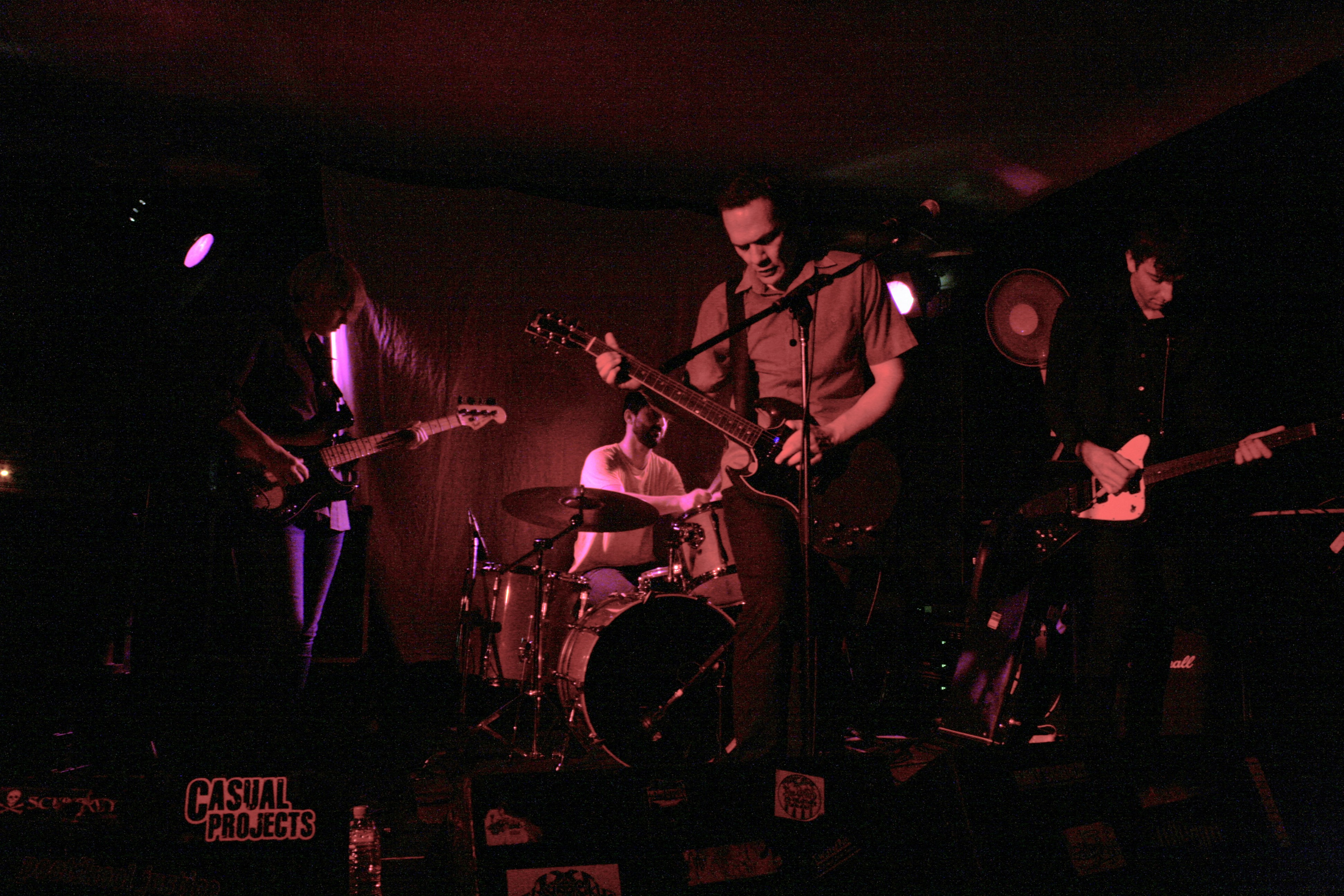
Live at The Step Inn, Brisbane, 2008

Their 2007 trip to the US, which included shows with the Brian Jonestown Massacre and at South By Southwest, was Dimmer's first tour outside New Zealand – Carter hadn't played in America since Straitjacket Fits in 1993. Shows in Australia followed in November that year. Dimmer continued performing live into 2009, appearing at Auckland's Homegrown festival in March. Comparing 2009's Dimmer to the incarnation that had recorded There My Dear, Carter called it "a far more confident band, and a far more together band. We are actually quite close as people."

The same four began recording Dimmer's fourth and final album, Degrees of Existence, in Auckland in 2008. Sessions lasted until 2009. Karlis moved to Berlin during recording, so Michael (Mikie) Prain (Die! Die! Die!) and original drummer Gary Sullivan played on two tracks each. The album was released in July 2009 and Sullivan stayed with the band for the touring that followed, including dates in the USA.

Degrees of Existence spent four weeks in the New Zealand album charts, peaking at #18 in August 2009. It was selected by the New Zealand Herald's music reviewers as the year's second-best album. Amplifier called it "possibly the best album Mr Carter and co have released", and placed it (along with guitarist James Duncan's solo release, Hello-Fi) in the Top Twenty Albums of 2009. Critic Graham Reid said Degrees of Existence was "better and more consistent than that Dimmer debut [I Believe You Are a Star] and also than most of the Fits' later material...A real keeper of depth and intensity." The titular single "Degrees of Existence" was shortlisted for the 2009 APRA Silver Scroll Award (Dermarnia Lloyd of Cloudboy performed it at the ceremony) and the next year Degrees of Existence was nominated for Best Rock Album at the New Zealand Music Awards.

=== Last Train to Brockville (2011) and Dimmer's "final" shows (2012) ===
In 2011, Carter's 'Last Train to Brockville' tour saw him play songs from his full career – Bored Games, The DoubleHappys, Straitjacket Fits, and Dimmer – with backing from Sullivan on drums and bassist Vaughan Williams. At the time Carter said that he had been composing melodies – "about 50 pieces of music" – which he expected to lead to another Dimmer album.

Before this putative fifth album ever happened, in 2012, Carter decided to end Dimmer and operate under his own name. A four-piece consisting of the 'Brockville' trio plus James Duncan played Dimmer's two "final" live shows in Auckland and Wellington.

=== After Dimmer ===
Shayne Carter was part of The Adults in 2011 and 2012, and released solo piano album Offsider in 2016. Also in 2016 he began playing shows with Don McGlashan (Blam Blam Blam, The Front Lawn, The Mutton Birds), a musical partnership that led to Carter playing in McGlashan's band The Others alongside James Duncan in 2021.

James Duncan recorded his second solo album, Vanishing (2012), in Berlin. He also remained part of SJD's band, and in 2016 played bass for Carter's 'Offsider' tour of New Zealand. In 2021 Duncan and Carter recorded and, but for covid-related cancelations, would have toured as members of The Others, Don McGlashan's band.

Gary Sullivan remains a key collaborator of Carter's, drumming on the Offsider album and tour. In 2011–12 the pair had both been a part of The Adults, a project led by Jon Toogood and also including former Dimmer recruits Anika Moa and Nick Roughan.

Dino Karlis joined Brian Jonestown Massacre. He plays drums and percussion on the albums Revelation, which was recorded in Berlin 2012–14, and Musique de Film Imaginé. He also remains part of HDU, the members of which reunite occasionally.

Kelly Sherrod (née Steven) moved to Nashville, and was based there while she and James Duncan (who was still in Auckland) worked on the first Punches album in 2011. She joined Ryan Bingham's band in 2012. Her solo project Proteins of Magic began 2021, and toured New Zealand as a support act to Dimmer in 2022.

Justyn Pilbrow left Elemeno P in 2009. He moved to Los Angeles and became a producer for bands including The Neighbourhood, co-wroting a number of songs including "Daddy Issues", which has over 1,000,000,000 streams on Spotify. He joined Elemeno P's reunion in 2017.

2022 touring member Louisa Nicklin has released two solo albums, Louisa Nicklin (2021) and The Big Sulk (2024). Her 2024 single, 'Thick', was produced by Shayne Carter. Nicklin was a touring member of Mermaidens in 2024 and played on Jazmine Mary's album I Want to Rock and Roll in 2025.

== Reunions, tours, and live album (2018-) ==
"When I was younger, I thought reunion tours were quite undignified. But I'm older now, and I've decided that they're actually extremely dignified if done the right way."
- Shayne Carter, November 2018

=== "Dimmer and special guests", King's Arms, February 2018 ===
The imminent closure of Auckland venue the King's Arms in 2018 led to a one-off Dimmer performance by Carter, Sullivan, Williams and Duncan – the same four who played 2012's "final" shows. It was one of the King's Arms' last performances. At the same gig, on 9 February 2018, Carter also reunited with Straitjacket Fits bandmates John Collie and Mark Petersen to play songs from that band's catalogue. Bass (originally played by David Wood) was shared by Williams and Duncan. This was billed as "special guests" rather than a Straitjacket Fits performance.

=== Dimmer and Straitjacket Fits, November–December 2018 ===
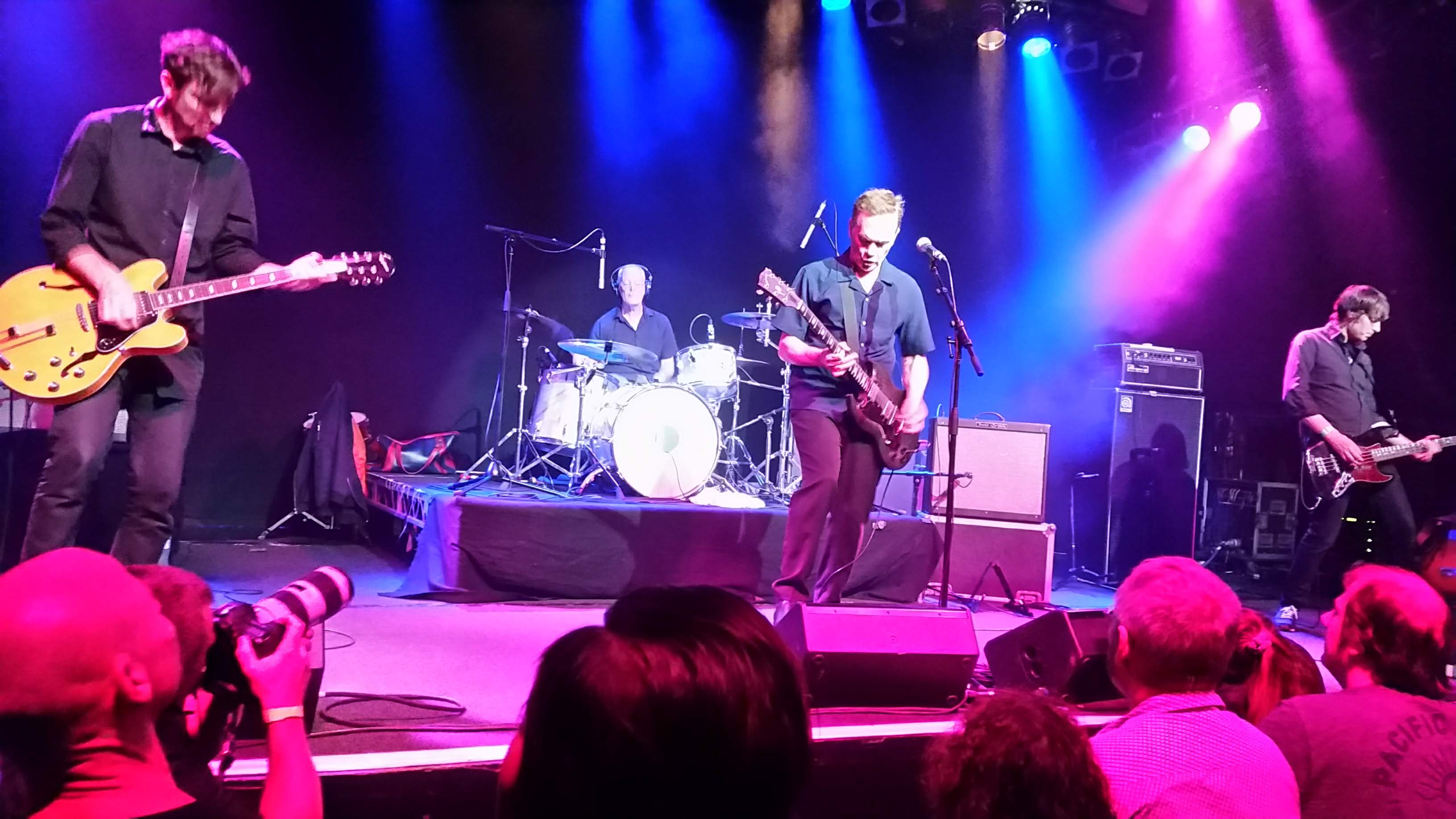
Dimmer playing live in Auckland, December 2018.

The same band line-ups from February's one-off show played five more dates in Auckland, Wellington, Christchurch and Dunedin near the end of the year. Unlike February's show, this tour saw the name Straitjacket Fits used.

=== I Believe You Are a Star 20th/21st anniversary tour, 2022 ===
The 20th anniversary of I Believe You Are a Star fell in 2021. A planned tour was cancelled due to the COVID pandemic and was rescheduled for September–October 2022 with shows in Wellington, Christchurch, Auckland and Dunedin.

Proteins of Magic, a solo project of former Dimmer bassist Kelly Sherrod, was a support act.

An expanded seven-member band had been announced for 2021, but neither Nick Roughan nor Lachlan Anderson (Die! Die! Die!) could commit to the 2022 tour. Roughan, who contributed to Dimmer's first three albums and would have been playing keyboards and live electronics, was replaced by Durham Fenwick (Green Grove). Bassist Anderson would have been new to Dimmer, but instead James Duncan shifted from guitar to bass. Louisa Nicklin (guitar/vocals) and Neive Strang (percussion/vocals) were new additions alongside stalwarts Shayne Carter and Gary Sullivan (drums).

=== Live at the Hollywood ===
The three nights that the band played in Auckland in 2022 were recorded by RNZ. A selection have been turned into the album Live at the Hollywood, which was released in October 2023 on Shayne Carter's new label, Crystalator Records.

The Hollywood line-up toured New Zealand again in November and December 2023.

== Credited Dimmer members and musicians ==
Other than Shayne Carter, more than 40 musicians have been involved in Dimmer in some way. 38 are credited on Dimmer recordings. The scale of their contributions run from full band members in 2006–09, to 24 people who appeared on only one or two songs. Others never recorded with the band but have played in live shows since Dimmer stopped releasing albums.

=== Early Dunedin years, including the Flying Nun singles (1995–1996) ===
==== Acknowledged but never recorded ====
- Matt Middleton, drums

==== "Crystalator" b/w "Dawn's Coming In" ====
- Lou Allison, bass
- Peter Jefferies, drums

==== "Don't Make Me Buy Out Your Silence" ====
Uncredited on the original release, but named on the There My Dear CD that included these songs as bonus tracks. Also played in the abandoned album sessions of 1996.

- Cameron Bain, guitar ("Don't Make Me Buy Out Your Silence", "Pacer")
- Chris Heazlewood, bass ("Pacer")
- Robbie Yeats, drums ("Pacer")

=== Band members (from 2006) ===
	There My Dear 2006	Degrees of Existence 2009	Touring band 2009–10	Live shows 2012 & 2018	2022 national tour	Live at the Hollywood (2023)
Guitar, vocals	Shayne Carter					
Guitar	James Duncan				Louisa Nicklin (guitar/vocals)	
Bass	Justyn Pilbrow	Kelly Steven		Vaughan Williams	James Duncan	James Duncan (bass/guitar) & Kelly Sherrod (née Steven) (Crystalator)
Drums	Dino Karlis		Gary Sullivan			
Keyboards, electronics	n/a				Durham Fenwick	
Vocals, percussion	n/a				Neive Strang	

=== Non-band members credited on albums (2001–2009) ===
- This table excludes band members listed above for There My Dear and Degrees of Existence.
- Ordered by number of separate releases played on, then by total songs. Numbers represent the tracks on which each musician played.

Name	Main instrument(s)	I Believe You Are a Star	You've Got to Hear the Music	There My Dear	Degrees of Existence
Gary Sullivan	Drums, fruit	All	4,5,6,8,10,11	—	4,9
Nick Roughan	Guitar, loops, organ	10	1,8,10,11	4	—
Bic Runga	Backing vocals	2	6,7	8,9	—
Anika Moa	Vocals, Backing vocals	—	1,2,3,7,11	1,2,3,4,7,8,9	—
Anna Coddington	Backing vocals	—	—	1,2,3,4,9	10
Andy Morton	Keys, drum programming	2	3,6,7	—	—
Tom Watson	Trumpet	9	—	—	7
Mike Hall	Bass, flute	3,4,5,6,9	—	—	—
Willy Scott	Drums	—	2,6,9	—	—
Ned Ngatae	Guitar, bass	—	2,3,7	—	—
Nick Gaffaney	Drums	—	3,7	—	—
Sean Donnelly	Strings, synths, loops	—	5,7	—	—
Don McGlashan	Euphonium	—	—	2,3	—
Michael (Mikie) Prain	Drums	—	—	—	2,8
Tristan Dingemans	Guitar	11	—	—	—
Toby Laing; Joe Lindsay; Warren Maxwell; Levani Vosasi	Trumpet; Trombone; Saxophone; Percussion	—	3 ("Getting; What You; Give")	—	—
Jenny Banks; Leah Johnston; Erica Stitchbury; Alex Vaatstra	Violin; Violin; Violin; Viola	—	4 ("Only; One That; Matters")	—	—
Jessica MacCormick	Backing vocals	—	7	—	—
Heather Mansfield	Chime bars	—	—	6	—
Harry Cundy	Trumpet	—	—	7	—
Dean Roberts	Guitar	—	—	8	—
Rebekah Davies; Hannah Curwood	Backing vocals	—	—	—	10 ("Too Far; Gone to Care")

== Discography ==
=== Albums ===
Year	Title	Details	Peak chart positions	Certifications
Year	Title	Details	NZ	Certifications
2001	I Believe You Are A Star	Released: 21 May 2001; Label: Sony Music; Catalogue: 5024222000	13	
2004	You've Got To Hear the Music	Label: Festival Mushroom Records; Catalogue: 337892	19	NZ: Gold
2006	There My Dear	Label: Warner Music; Catalogue: 5101-14876-2; Australian CD release (2007): Longtime Listener LISN82007	7	
2009	Degrees of Existence	Released: 27 July 2009; Label: Warner Music; Catalogue: 5186551402	18	
2023	Live at the Hollywood	Released: 27 July 2009; Label: Crystalator Records; Catalogue: CRY001	30	

=== Compilation ===
Year	Title	Details
2007	All Looks The Same at Night	Released: 6 March 2006; Label: Rogue Records; Catalogue: R6313CD

=== Singles ===
Year	Title	Peak chart positions	Album
Year	Title	NZ	Album
1995	"Crystalator"	—	Non-album single
1996	"Don't Make Me Buy Out Your Silence"	—	Non-album single
1999	"Evolution"	—	I Believe You Are A Star
2003	"Getting What You Give"	—	You've Got To Hear The Music
2008	"Degrees of Existence"	—	Degrees of Existence
2008	"Cold Water"	—	Degrees of Existence
"—" denotes a recording that did not chart or was not released in that territory.
