= Melt (Straitjacket Fits album) =

Studio album by Straitjacket Fits
- Released: 1990
- Recorded: July–August 1990, Airforce Studios, New Zealand and Platinum Studios, Australia
- Genres: Alternative rock, Dunedin sound
- Length: 43:27
- Language: English
- Label: Flying Nun Records
- Producer: Gavin McKillop

Straitjacket Fits chronology
Hail (1988)	Melt (1990)	Blow (1993)

Singles from Melt
- 1. "Bad Note for a Heart" Released: 1990; 2. "Down in Splendour (double 7")" Released: 1990; 3. "Down in Splendour (Video/CD)" Released: 1991; 4. "Roller Ride" Released: 1991

Professional ratings
Review scores
Source	Rating
AllMusic	4/5 stars

Melt is the second album from Dunedin, New Zealand band Straitjacket Fits. It was the last to feature the original line-up of Shayne Carter, Andrew Brough, John Collie and David Wood; Brough was to leave before the third album, Blow. The album reached no. 13 on the New Zealand music charts, and sold 40,000 copies in the United States.

The album spawned three singles, "Bad Note for a Heart", "Down in Splendour", and "Roller Ride". Of these, only "Bad Note for a Heart" charted (reaching no. 25 in the New Zealand charts), yet the Brough single "Down in Splendour" was later listed at number 32 in 2001 on the Australasian Performing Right Association's 75th anniversary poll of New Zealand's top 100 songs of all time. The music video for "Bad Note for a Heart" won the award for best New Zealand music video of 1990.

The album was seen as being truer to the band's sound than the previous album (Hail), and closer to the live sound and to the sound of the band's debut EP Life in One Chord. The album was described as "...a culmination of searing guitars that never collide and are always textured with the rhythm section's simple powerful backbone."

== Production ==
The album was recorded at Airforce Studios in Auckland and Platinum Studios in Australia during July and August 1990.

== Critical reception ==
AllMusic wrote that "once the listener gets past the distracting production ... this is probably the Straitjacket Fits' strongest set of songs." Trouser Press wrote that if the production "occasionally yields mush, it also results in brilliance: a swooping, swooning, swelling, surging, soaring (and all that) rush that beautifully captures the intensity of the band’s live shows." The Chicago Reader praised the "gorgeous sweet-and-sour vibe—lush and abrasive, peppy and mournful, thrilling and sinister." The Guardian called Melt the band's best album, writing that "Down in Splendour" "shows off their exquisite vocal harmonies and twin-guitar interplay without losing any of the tension that would ultimately destroy the group."

== Track listing ==
No.	Title	Length
1.	"Bad Note For A Heart"	3:48
2.	"Missing Presumed Drowned"	2:52
3.	"Melt Against Yourself"	3:37
4.	"Headwind"	3:24
5.	"Down In Splendour"	3:41
6.	"A.P.S"	. 4:23
7.	"Quiet Come"	3:23
8.	"Such A Daze"	3:05
9.	"Skin To Wear"	3:18
10.	"Hand In Mine"	2:53
11.	"Roller Ride"	3:09
12.	"Cast Stone"	6:00
