= It's My Sin =

Studio album by Jan Hellriegel
- Released: 7 September 1992
- Recorded: December 1991–March 1992
- Studio: Mountain (Tauranga); Mandrill (Auckland); Helen Young (Auckland); Auckland Audio (Auckland)
- Genre: Pop rock
- Length: 48:14
- Label: East West
- Producer: Nick Morgan; JD Souther

Jan Hellriegel chronology
It's My Sin (1992)	Tremble (1995)

Singles from It's My Sin
- 1. "Waves" Released: 1990; 2. "The Way I Feel" Released: 1992; 3. "No Idea" Released: 1992; 4. "It's My Sin" Released: 1993; 5. "Wings Of Steel" Released: 1993; 6. "Westy Gals"

It's My Sin is the first studio album by the New Zealand singer-songwriter Jan Hellriegel, released on 7 September 1992 by East West Records. The record spent 11 weeks in the New Zealand album charts, peaking at No. 5. Its success resulted in two wins for Hellriegel at the 1993 New Zealand Music Awards - Best Songwriter and Most Promising Female - along with four other nominations.

== Background and development ==
After the disbandment of her former band Cassandra's Ears, Hellriegel was signed to East West's parent company Warner Music International as a solo artist in 1989. Although she did not intend to embark on a solo career, she took up the label's offer as she was willing to move on from working at her father's business and had numerous unpublished songs that she wished to do more with. Attempts by her label to pair her with a number of co-writers to develop songs for what became It's My Sin, including Eagles songwriter JD Souther, were unsuccessful, and in the end she wrote all but one of the songs on the album by herself.

Production was mostly by Nick Morgan. The only exceptions were the tracks "No Idea" and "Westy Gals", collaborative efforts between him and Souther. The Mutton Birds' frontman, Don McGlashan, contributed to musical arrangements on the album, which also had a number of other notable New Zealand musical figures, including Greg Johnson and Rima Te Wiata. Recording mostly took place in December 1991 and January 1992 at Mountain Studios in Tauranga, though the Souther-produced tracks were recorded in Auckland as late as March 1992. The album was then mixed at Marmalade Studios in Wellingtonand mastered at Studios 301 in Sydney.

Several songs on the album contain autobiographical themes about Hellriegel's formative years. These include "Westy Gals", an "interpretation of her [hometown] West Auckland" and its "masses of sprawling boredom", and "Richmond Rd Revisited", which tells of the "depressing time" she experienced while living in Grey Lynn.

== Release and singles ==
Six singles were released from It's My Sin. An early version of "Waves", which did not chart, was released in 1990. The official lead single, "The Way I Feel", co-written by Hellriegel and Mark Petersen (Hellriegel's former bandmate from her days in Working With Walt) was the most successful, spending 10 weeks in the New Zealand singles chart and peaking at No. 4. The following single, "No Idea", only spent three weeks in the charts and peaked at No. 17. Both singles were released in 1992. The title track and "Wings of Steel" were released as the next singles from the album in 1993. Album closer "Westy Gals" was also released as a radio-only single at an unknown date. The latter three singles all failed to chart. Two non-album tracks, "Burger Generation" and "Stupidest Thing," appeared as B-sides on the single releases of "No Idea" and "It's My Sin" respectively; "Burger Generation" later appeared on Hellriegel's 2013 compilation album Lost Songs but "Stupidest Thing" remains unreleased elsewhere.

Following the release of the album, critical reception was very positive. Reviews by The New Zealand Herald and Sunday Scene both awarded it a perfect five stars, the Sound Advice newspaper gave it 3.5 stars, and numerous other reviewers were well-pleased with the album, complimenting Hellriegel's "rich, robust vocals," "neat guitar melodies," and the overall "great collection of music." Comparisons to Chrissie Hynde were also often mentioned in reviews. The commercial and critical success was a surprise to Hellriegel, who was not expecting many people beyond her friends to purchase the album or its singles.

== Track listing ==
Track listing and song credits adapted from CD liner notes. Except where noted, all tracks are written by Jan Hellriegel and produced by Nick Morgan.

No.	Title	Writer(s)	Producer(s)	Length
1.	"The Way I Feel"	Jan Hellriegel; Mark Petersen		3:54
2.	"It's My Sin"			3:43
3.	"Richmond Rd Revisited (Note: Recorded as such in original physical versions, though streaming platforms now list it as "Richmond Road Revisited.")"			3:34
4.	"I'm Alive"			4:29
5.	"Viva Voca"			3:17
6.	"Waves"			3:49
7.	"Surprise"			3:34
8.	"Jumping"			4:26
9.	"Wings of Steel"			3:49
10.	"All the Best Thoughts"			3:56
11.	"No Idea"		JD Souther; Nick Morgan	4:13
12.	"Westy Gals"		Souther; Morgan	5:26
Total length:				48:14

== Personnel ==
Credits adapted from CD and cassette (Note: Both are used as the information provided in the liner notes slightly differs between the two versions of the album; for instance, the cassette version omits Tony Lumsden from the credits while the digitized liner notes of the CD version do not provide the details of the additional musicians or design personnel.) liner notes.

Jan Hellriegel Band

- Jan Hellriegel – vocals, backing vocals, arrangements
- Mark Bell – guitar, backing vocals (tracks 4, 7, 10), arrangements
- Wayne Bell – drums, arrangements
- Tony Lumsden – bass guitar, backing vocals (tracks 4, 7, 10), arrangements
- Mark Petersen – guitar, backing vocals (tracks 1–4, 6, 7, 10), arrangements

Additional musicians

- Pip Anderton – backing vocals (track 9)
- Sally-Ann Brown – cello (track 3)
- Paul Cantell – alto sax (track 12)
- Rodger Fox – trombone (track 12)
- Steve Garden – drums (tracks 11, 12)
- Greg Johnson – trumpet (track 12)
- Mikey Havoc – backing vocals (track 4)
- Don McGlashan – arrangements
- Stuart Pearce – keyboards (track 12)
- Rima Te Wiata – backing vocals (track 8)
- Zan Wright – backing vocals (track 1)

Technical personnel

- Nick Morgan – production, recording, mixing
- JD Souther – production
- John Harvey – mixing
- Graham Myhre – recording

Design personnel

- Melanie Bridge – photography, cover design
- Michelle Cutelli – hair and make up
- Stephen Langdon – photography assistant

== Charts ==
Chart (1992)	Peak position
New Zealand Albums (RMNZ)	5
