= 2004 New Zealand Music Awards =

New Zealand music industry awards

- Awarded for: Excellence in New Zealand music
- Date: 22 September 2004
- Location: Aotea Centre, Auckland
- Country: New Zealand
- Hosted by: Jaquie Brown; Mikey Havoc
- Website: http://www.nzmusicawards.co.nz

Television/radio coverage
- Network: C4

The 2004 New Zealand Music Awards was the 38th holding of the annual ceremony featuring awards for musical artists based in or originating from New Zealand. The awards were hosted by Jaquie Brown and Mikey Havoc at Aotea Centre on 22 September 2004. Eligible works were released between 1 January 2003 and 31 May 2004. The ceremony was screened on television channel C4 the following day.

== Nominees and winners ==
Three new categories were introduced in 2004: Best Rock Album, the People's Choice Award and Airplay Record of the Year.

Winners are listed first and highlighted in boldface.

Key
† – Non-technical award
‡ – Technical award

Album of the Year†	Single of the Year†
Sponsored by PlayStation 2: **Scribe – The Crusader**; Brooke Fraser – What to Do with Daylight; Dimmer – You've Got to Hear the Music; Goodshirt – Fiji Baby; The Phoenix Foundation – Horsepower	**Scribe – "Stand Up"**; Brooke Fraser – "Lifeline"; Dimmer – "Getting What You Give"; Goldenhorse – "Maybe Tomorrow"; Goodshirt – "Buck It Up"
Best Group†	Breakthrough Artist of the Year†
Sponsored by Export Gold: **Dimmer – You've Got to Hear the Music**; Elemeno P – Love & Disrespect; Goodshirt – Fiji Baby	Sponsored by Export Gold: **Brooke Fraser – What to Do with Daylight**; Adeaze – Always and for Real; Minuit – The 88
Best Male Solo Artist†	Best Female Solo Artist†
**Scribe – The Crusader**; Greg Johnson – Here comes the Caviar; Nathan Haines – Squire tor Hire	**Brooke Fraser – What to Do with Daylight**; Bic Runga – Live in Concert with the Christchurch Symphony; Hayley Westenra – Pure
Highest Selling NZ Album†	Highest Selling NZ Single†
**Hayley Westenra – Pure**; Bic Runga – Beautiful Collision; Scribe – The Crusader	**Ben Lummis – "They Can't Take That Away"**; Blindspott – "Phlex"; Scribe – "Stand Up
Songwriter of the Year†	Best Rock Album†
**Scribe, P-Money, Con Psy and Savage – "Not Many"**; Brooke Fraser – "Lifeline"; Greg Johnson – "Save Yourself"	Sponsored by Channel Z: **Dimmer – You've Got to Hear the Music**; Elemeno P – Love & Disrespect; Goodshirt – Fiji Baby
Best Urban/Hip Hop Album†	Best Dance/Electronica Album†
Sponsored by L&P: **Scribe – The Crusader**; King Kapisi – 2nd Round Testament; Mareko – White Sunday	**Salmonella Dub – One Drop East**; Concord Dawn – Uprising; Shapeshifter – Riddim Wise LP
Best Music Video†	People's Choice Award†
Sponsored by C4: **Chris Graham – "Stand Up" (Scribe)**; Gary Sullivan – "Getting What You Give" (Dimmer); Mark Trethewey & Shane Mason – "Fools Love" (Misfits of Science)	Sponsored by Vodafone New Zealand: **Scribe**; Brooke Fraser; Elemeno P; Goodshirt; Steriogram; Zed
Best Producer‡	Best Engineer‡
**P-Money – The Crusader (Scribe)**; Chris Van De Geer & Andrew McLaren – Passenger – (Carly Binding); Murray Fisher – Fiji Baby (Goodshirt); Nic McGowan – The Taming of the Wasps (Paselode); Paddy Free & Tiki Taane – One Drop East (Salmonella Dub)	**Chris Van De Geer – Passenger – (Carly Binding)**; Clint Murphy – You Are Here (Opshop); Dr Lee Prebble – Horsepower (The Phoenix Foundation)
Best Album Cover‡	Best Gospel / Christian Album†
**Ben Sciascia – Postage (Supergroove)**; Kelvin Soh, Simon Oosterdijk & Jay Sandler – You've Got to Hear the Music (Dimmer); Matt Barnes & Aaron McKirdy – Collider (Fur Patrol); Tana Mitchell – Horsepower (The Phoenix Foundation)	**Magnify – In Wonder**; Parachute Band – Glorious; Peter Posa – My Pick
Best Classical Album†	Best Maori Album†
**John Psathas – Psathas: Fragments**; New Zealand String Quartet – Szekely / Dvorak; NZSO – David Farquhar: Three Symphonies	**Ruia – Hawaiki**; Hirini Melbourne, Richard Nunns and Aroha Yates-Smith – Te Hekenga-a-rangi; Whirimako Black – Tangihaku
Best Country Music Album†	Best Country Music Song†
**Donna Dean – Money**	**Donna Dean – "Work It Out"**
Best Folk Album†	Best Pacific Music Album†
**Brendyn Montgomery And Mike Considine – Mountain Air**	**Te Vaka – Tutuki**; Adeaze – Always and for Real; The All Stars – Pele Ea
Best Jazz Album†	International Achievement Award†
**The Rodger Fox Big Band – A Rare Connection**; Charmaine Ford – Blues For Guppy; The Frank Gibson Quartet – Rainbow Bridge	**Hayley Westenra**; Bic Runga; Scribe
Airplay Record of the Year†	Lifetime Achievement Award†
**Goldenhorse – "Maybe Tomorrow"**	**Shaun Joyce**
