= Garage (fanzine) =

Garage was a music fanzine based in Dunedin, New Zealand, which was created and edited by journalist Richard Langston. Six issues were published during the 1980s. The first issue was only 18 photocopied pages and produced in a very small edition, but the final issue was printed in a run of more than a thousand.

Langston had returned to Dunedin in 1984 after living and working in London, and he created Garage out of his enthusiasm for the New Zealand music scene at the time. Garage became a reference especially for the nascent Flying Nun scene which in its early days was based largely around the city's Dunedin Sound music.

Richard Langston is now a director with Country Calendar on TVNZ.

== Distribution ==
Garage was originally distributed only locally in Dunedin, but by the last issue was being distributed and traded in Australia, Great Britain, Europe and the USA.

== Featured artists ==
Artists named on the cover of each issue of Garage were:

1. The Verlaines, The Chills, Tall Dwarfs
2. Sneaky Feelings, The Puddle, The Orange
3. The Builders, The Clean, The Rip, The Chills, Look Blue Go Purple
4. The Doublehappys, the Victor Dimisich Band, The Chills, The Clean, Alex Chilton, Jesus and Mary Chain, The Orange, The Bats, Bird Nest Roys
5. The Enemy, Toy Love, Tall Dwarfs, Goblin Mix, Dr Rock, The Cramps, 13th Floor Elevators, Jesus and Mary Chain
6. The Alpaca Brothers, The Bats, The Clean, The Chills, Fetus Productions, Straitjacket Fits

Notable international acts like Roky Erickson, Lou Reed, and The Go-Betweens were featured in the magazine without being teased on the cover.

== Re-releases ==
As part of the Flying Nun record label’s 30th anniversary celebrations in 2011, all six issues of the Garage were digitally re-released on the Flying Nun blog.

In 2023, HoZac Books published Pull Down the Shades: Garage Fanzine 1984-1986—Tales from the New Zealand Underground, by Richard Langston. The book compiles reproductions of all Garage issues along with modern interviews with many of the musicians profiled in the original zine.
