= Blow (Straitjacket Fits album) =

1983 album from the New Zealand band Straitjacket Fits

Studio album by Straitjacket Fits
- Released: 1993
- Recorded: December 1992 – February 1993
- Studio: American Recording Studios, Woodland Hills; Mixed at Can-Am Studios, Tarzana, California
- Genre: Alternative Rock; Dunedin sound
- Length: 43:32 (NZ release)
- Label: Flying Nun Records (NZ); Arista (US)
- Producer: Paul Fox

Straitjacket Fits chronology
Done (1992)	Blow (1993)	Straitjacket Fits (1998)

Blow is the third album released in 1993 by New Zealand band, Straitjacket Fits. The album has a harder, less melodic sound than the band's previous albums. This reflects the change of line-up, with Andrew Brough having left the band prior to this album's recording, to be replaced by Mark Petersen. It also reflect's the band's change of recording method (for this album the tracks were recorded live) and a change of producer. The album was described by one contemporary reviewer as "...twisted rhythms, see-sawing guitars, and brash intensity... Straitjacket Fits at their least user-friendly and most challenging."

All the songs on this album are credited to Shayne Carter/John Collie/Straitjacket Fits.

Two of the tracks from the album ("Done" and "Spacing") had previously been released in New Zealand on the Done EP in 1992, though both were re-recorded for the album. The American release includes one extra track, "Sycamore", which was released in New Zealand as a B-side of the first single from the album, "Cat Inna Can". The album's other single was "If I Were You".

== Track listing ==
All tracks are written by Shayne Carter/John Collie/Straitjacket Fits.

NZ release
No.	Title	Length
1.	"Done"	3:18
2.	"Falling"	3:35
3.	"Brother's Keeper"	3:24
4.	"Cat Inna Can"	3:52
5.	"Burn It Up"	3:55
6.	"Joyride"	3:28
7.	"Train"	3:43
8.	"Let It Blow"	3:51
9.	"If I Were You"	3:58
10.	"Turn"	3:14
11.	"Way"	3:53
12.	"Spacing"	3:25

US release
No.	Title	Length
1.	"Done"	3:18
2.	"Falling"	3:35
3.	"Joyride"	3:28
4.	"Cat Inna Can"	3:52
5.	"Sycamore"	3:25
6.	"Brother's Keeper"	3:24
7.	"Train"	3:43
8.	"Let It Blow"	3:51
9.	"If I Were You"	3:58
10.	"Turn"	3:14
11.	"Way"	3:53
12.	"Burn It Up"	3:55
13.	"Spacing"	3:25
