= Push Push (band) =

New Zealand rock band

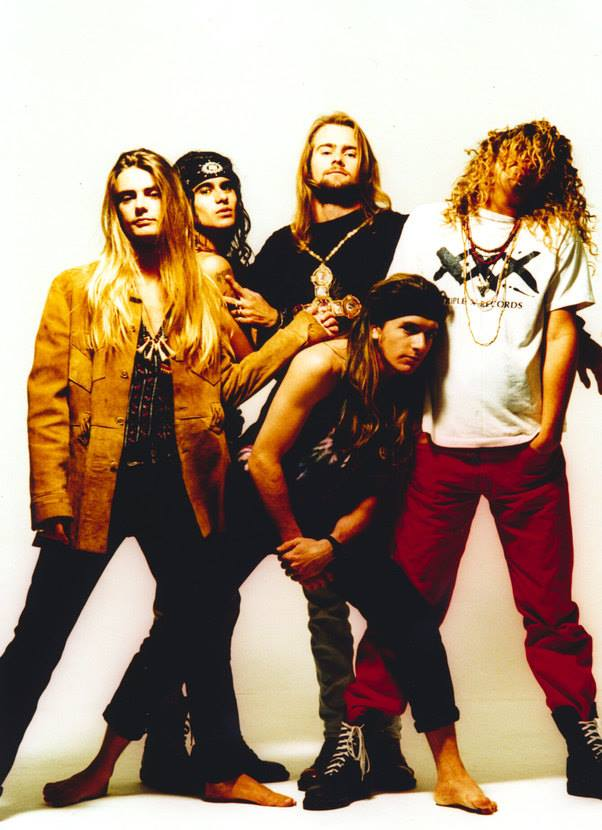
- Push Push in 1992. From Left to Right Scott Cortese, Silver, Steve Abplanalp, Andy Kane, Mikey Havoc

Background information
- Origin: Auckland, New Zealand
- Genres: Rock
- Years active: 1985-1993, 2016-present
- Labels: Tall Poppy; Festival
- Members: Mikey Havoc; Steve Abplanalp; Scott Cortese; Andy Kane; Silver
- Past members: Ken Green
- Website: Push Push Official Facebook Page

Push Push are a rock band formed in the 1990s from Auckland, New Zealand. They are best known for their single "Trippin'".

== History ==
=== Formation and Early Years (1985-86) ===
Former Rangitoto College students Mikey Havoc (vocals), Ken "Kenny" Green (drummer), Andy Kane (aka Andy Wilson, lead guitar), and Steve Abplanalp (bass) formed the band in Auckland around 1985 or 1986. Silver (guitar) then joined, followed by Scott Cortese (drummer, formerly in the band Whiskey and Lace) who replaced Green.

=== A Trillion Shades of Happy (1992) ===
The band released their debut (and only) album A Trillion Shades of Happy in 1992. Their first single "Trippin’" was recorded at Airforce Studios (Auckland), with the drum track being done in one take. The song reached #1 on the New Zealand charts. The bonus track "I Love My Leather Jacket" was recorded at The Lab. Backing vocals on the track 'Dig My World' were provided by Jan Hellriegel. "Song 27" and "What My Baby Likes" were also released from the album, and went on to be further New Zealand Top 10 hits for the band.

=== Opening for AC/DC (1991) ===
The band opened for AC/DC at Mount Smart Stadium for the last performance in the Razors Edge World Tour on Nov 16th 1991. Apparently the band drew straws to see who was going to walk onstage first as there were around 40,000 people in the crowd and they were nervous; Scott Cortese the drummer drew the short straw. Their set ended prematurely, although reasons for this are unclear.

=== Talk2Me EP (2016-17) ===
In February 2016, Steve Abplanalp made a guest appearance on the New Zealand Comedy Gameshow 7 Days (New Zealand TV series), where he made the announcement the band was back together and were set to release a new single as well as play a few shows.

In April 2017, the band released the Talk2Me EP, their first release in 24 years, in conjunction with a music video for the title track. The band also announced a three date tour with British rock band The Darkness.

=== The Truth EP (2025-26) ===
In December 2025, Push Push released "E.P.B (Clutching at the Sky)", a re-worked version of the A Trillion Shades of Happiness song "Euphoric Plunder in Bliss". This marked the band's first new release in eight years.

On February 6th 2026, the band released a new EP, The Truth. The release was followed by a run of live dates to celebrate the bands 35th anniversary.

=== Awards ===
In 1991 Push Push was awarded the top band award and best video award for "Trippin" at the RIANZ awards.

== Discography ==
=== Albums ===
List of albums, with selected details and chart positions
Title	Details	Peak chart positions	
Title	Details	NZ	AUS
A Trillion Shades of Happy	Released: 1992; Label: Tall Poppy Records/Festival Records; Catalogue: C30749	3	105

=== Singles ===
List of singles, with selected chart positions
Title	Year	Peak chart positions		Album
Title	Year	NZ	AUS	Album
"Trippin'"	1991	1	25	A Trillion Shades of Happy
"Song 27"	1991	7	62	A Trillion Shades of Happy
"What My Baby Likes"	1992	4	118	A Trillion Shades of Happy

== Awards ==
RIANZ New Zealand Music Awards
Year	Award	Details	Result
1992	Best Group		Won
1992	Video of the Year	"Trippin'" Mauger Bros	Won
1992	Single of the Year	"Trippin'"	Nominated
1992	Best Male Vocalist	Mikey Havoc	Nominated
