= John Collie =

John Collie may refer to:

- J. Norman Collie (1859–1942), British explorer and scientist
- Sir John Collie (doctor) (1860–1935), British doctor, public servant, and politician
- John Collie (musician) (born c. 1964), New Zealand musician (The DoubleHappys, Straitjacket Fits)
