= Hail (album) =

Studio album by Straitjacket Fits
- Released: 1988 (NZ/UK/US); 1989 (compilation)
- Recorded: June–August 1988
- Studio: The Lab Studios, Auckland
- Genre: Alternative Rock; Dunedin sound
- Length: 35:07 (original NZ release); 51:19 (1989 release)
- Label: Flying Nun Records (NZ); Rough Trade (UK/US)
- Producer: Terry Moore

Straitjacket Fits chronology
Life In One Chord (1987)	Hail (1988)	Melt (1990)

Hail is the first LP album released in 1988 by New Zealand band, Straitjacket Fits. There were three releases of the album, a New Zealand release in 1988, a United Kingdom and United States release also in 1988 and an extended album in 1989. The UK/US release featured tracks which had earlier been released in New Zealand on the Life in One Chord EP; the 1989 release contained all the songs from both the New Zealand album and the earlier EP.

Most of the songs on the album were credited to Shayne Carter/Straitjacket Fits, the exceptions being "Sparkle That Shines", "Take From The Years" and "Fabulous Things" (all Andrew Brough/Straitjacket Fits), and a cover of Leonard Cohen's song "So Long, Marianne". This was the only cover version recorded on any of Straitjacket Fits' albums.

The album was well received, though the band were disappointed that the sound of the finished release failed to capture either their live sound or the intensity of their debut EP. Rip It Up described it as having "tidal waves of sweetly distorted guitar noise that spill over and around the vocal harmonies."

The title track and "Sparkle That Shines" were both released as singles from the album.

== Track listing ==
All tracks are written by Shayne Carter/Straitjacket Fits except where noted.

NZ release
No.	Title	Length
1.	"Telling Tales"	2:53
2.	"Dead Heat"	3:40
3.	"Hail"	4:05
4.	"Only You Knew"	2:56
5.	"Take From The Years" (Andrew Brough/Straitjacket Fits)	3:10
6.	"So Long, Marianne" (Leonard Cohen)	3:59
7.	"Grate"	3:18
8.	"Fabulous Things" (Andrew Brough/Straitjacket Fits)	3:38
9.	"Life In One Chord"	3:10
10.	"This Taste Delight"	4:21

All tracks are written by Shayne Carter/Straitjacket Fits except where noted.

UK/US release
No.	Title	Length
1.	"Dialling A Prayer"	3:53
2.	"All That That Brings"	4:17
3.	"Hail"	4:05
4.	"Sparkle That Shines" (Andrew Brough/Straitjacket Fits)	3:57
5.	"She Speeds"	4:05
6.	"So Long, Marianne" (Leonard Cohen)	3:59
7.	"Grate"	3:18
8.	"Fabulous Things" (Andrew Brough/Straitjacket Fits)	3:38
9.	"Life In One Chord"	3:10
10.	"This Taste Delight"	4:21

All tracks are written by Shayne Carter/Straitjacket Fits except where noted.

1989 compilation
No.	Title	Length
1.	"Dialling A Prayer"	3:53
2.	"Telling Tales"	2:53
3.	"Dead Heat"	3:40
4.	"Hail"	4:05
5.	"Only You Knew"	2:56
6.	"She Speeds"	4:05
7.	"Sparkle That Shines" (Andrew Brough/Straitjacket Fits)	3:57
8.	"Take From The Years" (Andrew Brough/Straitjacket Fits)	3:10
9.	"So Long, Marianne" (Leonard Cohen)	3:59
10.	"Grate"	3:18
11.	"Fabulous Things" (Andrew Brough/Straitjacket Fits)	3:38
12.	"All That That Brings"	4:17
13.	"Life In One Chord"	3:10
14.	"This Taste Delight"	4:21
