= A Trillion Shades of Happy =

Studio album by Push Push
- Released: 1992
- Genre: Rock
- Label: Tall Poppy Records

Singles from A Trillion Shades of Happy
- 1. "Trippin'" Released: March 1991; 2. "Song 27" Released: August 1991; 3. "What My Baby Likes" Released: March 1992

A Trillion Shades of Happy is the only album released by New Zealand rock band Push Push. It was nominated for album of the year in the annual NZ music awards where the band won Band Of The Year.

== Track listing ==
No.	Title	Length
1.	"Beating Up Bullfrogs"	2:56
2.	"What My Baby Likes"	3:22
3.	"Dig My World"	3:55
4.	"Do Ya Love Me?"	4:17
5.	"Two Times"	4:17
6.	"Trippin'"	3:59
7.	"Euphoric Plunder In Bliss"	4:08
8.	"Kiss This"	3:28
9.	"Song 27"	6:47
10.	"2EZ2BDED"	3:19
11.	"I Love My Leather Jacket"	2:32

== Singles ==
"Trippin'" was the first single released and went to No. 1 in New Zealand for six weeks, eventually selling platinum and was the third best-selling single for that year. The band performed this live on the first Hey Hey It's Saturday (Australian entertainment) show broadcast in New Zealand. "Song 27" and "What My Baby Likes" were further New Zealand top ten hits for the band.

== Charts ==
Chart (1992)	Peak position
New Zealand Albums (RMNZ)	3
Australian Albums (ARIA)	105
