= Metamathics =

Studio album by High Dependency Unit
- Released: April 14, 2008
- Genres: Post-rock, psychedelic rock
- Length: 43:11
- Label: Shoot the Freak STF002

High Dependency Unit chronology
Fire Works (2001)	Metamathics (2008)

Professional ratings
Review scores
Source	Rating
NZ Herald	link

Metamathics is the fourth album by the New Zealand post-rock band High Dependency Unit. It was released in New Zealand on April 14, 2008.

== Track listing ==
1. "Stupormodel" – 5:08
2. "Grace" – 4:59
3. "Tunguska" – 7:04
4. "The National Grid" – 13:14
5. "Irma Vep" – 8:43
6. "Wish We Were Here" – 4:03
