= Fools Love =

Single by Misfits of Science

from the album MOS Presents
- Released: 2004
- Genre: Hip hop
- Length: 4:00
- Label: BMG
- Songwriter: Misfits of Science
- Producer: MOS

Misfits of Science - Fools Love (Single)

"Fools Love" is the 2004 debut single from New Zealand hip hop duo Misfits of Science. The song spent four weeks at No.1 on the New Zealand singles chart in August 2004. The music video was nominated for Best Music Video at the 2004 New Zealand Music Awards.

The song samples Doris Day's recording of "Perhaps, Perhaps, Perhaps" and "A Fool in Love" by Ike & Tina Turner.

== Music video ==
The music video was directed by Shane Mason and Mark Trethewey. It is made in an animated style, giving the rap duo comedically oversized heads and surrounding them with hip hop cliches, such as car, cash, and booty girls. The video was nominated for Best Music video at the 2004 New Zealand Music Awards, and also won best video at the 2004 bNet Music Awards and the 2004 Juice TV Awards. The video also prompted the creation of a Special Commendation award for directors Trethewey and Mason at the 2004 Kodak Music Clip Awards.

== Track listing ==
CD

1. "Fools Love" – 4:00
2. "Fools Love Ragga Remix" (Radio Edit) featuring Tuff Enchant
3. "Fools Love" (Instrumental)
4. "Fools Love" (A Capella)

== Charts and certifications ==
Chart (2004)	Peak position
New Zealand (Recorded Music NZ)	1

Region	Certification	Sales/shipments
New Zealand (RMNZ)	2× Platinum	24,000*
*sales figures based on certification alone

== Production credits ==
- Engineer: Shane Mason, Simon Holloway
- Engineer (Assistant): Ben Hudson, Sonna Fegert
- Executive Producer: Adee Keil, Simon Holloway
- Producer: Misfits of Science (MOS)
- Producer (Additional), mixed by, mastered by: Simon Holloway
