= Andrew Brough =

New Zealand musician (1963–2020)

- Born: Andrew Mark Brough; 7 May 1963; Wellington, New Zealand
- Died: 2 February 2020 (aged 56) Dunedin, New Zealand
- Instruments: Guitar, vocals
- Formerly of: Blue Meanies, The Orange, Straitjacket Fits, Bike

Andrew Mark Brough (pronounced /brʌf/; 7 May 1963 – 2 February 2020) was a singer, songwriter and guitarist from Dunedin, New Zealand. Best known for his work with the Straitjacket Fits, he later led the band Bike. In 1996 he was shortlisted for the APRA Silver Scroll and in 2008 he was inducted into the New Zealand Music Hall of Fame.

== Early life ==
Brough was born in Wellington in 1963, the eldest of four children of former missionary Gordon Brough and his wife Catherine. The family moved to Dargaville in the Northland Region when Andrew was about three, and later to Christchurch. Andrew's parents separated in the early 1970s, with Gordon moving south to Dunedin. Andrew joined him around 1974, with his siblings (two boys and a girl) staying in Christchurch, and would attend Logan Park High School.

== The Blue Meanies and The Orange ==
Brough, who had always been a keen singer, began his rock music career as the singer for university student band The Blue Meanies, alongside Martin Kean on bass, Max Satchell on guitar and Richard Allen on drums. They were regular performers at venues like Dunedin's Empire Tavern, but didn't leave behind any studio recordings.

At the time, Brough was influenced by 1960s pop. "I spent three or four years listening to that music after I left school. [...] In the sixties they had a strong sense of melody, which influenced me a lot."

Fruit Salad Lives

EP by The Orange
- Released: 1986
- Recorded: September 1985
- Studios: Strawberry Fields Studio, Dunedin
- Label: Flying Nun Records

Following the demise of The Blue Meanies, Brough formed the Dunedin sound three-piece The Orange with Jonathan Moore (bass, formerly of Bored Games) and Peter Bragan (drums) in 1984. He had "hated just being a frontman", so played guitar as well as singing with The Orange. They played gigs in Dunedin at venues including the Oriental Tavern, where a live recording of the song 'Number One' was made in 1985. It was included in a local compilation tape, Whistle Up A Wind, the next year.

The truth is The Orange are building their own wee solar system of excitement and mood. Riff climbs upon melody, climbs upon rhythm, climbs upon fade-out and then charges back with Bunnymen-ish fervour. Symphonic. Brough's vocal brushstrokes are shaking off initial timidity. He understands the maelstrom that a guitar can be without striving to be an instrumental god. He has the most sympathetic rhythm pals around.

— Review of a gig played by The Orange in May 1985, Dunedin fanzine Garage

Their only studio recording, a five-track EP entitled Fruit Salad Lives, was released by Flying Nun Records shortly before the band broke up in 1986. Writing under the pseudonym 'Buffy O'Reilly', Shayne Carter said that "Brough's airy vocals and melodic, unabrasive guitar lends the five track EP a floating, almost Chilly quality." Later that year, The Orange disbanded when Brough and Carter became bandmates.

== Straitjacket Fits (1986–1991) ==
Brough became better known as guitarist and vocalist alongside Shayne Carter in Straitjacket Fits, a role he held from 1986 (prior to that band's first release) until 1991, when he left the group following the tour to support their second album, Melt.

In his book, Dead People I Have Known, Carter writes that Straitjacket Fits began as a three-piece, with a mutual friend recommending Brough as a fourth member. ″Andrew seemed a good fit for our band, because I really wanted to have harmonies and another singer, like in The Beatles. The first time Andrew stepped on the mic and played his round, Revolver guitar, we knew we'd hit on a sound."

Andrew definitely added a melodic sense to the band, but right from the start really there was this feeling that Andrew's songs were a bit wimpy! However, it did work and created interesting tension in the music.

— John Collie, Straitjacket Fits drummer

Shayne Carter and Andrew Brough were often likened to Lennon and McCartney – a pair of songwriting, guitar-playing bandmates with different styles (one tending towards pop and the other more aggressive), which made for a successful musical collaboration but a difficult personal dynamic. Brough was a regular backing vocalist, his voice providing a contrasting counterpoint to Carter's. In his five years with the band he wrote and sang seven songs.

It worked really well from a record company perspective, having that light and dark with two songwriters. It wasn't just two guitarists, or singers, it was songwriters with different styles which brought another dimension.

— Roger Shepherd, founder, Flying Nun Records

=== Life in One Chord EP (1987) ===
'Sparkle That Shines' was on the band's debut release, the Life in One Chord EP (1987), and also the UK/US version of Hail (1988). Looking back on the song, Brough said "I don't like the singing so much [...] because it's quite pompous and young. [...] I remember in the studio when it was coming together, you could tell that it was going to work." But he liked the band's first recording: "The first EP, I was really proud of. I was thinking, 'Shit, I'm on that! I was part of that', it was good."

=== Hail and touring (1988–1989) ===
'Take From the Years' and 'Fabulous Things' are found on all versions of Hail (the New Zealand version didn't include 'Sparkle That Shines', but the US/UK one did). Brough said that the album "didn't come to fruition musically. It wasn't something I was proud of. [...] I did two songs on that Hail record, and I didn't like either of them very much."

In 1989 Straitjacket Fits toured overseas for the first time, visiting the USA and Europe. "For me it was just a big holiday, to see the world. I was so into American movies and American culture [...] It didn't bother me if we didn't have a good gig or not, we were there, doing it!"

=== Melt (1990) ===
Melt (1990) included 'Down in Splendour', 'Such a Daze', and 'Hand in Mine'. Another Brough song, 'In Spite of it All', was recorded during sessions for Melt and included on the Missing From Melt EP (it was also the b-side of the 'Bad Note For a Heart' single).

I'm glad we did Melt. You know, I'd go straight to Melt as a better example of what we were about [than Hail]. A lot of money spent on it, quite a professional engineer, and a professional studio.

— Andrew Brough

'Down in Splendour' was released as a single (Audioculture calls it "the most radio and record company friendly track on the album") and became Brough's most successful Straitjacket Fits song. In 2001, it was voted 32nd in the APRA Top 100 New Zealand Songs of All Time.

=== Departure (1991) and recognition (2008) ===
Brough's time with Straitjacket Fits ended after the band toured North America in 1991, when he "thought that musically I wasn't achieving what I wanted to achieve".

I was making a compromise for what I really wanted to do musically. And there came a point when I said to myself "y'know, I just want to leave". [...] I wasn't writing enough [songs]. [...] In a band where two people are sharing the songwriting, two people who have got visions of how they want a band to sound, these creative differences create a conflict. [...] The idea of the Straitjacket Fits is to be a good rock n roll band, and to be a good rock n roll band you need some kind of cohesiveness, you need to share the same outlook. It just became increasing [sic] apparent there were too many differences. So on one hand I had to leave because I wanted to pursue my own thing, and on the other hand, for the good of the band, for the good of what Straitjacket Fits wanted to do.

— Andrew Brough, 1993

Their American label, Arista, wanted more Brough songs from the band and Brough himself also wanted to write more. The other three members of the band preferred Carter's heavier numbers. There had been "a good tension" between the two songwriters, but "the last few weeks of that American tour were quite argumentative."

I was allotted two or three songs on an album which just wasn't enough. It was basically unsaid, you know, that I wouldn't be contributing more than 25[%]. It was just this underlying sort of factor, tension almost, that no more was required.

— Andrew Brough on Radio New Zealand, 1998

Carter believed that Brough had stopped committing to the band: "Andrew went off on a really weird trip, and completely dark-manned out. He wasn't trying at gigs, he would actually give up on stage, we'd be playing a show, and look across at this dude who was sitting there. It just became impossible to work together, and it was no fun either." In a 2008 interview, bassist David Wood said that Shayne Carter and Andrew Brough had "no relationship" and "the two did not work closely together".

Brough left Auckland and moved to Dunedin. Mark Peterson replaced him and was a member of Straitjacket Fits until their split in 1994.

While a lot of focus was given to the tension between them, Shayne Carter has written that they also had a lot of common ground. He praised the melody and extra dimension Brough brought to the band, and wrote that Straitjacket Fits "never worked as well" and "became a plainer band" without Brough.

Andrew's role in the band was important. His harmonies, guitar, and pop sensibilities did a lot to shape our group. I liked Andrew. He was smart, cultured in an unpretentious way, with a twisted sense of humour. He was as unforgiving as the rest of us, but he also had the quickest temper – snapping sometimes and barking at the stage crew or others on the periphery. I always found it ironic that his public image was that of the gentle altar boy set upon by the bully Carter.

— Shayne Carter, Dead People I Have Known, 2019

Brough was invited but did not take part in a Straitjacket Fits reunion in 2005. In September 2008 all five band members, including Brough, received the Legacy Award at the New Zealand Music Awards, and were inducted into the New Zealand Music Hall of Fame at the APRA Silver Scroll Awards.

== Bike (1992–1998) ==
After leaving Straitjacket Fits Brough moved to Dunedin, then Auckland. In Dunedin he spent 6 months writing songs, then re-emerged fronting a group known as Tumble before switching the name to Bike (inspired by the 1967 Pink Floyd song of the same name). Brough's new band played their first show in Dunedin in October 1992, supporting The Verlaines.

In Auckland he put together Bike's first acknowledged line-up, finding drummer Karl Buckley through an advertisement, then recruiting bassist Tristan Mason through a family connection of Buckley's. (Buckley was later replaced by Wayne Bell, then Bevan Sweeney).

Bike was deliberately designed as a vehicle for Brough's songs. After being a minority contributor to Straitjacket Fits he wanted to "be in charge of a band where I have to write music". Brough described Bike's sound as "powerful pop songs", while others used descriptions like "soothing, cheerful and sunny". Dave Eggleton, in Ready To Fly, said "Bike's sound was a homage to 1960's psychedalia".

You take a song, and you've got three-and-a-half minutes. And the idea of that song is you blow people away...you're obviously not going to blow everyone away, but hopefully the response is "wow, this is making me feel really good." I'm trying to write songs that people will enjoy.

— Andrew Brough, 1993

Take in the Sun

Studio album by Bike
- Released: 1997
- Recorded: Summer 1996/97 (except tracks 7 and 10 – recorded summer 1995/96)
- Studios: York Street Studios, Auckland
- Labels: Flying Nun Records, Mushroom Records
- Producers: Andrew Brough, Malcolm Welsford

Bike first toured New Zealand in 1994, having already been offered an album deal by Flying Nun but not yet released any music. Their first song to be released was "My Love, My Life", on 1995 ABBA tribute album Abbasalutely. Brough described the song as, "drippy - yes but with a worthy enough hook to throw some guitars at."

Bike released a self-titled EP in 1996: the song 'Save My Life', was a songwriting finalist at the 1996 APRA Silver Scrolls, and Bike was nominated as 'most promising new band' at the New Zealand Music Awards.

=== Take in the Sun ===
'Save My Life' was followed up with the single 'Circus Kids' in 1997, and a debut record, Take in the Sun, later that year.

Through the previous years of writing, rehearsing and touring, Brough had a clear template for the album before recording began. "The fact that most of the songs were demoed to death in the proceeding couple of years, meant that going into the studio, I had it fairly well worked out what it was going to sound like in the end, just through a lot of four-track demoing."

While the album was funded by Mushroom Records, like all of Bike's material it was released by Flying Nun Records. The American version of the album, part of the March Records catalogue, had a slightly altered cover with different typography.

Take in the Sun made the New Zealand album charts, at number 47, in October 1997. The band toured New Zealand and overseas to support the release, while Brough was featured on the covers of magazines including Pavement and Real Groove. Increased media attention, including a large photo in a Sunday newspaper, led Brough to worry about being "recognised in the street".

The video for Welcome to My World featured Shayne Carter, Brough's old Straitjacket Fits bandmate, as a policeman. Along with the Circus Kids video, it was directed by Jonathan King. The Save My Life video was directed by Mark Tierney.

Bike's music was sometimes heard in the background of television soaps including Australia's Home and Away. This was believed to be main source of Brough's music-related income. As long-time broadcaster Jonathan Alley of RRR recounts, "After a Bike song was licensed for use on television, it created [for] Andrew a bit of windfall and with that money he brought a house."

=== Andy Dandy (2000) ===
The last Andrew Brough song to be released was a version of James K. Baxter's poem Andy Dandy. It was made especially for the 2000 album Baxter. Brough's was one of 12 contributions to the project, which was conceived and managed by musician Charlotte Yates. While he was happy to accept her invitation to be a part of recording the album 'Baxter', he chose not to appear at the accompanying concert. Music critic Graham Reid said that "Andrew Brough has taken one of Baxter's children's poems and turned it into an archetypical dreamscape of layered guitars."

== Death ==
Brough died in Dunedin on 2 February 2020. Public reports of his death were first made two days later, on 4 February. He was 56 years old.

== Awards ==
=== Aotearoa Music Awards ===
The Aotearoa Music Awards (previously known as New Zealand Music Awards (NZMA)) are an annual awards night celebrating excellence in New Zealand music and have been presented annually since 1965.

Year	Nominee / work	Award	Result	Ref.
2008	Andrew Brough (as part of Straitjacket Fits)	New Zealand Music Hall of Fame	inductee	
