= Fire Works =

Studio album by High Dependency Unit
- Released: March 2001
- Recorded: Steve Albini's studio, Chicago
- Genres: Post-rock, psychedelic rock
- Length: 43:45
- Label: Flying Nun Records FNCD450
- Producer: Dale Cotton

High Dependency Unit chronology
Crosschannel Multitap (1998)	Fire Works (2001)	Metamathics (2008)

Fire Works is the third album by the New Zealand post-rock band High Dependency Unit. It was released in New Zealand in March 2001. HDU had supported Steve Albini's band Shellac on a tour of New Zealand, and the album was recorded at Albini's studio in Chicago, but with Albini otherwise engaged production was handled by Dale Cotton.

The album received a four-star rating from Allmusic, who were most impressed by the slower tracks.

== Track listing ==
1. "Visionson" – 2:09
2. "Joyd" – 4:30
3. "The 3 Second Rule" – 5:04
4. "Giant Overpasses" – 6:20
5. "Sarsparilla" – 4:32
6. "Schallblüte" – 3:42
7. "Now Here" – 6:45
8. "Parfum" – 4:23
9. "Concentricity" – 6:20
