= MOS Presents =

Studio album by Misfits of Science
- Released: 2004
- Recorded: 2004
- Studio: Beaver Studios, Auckland, NZ
- Genre: Rap
- Length: 52:09
- Label: Sony BMG, Hoof Records
- Producer: MOS – Misfits of Science

Misfits of Science chronology
MOS Presents (2004)	Can't Leave You Alone – EP (2008)

MOS Presents is the debut album by New Zealand hip-hop group, Misfits of Science, released in 2004.

This album made its way into the NZ top charts on 11 November 2004, in the 28th position. Peaking at 19th, this album held its spot in the Top-40, its last day on said chart being 3 January 2005, with the 40th position on the chart.

There are music videos to several tracks on this release, including "Chemical Madness", "Fools Love", and "Mmmhmm".

== Track listing ==
No.	Title	Length
1.	Look at 'Em	1:59
2.	Chemical Madness	3:07
3.	Fools Love	4:01
4.	Kiddie Fiddlin'	5:07
5.	La Musica (featuring Tuff Enchant)	3:41
6.	Ain't Nobody	3:56
7.	Catch Up	2:50
8.	Attack of the Dickriders	3:06
9.	Three Days of the Blender (featuring AL)	2:10
10.	Mmmhmm	4:29
11.	Trailblazers	3:25
12.	Lump It	3:11
13.	Horror Flick	3:34
14.	The Remarkables	3:11
15.	Hater Nation (featuring Chong Nee)	4:22
Total Length		52:09

== Charts ==
Chart (2004)	Peak position
Official New Zealand Music Chart	19
