= Trippin' (Push Push song) =

Single by Push Push

from the album A Trillion Shades of Happy
- B-side: "Blondes"
- Released: 1991
- Studio: Airforce (Auckland, New Zealand)
- Genre: Rock
- Length: 4:02
- Label: Tall Poppy; Festival NZ
- Songwriter(s): Steve Abplanalp; Andy Kane; Mikey Havoc; Push Push
- Producer(s): Tim Foreman; Andy Kane

Push Push singles chronology
"Trippin'" (1991)	"Song 27" (1991)

Music video
- "Trippin'" at NZ on Screen

"Trippin'" is the debut single of New Zealand rock band Push Push. The song was also recorded around the same time by Auckland punk stalwarts "The Warners" (1984–1995) and appeared on the Crazy Horses single released by Wildside Records. "Trippin'" reached number one in New Zealand for six weeks and peaked at number 25 in Australia.

== Music video ==
The music video is a performance video directed by Chris Mauger. It won Best Music Video at the 1992 New Zealand Music Awards.

== Awards ==
RIANZ New Zealand Music Awards
Year	Award	Details	Result
1992	Best Video	Chris & Tim Mauger	Won
1992	Single of the Year		Nominated

== Charts ==
=== Weekly charts ===
Chart (1991)	Peak position
Australia (ARIA)	25
New Zealand (Recorded Music NZ)	1

=== Year-end charts ===
Chart (1991)	Position
New Zealand (RIANZ)	3

== Certifications ==
Region	Certification	Certified units/sales
New Zealand (RMNZ)	Platinum	10,000^{*}
^{*} Sales figures based on certification alone.

== Cover versions ==
In 1999, New Zealand electronic act Baitercell released a techno version featuring American-Australian performer Miz Ima Starr. The song later appeared in the film I'll Make You Happy and its soundtrack CD which was released by Flying Nun Records.
