= She Speeds =

Song performed by Straitjacket Fits

Single by Straitjacket Fits

from the album Life in One Chord (EP)
- Released: 1987
- Recorded: Lab Studios, Auckland
- Genre: Alternative Rock, Dunedin sound
- Label: Flying Nun Records
- Songwriter: Shayne Carter /Straitjacket Fits

Music video
- "She Speeds" at NZ on Screen

She Speeds is a song by the Dunedin, New Zealand band Straitjacket Fits. The song was released on their debut 'Life in One Chord EP' in 1987. The EP was recorded at the Lab Studios in Auckland, New Zealand, and reached number 10 on the NZ Top 40 charts later that year. A video was filmed for She Speeds for just $250 by Johnny Ogilvy and the song quickly became a cornerstone of their live sets. The song would later be dropped from their sets as the band moved away from its early sound.

"She Speeds" was the last song played by the band at the Auckland Big Day Out in 1994. The band went on a semi-permanent hiatus after this show. At a show during their 2005 reunion tour, Shayne Carter humorously murmured 'Uh-oh suppose this had to happen' before launching into the opening riff of the song.

"She Speeds" is number 9 on the APRA Top 100 New Zealand Songs of All Time as voted by APRA members.

Drummer John Collie said in 2008 that after listening to a live recording of their 2005 reunion tour, "She Speeds" along with "Dialling a Prayer" were still the best songs the band recorded during their career.
