= Jan Hellriegel =

- Jan Hellriegel, live at St James Theatre, Wellington

Background information
- Born: Janette Hellriegel; Waitakere, Auckland, New Zealand
- Origin: Auckland, New Zealand
- Genre: Pop/rock
- Occupation: Singer-songwriter
- Instruments: Vocals, guitar, piano
- Years active: 1985–present
- Labels: Warner Music, Blind Date Records
- Website: Jan Hellriegel

Jan Hellriegel is a singer/songwriter based in Auckland, New Zealand.

Her first recorded appearances were with Dunedin band Working With Walt in the mid-1980s when she studied at the University of Otago in Dunedin. She then formed all-woman band Cassandra's Ears, moving back to Auckland and going solo in the early 90s.

Hellriegel has released four solo studio albums, It's My Sin 1992, Tremble 1995, All Grown Up 2009, and Sportsman of the Year in 2019.

== History ==
=== Early ===
Hellriegel was born and raised in West Auckland with her three brothers and attended Henderson High School. She famously worked in her father's panel beating shop, though only in the office. Nonetheless, the combination of her birthplace and early employment led to her being branded a "Westie" by the New Zealand media.

Hellriegel took vocal training in speech and singing at St Mary's College, Auckland under Sister Mary Leo. She then moved to Dunedin in the 1980s to attend the University of Otago, where she graduated with a Bachelor of Arts.

While in Dunedin, she joined her brother Rob Hellriegel's band, Working With Walt. She performed backing vocals, piano and guitar on their 1984 7" LP The Prophet and wrote and performed the song "Christina" on the band’s 1985 LP 4 Sides.

In 1988, Hellriegel performed backing vocals on the Leonard Cohen song "So Long Marianne", performed by Straitjacket Fits.

=== Cassandra’s Ears ===
In the late 1980s Hellriegel formed the band Cassandra's Ears with Dunedin bandmates Flick Rhind (bass), Zan Wright (backing vocals), Vanessa Anich (drums) and Leanne Ibell (guitar). She wrote music and lyrics and performed vocals, guitar and keyboards.

Their first release was the song "Replacements" for the National Student Radio 1986 compilation, Weird Culture Weird Custom. The band played local gigs, toured New Zealand, wrote more material, and eventually released two EPs, Private Wasteland in 1988 and Your Estimation in 1990.

Cassandra's Ears reformed in November 2010 for a one-off show in Auckland to support the release of The Cassandra's Ears Story.

=== Solo career ===
Hellriegel signed with Warner Records New Zealand in 1990. Her first album, It’s My Sin, was recorded between December 1991 and January 1992. Her second album, Tremble, was recorded at Sing Sing in Melbourne and Studios 301 in Sydney in 1995. In 1996 she was awarded Most Promising Female Vocalist at the New Zealand Music Awards, and Top Female Vocalist and Single of the Year (for Manic) at the Music and Entertainer Awards of New Zealand. She left Warner Brothers

Hellriegel subsequently parted ways with Warner Records, and her single "Melusine", recorded at Beaver Studios (Auckland), was released by Universal Records in 1998.

In 1999, she joined the Alan Duff Charitable Foundation Duffy Books in Homes programme as a celebrity spokesperson. She co-wrote the theme song "Read About It" with Dave Dobbyn and Toi Iti. During that year she played a non-musical acting role on Shortland Street, playing Jackie, an abused wife.

In 2000, she appeared in the New Zealand television show Street Legal and in 2001 she became involved in a collaboration with Tom Blaxland called Project Runway. In 2002, she wrote and recorded the song "Star Baby" for children’s clothing label Pumpkin Patch.

In early 2009 Hellriegel went into Roundhead Studios in Auckland to record a third album with a line-up of musicians including producer Wayne Bell, Nick Gaffaney on drums, Brett Adams and Ben Fulton on guitar, Eddie Rayner and Michael Larsen on piano/keyboards, and Mark Hughes on bass. All Grown Up was released on her own record label, Blind Date Records, in October 2009. The album "Lost Songs" was released in April 2013. The album is a collection of previously unreleased material – demos, live sessions and studio work from 1990–2000 which Hellriegel had remastered from DAT and cassette recordings.

Hellriegel announced and released a new multi-media project through April and May 2019. "Sportsman of the Year" was composed of a studio album and book of the same name, and was also serialised as podcasts, produced by Radio New Zealand and presented by Hellriegel.

=== Business career ===
Hellriegel was appointed NZ General Manager of Australia-based Native Tongue Music Publishing in 2010 and ran the company’s NZ operations until 2013 when she left to develop Aeroplane Music Services, a music licensing and supervision business.

In 2015 Hellriegel announced Songbroker, an "artist-friendly" music publishing company focused on providing music by NZ songwriters to film, TV and content producers Songbroker represents the musical rights and recorded works of several hundred NZ composers and songwriters.

== Discography ==
=== Albums ===
Year	Title	Details	Peak chart positions
Year	Title	Details	NZ
1992	It's My Sin	Label: Warner; Catalogue: 90317 77192	5
1995	Tremble	Rereleased: 2010; Label: Warner / Blind Date Records; Catalogue: 4509995722	15
2009	All Grown Up	Released: 18 October 2009; Rereleased: 2010; Label: Blind Date Records	38
2013	Lost Songs	Released: 17 May 2013; Label: Blind Date Records	40
2019	Sportsman of the Year	Released: 10 May 2019; Label: Blind Date Records	8

=== With Cassandra's Ears ===
- The Cassandra's Ears Story (2010)

=== Singles ===
Year	Title	Peak chart positions	Album
Year	Title	NZ	Album
1992	"The Way I Feel"	4	It's My Sin
1992	"It’s My Sin"	—	It's My Sin
1993	"No Idea"	17	It's My Sin
1993	"Westy Gals" (Radio release only)	—	It's My Sin
1994	"Wings of Steel (Radio Edit)" (Radio release only)	—	It's My Sin
1995	"Manic (Is A State of Mind)"	5	Tremble
1995	"Geraldine"	34	Tremble
1996	"Pure Pleasure"	—	Tremble
1997	"Sentimental Fool"	35	Non-album single
1998	"Melusine"	17	Non-album single
2010	"Melusine" (Rerelease)	—	Non-album single
2010	"Sentimental Fool"	—	Non-album single
2013	"Venus Is Dead"	—	Non-album single
2014	"Bottom of My Heart"	—	Non-album single
2014	"Because You"	—	Non-album single
2015	"For The Love of Glory"	—	Non-album single
"—" denotes a recording that did not chart or was not released in that territory.
