= Life in One Chord =

EP by Straitjacket Fits
- Released: 1987
- Recorded: The Lab Studios, Auckland, April 1987
- Genre: Alternative Rock, Dunedin sound
- Length: 16:12
- Label: Flying Nun Records
- Producer: Terry Moore

Straitjacket Fits chronology
Life in One Chord (1987)	Hail (1988)

Life in One Chord is an EP by New Zealand band Straitjacket Fits, released in 1987. It was the band's debut release. All of the tracks from the EP were included as part of an extended version of their first full album, Hail. The songs are credited to Shayne Carter/Straitjacket Fits except for "Sparkle That Shines" (Andrew Brough/Straitjacket Fits). "Sparkle That Shines" was released as a single in 1989.

The EP spent 10 weeks on the New Zealand charts.

== Production ==
The EP, produced by Terry Moore, was recorded at The Lab, in Auckland, New Zealand.

== Critical reception ==
Trouser Press wrote that the EP "occasionally trips over its own ambition but dazzles on the wild 'Dialing a Prayer'." Melody Maker called the EP "one psychotic straitlaced feline mutha of a record." In a retrospective article, the Sunday Star-Times wrote: "Right from the first note of their first EP, Life in One Chord (1987), Shayne Carter made up his own world, a personalised gothic opera, with Carter playing the rebel rock star in the grand, sneering tradition of early Elvis, John Lennon and Sid Vicious."

== Track listing ==
All tracks are written by Shayne Carter/Straitjacket Fits except where noted

No.	Title	Length
1.	"Dialling A Prayer"	3:53
2.	"She Speeds"	4:05
3.	"Sparkle That Shines" (Andrew Brough/Straitjacket Fits)	3:57
4.	"All That That Brings"	4:17
