= Misfits of Science (group) =

New Zealand hip-hop group

- Also known as: MOS
- Origin: New Zealand
- Genre: Rap
- Instruments: Keys, Synths, Drums
- Years active: 2004–2008, 2018
- Labels: Sony BMG, Hoof Records, Independent
- Members: Yudhi Moodley – "Colossal", Steve McQuinn – "Optimus"
- Website: www.youtube.com/@ItstheMisfits

Misfits of Science are a New Zealand hip-hop group that formed in 2000.

The group consists of South African born Yudhi Moodley - Ruckus Garvey and Kiwi native Stephen McQuinn. After meeting at a clothing store in 2000, they spent the next few years crafting their production and writing skills, and would eventually form Misfits of Science.

Shortly after the completion of their demo tape and being awarded a recording grant by NZ On Air in 2002 for their initial single - Fools Love, Moodley and McQuinn signed to indie record label Hoof with a distribution deal under Sony BMG.

Colossal & Optimus

The video for Fools Love was released on music channel C4 in April 2004, and became one of the most successful charting NZ singles ever, spending four consecutive weeks at #1, 18 weeks in the top 10, and 32 weeks in total in the top 40, going multi platinum in the process. Their debut album MOS Presents was released in November 2004, achieving gold status.

The Can't Leave You Alone EP would be the last material released under Hoof due to an irreconcilable breach of contract by the label. Funny Money and The Hype were their last ever recorded tracks.

== History ==
The two members met in an urban streetwear shop on Queen Street in Auckland, New Zealand in 2000. As well as 'MOS Presents...', they released the 'Fools Love (Ragga Remix)', a remix to 'Fools Love' featuring Tuff Enchant with its own video. They were also featured on the soundtrack to PSP/PS3 title Gripshift contributing the title track 'Shift' specifically made for the game, 5 songs from 'MOS Presents...', including 'Fools Love', 'Catch Up', 'Mmmhmm', and also 'Fools Love (Ragga Remix)'.

The group made a brief return in early 2018, releasing two more singles, The Hype, and Funny Money, however neither of these charted.

After releasing Funny Money, the group separated.

One of their last tracks, Light You Up, was released on all digital platforms in late 2019.

Yudhi, aka "Colossal", has also been releasing music under the alias Ruckus Garvey.

== Discography ==
=== Albums ===
Year	Title	Details	Peak chart positions
Year	Title	Details	NZ
2004	MOS Presents	Label: Sony BMG, Hoof Records; Catalogue: 82876662262	19 (Gold)
2005	The Lost & Found J.U.L Files	Label: Independent	
2008	Can't Leave You Alone – EP	Label: Hoof Records	—
"—" denotes a recording that did not chart or was not released in that territory.

=== Singles ===
Year	Title	Peak chart positions	Album
Year	Title	NZ	Album
2004	"Fools Love"	1 (2× Platinum)	MOS Presents
2004	"Mmmhmm"	—	MOS Presents
2004	"Chemical Madness"	—	MOS Presents
2008	"Can't Leave You Alone"	—	Can't Leave You Alone EP
2008	"Mama I'm A Misfit"	—	Can't Leave You Alone EP
2008	"Bang"	—	Can't Leave You Alone EP
2018	"The Hype"	—	N/A
2018	"Funny Money"	—	N/A
2019	"Light You Up"	—	The Lost & Found J.U.L Files
"—" denotes a recording that did not chart or was not released in that territory.
