= Real Groove (magazine) =

- Categories: Music magazine
- Frequency: Monthly
- Publisher: Tangible Media
- Founded: 1993
- Final issue: October 2010
- Country: New Zealand
- Based in: Auckland
- Language: English
- Website: realgroove.co.nz

Real Groove was a New Zealand monthly music and pop culture magazine that operated from 1993 to 2010.

== History ==
Based in Auckland, Real Groove began in 1993 as a free newsletter distributed through Real Groovy Records. It became a newsstand title in the late 1990s and was subsequently owned by Tangible Media.

In 2003, a survey by Nielsen Media Research showed a monthly readership comparable to Rip It Up, New Zealand's leading music magazine.

The 196th and final issue of Real Groove, dated October 2010, featured Leonard Cohen on the cover. The magazine had tried to focus on its online presence and, according to Wicks, the closure was due to "the lack of demand for physical publications". Among local media, its demise coincided with that of Pulp magazine, MTV's withdrawal from New Zealand, and Back2Basics merging with Rip It Up.

Real Groove was amalgamated into The Groove Guide, a free weekly magazine owned by Tangible Media. That title was similarly closed down, in May 2011.

== People ==
Real Groove was first edited by music historian John Dix, author of Stranded in Paradise: New Zealand Rock'n'Roll, 1955–1988. Subsequent editors included Nick Bollinger, John Russell, Brock Oliver, Duncan Greive, and Sam Wicks.

Among the other writers whose work appeared in the magazine are Adrian Osman, Chris Bourke, Gary Steel, Graham Reid, former Creem music critic Richard Riegel, and Russell Brown.
