= High Dependency Unit (band) =

New Zealand psychedelic rock band

- Also known as: HDU
- Origin: Dunedin, New Zealand
- Genres: Post-rock, psychedelic rock
- Years active: 1994-present (hiatus)
- Labels: Flying Nun, Furtherist, Shoot the Freak
- Members: Tristan Dingemans; Neil Phillips; Constantine Karlis
- Website: www.hdu.co.nz

High Dependency Unit are a New Zealand psychedelic rock band originating from Dunedin. Forming in 1994, the band was described by BBC DJ and presenter John Peel as "one of the 10 best bands in the world you've never heard of." The band consists of Tristan Dingemans (guitar, vocals), Neil Phillips (guitar, bass) and Constantine Karlis (drums, percussion, synth, samples).

== History ==
The band opened for bands including Mogwai and Shellac.

Prominent audio engineer and longtime fan Steve Albini hosted HDU at his Chicago studio for their 2001 release Fire Works.

== Discography ==
=== Albums ===
- Sum of the Few (1996)
- Crosschannel Multitap (1998)
- Fire Works (2001)
- Metamathics (2008)

=== EPs ===
- Abstinence:Acrimony (1995)
- Higher (1997)
- Memento Mori (2000)
