= John Collie (musician) =

John Collie (born Dunedin, New Zealand, circa 1964) is the former drummer for New Zealand band Straitjacket Fits. Collie was previously a member of Doublehappys with Shayne Carter, a band which he had joined in 1984. Collie also drummed for ephemeral Dunedin "super-group" The Weeds on their one-off 1985 single "Wheatfields".

Collie has retreated from the music scene since the end of the Fits, and is now a full-time photographer.

== Awards ==
=== Aotearoa Music Awards ===
The Aotearoa Music Awards (previously known as New Zealand Music Awards (NZMA)) are an annual awards night celebrating excellence in New Zealand music and have been presented annually since 1965.

Year	Nominee / work	Award	Result	Ref.
2008	John Collie (as part of Straitjacket Fits)	New Zealand Music Hall of Fame	inductee	

== Sources ==
- Davey, T. & Puschmann, H. (1996) Kiwi rock. Dunedin: Kiwi Rock Publications. ISBN 0-473-03718-1.
- Dix, J. (1988) Stranded in paradise: New Zealand rock'n'roll 1955-1988. Wellington: Paradise Publications. ISBN 0-473-00638-3.
- Eggleton, D. (2003) Ready to fly: The story of New Zealand rock music. Nelson, NZ: Craig Potton Publishing. ISBN 1-877333-06-9.
