= You've Got to Hear the Music =

Studio album by Dimmer
- Released: 2004
- Label: Mushroom Records/Flying Nun Records

Dimmer chronology
I Believe You Are a Star (2001)	You've Got to Hear the Music (2004)	There My Dear (2006)

You've Got to Hear the Music is the second album by New Zealand band Dimmer. It was released in 2004, and came with a bonus disc which featured the same songs but in live and acoustic versions.

At the 2004 New Zealand Music Awards You've Got To Hear The Music won Best Rock Album, and Dimmer was named the Best Group. Dimmer was also nominated for Album of the Year, Single of the Year ('Getting What You Give'), Best Cover Art, and Best Music Video. The album received Gold certification in New Zealand.

== Track listing ==
=== Disc one ===
1. "Come Here"
2. "Backwards Is Backwards"
3. "Getting What You Give"
4. "Only One that Matters"
5. "Case"
6. "Lucky One"
7. "Happening"
8. "Searching Time"
9. "Reach Away"
10. "Concentration"
11. "Finality"
