= The DoubleHappys =

New Zealand rock band

DoubleHappys
- Origin: Dunedin, New Zealand
- Genres: Rock
- Years active: 1983–1986
- Labels: Flying Nun
- Past members: Shayne Carter; Wayne Elsey; John Collie

The DoubleHappys (sometimes spelled Double Happys) were a New Zealand rock band based in Dunedin who had a short-lived but influential career and were part of the Dunedin sound music wave of the 1980s.

== History ==
The band was formed initially by former Bored Games members Shayne Carter and Wayne Elsey after the demise of Elsey's other band The Stones in 1983.

They employed an old and erratic drum machine (dubbed "Herbie Fuckface"). Herbie proved too erratic and it was not long before the duo opted to recruit former school friend John Collie to provide a more reliable rhythm section. They took part in the Flying Nun "Looney Tour" in February 1984, travelling around the country with various other bands, cutting a single, the "Double B-side" ("The Other's Way" and "Anyone Else Would"), in March.

Early in 1985, the band recorded an EP, Cut it Out and embarked on a short tour in June. Towards the end of the tour the band were travelling south from Auckland by train when Elsey, in high spirits, climbed out of a carriage. The train passed under a bridge, killing Elsey instantly.

The two remaining members of the band decided not to continue with the name, but later formed the nucleus of Straitjacket Fits.

A compilation CD Nerves which features the single, EP, and live tracks, was released in 1992.

"The Other's Way" was covered by Australian band The Glory Box on their 1991 album Fudgeland.

== Discography ==
=== Singles & EPs ===
- Double B Side (7" – 1984 – Flying Nun Records – FN026) #42
- Cut It Out (12" – 1985 – Flying Nun Records – FNDH002) #33
- How Much Time Left, Please? (12" – 1990 – Avalanche Records – ONLY MLP 012 – Recorded in 1984)

=== Compilations ===
- Nerves (7" – 1992 – Flying Nun Records – FNCD196)
