= Working with Walt =

Working With Walt
- Performing in Dunedin, 1986. L-R: Rob Hellriegel, Jan Hellriegel, Mark Petersen, David Wood (Kevin Fielden obscured)

Background information
- Origin: Dunedin, New Zealand
- Years active: 1983–1987
- Labels: Jayrem
- Past members: Rob Hellriegel; Jan Hellriegel; Mark Petersen; David Wood; Kevin Fielden

Working With Walt was a music group formed in the 1980s, and based in Dunedin, New Zealand.

Working With Walt disbanded sometime by the late 1980s with Jan Hellriegel going on to a solo music career, and David Wood helping form Straitjacket Fits.

== Band members ==
- Rob Hellriegel (guitar, vocals and backing vocals)
- Jan Hellriegel (piano, vocals and backing vocals)
- Mark Petersen (guitar and backing vocals)
- David Wood (bass guitar)
- Neil Moorhouse (drums).

== Discography ==
Date of Release	Title	Label	Charted	Certification	Catalog Number
Singles 12"
1984	Working With Walt	Jayrem	-	-	JAY 124
1986	Five Sides	Jayrem	-	-	JAY 135
