= Mikey Havoc =

New Zealand broadcaster (born 1970)

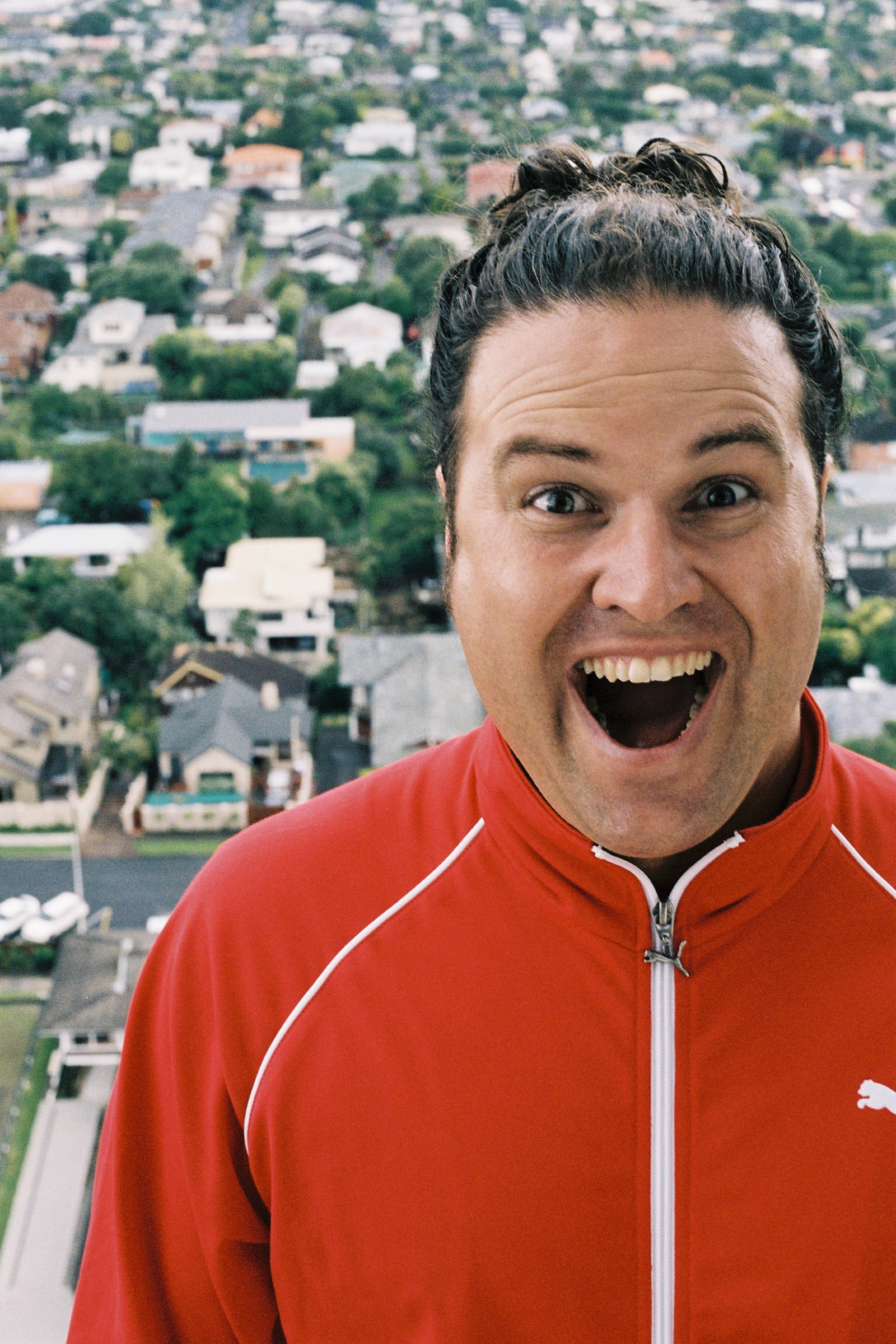
- Havoc in 2009
- Born: Michael Alexander Roberts c. 1970 (age 55–56); New Zealand
- Occupations: Singer; musician; songwriter; media personality
- Years active: 1985–present
- Spouse: Claire Chitham (m. 2006; div. 2009)
- Partner: Georgia Cubbon
- Children: 1
- Musical career
- Genres: Rock; alternative rock; EDM
- Member of: Push Push
- Presenting career
- Stations: formerly host on bFM and Radio Hauraki

Michael Alexander Roberts (born c. 1970), known professionally as Mike Havoc or simply Havoc, is a New Zealand singer, musician, and media personality who is the lead singer of the rock band Push Push. He was also a DJ for 95bFM for nearly 25 years over three periods, with the most recent being from 2017 to 2019.

== Radio ==
Roberts first became a DJ on the University of Auckland's 95bFM radio station in the early 1990s. He was on the breakfast show from 1996 to 2002, winning Best New Broadcaster at the 1997 New Zealand Radio Awards and later moved to the afternoon-evening "Drive" show. He once again took over as the breakfast show host on 4 September 2006, after previous host Wallace Chapman quit to pre-empt a suspected layoff. On 3 May 2010 Havoc returned to his Drive slot as Matt Heath took over the breakfast show. Havoc left the show on 3 December 2010. He returned to radio in 2012 on mainstream rock station Hauraki weeknights 7-10pm. Havoc returned to 95bFM from 8 May 2017 to 3 May 2019 for a third stint as breakfast show host.

== Music ==
Mikey Havoc is the lead singer of the New Zealand rock band Push Push, best known for its 1991 number one singles 'What My Baby Likes' and 'Trippin''. During the late 1990s he owned and managed The Squid nightclub in inner-city Auckland.

== TV ==
In the mid-nineties he moved into television on New Zealand's short lived MTV channel with the 30 minute live weekday night magazine style show Havoc with his 95bFM co-worker Jeremy Wells. This show moved to TV 2 in an hour-long weekly format when MTV closed down. He continued on TVNZ with the shows Havoc and Newsboy's Sell-out Tour and Havoc's Luxury Suites and Conference Facilities. During the Tour in 1999, he labelled Gore the gay capital of New Zealand – the mayor of Gore was quoted in the news saying Havoc would be run out of town if he ever returned. In 2002 Havoc was nominated for Best Presenter for Havoc Luxury Suites and Conference Facility in the TV Guide New Zealand Television Awards.

In 2004 he moved to TV3 with Havoc Presents Quality Time.

== Personal life ==
In early 2006, Havoc married New Zealand actress Claire Chitham of Shortland Street fame. They split in 2009.

By 2009, he had more than $20,000 in traffic fines, which he chose to repay by doing community work – initially as a DJ outside the Auckland University Students' Association, until cancelled by the Department of Corrections.

In April 2016 Mikey and partner Georgia Cubbon had a son, named Kyuss.

== See also ==
- List of New Zealand television personalities
