= Shayne Carter =

New Zealand musician

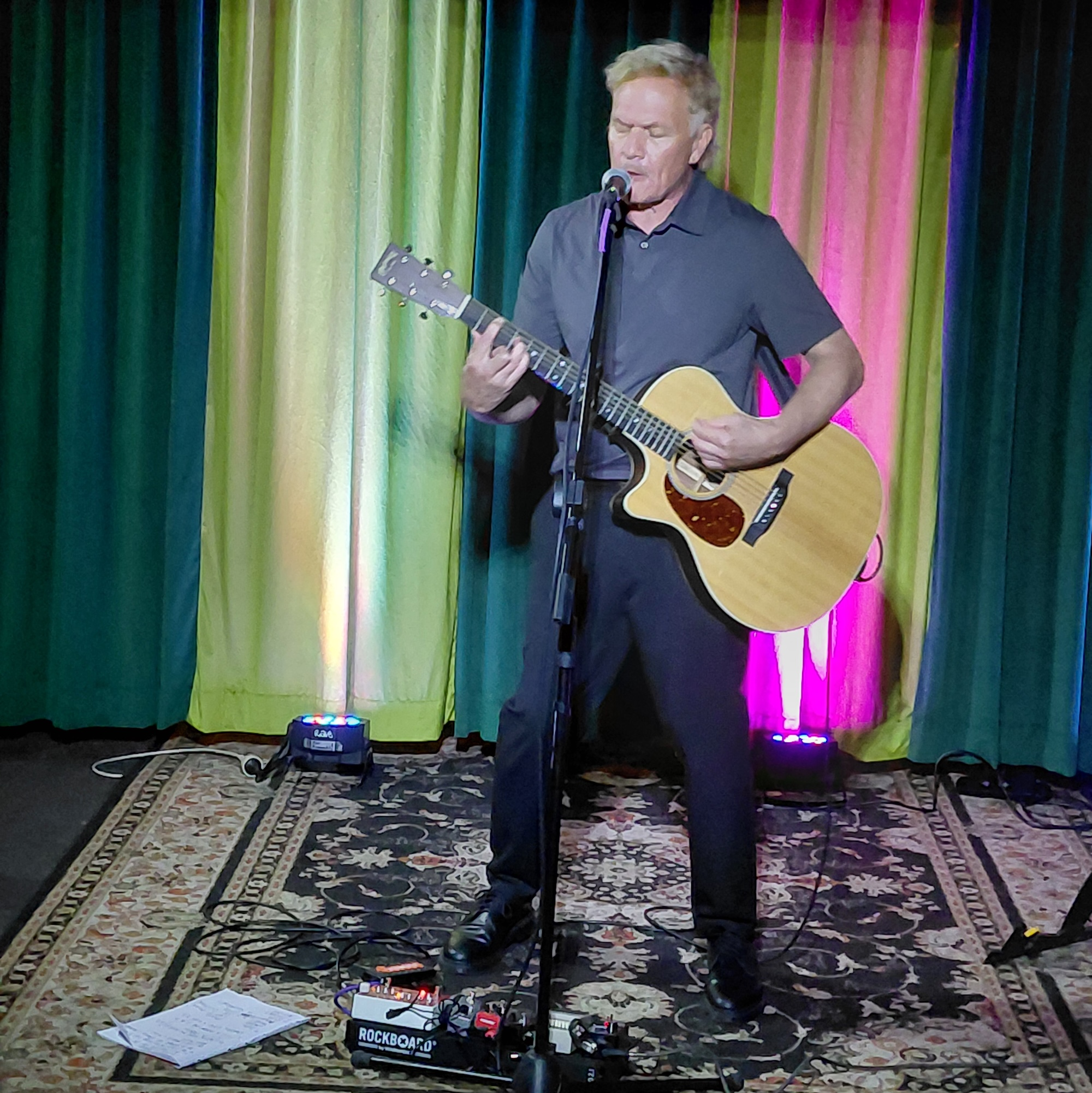
- Carter playing a solo show in Hamilton, 26 March 2026

Background information
- Born: Shayne P. Carter; Dunedin, New Zealand
- Instruments: Vocals, guitar
- Years active: 1979–present

Shayne P. Carter is a New Zealand musician best known for leading Straitjacket Fits from 1986 to 1994, and as the only permanent member of Dimmer (1995–2012).

Carter is a member of the New Zealand Music Hall of Fame, and has been awarded the New Zealand Herald Legacy Award (with Straitjacket Fits at the 2008 New Zealand Music Awards), and the recipient of several Aotearoa Music Awards including best band, album and top male vocalist with Straitjacket Fits and Dimmer.

New Zealand music critic Nick Bollinger told North & South magazine in 2019: "To me, Shayne Carter really stands head and shoulders above pretty much the whole of the Dunedin scene. I mean, there were some other brilliant musicians, don’t get me wrong. But that was the era when shoe-gazing was at its peak – they wore black jerseys, stared at their shoes, and strummed their meaningful, heartfelt songs. But Shayne was different. Shayne was a rock star, and he knew it. He was actually aware of his charisma and what it meant to be a performer."

Carter published his autobiography Dead People I Have Known in 2019. In May 2020 it won both the Royal Society Te Apārangi Award for General Non-Fiction and the MitoQ Best First Book Awards: E H McCormick Prize for General Non-Fiction at the Ockham New Zealand Book Awards. He was awarded an Arts Foundation Laureateship in 2020. In 2025 the film Life in One Chord was released, chronicling his life based on his book and directed by Margaret Gordon and narrated by Carol Hirschfeld.

== Early life and education ==
Shayne Carter comes from a musical family. He was born in 1964 to a Caucasian mother and a Māori father who was adopted by a Pākehā family.

Carter attended school at Kaikorai Valley High School.

== Career ==
While at Kaikorai in 1978, he formed the rock group Bored Games with Wayne Elsey (bass) and Fraser Batts (guitar), Jonathan Moore and Jeff Harford on drums. The group debuted at Kaikorai's talent quest in 1979, then went on to play a gig supporting Toy Love. When Elsey tired of being in the band (he and Carter having had arguments onstage at times) and left to form The Stones, he was replaced by Terry Moore. In 1981 Bored Games broke up, before the 1982 release of their only EP, Who Killed Colonel Mustard, on Flying Nun Records. Terry Moore would later join The Chills, which grew out of another Dunedin high school band, the Same. Musical historian John Dix calls Bored Games and the Same "the most important...teenage Dunedin bands" during the emergence of the Dunedin sound.

After finishing high school, Carter worked at Radio 4XO as a journalist for 2½ years, and later worked for fledgling campus radio station Radio One.

=== The DoubleHappys ===
In 1983, Carter reunited with former Bored Games bandmate Wayne Elsey. Elsey's band The Stones split up in August 1983, so he and Carter formed DoubleHappys, along with a temperamental toy drum machine they called "Herbie Fuckface".

Carter and Elsey would be really hitting it, showing off their musical prowess, tearing off a Bathgate-type assault, feeding back, tension building, except... Herbie would be left behind at the second furlong: Rrrooomchchchchch Rrrooomchchchchch Rrrooomchchchchch. At other times...out would come some terrible bossa nova.

Carter and Elsey eventually recruited their high school friend John Collie to replace the machine before touring New Zealand with Flying Nun's Looney Tour in 1984. The same year they recorded the "Double B-Side" 7" single. In 1985, the group released the "Cut It Out" EP. While on tour later that year, Wayne Elsey was killed in a freak accident on a train.

=== Straitjacket Fits ===
Carter and Collie continued on the year after Elsey's death, recruiting David Wood (bass) and Andrew Brough (guitar, vocals) and naming the new band Straitjacket Fits. The band then recorded their first EP, Life in One Chord. Straitjacket Fits were considered the best of the bands to emerge from Dunedin at that time, although they had built more of a solid following overseas than in New Zealand. Brough, who also contributed songwriting, had a style that contrasted with Carter's. Brough's songs concentrated on melodies and pop-hooks while Carter's songs were more guitar-driven and edgy.

The band then moved briefly to Christchurch before settling in Auckland. They released their first album Hail in 1988. They recorded Melt in 1990. Due to musical difference with Carter, Brough left the band and was replaced by Mark Petersen. By the time they put out Blow in 1993, the band signed to Arista records to a potentially lucrative worldwide deal. However, by 1994, they had broken up.

Straitjacket Fits reformed for a reunion tour during April and May 2005 without Andrew Brough.

=== Shayne Carter & Peter Jefferies ===
Shayne has released 2 singles with Peter Jefferies:

- "Randolph's Going Home/Hooked, Lined And Sunken", 1986, Flying Nun Records FNCJ001
- "Knocked Out Or Thereabouts/Spark Off A Wire", 1992, Flying Nun Records FN236

=== Dimmer ===
Following the demise of Straitjacket Fits, in 1995 Carter formed the group Dimmer. This began largely as a solo project with Carter as the creative nucleus, working with different musicians for recordings and performances. In its later years, Dimmer was a settled four-piece band.

There were four Dimmer albums released, with You've Got To Hear the Music (2004) the most successful. It was certified Gold in New Zealand, and led to New Zealand Music Awards for Best Album and Best Group and was critically acclaimed by critics such as Nick Bollinger.

Carter disbanded Dimmer in 2012 with a series of final concerts in Auckland and Wellington.

=== Shayne P Carter, Offsider ===
At the same time as calling an end to Dimmer in 2012, Carter described a new plan to learn piano, and record an album with it as the main instrument. Piano became part of his live shows in 2014, and in August that year he launched a crowdfunding campaign for "a new album in its final stages of production" - written entirely on piano, and recorded ("free of record company backing") with Gary Sullivan and other guests. The successful campaign had a goal of $8,000 and raised over $9,500.

Performing and recording as Shayne P Carter, he announced the album name Offsider in 2015. The first music released from Offsider came out more than a year later, in June 2016, when the song 'We Will Rise Again' appeared as a digital download.

== Discography ==
=== Albums ===
Year	Title	Details	Peak chart positions
Year	Title	Details	NZ
2016	Offsider	Released: Format: CD, LP, digital download; Catalogue: FN571; Label: Flying Nun Records	27

=== Singles ===
Year	Single	Peak chart positions	Album
Year	Single	NZ	Album
1986	"Randolph's Going Home" (as Shayne Carter & Peter Jefferies)	—	Non-album single
1992	" Knocked Out Or Thereabouts" (as Shayne Carter & Peter Jefferies)	—	Non-album single

== Awards ==
=== Aotearoa Music Awards ===
The Aotearoa Music Awards (previously known as New Zealand Music Awards (NZMA)) are an annual awards night celebrating excellence in New Zealand music and have been presented annually since 1965.

Year	Nominee / work	Award	Result	Ref.
2008	Shayne Carter (as part of Straitjacket Fits)	New Zealand Music Hall of Fame	inductee	
