= Straitjacket Fits =

New Zealand band

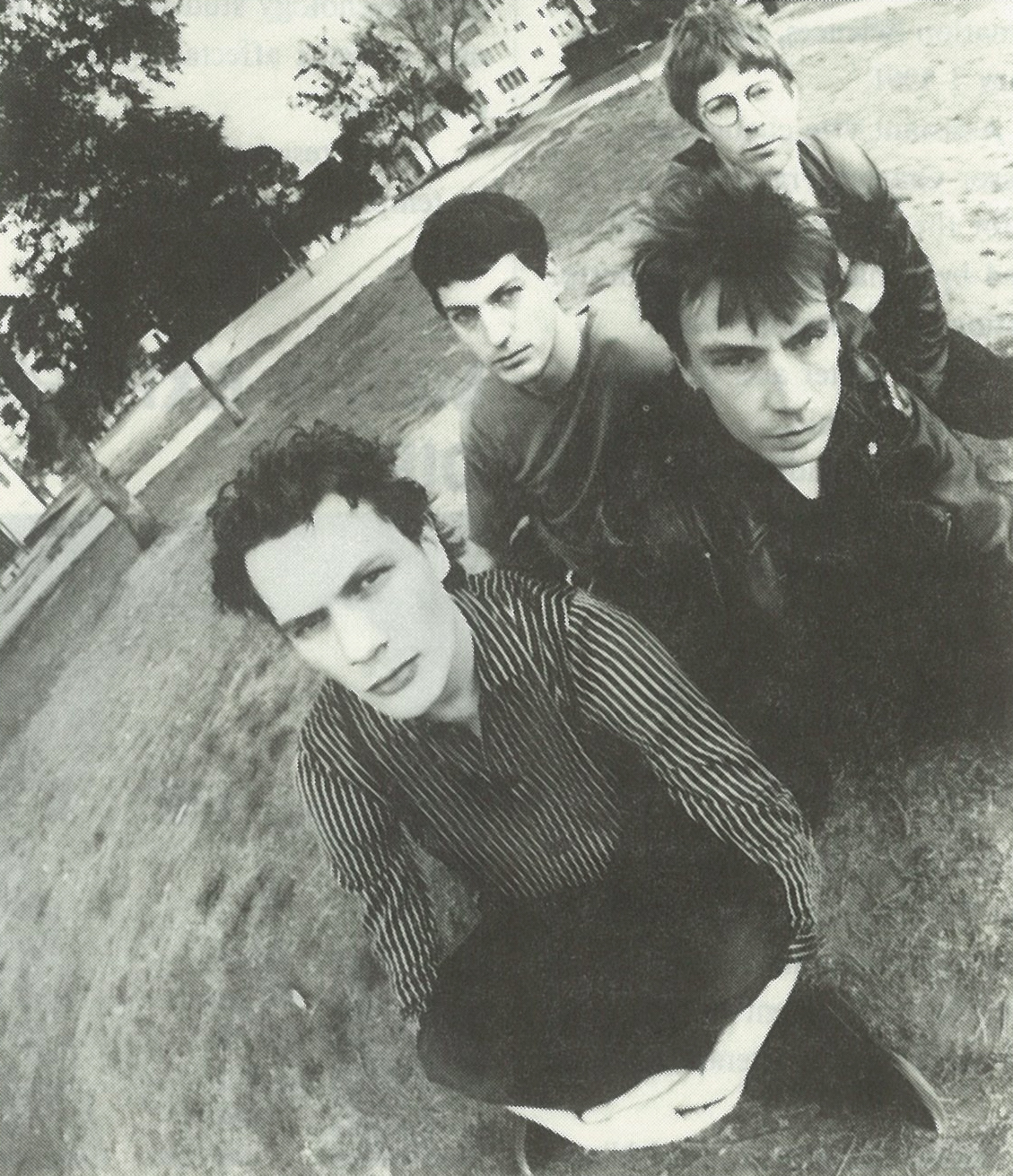
- Straitjacket Fits in 1991

Background information
- Origin: Dunedin, New Zealand
- Genres: Rock, alternative rock, indie rock, Dunedin sound
- Years active: 1986–1994
- Labels: Flying Nun, Rough Trade, Arista
- Past members: Shayne Carter; John Collie; David Wood; Andrew Brough; Mark Petersen

Straitjacket Fits were a four-piece alternative indie rock band that formed in Dunedin, New Zealand, in 1986 and broke up in 1994. They released three studio albums, Hail (1988), Melt (1990), and Blow (1993), and several EPs. Their line-up for their first two albums consisted of Shayne Carter (vocals and guitar), John Collie (drums), David Wood (bass), and Andrew Brough (guitar and vocals). Brough departed the band in 1991 and was replaced for the band's final album by Mark Petersen.

Straitjacket Fits were a prominent band in the Flying Nun label's second wave of the Dunedin sound. They were inducted into the New Zealand Music Hall of Fame in 2008 and have three songs in the APRA Top 100 New Zealand Songs of All Time list, "She Speeds", "Down in Splendour", and "If I Were You".

In 2025 the film Life in One Chord was released, directed by Margaret Gordon and covers the lifespan of Straitjacket Fits.

== Biography ==
Like many of their Flying Nun stable-mates, the band hailed from the southern city of Dunedin. They formed from the remnants of The DoubleHappys, a band comprising Shayne Carter, Wayne Elsey and John Collie. The accidental death of Elsey saw Carter and Collie join forces with David Wood (ex-Working With Walt) in 1986 to form Straitjacket Fits. Andrew Brough (from The Orange) signed on the following year, adding a foil in the form of a pop sensibility to Carter's more raucous songwriting. From their inception, the sound of the band was marked by the seemingly incongruous but effective pairing of Carter's rough abrasive voice and strident guitar and Andrew Brough's sweet vocals and pop hooks.

=== Pre-1990: Life in One Chord and Hail ===
1987 marked the release of the band's first EP. Life in One Chord spent 10 weeks in the Top 50. Of the four songs, "She Speeds", was to become a hallmark song. It was later judged one of New Zealand's ten best popular songs to date. The edgy lead vocal (from Carter) was underpinned with a dynamic jagged guitar and stabs of strings which tumbled into a churning melodic chorus on which Brough's voice soared. The opposite approach was taken on "Sparkle That Shines", its gentle downbeat melody sung by Brough giving way to a chorus laced with Carter's knife-edge harmonies.

The band left Dunedin, briefly moving to Christchurch, before making the shift to the country's main marketplace, Auckland in 1988. Their first album Hail was produced by Terry Moore (a former member of The Chills) and was released later that year (it would later be re-released on CD, accompanied by the four songs from Life in One Chord). The band's first overseas venture, to Australia, came in 1989, followed soon by a tour of Europe. The band were in Berlin the week the wall fell.

=== 1990: Melt and Brough's departure ===
In 1990 the band started work on their follow-up album Melt (produced by Gavin Mackillop), which was to produce moderate hits with the Brough composition "Down in Splendour" and Carter's "Bad Note for a Heart". The following year the band was back on the road with an extensive tour. Straitjacket Fits supported My Bloody Valentine in Australia and The La's in the United States. But the strain was beginning to show, with reputed "musical differences" between Carter and Brough. Brough left the band at the end of the tour, and was replaced by guitarist Mark Petersen. Brough later formed Bike in 1995 with bassist Tristan Mason and drummer Karl Buckley, and after signing to Flying Nun the group issued its debut single "Save My Life" in 1996. The record earned them a nomination as Most Promising New Band at the NZ Music Awards, and was also a finalist for APRA's Silver Scroll songwriting award. Bike's self-titled debut album followed in 1997.

=== 1992-4: Done, Blow, and breakup ===
1992 saw the release of EP Done. It reached number 11 on the New Zealand Top 40 singles chart. Produced by Tony Cohen in Melbourne and without Brough's involvement, Done was an altogether louder and more guitar-driven record. The band then moved to California to record their third album Blow, with producer Paul Fox. The album was released in 1993, but lacked the carefully balanced dynamic that had always been evident in the interplay between Carter and Brough. It produced the singles, "Cat Inna Can" and "If I Were You". A US tour culminated with an appearance on Late Night with Conan O'Brien on 11 November 1993, but the writing was largely on the wall for the band and they decided to go into a semi-permanent hiatus, following their appearance at 1994's Big Day Out.

In 1993, the band contributed the track "Brittle" to the AIDS-Benefit Album No Alternative produced by the Red Hot Organization.

=== Legacy, post-SJF music, and reunions ===
In 1998, a self-titled CD was released. Its 16 tracks were all previously available on other releases; the CD is essentially a "best-of" compilation.

Post-Straitjacket Fits, Shayne Carter found success with his band Dimmer, whose first album bore little similarity to that of Straitjacket Fits. Allowed more complete control of the music's sound, his band's music was sparser and included more electronics. Gone are the strident guitars, although they returned on some later releases. Andrew Brough released one album with the band Bike, before moving back to Dunedin and retreating from the music scene. John Collie became a photographer of some note who has exhibited his work widely.

In 2001, as part of the Australasian Performing Right Association's 75th anniversary, a poll was conducted on New Zealand's top 100 songs of all time. Straitjacket Fits' song "She Speeds" was voted at number nine. "Down in Splendour" was at number 32, and "If I Were You" at number 88.

In 2005, Straitjacket Fits reformed without Brough for a brief series of concerts around New Zealand.

In 2008, the band received the New Zealand Herald Legacy Award at the Vodafone New Zealand Music Awards, and were inducted into the New Zealand Music Hall of Fame. In his acceptance speech, Carter said "To all the artists out there who are brave enough to think outside of the square – kia kaha."

David Wood died suddenly, on 17 November 2010. A service for David was held at the Pt Chevalier RSA on the following Monday. He left behind a wife and two children.

Andrew Brough died on 2 February 2020.

==== One-off show as Dimmer's "special guests", King's Arms, 2018 ====
The imminent closure of Auckland venue the King's Arms in 2018 led to of a one-off reunion of Dimmer (Shayne Carter's post-SJF band) and a group of "special guests" on 9 February. Those guests were John Collie and Mark Petersen who, along with Carter and Dimmer bassist Vaughan Williams, played a set of Straitjacket Fits songs (without taking on the band name). It was the first time Carter, Collie and Petersen had performed without the late David Wood.

== Band members ==
- Shayne Carter – guitar, vocals (1986–1994)
- John Collie – drums (1986–1994)
- David Wood – bass (1986–1994) (died 2010)
- Andrew Brough – guitar, vocals (1987–1991) (died 2020)
- Mark Petersen – guitar (1991–94)

== Discography ==
=== Albums ===
Year	Title	Details	Peak chart positions
Year	Title	Details	NZ
1988	Hail	Released: 1988; Label: Flying Nun Records (NZ), Rough Trade (US/UK), Catalogue: FN105 (NZ), UKR147 (US/UK)	31
1989	Hail (compilation)	Label: Flying Nun Records, Rough Trade; Catalogue: FN144, ROUGHCD147	—
1990	Melt	Released: 25 June 1991; Label: Flying Nun Records; Catalogue: FN174, ARCD-8645	13
1993	Blow	Released: 25 May 1993; Label: Flying Nun Records, Arista; Catalogue: FN251, 18697-2	12
1998	Straitjacket Fits	Released: 28 November 2000; Label: Flying Nun Records; Catalogue: FN406	—
"—" denotes a recording that did not chart or was not released in that territory.

=== EPs ===
Year	Title	Details	Peak chart positions
Year	Title	Details	NZ
1987	Life in One Chord	Released: Label: Flying Nun Records; Catalogue: FN080	16
1991	Bad Note for a Heart	Label: Flying Nun Records; Catalogue: FN176	29
1991	Missing From Melt	Released: Label: Arista; Catalogue: ASCD-2244	—
1992	Done	Released: Label: Flying Nun Records; Catalogue: FN242	—
"—" denotes a recording that did not chart or was not released in that territory.

=== Singles ===
Year	Title	Peak chart positions	Album
Year	Title	NZ	Album
1988	"Hail"	20	Hail
1990	"Sparkle That Shines"	—	Hail
1990	"Bad Note for a Heart"	29	Melt
1990	"Down in Splendour" (double 7")	—	Melt
1991	"Down in Splendour" (Video/CD)	—	Melt
1991	"Roller Ride"	—	Melt
1992	"Done"	11	Blow
1993	"Cat Inna Can"	19	Blow
1993	"If I Were You"	—	Blow
"—" denotes a recording that did not chart or was not released in that territory.

=== Featured appearances ===
The group has appeared on many compilations and soundtracks since their inception in both New Zealand. The following is a list of these albums that have featured tracks by the Straitjacket Fits.

- In Love With These Times (1988) Flying Nun Records – "She Speeds"
- Getting Older 1981–1991 (1991) Flying Nun Records – "Dialing a Prayer"
- Pink Flying Saucers Over the Southern Alps (1991) Flying Nun Records – "Bad Note for a Heart"
- No Alternative (1993) Arista Records – "Brittle"
- Topless Women Talk About Their Lives (1997) Flying Nun Records – "Down in Splendour" and "She Speeds"
- Scarfies (1999) Flying Nun Records – "She Speeds"
- Nature's Best (2002) Sony Music – "She Speeds"
- Nature's Best 2 (2002) Sony Music – "Down in Splendour"
- Nature's Best 3 (2003) Sony Music – "If I Were You"

=== Featured DVD appearances ===
- Very Short Films: A Flying Nun DVD (2003) Flying Nun Records – "She Speeds"
- Second Season: Flying Nun DVD II (2004) Flying Nun Records – "Down in Splendour"

== Awards ==
=== Aotearoa Music Awards ===
The Aotearoa Music Awards (previously known as New Zealand Music Awards (NZMA)) are an annual awards night celebrating excellence in New Zealand music and have been presented annually since 1965.

Year	Nominee / work	Award	Result	Ref.
2008	Straitjacket Fits	New Zealand Music Hall of Fame	inductee	
