= Stranded in Paradise: New Zealand Rock'n'Roll, 1955–1988 =

Book on the history of rock music in New Zealand

Stranded in Paradise: New Zealand Rock'n'Roll, 1955–1988 is a book by New Zealand music historian John Dix, published in 1988. An updated edition, Stranded In Paradise: New Zealand Rock And Roll, 1955 to The Modern Era, was published in 2005.

== Content ==
It has been described as It was the first proper history of New Zealand rock and roll. It was originally published in 1988. It was published by Paradise Publications in 1988. The book covers how New Zealand's culture has developed, as well as early Māori music. Acts such as Dragon, Split Enz, Bruno Lawrence, and Hello Sailor are included.

== Reception ==
John Dix wrote in 2014 that there was some criticism of the book as being "too subjective, and written by an immigrant at that".

According to the blurb of the updated edition, Stranded in Paradise: New Zealand Rock'n'Roll, 1955–1988 "was the first proper history of New Zealand rock and roll, told as a series of inter-linking, anecdotal stories".

== 2005 edition ==
The updated 2005 edition, published on the "50th anniversary of first proper rock and roll recording made in New Zealand", is called Stranded In Paradise: New Zealand Rock And Roll, 1955 to The Modern Era.

== Author note ==
John Dix (born 1951), migrated with his family from Wales to South Australia in 1967. He was a fan of soul music as a youth, and frequented gigs in Cardiff and then in Adelaide and Melbourne, gradually coming to appreciate some Australian bands. He moved to Wellington in 1972, and four years later to Auckland, getting to know the New Zealand music scene. He went on to found the music and pop culture magazine Real Groove in 1993.

== See also ==
- Music of New Zealand
