= Dogma (disambiguation) =

Dogma is an established belief, doctrine or set of theological tenets.

Dogma may also refer to:

== Film and television ==
- Dogma (film), a 1999 film by Kevin Smith
- Dogma (studio), a Japanese adult video company
- Dogma (TV series), a 2017–2018 Mexican anthology series

== Music ==
- Dogma, an Australian group, best known for their 2002 single, "Step into the Music"
- Dogma (international metal band), an international all-female heavy metal band
- Dogma (Tall Dwarfs album), 1987
- Dogma (The Gazette album) or the title song, 2015
- Dogma (Crown the Empire album), 2023
- Dogma: Music from the Motion Picture, a soundtrack album from the 1999 film
- Dogma, an EP by Mr FijiWiji, 2016
- "Dogma", a song by KMFDM from Xtort, 1996
- "Dogma", a song by Marilyn Manson from Portrait of an American Family, 1994
- "I. Dogma", a song by Mick Gordon from Doom, 2016

== Other uses ==
- DOGMA (Developing Ontology-Grounded Methods and Applications), a computer science research project
- Dogma, a 2012 novel by Lars Iyer

== See also ==
- Dogmatic (film), a 1999 Canadian-American television film
- Dogmatics – Theology of theoretical official truths
- Dogmatix, a fictional dog in the Asterix series
- Dogme 95, a filmmaking method
