= Hello Cruel World (Tall Dwarfs album) =

Compilation album by Tall Dwarfs
- Released: 1987; 2005 (rerelease)
- Label: Flying Nun Records

Tall Dwarfs chronology
Dogma (1987)	Hello Cruel World (1987)	Weeville (1990)

Professional ratings
Review scores
Source	Rating
AllMusic	4/5 stars

Hello Cruel World is an album by New Zealand band Tall Dwarfs, released in 1987. In 2005, the album was rereleased as an 18-track CD.

The songs on the album were compiled from the band's first four EPs; Three Songs, Louis Likes His Daily Dip, Canned Music and Slugbucket Hairybreath Monster.

== Track listing ==
- Original release
1. "Nothing's Going To Happen"
2. "Luck Or Loveliness"
3. "All My Hollowness To You"
4. "Louis The First"
5. "Maybe"
6. "Pictures On The Floor"
7. "Paul's Place"
8. "Clover"
9. "Song Of The Silents"
10. "Louis The Second"
11. "Canopener"
12. "Beauty"
13. "This Room Is Wrong"
14. "Walking Home"
15. "Turning Brown + Torn In Two"
16. "Woman"
17. "Shade For Today"
18. "Brain That Wouldn't Die"
19. "I've Left Memories Behind"
20. "Phil's Disease (Day 1)"
21. "Phil's Disease (Day 4)"
22. "Crush"
- 2005 release
1. "Nothing's Going To Happen"
2. "Luck Of Loveliness"
3. "All My Hollowness To You"
4. "Louis The First"
5. "Paul's Place"
6. "Clover"
7. "Song Of The Silents"
8. "Louis The Second"
9. "Canopener"
10. "Beauty"
11. "This Room Is Wrong"
12. "Walking Home"
13. "Shade For Today"
14. "Brain That Wouldn't Die"
15. "I've Left Memories Behind"
16. "Phil's Disease (Day 1)"
17. "Phil's Disease (Day 4)"
18. "Crush"
