= Hustvedt =

Hustvedt is a surname. Notable people with the surname include:

- Dick Hustvedt (1946–2008), American software engineer
- Lloyd Hustvedt (1922–2004), American professor and scholar of Norwegian-American history
- Olaf M. Hustvedt (1886–1978), American admiral
- Siri Hustvedt (born 1955), American novelist and essayist
- Svein Olaf Hustvedt, researcher
