= Fork Songs =

Studio album by Tall Dwarfs
- Released: 1991
- Recorded: 19–21 January 1991 at Longfellow St, Christchurch and 30–31 March 1991 at Hakanoa St, Auckland
- Genre: Indie rock, lo-fi
- Length: 67:35
- Label: Flying Nun
- Producer: Alec Bathgate, Chris Knox

Tall Dwarfs chronology
Weeville (1990)	Fork Songs (1991)	3 EPs (1994)

Fork Songs is an album by New Zealand band Tall Dwarfs released in 1991. Tracks 15 to 20 are bonus tracks on the CD, originally released in 1986 as Dogma EP.

== Track listing ==
1. "Dare To Tread"
2. "We Bleed Love"
3. "Wings"
4. "Skirl"
5. "Thought Disorder"
6. "Small Talk"
7. "Lowlands"
8. "Life Is Strange"
9. "Daddy"
10. "All Is Fine"
11. "Two Humans"
12. "Oatmeal"
13. "Boys"
14. "Think Small"
15. "Lurlene Bayliss"
16. "Waltz Of The Good Husband"
17. "The Slide"
18. "Can't"
19. "Dog"
20. "Missed Again"
