= Life Is Strange (disambiguation) =

Life Is Strange is a video game series that includes the eponymous title.

Life Is Strange may also refer to:

- Life Is Strange (video game), a video game first released in 2015

== Music ==
=== Songs ===
- "Life Is Strange", song by The Fugs, from It Crawled into My Hand, Honest 1968
- "Life Is Strange", song by rock band T. Rex from album Tanx 1973, written by Marc Bolan, and covered by several artists
- "Life Is Strange", song by New Zealand band Tall Dwarfs from Fork Songs 1991
- "Life Is Strange", song by American rock band Enuff Z'nuff from Tweaked 1994
- "Life Is Strange", song by Marina Diamandis from Love + Fear

== Other ==
- Life Is Strange (film) 2012 American documentary film by Isaac Hertz
