= ATPAF2 =

Protein-coding gene in the species Homo sapiens

Identifiers
- Aliases: ATPAF2, ATP12, ATP12p, MC5DN1, LP3663, ATP synthase mitochondrial F1 complex assembly factor 2
- External IDs: OMIM: 608918; MGI: 2180561; HomoloGene: 34602; GeneCards: ATPAF2; OMA:ATPAF2 - orthologs

Gene location (Human)
Chr.	Chromosome 17 (human)
Band	17p11.2	Start	17,977,409 bp
Band	17p11.2	End	18,039,209 bp

Gene location (Mouse)
Chr.	Chromosome 11 (mouse)
Band	11|11 B2	Start	60,291,452 bp
Band	11|11 B2	End	60,309,283 bp
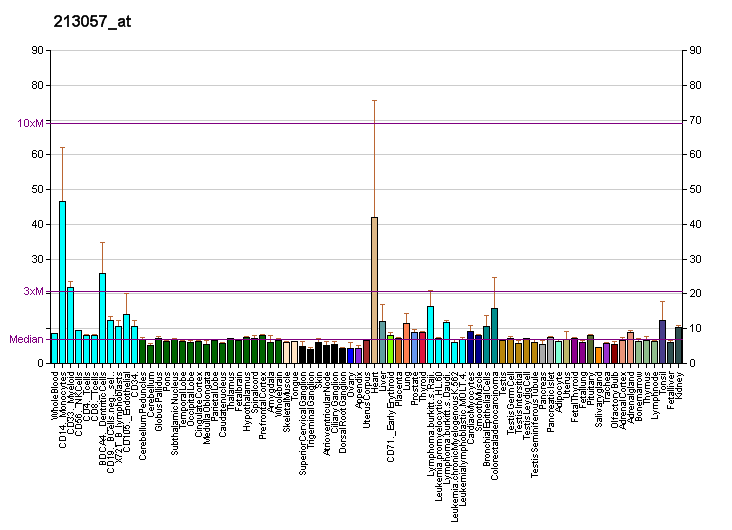
RNA expression pattern
Bgee	Human / Mouse (ortholog); Top expressed in: right testis; left testis; muscle of thigh; granulocyte; apex of heart; monocyte; right adrenal gland; mucosa of transverse colon; right lobe of liver; right adrenal cortex / Top expressed in: yolk sac; brown adipose tissue; interventricular septum; spermatid; spermatocyte; seminiferous tubule; right kidney; muscle of thigh; thymus; neural layer of retina; More reference expression data
BioGPS	More reference expression data
Gene ontology
Molecular function	protein binding
Cellular component	mitochondrion; nuclear speck; cytosol
Biological process	proton-transporting ATP synthase complex assembly
Sources:Amigo / QuickGO
Orthologs
Species	Human	Mouse
Entrez	91647	246782
Ensembl	ENSG00000171953	ENSMUSG00000042709
UniProt	Q8N5M1	Q91YY4
RefSeq (mRNA)	NM_145691	NM_145427; NM_001364117; NM_001364118
RefSeq (protein)	NP_663729	NP_663402; NP_001351046; NP_001351047
Location (UCSC)	Chr 17: 17.98 – 18.04 Mb	Chr 11: 60.29 – 60.31 Mb
PubMed search
- Wikidata
View/Edit Human	View/Edit Mouse

ATP synthase mitochondrial F1 complex assembly factor 2 is an enzyme that in humans is encoded by the ATPAF2 gene.

This gene encodes an assembly factor for the F(1) component of the mitochondrial ATP synthase. This protein binds specifically to the F1 alpha subunit and is thought to prevent the subunit from forming nonproductive homooligomers during enzyme assembly. This gene is located within the Smith–Magenis syndrome region on chromosome 17. An alternatively spliced transcript variant has been described, but its biological validity has not been determined. A mutation in this gene has caused nuclear type 1 Complex V deficiency, characterized by lactic acidosis, encephalopathy, and developmental delays.

== Structure ==
The ATPAF2 gene is located on the p arm of chromosome 17 in position 11.2 and spans 24,110 base pairs. The gene produces a 32.8 kDa protein composed of 289 amino acids. This gene has at least 8 exons and is located within the Smith-Magenis syndrome region on chromosome 17.

== Function ==
The ATPAF2 gene encodes an essential housekeeping protein, an assembly factor for the F1 component of mitochondrial ATP synthase. This protein binds specifically to the F1 alpha subunit and is thought to prevent this subunit from forming nonproductive homooligomers during enzyme assembly.

== Clinical significance ==
In the only report of a mutation in the ATPAF2 gene, the resulting phenotype was nuclear type 1 Complex V deficiency inherited in an autosomal recessive manner. A homozygous 280T-A transversion caused a W94R amino acid substitution adjacent to a highly conserved glutamine. Symptoms included elevated blood, CSF, and urine lactate levels, developmental delays with failure to thrive and seizures, and a degenerative encephalopathy with cortical and subcortical atrophy.

== Interactions ==
The encoded protein interacts with ATP5F1A and FMC1, along with many other proteins.
