= The Enemy (New Zealand band) =

- Origin: Dunedin, New Zealand
- Genre: Punk rock
- Years active: 1977–1978
- Past members: Chris Knox; Alec Bathgate; Mick Dawson; Mike Dooley; Phil Judd

The Enemy were a punk rock band from Dunedin, New Zealand, that are often seen as the starting point of the Dunedin sound rock movement.

Formed in September 1977 and fronted by vocalist Chris Knox with bassist Mick Dawson, drummer Mike Dooley, and guitarist Alec Bathgate, the band were strongly influenced by artists similar to those cited by the then-ascendant international punk rock music scene. Elements of Glam rock, hard rock and the catchy chart-pop music of the 1960s were fused with definitive proto-punk acts like Lou Reed and Iggy Pop (who is referred to in the song "Iggy Told Me", during the performance of which Knox would often intentionally cut himself, drawing blood). During the last months of 1978, bassist Mick Dawson left to return to Dunedin and former Split Enz member Phil Judd joined the band, but the lineup proved incompatible. Due to these and other tensions (the 'punk' label was becoming something of a burden), the Enemy ceased soon after.

Though the band did not release any official recordings, some of their performances and their few-but-extensive studio recordings (their entire 20-song repertoire was recorded in Auckland, October 1978 just before their November split) are available in bootleg form. With a solid 'originals-only' performance regime, the Enemy are seen as hugely influential on the development of New Zealand's indigenous rock music culture. Though the band only existed from 1977 to 1978, they created a distinct, idiosyncratic style and popularised an 'original music is crucial' attitude which helped facilitate the development of several local music scenes in both Dunedin and New Zealand in general.

Upon the demise of the Enemy, Bathgate, Dooley and Knox went on to form Toy Love. Toy Love played a number of songs that the Enemy had originally performed, though usually with some musical rearrangement or alteration of the sometimes-pungent lyrics. Songs that began with the Enemy but were subsequently utilised by Toy Love include "Swimming Pool", "I Don't Mind", "1978", "Squeeze", "Cold Meat", "I'm Not Bored" (which The Enemy introduced as "I'm Not Bored, I'm Dead"), and "Don't Catch Fire". After Toy Love broke up in October 1980, Bathgate and Knox remained together as Tall Dwarfs.

Early supporters of The Enemy included Dunedin brothers and musicians Hamish and David Kilgour. Hamish Kilgour reportedly suggested the name The Enemy, based on the band's sound; in response or retaliation, Knox commented that the Kilgours' own sound was "squeaky clean" – a comment that inspired the name of the Kilgours' band, The Clean.
