= Stroke: Songs for Chris Knox =

Compilation album by Various Artists
- Released: 16 November 2009
- Genre: Indie rock
- Length: 126:08
- Label: Merge

Stroke: Songs for Chris Knox is a benefit compilation released to raise money for the rehabilitation of New Zealand musician Chris Knox after he suffered from a stroke on 11 June 2009. The album features covers of Knox's songs by several New Zealand bands such as The Bats, The Checks, and The Verlaines, as well as prominent North American artists influenced by Knox.

Notable tracks include "Sign the Dotted Line", the first song released by Jeff Mangum in several years, "Pull Down the Shades", recorded by Jay Reatard shortly before his death, and two new songs by Knox himself ("Nappin' in Lapland" and "Sunday Song").

== Critical reception ==
Reviewers gave the album positive reviews. Pitchfork's Joshua Klein rated the album 8.2/10, noting that the quality of contributors "really shows how far Knox's influence has reached". Evan Sawdey of PopMatters gave the album 8/10 stars and said Stroke "is as smart, funny, and memorable a tribute album as you’re likely to find".

== Track listing ==
=== Disc 1 – "Yellow Disc" ===
1. Pull Down the Shades – Jay Reatard – 2:12
2. Rebel – The Checks – 2:42
3. Ain't it Nice – The Bleeding Allstars – 2:18
4. Don't Catch Fire – Peter Gutteridge – 6:39
5. Luck or Loveliness – The Chills – 3:16
6. Nothing's Going to Happen – David Kilgour – 3:37
7. All My Hollowness – The Crying Wolfs – 4:23
8. Beauty – Stephin Merritt – 3:29
9. Nostalgia's No Excuse – Portastatic – 2:09
10. Crush – The Mint Chicks – 4:15
11. I've Left Memories Behind – Jay Clarkson & Sam Clarkson – 3:04
12. Burning Blue – Sky Green Leopards – 2:26
13. The Slide – Shayne Carter – 3:36
14. Grand Mal – Pumice – 2:47
15. Knoxed Out – Hamish Kilgour – 6:25

=== Disc 2 – "Black Disc" ===
1. Not Given Lightly – Boh Runga – 3:27
2. Bodies – Red & Zeke (featuring Bill Doss and Neil Cleary) – 2:15
3. Sign the Dotted Line – Jeff Mangum – 2:10
4. Lapse – Bill Callahan – 6:29
5. Growth Spurt – Genghis Smith – 2:27
6. Coloured – Yo La Tengo – 3:34
7. Dunno Much About Life but I Know How to Breathe – A.C. Newman – 2:09
8. Glide – Alec Bathgate – 3:01
9. Inside Story – Don McGlashan – 3:38
10. The Outer Skin – Sean Donnelly – 3:53
11. What Goes Up – Lambchop – 3:02
12. Brave – The Mountain Goats – 3:31
13. Round These Walls – The Tokey Tones (and friends) – 3:32
14. Just Do It – The Bats – 3:45
15. My Only Friend – Bonnie "Prince" Billy – 4:27
16. It's Love – The Finn Family – 2:41
17. Becoming Something Other – Jordan Luck – 5:20
18. Driftwood – The Verlaines – 4:31
19. Song of the Tall Poppy – Lou Barlow – 3:17
20. Nappin' in Lapland – The Nothing – 3:45
21. Sunday Song – Tall Dwarfs – 1:56
