= Seizure (disambiguation) =

Seizure may refer to:

== Arts, entertainment, and media ==
- Seizure (album), a 1989 album by New Zealand musician Chris Knox
- Seizure (Cook novel), a 2003 novel by Robin Cook
- Seizure (film), a 1974 film by Oliver Stone
- Seizure (journal), a peer-reviewed journal covering epilepsy
- Seizure (Reichs novel), a 2011 novel by Kathy Reichs
- "Seizure", a season 1 episode of Law & Order: Criminal Intent
- "Seizure" (Dynasty), an episode of Dynasty (1981 TV series)
- Seizures (album), a 2009 studio album by Kisschasy

== Law ==
- Descriptive seizure (also called "Anton Piller order" in the UK and "saisie-contrefaçon" in France), a court order to search premises and seize and/or describe evidence without prior warning
- Seizure (law enforcement), when an authority takes possession of an object until a case is resolved
- Distraint, the seizure of property to attain an owed payment

== Medicine ==
- Convulsion, a synonym for seizure
- Epileptic seizure, caused by abnormal, rhythmic discharges of cortical neurons
- Non-epileptic seizure, which mimics epileptic seizure but has a different cause

== Other uses ==
- Seizure, the act of a communications circuit going off-hook
