= The Sky Above the Mud Below =

The Sky Above The Mud Below

Studio album by Tall Dwarfs
- Released: 2002
- Genre: Indie rock, lo-fi
- Length: 68:11
- Label: Flying Nun Records

Tall Dwarfs chronology
Fifty Flavours of Glue (1998)	The Sky Above The Mud Below (2002)

Professional ratings
Review scores
Source	Rating
Allmusic	4/5 stars

The Sky Above the Mud Below is an album by New Zealand band Tall Dwarfs released in 2002. It includes an International Tall Dwarfs EP called The Weidenhaüsen Impediment ("FREE!!!"), but it remains unclear whether this was also released separately. Friends of the band recorded sounds for this EP, which were then turned into songs by Bathgate and Knox (similar to the way Stumpy had come about). The Sky Above the Mud Below (not The Sky Above, the Mud Below as Allmusic spells it), is the most recent album released by the Tall Dwarfs.

The cover painting by Chris Knox depicts Mrs Nancy Pomeroy in her kitchen/dining room in Invercargill. In his youth, Chris, who lived in the next street, would often visit the Pomeroys. The picture makes prominent lower middle class decoration typical of Invercargill in the 1960s.

== Track listing ==
- The Sky Above the Mud Below
1. "Meet the Beatle"
2. "Beached Boy"
3. "Deodorant"
4. "Michael Hillbilly"
5. "Room to Breathe"
6. "Right at Home"
7. "Time to Wait"
8. "Melancholy"
9. "We are the Chosen Few"
10. "Baby it's Over"
11. "Cascade"
12. "The Beautiful Invader"
13. "Big Brain of the World"
14. "You Want me Shimmy"
15. "How the West was Won"
16. "OK Forever"
17. "Your Unmade Eye"
- The Weidenhaüsen Impediment
1. "Seduced by Rock n Roll"
2. "Amniotic Love"
3. "Carsick"
4. "Wax"
5. "Open Wide your Pretty Mouths"
6. "Possum Born"
7. "Over the Waves"
8. "The Runout Groove"
