= Siri Hustvedt =

American novelist, essayist, poet (born 1955)

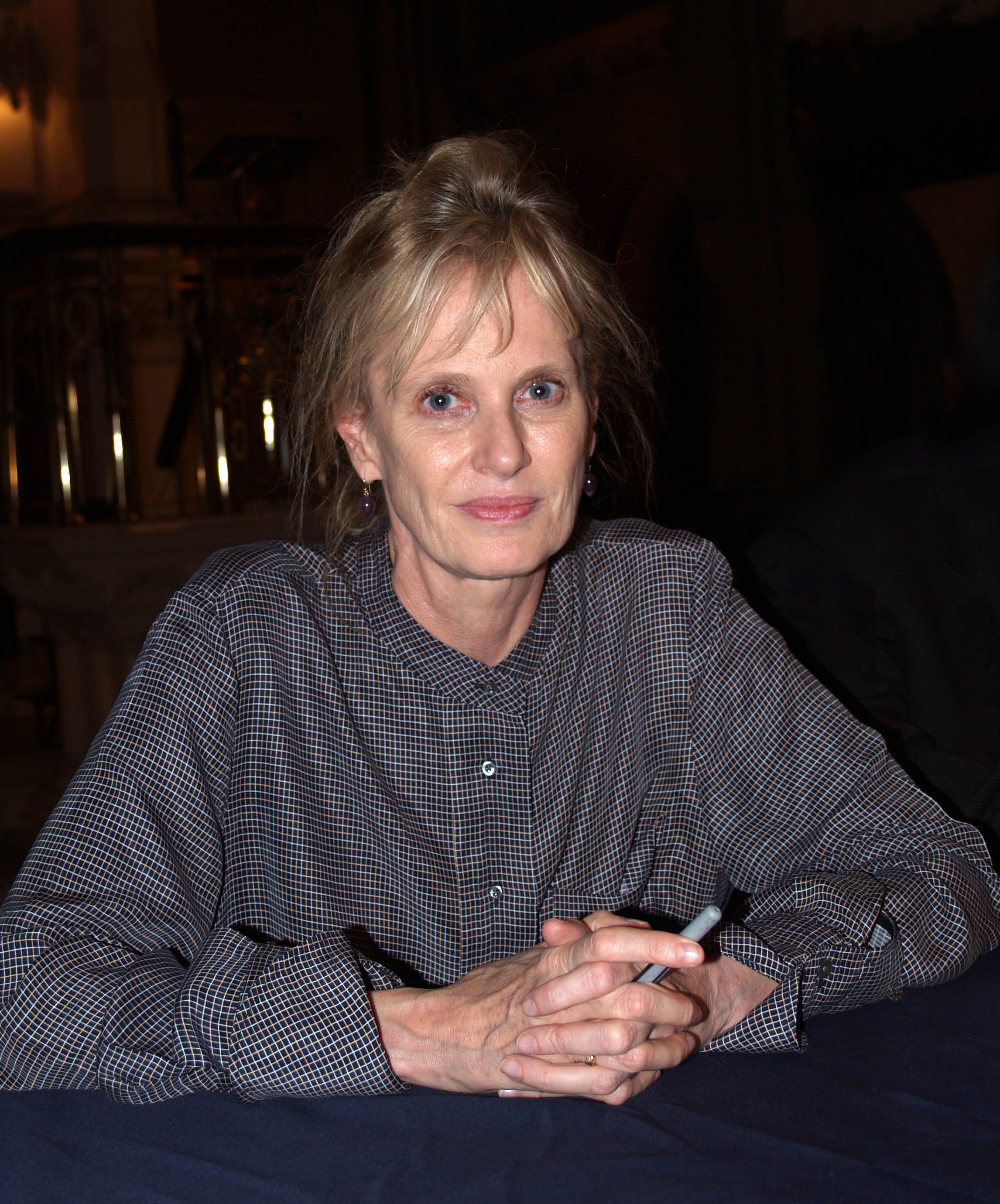
- Hustvedt in 2014
- Born: February 19, 1955 (age 71); Northfield, Minnesota, U.S.
- Education: St. Olaf College (BA); Columbia University (PhD)
- Occupation: Writer
- Spouse: Paul Auster (m. 1982; died 2024)
- Children: Sophie Auster
- Parent(s): Lloyd Hustvedt; Ester Vegan
- Writing career
- Years active: 1983–present
- Genres: Novels, poetry, short stories
- Website: www.sirihustvedt.net

Siri Hustvedt (born February 19, 1955) is an American novelist and essayist. Hustvedt is the author of a book of poetry, seven novels, two books of essays, and several works of non-fiction. Her books include The Blindfold (1992), The Enchantment of Lily Dahl (1996), What I Loved (2003), for which she is best known, A Plea for Eros (2006), The Sorrows of an American (2008), The Shaking Woman or A History of My Nerves (2010), The Summer Without Men (2011), Living, Thinking, Looking (2012), The Blazing World (2014), Memories of the Future (2019), and Ghost Stories (2026). What I Loved and The Summer Without Men were international bestsellers. Her work has been translated into over thirty languages.

== Early life ==
Hustvedt was born on February 19, 1955, in Northfield, Minnesota. The daughter of American professor Lloyd Hustvedt and a Norwegian mother, Hustvedt grew up speaking both English and Norwegian. She attended public school in her hometown of Northfield and received a diploma from the Cathedral School in Bergen, Norway, in 1973.

She started writing at 13 after a family trip to Reykjavík, where she read various works of classic literature. Particularly impressed by Dickens's David Copperfield, she decided after finishing it that she wanted to make literature her profession. Hustvedt graduated from St. Olaf College with a B.A. in history in 1977. She moved to New York City to attend Columbia University as a graduate student in 1978. Her first published work was a poem in The Paris Review. There were periods of time during her college years when Hustvedt lived in poverty, and she had to resort to an emergency loan from the university to survive.

== Career ==
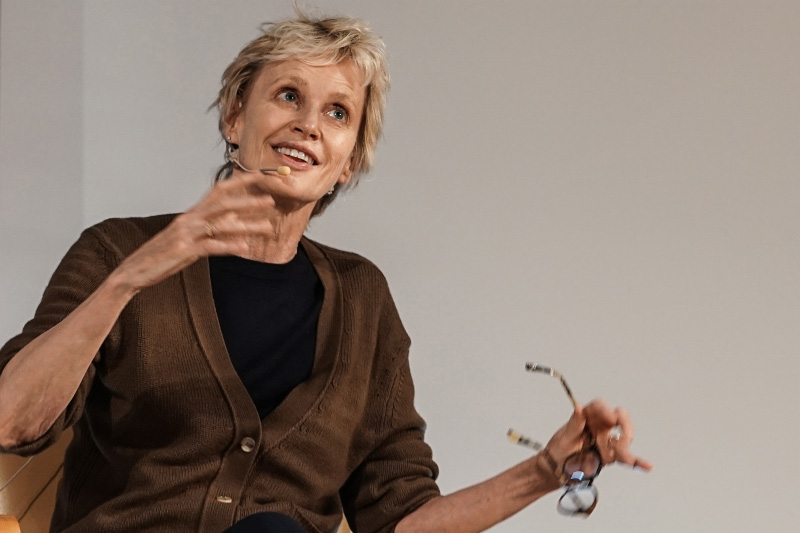
Hustvedt at LiteratureXchange Festival, Denmark 2019

A small collection of poems, Reading to You, appeared in 1982 with Station Hill Press.

She completed her PhD in English at Columbia in 1986. Her dissertation on Charles Dickens, Figures of Dust: A Reading of Our Mutual Friend, is an exploration of language and identity in the novel, with particular emphasis on Dickens's metaphors of fragmentation, his use of pronouns, and their relation to a narrative, dialogical conception of self. She refers in the dissertation to thinkers who influenced her later writing, including Søren Kierkegaard, Emile Benveniste, Roman Jakobson, Mikhail Bakhtin, Sigmund Freud, Jacques Lacan, Mary Douglas, Paul Ricoeur, and Julia Kristeva.

After finishing her dissertation, Hustvedt began writing prose. Two stories of the four that would become her first novel, The Blindfold, were published in literary magazines and later included in Best American Short Stories 1990 and 1991. Since then she has continued to write fiction and publish essays on the intersections between philosophy, psychoanalysis, and neuroscience. She also writes regularly about visual art. Hustvedt gave the third annual Schelling lecture on aesthetics at the Academy of Fine Arts, Munich.

She has also given talks at the Prado in Madrid and the Metropolitan Museum of Art in New York and published a volume of essays on painting: Mysteries of the Rectangle. In 2011, she delivered the annual Sigmund Freud lecture in Vienna, one of a distinguished list of speakers that includes Leo Bersani, Juliet Mitchell, Jessica Benjamin, Mark Solms, and Judith Butler.

== Themes ==
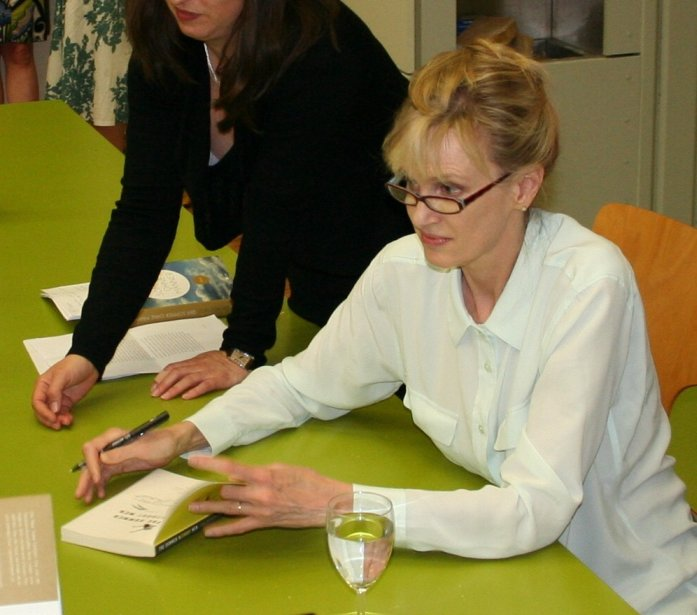
Hustvedt at Heidelberg University in Heidelberg, Germany in 2011

Hustvedt is a scholar and intellectual who engages with fundamental questions of contemporary ethics and epistemology. In her visits to European and German universities, she has given readings from her works and contributed to the interdisciplinary dialogue between the humanities and the sciences, notably in a keynote lecture and panel discussion on the relationship between the life sciences and literature at the 2012 annual conference of the German Association for American Studies in Mainz. In 2013, she delivered the opening keynote address at an international conference on Søren Kierkegaard in Copenhagen on the occasion of his 200th birthday.

Hustvedt has published essays and papers in academic journals, including Contemporary Psychoanalysis, Seizure: European Journal of Epilepsy, Neuropsychoanalysis, and Clinical Neurophysiology. Her collection of essays Living, Thinking, Looking demonstrates her intellectual range across several disciplines. In 2012, she received the International Gabarron Prize for Thought and Humanities. The Blazing World was long-listed for the Booker Prize, and she received an honorary doctorate from the University of Oslo.

Her works pose questions about the nature of identity, selfhood and perception. In The Shaking Woman or A History of My Nerves, an account of her seizure disorder, Hustvedt states her need to view her symptom not "through a single-window" but "from all angles." These multiple perspectives do not resolve themselves into a single view but rather create an atmosphere of ambiguity and flux. Hustvedt presents the reader with characters whose minds are inseparable from their bodies and their environments and whose sense of self is situated on the threshold between the conscious and unconscious. Her characters often suffer traumatic events that disrupt the rhythms of their lives and lead to disorientation and a discontinuity of their identities. Hustvedt's concern with embodied identity manifests itself in her investigation of gender roles and interpersonal relations. Both her fiction and nonfiction highlight the dynamics of the gaze and questions of ethics in art.

== Awards and recognitions ==
A section of The Blindfold was made into a movie by the French filmmaker Claude Miller. The film La Chambre des Magiciennes won The International Critics Prize at the Berlin Film Festival. What I Loved was on the initial shortlist for the Prix Femina Étranger in France for best foreign book of the year. It was also short-listed for Waterstone's Literary Fiction Award in England and the Barcelona Bookseller's Award in Spain. It won the Prix des libraires du Quebec in Canada for best book of 2003. The Summer Without Men was also shortlisted for The Femina Prize in 2011.

The Blazing World was longlisted for the 2014 Man Booker Prize and won the 2015 Los Angeles Times Book Prize for Fiction.

In 2015, Hustvedt was appointed as a lecturer in psychiatry at the Dewitt Wallace Institute for the History of Psychiatry, Department of Psychiatry, Weill Medical School of Cornell University.

Hustvedt is the 2012 recipient of the Gabarron International Award for Thought and Humanities. In 2014, she received an honorary doctorate from the University of Oslo. She received honorary doctorates from the Université Stendhal-Grenoble, France, in 2015, and from Gutenberg University-Mainz, Germany, in 2016. In 2019 she was awarded the Princess of Asturias Award in Literature. She won The Sigourney Award for Fusing Psychoanalysis, Literature and Culture to Advance Psychoanalysis' Relevance in 2025.

In May 2023, Hustvedt was honored at a Chanel-sponsored event at the Metrograph Theatre in New York City that celebrated women's empowerment through literature. The event was hosted by philosopher and writer Charlotte Casiraghi along with the author and literary critic Erica Wagner. The poet Rachel Eliza Griffiths was part of the discussion around the mind-body connection that figures so richly in Hustvedt's work.

In 2024, Hustvedt received the Openbank Literature Award by Vanity Fair for her literary career.

In 2025, Hustvedt was awarded the Prix de la Principauté by the Prince Pierre Foundation (presided over by Princess Caroline of Monaco) and Les Rencontres Philosophiques de Monaco (presided over by Charlotte Casiraghi, the princess's daughter) for her entire body of work. She gave the laureate address on "Betweens" at the Théâtre des Variétés in Monaco on 17 October 2025.

== Personal life ==
Hustvedt met her husband, writer Paul Auster, in 1981, and they married the following year. They lived together in Brooklyn, New York, until his death in 2024. Their daughter, Sophie Auster (born 1987), is a singer/songwriter and actress.

In 2009, Hustvedt signed a petition in support of director Roman Polanski, calling for his release after his arrest in Switzerland in relation to his 1977 charge for statutory rape.

== Books ==
=== Poetry ===
- Reading to You (1983)

=== Fiction ===
- The Blindfold (1992)
- The Enchantment of Lily Dahl (1996)
- What I Loved (2003)
- The Sorrows of an American (2008)
- The Summer Without Men (2011)
- The Blazing World (2014)
- Memories of the Future (2019)

=== Nonfiction ===
- Yonder (1998)
- Mysteries of the Rectangle: Essays on Painting (2005)
- A Plea for Eros (2005)
- The Shaking Woman or A History of My Nerves (2009)
- Living, Thinking, Looking (2012)
- A Woman Looking at Men Looking at Women – Essays (2016)
- Mothers, Fathers, and Others - Essays Simon & Schuster (December 7, 2021), ISBN 978-1-9821-7639-6
- Ghost Stories (2026)

=== Translation ===
- Kjetsaa, Geir. Fyodor Dostoyevsky: A Writer's Life, translated by Siri Hustvedt and David McDuff (1998)
- Six poems by Tor Ulven from Vanishing Point. Writ, no. 18, 1986.

=== Translation editor ===
- Fragments for a History of the Human Body, edited by Michel Feher, Ramona Naddaff, and Nadia Tazi (1989)

=== Original foreign book publications ===
- Embodied Visions: What Does it Mean to Look at a Work of Art?, bilingual edition English-German, published as part of a series of the annual Schelling Lectures delivered at the Akademie der Bildenden Künste in Munich; Deutscher Kunst Verlag, 2010
- The Eight Voyages of Sinbad, published in Spanish Ocho Viajes Con Simbad with photographs by Reza. Madrid: La Fabrica, 2011. French edition by Actes Sud, 2011

== Publications in journals and anthologies ==
=== Poems ===
- "Weather Markings." The Paris Review 81(1981): 136–137 Reprinted. The Paris Review Anthology. Ed. George Plimpton. New York: Norton, 1990. 582–5833.
- "Broken Geometry." Pequod 12 (1981): 69–73.
- "Eclipse," "Hermaphroditic Parallels." The Paris Review 87 (1983): 129–130.
- "Haiku" (on Chardin). Art Issues, Summer (2000).
- "Nine Boxes." A Convergence of Birds: Original Fiction and Poetry Inspired by the Work of Joseph Cornell. Ed., Jonathan Safran Foer. New York: D.A.P., 2001. 93–98.

=== Stories ===
- "Mr. Morning." Ontario Review 30 (1989): 80–98.

Reprinted in The Best American Short Stories 1990. Ed. Richard Ford. New York: Houghton Mifflin, 1990. 105–126. Also reprinted in The Literary Insomniac: Stories and Essays for Sleepless Nights. Eds. Elyse Cheney and Wendy Hubbert. New York: Doubleday, 1996. 20–48.

- "Houdini." Fiction 9 (1990): 144–162. Reprinted in Best American Short Stories 1991. Ed. Alice Adams. New York: Houghton Mifflin, 1991. 209–227.

=== Essays on visual art ===
- "Vermeer's Annunciation." Modern Painters, Spring, 1996.
- "Ghosts at the Table." Modern Painters, Summer, 1997.
- "Not Just Bottles" (on Giorgio Morandi). Modern Painters, Winter, 1998.

Reprinted: The Penguin Book of Art Writing. Eds. Karen Wright and Martin Gayford, 1999. Reprinted in Writers on Artists, London: DK, 2001.

- "The Man with the Red Crayon" (on Chardin). Modern Painters, Spring, 2000.
- "Double Exposure" (on Gerhard Richter). Modern Painters, Summer, 2002.
- "Heaven's Alphabet" (on Russian avant-garde book exhibition at MoMA) Art on Paper, July, August 2002.
- "Remembering in Color" (on Joan Mitchell). Modern Painters, Autumn, 2002.
- "The Pleasures of Bewilderment" (on Giorgione). The Yale Review 91 (2003): 85–93.
- "Finding Goya's Head." Modern Painters. Winter, 2003.
- "Necessary Leaps" (catalogue essay). Richard Allen Morris: Retrospective 1958–2004. Museum Haus Lange. Krefeld, Germany: 2004. Reprinted in Modern Painters. Winter, 2004.
- "Duccio di Buoninsegna at the Met." "La Vierge et l'Enfant." Nouvelle Observateur. August 18, 2005.
- "Goya's Bodies: The Living, the Dead, and the Ghostly." The Yale Review 93 (2005): 34–59.
- "Old Pictures" (on photography) Modern Painters, Fall, 2005.
- "Insides Out" (on Kiki Smith). Modern Painters, 2006. Revised version for catalogue essay, "Kiki Smith: Bound and Unbound,"Kiki Smith: Wellspring, Repères, Cahiers d'art contemporain, no. 139, Galerie Lelong, Paris, 2007.
- "The Places that Scare You" (on Louise Bourgeois) The Guardian, October 6, 2007.
- "Why Goya" published in Spanish as "Francisco de Goya o los equivos." Fundacion Amigos Museo del Prado (2008)
- "The Enchanted and Demonic World of Annette Messager" The Guardian, February 21, 2009.
- "Truth and Rightness" (catalogue essay for Gerhard Richter). Gerhard Richter: Overpainted Photographs, ed. Markus Heinselmann, Hatje Cantz, 2009.
- "The Drama of Perception: Looking at Morandi." The Yale Review 97 (2009).
- "Embodied Visions: What Does it Mean to Look at a Work of Art," The Yale Review 98 (2010).
- "Margaret Bowland's Theatrum Mundi," catalogue essay for Excerpts from the Great American Songbook, Babcock Galleries, New York, and the Greenville County Museum of Art (2011).
- "A Woman Looking at Men Looking at Women." Catalogue essay for Frauen: Picasso, Beckmann, de Kooning at Pinakothek der Moderne. Munich (2012)
- "Anselm Kiefer: The Truth is Always Gray." Essay for catalogue of the Eli Broad Collection of Art in Los Angeles (2013).

=== Essays on various subjects ===
- "Gatsby's Glasses." Conjunctions: 29. Tributes: American Writers on American Writers, (1997): 265–275.
- "A Plea for Eros." Brick, 1997. Reprinted in The Art of the Essay: The Best of 1999. Ed. Philip Lopate. New York: Random House, 1999.
- "Franklin Pangborn: An Apologia." O.K. You Mugs: Writers on Movie Actors. Eds. Luc Sante and Melissa Pierson. New York: Granta Books, 1999. Reprinted as essay for The Criterion Collection (film).
- Essay on Bohumil Hrabel's I Served the King of England. Lost Classics: Writers on Books Loved and Lost. Eds. Michael Ondaatje, Michael Redhill, Linda and Esta Spalding. London: Bloomsbury, 2001.
- "The World Trade Center." 110 Stories: New York Writers After September 11. Ed. Ulrich Baer. New York: New York University Press, 2002.
- "Being a Man." Conjunctions 41, Two Kingdoms: The Dualism Issue (2003) 71–76.
- "Extracts from a Story of the Wounded Self." Samtiden (Norway), November 2004.
- "Some Musings on the Word Scandinavia," Lettre Internationale, Denmark: 08, 2005.
- Introduction. "Personal and Impersonal Words." Henry James, The Bostonians. New York: Barnes and Nobles Classics, 2005.
- "Look Away." New York Stories: The Best of the City Section of The New York Times. New York: New York University Press, 2005. 135–138.
- "Variations on Desire: A Mouse, A Dog, Buber, and Bovary." Conjunctions 41 (2007) 213–221.
- "My Father Myself." Granta 104 (2008): 56–75.
- "My Inger Christensen," Jyllands Posten (Denmark) January 8, 2009. Reprinted in Poetry, May 2009.
- "Excursions to the Islands of the Happy Few" (on expert culture). Philoctetes: The Journal of the Philoctetes Center for the Multidisciplinary Study of the Imagination, vol.1 2007. Reprinted in Salmagundi, no. 166–167; Spring Summer 2010.
- "Reflections on a More or Less Hidden Being." Contemporary Psychoanalysis 46: Special Issue on Psychoanalysis and the Media (2010): 224–234.
- "Stig Dagerman." Foreword to The Snake, Ormen, Norstedts Forlag, Sweden, 2010.
- "The Real Story." Salmagundi, nos. 170–171, Spring Summer (2012): 35–53.
- "Three Emotional Stories: Reflections on Memory, the Imagination, Narrative and the Self. Neuropsychoanalysis 13 (2), 2011 (with peer review: Vittorio Gallese, dept. of neuroscience, University of Parma and Richard Kessler, Adults and Children with Learning Disabilities, Inc. New York)
- "Flashbacks" The New York Times, Sunday Review, February 18, 2012
- "Freud's Playground" Salmagundi, nos. 174–175, Spring Summer (2012): 59–78.
- "On Reading." Columbia: 49, (2011).
- "Philosophy Matters in Brain Matters" Seizure: European Journal of Epilepsy 22 (2013) 169–173.
- "Underground Sexism: What was that you just said?" In Fifty Shades of Feminism. Eds. Lisa Appignanesi, Rachel Holmes, and Susie Orbach. London: Virago, 2013.

== Lectures and conversations ==
- Guest lecturer at the New York Studio School: 2000, 2003, and 2007.
- "When the Protaganist [sic] is a Psychoanalyst: An Exploration of the Relationship Between Psychoanalysis and Literature" Fifth Annual Lecture, The Friends of the Newman Library, Baruch College with the Postgraduate Center for Mental Health Library Advisory Committee. November 4, 2005.
- Portland Arts & Lectures. Conversation with Paul Auster, January 24, 2006.
- Gallery talk on Kiki Smith. The Walker Art Center, Minneapolis, March 9, 2006
- "Looking at Painting." Museo de Arte Latinoamericano de Buenos Aires: MALBA, Buenos Aires, Argentina. April 7, 2006
- "The Drama of Perception: Looking at Morandi." Sunday Lectures at the Met. Metropolitan Museum of Art, New York City. September 21, 2008.
- Conversation with psychoanalyst Beverley Zabriskie about Jung's Red Book. The Red Book Dialogues. The Rubin Museum of Art. New York City, October 26, 2009.
- "Embodied Visions: What Does it Mean to Look at a Work of Art?" The Third Annual Schelling Lecture. Akademie der Bildenden Künste (The Academy of Fine Arts) in Munich, Germany. January 27, 2010.
- Conversation with the Harvard neuroscientist Hans Breiter. Brain Wave series at Rubin Museum of Art. March 10, 2010.
- Inaugural lecture in series: Neuro Culture: Body and Brain in Cultural Perspective. CUNY Graduate Center for the Study of Women and Society. New York City, September 28, 2010.
- "Three Emotional Stories", a lecture given at Pain, Poetry and Perception: A Symposium on the Convergence of Neuroscience, Literature, and Psychoanalysis at Georgetown University. Jointly sponsored by The Baltimore Washington Center for Psychoanalysis and the Department of Psychiatry Georgetown University Hospital. (With Joseph LeDoux and Michael Jasnow) Georgetown University. October 30, 2010.
- "Borderlands: First, Second, and Third Person Adventures in Crossing Disciplines" Keynote lecture for Gutenberg Fellowship. Gutenberg University, Mainz, Germany, June 4, 2012.
- "Philosophy Matters in Brain Matters." Lecture at International Neuroethics Conference. Brain Matters 3. Cleveland, Ohio. October 24, 2012.
- "I Wept for Four Years and When I Stopped I was Blind." Keynote lecture for Réunion d'Hiver de la Societé de Neurophysiologie Clinique de Langue Française: Neurophysiologie de L'hystérie. Paris, January 21, 2012.
- "Kierkegaard's Pseudonyms and the Truths of Fiction." Keynote Lecture at International Kierkegaard Conference at Ceremonial Hall, the University of Copenhagen, May 6, 2013.
- "Embodied Visions: What Does it Mean to Look at a Work of Art?" The Third Annual Schelling Lecture. Akademie der Bildenden Künste, Munich. January 27, 2010.

== Criticism ==
=== Books ===
- Johanna Hartmann, Literary Visuality in Siri Hustvedt's Work: Phenomenological Perspectives (Wurtsburg: Konigshausen and Neumann, 2016).
- Johanna Hartmann, Christine Marks, and Hubert Zapf, Zones of Focused Ambiguity in Siri Hustvedt Works: Interdisciplinary Essays (Berlin: De Gruyter, 2016).
- Christine Marks, I am Because You Are: Relationality in the Work of Siri Hustvedt (Winter: Heidelberg University Press, 2014).
- Corinna Sophie Reipen, Visuality in the Works of Siri Hustvedt (New York: Peter Lang, 2014).

=== Selected articles ===
- Asbjorn Gronstad. "Ekphrasis Refigured: Writing Seeing in Siri Hustvedt's What I Loved," Mosaic, vol. 45, issue 3 (2012).
- Alexandra Hanover. "Here and There." Photographs by Bettina Pittaluga. Revue Passager, Issue number 3. ISBN 9782959589027.
- Elizabeth Lowry. "Siri Hustvedt: LIVING, THINKING, LOOKING." TLS. Times Literary Supplement, no. 5705 (2012): 26. Gale In Context: Literature (accessed June 23, 2026).
- Alise Jameson. "Pleasure and Peril: Dynamic Forces of Power and Desire in Siri Hustvedt's The Blindfold," Studies in the Novel, vol. 42, issue 4 (2010).
- Christian Knirsch, "In a Time Warp: The Issue of Chronology in Siri Hustvedt's The Blindfold," Current Objectives of Postgraduate American Studies, vol. 11 (2010): (no pagination).
- Christian Knirsch, "The Story of a Migraineur: Black Holes in Siri Hustvedt's The Blindfold
- Elizabeth Kovac, "Violated Securities: Symptoms of a Post 9/11 Zeitgeist in Siri Hustvedt's The Sorrows of an American,' in eTransfers: A Postgraduate ejournal for Comparative Literature and Cultural Studies, issue 2 (2012).
- Kevin Nance. "Memory and Ms. Hyde: in her fifth novel, the summer without men, Siri Hustvedt draws on her fascination with memory and all things cerebral to spin a twisted tale of love and marriage." Poets & Writers Magazine 39, no. 3 (2011): 34+. Gale In Context: Literature (accessed June 23, 2026).
- Caroline Rosenthal, "The Inadequacy of Symbolic Surfaces: Urban Space, Art and Corporeality in Siri Hustvedt's What I Loved," in ed. Caroline Rosenthal, New York and Toronto Novels after Postmodernism Explorations of the Urban (Rochester, N.Y: Camden House, 2011), 73–122.
- Henderikus J. Stam, "The Neurosciences and the Search for a Unified Psychology: The Science and Aesthetics of a Single Framework," Frontiers in Psychology 6 (2015):1467.
- Anna Thiemann "Shaking Patterns of Diagnosis: Siri Hustvedt and Charlotte Perkins Gilman," in Carmen Birkle and Johanna Heil, eds., Communication Disease: Cultural Representations of American Medicine (Winter: Heidelberg, 2013), 365–386.
- Hubert Zapf, "Narrative, Ethics, and Post Modern Art in Siri Hustvedt's What I Loved," in Astrid Erll, Hubert Grabes and Ansgar Nunning, eds., Ethics in Culture: The Dissemination of Values through Literature and Other Media (Berlin: de Gruyter), 171–196.
- Gianna Zocco."The Art of Watching: The Literary Motif of the Window and its Potential for Meta Fiction in Contemporary Literature, Trans revue de literature generals et compare, 16 (2013).

== Sources ==
- Bronfen, Elisabeth. "Gendering Curiosity: The Double Games of Siri Hustvedt, Paul Auster and Sophie Calle." In Bi-Textualität: Inszenierungen des Paares, edited by Annegret Heitmann et al. Berlin: Schmidt, 2000, 283–302.
- Ljungberg, Christina. "Triangular Strategies: Cross-Mapping the Curious Spaces of Siri Hustvedt, Paul Auster and Sophie Calle." In Mapping Liminalities: Thresholds in Cultural and Literary Texts, edited by Lucy Kay et al. Bern: Lang, 2007, 111–35. Google Books.
- Marks, Christine. "I am because you are": Relationality in the Works of Siri Hustvedt. Heidelberg: Winter, 2014.
- Marks, Christine. "Hysteria, Doctor-Patient Relations, and Identity Boundaries in Siri Hustvedt's What I Loved." Gender Forum. An Internet Journal for Gender Studies 25 (2009). Online journal.
- Öhlschläger, Claudia. Die unsägliche Lust des Schauens: Die Konstruktion der Geschechter im voyeurischen Text. Freiberg im Breisgau: Rombach, 1996.
- Wegener, Susanne. "Die 'Kulturelle Initiation' der Lily Dahl: Identität in Siri Hustvedt's The Enchantment of Lily Dahl." PhiN: Philologie im Netz 32 (2005): 50–67.
- Zapf, Hubert. "Narrative, Ethics, and Postmodern Art in Siri Hustvedt's What I Loved." In Ethics in Culture: The Dissemination of Values through Literature and Other Media, edited by Astrid Erll, Herbert Grabes and Angsar Nünning. Berlin: de Gruyter, 2008, 171–94.
- Zapf, Hubert. "Trauma, Narrative and Ethics in Recent American Fiction." Other People's Pain: Narratives of Trauma and the Question of Ethics, edited by Martin Modlinger and Phillip Sonntag. Berlin: Peter Lang AG, 2011.
