= Toy Love =

New Zealand new wave/punk rock band

- Origin: Dunedin, New Zealand
- Genres: Alternative rock, punk rock, new wave
- Years active: 1978–1980
- Past members: Chris Knox; Alec Bathgate; Paul Kean; Mike Dooley; Jane Walker

Toy Love were a New Zealand new wave and punk rock band that originated in Dunedin and was active from 1978 to 1980. Members included Chris Knox, Alec Bathgate and Paul Kean. They achieved significant chart success in their home country, with three top 30 singles and an album that peaked at number four.

== History ==
Chris Knox was the band's front man and other members were guitarist Alec Bathgate, bass player Paul Kean, drummer Mike Dooley, and keyboard player Jane Walker. The band developed out of the earlier punk band The Enemy from Dunedin, and are often regarded as the progenitors of the Dunedin sound movement. Toy Love were together for less than two years (1978–1980) and spent a large part of that time in Australia.

Based in Sydney, ostensibly as a staging post to reaching the UK and a wider audience, Knox summed up his bitterness about the experience in a frank interview shown on Radio with Pictures. The band were unhappy with their management, touring schedule and recording arrangements. By the time they took a "break" (which was actually the end of the band), they had played 337 gigs in 18 months, but had barely found the time to write new material.

They released just one, self-titled album, a significant number of its tracks written as The Enemy. The band members were apparently appalled by the mixing of the album, which took the edge off the band's deliberately raw sound.

Nonetheless, the Toy Love album was a hit in New Zealand, reaching number four in the album charts, and the band returned from Australia to a tour of their home country, packing out venues and garnering positive write-ups. According to their profile in AudioCulture, music journalist and record store owner Roy Colbert called them "The Stooges with Beatles melodies", and described the album as "a collection of post-punk power, pure pop, macabre melodrama, whoop n' holler bizarre bop, sublime ice-cold beauty, three-chord thunder [and] chaotic psychedelia, [...] "pegging the slower, more dramatic songs as better realised, while noting a good take on three-chord punk perennial 'Pull Down the Shades', and exciting new material, including 'Bedroom'."

In April 2005, the album was remastered and released along with a number of demos and unreleased tracks as a double CD entitled Cuts. In 2012, a further compilation, simply titled Toy Love, was released on double LP, containing all singles, b-sides, compilation tracks, demos and some live recordings (this has the same front cover artwork as Cuts).

After Toy Love broke up, Bathgate and Knox remained together as the Tall Dwarfs. Kean was later a member of The Bats.

In 2012, Toy Love was inducted into the New Zealand Music Hall of Fame and given the Legacy Award at the Vodafone New Zealand Music Awards.

Jane Walker died in October 2018; her death was announced by Flying Nun Records on Twitter.

== Discography ==
=== Studio albums ===
List of studio albums, with New Zealand chart positions
Title	Album details	Peak chart positions
Title	Album details	NZ
Toy Love	Released: August 1980; Label: Deluxe Records, WEA (Z 20008); Format: LP, Cassette	4

=== Live albums ===
List of live albums, with New Zealand chart positions
Title	Album details	Peak chart positions
Title	Album details	NZ
Live At The Gluepot	Released: April 2012; Label: Real Groovy Records (RGLP 001); Format: 2xLP, 2xCD; Recorded September 1980 at Ponsonby, Auckland, NZ	11

=== Compilation albums ===
List of compilation albums, with New Zealand chart positions
Title	Album details	Peak chart positions
Title	Album details	NZ
Cuts	Released: April 2005; Label: Flying Nun Records (FNCD473); Format: 2xCD	23
Toy Love	Released: 3 November 2012; Label: Flying Nun Records (FNLP528/FNCT001); Format: 2xLP	

=== Extended Plays ===
List of EPs
Title	Details
Toy Love	Released: 1980; Label: Deluxe Records (20630); Format: 7"

=== Singles ===
List of singles with selected New Zealand positions
Title	Year	Peak chart positions	Album
Title	Year	NZ	Album
1979	"Rebel" / "Squeeze"	29	Toy Love (EP)
1980	"Don't Ask Me"	10	Toy Love
1980	"Bride of Frankenstein"	22	Toy Love

== Awards ==
=== Aotearoa Music Awards ===
The Aotearoa Music Awards (previously known as New Zealand Music Awards (NZMA)) are an annual awards night celebrating excellence in New Zealand music and have been presented annually since 1965.

Year	Nominee / work	Award	Result	Ref.
2012	Toy Love	New Zealand Music Hall of Fame	inductee	
