= Fifty Flavours of Glue =

Studio album by Tall Dwarfs
- Released: 1998
- Length: 49:30
- Label: Flying Nun Records

Tall Dwarfs chronology
Gluey, Gluey and The Ear Friend (1996)	Fifty Flavours of Glue (1998)	The Sky Above the Mud Below (2002)

Fifty Flavours of Glue is an album by New Zealand band Tall Dwarfs, released in 1998. It was released with the label number FN412.

== Singles ==
"Gluey, Gluey and The Ear Friend" was released in 1998, containing the "Gluey Gluey" single and "The Ear Friend" EP.

== Music videos ==
"Gluey Gluey" and "Fragile" were the two singles released as music videos.

== Track listing ==
1. "Gluey Gluey" (2:34)
2. "The Communion" (2:03)
3. "If I Were A Piece of Shit" (1:53)
4. "Like Someone Else" (3:27)
5. "Baby" (1:41)
6. "The Fatal Flaw of the New" (3:22)
7. "The Ugly Mire of Deep Held Feelings" (2:21)
8. "Endure" (4:59)
9. "The Future See" (2:27)
10. "Just Do It!" (3:15)
11. "Mistaken: Once Again" (2:27)
12. "Fatty Fowl in Gravy Stew" (2:40)
13. "Round These Walls" (2:06)
14. "Fragile" (3:37)
15. "Totalitarian Chant of Freedom" (2:53)
16. "Smacked" (3:10)
17. "Over the Hill" (1:41)
