= Not Given Lightly =

Single by Chris Knox

from the album Seizure
- A-side: "Not Given Lightly"
- B-side: "Guppiplus EP"
- Released: 1989
- Recorded: February 1989 at Lab Studios, Auckland
- Genre: Indie rock
- Length: 5:06
- Label: Flying Nun
- Songwriter: Chris Knox

"Not Given Lightly" is a song by New Zealand singer-songwriter Chris Knox. It was released in 1989 and is among Knox's best known songs. While the song did not chart when originally released in 1989, it has since become well known from its use in New Zealand film and television productions, especially in a television advertisement for Vogel's bread in 2007.

In 2001 the song was placed in 13th in the APRA Top 100 New Zealand Songs of All Time list, as voted by New Zealand members of the Australasian Performing Right Association (APRA). The song then featured on the Nature's Best album of the top 30 tracks.

== Background and writing ==
The song was written as a heartfelt love song about Knox's then partner Barbara Ward. The lyrics refer to Ward and the couple's two children with the line "This is a love song for John and Liesha's mother". The song's title and main refrain comes from a lyric in The Velvet Underground song "Venus in Furs" - "Taste the whip, in love not given lightly". The song is performed in Chris Knox's trademark solo style - simple percussion loops with clean and distorted guitar.

== Music video ==
The music video was directed by Chris Knox and shot at his home in Grey Lynn, Auckland. The video starts with an extreme close-up of Knox's face, slowly zooming out over the duration of the song to reveal Knox surrounded by his friends and family. Edits are done on the beat. The video is shot in both black-and-white and colour, with most of the black-and-white footage used at the beginning of the video and most of the colour footage used at the end.

== Track listings ==
NZ 12" (FN127) 1989

1. "Not Given Lightly" (Knox) — 5:05
2. "Wanna Die With You" (Bathgate, Dawson, Dooley, Knox) — 2:45
3. "Sandfly" (Knox) — 2:44
4. "Jane And John" (Knox) — 2:11
5. "More Or Less (Lethargy)" (Knox) — 2:50
6. "Jesus Loves You" (Knox) — 2:20
7. "Me And The Insects" (Knox) — 1:37
8. "1954" (Knox) — 1:38
9. "Indigestion" (Knox) — 2:39
10. "Over And Out" (Knox) — 3:27
11. "Justification Song" (Knox) — 1:43
- Side A plays on 45 rpm, side B plays on 33 rpm

NZ 12", 10" (FN152), cassette (FNMC152) 1990

1. "Not Given Lightly" (Knox) — 5:05
2. "Face Of Fashion" (Knox) — 2:54
3. "Love Song (Part 1)" (Knox) —

US 10" EP (COMM 26-1) 1993

1. "Not Given Lightly"
2. "Filling Me"
3. "Uncle Tom's Cabin"
4. "And I Will Cry"
5. "Voyeur"
6. "A Song Of The Only Child"
- Side A plays on 45 rpm, side B plays on 33 rpm

== Production credits ==
- Engineer: Glenn Eisenhutt
- Recorded at: The Lab, Symonds Street, Auckland
- Written by: Chris Knox
- Vocals: Chris Knox
- Performer (all backings): Chris Knox

== Charts ==
The song has never charted in the Official New Zealand Music Chart top 40, but has twice appeared in the New Zealand artists' singles top 20 chart. In August 2012 it charted at number 17 and again in June 2013 at number 16.

== Certifications ==
Region	Certification	Certified units/sales
New Zealand (RMNZ)	Gold	15,000^{‡}
^{‡} Sales+streaming figures based on certification alone.

== Cover versions ==
- Australian band Frente! included a cover on their 1993 EP Labour of Love.
- American punk band J Church covered it in 1995 on their EP Lama Temple.
- Austrian musician B. Fleischmann covered the song on the 2009 tribute album Not Given Lightly: A Tribute To The Giant Golden Book Of New Zealands Alternative Music Scene.
- Boh Runga covered it on the 2009 album Stroke - Songs for Chris Knox, the tribute and fundraising album in honour of Chris Knox.
- It was covered in 2012 as an all-star charity record in association with the New Zealand Breast Cancer Foundation to raise awareness of breast cancer.
- In 2013 New Zealand The X Factor contestant Benny Tipene performed the song on the New-Zealand-music-themed episode, which then saw the original enter the New Zealand artists chart at number 16.
- The original version of the song has also appeared on several compilation albums: the Topless Women Talk About Their Lives soundtrack (1997), the closing track on the Flying Nun 10th anniversary album Getting Older 1981–1991 (1991) and on the Nature's Best album of the top 30 New Zealand songs, as voted by APRA New Zealand members (2002).
