= Memories of the Future (novel) =

2019 novel by Siri Hustvedt

- First edition (US)
- Author: Siri Hustvedt
- Language: English
- Publisher: Simon & Schuster (US); Sceptre (UK)
- Publication place: United States

Memories of the Future is a 2019 novel by American writer Siri Hustvedt. The novel concerns a narrator, known as S.H. or by her nickname, "Minnesota", who discovers her journal from 40 years before the novel's events.

== Writing and development ==
Hustvedt has said she "[...] actively [hoped] to undermine" the assumption that autobiographical fiction by women tends to be less imaginative than equivalent works by men.

== Style and contents ==
The novel contains autobiographical elements. Writing for the New York Times, Judith Shulevitz referred to the novel as an example of autofiction. The novel contains drawings by Hustvedt of several men, including Marcel Duchamp and Donald Trump.

== Reception ==
=== Critical reception ===
In a review for The Financial Times, Catherine Taylor compared the work to the "best" of the filmography of American director David Lynch. Critics highlighted Hustvedt's depiction of New York City, with Sam Sacks crediting the depiction of S.H.'s relationship with a neighbor, Lucy, as accurate to the experience of living in a large city. In her review for The Guardian, Sarah Crown praised the inclusion of the city, writing that Hustvedt "joyously depicts" New York as "hot, dirty and cacophonous".

Writing for The Los Angeles Review of Books, Elena Goukassian compared Memories of the Future unfavorably to Hustvedt's debut novel, The Blindfold. Goukassian praised The Blindfold for "leaving readers to draw [their] own conclusions" while writing that Memories of the Future "suffers from over-explanation". Goukassian attributes this tendency to the "Trump era", during which she writes that there "[...] appears to be a wider trend among writers and artists of all kinds in creating works that drill their themes into the minds of their audiences".

=== Accolades ===
The novel was long-listed for the 2020 Andrew Carnegie Medals for Excellence in Fiction and Nonfiction.
