= Throw a Sickie =

EP by Tall Dwarfs
- Released: 1986
- Length: 21:01
- Label: Flying Nun Records FNSICK1

Tall Dwarfs chronology
That's the Short and Long of It (1985)	Throw a Sickie (1986)	Dogma (1987)

Professional ratings
Review scores
Source	Rating
Allmusic	3/5 stars

Throw a Sickie is a 12" EP by New Zealand band Tall Dwarfs, released in 1986.

== Track listing ==
1. "Underhand" - 1:50
2. "Road & Hedgehog" - 1:42
3. "Attack of the Munchies" - 3:40
4. "Come Inside" - 2:27
5. "The Universality Of Neighbourliness" - 0:57
6. "The Big Dive" 3:06
7. "No Place" 1:22
8. "And Other Kinds" 3:45
9. "Farewell" - 2:12
