= Gluey, Gluey and The Ear Friend =

"Gluey, Gluey and the Ear Friend"

Single by Tall Dwarfs

from the album Fifty Flavours of Glue
- Released: 1998
- Label: Flying Nun

Tall Dwarfs singles chronology
"Stumpy" (1996)	"Gluey, Gluey and the Ear Friend" (1998)	"Fifty Flavours of Glue" (1998)

"Gluey, Gluey and the Ear Friend" is a single by New Zealand rock band Tall Dwarfs, released in 1998 with label number FN403. It contains the "Gluey Gluey" single and "The Ear Friend" EP.

== Track listings ==
=== Gluey Gluey single ===
1. "Gluey Gluey (Single Mix)"

=== The Ear Friend EP ===
1. "Ice Breaker"
2. "Fragile (Guitar! Mix)"
3. "The Ear Friend (Trailer)"
4. "Foolish Hearts"
5. "The Ear Friend"
