= Weeville =

Studio album by Tall Dwarfs
- Released: 1990
- Genres: Indie pop, indie rock, lo-fi
- Length: 46:14
- Labels: Flying Nun; Homestead

Tall Dwarfs chronology
Hello Cruel World (1986)	Weeville (1990)	Fork Songs (1991)

Weeville is an album by New Zealand band Tall Dwarfs, released in 1990. It was the band's first album, after almost a decade of EP-only releases.

The album was reissued, along with Fork Songs, in 2005 by Cloud Recordings. The band toured the United States to promote the reissue.

== Production ==
The album was made possible by a grant from the New Zealand Arts Council.

== Critical reception ==
Professional ratings
Review scores
Source	Rating
AllMusic	3/5 stars
The Encyclopedia of Popular Music	4/5 stars
MusicHound Rock: The Essential Album Guide	3/5 stars
Philadelphia Weekly	A
Pitchfork	7.0/10
Spin Alternative Record Guide	9/10
Winnipeg Sun	3.5/5 stars

Trouser Press called the album "unpretentious but insidiously great." Exclaim! wrote that "the songs that endure are acoustically strummed with simple arrangements." The Chicago Tribune labeled it "a Sgt. Pepper of low-tech innovation." Philadelphia Weekly noted that "Weeville also underscores just how profoundly the Kiwi scene affected America's Elephant 6 collective, which took that affinity for pretty/ugly experimentation to dizzying heights." The Winnipeg Sun deemed the band "lo-fi psych-pop pioneers."

== Track listing ==
1. "Lag"
2. "What More"
3. "Breath"
4. "Skin of My Teeth"
5. "Crawl"
6. "Sign the Dotted Line"
7. "Pirouette"
8. "Lucky"
9. "Bodies"
10. "Mr. Broccoli"
11. "Lie"
12. "The Winner"
13. "Rorschach"
14. "Tip of My Tongue"
15. "Ozone"
16. "Hallelujah Boy"
