= That's the Short and Long of It =

EP by Tall Dwarfs
- Released: 1985
- Label: Flying Nun Records – LONG 1

Tall Dwarfs chronology
Slugbucket Hairybreath Monster (1984)	That's the Short and Long of It (1985)	Throw a Sickie (1986)

Professional ratings
Review scores
Source	Rating
AllMusic	3/5 stars

That's the Short and Long of It is an EP by New Zealand band Tall Dwarfs, released in 1985.

== Reception ==
Spin said, "With sparse, careful production, each track takes on an otherwordly identity. Nothing pretentious, pompous, or theatrical, even though the Dwarfs practically have an orchestra within the band. It has a delicate atmosphere that seems lifted from old Beatles LPs."

== Track listing ==
Side A

1. "Nothing's Going To Happen" - 06:05
2. "Nothing's Going To Stop It" - 06:18

Side B

1. "The Hills Are Alive" - 02:04
2. "Clover (Take 1)" - 01:48
3. "Pretty Poison" - 01:53
4. "Sleet" - 02:07
5. "Burning Blue" - 02:57
6. "Carpetgrabber" - 02:03
7. "Gone To The Worms" - 02:20
8. "Woman (Live 84)" - 04:40
9. "Get Outta The Garage" - 02:56
10. "Scrapbook" - 01:45
