= Chris Knox =

New Zealand musician, composer, illustrator, writer

- Also known as: Friend
- Born: Christopher Alexander Knox; 2 September 1952 (age 74); Invercargill, New Zealand
- Origin: Dunedin, New Zealand
- Genres: Indie rock, punk rock
- Occupations: Singer, songwriter, guitarist, multi-instrumentalist, producer, writer, reviewer, filmmaker, cartoonist, visual artist
- Instruments: Vocals, guitar
- Years active: 1977–present
- Label: Flying Nun

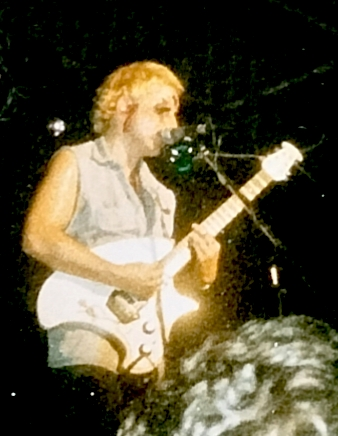
Chris Knox performing solo, circa 1989, at Otago University, Dunedin, New Zealand

Christopher Alexander Knox (born 2 September 1952) is a New Zealand musician, cartoonist and movie reviewer who emerged during the 1970s punk rock era with his bands the Enemy and Toy Love. After Toy Love disbanded in the early 1980s, Knox formed the duo Tall Dwarfs with guitarist Alec Bathgate. The Tall Dwarfs delivered unpolished sound and intense live shows. His 4-track machine was used to record most of the Flying Nun label's early singles.

He has also released a number of solo, self-produced albums which feature his Casiotone, and an album under the pseudonym Friend.

== Biography ==
Knox began his musical career in 1977 as a "local version (not copy) of Iggy Pop", as lead vocalist, fronting New Zealand's punk rockers the Enemy, which formed in Dunedin. He has played live in front of audiences all around New Zealand, winning a reputation for his sometimes confrontational style, and performed annually at Wellington's Bar Bodega. He has also extensively toured internationally. His swing through the US in 1995 included, among others, stops in Seattle to play the Crocodile Cafe. His minimalist, DIY sound played well to ears then-focused on grunge, with its retro-punk stylings.

A long-time resident of Auckland, Knox spent time as a newspaper columnist and film reviewer for Real Groove. In 1986-1987, he edited and published three issues of a New Zealand comics anthology Jesus on a Stick. Starting in 1987, his satirical comic strip Max Media appeared in The New Zealand Herald every week until 2009. He has also been an occasional television film reviewer, hosted a Television New Zealand season of classic movies 'The Vault', and presented two seasons of arts series New Artland.

At the 2001 New Zealand Music Awards Knox's ballad "Not Given Lightly" (1990) was announced as New Zealand's thirteenth best song of all time, as voted by APRA members. Knox wrote it for "John and Liesha's mother"—his then-partner Barbara—this track never scaled commercial heights though it has belatedly generated some income for the songwriter through its use in TV advertising (including for Vogel's bread).

Knox launched his own label 'A Major Records' in 2006 to release the album Chris Knox and the Nothing. This was the first album Knox recorded in a professional studio, rather than in his trademark DIY style, since his time with Toy Love.

Knox's "It's Love", from the 2000 album Beat, has been used in "Share the Good", a Heineken Premium Light commercial directed by Todd Haynes and cinematographed by Edward Lachman.

In 2009 Knox was awarded a New Zealand Arts Foundation Arts Laureate Award.

On 11 June 2009 Knox was admitted to Auckland Hospital suffering from a stroke. The album Stroke: Songs for Chris Knox was released in New Zealand on 16 November 2009. It features 33 artists performing Knox's songs. The album is a way for Knox's fans to contribute to the costs of his rehabilitation. All artists contributed their time and talent without charge. Artists include Jay Reatard, David Kilgour, The Mint Chicks, Shayne Carter, Yo La Tengo, Bonnie 'Prince' Billy, Bill Callahan, The Mountain Goats, The Bats, The Chills, The Verlaines, Jeff Mangum, The Nothing (including Chris), Tall Dwarfs and Lou Barlow.

The Greenwich Village arts venue Le Poisson Rouge hosted a benefit concert for Knox on 6 May 2010. Artists included Jeff Mangum and Yo La Tengo, who both participated in the 2009 benefit album for Knox.

Since his stroke, Knox has done a very small number of live appearances, for instance at the presentation of Stroke – Songs For Chris Knox in November 2009, on 22 April 2012, on 29 September 2012 in Auckland, with Rackets, as Knoxious and in support of Neutral Milk Hotel on 23 and 24 of November, 2013.

In October 2025, Auckland University Press published a biography of Chris Knox, written by US-based author and academic Craig Robertson, who received Knox's blessing for the project before his stroke. Titled 'Chris Knox: Not Given Lightly', it runs to 455 pages, making extensive use of archive material, interviews and Knox's own work.

== Discography ==
=== LPs ===
Year	Title	Details	Peak chart positions
Year	Title	Details	NZ
1981	Songs for Cleaning Guppies	Label: Flying Nun; Catalogue: ME 1	—
1988	Seizure	Label: Flying Nun; Catalogue: FN125	—
1991	Croaker	Label: Flying Nun; Catalogue: FN165	—
1993	Polyfoto, Duck-Shaped Pain and Gum	"Polyfoto" (introduction), Duck-Shaped Pain (LP), "Gum" (bonus EP); Label: Flying Nun; Catalogue: FN249	—
1995	Songs of You And Me	Double album – Hanging Out for Time to Cure Birth and A Stranger's Iron Shore; Label: Flying Nun; Catalogue: FN313	—
1997	Yes!!	Released: 23 September 1997; Label: Flying Nun; Catalogue: FN400	—
2000	Beat	Released: 22 August 2000; Label: Flying Nun; Catalogue: FN444	—
2002	Inaccuracies & Omissions	Released as Friend; Released: 31 March 2003; Label: Flying Nun; Catalogue: FN471	—
2005	Chris Knox & The Nothing	Released as Chris Knox & The Nothing; Label: A Major Label; sometimes called Play Loud for Best Results	—
2008	A Warm Gun	Released as The Nothing; Label: A Major Label; Catalogue: AMAJ001	—
"—" denotes a recording that did not chart or was not released in that territory.

=== Compilations ===
Year	Title	Details	Peak chart positions
Year	Title	Details	NZ
1993	Meat	Compilation of tracks from Seizure and Croaker; Label: Communion; Catalogue: COMM 28-2	—
1999	Almost	Bonus CD with Yes!!; Label: Dark Beloved Cloud; Catalogue: DBC 220	—
2016	KnoxTraxFine	Thokei Tapes	-
"—" denotes a recording that did not chart or was not released in that territory.

=== Tribute albums ===
Year	Title	Details	Peak chart positions
Year	Title	Details	NZ
2009	Stroke: Songs for Chris Knox	Various artists; Released: 16 November 2009; Label: Merge Records; Catalogue: AMAJ002	—
"—" denotes a recording that did not chart or was not released in that territory.

=== Singles and EPs ===
Year	Title	Details	Peak chart positions
Year	Title	Details	NZ
1989	"Not Given Lightly" / Guppiplus	Label: Flying Nun; Catalogue: FN127	—
1990	"Not Given Lightly"	Label: Flying Nun; Catalogue: FN152	—
1990	Song For 1990	Label: Flying Nun; Catalogue: FN155	—
1993	"Under The Influence"	Label: Flying Nun; Catalogue: FN266	—
1993	Chris Knox/Tall Dwarfs split	Label: Forced Exposure; Catalogue: FE-031	—
1993	"Not Given Lightly"	Label: Communion; Catalogue: COMM 26-1	—
1995	One Fell Swoop	Label: FN316; Catalogue: Flying Nun	—
1996	Songs From 1990	Label: Caroline; Catalogue: CAR 7528	—
1996	15th Anniversary Etching	Label: Flying Nun; Catalogue: FN372	—
1998	"Not Given Lightly"	Label: Curveball; Catalogue: Curve 3CD	—
"—" denotes a recording that did not chart or was not released in that territory.

=== See also ===
- Category:Albums produced by Chris Knox

== Awards ==
=== Aotearoa Music Awards ===
The Aotearoa Music Awards (previously known as New Zealand Music Awards (NZMA)) are an annual awards night celebrating excellence in New Zealand music and have been presented annually since 1965.

Year	Nominee / work	Award	Result	Ref.
1993	Chris Knox for Duck Shaped Pain and Gum	Album Cover of the Year	Nominated	
1994	Chris Knox for 3 EPs by Tall Dwarfs	Album Cover of the Year	Nominated	
1995	Chris Knox for Songs of You and Me	Album Cover of the Year	Nominated	
2006	Chris Knox for As Sweet As Sin (Bleeders)	Album Cover of the Year	Won	
2012	Chris Knox (as part of Toy Love)	New Zealand Music Hall of Fame	inductee	
