= Three Songs (Tall Dwarfs EP) =

EP by Tall Dwarfs
- Released: 1981
- Label: Furtive, Flying Nun Records WEE001
- Producer: Tall Dwarfs

Tall Dwarfs chronology
| Three Songs (1981) | Louis Likes His Daily Dip (1982) |

Professional ratings
Review scores
| Source | Rating |
|---|---|
| AllMusic | 4.5/5 stars |
| Spin Alternative Record Guide | 7/10 |

Three Songs is an EP by New Zealand band Tall Dwarfs, released in 1981. It was the first recording released by the band.

The EP was included on Hello Cruel World, released in 1987.

== Critical reception ==
AllMusic called it "a mix of homemade melodic genius, lo-fi recording that has a soul, lyrics cribbed from the heart of a life-loving crank, and a basketful of unexplained noises that only happen in the middle of the night when you're alone in the house."

== Legacy ==
Chris Jenkins, in Rock: The Rough Guide, credited the EP with helping to introduce the practice of lo-fi home recording.

== Track listing ==
1. "Nothing's Going to Happen"
2. "Luck or Loveliness"
3. "All My Hollowness to You"
