= The Sorrows of an American =

Novel by Siri Hustvedt

- The cover of the first edition, April 2008
- Author: Siri Hustvedt
- Language: English
- Publisher: Henry Holt and Company
- Publication date: 2008
- Publication place: United States
- Media type: Print (hardback)
- Pages: 320 pp.
- ISBN: 978-0-8050-7908-1
- OCLC: 163625217
- Dewey Decimal: 813/.54 22
- LC Class: PS3558.U813 S67 2008

The Sorrows of an American is Siri Hustvedt's fourth novel. It was first published in 2008 and is about a Norwegian American family and their troubles. The novel is partly autobiographical in that Hustvedt herself is of Norwegian descent and in that passages from her own deceased father's journal about the Depression in America and the Pacific theatre of war during World War II are scattered through the book.

The Sorrows of an American operates on several time levels and depicts the difficult times of four generations of the fictional Davidsen family. At the core of the novel lies a long-kept family secret which the first person narrator, a middle-aged psychiatrist called Erik Davidsen who lives and works in New York, sets out to unearth together with his sister. However, the novel abounds in subplots which focus on the present rather than the past.

== Plot summary ==
On the death of their father Lars, a retired Professor of History, Erik Davidsen and his sister Inga, a philosopher, clean out his home office in rural Minnesota and, while going through his copious papers, find a cryptic note written and signed by someone they do not know called Lisa which suggests to them that as a boy back in the 1930s their father was involved in some illicit act and that he has kept his promise never to tell anyone about it. The siblings decide to investigate the matter further, if only half-heartedly at first. For the time being, Erik Davidsen is preoccupied reading his father's journals, which the latter completed only shortly before his demise. For Erik, all this will mean that in the months to come he will not only be haunted by the ghosts of the present but also of the past.

It has been pointed out that none of the characters in The Sorrows of an American leads a carefree, untroubled existence. The narrator himself suffers from a slight form of depression triggered by his recent divorce, childless state, and subsequent feeling of loneliness but still finds satisfaction in attempting to cure his patients of the complaints he occasionally recognizes in himself. His sister Inga has had absence seizures from childhood and migraines all her adult life. What is more, when the novel opens she is being harassed by a female journalist who states her intention to publicize hitherto unknown facts about Inga's deceased husband, a cult author and filmmaker, and who demands that she be co-operative without telling her what exactly she is aiming at or planning to do. Inga's 18-year-old daughter Sonia suffers from posttraumatic stress disorder, having witnessed, from the windows of her Manhattan school, the September 11, 2001 attacks and the collapse of the twin towers of the World Trade Center. Lars Davidsen, the long-term patriarch of the family, was a fugueur.

But also the characters outside the family show neurological symptoms. Whereas the journalist who is harassing Inga only bears an age-old personal grudge against her (of which the latter is unaware) and is out for straightforward revenge, Erik's friend and colleague Bernard Burton, apart from sweating excessively, has not been able to cope with the fact that Inga is not in love with him and, without her realizing it, has kept a watchful eye on her over the years in a way which might be construed as stalking. Edie Bly, a former actress who is now impoverished, is a recovering substance abuser who has an illegitimate son by Inga's deceased husband and appears to be in an unstable psychological condition. Finally, the real stalker in the novel, a photographer and installation artist called Jeffrey Lane, displays various signs of compulsive behaviour, for example the urge to document virtually everything in his life by taking photos. He crosses the psychiatrist's path while pursuing his former girlfriend, a Jamaican-born beauty who has recently rented, and moved into, the downstairs apartment of Erik's now too large Brooklyn brownstone.

Erik Davidsen is immediately drawn towards Miranda, the young woman from Jamaica, and Eglantine, her pre-school daughter by Jeffrey Lane. He soon falls head over heels in love with the dark-skinned woman while at the same time watching what he perceives to be the slow but steady deterioration of his own self. Gently rejected by Miranda, he has enough willpower left to go on a date with a sexy colleague and, for purely physical reasons, starts an affair with her. As the story progresses, however, he is more and more pulled into the quagmire of events surrounding Miranda, Inga, and himself. At one point he catches a burglar in his empty house at night, is surprised to see it is Lane, confused when the escaping Lane takes a photo of him wearing nothing much but wielding a hammer, and shocked when, months later, he recognizes the image at one of Lane's exhibitions with a caption saying, Head Doctor Goes Insane.

Most of the mysteries are cleared up in the end. Erik and Inga succeed in tracking down the mysterious — and now dying — Lisa, and it turns out that all those years ago a young Lars Davidsen helped her bury her illegitimate, stillborn child, in all secrecy, somewhere on his family's farm. The reputation of Inga's deceased husband is not smeared either when the existence of a batch of letters to Edie Bly can be established without doubt but when it turns out at the same time that they have no sensational value because they belong to the realm of fiction—they are addressed to the character Bly played in one of the author's films rather than Bly the actress and mother of his child. Bernard Burton proves instrumental in procuring the letters without succumbing to the temptation to actually read them, in a chivalric act in which he dresses up as a frightful bag lady in order not to reveal his identity, a scene which also provides some comic relief. The conclusion of the novel is a four-page stream-of-consciousness-like recapitulation of the story's images racing through Erik's mind, and the assurance that the characters' fragmented lives will remain that way.

== Reviews ==
The Sorrows of an American was published to almost unanimously positive reviews. Ron Charles calls it "a radically postmodern novel that wears its po-mo credentials with unusual grace; even at its strangest moments, it never radiates the chilly alienation that marks, say, the work of Hustvedt's husband, Paul Auster." For Sylvia Brownrigg, "the erudite Hustvedt" explores "larger questions of art and madness, mind and spirit, and the construction of the self" through the dialogues of her intellectually minded characters and the interior monologues of her narrator. True, little use is made of the vernacular, which prompts Haley Edwards to state that "Hustvedt writes very well, but her prose has all the flair of your Aunt Olga's dinner rolls. Sometimes Erik says things about the human condition that are wonderfully perceptive and incredibly poignant, but he seems to say them as if he's observing the human condition, rather than experiencing it himself."

What some critics found disappointing is that "the secrets Inga and Erik pursue don't yield the drama or meaning they have hoped for, suffusing the scenes of revelation with an air of anticlimax. This may be intentional—Hustvedt may be warning us of the folly of hoping for neat resolutions in our explorations of past pains—but it means the narrative slackens somewhat toward the end."
