= Seizure (album) =

Studio album by Chris Knox
- Released: 1989
- Genre: Punk rock, indie rock
- Label: Flying Nun

Seizure is the second album by New Zealand musician Chris Knox, released in 1989 by record label Flying Nun.

== Track listing ==
1. "The Face of Fashion"
2. "The Woman Inside of Me"
3. "Statement of Intent"
4. "Filling Me"
5. "Not Given Lightly"
6. "Break!"
7. "Uncle Tom's Cabin"
8. "Wanna!!"
9. "And I Will Cry"
10. "Rapist"
11. "Grand Mal"
12. "Voyeur"
13. "Honesty's Not Enough"
14. "My Dumb Luck"
15. "Ache"

== Reception ==
Professional ratings
Review scores
Source	Rating
AllMusic	3/5 stars
Metro	8/10
Trouser Press	favourable

Trouser Press called it "a brilliant record, with one marvel of wit, melody and DIY production after another".
