= What I Loved =

2003 Siri Hustvedt novel

- First edition (UK)
- Author: Siri Hustvedt
- Language: English
- Publisher: Sceptre
- Publication date: 2003
- Publication place: United States
- Media type: Print (Paperback)
- Pages: 370 pp.
- ISBN: 978-0-340-83072-7
- OCLC: 163625217

What I Loved is a novel written by American writer Siri Hustvedt first published in 2003 by Hodder and Stoughton in London. It is written from the point of view of Leo Hertzberg, an art historian living in New York. The author herself grew up in Northfield, Minnesota, and then moved to New York in 1978. In a discussion of the September 11 attacks, she describes New York as "as much an idea as an actual place".

The work follows the relationship between Leo and artist Bill Wechsler, and the close ties between each of the characters' families. It explores themes of love, loss, art and psychology.

Some specific psychological themes explored in the novel are grief, eating disorders and hysteria. Hustvedt discusses hysteria further in a talk entitled, "A writer's adventures in psychiatry and neuro-science" and her sister, Asti Hustvedt, has written a book about the state entitled Medical muses : the culture of hysteria in nineteenth-century Paris.

== Plot summary ==
What I Loved opens with a painting of a woman 'wearing only a man's T-shirt', with the artist's shadow across the canvas. The protagonist, art historian Leon Hertzberg (Leo), purchases the painting and some time afterwards befriends the artist, Bill Wechsler. Bill is, at this stage, an unknown artist, though as the novel progresses, so too does his career in the New York art scene. This is in part due to Leo's writing, which brings Bill's work into the public eye. Bill is married to Lucille, a highly strung poet, and Leo is married to Erica, a literary academic. The two couples become close and move into the same apartment block. Erica and Lucille fall pregnant around the same time and have sons, Mathew and Mark. The first half of the novel explores their quiet, domestic lives, through the eyes of Leo. Lucille and Bill separate after he forms a relationship with Violet, the model who posed for the painting which opens the text.

The opening of part Two of the novel is described by Robert Birnbaum, in an interview with the author, as like a punch in the face and the pace of the novel accelerates after this point. Leo and Erica's son, Mathew, dies suddenly. Grief-stricken, Leo eventually loses Erica, who moves away for distance as well as work. Leo forms a close relationship with Bill's son Mark. Mark is, however, an insincere and somewhat amoral character, and a pattern is repeated between the two, of trust and betrayal, until Leo and the reader realise Mark is probably not capable of affection.

Mark befriends performance and installation artist Teddy Giles, whose art is designed to shock, but seems empty and only designed to serve that one purpose. Bill eventually dies in his studio and Violet attempts to curtail her grief by cleaning manically. Leo becomes embroiled in a thriller-like plot attempting to track down Mark who has become lost in Teddy Giles's scene. Leo finally professes his love for Violet. She tells him he can have her for one night, but that she's then moving away. He declines and returns to his apartment alone.

A minor character throughout the novel, Lazlo Finkelman, moves amongst similar circles to Teddy Giles and Mark, but with very different intentions and values. At the close of the novel, an aging Leo finds comfort in playing with Lazlo's young son.

== Reviews ==
Andrew Roe in the San Francisco Chronicle had criticized several aspects of the novel including the author's "repetitive use of time transitions", but concluded that the novel is "another accomplished performance from…a writer of undeniable talent and someone from whom we can expect even better things in the future."

Janet Burroway in the New York Times Book Review writes of the protagonist in part One that his "parental concerns seem banal, and his ambivalent speculations less than engaging". However, she concludes, that the work "is a rare thing, a page turner written at full intellectual stretch, serious but witty, large-minded and morally engaged."

Noonie Minogue wrote in the Times Literary Supplement that the novel "makes you ponder human existence with a peculiar mixture of stoicism and wonder."

== Literature on the novel ==
Hubert Zapf analysed the novel in "Narrative, Ethics, and Postmodern Art in Siri Hustvedt's What I Loved" which was published in a collection called The Dissemination of Values through Literature and Other Media.

Christine Marks discusses the novel in her work "Hysteria, Doctor-Patient Relationships, and Identity Boundaries in Siri Hustvedt's What I Loved" published in the online magazine Gender Forum.
