= Louis Likes His Daily Dip =

EP by Tall Dwarfs
- Released: 1982
- Label: Flying Nun Records WEE001

Tall Dwarfs chronology
Three Songs (1981)	Louis Likes His Daily Dip (1982)	Canned Music (1983)

Professional ratings
Review scores
Source	Rating
AllMusic	3/5 stars

Louis Like His Daily Dip is an EP by the New Zealand band Tall Dwarfs, released in 1982.

== Track listing ==
1. "Louis The First"
2. "Maybe"
3. "Pictures On The Floor"
4. "Paul's Place"
5. "Clover"
6. "Song Of The Silents"
7. "Louis The Second"
