= Alec Bathgate =

New Zealand musician

- Born: New Zealand
- Genres: Indie pop
- Years active: 1978–present
- Labels: Flying Nun Records, Lil' Chief Records

Alec Bathgate is a New Zealand musician who was a key member of The Enemy and Toy Love, as well as being one half of the Flying Nun Records act Tall Dwarfs, alongside Chris Knox. In addition to playing guitar in these bands, he also released three solo albums.

== Solo discography ==
=== Albums ===
List of albums
Title	Details
Gold Lame	Released: 1996; Label: Flying Nun Records (FN353); Format: LP, CD, Cassette
The Indifferent Velvet Void	Released: 2004; Label: Lil' Chief Records (LCR009); Format: CD, DD
Phantom Dots	Released: November 2020; Label: Thokei Tapes (TT15); Format: Cassette

== Awards ==
=== Aotearoa Music Awards ===
The Aotearoa Music Awards (previously known as New Zealand Music Awards (NZMA)) are an annual awards night celebrating excellence in New Zealand music and have been presented annually since 1965.

Year	Nominee / work	Award	Result	Ref.
1995	Alec Bathgate for 3 EPs by Tall Dwarfs	Album Cover of the Year	Nominated	
1996	Alec Bathgate for Abbasalutely	Album Cover of the Year	Won	
2012	Alec Bathgate (as part of Toy Love)	New Zealand Music Hall of Fame	inductee	
