= Slugbucket Hairybreath Monster =

EP by Tall Dwarfs
- Released: 1984
- Label: Flying Nun Records – FNTIN 1

Tall Dwarfs chronology
Canned Music (1983)	Slugbucket Hairybreath Monster (1984)	That's the Short and Long of It (1985)

Professional ratings
Review scores
Source	Rating
AllMusic	4.5/5 stars

Slugbucket Hairybreath Monster is an EP by the New Zealand band Tall Dwarfs, released in 1984.

== Track listing ==
Side A

1. "The Brain That Wouldn't Die"
2. "Phil's Disease (Day One)"
3. "I've Left Memories Behind"

Side B

1. "Phil's Disease (Day Four)"
2. "Crush"
