= Step into the Music =

"Step Into the Music"

Single by Dogma
- Released: 2002
- Genre: Pop
- Length: 3:46
- Label: Blue Planet Productions
- Songwriter(s): Azlan
- Producer(s): Dogma

"Step Into the Music" is the debut and only single by Australian group, Dogma. It was released in late 2002 and peaked at number 49 on the ARIA charts.

== Track listings ==
1. "Step Into the Music" (Radio Edit) - 3:46
2. "Step Into the Music" (Prize Money Dub Mix) - 6:03
3. "Step Into the Music" (Carlos Sanchez House Mix) - 8:49
4. "Step Into the Music" (Original Extended) - 5:19

== Charts ==
Chart (2002/03)	Peak position
Australia (ARIA)	49
