= Stumpy (album) =

Studio album by Tall Dwarfs
- Released: 1996
- Genre: Indie rock, lo-fi
- Length: 62:30
- Label: Flying Nun Records

Tall Dwarfs chronology
3 EPs (1994)	Stumpy (1996)	Gluey, Gluey and The Ear Friend (1998)

Stumpy is an album by New Zealand band Tall Dwarfs released in 1996. The album is officially credited to the "International Tall Dwarfs", because sounds from cassettes by 16 home tapers from around the globe, including CJA, were used to create the music. All songs were written by Bathgate and Knox.

== Track listing ==
1. "Swan Song"
2. "They Like You, Undone"
3. "The Green, Green Grass Of Someone Else's Home"
4. "The Severed Head Of Julio"
5. "Crocodile"
6. "Macramé"
7. "Song Of The Jealous Lover"
8. "Honey, I'm Home"
9. "Jesus The Beast"
10. "Cruising With Cochran"
11. "Things"
12. "Mojave"
13. "Box Of Aroma"
14. "Ghost Town"
15. "Deep-Fried"
16. "Disoriented Bodgie"
17. "And That's Not All!!"
18. "Pull The Thread [& Unravel Me]"
19. "Dessicated" [sic]
20. "Albumen"
21. "Two Minds"
22. "Up"
