= Life Is Strange (film) =

2012 American documentary film

Life Is Strange is a 2012 American documentary film of interviews giving an oral history portrait of the life of pre-World War II European Jews by filmmaker Isaac Hertz. The film juxtaposes the childhood memories of interviewees with archival footage. Interviewees include Israeli president Shimon Peres, author Uri Orlev, academics, Nobel laureates, and friends of the filmmaker, Walter Kohn, Robert J. Aumann, Alain Jakubowicz, Sammy Grundwerg, Ron Samuels, Zachary Cirino, Chaim Hertz, Arianne Brown, Artem Zuev and Jean-Michel Guirao.

The film is 96 minutes long and explores pre-war Yiddish culture and the experience of living in a world very different from what it is like in the past. It has received criticism for the unclear reasoning behind the assortment of people interviewed.
