= Canned Music =

EP by Tall Dwarfs
- Released: 1983
- Label: Flying Nun Records – FNTIN 1

Tall Dwarfs chronology
Louis Likes His Daily Dip (1982)	Canned Music (1983)	Slugbucket Hairybreath Monster (1984)

Professional ratings
Review scores
Source	Rating
AllMusic	4.5/5 stars

Canned Music is an EP by New Zealand band Tall Dwarfs, released in 1983.

== Track listing ==
Side A

1. "Canopener" - 03:12
2. "Beauty" - 02:06
3. "This Room Is Wrong" - 03:15
4. "Walking Home" - 02:14

Side B

1. "Turning Brown And Torn In Two" - 04:31
2. "Woman" - 03:03
3. "Shade For Today" - 01:47
