= Lloyd Hustvedt =

American Scandinavian scholar and historian (1922–2004)

Lloyd Hustvedt (April 18, 1922 – February 2, 2004) was an American professor, author, and scholar of Norwegian-American history.

== Background ==
Lloyd Merlin Hustvedt was born and raised in the Sogn Valley in Goodhue County, Minnesota. His parents, Lars Iversen Hustvedt (1887–1973) and Mathilde Anette (Underdahl) Hustvedt (1893–1991), were children of Norwegian immigrants. Hustvedt finished his BA degree at St. Olaf College with a major in Norwegian. He received his MA degree from the University of Minnesota and his PhD in Scandinavian studies from the University of Wisconsin.

== Career ==
In 1954, Hustvedt became a professor at St. Olaf College where he was later chairman of the Norwegian Department and was named the first holder of the King Olav V Professorship in Norwegian studies. In 1959, he became executive secretary of the Norwegian-American Historical Association, a position he would keep for four decades. He was a charter member of the Norwegian Researchers and Teachers Association of North America. He also served on the board of directors of the Vesterheim Norwegian-American Museum. Hustvedt was the author of numerous essays and articles relating to his field of study. He is most frequently associated with his biography of Rasmus Björn Anderson.

In 1967 he was awarded the McKnight Prize in Literature by the McKnight Family Literary Fund. Hustvedt received a grant under the Fulbright-Hays Act and traveled to Iceland during the summer of 1968. In 1980 he was awarded the Order of St. Olav, Knight First Class by King Olav V. In 1985, he was the first American to be recognized by the America-Norway Heritage Fund for his contributions to Norwegian-American understanding and for preserving the history of Norwegian immigrants in the United States.

== Personal life ==
In 1954, Lloyd Hustvedt was married to Norwegian native Ester Vegan with whom he had four children including the author Siri Hustvedt.

== Selected works ==
- Norwegian Grammar Language Self Learning (1977)
- Rasmus Bjorn Anderson. Scandinavians in America (1979)
- O.A. Tveitmoe: Labor leader (1985)
