= Dogma (international metal band) =

International heavy metal band

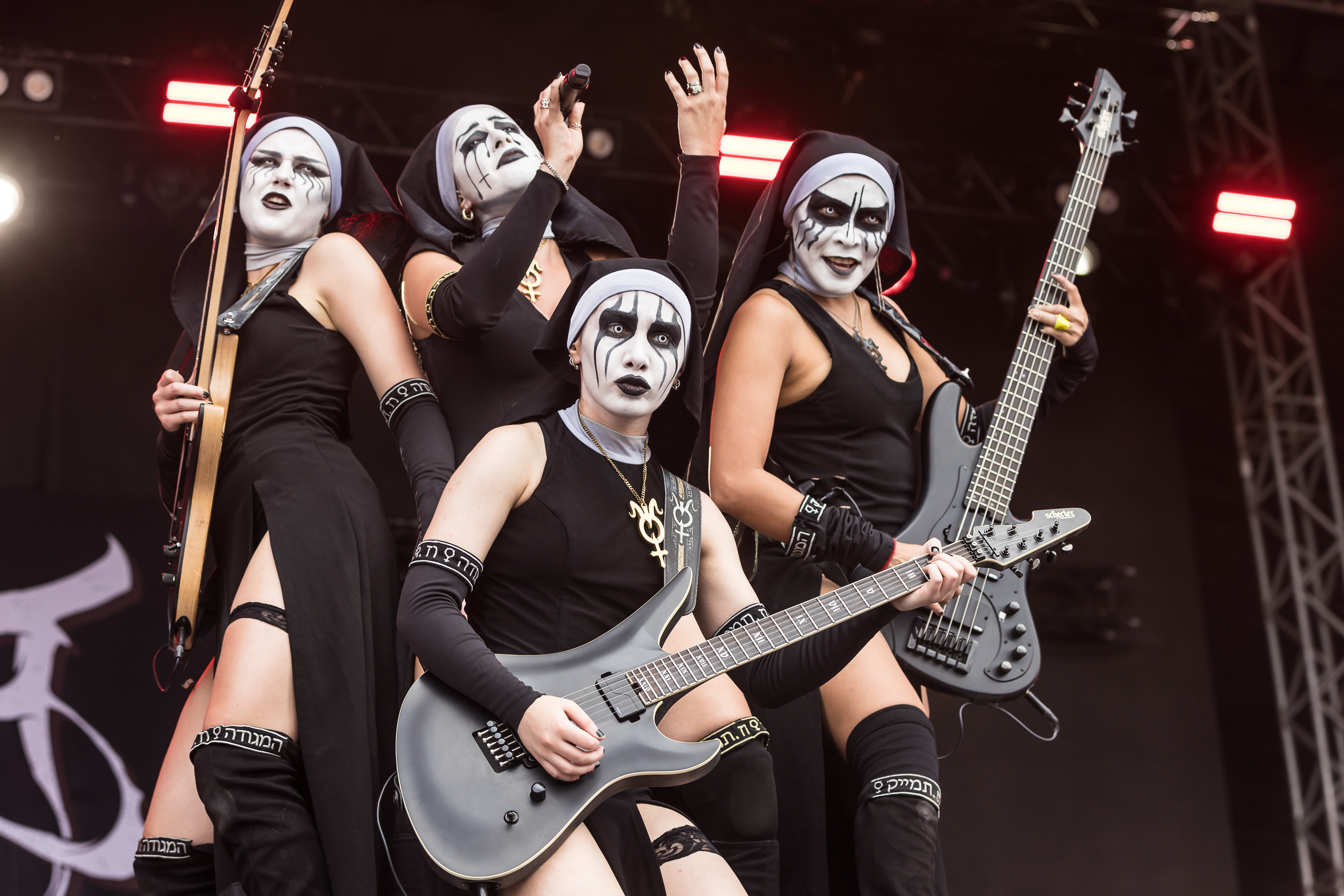
- Dogma at Rockharz 2026

Background information
- Origin: South America
- Genres: heavy metal; hard rock
- Years active: 2019–present
- Label: independent
- Members: Ian Di Leo; Patricia Alejandra Flores; Alice Zepeda; Dominika Sowa; Ani Blackrose; Daniela Guerra
- Past members: Álvaro Rabaquino; Fede Rabaquino; Isa Roddy; Lina de la Parra; Nanu Villalba; Bruna Terroni; Elisa Fortunato; Amber Maldonado; Grace Jane Pasturini; Adi Argelazi Faun; Patricia Martínez-Abarca Ruiz; Alice Chiara
- Website: officialdogma.com

Dogma is an international heavy metal and hard rock band, formed in 2019. Most of the members come from South America, but musicians from the USA, Spain, Italy, Israel or Poland are or were also part of the band. The band members assume fixed roles, even though the lineup changes.

== History ==
The band was founded by producer Ian Di Leo and songwriters/producers Álvaro and Fede Rabaquino, who conceived the idea of an all-female heavy metal band. The band's songs revolve around female empowerment. The singers and musicians change frequently.

In 2023, their self-titled debut album was released. At the end of 2025, the production trio announced that, following a falling out, the two Rabaquino brothers and three members of the live band were leaving the Dogma project. They went on to form the similarly themed band VindictA.

== Criticism ==
It is criticized that the band is not really an organically grown band, but rather a brand with a specific, artificially created image. The management's contracts with the musicians, which grant them only very limited rights, are also criticized.

== Band members ==
Current

- Ian Di Leo ("The Light Messiah") – lyrics, management, concept (2019–present)
- Patricia Alejandra Flores ("Nixe") – bass (2023–present)
- Alice Zepeda ("Abrahel") – drums (2023–present)
- Dominika Sowa ("Lamia") – lead guitar (2025–present)
- Ani Blackrose ("Rusalka") – rhythm guitar (2025–present)
- Daniela Guerra ("Lilith") – vocals (2025–present)

Former

- Álvaro Rabaquino ("The Dark Messiah") – songwriting, lyrics, producer (2019–2025)
- Fede Rabaquino ("The Dusk Messiah") – songwriting, lyrics, producer (2019-2025)
- Isabela Roddy ("Lilith") – vocals (2019–2022)
- Adi Argelazi Faun ("Lilith") – vocals (2023)
- Grace Jane Pasturini ("Lilith") – vocals (2023–2025)
- Bruna Terroni ("Lamia") - lead guitar (2022–2023)
- Amber Maldonado ("Lamia") - lead guitar (2023–2025)
- Alice Chiara ("Lamia") - lead guitar (2025)
- Lina de la Parra ("Nixe") - bass (2022-2023)
- Patricia Martínez-Abarca Ruiz ("Rusalka") – rhythm guitar (2024-2025)
- Nahir Salomé Villalba ("Abrahel") – drums (2022–2023)
- Elisa Fortunato ("Abrahel") – drums (2023)

== Gallery ==
Dogma, band members live at Rockharz 2026

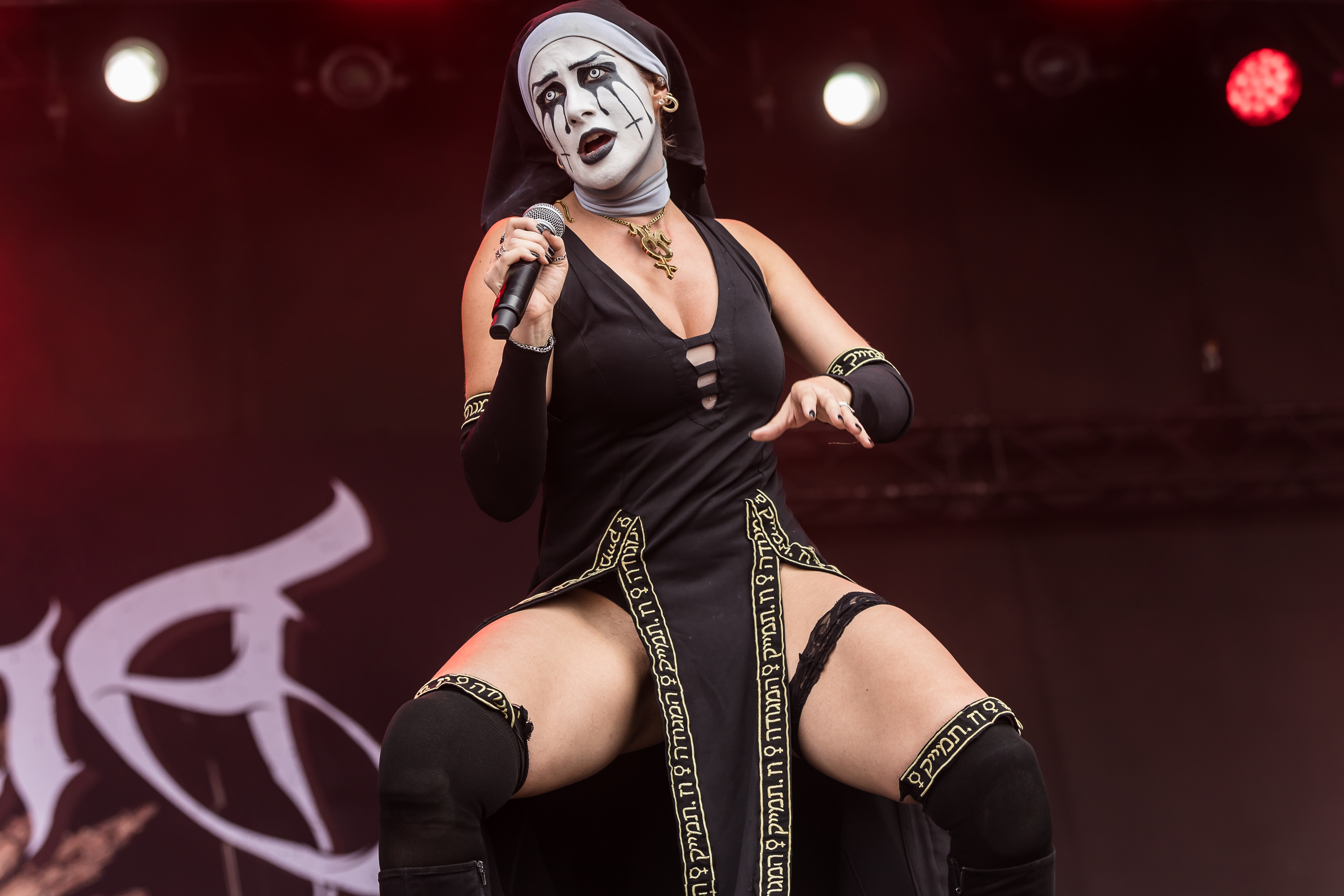
Daniela Guerra ("Lilith"), vocals

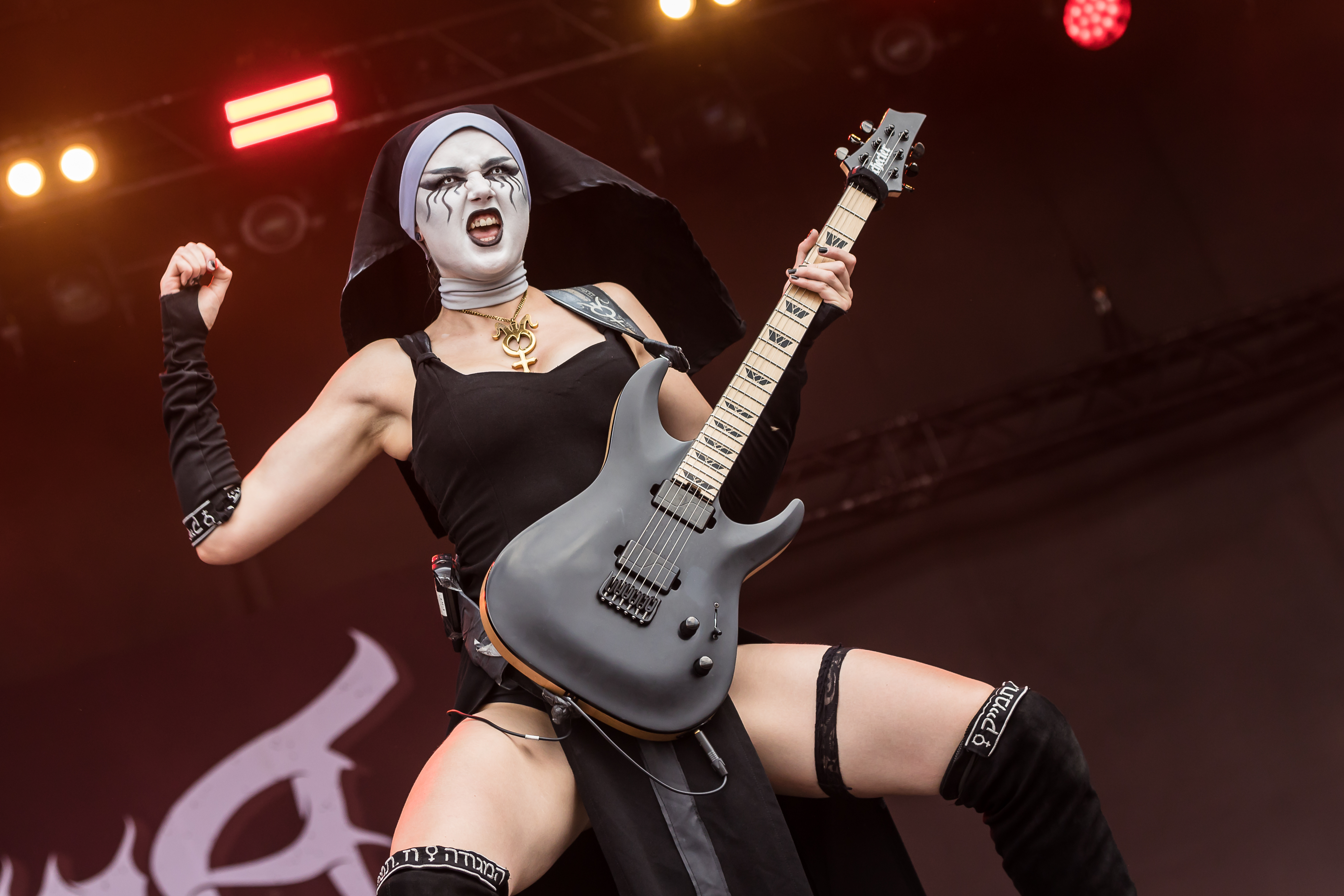
Dominika Sowa ("Lamia"), lead guitar

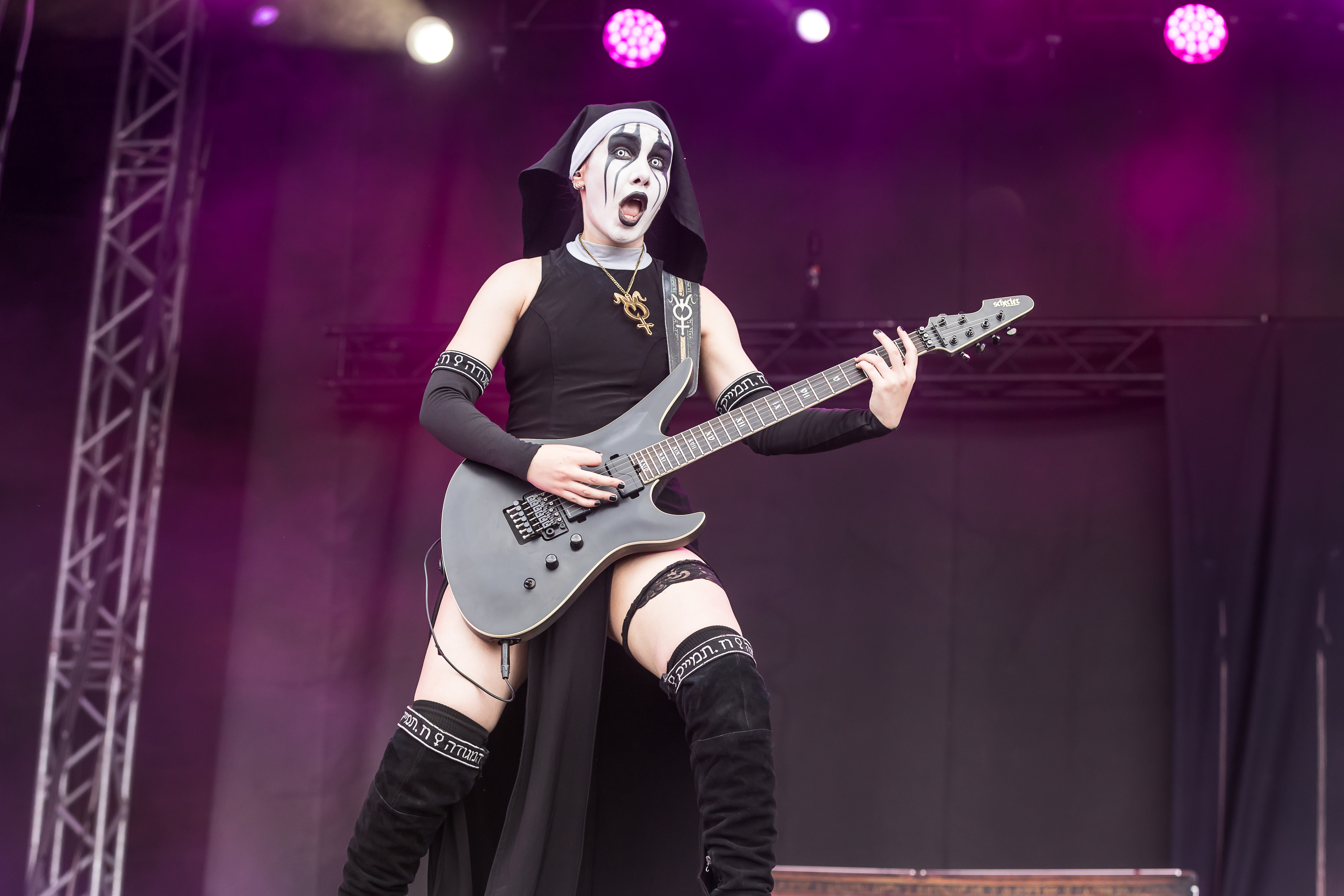
Ani Blackrose ("Rusalka"), rhythm guitar

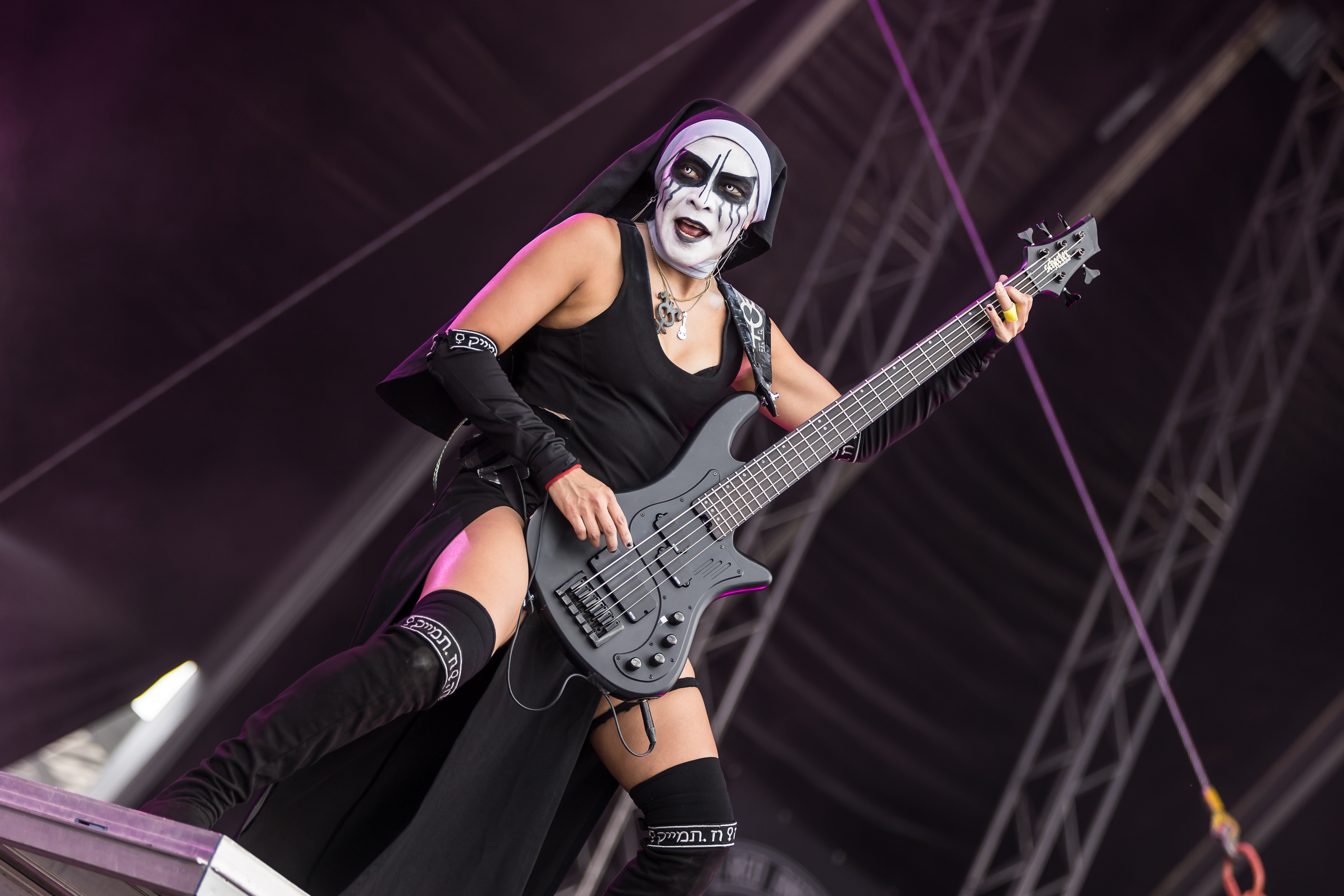
Patricia Alejandra Flores ("Nixe"), bass

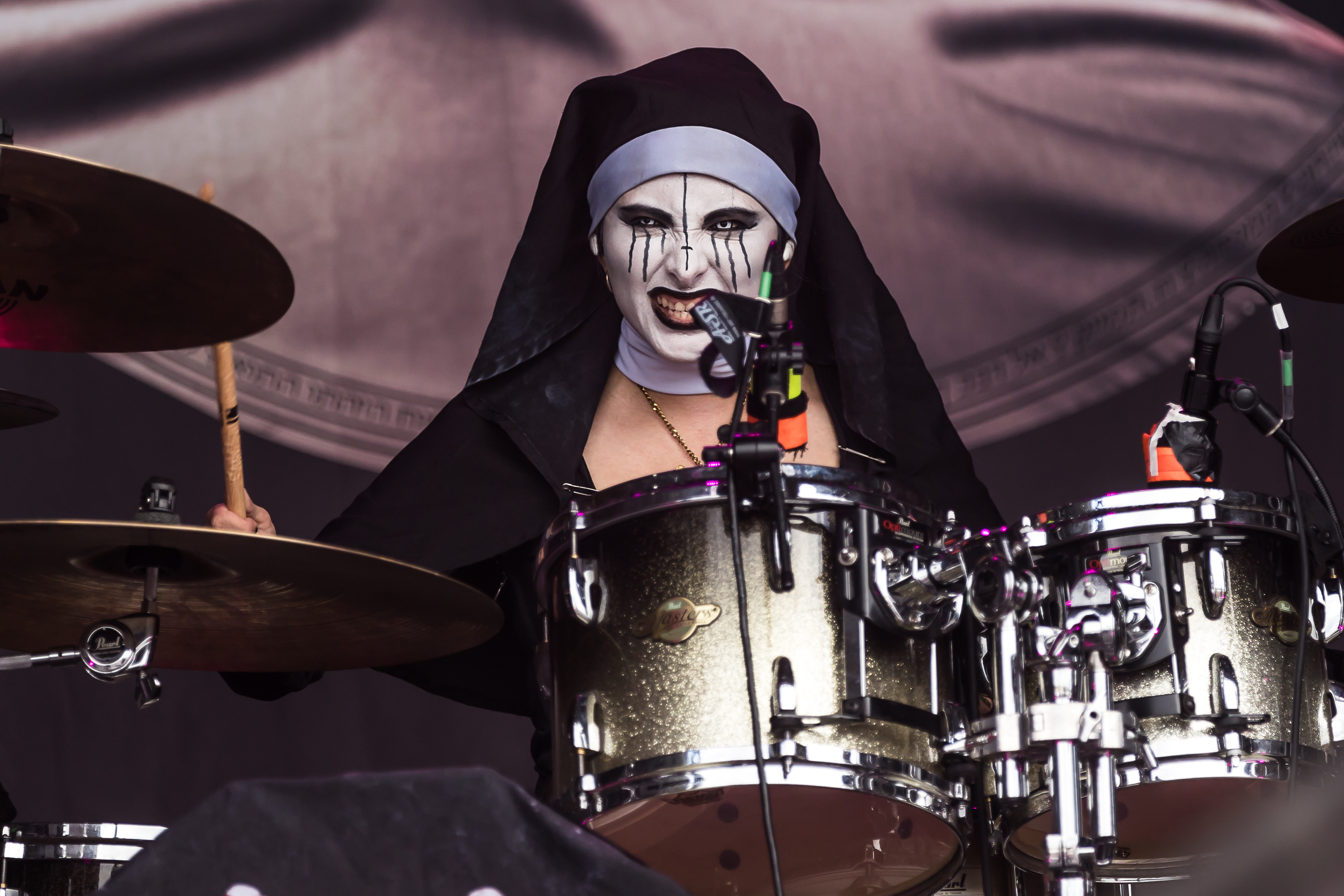
Alice Zepeda ("Abrahel"), drums

== Discography ==
- Dogma (2023)
