= 3 EPs =

Studio album by Tall Dwarfs
- Released: 1994
- Recorded: 12–14 January 1992 & 13–16 June 1993 at Intellectually Handicapped Studios
- Genre: Indie rock, lo-fi
- Length: 56:12
- Label: Flying Nun Records

Tall Dwarfs chronology
Fork Songs (1991)	3 EPs (1994)	Stumpy (1996)

Professional ratings
Review scores
Source	Rating
Allmusic	4.5/5 stars

3 EPs is a full-length CD by the New Zealand band Tall Dwarfs, released in 1994. The CD consists of three parts – A Question Of Medical Ethics, Up The Down Staircase and Sam's Spaniel – which were also released as three vinyl EPs collected in one box, all at once.

== Track listing ==
All songs written by Bathgate & Knox except where noted.

- A Question of Medical Ethics
1. "For All the Walters in the World"
2. "Entropy"
3. "What Goes Up"
4. "Highrise"
5. "Starry Eyed & Wooly Brained" (sic)
6. "Folding"
- Up The Down Staircase
1. "Neusyland"
2. "Two Dozen Lousy Hours"
3. "Bob's Yer Uncle"
4. "More 54"
5. "Archaeopteryx"
6. "Aint It Funny"
- Sam's Spaniel
1. "Senile Dementia" (written by Bathgate, Knox, Nastanovich, Kannberg)
2. "Bee to Honey"
3. "Postmodern Deconstructivist Blues" (written by Bathgate, Knox, Nastanovich, Kannberg)
4. "Kidstuff"
5. "Self-Deluded Dream Boy (In A Mess)"
6. "Our Advice to You"
