= Seizure (journal) =

- Discipline: Epilepsy
- Language: English
- Edited by: Markus Reuber

Publication details
- Publisher: Elsevier
- Frequency: 10/year
- Open access: Delayed after 1 year and Hybrid
- Impact factor: 3.184 (2020)

Standard abbreviations
- ISO 4: Seizure

Indexing
- ISSN: 1059-1311 (print); 1532-2688 (web)
- OCLC no.: 24484471

Links
- Journal homepage; Online access; Online archive; Open archive at ScienceDirect; Journal page on publisher's website

Seizure: European Journal of Epilepsy is a peer-reviewed medical journal covering epilepsy established in 1992. The editor-in-chief is Markus Reuber (University of Sheffield). It is the official journal of Epilepsy Action. It is published ten times a year by Elsevier.

== Abstracting and indexing ==
The journal is abstracted and indexed in:

- Academic OneFile
- CINAHL
- Current Contents/Clinical Medicine
- Embase
- E-psyche
- Index Medicus/MEDLINE/PubMed
- Neuroscience Citation Index
- PsycINFO
- Psychology Abstracts
- Research Alert
- Science Citation Index
- Scopus

According to the Journal Citation Reports, the journal has a 2013 impact factor of 2.059, ranking it 105th out of 194 journals in the category "Clinical Neurology" and 177th out of 252 journals in the category "Neurosciences".
