= Tall Dwarfs =

New Zealand band from Dunedin

- Origin: New Zealand
- Genres: Lo-fi, indie rock, experimental rock
- Years active: 1981–present
- Spinoff of: Toy Love
- Members: Chris Knox; Alec Bathgate

Tall Dwarfs are a New Zealand rock band formed in 1981 by Chris Knox and Alec Bathgate, who helped pioneer the lo-fi style of rock music. The duo were former members of Toy Love.

The band lacked a drummer, but would use household objects and hand claps to act as percussion. Both members can play guitar, with 12 strings and bass guitar often heard on their records. Both can play organ as well, which has been utilised on some of their songs. The Casiotone is frequently used too, especially on live concerts.

Their debut was the EP Three Songs (1981), and for many years they released EPs only. The album Weeville (1990) was their first full-length album. They did, however, release a number of full-length compilations of their EPs, like Hello Cruel World and The Short and Sick of It.

In the liner notes to their album 3 EPs (1994) (released as a single CD, or as three vinyl EPs collected in one box), they asked for listeners' rhythm tracks: "Send us your idea of a great T.D. throb." The responses came from many countries and were used for the next album, Stumpy (1997). This album was credited to "International Tall Dwarfs."

Bands who have claimed to be influenced by the Tall Dwarfs include Guided by Voices, Jay Reatard, Superchunk, Elf Power, Neutral Milk Hotel and Olivia Tremor Control. In 2005, they did a small number of concerts in the US, playing with the Olivia Tremor Control.

== Discography ==
Date of Release	Title	Label
EPs
1981	Three Songs	Furtive Records
1982	Louis Likes His Daily Dip	Flying Nun Records
1983	Canned Music	Flying Nun Records
1984	Slugbucket Hairybreath Monster	Flying Nun Records
1985	That's the Short and Long of It	Flying Nun Records
1986	Throw a Sickie	Flying Nun Records
1987	Dogma	Flying Nun Records
1998	Gluey, Gluey and The Ear Friend	Flying Nun Records
Albums
1990	Weeville	Flying Nun Records
1991	Fork Songs	Flying Nun Records
1994	3 EPs	Flying Nun Records
1996	Stumpy (as the International Tall Dwarfs)	Flying Nun Records
1998	Fifty Flavours of Glue	Flying Nun Records
2002	The Sky Above the Mud Below	Flying Nun Records
Compilation Albums
1988	Hello Cruel World	Flying Nun Records
1992	The Short and Sick of It	Flying Nun Records
2018	Bovril	Thokei Tapes
2022	Unravelled: 1981 - 2002	Merge Records
