= Dogma (Tall Dwarfs album) =

EP by Tall Dwarfs
- Released: 1987
- Length: 19:52
- Labels: Flying Nun Records FN098; Flying Nun Europe FNE 27

Tall Dwarfs chronology
Throw a Sickie (1986)	Dogma (1987)	Hello Cruel World (1988)

Professional ratings
Review scores
Source	Rating
Allmusic	3/5 stars

Dogma is a 12″ EP by the New Zealand band Tall Dwarfs, released in 1987.

== Track listing ==
Side one
No.	Title	Length
1.	"Lurlene Bayliss"	3:54
2.	"Waltz Of A Good Husband"	2:38
3.	"The Slide"	3:47

Side two
No.	Title	Length
1.	"Cant"	2:46
2.	"Dog"	4:51
3.	"Missed Again"	1:56
