= Beside You: 30 Years of Hits =

Greatest hits album by Dave Dobbyn
- Released: 2009
- Recorded: 1979–2009
- Genre: Rock
- Length: 149:04
- Label: Sony BMG

Dave Dobbyn chronology
Anotherland (2008)	Beside You: 30 Years of Hits (2009)	Harmony House (2016)

Beside You: 30 Years of Hits is a 2009 greatest hits album by New Zealand singer-songwriter Dave Dobbyn. The album debuted at number 4 on the New Zealand Music Charts.

== Track listing ==
The album covers a decade since the 1999 greatest hits Overnight Success. The second disc also includes notable album tracks from over Dobbyn's career. It features a number of re-recorded songs ("Devil You Know", "Outlook For Thursday", "Whaling" and "Guilty"), though unlike Overnight Success it features the original version of "Be Mine Tonight". According to Dobbyn, the new versions are on the album to reflect how the songs have changed through years of live performance.

All tracks are written by Dave Dobbyn unless noted.

Disc 1
No.	Title	Writer(s)	Original album	Length
1.	"Be Mine Tonight" (Th' Dudes)	Dobbyn; Morris	Right First Time (1979)	4:57
2.	"Devil You Know (2009)"	Dobbyn; Lisle Kinney; Peter Warren; Rob Guy	Original by DD Smash on Cool Bananas (1982)	3:32
3.	"Outlook for Thursday (2009)"	Dobbyn; Kinney; Warren; Guy	Original by DD Smash, a non-album single (1983)	4:26
4.	"Magic (What She Do)" (DD Smash)		The Optimist (1984)	3:45
5.	"Love You Like I Should"		Loyal (1988)	3:34
6.	"Whaling (2009)"	Dobbyn; DD Smash	Original by DD Smash on The Optimist (1984)	3:56
7.	"Guilty (2009)"	Dobbyn; DD Smash	Original by DD Smash on The Optimist (1984)	4:39
8.	"Shaky Isles"		Non-album single (1991)	4:18
9.	"Beside You"		The Islander (1998)	3:43
10.	"Belle of the Ball"		Lament for the Numb (1993)	3:57
11.	"Wild Kisses Like Rain"		Anotherland (2008)	3:05
12.	"Naked Flame"		Twist (1994)	4:46
13.	"Lap of the Gods"		Twist (1994)	4:00
14.	"Just Add Water"		Hopetown (2000)	3:50
15.	"Maybe the Rain"		Lament for the Numb (1993)	2:51
16.	"Language"		Twist (1994)	3:29
17.	"Loyal"		Loyal (1988)	4:36
18.	"Slice of Heaven" (with Herbs)		Footrot Flats (1986)	4:37
19.	"You Oughta Be In Love" (with Ardijah)		Footrot Flats (1986)	3:42
20.	"Welcome Home"		Available Light (2005)	3:51
Total length:				79:34

Disc 2
No.	Title	Original album	Length
1.	"Howling At the Moon"	Anotherland (2008)	3:33
2.	"Don't Hold Your Breath"	Lament for the Numb (1993)	4:49
3.	"Lament for the Numb"	Lament for the Numb (1993)	3:32
4.	"Hanging in the Wire"	The Islander (1998)	3:06
5.	"Blindman's Bend"	The Islander (1998)	4:46
6.	"One Proud Minute"	The Islander (1998)	5:05
7.	"Keeping the Flame"	Available Light (2005)	3:04
8.	"Kingdom Come"	Hopetown (2000)	2:44
9.	"Madeleine Avenue"	Overnight Success (1999)	3:46
10.	"Rain on Fire"	Twist (1994)	3:45
11.	"Belltower"	Lament for the Numb (1993)	3:59
12.	"And You Will Lose Everything"	Available Light (2005)	3:24
13.	"You Got Heart"	Available Light (2005)	3:17
14.	"Only Love Remains"	Anotherland (2008)	2:57
15.	"A Long Way Across Town"	Anotherland (2008)	3:10
16.	"Hallelujah Song"	The Islander (1998)	4:14
17.	"I Can't Change My Name"	Twist (1994)	4:47
18.	"It Dawned on Me"	Twist (1994)	2:31
19.	"Pour the Wine"	Available Light (2005)	3:01
Total length:			69:30

== DVD ==
The limited edition of the CD also included a DVD with the following chapters.

1. Th' Dudes
2. On The Road
3. Slice Of Heaven
4. Otaki
5. Mad Ave.
6. Te Henga
7. Bic Runga
8. Piano Man
9. Welcome Home
