= The Dave Dobbyn Collection =

Greatest hits album by Dave Dobbyn
- Released: 1992
- Recorded: 1979–1988
- Genre: Rock
- Length: 57:00
- Label: Festival

Dave Dobbyn chronology
Loyal (1988)	The Dave Dobbyn Collection (1992)	Lament for the Numb (1993)

The Dave Dobbyn Collection is a 1992 compilation album by New Zealand singer-songwriter Dave Dobbyn. It charted at number 4 on the New Zealand Music Chart.

== Track listing ==
All tracks are written by Dave Dobbyn except where noted.

No.	Title	Writer(s)	Original release	Length
1.	"Be Mine Tonight" (Th' Dudes)	Dobbyn; Ian Morris	Right First Time (1979)	4:56
2.	"Lipstick Power"		Non-album single (1981)	3:07
3.	"Devil You Know" (DD Smash)	Dobbyn; Lisle Kinney; Peter Warren; Rob Guy	Cool Bananas (1982)	3:24
4.	"Solo" (DD Smash)	Dobbyn; Kinney; Warren; Guy	Cool Bananas	4:54
5.	"Repetition" (DD Smash)	Dobbyn; Kinney; Warren; Guy	Cool Bananas	3:21
6.	"Outlook For Thursday" (DD Smash)	Dobbyn; Kinney; Warren; Guy	Non-album single (1983)	4:03
7.	"Magic (What She Do)" (DD Smash)		The Optimist (1984)	3:46
8.	"Whaling" (DD Smash)	Dobbyn; DD Smash	The Optimist	3:43
9.	"Guilty" (DD Smash)	Dobbyn; DD Smash	The Optimist	4:43
10.	"Slice of Heaven" (with Herbs)		Footrot Flats (1986)	4:36
11.	"You Oughta Be In Love" (featuring Ardijah)		Footrot Flats	3:41
12.	"Loyal"		Loyal (1988)	4:33
13.	"Love You Like I Should"		Loyal	3:33
14.	"Stay"		Loyal	4:40
Total length:				57:00
