= Overnight Success (Dave Dobbyn album) =

Overnight Success (The Definitive Dave Dobbyn Collection 1979–1999)

Greatest hits album by Dave Dobbyn
- Released: 1999
- Recorded: 1982–1999
- Genre: Rock
- Length: 70:54
- Label: Sony Music Entertainment

Dave Dobbyn chronology
| The Islander (1998) | Overnight Success (The Definitive Dave Dobbyn Collection 1979–1999) (1999) | Hopetown (2000) |

Professional ratings
Review scores
| Source | Rating |
|---|---|
| Allmusic | 3.5/5 stars |

Overnight Success (The Definitive Dave Dobbyn Collection 1979 – 1999) is a 1999 compilation album by New Zealand singer-songwriter Dave Dobbyn. It won an award in the "Film soundtrack/cast recording/compilation" category at the New Zealand Music Awards in 2000, and charted at number 15 in the New Zealand Music Chart.

== Track listing ==
All tracks are written by Dave Dobbyn unless noted.

| No. | Title | Writer(s) | Original album | Length |
|---|---|---|---|---|
| 1. | "Be Mine Tonight (1999)" | Dobbyn; Ian Morris | Original by Th' Dudes on Right First Time (1979) | 4:14 |
| 2. | "Devil You Know" (DD Smash) | Dobbyn; Lisle Kinney; Peter Warren; Rob Guy | Cool Bananas (1982) | 3:26 |
| 3. | "Outlook For Thursday" (DD Smash) | Dobbyn; Kinney; Warren; Guy | Non-album single (1983) | 4:04 |
| 4. | "Magic" (DD Smash) | | The Optimist (1984) | 3:47 |
| 5. | "Whaling" (DD Smash) | Dobbyn; DD Smash | The Optimist | 3:45 |
| 6. | "Guilty" (DD Smash) | Dobbyn; DD Smash | The Optimist | 4:45 |
| 7. | "Slice Of Heaven" | | Footrot Flats (1986) | 4:36 |
| 8. | "Oughta Be In Love" | | Footrot Flats | 3:41 |
| 9. | "Loyal" | | Loyal (1988) | 4:35 |
| 10. | "Love You Like I Should" | | Loyal | 3:33 |
| 11. | "Belle Of The Ball" | | Lament for the Numb (1993) | 3:57 |
| 12. | "Lament For The Numb" | | Lament for the Numb | 3:30 |
| 13. | "Language" | | Twist (1994) | 3:29 |
| 14. | "Naked Flame" | | Twist | 4:46 |
| 15. | "Hanging In The Wire" | | The Islander (1998) | 3:04 |
| 16. | "Beside You" | | The Islander | 3:42 |
| 17. | "Hallelujah Song" | | The Islander | 4:14 |
| 18. | "Madeleine Avenue" | | Previously unreleased | 3:46 |
| Total length: | | | | 70:54 |
