= Where Are the Boys? =

Studio album by Th' Dudes
- Released: July 1980
- Studio: Stebbing Studios (Auckland)
- Genre: Pop rock
- Length: 37:45
- Label: Key
- Producers: Ian Morris; Rob Aickin

Th' Dudes chronology
Right First Time (1979)	Where Are the Boys? (1980)	So You Wanna Be a Rock'n'Roll Star (1982)

Singles from Where Are The Boys?
- 1. "Walking in Light" Released: 1979; 2. "Bliss" Released: 1980

Where Are the Boys? is the second studio album by New Zealand band Th' Dudes, released in 1980. The band had already broken up by the time the record was released.

== Track listing ==
All tracks are written by Dave Dobbyn and Ian Morris, except for "On the Rox" by Peter Urlich.

Side one
No.	Title	Length
1.	"Walking in Light"	3:44
2.	"Spitball Speed"	1:55
3.	"The Modern Choice"	3:45
4.	"Lonely Man"	3:02
5.	"Until You Do"	3:04
6.	"Take It Back"	3:32
Total length:		19:02

Side two
No.	Title	Length
7.	"Bliss"	5:00
8.	"You Got Something"	2:24
9.	"On the Rox"	3:31
10.	"All My Lovers"	3:22
11.	"You Can Make Me Dance"	4:26
Total length:		18:43 37:45

== Personnel ==
Personnel as listed in the album's liner notes are:

=== Th' Dudes ===
- Ian Morris – guitar, keyboards, vocals, production, engineering, cover design
- Dave Dobbyn – guitar, keyboards, vocals
- Peter Urlich – vocals
- Lez White – bass guitar
- Bruce Hambling – drums

=== Production ===
- Rob Aickin – production, engineering, cover design
- Vaughan Stebbing, Janey Dunn – cover design
