= Queen City Rocker =

- Directed by: Bruce Morrison
- Written by: Bill Baer; Richard Lymposs
- Produced by: Bruce Morrison; Henry Fownes; Larry Parr; Michael Sterling
- Cinematography: Kevin Hayward
- Edited by: Michael Hacking
- Release date: 1986
- Running time: 90 minutes
- Country: New Zealand
- Language: English

Queen City Rocker is a 1986 New Zealand film developed from a 10-page outline written by Richard Lymposs, a sixteen-year-old Auckland youth with no prior film or writing experience. In 1981, Lymposs sold Queen City Rocker to Larry Parr, a budding Auckland film producer, and it was shot in 1985. It was directed by Bruce Morrison and starred Matthew Hunter, Mark Pilisi and Kim Willoughby. The screenplay was written by Bill Baer. The film was released as Tearaway on video cassette in the United States.

Musician Dave McArtney of Hello Sailor wrote most of the original music in the film, which also featured other artists including Ardijah, Graham Brazier and Tex Pistol. The soundtrack to the movie was released by Auckland-based Pagan Records. The music ranges from southern reggae to ska to punk, reflecting the late-1970's to early-1980's vibrant underswell in the Auckland music scene.

The original story focused on the friendship between two buddies in actual warring gangs of that time in Auckland. No mention of these two gangs was in the film. It is understood the Auckland Street gangs "The Boot Boys" and the "King Cobras" were the inspiration behind this story. In the late 1970s and early 1980s in Auckland gangs like these had vicious street brawls – even in New Zealand's main street, Queen Street, before horror-struck late night shoppers.

The original story made statement to the paradox of friendship, where both youths were technically enemies, caught in amongst the lower socioeconomic times athwart with violence, in a racially charged environment, aligning with different gangs. (The Pakeha and Maori between the first generation Samoan youths). By the time Queen City Rocker was filmed the script had been softened for a potential commercial market, as had the soundtrack, and when the film was in the can the reference to real gangs had been lost and the two stars were buddies in the same "group": the term 'gang' had become unpalatable.

The film was shot mostly at night in central Auckland. The riot scene in Queen City Rocker was inspired by the Queen Street Riot, which took place on 7 December 1984 at Aotea Square in Auckland. A free outdoor rock concert turned into a riot in Queen Street that caused over NZ$ 1 million in reported damage. More than 1200 extras were needed for the riot scene. The extras were so worked up that during a rehearsal of the riot scene they destroyed a police car which was not supposed to be destroyed until the actual 'take'. Morrison recalled: "The car disappeared in 30 seconds flat, they smashed every window, the bonnet was off, that was it. We weren't even rolling. We had to get another car." "There was a bit of blood lust going on. Ask people to simulate rioting, it's very hard to draw the line between reality and pretend. And what depressed us was there were a lot of people who were that way inclined anyway. Nice kids, but also an unhealthily large proportion of destructive people."

Queen City Rocker was a finalist at the1988 Listener Film and Television Awards.

== Synopsis ==
Ska is a streetwise 19 year old who is trying to escape from a lifestyle of petty crime and fighting. Ska's sister Fran is a masseuse working for Jay Ryder, a crooked concert promoter with underworld connections. Ska decides to 'rescue' his sister from the massage parlour, but is thrown out in the attempt. Ska and his street kid friends plot revenge by disrupting a big rock concert staged by Ryder, inciting the audience to riot.

== Cast ==
- Matthew Hunter as Ska
- Mark Pilisi as Andrew
- Kim Willoughby as Stacy
- Rebecca Saunders-Smith as Fran
- Peter Bland as Jay Ryder
- Ricky Bribiesca as Sniper
- Pevise Vaifale as Flak
- Michael Morrissey as Manager
- Rob Jayne as Ryder's Driver
- Greer Robson-Kirk as Ska's Sister
- Simon Cornelius as Ska's Brother
- Norman Fletcher as Ska's Father
- Paki Cherrington as Andrew's Father
- Tasi Hunuki as Andrew's Mother
- Joe Tuaimau as Andrew's Brother
- Valesala Tuaimau as Andrew's Brother
- Sialasau Tuaimau as Andrew's Brother
- Charles as Andrew's Brother
- S. Sapolu as Andrew's Grandmother
- Liddy Holloway as Stacy's Mother
- Roy Billing as Stacy's Father
- Chico Morehu as Ska's Gang
- David Clark as Ska's Gang
- Kosta Psarras as Ska's Gang
- Matt Palmer as Ska's Gang
- Trevor Matthews as Ska's Gang
- Raymond Reid as Flak's Gang
- Howie Wikiriwha as Flak's Gang
- Richard Valoa as Flak's Gang
- Jay Taliaoa as Flak's Gang
- Moses Afor as Flak's Gang
- Atu Finau as Flak's Gang
- Telo Malase as Flak's Gang
- David Sharp as Flak's Gang
- Ivan Hope Nye as Flak's Gang
- Thomas Cassidy as Rubbish Truck-Driver
- Martyn Sanderson as Drunk Husband
- Annie Whittle as Drunk Wife
- Dean Butler as Street Raver
- Nicky Ryan as Stacy's Friend
- Frances Chan as Stacy's Friend
- 'Scruff' Peter Ralph as Stacy's Bouncer
- John Davies as Hood
- Brett Allen as Hood
- Llewellyn Nicholson as Hood
- Andy Cave as Hood
- Geoff Dillon as Bouncer at Staircase
- Alisdair Stoneman as 2nd Bouncer at Staircase
- Johnny Bond as Middle-Aged Man
- Bernadette Doolan as Middle-Aged Wife
- Kim Hogan as Ryder's Hood
- Carl Bland as Ryder's Hood
- Shane Dawson as Ryder's Hood
- Philip Jones as Ryder's Hood
- David Foal as Ryder's Hood
- Tony Renata as Ryder's Hood
- Phil Renata as Ryder's Hood
- Karaum Hall as Ryder's Hood
- Rolf Littleby as Ryder's Hood
- Robert Bell as Detective
- Jenni Matson as Constable
- Georgina Monro as Sympathetic Nurse
- Maureen Whelan as Clerk 1
- Andrew Boak as Clerk 2
- David Cole as Surgeon
- Andrea Kelland as Registrar
- Peter Ashford as Bikie
- George Henare as Raving Polynesian Man
- Patupatu Ripley as Raving Polynesian Woman
- Georgina Keenan as Tala
- Paul Minifie as Tala's Customer
- George Spores as Fran's Customer
- Philip Thorogood as Motorcycle Courier
- Anni Sidey as Ryder's Driver
- Aniva Mata'afa-Hanson as Buyer's Secretary
- Bruce Edwards as Barbeque Chef
- Falela Vali as Kissable Girl
- Maurice Keene as Thin Man
- Noel Appleby as Chubby Man
- Ajit Singh as Security Guard
- Janek Musialkouski as Security Guard
- Peter Stephens as Security Guard
- Stewart Porter as Security Guard
- Ardijah as Band at Staircase
- Graham Brazier as Nite Attack Band
- Dave McArtney as Nite Attack Band
- Harry Lyon as Nite Attack Band
- Lisle Kinney as Nite Attack Band
- Ricky Ball as Nite Attack Band
- Simon Alexander as Nite Attack Band
- Shanley Morris as Backing Vocalist
- Julie Mariu as Backing Vocalist
- Georgina Towhatu as Backing Vocalist
- Isaac Lucas as Seedy Man
- Stephen Ross as Man in Street
- Joel Tobeck
