= So You Wanna Be a Rock'n'Roll Star =

So You Wanna Be A Rock'n'Roll Star

Greatest hits album by Th' Dudes
- Released: 1982
- Genre: Pop
- Label: Key

Th' Dudes chronology
Where Are The Boys? (1981)	So You Wanna Be A Rock'n'Roll Star (1982)	Where Are The Girls?: Th' Definitive Collection (2001)

So You Wanna Be A Rock'n'Roll Star is a 1982 greatest hits mini-album by New Zealand band Th' Dudes. It reached No. 27 on the New Zealand music charts. It was later packaged with the Hello Sailor mini-album Last Chance To Dance and released by Festival Records in 1991.

== Track listing ==
All tracks are written by Dave Dobbyn and Ian Morris

Side 1
No.	Title	Length
1.	"Be Mine Tonight"	6:03
2.	"That Look In Your Eyes"	5:09
3.	"Right First Time"	3:34

Side 2
No.	Title	Length
4.	"Walking In Light"	3:34
5.	"Hope"	3:34
6.	"Bliss"	3:34

== Credits ==
- Artwork – Peter Urlich
- Bass – Lez White
- Drums – Bruce Hambling
- Producer – Rob Aicken
- Vocals – Peter Urlich
- Written-By, Guitar, Engineer – Ian Morris
- Written-By, Guitar, Vocals – Dave Dobbyn

== Chart positions ==
Chart (1982)	Peak position
New Zealand Albums (RMNZ)	27

== 1991 repackaged album ==
So You Wanna Be A Rock'n'Roll Star/Last Chance to Dance

Greatest hits album by Th' Dudes /Hello Sailor
- Released: 1991
- Recorded: 1979–1984
- Genre: Pop
- Label: Festival Records

Th' Dudes albums chronology
So You Wanna Be A Rock'n'Roll Star (1982)	So You Wanna Be A Rock'n'Roll Star/Last Chance to Dance (1991)	Where Are The Girls?: Th' Definitive Collection (2001)

Hello Sailor albums chronology
Shipshape & Bristol Fashion (1986)	So You Wanna Be A Rock'n'Roll Star/Last Chance to Dance (1991)	The Album (Hello Sailor album) (1994)

In 1991 a repackaged CD version was released, combining So You Wanna Be A Rock'n'Roll Star with the Hello Sailor's Last Chance To Dance mini-greatest hits. The album reached number 35 on the New Zealand charts.

=== Track listing ===
No.	Title	Length
1.	"Be Mine Tonight" (Th' Dudes)	6:03
2.	"That Look In Your Eyes" (Th' Dudes)	5:09
3.	"Right First Time" (Th' Dudes)	3:34
4.	"Walking In Light" (Th' Dudes)	3:34
5.	"Hope" (Th' Dudes)	3:34
6.	"Bliss" (Th' Dudes)	3:34
7.	"Blue Lady" (Hello Sailor)	4:04
8.	"Latin Lover" (Hello Sailor)	3:03
9.	"Gutter Black" (Hello Sailor)	2:55
10.	"I'm A Texan" (Hello Sailor)	4:27
11.	"Tears Of Blood" (Hello Sailor)	3:48
12.	"Here Comes Johnny" (Hello Sailor)	2:38

=== Chart positions ===
Chart (1991)	Peak position
New Zealand Albums (RMNZ)	35
