= 2006 Reunion Tour Live =

Live album by Th' Dudes
- Released: December 2006 (New Zealand)
- Recorded: October 2006
- Genre: Pop/Rock
- Length: 58:36

Th' Dudes chronology
Pubs, Parks, Theatres, Clubs, Church Halls, Gardens, Lounges & Band Rotundas (2006)	2006 Reunion Tour Live (2006)

2006 Reunion Tour Live (or Th' 2006 Reunion Tour) is a 2006 live album by Th' Dudes during their October 2006 New Zealand reunion tour. The album reached number 39 on the New Zealand music charts.

== Track listing ==
All tracks are written by Dave Dobbyn and Ian Morris unless otherwise stated

No.	Title	Length
1.	"Walking in Light"	4:55
2.	"On Sunday"	4:19
3.	"On the Rox" (Written by Peter Urlich)	4:06
4.	"Take It Back"	5:00
5.	"All My Lovers"	4:11
6.	"That Look in Your Eyes"	6:10
7.	"Right First Time"	4:48
8.	"You Can Make Me Dance"	4:19
9.	"Be Mine Tonight"	6:20
10.	"Bliss"	5:48
11.	"Can't Get Over You at All"	2:48
12.	"Love Me Two Times" (Written by Robby Krieger)	3:52
13.	"Walking in Light (Reprise)"	2:00

== Personnel ==
- Bass – Les White
- Drums – Bruce Hambling
- Guitar, keyboards, backing vocals – Ian Morris
- Guitar, vocals – Dave Dobbyn
- Vocals, percussion – Peter Urlich

=== Production ===
- Edited by Michael McKinley
- Mastered by Chris Van De Geer
- Mixed by Ian Morris
- Recorded by Ant Nevison
- Written by Dave Dobbyn (tracks: 1, 2, 4 to 7, 9 to 13), Ian Morris (tracks: 1, 2, 4 to 7, 9 to 13)

== Notes ==
Live at The St. James Theatre, Auckland, NZ.

Mixed at IG Studios.

== Chart positions ==
Chart (2006)	Peak position
New Zealand Albums (RMNZ)	39
