= Where Are the Girls?: Th' Definitive Collection =

Where Are The Girls?: Th' Definitive Collection

Greatest hits album by Th' Dudes
- Released: 2001
- Label: FMR Records

Th' Dudes chronology
So You Wanna Be A Rock'n'Roll Star (1982)	Where Are The Girls?: Th' Definitive Collection (2001)	Pubs, Parks, Theatres, Clubs, Church Halls, Gardens, Lounges & Band Rotundas (2006)

Professional ratings
Review scores
Source	Rating
NZ Herald	4/5 stars

Where Are the Girls?: Th' Definitive Collection is a 2001 greatest hits album by New Zealand band Th' Dudes. It was compiled by the band themselves and co-ordinated by Simon Grigg.

== Track listing ==
All tracks are written by Dave Dobbyn and Ian Morris, except for "On the Rox" by Peter Urlich.

No.	Title	Length
1.	"Be Mine Tonight"
2.	"Bad Boy Billy"
3.	"Stop Crying"
4.	"Right First Time"
5.	"Tonight Again"
6.	"That look in Your Eyes"
7.	"Can't Get Over You At All"
8.	"On Sunday"
9.	"There You Are"
10.	"Walking in Light"
11.	"Until You Do"
12.	"Take It Back"
13.	"Bliss"
14.	"Something I Don't Need (originally titled 'You Got Something')"
15.	"On The Rox"
16.	"All My Lovers"
17.	"You Can Make Me Dance"
18.	"Walking in Light (Live at 22M)"
19.	"Quite Frankly (Live at Vidcom)"

== Credits ==
- Artwork – Andrew B. White
- Compilation Producer – Simon Grigg
- Compiled By, Coordinator [Compilation Coordinator] – Simon Grigg
- Compiled By, Liner Notes – Dave Dobbyn, Ian Morris
- Compiled By, Liner Notes, Coordinator [Compilation Coordinator] – Peter Urlich
- Liner Notes – Bruce Hambling, Bruce Sergent, Lez White
- Mastered By – Rick Huntington

== Chart positions ==
Chart (2001)	Peak position
New Zealand Albums (RMNZ)	31
