= She Loves Me Back =

Single by DD Smash

from the album The Optimist
- B-side: "What a Day"
- Released: 1985 (New Zealand)
- Recorded: 1984
- Genre: Rock
- Label: Mushroom
- Songwriter: Luther Vandross

DD Smash singles chronology
"Magic (What She Do)" (1985)	"She Loves Me Back" (1985)	"Surrender" (1985)

Dave Dobbyn singles chronology
""Magic (What She Do)" (as DD Smash)" (1985)	""She Loves Me Back" (as DD Smash)" (1985)	""Surrender" (as DD Smash)" (1985)

"She Loves Me Back" is a song written and recorded by Luther Vandross for his 1982 album Forever, for Always, for Love. New Zealand band DD Smash covered the song for their 1984 album, The Optimist, and it was released as the fourth single from the album in 1985. It is the only DD Smash single to be a cover. The song reached No. 36 on the New Zealand singles chart.
