= Devil You Know (song) =

Single by DD Smash

from the album Cool Bananas
- B-side: "White Water"
- Released: 30 April 1982 (New Zealand)
- Recorded: 1982
- Genre: Rock
- Length: 3:25
- Songwriter(s): Dave Dobbyn

DD Smash singles chronology
"Repetition" (1981)	"Devil You Know" (1982)	"Solo" (1983)

Dave Dobbyn singles chronology
"Repetition" (1982)	"Devil You Know" (1982)	"Solo" (1983)

"Devil You Know" is a single by New Zealand band DD Smash. It was released in 1982 and appeared on the album Cool Bananas. It reached No. 35 on the New Zealand charts.

== Alternative version ==
A live version appears on the Dave Dobbyn 2009 greatest hits compilation Beside You: 30 Years of Hits.
