= Beside You =

Beside You may refer to:

- Beside You: 30 Years of Hits, Dave Dobbyn album
- "Beside You" (Van Morrison song)
- "Beside You" (Marianas Trench song)
- "Beside You" (Dave Dobbyn song)
- "Beside You" (James Blunt song)
- "Beside You" (New York Rock and Roll Ensemble song), 1970
- "Beside You", song by 5 Seconds of Summer
- "Beside You", song by Ben Mills from Picture of You (album)
- "Beside You", song by The Crests, Bert Keyes, Billy Dawn Smith 1958
- "Beside You", song by Iggy Pop from American Caesar (album)
- "Beside You", song by The Illusion (band), 1970
- "Beside You", song by Keshi (singer), 2021
- "Beside You", song by The Flamingos, 1960
- "Beside You", song by Jerry Butler, 1968
- "Beside You", song by Nolan Strong & the Diablos
- "Beside You", song by The Swallows, 1952

== See also ==
- Beside Yourself, compilation album by The Church
