= Last Chance to Dance (Hello Sailor album) =

Greatest hits album by Hello Sailor
- Released: 1982
- Recorded: 1976–1978
- Producer: John Coombs

Hello Sailor chronology
Pacifica Amour (1978)	Last Chance to Dance (1982)	Shipshape & Bristol Fashion (1986)

Last Chance to Dance is a compilation album released in 1982 by New Zealand band, Hello Sailor. It reached number 11 on the New Zealand music charts. It was repackaged with a greatest hits album by fellow New Zealand band Th' Dudes and re-released on CD in 1991, where it reached number 35 on the New Zealand music charts.

== Track listing ==
Side 1
No.	Title	Length
1.	"Blue Lady"	4:04
2.	"Latin Lover"	3:03
3.	"Gutter Black"	2:55

Side 2
No.	Title	Length
4.	"I'm A Texan"	4:27
5.	"Tears Of Blood"	3:48
6.	"Here Comes Johnny" (Remix by Ian Morris)	2:38

== Credits ==
- Artwork – Peter Urlich
- Bass – Lisle Kinney
- Drums – Ricky Ball
- Engineer – Ian Morris
- Guitar, Vocals – Dave McArtney, Harry Lyon
- Producer – Rob Aicken
- Vocals, Saxophone, Harmonica – Graham Brazier
