= Together in Concert: Live =

Live album by Tim Finn, Bic Runga, Dave Dobbyn
- Released: November 2000
- Recorded: August–September 2000
- Genres: Pop; rock
- Length: 62:13
- Label: CRS Records / Epic
- Producer: Malcolm Welsford

Tim Finn albums chronology
Say It Is So (1999)	Together in Concert: Live (2000)	Feeding the Gods (2001)

Bic Runga albums chronology
Drive (1997)	Together in Concert: Live (2000)	Beautiful Collision (2002)

Dave Dobbyn albums chronology
Hopetown (2000)	Together in Concert: Live (2000)	Available Light (2005)

Professional ratings
Review scores
Source	Rating
Allmusic	link

Together in Concert: Live is a 2000 live album by Tim Finn, Bic Runga, and Dave Dobbyn during their Together in Concert tour. It was recorded in the months of August and September 2000 in venues around New Zealand. Both the concert and album feature all three performers providing vocal and instrumental backing on each other's songs.

The album reached No. 2 on the New Zealand charts and remained in the charts for 26 weeks.

It was released in the UK on 29 May 2007. On iTunes, Tim Finn's name was erroneously credited as "Tim Funn"; however, this has since been corrected.

== Track listing ==
No.	Title	Writer(s)	Length
1.	"Six Months in a Leaky Boat"	Tim Finn; Split Enz	3:45
2.	"Whaling"	Dave Dobbyn	5:30
3.	"Drive"	Bic Runga	2:57
4.	"Good Together"	T. Finn; Marie Azcona	3:38
5.	"Good Morning Baby"	Runga; Dan Wilson	3:43
6.	"Just Add Water"	Dobbyn	4:51
7.	"Sway"	Runga	4:44
8.	"Loyal"	Dobbyn	4:48
9.	"Precious Things"	Runga	4:23
10.	"Persuasion"	T. Finn; Richard Thompson	4:36
11.	"Something Good"	Runga	3:24
12.	"Language"	Dobbyn	3:19
13.	"I See Red"	Finn	3:59
14.	"Beside You"	Dobbyn	3:50
15.	"Weather with You"	T. Finn; Neil Finn	4:47

== Charts ==
=== Weekly charts ===
Chart (2000–2010)	Peak position
New Zealand Albums (RMNZ)	2

=== Year-end charts ===
Chart (2001)	Position
NZ Album charts	45

== Certifications ==
Region	Certification	Certified units/sales
New Zealand (RMNZ)	3× Platinum	45,000^{^}
^{^} Shipments figures based on certification alone.

== Personnel ==
- Tim Finn – vocals, acoustic guitar, congas, drums, flute, piano
- Bic Runga – vocals, acoustic guitar, congas, drums, electric guitar, percussion, Wurlitzer
- Dave Dobbyn – vocals, acoustic guitar, electric guitar, piano, slide guitar
- Wayne Bell – drums, congas
- Mark Hughes – bass
- Andrew Thorne – electric guitar
