= Last Chance to Dance =

Last Chance to Dance may refer to:

- Last Chance to Dance (Hello Sailor album), 1982
- Last Chance to Dance (Ian McLagan album), 1985
- "Last Chance to Dance (Bad Friend)", a song by A Day to Remember from the album You're Welcome
