= Repetition (DD Smash song) =

Single by DD Smash

from the album Cool Bananas
- B-side: "Arabia By Foot"
- Released: December 1981 (New Zealand)
- Recorded: 1981
- Genre: Rock
- Label: Mushroom
- Songwriter: Dave Dobbyn

DD Smash singles chronology
"Repetition" (1981)	"Devil You Know" (1982)

Dave Dobbyn singles chronology
""Repetition" (as DD Smash)" (1981)	""Devil You Know" (as DD Smash)" (1982)

"Repetition" is a single by New Zealand band DD Smash. It was released in 1981 as their debut single and later appeared on their album Cool Bananas. It reached #25 on the New Zealand charts.
