= The Islander (album) =

Studio album by Dave Dobbyn
- Released: 3 August 1998
- Studios: Roundhead Studios (Auckland); Revolver Studios (Auckland)
- Genre: Rock
- Length: 48:15
- Label: Sony BMG
- Producer: Dave Dobbyn

Dave Dobbyn chronology
Twist (1995)	The Islander (1998)	Overnight Success (1999)

Singles from The Islander
- 1. "Beside You" Released: June 1999

Professional ratings
Review scores
Source	Rating
Allmusic	link

The Islander is a 1998 album by New Zealand singer-songwriter Dave Dobbyn. It reached #1 on the New Zealand music charts.

== Background ==
The album's title comes from Dobbyn's reflection on his New Zealand ancestry: "I've come to terms with the fact that I'm a Pacific Islander a long time ago. There's nothing vaguely European about me apart from the colour of my skin. So I've called it The Islander because it's a stamp of identity."

== Track listing ==
All tracks are written by Dave Dobbyn.

No.	Title	Length
1.	"Waiting"	3:47
2.	"Mobile Home"	2:14
3.	"Hanging in the Wire"	3:05
4.	"Be Set Free"	3:52
5.	"Beside You"	3:43
6.	"Blindman's Bend"	4:44
7.	"Standing Outside"	2:52
8.	"What Have I Fallen For"	3:46
9.	"I Never Left You"	3:24
10.	"Keep a Light On"	3:20
11.	"Hands"	3:54
12.	"One Proud Minute"	5:04
13.	"Hallelujah Song"	4:30
Total length:		48:15

== Personnel ==
Personnel as listed in the album's liner notes are:

=== Musicians ===
- Dave Dobbyn – vocals (all tracks), production (all tracks), guitar (1–12), piano (tracks 1, 5, 9, 12, 13), keyboards (2), electric mandolin (2), synthesizer (3), Wurlitzer organ (4, 7, 8), harmonica (5, 12, 13), bass guitar (7), harmonium (12, 13)
- Alan Gregg – bass guitar (1, 5, 8, 11)
- Michael Barker – percussion (1, 7, 8, 11)
- Ross Burge – drums (1, 5, 8, 11)
- Tom Bailey – organ (2)
- Peter Luscombe – drums (2–4, 6, 7, 9, 12, 13), percussion (2–4, 6, 7, 9)
- Bill McDonald – bass guitar (2, 4, 6, 9, 12, 13)
- Neil Finn – bass guitar (3), piano (3, 5), harmonium (5), backing vocals (5, 6), guitar (5, 6, 12)

=== Production ===
- Sam Gibson – recording, mixing, programming (3), ARP synthesizer (11)
- Ian Morris – mixing and gong (10)
- Deborah Smith, Mark Smith – photography
- Wayne Conway – artwork
- Gavin Botica – sequencing

== Critical reception ==
The album has been described as "quintessentially New Zealand" with Dobbyn at the peak of his talents. It is also noted as a culmination of the directness of his pub-rock DD Smash work and later rock albums, while 'Hallelujah Song' signals the start of his Christian influences in future releases.
