= Blue Lady (song) =

"Blue Lady" is a song released by the band Hello Sailor in 1977 as part of their Hello Sailor album which was the first New Zealand made album to be certified gold, with the top single being Blue Lady. The song is written by the guitarist and lead vocalist Graham Brazier. It reached number thirteen on the New Zealand Singles Chart. This was the band's first album, and featured the line-up of 1975-1980 members Graham Brazier, Dave McArtney, Harry Lyon, Lisle Kinney and Ricky Ball. The band were inducted into the New Zealand Music Hall of fame at the APRA Awards in 2011.
