= Available Light =

Available Light may refer to:

- Available light, sources of light that not explicitly supplied by the photographer for the purpose of taking pictures
- Available Light (album), by Dave Dobbyn
- Available Light (EP), by James McCartney
- "Available Light", a song by Rush from the album Presto
- Available Light (1990 film), a British television film in the anthology series ScreenPlay
