= Hopetown (album) =

Studio album by Dave Dobbyn
- Released: 7 August 2000
- Genre: Rock
- Length: 48:21
- Label: Sony BMG
- Producer: Ian Morris

Dave Dobbyn chronology
Overnight Success (1999)	Hopetown (2000)	Together in Concert: Live (Tim Finn, Bic Runga & Dave Dobbyn) (2000)

Professional ratings
Review scores
Source	Rating
Allmusic	4/5 stars
NZ Herald	4/5 stars

Hopetown is a 2000 album by New Zealand singer-songwriter Dave Dobbyn. It reached number 9 on the New Zealand music charts. The album was produced by fellow Th' Dudes member Ian Morris.

== Track listing ==
All tracks are written by Dave Dobbyn.

No.	Title	Length
1.	"Just Add Water"	3:50
2.	"Alive on Arrival"	4:31
3.	"Feel Someone Else's Pain"	3:12
4.	"A Bridge on Fire"	4:06
5.	"Name of Love"	2:58
6.	"Angels"	2:49
7.	"Background Love"	2:24
8.	"I Am I Am"	4:54
9.	"She Rocks"	3:28
10.	"My Kinda People"	5:15
11.	"Hopetoun Bridge"	4:22
12.	"Kingdom Come"	2:55
13.	"Love Like the Moon"	3:37
Total length:		48:21

== Personnel ==
Personnel as listed in the album's liner notes are:

=== Musicians ===
- Dave Dobbyn – vocals (all tracks), Steinway grand piano (1, 8), Rhodes piano (1, 2), electric guitar (1, 3, 5–7, 9, 10), steel guitar (1), piano (2, 3, 13), tambourine (2), Hammond organ (3, 6), acoustic guitar (3, 4, 7, 11, 12), resonator guitar (3), bass guitar (4), mandolin (4), saxophone (5), harmonica (5), banjo (8), percussion (9), alto saxophone (11), organ (13)
- Ian Morris – production and engineering (all tracks), tambourine (1), synthesizer (1, 2, 4, 6, 9, 13), harmonica (1, 2), effects (1, 2, 12), sitar (3), cittern (4), Mellotron (4), acoustic guitar (5), slide guitar (5), Hammond organ (5, 8, 9), guitar (6, 9), wine glasses (7), backing vocals (10), piano (11), hurdy-gurdy (11)
- Mark Hughes – bass guitar (1–3, 5–10, 12, 13)
- Wayne Bell – drums (1–3, 5–10, 12, 13)
- Mark Dennison – saxophone (2), clarinet (2, 8), soprano saxophone (13)
- Peter Urlich – shaker (2, 7), tambourine (3, 8), cowbell (6, 9, 10), congas (9, 10), backing vocals (10), drums (11), bongo drums (13)
- Marina Davies – backing vocals (3, 9)
- Jackie Clarke – backing vocals (4)
- Murd Polo – drums (4)
- Paul Norman – flugelhorn (7)
- Rick Bryant – backing vocals (8)
- Bella Kalolo, Sela Faletolu – backing vocals (9)
- Julia Morris – backing vocals (10)
- Clinton Brown – bass guitar (11)
- Neil Finn – backing vocals (12)
- Len E. Bylaw – tambourine (12)
- Bela Newly – additional drums and trumpets (13)

=== Production ===
- Chris Van De Geer – recording
- Alistair Guthrie – cover photograph
- Mark Smith – album photography
- Grace Dobbyn – illustration
- Wayne Conway – design and art direction

== Critical reception ==
The album received a favourable reception, with reviewers praising the optimistic and carefree nature of the album. "Just Add Water" was noted as being quirkily reminiscent of Dobbyn's 1986 hit single "Slice of Heaven".
