= Dave McArtney =

- Born: David Ewan McArtney; 5 April 1951; Oamaru, New Zealand
- Died: 15 April 2013 (aged 62) Auckland, New Zealand
- Occupations: Musician, record producer, recording engineer, songwriter
- Instruments: Guitar, vocals
- Formerly of: Hello Sailor; Pink Flamingos
- Website: Dave McArtney & The Pink Flamingos

David Ewan McArtney (5 April 1951 – 15 April 2013) was a New Zealand musician and songwriter. He is best known for his work in the 1970s and 1980s with the band Hello Sailor and his band Dave McArtney & The Pink Flamingos.

In 1989, McArtney returned to university, completing his Bachelor of Arts degree in English literature, majoring in Renaissance poetry. He then went on to complete a Master of Arts (Music) degree in 2013.

He also produced for other musicians (including The Narcs) and composed music for film and television productions, including Incredible Mountains (1983), Queen City Rocker (1986) and Raglan by the Sea (1987). He worked as a tutor at the Music and Audio Institute of New Zealand (MAINZ) from 2003 until his death.

== Personal life ==
McArtney was born in Oamaru on 5 April 1951. His family moved to Auckland and then Wellington in the early 1960s, as his father who was an accountant with ANZ Bank moved with his job. McArtney started studying law before forming Hello Sailor with Harry Lyon and Graham Brazier. He died in his home in Point Chevalier, Auckland, on 15 April 2013.

== The Pink Flamingos ==
After Hello Sailor disbanded in 1980, McArtney formed the Pink Flamingos with Dragon keyboard player and songwriter Paul Hewson (not Bono) and a revolving line-up of players. McArtney was signed to PolyGram records and released their debut album Dave McArtney & The Pink Flamingos in 1981. Paul Hewson left the band, which then released the EP Remember The Alamo and extensively toured New Zealand. The band then relocated to Sydney and signed to Polygram Australia, releasing their second album We Never Close in 1982. Later that year the group disbanded, with McArtney moving to London. Returning to New Zealand in 1984, McArtney recorded the Pink Flamingos' third album, The Catch, released under CBS.

== Discography ==
=== Albums ===
Year	Title	Details	Peak chart positions
Year	Title	Details	NZ
1980	Dave McArtney & The Pink Flamingos (as Dave McArtney & The Pink Flamingos)	Label: Polydor; Catalogue: 2390 112	6
1982	We Never Close (as Dave McArtney & The Pink Flamingos)	Label: Polydor; Catalogue: 2390 116	15
1984	The Catch (as Dave McArtney & The Pink Flamingos)	Label: CBS; Catalogue: SBP 237963	14
1996	The Best of Dave McArtney & The Pink Flamingos (as Dave McArtney & The Pink Flamingos)	Label: Universal	—
2003	Hook	Label: Robin Hood; Catalogue: RH001	—

=== Singles ===
Year	Single	Peak chart positions	Album
Year	Single	NZ	Album
1980	"Virginia"	—	Dave McArtney & The Pink Flamingos
1980	"Pink Flamingo"	24	Dave McArtney & The Pink Flamingos
1981	"Remember The Alamo"	21	Remember The Alamo EP
1981	"Is That The Way"	27	We Never Close
1983	"I'm in Heaven"	—	The Catch
1983	"Dance On"	29	The Catch
"—" denotes releases that did not chart or were not released in that country.

== Awards ==
- Twice nominated for the APRA Silver Scroll in 1981 and 1995.
- Five awards including Group of the Year, Album of the Year and Best Male Vocalist at the 1981 Recording Industry Awards for the album Dave McArtney and the Pink Flamingos.
- In the 1984 New Zealand Music Awards he won best producer for the Narcs single "You Took Me Heart and Soul".

=== Aotearoa Music Awards ===
The Aotearoa Music Awards (previously known as New Zealand Music Awards (NZMA)) are an annual awards night celebrating excellence in New Zealand music and have been presented annually since 1965.

Year	Nominee / work	Award	Result	Ref.
2011	Dave McArtney (as part of Hello Sailor)	New Zealand Music Hall of Fame	inductee	

== Sources ==
- Dix, John, Stranded in Paradise, Penguin, 2005; ISBN 978-0-14-301953-4
- Eggleton, David, Ready To Fly, Craig Potton, 2003; ISBN 978-1-877333-06-4
- Martin, Helen and Edwards, Sam, New Zealand Film 1912–1996, Oxford, 1997; ISBN 978-0-19-558336-6
- Spittle, Gordon, Counting The Beat, GP Publications, 1997; ISBN 978-1-86956-213-7
