= New Zealand top 50 albums of 2001 =

This is the list of the top 50 albums of 2001 in New Zealand.

== Chart ==
Key
‡ – Album of New Zealand origin

Number	Weeks in Chart	Artist	Album
1	45	Linkin Park	Hybrid Theory
2	46	Dido	No Angel
3	46	Robbie Williams	Sing When You're Winning
4	46	Coldplay	Parachutes
5	34	Westlife	Coast to Coast
6	31	Faith Hill	Breathe
7	37	Craig David	Born To Do It
8	36	Nelly Furtado	Whoa Nelly
9	32	Limp Bizkit	Chocolate Starfish and the Hot Dog Flavored Water
10	34	Gorillaz	Gorillaz
11	41	St. Germain	Tourist
12	28	Nelly	Country Grammar
13	24	Shaggy	Hot Shot
14	32	Destiny's Child	Survivor
15	23	Staind	Break The Cycle
16	25	Billy Joel	The Ultimate Collection
17	18	Hayley Westenra	Hayley Westenra^{‡}
18	37	Powderfinger	Odyssey Number Five
19	25	Lifehouse	No Name Face
20	28	David Gray	White Ladder
21	20	Bob Dylan	The Best of Bob Dylan, Vol. 1 & 2
22	18	D12	Devil's Night
23	15	Various Artists	Bridget Jones's Diary
24	28	Eminem	The Marshall Mathers LP
25	17	Lenny Kravitz	Greatest Hits
26	16	Various Artists	Moulin Rouge
27	22	Fur Patrol	Pet^{‡}
28	16	Tool	Lateralus
29	29	Tadpole	The Buddhafinger^{‡}
30	16	UB40	The Very Best Of UB40 1980-2000
31	25	Atomic Kitten	Right Now
32	18	Jennifer Lopez	J. Lo
33	22	The Corrs	In Blue
34	16	Salmonella Dub	Inside the Dub Plates^{‡}
35	17	The Beatles	1
36	14	The Hollies	Greatest Hits
37	15	Che Fu	Navigator
38	10	Dr. Hook	Greatest Hits
39	18	Zed	Silencer Bonus Disc^{‡}
40	26	U2	All That You Can't Leave Behind
41	14	Various Artists	Save the Last Dance
42	14	Simon & Garfunkel	Tales from New York: The Very Best of Simon & Garfunkel
43	14	Bond	Born
44	21	Outkast	Stankonia
45	16	Tim Finn, Dave Dobbyn, Bic Runga	Together in Concert: Live^{‡}
46	12	Diana Krall	The Look of Love
47	15	Alicia Keys	Songs in A Minor
48	16	Travis	The Invisible Band
49	12	Elvis Presley	The 50 Greatest Hits
50	9	The Corrs	The Best of
