= Naked Spots Dance =

New Zealand post-punk band

Naked Spots Dance were a post-punk band from Wellington, New Zealand's Terrace Scene, active between 1979 and 1984.

== History ==
Naked Spots Dance formed in 1979 at secondary school, around core members Stephen Norris (guitar) and Kate Walker (bass). According to Norris, the band was named after the "spots of colour in the blackness" seen when closing one's eyes really tightly (scientifically known as phosphenes). By 1980, original drummer Jeff Smith would be replaced by Phil Harfield, with Jennifer Ward-Lealand joining on vocals. By the end of the year, Naked Spots Dance had contributed four songs to "****", a 1980 Sausage Records compilation featuring four local post-punk acts.

After spending 1981 gigging in Wellington and Christchurch, Harfield and Ward-Lealand left the band. University-trained drummer Matthew Fisher came on board and the band recorded and self-released their first EP, "Certain Ways" in January 1982.

Katherine McRae joined as a singer in May, 1982, and by August they were recording their next EP "New" at Marmalade Studios with producers Chris Fleming and Ian Morris. “New” was again self-released, but Flying Nun Records helped with the distribution and pressing, in part due to Kate Walker’s previous work helping the label’s local distribution in Wellington. Of particular note was the title track, which ends with a prolonged musique concrète collage edited to fit with the groove of the song. Stephen Norris explains, "I did the tape at university as part of my music course there. I carted a tape recorder around town and collected a whole lot of sounds, lifts and trains and things. I spent about fifty hours putting it on open reel and then splicing it up rhythmically using space on a length of tape to equal a certain amount of time." Norris would continue this practice subsequently, both live and on recordings.

McRae was replaced by new vocalist Frances Walsh, from fellow "****" alumnus The Wallsockets. The band continued gigging throughout New Zealand in 1983, earning mixed reviews throughout the year from local music magazine Rip It Up. One reviewer described their set at the Punakaiki Valley Festival as "dour epics invoked a mood of despair among those who knew better." But later in the year, David Taylor lauded their Wellington Theater gig, saying “They’ve lost the uncertainty that has dogged them in the past and presented challenging, hard and rhythmic songs… some nights you just don’t want to go home.”

They released their first album, Falling, on Jayrem Records later in the year. The album featured Walsh’s vocals and more of Norris’s tape work, but "reviews were lukewarm and there was a feeling the group’s time had past [sic]. A second album, recorded in late 1983 at Marmalade Studios, remains unreleased. Naked Spots Dance split in early 1984."

== Post-Break up ==
Fran Walsh, who sang on their final album "Falling", would go on to form a long-term creative and romantic partnership with director Peter Jackson, co-writing most of his movies and even performing the Ringwraiths' "Nazgul scream" in the "Lord of the Rings" trilogy.

== Discography ==
=== LPs ===
- Falling 1983 NSD Records / Jayrem Records NSD-3

=== EPs ===
- "Certain Ways" 1982 NSD Records NSD-1
- "New" 1982 NSD Records / Flying Nun Records NSD-2

=== Compilations ===
- "****" 1980 Sausage Records
