= Walking in Light =

Single by Th' Dudes

from the album Where Are The Boys?
- B-side: "Bad Boy Billy"
- Released: November 1979 (New Zealand)
- Recorded: 1979
- Genre: Rock
- Songwriters: Dave Dobbyn, Ian Morris

Th' Dudes singles chronology
"'Right First Time'" (1979)	"Walking in Light" (1979)	"Bliss" / "On the Rox" (1980)

Dave Dobbyn singles chronology
"Right First Time" (1979)	"Walking in Light" (1979)	"Bliss" / "On the Rox" (1980)

"Walking in Light" is a single from New Zealand band Th' Dudes. It reached No. 50 on the New Zealand music charts.
