= The Sailor Story =

The Sailor Story 1975-1996

Greatest hits album by Hello Sailor
- Released: 1996
- Label: Festival Music

Hello Sailor chronology
| The Album (1994) | The Sailor Story 1975-1996 (1996) | When Your Lights Are Out (2006) |

The Sailor Story 1975-1996 is a two-disc compilation album released in 1996 by New Zealand band, Hello Sailor.

== Track listing ==
Disc 1
| No. | Title | Length |
|---|---|---|
| 1. | "Gutter Black" |
| 2. | "When Your Lights Are Out" |
| 3. | "Latin Lover" |
| 4. | "I'm a Texan" |
| 5. | "Disco's Dead" |
| 6. | "Blue Lady" |
| 7. | "Son of Sam" |
| 8. | "Watch Ya Back" |
| 9. | "Tears of Blood" |
| 10. | "Fugitive for Love" |
| 11. | "Boys in Beirut" |
| 12. | "Dr Jazz" |
| 13. | "I'm in Heaven" |
| 14. | "New Tattoo" |
| 15. | "Black Dreams" |
| 16. | "Upon This Hill Tonight" |
| 17. | "Never Far Away" |

Disc 2
| No. | Title | Length |
|---|---|---|
| 1. | "Rum & Coca Cola" |
| 2. | "Richard Burton" |
| 3. | "Lying on the Sand" |
| 4. | "Vermilion" |
| 5. | "All Around This Town" |
| 6. | "Streetboy" |
| 7. | "Dr I Like Your Medicine" |
| 8. | "Chained All Round" |
| 9. | "You Bring Out The Worst in Me" |
| 10. | "Billy Bold" |
| 11. | "Remember the Alamo" |
| 12. | "Bush by Where You Live" |
| 13. | "Winning Ticket" |
| 14. | "Wretched Youth" |
| 15. | "I'm a Cowboy" |
| 16. | "Dirty Places" |
| 17. | "Last Chance to Dance" |
| 18. | "Sickness Benefit" |
