= Anotherland =

Studio album by Dave Dobbyn
- Released: 1 September 2008
- Studios: On-U Sound Studios (London); Livingston Studios (London)
- Genres: Rock, blues
- Length: 52:50
- Label: Epic
- Producers: Adrian Sherwood; Skip McDonald

Dave Dobbyn chronology
Available Light (2005)	Anotherland (2008)	Beside You: 30 Years of Hits (2009)

Anotherland is a 2008 album by New Zealand singer-songwriter Dave Dobbyn. It was recorded in England with producer Adrian Sherwood and musician 'Little Axe' Skip McDonald. The album debuted at number 2 on the New Zealand Music Charts and was later certified Gold.

== Background ==
Dobbyn was put in contact with Sherwood and McDonald through his manager Lorraine Barry, who had been based in the UK before moving to New Zealand and knew Sherwood well. They were introduced at a Dobbyn gig in London. Dobbyn recorded the album in London over three weeks with his touring band.

== Track listing ==
All tracks are written by Dave Dobbyn, except for "Miles and Miles" by Dobbyn and Skip McDonald.

No.	Title	Length
1.	"At Light Speed"	1:53
2.	"Anotherland"	3:10
3.	"Crosstown Static"	3:13
4.	"Only Love Remains"	2:57
5.	"When the Water Runs Out"	3:52
6.	"Wild Kisses Like Rain"	3:05
7.	"Howling at the Moon"	3:33
8.	"A Long Way Across Town"	3:11
9.	"Deep Calling Deep"	2:53
10.	"Hey Stranger"	3:39
11.	"Instinct for the Blue"	2:26
12.	"The Black Swing"	4:31
13.	"Just What I Need"	3:29
14.	"Be My Guiding Light"	4:02
15.	"Miles and Miles"	2:37
16.	"Arms of Eternity"	4:19
Total length:		52:50

== Personnel ==
Personnel as listed in the album's liner notes are:

=== Musicians ===
- Dave Dobbyn – vocals, guitar, piano, arrangements, cover photography
- Mark Vanilau – piano, Hammond organ, guitar, backing vocals
- Marcus Lawson – bass guitar, backing vocals, harmonica
- Ross Burge – drums
- Skip McDonald – additional guitars, bass guitar and backing vocals; production, horn arrangements
- John Petter – saxophone, clarinet
- Dave Fullwood – trumpet
- Chris Petter – trombone
- Pete Lockett – percussion
- Valerie Skeete, Madeline Edgehill – additional backing vocals
- Ian King – backing vocals (track 1)
- Thomas Quillfeldt – cello

=== Production ===
- Adrian Sherwood – production, mixing
- Brendon Harding, Anthony Leung – engineering
- Kevin Metcalfe – mastering
- Andrew B. White – cover design and layout

== Critical reception ==
Critical reception was generally favourable, with praise given to Dobbyn for moving away from his usual rock roots towards dubstep. Tony Parker of NZ Musician commented that through "unlikely pairing with Sherwood [Dobbyn] has taken the best of what he does and moulded it into something new." Fairfax gave more muted praise, as they saw the mixed results as being "a missed opportunity".
