= Language (Dave Dobbyn song) =

Single by Dave Dobbyn

from the album Twist
- B-side: "Whaling (live) / Belltower (live) / Language (potmix)"
- Released: September 1994(New Zealand)
- Recorded: 1994
- Genre: Rock
- Songwriter(s): Dave Dobbyn

Dave Dobbyn singles chronology
"Don't Hold Your Breath" (1994)	"Language" (1994)	"Lap of the Gods" (1994)

Music video
- "Language" at NZ On Screen

"Language" is a single by New Zealand singer-songwriter Dave Dobbyn, released in 1994 as the first single from the Twist album. The song reached number 4 on the New Zealand charts.

== Background ==
Dobbyn began writing the song while in Sydney. He had originally played "Language" as an acoustic song, however, Twist producer Neil Finn suggested speeding it up and giving it more of a rock sound.

== Legacy ==
"Language" was voted the 35th best New Zealand song of the 20th century by APRA, and featured on the related Nature's Best 2 CD. It was also included on the live album Together in Concert: Live, which was performed with Bic Runga and Tim Finn.

== Certifications ==
Certifications for "Language"
Region	Certification	Certified units/sales
New Zealand (RMNZ)	Gold	15,000^{‡}
^{‡} Sales+streaming figures based on certification alone.
