= Surrey Crescent Moon =

Studio album by Hello Sailor
- Released: 2012
- Recorded: Roundhead Studios
- Genre: Rock
- Label: Warner Music

Hello Sailor chronology
When Your Lights Are Out (2006)	Surrey Crescent Moon (2012)

Surrey Crescent Moon is an album released in 2012 by New Zealand band Hello Sailor. It reached number 35 on the New Zealand music charts.

== Track listing ==
No.	Title	Length
1.	"Bric a Brac Shop"	3:57
2.	"Looking for My Shades"	3:46
3.	"Big Black Bus"	5:04
4.	"Holly and Billy"	3:10
5.	"Black Patch and Pegleg"	3:26
6.	"Bungalow Ave"	3:32
7.	"De Dog"	2:21
8.	"These Furs Were Hers"	2:48
9.	"Good Gun"	3:09
10.	"Under a Surrey Crescent Moon"	3:32

== Critical reception ==
Professional ratings
Review scores
Source	Rating
New Zealand Herald	3.5/5 stars
Nelson Mail	3/5 stars
Simon Sweetman	favourable

Critical reception was generally favourable. Simon Sweetman was the most enthusiastic, calling it "their third best record". Graham Reid of the New Zealand Herald criticised the unevenness of the album, with highlights such the title track and "Big Black Bus" equalled by the low point of "De Dog". However, he noted that even the band's albums considered classics were similarly inconsistent and that when the album "locks into place, that old acidic-but-sentimental magic remains mercifully untarnished."
