= When Your Lights Are Out =

Greatest hits album by Hello Sailor
- Released: 2006
- Recorded: 1975–1996
- Genre: Rock
- Producer: Ben King

Hello Sailor chronology
The Sailor Story (1996)	When Your Lights Are Out (2006)	Surrey Crescent Moon (2012)

When Your Lights Are Out is an unplugged acoustic album released in 2006 by New Zealand band Hello Sailor, which features reworked versions of many of their biggest hits and most popular songs. The album reached number 33 on the New Zealand music charts.

== Track listing ==
No.	Title	Length
1.	"Latin Lover"
2.	"New Tattoo"
3.	"When Your Lights Are Out"
4.	"Lying in the Sand"
5.	"Gutter Black"
6.	"Long John"
7.	"Bush by Where You Live"
8.	"Six Piece Chamber"
9.	"All Around This Town"
10.	"Billy Bold"
11.	"Blue Lady"
