= Love You Like I Should =

Single by Dave Dobbyn

from the album Loyal
- B-side: "2 Fast Cars"
- Released: 11 March 1988 (New Zealand)
- Recorded: 1987
- Genre: New wave
- Songwriter(s): Dave Dobbyn

Dave Dobbyn singles chronology
"You Oughta Be In Love" (1986)	"Love You Like I Should" (1988)	"Loyal" (1988)

"Love You Like I Should" is a single by New Zealand singer/songwriter Dave Dobbyn, released in 1988 from the album "Loyal". The song reached number 7 on the New Zealand charts.

== Background ==
The song was written in 1985, and the lyrics connect with another song from the album about television.

== Music video ==
The music video for Love You Like I Should is of Dobbyn and band performing and features Margaret Urlich.

== Awards ==
At the 1988 New Zealand Music awards, the song was nominated for best single and Dobbyn for best songwriter.
