= Ricky Ball =

- Born: New Zealand
- Genres: Rock, pop
- Occupations: Musician, songwriter
- Instrument: Drums
- Formerly of: The Beatboys; The Courtiers; Challenge; Ticket; Jimmy Sloggett Band; Tommy Ferguson's Goodtime Band; Rainbow; Hello Sailor; Woody; The Pink Flamingos; Beaver

Ricky Ball is a musician from New Zealand. He played drums in the following bands: the Beat boys, the Courtiers, Challenge, Ticket, Jimmy Sloggett Band, Tommy Ferguson's Goodtime Band, Rainbow, Hello Sailor, Woody, the Pink Flamingos (briefly, at the beginning) and Beaver.

Woody (consisting of three-quarters of Ticket among the line up) was a resident band at Jilly's in Auckland, one of several nightclubs in New Zealand run by Maurice Greer, formerly of Human Instinct.

According to Stranded in Paradise, Ricky Ball owned a boutique when he joined the Pink Flamingos and left when they were likely to be more than a resident band at Jilly's.

== Awards ==
=== Aotearoa Music Awards ===
The Aotearoa Music Awards (previously known as New Zealand Music Awards (NZMA)) are an annual awards night celebrating excellence in New Zealand music and have been presented annually since 1965.

Year	Nominee / work	Award	Result	Ref.
2011	Ricky Ball(as part of Hello Sailor)	New Zealand Music Hall of Fame	inductee	
