= Lisle Kinney =

- Born: 3 June 1950 (age 76); Auckland, New Zealand
- Genres: Rock, pop
- Occupations: Musician, songwriter

David Lisle Kinney is a musician from New Zealand. From 1967 onwards he was a semi-professional musician, playing mainly in cabaret bands. He played bass in the following bands: October while at the University of Auckland (Graham Brazier was also in October); Brown Street, the resident band at the Great Northern Hotel; Hello Sailor and DD Smash. He had to leave DD Smash after a road accident. After this however, Lisle played bass with Sonny Day in the Coromandel "Better start saving up" tour of '87.
