= The Album (Hello Sailor album) =

Studio album by Hello Sailor
- Released: 1994
- Recorded: York St Studios, Auckland, NZ.
- Length: 58:11
- Label: Control; Hello Sailor Productions
- Producer: Stuart Pearce, Dave Dobbyn & Porl Streekstra

Hello Sailor chronology
Shipshape & Bristol Fashion (1986)	The Album (1994)	The Sailor Story (1996)

The Album is an album released in 1994 by New Zealand band, Hello Sailor.

== Track listing ==
No.	Title	Length
1.	"New Tattoo"
2.	"Easy"
3.	"Ragin' With The Storm"
4.	"Never Fade Away"
5.	"Stick On You"
6.	"G.M.T."
7.	"Please Tease Me"
8.	"Black Dreams"
9.	"Passion Play"
10.	"Dolly"
11.	"Million S. Hand"
12.	"This Jones"
13.	"Bush By Where You Live"
14.	"Nothing Void"
