= Welcome Home (Dave Dobbyn song) =

Single by Dave Dobbyn

from the album Available Light
- Released: 2 May 2005 (New Zealand)
- Recorded: 2005
- Genre: Rock
- Length: 3:51
- Label: Sony BMG
- Songwriter(s): Dave Dobbyn

Dave Dobbyn singles chronology
"Beside You" (1999)	"Welcome Home" (2005)

Music video
- "Welcome Home" at NZ On Screen

"Welcome Home" is a single by New Zealand singer/songwriter Dave Dobbyn, released in 2005 from the album Available Light. The song reached number 10 on the New Zealand charts.

== Background ==
Dobbyn was inspired to write the song after seeing Christchurch anti-racism protests and the sense of community that came through. The song was produced by Neil Finn.

== Track listing ==
All tracks are written by Dave Dobbyn.

No.	Title	Length
1.	"Welcome Home"	3:51
2.	"Rome"	3:04
3.	"Welcome Home (instrumental)"	3:51

== Music video ==
The music video was directed by Tim Groenendaal. It intercuts scenes in black and white of Dobbyn walking through Auckland suburbs with colour vignettes of immigrants to New Zealand. It notably includes then asylum seeker Ahmed Zaoui, who was appealing a security certificate issued due to alleged links to terrorist groups.

The video finishes with written text on screen: "We come from everywhere. Speak Peace and Welcome Home. Dave."

== Awards ==
"Welcome Home" was nominated for two awards at the 2005 New Zealand music awards. Dobbyn won 'Songwriter of the Year' for the song.

== Legacy ==
Music critic Nick Bollinger praises the song for being intrinsically New Zealand and representing Dobbyn's "perfect New Zealand that we get a glimpse of sometimes". Fellow critic Russell Baillie suggests that "Welcome Home" "captured a mood in the country at the time". Dobbyn performed the song at the funeral of former New Zealand Prime minister David Lange, and the 2006 New Zealand Memorial dedication ceremony in London. When Dobbyn performed the song at the 2005 New Zealand Music Awards awards ceremony, Ahmed Zaoui also appeared on stage.

== Certifications ==
Certifications for "Welcome Home"
Region	Certification	Certified units/sales
New Zealand (RMNZ)	2× Platinum	60,000^{‡}
^{‡} Sales+streaming figures based on certification alone.
