= Beside You (Dave Dobbyn song) =

Single by Dave Dobbyn

from the album The Islander
- Released: 1999 (New Zealand)
- Recorded: 1999
- Genre: Rock
- Length: 3:51
- Label: Sony BMG
- Songwriter: Dave Dobbyn

Dave Dobbyn singles chronology
"Poor Boy" (1999)	"Beside You" (1999)	"Welcome Home" (2005)

"Beside You" is a single by New Zealand singer/songwriter Dave Dobbyn released in 1999 as the only single from his album The Islander. It reached No. 28 on the New Zealand music charts. The song gave its name to his greatest hits album, Beside You: 30 Years of Hits (2009), released ten years later. It was also used on the credits of the film Catching the Black Widow.
