= Hello Sailor (Hello Sailor album) =

Studio album by Hello Sailor
- Released: 1977
- Studio: Stebbing Recording Centre Ltd.
- Genre: Rock
- Label: Key
- Producer: Rob Aicken

Hello Sailor chronology
Hello Sailor (1977)	Pacifica Amour (1978)

Hello Sailor is the debut album released in 1977 by New Zealand band, Hello Sailor.

== Track listing ==
Side A
No.	Title	Length
1.	"Gutter Black"	2:55
2.	"When Your Lights Are Out"	3:42
3.	"Hooked"	2:50
4.	"Last Chance to Dance"	3:11
5.	"All Round This Town"	4:31

Side B
No.	Title	Length
6.	"Blue Lady"	4:05
7.	"Vermillion"	2:34
8.	"Watch Your Back"	3:57
9.	"Big Bump"	3:13
10.	"Latin Lover"	3:04
11.	"Lyin' in the Sand"	2:26

== Credits ==
- Artwork – Peter Adams
- Bass – Lisle Kinney
- Drums – Ricky Ball
- Engineer – Ian Morris
- Producer – Rob Aicken
- Vocals, Guitar – Dave McArtney, Harry Lyon
- Vocals, Saxophone, Harmonica, Acoustic Guitar – Graham Brazier

== Charts ==
Chart (1977/78)	Peak position
Nezw Zealand (RIANZ)	17
Chart (1979)	Peak position
Australian (Kent Music Report)	72

== Certifications ==
Certifications for Hello Sailor
Region	Certification	Certified units/sales
New Zealand (RMNZ)	Gold	7,500^{‡}
^{‡} Sales+streaming figures based on certification alone.

== Awards ==
RIANZ Awards
Year	Work	Award	Detail	Result
1978	Hello Sailor	Album of the Year		Won
1978	Hello Sailor	Best Producer	Rob Aitken	Won
1978	Hello Sailor	Best Engineer	Ian Morris	Won
