= Bliss (Th' Dudes song) =

Single by Th' Dudes

from the album Where Are the Boys?
- B-side: "On the Rox"
- Released: May 1980
- Recorded: 1979
- Genre: Rock
- Length: 3:59
- Label: Key
- Songwriters: Dave Dobbyn, Ian Morris

Th' Dudes singles chronology
"Walking in Light" (1979)	"Bliss" (1980)

Music video
- "Bliss" at NZ On Screen

"Bliss" is a song by New Zealand band Th' Dudes from their album Where Are the Boys?. It was released in May 1980 and reached No. 25 on the New Zealand charts. It has since become a cult New Zealand drinking song. In 2001, the song was voted by members of APRA as the 50th-best New Zealand song of the 20th century and featured on the Nature's Best 2 CD.

== Background ==
The song was written when the band were in Sydney, Australia, and so includes a number of references to Sydney landmarks. It was written as a satirical take on the drunken audiences the band had to play to, so there is some irony in that it has become a drinking song. The song began with the title 'piss' (slang for alcohol), but was changed after pressure from the record company.

== Music video ==
The music video was recorded at The Cricketer's Arms in Wellington.

== Certification ==
Region	Certification	Certified units/sales
New Zealand (RMNZ)	4× Platinum	120,000^{‡}
^{‡} Sales+streaming figures based on certification alone.
