= Shipshape & Bristol Fashion =

Studio album by Hello Sailor
- Released: 1986
- Recorded: 1985
- Studio: Harlequin Studios
- Genre: Rock
- Label: Zulu
- Producer: Liam Henshall

Hello Sailor chronology
Last Chance to Dance (1982)	Shipshape & Bristol Fashion (1986)	The Album (1994)

Shipshape & Bristol Fashion is an album released in 1986 by New Zealand band Hello Sailor. Following the release of the album, the band appeared on the cover of Rip It Up issue 113, which included a review.

== Track listing ==
Side A
No.	Title	Length
1.	"Heaven"
2.	"Kings & Queens"
3.	"You (Bring Out The Worst In Me)"
4.	"Snakes & Ladders"
5.	"Fugitive For Love"

Side B
No.	Title	Length
6.	"Remember The Alamo"
7.	"Billy Bold"
8.	"Winning Ticket"
9.	"Upon This Hill Tonight (Love Is A Dog From Hell)"
10.	"Dear Diary"

== Credits ==
- Artwork By – Peter Adams
- Backing Vocals – Annie Crummer, Herbs, Jaqui Fitzgerald
- Bass – Lisle Kinney (tracks: A5), Liam Henshall* (tracks: A1 to A4, B1 to B5)
- Drums – Ricky Ball
- Engineer – Paul Streekstra
- Keyboards – Rob Fisher
- Mandolin – Brendan Power
- Percussion – Jimmy Maelin
- Producer – Liam Henshall
- Vocals, Guitar – Dave McArtney, Harry Lyon
- Vocals, Guitar, Harmonica – Graham Brazier
