= Loyal (Dave Dobbyn song) =

Single by Dave Dobbyn

from the album Loyal
- B-side: "Saved"
- Released: 1988 (New Zealand)
- Recorded: 1987
- Genre: New wave
- Length: 4:35
- Label: CBS
- Songwriter: Dave Dobbyn
- Producers: Bruce Lynch, Dave Dobbyn, Mark Moffatt

Dave Dobbyn singles chronology
| "Love You Like I Should" (1988) | "Loyal" (1988) | "Defying Gravity" (1988) |

Audio sample
- file; help

Music video
- "Loyal" at NZ On Screen

"Loyal" is a single by New Zealand singer/songwriter Dave Dobbyn, released in 1988 from the album of the same name. The song reached number 19 on the New Zealand charts and has since become a cult song for the nation.

== Background ==
Dobbyn wrote the song in Sydney, with the opening harmonic progression coming about from playing with a newly bought guitar. He co-produced the single, and in retrospect is not entirely happy with the result, preferring live versions such as that from the Together in Concert: Live tour with Bic Runga and Tim Finn.

== Music video ==
The music video for Loyal was directed by Kerry Brown and is a one-shot video of Dobbyn and a woman moving out of a house. It was met with mixed reception and there is some argument about the appropriateness of the imagery for the song. Dobbyn's patterned jersey also received some derision.

== Legacy ==
In 2001, Loyal was voted the third-best New Zealand song of the 20th century by APRA, and featured on the related Nature's Best CD. It was also included on the live album Together in Concert: Live, which was performed with Bic Runga and Tim Finn.

It was used in 2002 as the official song for the defending New Zealand team in the 2003 America's Cup yachting competition. There was some public unhappiness about the song's association with the campaign (especially given the team's subsequent loss). The song was used to bring to light that 9 of the 18 crew members of Swiss-based team Alinghi were New Zealanders, and all 9 were previously members of Team New Zealand between the years of 1995 and 2000.

However, in 2006, voters in an online survey of 3,000 voted it New Zealand's best song.

Dobbyn has noted the adoption of "Loyal" into the wider New Zealand psyche:

It's now got a life of its own. I never knew what that meant—[fellow New Zealand musician] Neil Finn is always on about songs becoming everybody else's—and I never really felt that until that song.

— Dave Dobbyn, The New Zealand Herald, 2001

== Certifications ==
Certifications for "Loyal"
| Region | Certification | Certified units/sales |
|---|---|---|
| New Zealand (RMNZ) | 2× Platinum | 60,000^{‡} |
^{‡} Sales+streaming figures based on certification alone.
