= Outlook For Thursday =

"Outlook for Thursday"

Single by DD Smash
- B-side: "Itinerary"
- Released: 22 April 1983 (New Zealand)
- Recorded: 1983
- Genre: Rock
- Length: 4:04
- Songwriter(s): Dave Dobbyn

DD Smash singles chronology
"Solo" (1982)	"Outlook for Thursday" (1983)	"Actor" (1984)

Dave Dobbyn singles chronology
""Solo" (as DD Smash)" (1982)	""Outlook for Thursday" (as DD Smash)" (1983)	""Actor" (as DD Smash)" (1984)

Music video
- "Outlook for Thursday" at NZ On Screen

"Outlook for Thursday" is a single by New Zealand band DD Smash. It was released in 1983 unrelated to any album, though a live version appears on the 1983 live album Live: Deep in the Heart of Taxes, and appears on Dave Dobbyn's compilation albums. The single charted at No. 3 in New Zealand. and was voted in 2001 by members of APRA as the 31st best New Zealand song of the 20th century.

== Alternate version ==
A live version appears on the 1983 live album Live: Deep in the Heart of Taxes.

== Music video ==
The music video was directed by Andrew Shaw and filmed in Auckland featuring Dobbyn as a frazzled weather announcer. The video won Best Music Video at the 1983 New Zealand Music Awards.
