= Right First Time =

Studio album by Th' Dudes
- Released: May 1979 (NZ); November 1979 (Australia)
- Studio: Stebbing Studios (Auckland)
- Genre: Pop rock
- Length: 36:31
- Label: Key
- Producer: Rob Aickin

Th' Dudes chronology
Right First Time (1979)	Where Are The Boys? (1980)

Alternative cover
- Australian release

Singles from Right First Time
- 1. "Be Mine Tonight" Released: 1979; 2. "Right First Time" Released: 1979

Right First Time is the debut album by New Zealand band Th' Dudes. The New Zealand version was released in May 1979, and the Australian version six months later in November. The single "Be Mine Tonight" is considered one of the greats in New Zealand songwriting.

== Track listing ==
All tracks are written by Ian Morris and Dave Dobbyn.

Side one
No.	Title	Length
1.	"Be Mine Tonight"	6:06
2.	"Bad Boy Billy"	3:05
3.	"Stop Crying"	4:47
4.	"Right First Time"	3:41
Total length:		17:39

Side two
No.	Title	Length
5.	"That Look In Your Eyes"	5:12
6.	"Can't Get Over You (At All)"	2:04
7.	"You Don't Have To Go"	2:24
8.	"On Sunday"	4:47
9.	"There You Are"	4:25
Total length:		18:52 36:31

== Personnel ==
Personnel as listed in the album's liner notes are:

=== Th' Dudes ===
- Ian Morris – guitar, keyboards, vocals, mixing
- Dave Dobbyn – guitar, keyboards, vocals
- Peter Urlich – vocals, album design
- Lez White – bass guitar
- Bruce Hambling – drums

=== Production ===
- Rob Aickin – production
- Denis Odlin – recording
- Max Thomson – album photography

== Charts ==
Chart (1979)	Peak position
New Zealand Albums (RMNZ)	17
