= Available Light (album) =

Studio album by Dave Dobbyn
- Released: 13 June 2005
- Studios: Roundhead Studios; The Surgery (Wellington)
- Genre: Rock
- Length: 39:31
- Label: Epic
- Producers: Dave Dobbyn; David Long; Neil Finn

Dave Dobbyn chronology
Together in Concert: Live (2000)	Available Light (2005)	Anotherland (2008)

Singles from Available Light
- 1. "Welcome Home" Released: May 2005

Available Light is a 2005 album by New Zealand singer-songwriter Dave Dobbyn. It debuted at number 3 on the New Zealand Music Charts.

== Track listing ==
All tracks are written by Dave Dobbyn.

No.	Title	Length
1.	"Intro" (instrumental)	0:34
2.	"Welcome Home"	3:51
3.	"Let That River Go"	3:47
4.	"Pour the Wine"	3:03
5.	"Roll Away"	2:59
6.	"Outrageous Design"	3:03
7.	"Accustomed to the Light"	4:00
8.	"And You Will Lose Everything"	3:25
9.	"It's the Truth"	3:02
10.	"Forgiveness"	3:15
11.	"Free the People"	2:47
12.	"Keeping the Flame"	3:02
13.	"You Got Heart"	3:20
14.	"Drink the River"	1:38
15.	"Outro" (instrumental)	1:05
Total length:		39:31

== Personnel ==
Personnel as listed in the album's liner notes are:

=== Musicians ===
- Dave Dobbyn – lead vocals (2–14), piano (2, 5–8, 10, 12, 13), acoustic guitar (3, 4, 9, 11), electric guitar (4, 7, 9, 10–12), harmonium (5), floor tom (6), backing vocals (9, 12), slide guitar (13), Rhodes piano (14), production, photography
- Neil Finn – acoustic guitar (2, 7, 10, 13), backing vocals (2, 7, 10), guitar with e-bow (2), harmonium (2), piano (3, 4), production (2)
- Bones Hillman – bass guitar (2–14)
- Ross Burge – drums (2–14), shakers (8, 9), tambourine (9, 11), backing vocals (13)
- David Long – electric guitar (2–4, 9, 11, 12), banjo (3), mandolin (3, 4), acoustic guitar (5, 8, 11, 12), vibraphone (7), harmonium (8), Optigan (12), production
- Steve Gallagher – Mellotron (3, 12), glockenspiel (12)
- Grace Dobbyn – backing vocals (5)
- Warryn Maxwell – backing vocals (5, 7, 10), alto saxophone (5, 11, 13), tenor saxophone (11)
- Steve Roche – euphonium (5, 6, 11, 13)
- Toby Laing – flugelhorn (5, 6, 11, 13), cornet (5), trumpet (8)
- Daniel Yeabsley – alto clarinet (6), baritone saxophone (6, 11)
- Bic Runga – backing vocals (7, 10), guest vocals (8)
- Riki Gooch – snare drum (7, 10)
- Jonathan Crayford – Hammond C-3 organ (7, 10, 12)
- Elias Ray Dobbyn – cowbell (11)

=== Production ===
- Neil Baldock – recording, mixing (2), mastering, harmonium (8)
- Lee Prebble – mixing (3–14)
- Andrew B. White – album artwork

== DVD ==
The album was also released with a limited edition DVD. The contents of the DVD are:

1. Available Light - Album Insight
2. Fans on Film
3. Dave's Track by Track
4. Behind the scenes of the Welcome Home video
5. Welcome Home video (with optional director's commentary)
6. Haere Mai Dave

In addition, the DVD contains a hidden "Easter Egg", accessed by scrolling up on the main menu and pressing enter.
