= Loyal (album) =

Studio album by Dave Dobbyn
- Released: 22 March 1988
- Recorded: 1986-1988
- Studios: Mandrill Studios (Auckland); CBS Studios (Sydney)
- Genre: Pop rock
- Length: 50:25
- Label: CBS
- Producers: Bruce Lynch; Dave Dobbyn; Mark Moffatt

Dave Dobbyn chronology
Footrot Flats: The Dog's Tale (1986)	Loyal (1988)	The Dave Dobbyn Collection (1992)

Singles from Loyal
- 1. "Love You Like I Should" Released: March 1988; 2. "Loyal" Released: July 1988; 3. "Defying Gravity" Released: 1988

Professional ratings
Review scores
Source	Rating
Allmusic	link

Loyal is a 1988 album by New Zealand singer-songwriter Dave Dobbyn. After the Footrot Flats album, Loyal moved him further away from the pub rock of DD Smash and into contemporary pop rock. The album "confronts love, loyalty and the power of personal politics." The album reached number 9 on the New Zealand music charts.

The hit single "Slice of Heaven" from Dave Dobbyn's 1986 Footrot Flats soundtrack was also included on the album. Dobbyn commented that the song fitted in with the general theme of loyalty.

== Track listing ==
All tracks are written by Dave Dobbyn.

No.	Title	Length
1.	"Love You Like I Should"	3:32
2.	"Ain't No Doubt (Someone's Life)"	3:42
3.	"Defying Gravity"	3:58
4.	"Hell Takes No Holiday"	4:26
5.	"Stay"	4:40
6.	"Loyal"	4:39
7.	"Slice of Heaven" (featuring Herbs)	4:37
8.	"I Wanna Know You"	4:09
9.	"Little Zeroes"	4:19
10.	"2 Fast Cars"	3:33
11.	"Liberty Bound"	3:54
12.	"Joy"	4:56
Total length:		50:25

== Personnel ==
Personnel as listed in the album's liner notes are:

=== Musicians ===
- Dave Dobbyn — vocals, guitars, keyboards and programming
- Ian Belton — bass guitar
- Tony Buchanan — saxophone
- Ricky Fataar, Peter Warren — drums and percussion
- Bruce Lynch — keyboards and programming
- Mark Myer — drums
- Annie Crummer, Bunny Walters, Margaret Urlich, Mark Punch, Mark Williams, Wendy Matthews — backing vocals
- Herbs
  - Dilworth Karaka, Willie Hona, Charles Tumahai, Tama Lundon, Morrie Watene, Thom Nepia, Fred Faleauto — backing vocals (track 7)

=== Production ===
- Jim Taig — mixing
- Peter Cobbin — mixing (track 5)
- Nick Morgan, Stewart Baker — engineering at Mandrill Studios
- Simon Tonks, David Price — engineering at CBS Studios
- Angelique Cooper — engineering at 301 Studios
- Robin Morrison — photography
- Neale Black — artwork

== Charts ==
Chart (1988)	Peak position
Australia (Kent Music Report)	75

== Awards ==
'Loyal' was awarded 'Best Album' at the 1988 New Zealand Music Awards. Dobbyn was also awarded 'Best Male Vocalist' (for the second year in a row). In 2012 journalist Simon Sweetman suggested that the album cover was one of the five worst in the history of New Zealand music.
