= Lament for the Numb =

Studio album by Dave Dobbyn and the Stone People
- Released: 1993
- Recorded: 1992
- Studio: Sunset Sound Factory (Los Angeles)
- Genre: Rock
- Length: 36:34
- Label: Trafalgar
- Producer: Mitchell Froom

Dave Dobbyn chronology
The Dave Dobbyn Collection (1992)	Lament for the Numb (1993)	Twist (1994)

Singles from Lament for the Numb
- 1. "Maybe the Rain" Released: July 1993; 2. "Belle of the Ball" Released: 1993; 3. "Don't Hold Your Breath" Released: 1994

Professional ratings
Review scores
Source	Rating
Allmusic	link

Lament For The Numb is a 1993 album by New Zealand singer-songwriter Dave Dobbyn and an outfit he named The Stone People—album producer Mitchell Froom on keyboards, bass guitarist Bruce Thomas and drummer Pete Thomas (both from Elvis Costello's rhythm section). The album was recorded and mixed by Tchad Blake at the Sunset Sound Factory in Hollywood. Dobbyn felt that the album was "edgy", but his record company initially called it 'unreleasable', and its release was delayed by a year.

== Track listing ==
All tracks are written by Dave Dobbyn.

No.	Title	Length
1.	"Lament for the Numb"	3:32
2.	"Falling Off a Log"	2:45
3.	"Belle of the Ball"	3:58
4.	"The Expert"	3:47
5.	"Palace"	2:20
6.	"Bring the House Down"	2:57
7.	"Buried in the Backyard"	2:36
8.	"Maybe the Rain"	2:50
9.	"Belltower"	3:59
10.	"Love Over All"	3:01
11.	"Don't Hold Your Breath"	4:49
Total length:		36:34

== Personnel ==
Personnel as listed in the album's liner notes are:

=== The Stone People ===
- Dave Dobbyn – vocals, guitars, piano
- Mitchell Froom – keyboards, production
- Bruce Thomas – bass guitar
- Pete Thomas – drums, percussion

=== Additional musicians ===
- The Heart Attack – horns (tracks 3, 10)

=== Production ===
- Tchad Blake – recording, mixing
- John Paterno – engineering
- Kerry Brown – art direction and photography
- Darryl Ward – disc photography
