= Magic (What She Do) =

Song by DD Smash

Single by DD Smash

from the album The Optimist
- B-side: "Headstart"
- Released: 1984 (New Zealand)
- Recorded: Trafalgar Studios, Sydney, 1984
- Genre: Rock
- Label: Mushroom
- Songwriter: Dave Dobbyn

DD Smash singles chronology
"Whaling" (1984)	"Magic (What She Do)" (1984)	"Surrender" (1985)

Dave Dobbyn singles chronology
"Whaling (as DD Smash)" (1984)	"Magic (What She Do" (1985)	"Surrender (as DD Smash)" (1985)

"Magic (What She Do)" is a single by New Zealand band DD Smash. It was released in 1985 as the fourth single from The Optimist. The single charted at No. 6 in New Zealand. It was written by singer-songwriter Dave Dobbyn.
