= Twist (album) =

Studio album by Dave Dobbyn
- Released: November 1994 (NZ); 8 August 1995 (US)
- Recorded: 1 August – 14 September 1994
- Studio: Revolver Studios (Auckland)
- Genre: Rock
- Length: 40:52 (NZ); 43:53 (US)
- Labels: Sony BMG (NZ); Tristar (US)
- Producer: Neil Finn

Dave Dobbyn chronology
Lament for the Numb (1993)	Twist (1994)	The Islander (1998)

Singles from Twist
- 1. "Language" Released: 14 September 1994; 2. "Lap of the Gods" Released: 20 January 1995; 3. "Naked Flame" Released: 28 July 1995

Professional ratings
Review scores
Source	Rating
Allmusic	link

Twist is the third solo album by New Zealand singer-songwriter Dave Dobbyn, his first recorded in New Zealand after almost a decade living overseas. It was produced by Neil Finn and featured Finn and two members of The Mutton Birds on guitars, bass and drums, as well as contributions by Tim Finn, Don McGlashan and US record producer Tchad Blake. The album was released in the United States with a slightly altered track listing, and some tracks replaced by songs from his previous album. First single "Language" reached number four on the New Zealand charts.

== Background ==
After the struggle to release his previous album Lament For The Numb, Dobbyn returned to New Zealand. Fellow New Zealand musician Neil Finn had also just returned to the country with the ending of Crowded House and was happy to have the opportunity to work on another artist's album. Dobbyn credits Finn for giving the album much of its sound.

== Track listing ==
All tracks are written by Dave Dobbyn, except where noted.

NZ release
No.	Title	Writer(s)	Length
1.	"The Lap of the Gods"		3:59
2.	"Naked Flame"		4:46
3.	"P.C."		3:42
4.	"It Dawned on Me"		2:30
5.	"Protection"		2:56
6.	"What Do You Really Want"		3:40
7.	"Gifted"	Dobbyn; Neil Finn	2:44
8.	"Betrayal"		3:41
9.	"Language"		3:28
10.	"Umm" (instrumental)	Dobbyn; N. Finn; Tim Finn	0:54
11.	"Rain on Fire"		3:44
12.	"I Can't Change My Name"		4:48
Total length:			40:52

The US release featured an altered track list, featuring three songs from Dobbyn's previous album Lament for the Numb (denoted with an asterisk).

US release
No.	Title	Length
1.	"The Lap of the Gods"	3:59
2.	"Naked Flame"	4:46
3.	"P.C."	3:42
4.	"Lament for the Numb" (*)	3:32
5.	"It Dawned on Me"	2:30
6.	"Belle of the Ball" (*)	3:58
7.	"Maybe the Rain" (*)	2:50
8.	"Protection"	2:56
9.	"What Do You Really Want"	3:40
10.	"Language"	3:28
11.	"Rain on Fire"	3:44
12.	"I Can't Change My Name"	4:48
Total length:		43:53

== Personnel ==
Personnel as listed in the album's liner notes are:

- Dave Dobbyn — vocals, guitars, piano, keyboards, noise effects, string arrangements on "It Dawned on Me"
- Neil Finn — guitars, backing vocals, piano, Optigan, keyboards, noise effects, production, string arrangements on "It Dawned on Me"
- Alan Gregg — bass guitar on all tracks except "Gifted", "Betrayal", "Umm"
- Ross Burge — drums on all tracks except "Gifted", "Betrayal", "Umm"
- Tim Finn — backing vocals, percussion, vibraphone, drums on "Umm"
- Don McGlashan — euphonium on "It Dawned On Me"
- Emma Paki — backing vocals on "Naked Flame"
- Bruce Lynch – string arrangements and conducting on "It Dawned on Me"
- Robert Issell — violin on "It Dawned on Me"
- Christine Bowie — viola on "It Dawned on Me"
- Ashley Hopkins — bass clarinet on "It Dawned on Me"
- Miguel Fuentes — percussion on "Naked Flame", "I Can't Change My Name"
- Nathan Haines — tenor saxophone on "P.C."
- Liam Finn, Cameron Lindsay, Elroy Finn — backing vocals on "P.C."

=== Production ===
- Tchad Blake — noise effects, recording, mixing
- Paul Streekstra – recording ("Language")
- Sam Gibson – engineering
- Brian Lee – mastering

== Critical reception ==
Reception was positive. In 2009, New Zealand rock journalist Graham Reid described Twist as "the album of Dobbyn's career."
