= Hello Sailor (band) =

New Zealand band

- Origin: New Zealand
- Genre: Rock
- Years active: 1975–1980, 1985–2015
- Past members: Dave McArtney; Harry Lyon; Graham Brazier; Ricky Ball; Lisle Kinney; Jo Miller; Neil Hannan

Hello Sailor was a New Zealand pop/rock band originally formed in 1975. Although the band formally disbanded in 1980 after just two albums, they have continued to sporadically reunite during the years since; recording a further four albums and performing numerous live tours and appearances.

== History ==
The band's guitarist/vocalists Dave McArtney and Harry Lyon first played together in the mid 1960s.

Their first gig as Hello Sailor was at the Trees Tavern in Tokoroa.

After several lineup changes, the band released its first album, Hello Sailor, in 1977, which went on to become the first New Zealand made record to be certified gold. The line-up at that time was Graham Brazier on vocals and some guitar and saxophone, McArtney and Lyon on guitars and vocals, Lisle Kinney on bass, and Ricky Ball on drums.

Their second album, Pacifica Amour, was released in 1978, after the band had made their first visit to America to try to crack the American market. In 1979 the band left for Australia, but this trip was also not a success. Hello Sailor formally disbanded in 1980.

In 1982, a compilation EP was released, titled Last Chance to Dance. It contained five tracks taken from the band's two earlier albums, plus an additional track "Here Comes Johnny".

The classic line-up came together again within Graham Brazier's early-1980s band The Legionnaires, and in 1985 decided to reform as Hello Sailor (with former Coup D'État bass player Neil Hannan replacing Lisle Kinney). The band released a new single "Fugitive For Love", and a follow-up album Shipshape & Bristol Fashion, which included a re-recorded version of the single. In addition to new songs, the album also contained some reworked material which had originally been recorded during their various solo projects since 1980. Following on from the release of the album, the band toured extensively throughout New Zealand during late 1985 and into 1986.

After another hiatus, the band returned in 1994, recording a new album titled The Album, and again commenced a nationwide promotional tour. Three singles were released from "The Album"; "New Tattoo", "Never Fade Away, and "Raging with the Storm".

In 1996, a two-disc Compilation album The Sailor Story was released. In addition to Hello Sailor tracks, the album also contained material which had been recorded by the band's members during their various solo projects.

In 2005, Hello Sailor's 1977 song "Gutter Black" was chosen as the title music for New Zealand television series Outrageous Fortune. This not only sparked renewed interest for the band, but also resulted in a favourable renegotiation of the publishing rights for Hello Sailor's earlier material.

In 2007, the band released the album, When Your Lights Are Out, which featured all-acoustic versions of their best-known material.

In 2011, the band entered the APRA NZ Music Hall of Fame .

In 2012, the band again reunited to record an album of new material Surrey Crescent Moon.

Founding member Dave McArtney died in 2013.

In 2015, the band were planning their 40th-anniversary tour when Brazier suffered a heart attack. The tour was postponed while he recovered, but he died shortly after, marking the end of the band's career.At the request of Glenn Smith, the band got back together once again in February 2023 and performed a special memorial concert in their small hometown of Waitara, New Zealand.

== Discography ==
=== Studio albums ===
List of Studio albums, with New Zealand chart positions
Title	Album details	Peak chart positions	
Title	Album details	NZ	AUS
Hello Sailor	Released: November 1977; Label: Key (L 36336); Format: LP, Cassette	17	72
Pacifica Amour	Released: 1978; Label: Key (L 36682); Format: LP, Cassette	—	—
Shipshape & Bristol Fashion	Released: November 1986; Label: Zulu Records (ZLP 002); Format: LP, Cassette	21	—
The Album	Released: 1994; Label: Hello Sailor Productions (4713112); Format: CD, Cassette	44	—
When Your Lights Are Out	Released: August 2006; Label: Liberation Blue (BLUE0922); Format: CD	33	—
Surrey Crescent Moon	Released: October 2012; Label: Warner Music New Zealand Ltd.; Format: DD	35	—

=== Compilation albums ===
List of compilation albums, with New Zealand chart positions
Title	Album details	Peak chart positions
Title	Album details	NZ
Last Chance to Dance	Released: July 1982; Label: Key (L 20042); Format: LP, Cassette	11
The Sailor Story 1975-1996	Released: October 1996; Label: Festival Records (D 31672); Format: 2xCD, 2xCassette	26

=== Singles ===
Year	Single : A-Side / B-Side	Chart Peak NZ	Album
1976	"Rum & Coca Cola" / "Casablanca Holiday"	—	Non-album single
1977	"Gutter Black" / "Latin Lover"	15	Hello Sailor
1977	"Blue Lady" / "Lucy's Leaving Home"	13	Hello Sailor
1978	"Lyin' In The Sand" / "Hiding Out"	29	Hello Sailor
1978	"Disco's Dead" / "The Boy We Used To Know"	—	Pacifica Amour
1979	"I'm a Texan" / "Dr. Jazz"	—	Pacifica Amour
1985	"Fugitive For Love" / "Boys in Beirut"	23	Shipshape & Bristol Fashion
1986	"Winning Ticket" / "Shake Shake"	—	Shipshape & Bristol Fashion
1994	"New Tattoo" / New Tattoo (Party Mix) - Dirty Places	5	The Album
1995	"Never Fade Away" / "Blue Lady"	19	The Album
1995	"Raging with the Storm"	—	The Album

== Awards ==
RIANZ Awards
Year	Award	Work	Result
1978	Album of the Year	Hello Sailor	Won
1978	Top Group		Won

=== Aotearoa Music Awards ===
The Aotearoa Music Awards (previously known as New Zealand Music Awards (NZMA)) are an annual awards night celebrating excellence in New Zealand music and have been presented annually since 1965.

Year	Nominee / work	Award	Result	Ref.
2011	Hello Sailor	New Zealand Music Hall of Fame	inductee	

== Book references ==
- Dix, J. (1988) Stranded in paradise: New Zealand rock'n'roll 1955–1988. Wellington: Paradise Publications. ISBN 0-473-00639-1.
- Dix, John, Stranded in Paradise, Penguin, 2005. ISBN 0-14-301953-8
- Eggleton, David, Ready To Fly, Craig Potton, 2003. ISBN 1-877333-06-9
- Spittle, Gordon, Counting The Beat, GP Publications, 1997. ISBN 1-86956-213-5
