= Whaling (song) =

Single by DD Smash

from the album The Optimist
- B-side: "I Met a Loser"
- Released: 28 September 1984 (New Zealand)
- Recorded: 1983
- Genre: Rock
- Length: 3:06
- Label: Mushroom
- Songwriter: Dave Dobbyn

DD Smash singles chronology
"Actor" (1983)	"Whaling" (1984)	"Magic (What She Do)" (1984)

Dave Dobbyn singles chronology
""Actor" (as DD Smash)" (1983)	""Whaling" (as DD Smash)" (1984)	""Magic (What She Do)" (as DD Smash)" (1984)

Music video
- "Whaling" at NZ On Screen

Whaling is a single by New Zealand band DD Smash. It was released in 1984 as the second single from The Optimist. The single charted at No. 8 in New Zealand and number 70 in Australia.

It was voted the 12th-best New Zealand song of the 20th century by members of APRA in 2001.
