= The Optimist (DD Smash album) =

Studio album by DD Smash
- Released: 5 November 1984
- Studios: Trafalgar Studios (Sydney); Paradise Studios (Sydney)
- Genre: Rock
- Length: 46:59
- Label: Mushroom
- Producer: Charles Fisher

DD Smash chronology
Live: Deep in the Heart of Taxes (1983)	The Optimist (1984)

Singles from The Optimist
- 1. "Actor" Released: 1984; 2. "Whaling" Released: 1984; 3. "Magic (What She Do)" Released: 1984; 4. "She Loves Me Back" Released: 1985; 5. "Surrender" Released: 1985

The Optimist is a 1984 album by the New Zealand band DD Smash, their final studio album led by Dave Dobbyn before he launched his solo career. The album reached number 6 on the New Zealand music charts and remained in the chart for 26 weeks.

== Track listing ==
All tracks are written by Dave Dobbyn except where noted.

Side one
No.	Title	Writer(s)	Length
1.	"Magic (What She Do)"		3:48
2.	"The Optimist"		4:05
3.	"Surrender"		4:15
4.	"She Loves Me Back"	Luther Vandross	4:08
5.	"Actor"	Dobbyn; DD Smash	4:14
6.	"Whaling"	Dobbyn; DD Smash	3:43
Total length:			24:13

Side two
No.	Title	Writer(s)	Length
7.	"Open Up"		3:22
8.	"What a Day"		3:33
9.	"Don't Give Up"		3:48
10.	"Guilty Thru Neglect"	Dobbyn; DD Smash	4:43
11.	"Tobacco Indian"		4:04
12.	"Headstart"		3:16
Total length:			22:46 46:59

== Personnel ==
Personnel as listed in the album's liner notes are:

=== DD Smash ===
- Dave Dobbyn — vocals (all tracks), piano (2, 3, 10, 12), synthesizers (2, 6, 11), guitars (2, 3, 5, 6, 9, 11), Sonor drums (6)
- Peter Warren — drums (all tracks), backing vocals (1, 2, 4, 6), percussion (5)

=== Additional musicians ===
- Bruce Lynch — bass guitar (1, 3, 4, 9, 12), E-mu Emulator (1, 9), strings (3), electric organ (9), trumpet (12)
- Sam McNally — synthesizer (1, 2, 4, 8), sequencer (2), piano (4, 7)
- Ian Mason — piano (1, 4), Fairlight CMI (1), vibraphone (3)
- Maggie McKinney — backing vocals (1, 3, 4, 7–10)
- Jenny Morris — backing vocals (1, 6)
- Jackie Orszaczky — bass guitar (2, 7, 8)
- Sunil Da Silva — percussion (3, 7, 8, 11)
- Rex Goh — guitar (4, 7, 8), classical guitar (12)
- Steve Ball — organ (4), Yamaha DX7 marimba (11)
- Cheryl Gray — backing vocals (4, 7–10)
- Mark Williams — backing vocals (4, 7–9)
- The Root 'n Tooters (4, 5, 7, 8, 10)
  - Ralph White — trombone; trumpet (11), flugelhorn (11)
  - Kevin Dubber — trumpet
  - Garry Monks — tenor saxophone
  - Andrew Thompson — saxophone
- Ian Morris — bass guitar (5, 6)
- Gary Langsford — guitars (5, 10)
- Dan Bourke — violin (6)
- Jeff Oakes — tenor saxophone (7)
- Peter Cross — trumpet (7)
- Andrew Clouston — saxophone (10)
- Clive Harrison — bass guitar (10)
- Sharon O'Neill — backing vocals (10)
- Ashley Irwin — Yamaha DX7 bass (11)

=== Production ===
- Charles Fisher — production, drum programming (11)
- Alan Thorne — recording
- John Sayers — mixing
- Okidoke Design — cover artwork
- P.J.M, Paul Clarke — photography

== Charts ==
=== Weekly charts ===
Chart (1984–1985)	Peak position
New Zealand Albums (RMNZ)	6

=== Year-end charts ===
Chart (1985)	Position
New Zealand Albums (RMNZ)	33

== Certifications ==
Region	Certification	Certified units/sales
New Zealand (RMNZ)	Platinum	15,000^{^}
^{^} Shipments figures based on certification alone.
