= Graham Brazier =

New Zealand musician and songwriter

- Born: Graham Philip Brazier; 6 May 1952; Auckland, New Zealand
- Died: 4 September 2015 (aged 63) Auckland, New Zealand
- Genres: Rock, pop
- Occupations: Musician, songwriter

Graham Philip Brazier (6 May 1952 – 4 September 2015) was a New Zealand musician and songwriter. He first came to prominence in the band Hello Sailor. After Hello Sailor, he formed a band called the Legionnaires. When he was growing up, he lived above his mother's bookshop in Dominion Road in Auckland and he collected first editions.

== Early life ==
His childhood was fashioned seeing R.A.K. Mason, Rex Fairburn, Kevin Ireland and other writers in the shop. Graham left Mt Roskill Grammar at age 15 for his first job at Whitcombe & Tombs. He began writing songs when he was 19.

== Career ==
Although Brazier claimed he turned down an offer to join The Doors post-Jim Morrison, it was stated by Doors ex-manager and biographer, Danny Sugerman, to be "somewhat exaggerated".

Two Brazier associated songs are included in the official top 100 New Zealand songs. They are "Blue Lady" alongside his first band, Hello Sailor, as well as "Billy Bold" from his solo career.

It was reported on 7 October 2012 that Brazier was charged with assaulting his two former partners. He pleaded guilty to two counts of male assaults female and one count of common assault.

Brazier suffered a heart attack in August 2015, and died in Auckland on 4 September 2015.

Brazier's posthumous solo album Left Turn at Midnite, completed after Brazier's death by close friend producer Alan Jansson, was released in May 2017.

== Solo discography ==
- Inside Out (Polygram), 1981
- Brazier (CBS), 1987 (spent one week in the NZ album chart at No. 49 in February 1988)
- East of Eden (Wildside) March 2004
- Left Turn at Midnite (Ripe Coconut) May 2017

== Awards ==
=== Aotearoa Music Awards ===
The Aotearoa Music Awards (previously known as New Zealand Music Awards (NZMA)) are an annual awards night celebrating excellence in New Zealand music and have been presented annually since 1965.

Year	Nominee / work	Award	Result	Ref.
2011	Graham Brazier(as part of Hello Sailor)	New Zealand Music Hall of Fame	inductee	
