= Cool Bananas =

Studio album by DD Smash
- Released: April 1982
- Studio: Harlequin Studios (Auckland)
- Genre: Rock
- Length: 39:36
- Label: Mushroom
- Producer: Ian Morris

DD Smash chronology
Cool Bananas (1982)	Live: Deep in the Heart of Taxes (1983)

Singles from Cool Bananas
- 1. "Repetition" Released: 1981; 2. "Devil You Know" Released: 1982; 3. "Solo" Released: 1982

Cool Bananas is the first album by the New Zealand band DD Smash led by Dave Dobbyn, released in 1982. It entered the charts at number 1, purely on tour exposure.

In 2015, as part of the 40th anniversary celebrations of the New Zealand Music Charts, Recorded Music NZ honoured Cool Bananas as being the first album by a New Zealand artist to debut at No.1 on the album chart.

== Track listing ==
All tracks are written by Dave Dobbyn, Lisle Kinney, Peter Warren and Rob Guy.

Side one
No.	Title	Length
1.	"Devil You Know"	3:25
2.	"Bury That Gun"	4:05
3.	"Solo"	4:52
4.	"Blue Note"	4:40
5.	"Repetition"	3:18
Total length:		20:20

Side two
No.	Title	Length
6.	"Silence"	3:01
7.	"Save Yer"	4:33
8.	"White Water"	3:42
9.	"Say"	2:50
10.	"The Gambler"	5:10
Total length:		19:16 39:36

== Personnel ==
Personnel as listed in the album's liner notes are:

=== DD Smash ===
- Peter "Rooda" Warren — drums, vocals, percussion
- Rob "Revox" Guy — guitar
- Lisle Kinney — bass guitar
- Dave Dobbyn — guitar, lead vocals, keyboards

=== Additional musicians ===
- Red McKelvie — pedal steel guitar (track 4)

=== Production ===
- Ian Morris — producer
- Paul Streekstra, Doug Rogers — engineers
- Wayne Robinson — cover artwork

== Awards ==
The album won Best Album at the 1982 New Zealand Music Awards. DD Smash won the same award the following year with their follow up live album, Live: Deep in the Heart of Taxes. The band also won top group of the year, and Dobbyn won Most Promising Male Vocalist and Top Male Vocalist.

Year	Nominee / work	Award	Result
1982	Cool Bananas	1982 New Zealand Music Awards – Album of the Year	Won
1982	Ian Morris for Cool Bananas	1982 New Zealand Music Awards – Producer of the Year	Won
1982	Paul Streekstra and Doug Rogers for Cool Bananas	1982 New Zealand Music Awards – Engineer of the Year	Won
1982	Wayne Robinson for Cool Bananas	1982 New Zealand Music Awards – Sleeve Design of the Year	Won

== Charts ==
=== Weekly charts ===
Chart (1982)	Peak position
New Zealand Albums (RMNZ)	1

=== Year-end charts ===
Chart (1982)	Position
New Zealand Albums (RMNZ)	29
