= DD Smash =

New Zealand band

- Origin: New Zealand
- Years active: 1981–1986
- Past members: Dave Dobbyn; Peter Warren; Rob Guy; Lisle Kinney; Andrew Clouston

DD Smash was a New Zealand pop/rock band formed in 1980 by Dave Dobbyn after the breakup of Th' Dudes. The band briefly used the name "Dave Dobbyn's Divers" until drummer Peter Warren came up with "DD Smash". Dobbyn says the name "seemed to say everything about what we were into, which was having a jolly good time and blasting out music."

== History ==
DD Smash formed in 1980. By late '81, DD Smash signed a recording deal and immediately set about recording their debut album, with Ian Morris as producer.

DD Smash released their debut album in 1982. Titled Cool Bananas it debuted at number 1 in New Zealand and was certified triple gold.

DD Smash split during the mid-1980s when Dave Dobbyn began recording by himself.

In 2015, as part of the 40th anniversary celebrations of the New Zealand Music Charts, Recorded Music NZ honoured DD Smash's debut album Cool Bananas as being the first album by a New Zealand artist to debut at No.1 on the album chart.

== Members ==
- Dave Dobbyn – lead vocals, guitar (1981–1985, 1986)
- Peter "Rooda" Warren – drums, backing vocals (1981–1985, 1986)
- Rob "Revox" Guy – guitar (1981–1982)
- Lisle Kinney – bass guitar (1981–1982)
- Andrew Clouston – saxophone (1982–1983)
- Gary Langsford – guitar (1982-1983)
- Ian Morris – bass guitar (1982–1983)
- Scott Colhoun – trumpet, keyboards (1982–1983)
- Clive Harrison – bass guitar (1984–1985)
- Michael Bartolomei – keyboards (1984–1985)
- Kevin Dubber – trumpet (1984–1985)
- Mark Dennison – saxophone (1984–1985)
- Gary Verberne – guitar (1986)
- Ian Belton – bass guitar (1986)

== Discography ==
=== Studio albums ===
Title	Details	Peak chart positions	Certifications
Title	Details	NZ	Certifications
Cool Bananas	Released: April 1982; Label: Mushroom (L 37832); Format: LP, cassette	1	NZ: Platinum
The Optimist	Released: 5 November 1984; Label: Mushroom (RML 52051); Format: LP, cassette	6	NZ: Platinum

=== Live albums ===
Title	Details	Peak chart positions	Certifications
Title	Details	NZ	Certifications
Live: Deep in the Heart of Taxes	Released: September 1983; Label: Mushroom (L 29016); Format: LP, cassette; Recorded live at the Mainstreet Cabaret in Auckland on 29 July 1983	11	NZ: Gold

=== Singles ===
Title	Year	NZ	AUS	Album
"Bull by the Horns" (as Dave Dobbyn and DD Smash)	1981	–	–	Non-album single
"Repetition"	1981	25	–	Cool Bananas
"Devil You Know"	1982	35	–	Cool Bananas
"Solo"	1982	–	–	Cool Bananas
"Outlook for Thursday"	1983	3	–	Non-album single
"Actor"	1983	–	–	The Optimist
"Whaling"	1984	8	70	The Optimist
"Surrender"	1984	–	–	The Optimist
"Magic (What She Do)"	1985	4	–	The Optimist
"She Loves Me Back"	1985	38	–	The Optimist
"–" denotes a recording that did not chart or was not released in that territory.

=== RIANZ Awards ===
The New Zealand Music Awards are awarded annually by the RIANZ in New Zealand.

Year	Award	Details	Result
1982	Album of the Year	Cool Bananas	Won
1982	Top Male Vocalist	Dave Dobbyn	Won
1982	Top Group of the Year		Won
1982	Most Promising Male Vocalist	Dave Dobbyn	Won
1982	Producer of the Year	Cool Bananas – Ian Morris	Won
1982	Engineer of the Year	Cool Bananas – Paul Streekstra & Doug Rogers	Won
1982	Sleeve Design of the Year	Wayne Robinson – Cool Bananas	Won
1983	Album of the Year	Live: Deep in the Heart of Taxes	Won
1983	Single of the Year	"Outlook for Thursday"	Won
1983	Top Male Vocalist	Dave Dobbyn	Won
1983	Top Group of the Year		Won
1983	Producer of the Year	"Outlook for Thursday"	Nominated
1983	Most Popular Artist		Won
1983	Best Music Video	"Outlook for Thursday" –Andrew Shaw	Won
1983	Engineer of the Year	Live: Deep in the Heart of Taxes–Graeme Myhre	Nominated
1983	Engineer of the Year	"Outlook for Thursday"–Paul Streekstra	Nominated
1983	Producer of the Year	"Outlook for Thursday"– Dave Dobbyn	Nominated
1985	International Achievement		Nominated

== See also ==
- Music of New Zealand
