= Be Mine Tonight (Th' Dudes song) =

Single by Th' Dudes

from the album Right First Time
- B-side: "That Look in Your Eyes"
- Released: May 1979 (New Zealand)
- Recorded: 1979
- Genre: Rock
- Length: 6:20
- Songwriters: Dave Dobbyn, Ian Morris

Th' Dudes singles chronology
"Be Mine Tonight" (1979)	"Right First Time" (1980)

Music video
- "Be Mine Tonight" at NZ On Screen

"Be Mine Tonight" is the debut single by New Zealand band Th' Dudes. It was released in May 1979 as a double A-side with "Walking in Light" and reached No. 36 on the New Zealand charts. Be Mine Tonight won Single of the Year at the 1979 New Zealand Music Awards. It was voted 27th best New Zealand Song of the 20th Century by APRA members and featured on the Nature's Best CD.
