= Peter Urlich =

New Zealand musician

Peter Urlich (born 1956 in Auckland) is a New Zealand musician. He is the cousin of fellow New Zealand singer Margaret Urlich.

== Early years ==
Urlich was educated at Sacred Heart College in the suburb of Glen Innes, Auckland. Son of Daniel and Ruby Urlich, he is the youngest of six children.

== Th' Dudes ==
In 1975, he and Dave Dobbyn formed Th' Dudes with Ian Morris. After Th' Dudes split in 1980, Urlich headed off to the UK where he was fascinated by the rise of club culture. Returning to New Zealand in 1981, he approached writer Mark Phillips and they opened their first club in a run down bar in Auckland's Albert Street. Called "A Certain Bar", it was an immediate success and over the next decade, he and Phillips ran a succession of successful clubs. These were hugely influential in establishing a contemporary club scene in Auckland.

In 1986 Urlich and Phillips were partners in Stimulant Records with Simon Grigg. The label released the album Eight Arms to Hold You, the first New Zealand club music collection.

== 1990s ==
In the 1990s Urlich returned to performing and had residencies in Auckland as the vocalist with The Lawrence Quintet. In 1995 he began a Saturday morning radio show on 95bFm. His initial partner was DJ Phil Clark, however he was replaced in 1996 by Bevan Keys and the show, Nice'n'Urlich, with its mix of Urlich's chat and Key's soulful house music selection, became a hit. Taking the show to clubs also proved hugely popular and for the next decade Nice'n'Urlich sold out increasingly larger venues. In 1999 the duo were signed to Simon Grigg's Huh Records. The three Nice'n'Urlich albums sold over 60,000 albums in New Zealand.

In 1999 Urlich co-starred in a New Zealand reality show, Popstars (arguably the inspiration for the worldwide Idol phenomenon), which was a hunt for people to form a pop band, and to perform and produce an album (the winners formed a band named TrueBliss). His role in the show was that of manager.

== 2000s ==
In 2000 Urlich and Grigg released the first of their Room Service compilations of lounge music, once again for Huh. The three volumes sold in excess of 150,000 across Australia and New Zealand. The Room Service brand was also used on a 1970s soul collection, Soul Food, which went gold in 2003. The pair also compiled Welcome To, a collection of original New Zealand house music in 2001.

In 2002, Urlich launched The P.U.B.E. (Peter Urlich Breakfast Experience) on Auckland station George FM. In 2008, he appeared on New Zealand TV shows Dancing with the Stars and Pop's Ultimate Star. His album of covers of lounge classics, Between You & Me, was released by Liberation Music, in May 2008.

Urlich hosted Nice n' Urlich Saturday mornings on Auckland station George FM, before leaving to establish The P.U.B.E. radio station exclusively on the Radio Schmadio mobile app. He is also the manager of the Pt Chev Pirates, a club in Auckland Rugby League's Phelan Shield.

== Discography ==
=== Albums ===
Title	Details
Between You & Me	Released: 2008; Label: Liberation Music (LIBCD9255.2); Format: CD

== Awards ==
=== Aotearoa Music Awards ===
The Aotearoa Music Awards (previously known as New Zealand Music Awards (NZMA)) are an annual awards night celebrating excellence in New Zealand music and have been presented annually since 1965.

Year	Nominee / work	Award	Result	Ref.
2019	Peter Urlich (as part of Th' Dudes)	New Zealand Music Hall of Fame	inductee	
