= Th' Dudes =

New Zealand rock band

Th'Dudes
- Origin: Auckland, New Zealand
- Genre: Rock
- Years active: 1975–1980, 2006–2008, 2019-present
- Members: Dave Dobbyn; Rikki Morris; Peter Urlich; Lez White; Bruce Hambling
- Past members: Ian Morris (deceased); Peter Coleman

Th' Dudes are a New Zealand rock band that was formed in the late 1970s in Auckland, New Zealand. Hits include "Walking in Light", "Right First Time", "Be Mine Tonight" and "Bliss".

== History ==
=== 1975–1980 ===
The band was formed by Morris, Urlich, Coleman and Dobbyn, students at Sacred Heart College in Auckland. The band name derived from the "Lone Groover" comic strip in the English music paper, NME.

=== 1990s–present ===
In October 2006, Th' Dudes embarked on a tour of New Zealand as part of Radio Hauraki's 40th anniversary celebrations. The band compiled a six-track album of demo and alternate versions of their biggest hits, culled from the band's own collections. This CD was available only at shows on the tour and was called Pubs, Parks, Theatres, Clubs, Church Halls, Gardens, Lounges & Band Rotundas.

In 2008, the band sued Stebbing Studios for non-payment of royalties. The band sought to show that they were not paid royalties for sales of their music due to their songs being recorded in downtime at Stebbing, but studio owner Eldred Stebbing claimed production costs had not been met. The dispute was resolved to both parties' mutual satisfaction in November 2008.

In 2019, the band announced a new tour of New Zealand, with dates from 9–25 April 2020, but it was postponed until November due to the COVID-19 pandemic. Ian Morris's brother, Rikki Morris joined the group for the tour.

Ian Morris died suddenly in Napier on 7 October 2010.

== Members ==
- Dave Dobbyn – vocals, guitars
- Ian Morris (deceased) – guitars, keyboards, backing vocals
- Peter Urlich – drums (changing to vocals later)
- Peter Coleman (1976-1978) – bass
- Lez White - bass
- Bruce Hambling – drums
- Rikki Morris - guitar, vocals

== Discography ==
=== Studio albums ===
List of studio albums, with New Zealand chart positions
Title	Year	Album	Peak chart positions
Title	Year	Album	NZ
1979	Right First Time	Label: Key (L 36685); Format: LP, Cassette	17
1980	Where Are the Boys?	Label: Key (L 37018); Format: LP, Cassette	–

=== Live albums ===
List of live albums, with New Zealand chart positions
Year	Title	Album	Peak chart positions
Year	Title	Album	NZ
2006	Th' 2006 Reunion Tour Live	Label: Red Trolley Records (RTCD002); Format: CD	39

=== Compilation albums ===
List of compilation albums, with New Zealand chart positions
Year	Title	Album	Peak chart positions
Year	Title	Album	NZ
1982	So You Wanna Be a Rock'n'Roll Star	Label: Key (L 20041); Format: LP, Cassette	27
2001	Where Are the Girls?: Th' Definitive Collection	Label: Festival Mushroom Records (DUDES2001); Format: CD	31
2020	Bliss On Wax	Label: Stebbing Recording Centre Ltd. (910523); Format: CD, LP, streaming, DD	7

=== Demo albums ===
List of demo albums
Year	Title	Album details
2006	Pubs, Parks, Theatres, Clubs, Church Halls, Gardens, Lounges & Band Rotundas	Label: self-released; Format: CD

=== Singles ===
List of singles with selected New Zealand positions
Title	Year	Peak chart positions	Album
Title	Year	NZ	Album
1979	"Be Mine Tonight" / "That Look in Your Eyes"	36	Right First Time
1979	"Right First Time" / "Tonight Again"	34	Right First Time
1979	"Walking in Light" / "Bad Boy Billy"	50	Where Are the Boys
1980	"Bliss" / "On the Rox"	25	Where Are the Boys
2010	"Bliss 2010" (vs. Jolyon Petch & Sam Hill)	–	Non-album single

== Awards and nominations ==
=== Aotearoa Music Awards ===
The Aotearoa Music Awards (previously known as New Zealand Music Awards (NZMA)) are an annual awards night celebrating excellence in New Zealand music and have been presented annually since 1965.

Year	Nominee / work	Award	Result	Ref.
2019	Th' Dudes	New Zealand Music Hall of Fame	inductee	
