= Dave Dobbyn =

New Zealand musician and producer (born 1957)

Sir Dave Dobbyn KNZM
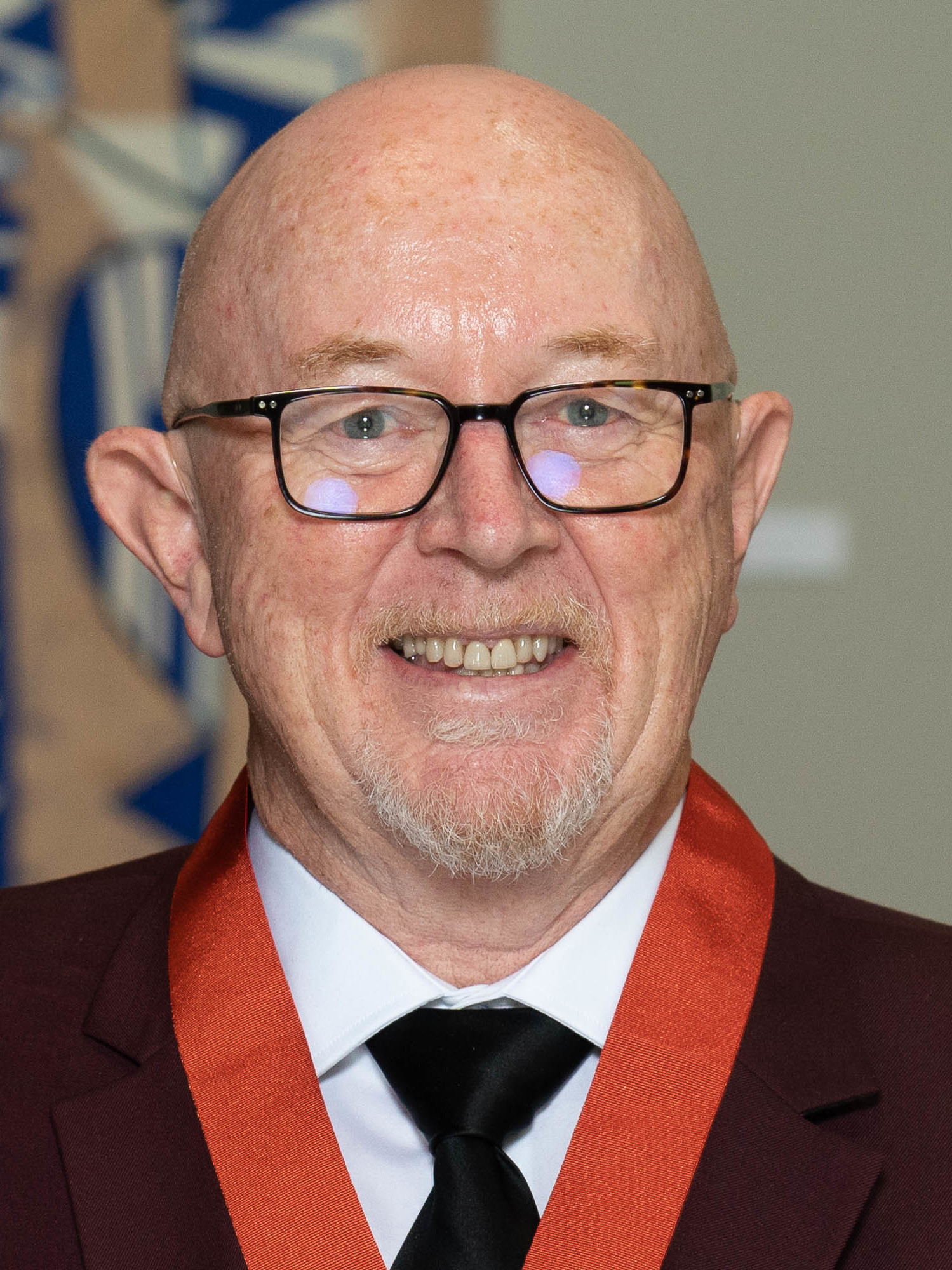
- Dobbyn in April 2021

Background information
- Also known as: Dave Dobbyn
- Born: David Joseph Dobbyn; 3 January 1957 (age 69); Auckland, New Zealand
- Genres: Pop, rock
- Occupations: Singer, songwriter
- Instruments: Vocals, guitar, piano, bass
- Years active: 1979–present
- Labels: Warner, Epic, Sony BMG
- Website: davedobbyn.co.nz

Sir David Joseph Dobbyn KNZM (born 3 January 1957) is a New Zealand musician, singer–songwriter and record producer. In his early career he was a member of the rock group Th' Dudes and was the main creative force in pop band DD Smash. Since then he has released the majority of his recordings as a solo performer.

== Early life ==
Dave Dobbyn was born on 3 January 1957 in the working class suburb of Glen Innes, Auckland, the third of five children to tour-bus driver Terry Dobbyn and Molly. He was influenced by music from a young age, ranging from the Irish songs his father listened to, to the music of the church across the road, to the various radio stations he was able to pick up on the family radiogram.

While his family had a piano at home, he was the only member to not receive piano lessons, something he was grateful for in retrospect as it meant he was able to come to it without memories of strict lessons. He and his three brothers attended local Catholic school Sacred Heart College, where he met Ian Morris and Peter Urlich. Though Sacred Heart actively encouraged music, Dobbyn was too shy to be involved.

After finishing high school he worked nine months as a bank teller, and applied for teachers' college twice, being accepted on the second try. As he started teachers' college he was asked by Morris and Urlich to join the band that would become Th' Dudes.

== Musical career ==
=== Th' Dudes (1975–1980) ===
Dobbyn's first success came with rock band, Th' Dudes, which he joined as guitarist. After performing with the band for a year, Dobbyn quit teachers' college to focus on the band full-time. Dobbyn suffered extreme stage fright and played early performances standing at the back with his eyes closed. However, he took on the role of frontman for the song "Be Mine Tonight" (1978). The song won single of the year in 1979 in New Zealand and led to many critics seeing him as the breakout star of the band. The band's 1980 song "Bliss" (1980) has become an iconic New Zealand drinking song.

=== DD Smash (1980–1986) ===
After Th' Dudes disbanded in 1980, Dobbyn formed a pop group DD Smash. The band's first release was the single "Lipstick Power", followed by "Bull by the Horns" (1981), thought to be about Dobbyn overcoming the stage fright he sometimes experienced while performing with Th' Dudes. Their first album Cool Bananas (1982) debuted in the New Zealand charts at number one.

After Cool Bananas, DD Smash released Deep in the Heart of Taxes (1983), an album recorded live at Auckland's popular eighties venue Mainstreet. Their final album, The Optimist (1984), although slicker sounding production-wise than its predecessor, showed signs of compromise with the dominant commercial, blue-eyed soul inflected, synth-pop sound of the post-new wave era of British and Australian music which was flooding the New Zealand charts at the time. Dobbyn apparently had his eye on the larger Australian market and it was not long before he had a number one solo hit there.

In December 1984, DD Smash was playing an outdoor concert in Aotea Square in Auckland. During their set, a power failure led sections of the crowd to become restless. Some of the crowd started throwing beer bottles and police arrested them. The situation escalated and the riot squad was called in. Dobbyn made negative remarks about the police which allegedly spurred on the crowd. The concert was stopped by the police and sections of the crowd rioted, smashing shop windows along Queen Street. Prime Minister David Lange called a commission of inquiry and as a result, Dobbyn was charged with inciting a riot. The criminal prosecution against Dobbyn began in June 1985. His lawyer successfully defended him and he was acquitted on the charge of "behaving in a manner likely to cause violence against person or property and using insulting language".

When DD Smash eventually disbanded, partially to make room for the commercially expanding vision of Dobbyn, they left behind them the hit singles "Outlook for Thursday" (1983) and the violin-tinged, hi perennial classic "Whaling" (1984).

=== Solo career (1986–present) ===
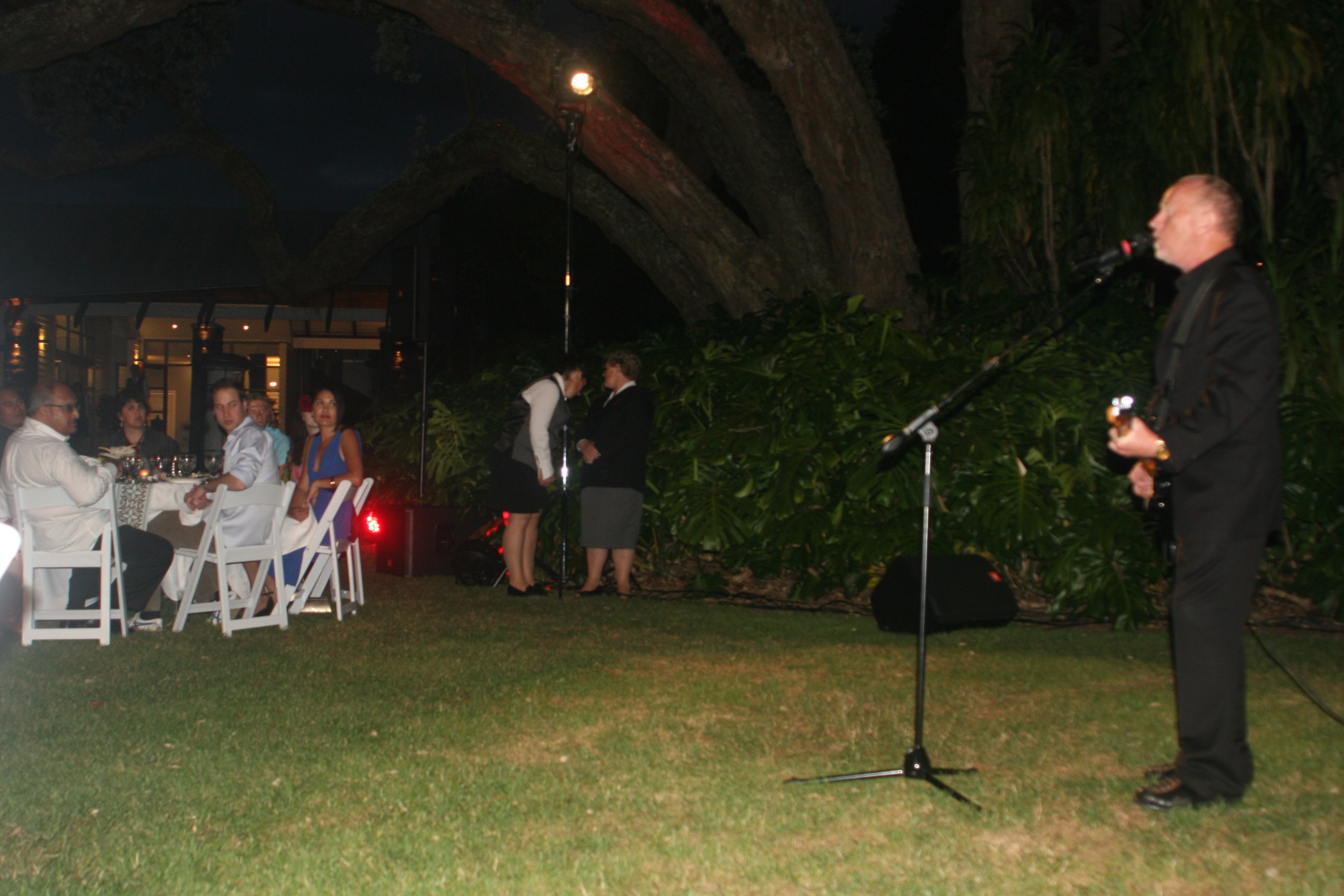
Dobbyn performing for Governor-General Anand Satyanand and Prince William in 2010

Dobbyn song performed as part of the Pike29 Memorial Track construction start (0:48 to 1:20 min)

When DD Smash folded, Dobbyn began a successful solo career, by writing the soundtrack music for the animated feature film Footrot Flats: The Dog's Tale in 1986. The film yielded two hit singles: "You Oughta Be In Love" (1986) and the chart-topping "Slice of Heaven" (1986) recorded with the band Herbs. After the release of the film, "Slice of Heaven" became one of Dobbyn's best-known songs, frequently used in tourism advertisements aired on Australian television that encouraged people to visit New Zealand. With the success of the song in Australia, Dobbyn settled in Australia.

In April 1987, a re-worked version of Dobbyn's song "Slice of Heaven" featured in a number of television commercials in Australia. Funded by the Australian Meat Industry Council (AMIC), the commercials promoted the Devon meat product by substituting the word "Heaven" for "Devon" in the chorus.

Dobbyn released his debut solo album Loyal, a personal celebration of love and loyalty, in 1988. His follow-up was the Mitchell Froom-produced Lament for the Numb (1993), which included members of Elvis Costello's one-time backing band. The album was called "un-releasable" by Dobbyn's record label at the time and was shelved for a year until its eventual release. After nearly a decade in Australia, Dobbyn moved back to Auckland in the early 1990s, and made 1994's Twist with fellow New Zealander and recently returned singer–songwriter Neil Finn, whose contribution Dobbyn stated "was crucial to the sound of that record". Twist is also notable for its inclusion of the Māori singer Emma Paki, who was popular in the country at the time of the album's release.

In 1995 Dobbyn became one of the first musical performers in the world to simulcast a performance on the Internet. However, it was hindered by technical problems.

Dobbyn took on the role of producer in fourth solo album, The Islander. The album received widespread popular and critical acclaim, reaching number 1 on the New Zealand charts.

In 1999 Dobbyn joined Jan Hellriegel and Toi Iti to co-write "Read About It", the theme song of the Duffy Books in Homes programme which is still performed by 100,000 children annually.

Dobbyn's hit song "Loyal" (1988) from his debut solo album Loyal (1988) was used as an anthem for Team New Zealand's failed 2003 America's Cup defence. He has also produced albums for Australian singer Grant McLennan and contributed to albums by Jenny Morris, Gyan Evans, Wayne Gillespie and Bic Runga. In 2000 Dobbyn toured New Zealand with Runga and Tim Finn. The tour was recorded and the live album, Together in Concert: Live (2000) was released soon after. The tour also included the lead off song "Just Add Water" from his 2000 album Hopetown, a record Dobbyn has since referred to as "a cartoon album".

In 2005, Dobbyn released his sixth solo album; Available Light. The album received popular and critical acclaim. In the same year Dobbyn performed the lead single from Available Light, "Welcome Home" (2005) at the New Zealand Music Awards ceremony. During the performance, Ahmed Zaoui, who was appealing a security certificate issued due to alleged links to terrorist groups, appeared on stage with Dobbyn.

2008 saw Dobbyn release Anotherland. The album entered the NZ Top 40 Album Charts at Number 2 and remained in the charts for 6 weeks, eventually attaining Gold status.

In 2009 Dobbyn released a second greatest hits album, including re-recorded versions of "Devil You Know", "Shaky Isles" and "Whaling". The second CD includes less known songs. A limited-edition version also included a DVD tracking his three decades in music, and included interviews with former bandmates and collaborators.

In 2012 Dobbyn was part of the all-star lineup for the Flight of the Conchords charity single "Feel Inside (And Stuff Like That)". The song debuted at number 1 on the New Zealand music chart and remained there for two weeks.

== Discography ==
=== Studio albums ===
Title	Details	Peak chart positions		Certifications
Title	Details	NZ	AUS	Certifications
Loyal	Released: 22 March 1988; Label: CBS (460655 2); Format: LP, CD	9	75	NZ: Gold
Lament for the Numb	Released: 1993; Label: Warner Music Group (450992330-2); Format: CD	13	–	
Twist	Released: November 1994; Label: Epic (477792-2); Format: CD	8	–	
The Islander	Released: 3 August 1998; Label: Columbia (491456-2); Format: CD, cassette	1	–	NZ: Gold
Hopetown	Released: 7 August 2000; Label: Epic (498886.2); Format: CD	9	–	NZ: Gold
Available Light	Released: 13 June 2005; Label: Epic (5202672000); Format: CD	3	–	NZ: 2× Platinum
Anotherland	Released: 1 September 2008; Label: Epic (88697327202); Format: CD	2	–	NZ: Gold
Harmony House	Released: 11 March 2016; Label: Red Trolley (RTCD004); Format: CD, LP	5	–	
"–" denotes a recording that did not chart or was not released in that territory.

=== Soundtrack albums ===
Title	Details	Peak chart positions		Certifications
Title	Details	NZ	AUS	Certifications
Footrot Flats: The Dog's Tale	Released: 14 November 1986; Label: Magpie (MAGLP001); Format: LP, CD	5	22	NZ: 2× Platinum

=== Live albums ===
Title	Details	Peak chart positions	Certification
Title	Details	NZ	Certification
Together in Concert: Live	Tim Finn, Dave Dobbyn & Bic Runga; Released: November 2000; Label: Epic (5011402000); Format: CD; Recorded in August–September 2000	2	NZ: 3× Platinum

=== Compilation albums ===
Title	Details	Peak chart positions	Certifications
Title	Details	NZ	Certifications
The Dave Dobbyn Collection	Released: 1992; Label: Festival (C30733); Format: CD	4	
Overnight Success: The Definitive Dave Dobbyn Collection	Released: 1999; Label: Columbia (496084.2); Format: CD	15	NZ: 2× Platinum
Beside You: 30 Years of Hits	Released: 2009; Label: Epic (88697602489); Format: 2CD	4	
A Slice of Heaven: 40 Years of Hits	Released: 7 April 2017; Label: Sony Music (88985430712); Format: CD	2	

=== Singles ===
Title	Year	Peak chart positions		Album
Title	Year	NZ	AUS	Album
"Lipstick Power"	1981	—	—	Non-album singles
"Bull by the Horns" (Dave Dobbyn and DD Smash)	1981	—	—	Non-album singles
"Slice of Heaven" (Dave Dobbyn with Herbs)	1986	1	1	Footrot Flats: The Dog's Tale
"You Oughta Be in Love"	1986	2	63	Footrot Flats: The Dog's Tale
"Sailing Away" (All of Us)	1986	1	—	Non-album single
"Love You Like I Should"	1988	7	70	Loyal
"Loyal"	1988	19	70	Loyal
"Space Junk" (Dave Dobbyn and the Lunettes)	1989	32	—	Non-album singles
"Shaky Isles"	1991	26	—	Non-album singles
"Maybe the Rain" (Dave Dobbyn and the Stone People)	1993	40	—	Lament for the Numb
"Don't Hold Your Breath" (Dave Dobbyn and the Stone People)	1993	—	—	Lament for the Numb
"Language"	1994	4	—	Twist
"Lap of the Gods"	1995	13	—	Twist
"Naked Flame"	1995	20	—	Twist
"Poor Boy" (ENZSO – lead vocals by Dave Dobbyn)	1996	29	—	Enzso
"Waiting"	1998	—	—	The Islander
"Hanging in the Wire"	1998	—	—	The Islander
"Beside You"	1999	28	—	The Islander
"The New Outlook" (with Dark Tower)	1999	50	–	Non-album single
"Just Add Water"	2000	—	—	Hopetown
"My Kinda People"	2000	—	—	Hopetown
"Welcome Home"	2005	10	—	Available Light
"Pour the Wine"	2005	—	—	Available Light
"You Got Heart"	2006	—	—	Available Light
"Wild Kisses Like Rain"	2008	—	—	Anotherland
"Feel Inside (And Stuff Like That)" (Flight of the Conchords)	2012	1	—	Non-album singles
"This Love" (Dave Dobbyn and the Orpheus Choir of Wellington)	2014	—	—	Non-album singles
"Team, Ball, Player, Thing" (#KiwisCureBatten featuring Lorde, Kimbra, Brooke Fraser, and others)	2015	2	—	Non-album singles
"Angelina"	2016	—	—	Harmony House
"Tell the World"	2016	—	—	Harmony House
"Nau Mai Rā (Welcome Home)"	2017	— (Note: "Nau Mai Rā (Welcome Home)" did not enter the NZ Top 40 Singles Chart, but peaked at number two on the NZ Heatseekers Singles Chart.)	—	Non-album singles
"Hine Ruhi (Slice of Heaven)"	2021	—	—	Non-album singles
"–" denotes a recording that did not chart or was not released in that territory.

== Awards and nominations ==
Dobbyn has received numerous musical awards from both the New Zealand Music Awards and the APRA Silver Scroll Awards. In the 2003 New Year Honours, he was appointed an Officer of the New Zealand Order of Merit, for services to music. In the 2021 New Year Honours, Dobbyn was promoted to Knight Companion of the New Zealand Order of Merit, for services to music.

=== RIANZ Awards ===
The New Zealand Music Awards are awarded annually by the RIANZ in New Zealand. As of 2012, Dobbyn has won 23 awards.

Year	Award	Work	With	Result
1979	Single of the Year	"Be Mine Tonight"	Th' Dudes	Won
1979	Top Group		Th' Dudes	Won
1982	Album of the Year	Cool Bananas	DD Smash	Won
1982	Top Male Vocalist		DD Smash	Won
1982	Top Group of the Year		DD Smash	Won
1982	Most Promising Male Vocalist		DD Smash	Won
1983	Album of the Year	Live: Deep in the Heart of Taxes	DD Smash	Won
1983	Single of the Year	"Outlook for Thursday"	DD Smash	Won
1983	Top Male Vocalist		DD Smash	Won
1983	Top Group of the Year		DD Smash	Won
1983	Producer of the Year	"Outlook for Thursday"	DD Smash	Nominated
1983	Most Popular Artist		DD Smash	Won
1985	International Achievement		DD Smash	Nominated
1986	Best Song of the Year	"Slice of Heaven"	solo	Won
1987	Album of the Year	Footrot Flats	solo	Nominated
1987	Single of the Year	"You Oughta Be in Love"	solo	Won
1987	Best Male Vocalist		solo	Won
1987	International Achievement		solo	Nominated
1987	Best Film Soundtrack	Footrot Flats	solo	Won
1987	Best Producer	Footrot Flats	solo	Won
1987	Best Songwriter	"You Oughta Be in Love"	solo	Nominated
1988	Album of the Year	Loyal	solo	Won
1988	Single of the Year	"Love You Like I Should"	solo	Nominated
1988	Best Male Vocalist		solo	Won
1988	Best Songwriter	"Love You Like I Should"	solo	Nominated
1995	Album of the Year	Twist	solo	Nominated
1995	Best Male Vocalist	Twist	solo	Won
1995	Best Songwriter	'Language'	solo	Won
1996	Best Male Vocalist		solo	Nominated
1996	International Achievement		solo	Nominated
1999	Top Male Vocalist		solo	Nominated
1999	Best Songwriter	"Beside You"	solo	Nominated
2000	Top Male Vocalist		solo	Nominated
2000	Best Film Soundtrack/Cast Recording/Compilation	Overnight Success	solo	Won
2001	Album of the Year	Hopetown	solo	Nominated
2001	Album of the Year	Together in Concert: Live	Tim Finn, Bic Runga	Nominated
2001	Top Male Vocalist		solo	Nominated
2002	Best Cast Recording/Compilation	Where Are the Girls?: Th' Definitive Collection	Th' Dudes	Nominated
2005	Single of the Year	"Welcome Home"	solo	Nominated
2005	Songwriter of the Year	"Welcome Home"	solo	Won
2006	Album of the Year	Available Light	solo	Nominated
2006	Best Male Solo Artist	Available Light	solo	Won
2009	Best Male Solo Artist		solo	Nominated
2013	New Zealand Music Hall of Fame	himself	solo	inductee
2019	New Zealand Music Hall of Fame	himself	as part of Th' Dudes	inductee

=== APRA Awards ===
As of 2013, Dobbyn has won four Silver Scroll Awards: three for the Silver Scroll Awards for songwriting, and one for the most performed work in New Zealand. He received a Lifetime Achievement award in 2001 at the NZ Music Awards. As of 2013 he is the only musician to win the Silver Scroll award three times (1987, 1993, 1998).

Year	Award	Work
1987	Silver Scroll	"You Oughta Be in Love"
1993	Silver Scroll	"Belle of the Ball"
1995	Most Performed Work in New Zealand	"Language"
1998	Silver Scroll	"Beside You"
2001	Lifetime Achievement Award	

In 2001, a vote by members of APRA to find New Zealand's Top 100 songs (what would eventually become the Nature's Best series) included ten Dobbyn songs. These were:

- 3: Dave Dobbyn – "Loyal"
- 7: Dave Dobbyn with Herbs – "Slice of Heaven"
- 12: DD Smash – "Whaling"
- 27: Th' Dudes – "Be Mine Tonight"
- 29: Dave Dobbyn – "Beside You"
- 31: DD Smash – "Outlook For Thursday"
- 35: Dave Dobyyn – "Language"
- 50: Th' Dudes – "Bliss"
- 70: Dave Dobbyn – "You Oughta Be in Love"
- 100: Dave Dobbyn – "Naked Flame"

=== ARIA Music Awards ===
The ARIA Music Awards is an annual awards ceremony that recognises excellence, innovation, and achievement across all genres of Australian music. They commenced in 1987.

Year	Nominee / work	Award	Result	Ref.
1988	Dave Dobbyn	Best New Talent	Nominated	
1988	"Slice of Heaven"	Single of the Year	Nominated	
1988	"Slice of Heaven"	Song of the Year	Nominated	
1988	"Slice of Heaven"	Highest Selling Single	Nominated	

=== Lifetime Achievement Award ===
In 2001 the Recording Industry Association of New Zealand (RIANZ) awarded Dobbyn a rare Lifetime Achievement Award as part of the 2001 New Zealand Music Awards. The award presenter Michael Glading, the managing director of Sony New Zealand, chose to forego a speech and instead read out the titles of the long list of Dobbyn's hit songs.

== Personal life ==
Dobbyn met his future wife, Anneliesje, at a Whangamata Th' Dudes New Year's show. They married in 1983.

Dobbyn does not drink alcohol.

In October 2022, he revealed that he has Parkinson's disease. Dobbyn said that this diagnosis, received in July 2022, has given him a 'wider appreciation of life'.
