= Ian Morris (musician) =

New Zealand musician (1957–2010)

- Also known as: Tex Pistol
- Born: Ian Gordon Morris; 22 January 1957; England
- Died: 7 October 2010 (aged 53) Napier, New Zealand
- Genres: Pop, rock
- Occupations: musician, record producer, recording engineer, songwriter
- Instrument: Guitar
- Website: igmusic.co.nz

Ian Gordon Morris (22 January 1957 – 7 October 2010), also known by the stage name Tex Pistol, was a New Zealand musician, record producer, recording engineer and songwriter.

== Musical career ==
Ian Morris and his brother Richard (who would also go on to become a successful singer, songwriter and sound engineer in New Zealand under the name Rikki Morris) were born in England but emigrated with their family to New Zealand in 1966. They attended Sacred Heart College, Auckland.

Ian was a founding member of iconic New Zealand band Th' Dudes, formed at Sacred Heart in 1975. He had chart hits as a solo artist under the name Tex Pistol (a name he took on because "Ian Morris [didn't] sound poppy enough"), and in collaboration with his brother Rikki as Tex Pistol and Rikki Morris. As recording engineer and record producer, his production credits include a number of successful Kiwi artists: Hello Sailor, DD Smash, The Screaming Meemees, Naked Spots Dance, The Warratahs, When the Cat's Away, Greg Johnson, Dave Dobbyn, and Southside of Bombay to name a few. Morris also wrote numerous jingles, arrangements, and orchestrations.

== Personal life ==
Morris was married to singer Kim Willoughby of New Zealand's most successful all-female group When the Cat's Away, with whom he had two daughters, Julia and Maude, and a stepson, James. He was separated from his wife at the time of his death.

=== Death ===
Morris had been suffering from depression and died by suicide at Te Pania Hotel in Napier on 7 October 2010. Police noted that there were no suspicious circumstances to his death.

Morris was posthumously inducted into the New Zealand Music Hall of Fame.

== Discography ==
=== As solo artist ===
==== Albums ====
Year	Title	Details	Peak chart positions
Year	Title	Details	NZ
1988	Nobody Else	Released as Tex Pistol; Label: Pagan Records (PAL 1039)	28
2020	a and b the c of d	Released 2020; Label: IG Music (IGMLP001)	-

==== Singles ====
Year	Title	Peak chart positions	Album
Year	Title	NZ	Album
1983	"Boot Up (x=y)" as Jag Moritz	—	Non-album single
1986	"The Ballad of Buckskin Bob" as Tex Pistol	—	Nobody Else
1987	"Game of Love" as Tex Pistol	1	Nobody Else
1988	"Nobody Else" as Tex Pistol and Rikki Morris	1	Nobody Else
"—" denotes a recording that did not chart or was not released in that territory.

=== As producer ===
Selected discography
Band	Album/Single	Producer	Engineer
Th' Dudes	Right First Time		Yes
Hello Sailor	Hello Sailor		Yes
Hello Sailor	Pacifica Amour		Yes
Th' Dudes	Where Are The Boys?	Yes	Yes
DD Smash	Cool Bananas	Yes	
Screaming Meemees	If This Is Paradise I'll Take The Bag	Yes	
The Gurlz	The Gurlz mini-album	Yes	
Naked Spots Dance	New mini-album	Yes	Yes
The Hulamen	Start A Fashion mini-album	Yes	Yes
Jag Moritz	Boot Up	Yes	Yes
Circus Block 4	In Stone In Steel	Yes	Yes
Shadow Fax	Life Underground	Yes	Yes
Tex Pistol	"Game of Love"	Yes	Yes
Tex Pistol & Rikki Morris	"Nobody Else"	Yes	Yes
Rikki Morris	"Heartbroke Again"	Yes	Yes
The Warratahs	Big Sky	Yes	
The Warratahs	Wild Card	Yes	
Southside of Bombay	"What's The Time Mr Wolf?"	Yes	
Barry Saunders	Long Shadows	Yes	
Greg Johnson	Sea Breeze Motel	Yes	
Dave Dobbyn	Hopetown	Yes	
When The Cat's Away	Asian Paradise	Yes	Yes
Papa-Pa	My Black Jersey	Yes	Yes

== Awards ==
=== RIANZ ===
RIANZ New Zealand Music Awards
Year	Award	Details	Result
1978	Engineer of the Year	Hello Sailor, Hello Sailor	Won
1979	Single of the Year	'Be Mine Tonight', Th' Dudes	Won
1979	Top Group	Th' Dudes	Won
1982	Producer of the Year	Cool Bananas (DD Smash)	Won
1986	Most Promising Male Vocalist	"The Ballad of Buckskin Bob" as Tex Pistol	Won
1986	Best Engineer	Ballad of Buskin Bob, Tex Pistol	Nominated
1987	Engineer of the Year	"Game of Love", Tex Pistol	Won
1987	Best Producer	"Game of Love", Tex Pistol	Nominated
1988	Single of the Year	"Nobody Else", Tex Pistol / Rikki Morris	Nominated
1988	Best Producer	"Nobody Else", Tex Pistol / Rikki Morris	Nominated
1990	Producer of the Year	"Heartbroke", Rikki Morris	Won
1990	Best Engineer	Heartbroke, Rikki Morris	Nominated
2019	New Zealand Music Hall of Fame	himself (as part of Th' Dudes)	inductee

=== APRA ===
In 2001, members of APRA were invited to vote on their favourite New Zealand songs of all time. Of the final 100, 2 Morris-related songs appeared on the list.

- #27, for "Be Mine Tonight" with Th' Dudes (1978)
- #50, for "Bliss" with Th' Dudes (1979)

== See also ==
- Waikino music festival
- New Zealand music festivals
- Sweetwaters Music Festival
