= Golden Kiwis – The Hits Collection =

Golden Kiwis - The Hits Collection

Greatest hits album by Various Artists
- Released: 28 April 2005
- Length: 217:22
- Label: EMI
- Compiler: Bruce Ward

Golden Kiwis – The Hits Collection is a 3-disc New Zealand compilation album released in 2005, featuring hit songs from the 1960s to the 1980s. It was compiled by Bruce Ward and published by EMI.

== Track listing ==
=== Disc one: The Sixties ===
1. "I Have Loved Me a Man" - Allison Durbin
2. "Spinning Spinning Spinning" - The Simple Image
3. "Do the Bluebeat" - Dinah Lee
4. "Saint Paul" - Shane
5. "Miss You Baby" - The Chicks
6. "Thanks to You" - Mr Lee Grant
7. "Tumblin' Down" - Maria Dallas
8. "Theme from an Empty Coffee Lounge" - The Four Fours
9. "My Son John" - The Rebels
10. "Love, Hate, Revenge" - The Avengers
11. "Wait for Me Maryanne" - The Dedikation
12. "She's a Mod" - Ray Columbus & The Invaders
13. "How Is the Air up There" - La De Das
14. "Viva Bobbie Jo" - The Revival
15. "Daylight Saving Time" - Sandy Edmonds
16. "The White Rabbit" - Peter Posa
17. "Come with Me" - The Fourmyula
18. "Fortune Teller" - Ray Woolf
19. "Rain and Tears" - Hi Revving Tongues
20. "Sittin' in the Rain" - The Underdogs
21. "Gloria" - The Pleazers
22. "Let's Think of Something" - Larry's Rebels
23. "The Twist" - Herma Keil
24. "The Coming Generation" - The Gremlins
25. "Honey Do" - The Challenge
26. "Yes My Darlin'" - The Pleasers

=== Disc two: The Seventies ===
1. "When Jo Jo Runs" - Craig Scott
2. "Tequila Sunrise" - Annie Whittle
3. "Brandy" - Bunny Walters
4. "Good Morning Mr Rock and Roll" - Headband
5. "Out In The Street" - Space Waltz
6. "Dance All Around the World" - Blerta
7. "Coughtry High" - Ticket
8. "It Doesn't Matter Anymore" - Mark Williams
9. "Pretty Girl" - Hogsnort Rupert
10. "Join Together" - Steve Allen
11. "Make a Wish Amanda" - The In Betweens
12. "Miss September" - Bulldogs Allstar Goodtime Band
13. "Say a Prayer" - Chapta
14. "Today I Killed a Man I Didn't Know" - Nash Chase
15. "Only Time Could Let Us Know" - Link
16. "Carolina" - The Creation
17. "1905" - Shona Laing
18. "Lovely Lady" - John Hanlon
19. "L'Amour Est L'enfant De La Liberte" - The Rumour
20. "Sunshine Through a Prism" - Suzanne
21. "Looking Through the Eyes of a Beautiful Girl" - Kal Q Lated Risk
22. "Come to the Sabbat" - Timberjack
23. "Sweet Inspiration" - The Yandall Sisters
24. "Thru the Southern Moonlight" - Rockinghorse

=== Disc three: The Seventies and Eighties ===
1. "Slipping Away" - Max Merritt
2. "Make Love to You" - Tina Cross
3. "I Need Your Love" - Golden Harvest
4. "Words" - Sharon O'Neill
5. "April Sun In Cuba" - Dragon
6. "Walkin' in Light" - Th' Dudes
7. "Blue Lady" - Hello Sailor
8. "Tears" - The Crocodiles
9. "People" - Mi-Sex
10. "Love at First Night" - Kim Hart
11. "Montego Bay" - Jon Stevens
12. "Day Trip to Bangor" - Cathy & the Cucumbers
13. "Life Begins at Forty" - Dave & the Dynamos
14. "Shoop Shoop Diddy Wop" - Monte Video
15. "Forever Tuesday Morning" - The Mockers
16. "Heart and Soul" - The Narcs
17. "Room That Echoes" - Peking Man
18. "Sensation" - Fan Club
19. "Destiny in Motion" - Satellite Spies
20. "Melting Pot" - When The Cat's Away
