= List of number-one singles in New Zealand by New Zealand artists =

This is a list of number-one hits by New Zealand artists in New Zealand from the Official New Zealand Music Chart singles chart. (Note: Whether or not a song is of New Zealand origin is determined by Recorded Music New Zealand)

== List ==
Key
‡ – Number-one single of the year.
† – Number-one single of the year, of New Zealand origin.

Reached number one	Artist	Title	Weeks at number one
23 June 1967	Mr. Lee Grant	"Opportunity"	1
1 September 1967	Mr. Lee Grant	"Thanks To You"	3
29 March 1968	Mr. Lee Grant	"Why Or Where Or When"	2
19 July 1968	Simple Image	"Spinning, Spinning, Spinning"	2
27 September 1968	Allison Durbin	"I Have Loved Me a Man"	2
10 April 1969	Rebels	"My Son John"	2
24 April 1969	John Rowles	"M'Lady"	2
26 September 1969	Shane	"Saint Paul"	6
14 November 1969	Hi Revving Tongues	"Rain and Tears"	1
6 February 1970	The Fourmyula	"Nature"	4
8 May 1970	John Rowles	"Cheryl Moana Marie"	1
12 June 1970	Craig Scott	"Star Crossed Lovers"	4
7 August 1970	Hogsnort Rupert	"Pretty Girl"	3
28 August 1970	Maria Dallas	"Pinocchio"	6
22 October 1971	Rumour	"L'Amour est l'Enfante de la Liberte"	4
8 November 1974	Space Waltz	"Out on the Street"	2
17 January 1975	John Hanlon	"Lovely Lady"	3
Official New Zealand Music Chart (Recorded Music New Zealand)
27 June 1975	Mark Williams	"Yesterday Was Just the Beginning of My Life"	3
5 June 1977	Mark Williams	"It Doesn't Matter Anymore"	4
9 April 1978	John Rowles	"Tania"	4
2 December 1979	Jon Stevens	"Jezebel"	6
3 February 1980	Jon Stevens	"Montego Bay"	1
16 March 1980	Split Enz	"I Got You"	3
5 April 1981	Deane Waretini	"The Bridge"	2
12 April 1981	The Swingers	"Counting the Beat"	3
30 August 1981	Screaming Meemees	"See Me Go"	1
20 December 1981	Howard Morrison	"Whakaaria Mai (How Great Thou Art)"	5
18 July 1982	Prince Tui Teka	"E Ipo"	1
11 September 1983	Dave and the Dynamos	"Life Begins at Forty"	3
18 March 1984	Pātea Māori Club	"Poi E"	4
15 December 1985	Peking Man	"Room That Echoes"	2
15 June 1986	All Of Us	"Sailing Away"	9
5 October 1986	Dave Dobbyn featuring Herbs	"Slice of Heaven"	8
19 April 1987	Crowded House	"Don't Dream It's Over"	1
18 October 1987	Tex Pistol	"Game of Love"	1
17 July 1988	Holidaymakers	"Sweet Lovers"	6
9 October 1988	Tex Pistol and Rikki Morris	"Nobody Else"	1
11 December 1988	When the Cat's Away	"Melting Pot"	1
3 December 1989	Margaret Urlich	"Escaping"	3
11 February 1990	John Grenell	"Welcome to Our World"	3
28 October 1990	Ngaire	"To Sir With Love"	5
14 April 1991	Push Push	"Trippin'"	6
2 June 1991	The Parker Project	"Tears on My Pillow"	1
23 August 1992	Hammond Gamble	"You Make the Whole World Smile"	3 (2 runs)
27 February 1994	The Mutton Birds	"The Heater"	1
6 March 1994	3 The Hard Way	"Hip Hop Holiday"	3
22 May 1994	Supergroove	"Can't Get Enough"	1
11 December 1994	Headless Chickens	"George"	2
28 January 1996	OMC	"How Bizarre"	3
4 August 1996	DLT	"Chains"	5
5 July 1998	Fred Dagg	"We Don't Know How Lucky We Are"	1
9 August 1998	Deep Obsession	"Lost in Love"	2
4 October 1998	Che Fu	"Without a Doubt"/"Machine Talk"	1
14 February 1999	Ardijah	"Silly Love Songs"	1
16 May 1999	True Bliss	"Tonight"	2
11 July 1999	Deep Obsession	"Cold"	1
3 October 1999	Neil Finn	"Can You Hear Us"	1
21 November 1999	Deep Obsession	"One & Only"	2
24 December 2000	Fur Patrol	"Lydia"	1
12 May 2002	Goodshirt	"Sophie"	1
27 August 2003	Scribe	"Stand Up"/"Not Many"‡	12
19 October 2003	3 The Hard Way	"It's On (Move to This)"	1
22 February 2004	Scribe	"Dreaming"/"So Nice"	1
17 May 2004	Ben Lummis	"They Can't Take That Away"‡	7
26 July 2004	Misfits of Science	"Fools Love"	4
30 August 2004	Adeaze featuring Aaradhna	"Getting Stronger"	1
13 September 2004	Michael Murphy	"So Damn Beautiful"	1
20 September 2004	Dei Hamo	"We Gon' Ride"	5
25 October 2004	P-Money featuring Scribe	"Stop the Music"	3
24 January 2005	Savage	"Swing"	5
4 April 2005	Savage featuring Akon	"Moonshine"†	7
24 October 2005	Rosita Vai	"All I Ask"	2
9 October 2006	Boyband	"You Really Got Me"	1
6 November 2006	Matthew Saunoa	"Hold Out"	1
12 March 2007	Atlas	"Crawl"†	7
24 December 2007	The Underdogs	"A Very Silent Night"	1
7 July 2008	Tiki Taane	"Always On My Mind"†	2
4 August 2008	Nesian Mystik	"Nesian 101"	1
13 October 2008	P-Money featuring Vince Harder	"Everything"	3
23 February 2009	Smashproof featuring Gin Wigmore	"Brother"†	11
7 December 2009	Stan Walker	"Black Box"	10
15 March 2010	J. Williams featuring Scribe	"You Got Me"‡	4
14 June 2010	The Naked and Famous	"Young Blood"	2
18 October 2010	Brooke Fraser	"Something in the Water"	1
24 January 2011	Six60	"Rise Up 2.0"	1
14 March 2011	Avalanche City	"Love Love Love"	3
12 September 2011	Gotye featuring Kimbra	"Somebody That I Used to Know"†	6
3 September 2012	Flight of the Conchords	"Feel Inside (And Stuff Like That)"†	2
17 September 2012	Titanium	"Come On Home"	1
18 March 2013	Lorde	"Royals"†	3
17 June 2013	Lorde	"Tennis Court"	1
22 July 2013	Ginny Blackmore	"Bones"	1
29 July 2013	Jackie Thomas	"It's Worth It"	2
7 April 2014	Ginny Blackmore and Stan Walker	"Holding You"	1
10 November 2014	Six60	"Special"	1
17 November 2014	Timmy Trumpet & Savage	"Freaks"	5
13 July 2015	Avalanche City	"Inside Out"	1
13 March 2017	Lorde	"Green Light"	1
9 March 2020	L.A.B.	"In the Air" †	3
29 June 2020	Jawsh 685 and Jason Derulo	"Savage Love (Laxed – Siren Beat)"	6
14 December 2020	L.A.B.	"Why Oh Why"	5
8 March 2021	Six60	"All She Wrote"	1
2 May 2025	Lorde	"What Was That"	1

=== Notes ===
- Gotye was born in Belgium but raised in Australia. Kimbra is from New Zealand.
- Timmy Trumpet is Australian, Savage is from New Zealand.
- "Freaks" was Number one of New Zealand origin for 2014 and 2015.
- Neil Finn is from New Zealand, and the other band members are Australian
- "In The Air" was also number one of New Zealand origin in 2022 and 2023.
- "Why Oh Why" was number one of New Zealand origin in 2021.

== New Zealand artists with the most number-one hits ==
These totals includes singles when the artist is 'featured'—that is, not the main artist.

† – includes duet or collaboration by two New Zealand artists.
‡ – includes songs whose chart placings predate the Official New Zealand Music Chart which began in May 1975.

Artist	Number-one singles	Longest run	Total weeks at number one
Scribe	4	"Stand Up"/"Not Many" (12 weeks) †	20
Lorde	4	"Royals" (3 weeks)	6
John Rowles	3 ‡	"Tania" (4 weeks)	6
Mr. Lee Grant	3 ‡	"Thanks To You" (3 weeks)	6
Deep Obsession	3	"Lost in Love", "One & Only" (2 weeks each)	5
Savage	3	"Moonshine" (7 weeks)	17
Jon Stevens	2	"Jezebel" (5 weeks)	7
Mark Williams	2	"It Doesn't Matter Anymore" (4 weeks)	7
Tex Pistol	2	"Game of Love", "Nobody Else" (1 week each)	2
3 The Hard Way	2	"Hip Hop Holiday" (3 weeks)	4
P-Money	2	"Stop the Music", "Everything" (3 weeks each) †	6
Ginny Blackmore	2	"Bones", "Holding You" (1 week each) †	2
Stan Walker	2	"Black Box" (6 weeks) †	7
Avalanche City	2	"Love Love Love" (3 weeks)	4
L.A.B.	2	"Why oh Why" (5 weeks)	8

== Singles with most weeks at number one ==
‡ – includes songs whose chart placings predate the Official New Zealand Music Chart which began in May 1975.

Year	Artist	Song(s)	Total weeks at number one
2003	Scribe	"Stand Up"/"Not Many"	12
2009	Smashproof featuring Gin Wigmore	"Brother"	11
2009	Stan Walker	"Black Box"	10
1986	All Of Us	"Sailing Away"	9
1986	Dave Dobbyn featuring Herbs	"Slice of Heaven"	8
2020	Jawsh 685	"Savage Love (Laxed – Siren Beat)"	8
2004	Ben Lummis	"They Can't Take That Away"	7
2005	Savage featuring Akon	"Moonshine"	7
2007	Atlas	"Crawl"	7
1969	Shane	"Saint Paul"‡	6
1970	Maria Dallas	"Pinocchio"‡	6
1979	Jon Stevens	"Jezebel"	6
1988	Holidaymakers	"Sweet Lovers"	6
1991	Push Push	"Trippin'"	6
2011	Gotye featuring Kimbra	"Somebody That I Used to Know"	6
