= Aotearoa Music Award for Best Group =

Annual New Zealand music award

Best Group (Māori: Te Tino Kāhui Manu Taki o te Tau) is an Aotearoa Music Award that honours New Zealand groups that have released an outstanding album in the previous year. For the purposes of the award, a group consists of two or more people. The award winner is determined by the Voting Academy, along with a 30% sales performance weighting.

The award was first presented annually since 1970 as the Group Award as part of the Loxene Golden Disc awards, then as Recording Artist/Group of the Year as part of the Recording Arts Talent Awards. From 1978, the award has been presented as part of the New Zealand Music Awards, first named Top Group, then Best Group. Shihad has won the award twice and been nominated eight other times, The Chills have also won twice and been nominated one other time, while DD Smash and The Naked and Famous have each won twice.

== Recipients ==
=== Loxene Golden Disc: Group Award (1970 to 1972) ===
Year	Winner	Album	Ref.
1970	Hogsnort Rupert	"Pretty Girl"	
1971	Chapta	"Say a Prayer"	
1972	Creation	"Carolina"	

=== Recording Arts Talent Awards: Recording Artist/Group of the Year (1973 to 1977) ===
Year	Winner	Ref.
1973	Shona Laing	
1974	Bulldogs Allstar Goodtime Band	
1975	Mark Williams	
1976	Dr Tree	
1977	No awards held	

=== New Zealand Music Awards: Top Group (1978 to 1984) ===
Year	Winner	Other finalists	Ref.
1978	Hello Sailor	—	
1979	Th' Dudes	—	
1980	The Crocodiles	—	
1981	Dave McArtney & The Pink Flamingos	Newmatics; Coup D'État	
1982	DD Smash	Herbs; The Narcs	
1983	DD Smash	Herbs; The Narcs	
1984	Dance Exponents	The Mockers; Pātea Māori Club and Dalvanius Prime	

=== New Zealand Music Awards: Best Group (1985 to 2016) ===
Year	Winner	Album	Other finalists	Ref.
1985	Netherworld Dancing Toys	—	The Mockers; Peking Man	
1986	Peking Man	—	Pātea Māori Club; Satellite Spies	
1987	The Chills	—	Ardijah; Herbs	
1988	Herbs	—	The Chills; The Warratahs	
1989	When the Cat's Away	—	The Warratahs; Fan Club	
1990	The Chills	—	Straitjacket Fits; Fan Club	
1991	No awards held			
1992	Push Push	—	The Exponents; Headless Chickens	
1993	The Mutton Birds	—	Greg Johnson Set; The Exponents	
1994	Headless Chickens	—	Strawpeople; Straitjacket Fits	
1995	Supergroove	—	The Mutton Birds; Headless Chickens	
1996	Shihad	—	The Exponents; The Mutton Birds; Finn Brothers	
1997	Garageland	—	Shihad; The Mutton Birds	
1998	Shihad	—	The Mutton Birds; Dam Native	
1999	The Feelers	—	Ardijah; Shihad	
2000	Stellar	Mix	Shihad – The General Electric; Deep Obsession – Infinity	
2001	Zed	Silencer	Tadpole – The Buddhafinger; Shihad – Pacifier	
2002	Salmonella Dub	Inside the Dub Plates	The Feelers – Communicate; Zed – Silencer	
2003	The Datsuns	The Datsuns	Goodshirt – "Sophie"; Nesian Mystik – Polysaturated	
2004	Dimmer	You've Got to Hear the Music	Elemeno P – Love & Disrespect; Goodshirt – Fiji Baby	
2005	Fat Freddy's Drop	Based on a True Story	Goldenhorse – Out of the Moon; Shihad – Love Is the New Hate	
2006	Elemeno P	Trouble In Paradise	Bleeders –As Sweet as Sin; Fly My Pretties – The Return of... Fly My Pretties	
2007	The Mint Chicks	Crazy? Yes! Dumb? No!	Evermore – Real Life; Opshop – Second Hand Planet	
2008	Flight of the Conchords	Flight of the Conchords	Shihad – Beautiful Machine; The Phoenix Foundation – Happy Ending	
2009	Midnight Youth	The Brave Don't Run	Fat Freddy's Drop – Dr Boondigga and the Big BW; The Mint Chicks – Screens (Mint Chicks album)	
2010	The Phoenix Foundation	Buffalo	Shapeshifter – The System Is a Vampire; The Checks – Alice by the Moon	
2011	The Naked and Famous	Passive Me, Aggressive You	Shihad – Ignite; Kids of 88 – Sugarpills	
2012	Six60	Six60	Home Brew – Home Brew; Opossum – Electric Hawaii	
2013	Shapeshifter	Delta	Fat Freddy's Drop – Blackbird; The Phoenix Foundation – Fandango	
2014	The Naked and Famous	In Rolling Waves	Sol3 Mio – Sol3 Mio; @Peace – @Peace and the Plutonian Noise Symphony	
2015	Broods	Evergreen	Shihad – FVEY; Six60 – Six60	
2016	Broods	Conscious	Fat Freddy's Drop – Bays; Sole Mio – On Another Note; The Phoenix Foundation – Give Up Your Dreams	
2017	SWIDT	Stoneyhunga	Devilskin – Be Like The River; Leisure – Leisure; Shapeshifter – Stars	
2018	Six60	Six60 EP	Alien Weaponry - Tū; Drax Project – Noon; Unknown Mortal Orchestra – Sex & Food	
2019	The Beths	Future Me Hates Me	Beatwars – IV; Broods – Don't Feed the Pop Monster; L.A.B. – L.A.B II	
2020	The Beths	Jump Rope Gazers	L.A.B. – L.A.B III; Miss June – Bad Luck Party; Six60 – Six60	
2021	L.A.B.	L.A.B. IV	Crowded House – Dreamers Are Waiting; The Phoenix Foundation – Friend Ship; Shapeshifter – Rituals	
2022	L.A.B.	L.A.B. V	Alien Weaponry – Tangaroa; Fat Freddy's Drop – WAIRUNGA; Ka Hao – Ka Hao: One Tira / One Voice	
2023	No awards held			
2024	The Beths	Expert in a Dying Field	Home Brew; Leisure; Mermaidens; Tiny Ruins; Unknown Mortal Orchestra	
2025	Earth Tongue	Great Haunting	Corrella – Skeletons; DARTZ – Dangerous Day to be a Cold One; Foley; L.A.B – L.A.B IV; SKILAA – Tiger in the River	
