= Loxene Golden Disc =

Annual New Zealand music award

The Loxene Golden Disc was an annual New Zealand music award which ran from 1965 to 1972. It was superseded by the Recording Arts Talent Awards (RATA).

== Background ==
The awards launched in 1965 and is the forerunner of the New Zealand Music Awards. It was created by the advertising agency of British multi-national company Reckitt & Colman, with support from the New Zealand Broadcasting Corporation (NZBC), the New Zealand Federation of Phonographic Industries and the Australasian Performing Right Association (APRA), with the awards named after Reckitt & Colman's anti-dandruff shampoo, Loxene.

10 finalist songs (later 12) were selected annually by a panel, with the winner decided by a public vote. While initially only one prize was given, other awards were added, including categories for record cover, recording artist of the year, and a producer award. From 1969, two awards were given - one to a solo artist, the other to a group however there was still one supreme award.

In 1965 and 1966 compilation LPs with tracks by annual finalists were released by Viking Records, with the 1970, 1971 and 1972 LPs released by HMV on behalf of the industry.

== Broadcasts ==
The television broadcast of the 1972 show won the 1973 Feltex Award for Best Light Entertainment.

== Last awards ==
The final Loxene Golden Disc awards were presented in 1972. In 1973 the New Zealand Federation of Phonographic Industry (later named the Recording Industry Association of New Zealand) created its own awards, the Recording Arts Talent Awards (RATA).

== 1965 ==
The first Golden Discs ceremony was broadcast on radio, live from the White Heron Lodge in Wellington on 25 November 1965. An earlier television programme featured the 10 finalists performing their songs live in studio.

- Ray Columbus and the Invaders – "Till We Kissed"
  - Dinah Lee – "I’ll Forgive You Then Forget You"
  - Herma Keil – "Teardrops"
  - The Yeomen – "Love Is A Very Funny Thing"
  - Tony and the Initials – "Leah"
  - The Chicks – "Hucklebuck"
  - Tommy Adderley – "Like Dreamers Do'
  - Paul Walden – "No Moa!"
  - Bruno Lawrence – "Bruno Do That Thing"
  - The Minors – "You’re Not There"

== 1966 ==
The 1966 award was again held at the White Heron Lodge in Wellington, on 9 November 1966. The event was broadcast live on radio. The night before, the finalist performed on an hour-long television special.

- Maria Dallas – "Tumblin’ Down"
  - Jay Epae – "Hold On Tight"
  - Howard Morrison – "Don’t Let It Get You"
  - Ray Columbus – "I Need You"
  - The Gremlins – "The Coming Generation"
  - The La De Da's – "How is the Air Up There"
  - The Yeomen – "Love is a Very Funny Thing"
  - John Hore – "My Heart Skipped A Beat"
  - Gwyne Owen – "In My Room"
  - Ken Lemon – "Living In A House Full Of Love"

== 1967 ==
The awards were held for the final time at the White Heron Lodge on 4 November 1967. A television programme previewing the 10 finalists screened two days before the ceremony. Instead of the studio performances of previous years, the show used video clips of the artists performing their songs.

- Mr. Lee Grant – "Thanks to You"
  - Herma Keil – "C’mon"
  - The Gremlins – "Blast Off 1970"
  - The La De Da's – 'Rosalie'
  - Sandy Edmonds – "Daylight Saving Time"
  - Larry’s Rebels – "Let’s Think of Something"
  - The Avengers – 'Everyone’s Gonna Wonder"
  - The Underdogs – "Sittin’ in the Rain"
  - Maria Dallas – "Handy Man"
  - Ray Woolf and The Avengers – "Crystal Ball"

== 1968 ==
In 1968 the awards ceremony moved to Auckland, with the Golden Disc presented at the Intercontinental Hot on 7 November 1968. The awards also included a Cover of The Year award, but there is no record of who won this. The award were broadcast live on television and simulcast on NZBC radio stations.

- Allison Durbin – "I Have Loved Me a Man"
  - The Shevelles – "Beat the Clock"
  - Larry’s Rebels – "Halloween"
  - Ray Columbus – "Happy in a Sad Kind of Way"
  - The Hi-Revving Tongues – "Tropic of Capricorn"
  - The Avengers – 'Love Hate Revenge"
  - The Simple Image – "Spinning Spinning Spinning"
  - The Fourmyula – "Alice is There"
  - The Chicks – "River Deep-Mountain High"
  - Mr. Lee Grant – "Why or Where or When"

== 1969 ==
The awards were again held at the Intercontinental Hotel in Auckland, on 15 October 1969. Three news awards were introduction - secondary awards for the best group and best solo artist, as well as an award for the best producer.

- Golden Disc Award: The Hi-Revving Tongues – "Rain and Tears"
- Solo Award: Shane – "Saint Paul"
- Group Award: "The Hi-Revving Tongues – "Rain and Tears"
- Producer Award: Wayne Senior

=== Top 10 finalists ===
- The Hi-Revving Tongues – "Rain and Tears"
- Shane – "Saint Paul"
- Larry Morris – "The Hunt"
- The Rebels – "My Son John"
- Dedikation – "Wait For Me Mary-Anne"
- Mike Durney – "Why Can’t I Cry'
- The Avengers – "Out Of Sight Out Of Mind"
- The Chicks – 'Miss You Baby"
- Hamilton County Bluegrass Band – "Barefoot Nellie"
- The Simple Image – "Michael and the Slipper Tree"

== Winners ==
Year	Artist	Song	Award
1965	Ray Columbus & the Invaders	"Till We Kissed"	Golden Disc
1966	Maria Dallas	"Tumblin' Down"	Golden Disc
1967	Mr Lee Grant	"Thanks to You"	Golden Disc
1968	Allison Durbin	"I Have Loved me a Man"	Golden Disc
1969	Shane	"Saint Paul"	Golden Disc
1970	Craig Scott	"Let's Get a Little Sentimental"	Solo
1970	Hogsnort Rupert	"Pretty Girl"	Group and Golden Disc
1971	Craig Scott	"Smiley"	Solo and Golden Disc
1971	Chapta	"Say a Prayer"	Group
1972	Suzanne	"Sunshine Through a Prism"	Solo
1972	Creation	"Carolina"	Group and Golden Disc
