= Glyn Tucker =

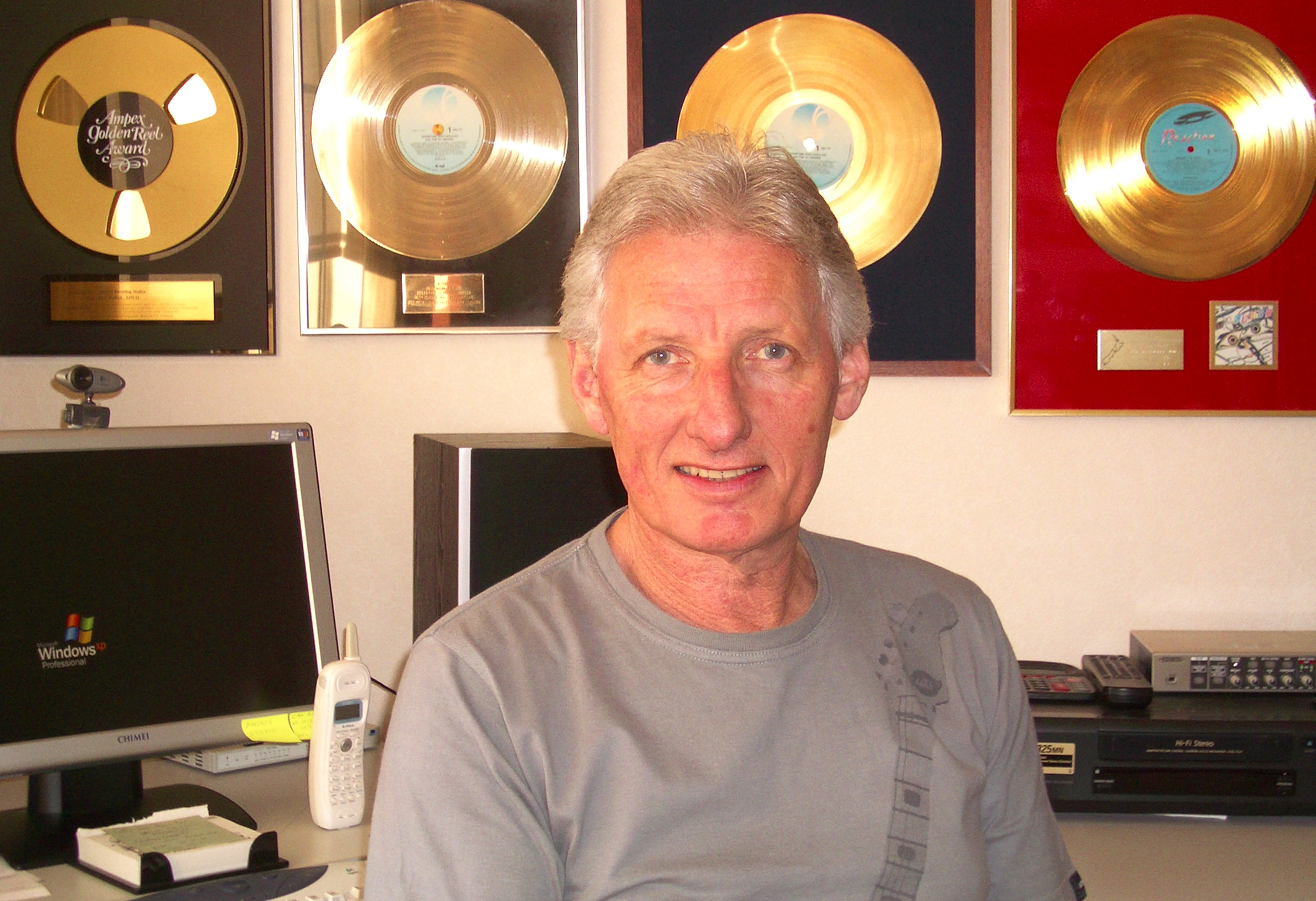

Background information
- Born: c. 1943; Wellington, New Zealand
- Genres: Rock and roll; pop
- Occupations: Singer-songwriter, musician, producer
- Formerly of: The Gremlins

Glyn Tucker (born c. 1943) is a New Zealand musician and music producer. Following an early career as a singer/songwriter in The Gremlins (1965–1968), he founded Mandrill Recording Studios in Auckland in 1975, and produced and engineered hundreds of New Zealand songs in the late seventies, eighties, and early nineties.

== Early life and education ==
Glyn Tucker spent his early years in Miramar, Wellington, New Zealand, moving to Upper Hutt at the age of 11 in 1954. he was named after his father's brother Glyn, who was embarking that same day with the New Zealand armed forces to fight in the Italian campaign against Mussolini and Hitler. The family would call them Big Glyn and Little Glyn. Later in life the elder Glyn would achieve celebrity status as a New Zealand television personality, so Little Glyn became known as Glyn Tucker during the 1970-80s. He was to become an important and respected pioneer of the New Zealand recording community.

Having learned some elementary piano and violin as a child, Tucker threw that all away when, as a young teenager he was "floored" by the sound of rock 'n' roll. He was inspired by Buddy Holly to be a singer/songwriter.

== Career ==
By 1960, aged 17, Tucker recorded a version of Chuck Berry's "Carol" at Auckland's Stebbings Recording Studio for the Zodiac Label. It had one of his first compositions on the flipside. He then joined new band The Embers and worked at the popular teen club The Shirallee. Bandmates were Gary Daverne, Mike Kelly, Keith Graham and Johnny Willets.

After a four-year stint as compere/singer at a suburban dance-hall Tucker put together a band to reflect the new beat sound coming out of Britain. During this period he adopted a stage name of Glyn Conway which he kept with his new band The Gremlins. They had a hit with their first record released on Gary Daverne's Viscount label in 1966; “The Coming Generation” made it to #2 on the NZ Top 20 (the #1 was Yellow Submarine by The Beatles).

The Gremlins were voted as a finalist in the Loxene Gold Disc Awards with that recording in 1966 and again in 1967 with Tucker's composition, “Blast Off 1970”. They toured New Zealand on the “Loxene Gold Disc Spectacular” with other finalists, Mr Lee Grant, Larry's Rebels, Ray Woolf, Sandy Edmonds, The Avengers and Herma Keil. The show played concerts to packed houses in cinemas and theatres all over New Zealand.

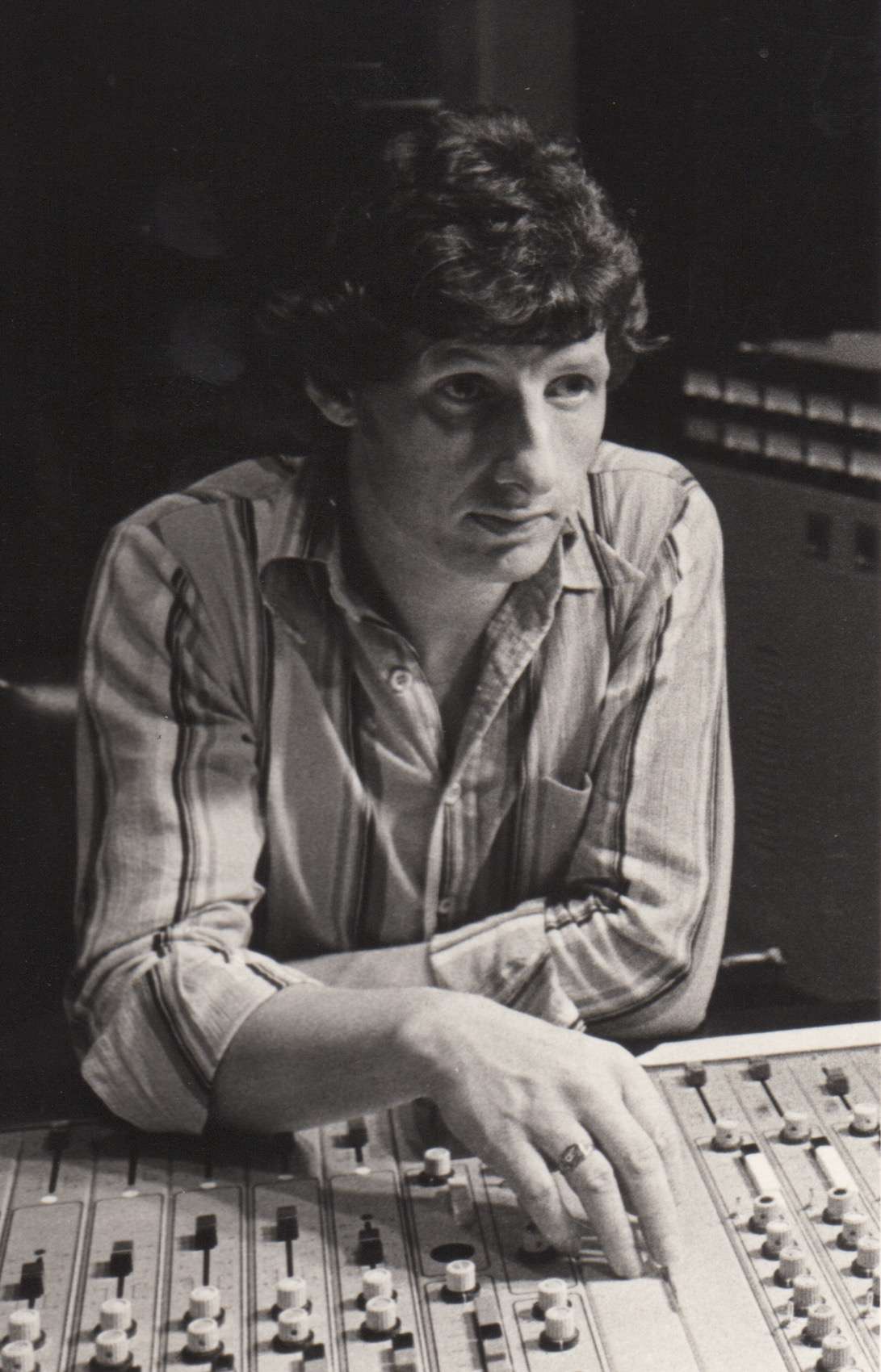
Tucker behind the recording console at Mandrill Recording Studios, 1977

In 1975 Tucker founded Mandrill Recording Studios with colleague Dave Hurley. Starting as a low-budget facility in which to record demos for local bands (and for himself) Mandrill flourished and became big supporter of local talent, recording hundreds of albums and singles over the following 20 years. Mandrill began with a simple 4-track Teac recorder and by the early eighties had upgraded to 24 track MCI and Otari machines with Trident mixing consoles. Tucker became a major influence on the New Zealand music scene encouraging and developing scores of bands and singers, producing many hits on his labels Mandrill and later Reaction. Some of the acts he signed and/or produced were, Alistair Riddell, Citizen Band, Rick Steele, Midge Marsden Connection, Human Instinct, The Crocodiles, The Mockers, Danse Macabre, Car Crash Set, Paul Agar, Marginal Era, Blond Comedy, National Anthem, Gotham City Express, Knightshade, Wayne Roland Brown, Everything That Flies, Mark Loveys Satellite Spies, David Hasselhoff, Billy T James, The Hi Marks, Suzanne Prentice, Howard Morrison and others.

January 1979, Mandrill Studios had a visit from the legendary American record producer Kim Fowley. Tucker introduced him to Street Talk, one of Auckland's premier blues-rock bands and that began a series of recordings with Street Talk and later with Tucker producing The Crocodiles. It was the beginning of a long-term relationship; trading music ideas and talent with Kim and then Peer-Southern Music Publishing in Los Angeles.

Tucker also set up Mandrill Music Publishing to administer many of the above listed recordings. He and Mandrill Music were major contributors the recording of the music for the 1990 Commonwealth Games commemorative CD including the main theme song “This is The Moment”, and the performance of "Tukua Ahau" by Sir Howard Morrison.

Tucker eventually bought out his partners in Mandrill Recording Studios Ltd, who had done their share towards its ultimate success. But it was Tucker who had everything on the line and had the drive to ensure survival. Dave Hurley, Gary Daverne, Mike Emerson, and Bruce Lynch were these contributors. The studio was sold in 1995, ending an era.

During his 21 years operating Mandrill Recording Studios, Tucker wrote and produced hundreds of jingles for advertisers, mainly for TV and radio. Many of these were in partnership with singer-songwriter Steve Allen. He was awarded the Axis Award from the Advertising Institute of NZ in 1987 for craft excellence, and in 1992 he received the International Mobius Award on behalf of Mandrill Studios for their work on a radio commercial for Castle Parcels.

Tucker became a member of APRA in 1960 when his first song was recorded, on the flipside of "Carol", and in 1980 he became a Writer Full Member.

He became actively involved with the NZ recording industry, sitting on the board of the NZ Composers Foundation from 1985 to 1995. The foundation was funded by APRA to assist new musical talent in all genres, and Tucker was a strong lobbyist in supporting music producers and musicians to travel and attend MIDEM music trade festival in Cannes. This became an annual grant. The members of the board were:

- Ashley Heenan (chairman)
- Professor John Ritchie - Christchurch University
- Professor John Rimmer - Auckland University
- Professor David Farquhar - Wellington University
- Tony Baker - Musical Director, Light Entertainment, TVNZ
- Glyn Tucker - record producer/publisher, Mandrill Studios

Tucker also sat on the NZ Music Promotions Committee (NZMPC), which was set up by RIANZ and representatives of independent and government broadcasters, to encourage more airplay for Kiwi recordings. He had regrets later that this initiative seemed to have been set up with a political agenda, to divert the Government from following Australia's lead in setting minimum quotas for NZ recordings on radio. Since the NZMPC's own monthly surveys in the mid-eighties averaged a mere 2-3% local content, it seemed to Tucker that Australia had got it right (and New Zealand had it horribly wrong).

Tucker retreated from the music industry for a few years to work on other business, but continued to administer the publishing catalogue. He has spent several years re-mastering his collection of recordings from the analogue tapes into a digital format and getting them online for posterity.

In 2002 he returned to set up a one-off project with Eddie Rayner (Split Enz) to record a CD entitled, Play it Straight by the Eddie Rayner Project. This featured a collection of Kiwi singers performing a variety of Kiwi-written songs.

Tucker is still writing and recording songs from his home in Northland, New Zealand. Guitar legend Gray Bartlett recorded one of his instrumental compositions, "The Sad Princess", released in April 2016.

== Special projects ==
=== Satellite Spies - Destiny In Motion ===
Satellite Spies was an Auckland rock band formed in December 1984 as a vehicle for the songs of singer/bassist Mark Loveys. Their early life was as Loveys' former band, Blasé, that Glyn Tucker began mentoring and developing in 1983 after Loveys booked Mandrill Studios to record some song demos. Tucker was impressed and in 1984 released two Blasé singles on his Reaction label : “Rock Solid” and “Just Like the Old Days”. He continued to record several demos tracks of Lovey's new songs throughout 1984 (one of which was “Destiny in Motion”), but Blasé was eventually judged to be a weak name, and so a name change was agreed. Deane Sutherland (aka Tommy Joy) was invited to join Loveys and so Satellite Spies was born and signed a recording agreement as a duo with Tucker's Reaction Records on 1 January 1985.

They recorded the album “Destiny in Motion” at Mandrill Studios in 1985. The title track, produced by Tim Palmer (UK) became a hit single in NZ and led to the band touring NZ with Dire Straits Brothers in Arms tour the following year; playing to a total audience of around 140,000.

Satellite Spies' recorded works, won the official RIANZ Music Award for Most Promising Group of the Year, 1985 and Mark Loveys took the award for Most Promising Male Vocal.

After the Dire Straits tour Loveys and Sutherland split, and Loveys continued to record and fulfill his contract with Reaction Records. He put together a new band with Tucker's approval that included Gordon Joll (drums) Eddie Pausma (guitar) and David Curtiss (keyboards). Satellite Spies with this line-up toured NZ venues 1986-1988 and recorded and released several singles, “Living in a Minefield”, “Private Detective”, “Only Here for the Rock 'n' Roll”, and “Gonna Have to Change”, all produced by Tucker. Reaction also produced accompanying music videos.

Satellite Spies disbanded in 1988. Two years later Deane Sutherland formed a new band by the same name with no other relation. Reaction, who had signed the band in 1985 was unaware that in May 1987 Sutherland had trademarked the name “Satellite Spies” in NZ. The new band began touring NZ and Australia and Tucker made the decision not to dispute the trademark as it was uneconomic to do so.

Sutherland's version of Satellite Spies had a Top 20 single with “It Must Be Love” and this version of the band continued to play live for more than two decades despite disputes between Loveys and Sutherland over naming rights.

== Recording industry positions ==
- Chairperson, IMPPA 1987-1990 (Independent Music Producers and Performers Association)
- Director, NZ Composers Foundation 1985-1995
- Writer Full Member of APRA (Australasian Performing Right Association) since 1980
- Member of RIANZ (Recording Industry Association of NZ, now Recorded Music NZ)

== Awards ==
- Fullers Award from the Variety Artists Club of New Zealand, October 2018

=== The Gremlins awards ===
- Nominated Loxene Gold Disc Award 1966; The Gremlins, The Coming Generation
- Nominated Loxene Gold Disc Award 1967; The Gremlins, Blast Off 1970

=== Production awards ===
- Nominated Producer of the Year, NZ Music Awards 1984; The Mockers, Swear it's True, album
- Nominated Engineer of the Year, NZ Music Awards 1984: You Fascinate, Marginal Era, single
- Nominated Producer of the Year, NZ Music Awards 1985; The Mockers, Forever Tuesday Morning
- Nominated Producer of the Year, NZ Music Awards 1986; I Wish I'd Asked, Satellite Spies
- Axis Award, to Tucker for craft excellence 1987
- Mobius Award, to Mandrill, top radio commercial 1992
- Twenty-two Gold albums to Tucker and/or Mandrill
- Three Platinum albums to Tucker and/or Mandrill

=== New Zealand Music Awards by Tucker-produced artists ===
- Winner Most Promising Group 1978; Citizen Band
- Winner Top Group 1980; The Crocodiles
- Nominated Album of the Year 1984; The Mockers, Swear It's True.
- Nominated Top Male Vocalist 1984; Andrew Fagan (Mockers)
- Nominated Top Group 1984; The Mockers
- Nominated Best Group 1985; The Mockers
- Nominated Single of the Year 1985: Forever Tuesday Morning, The Mockers
- Winner Most Promising Group 1985; Satellite Spies, Destiny in Motion
- Nominated Most Promising Group 1985, Everything That Flies
- Winner Most Promising Male Vocal 1985: Mark Loveys (Satellite Spies)
- Nominated Most Promising Female Vocal 1985: Dianne Swann (Everything That Flies)
- Nominated Best Country Album 1985; Suzanne Prentice, I Wish I Was Waltzing With You.
- Nominated Best Male Vocal 1986: Mark Loveys (Satellite Spies)
- Nominated Best Group 1986; Satellite Spies
- Winner Best Video 1986; As The Sun Goes Down, Everything That Flies
- Nominated Most Promising Male Vocal 1987; Wayne Elliot (Knightshade)
- Nominated Most Promising Group 1987; Knightshade
