= Ken Lemon =

New Zealand country singer

- Born: Kenneth Arthur Lemon; 1939 (age 86–87); Barrow-in-Furness, England
- Genres: Country
- Occupation: Singer
- Years active: 1963–1986
- Labels: Viking Records; Festival Records; Zodiac Records

Kenneth Arthur Lemon (born 1939) was a New Zealand country musician who was active from the 1960s to the 1980s. His single "Living in a House Full of Love" was a finalist for the 1966 Loxene Golden Disc. He toured and released an album with Maria Dallas in 1967. In the early 1970s, Lemon was a regular performer on the television country music variety show The Country Touch, hosted by Tex Morton.

== Early life ==
Lemon was born in Barrow-in-Furness, England, in 1939, and was apprenticed as a marine coppersmith. During the 1950s and early 1960s, he occasionally took part in talent quests and sang socially in local dance halls and pubs. He migrated to New Zealand around 1962, with his parents and brother, settling in Auckland, after his sister and brother-in-law had earlier made the move. He found work, initially as a coppersmith at the Devonport Naval Base, and then as a sheetmetal engineering worker.

== Singing career ==
A few months after arriving in New Zealand, Lemon took part in a singing contest at the Shiralee nightclub in downtown Auckland. He won his heat and, although he did not win the final, was engaged to be the club's resident singer, performing from Friday to Sunday. He also got a deal with Octagon Records, and recorded with debut single, "Detroit City", backed by Rudy & The Crystals, at Stebbing Studios. That was followed by two singles arranged and directed by Peter Posa, and released jointly by Octagon and Viking Records: a cover of "China Doll" by Slim Whitman and "Sailor Man".

Viking Records director Ron Dalton wanted to make best use of Lemon's rich baritone voice. He teamed Lemon up with Mike Perjanik at Stebbings Studio, and they recorded Lemon's debut LP, This Hombre Called Lemon, released in December 1965. The album included covers of Don Gibson's "Oh Lonesome Me" and "King of the Road" by Roger Miller, and would later be released in the United States in 1967 on the Roulette label.

Lemon's second album, titled The Second Album, recorded at the His Master's Voice studios in Wellington, was released in 1966. It featured the song "Living in a House Full of Love", which was a finalist for that year's Loxene Golden Disc, as well as seven songs by Lee Hazlewood, including "These Boots Are Made for Walkin'" and "Houston".

From 1966, Lemon took part in three Miss New Zealand tours organised by Dunedin impresario Joe Brown.

In 1967, Lemon toured New Zealand with Maria Dallas in The Maria Dallas Country Show, and a live LP of the same name was released. After a performance at the Civic Theatre in Christchurch on 4 February, a critic from The Press newspaper wrote:

Ken Lemon appeared—luridly dressed—to sing, unashamedly in the style of the late Jim Reeves. He has a pleasant voice, although one suspects him of positioning it in places into which it has no inclination to go."

Also in 1967, Lemon and Dallas released the album Face to Face, although they did not sing any songs together.

Lemon made his debut on the television country music variety show, The Country Touch, hosted by Tex Morton, on 16 September 1970, and became a regular performer on the show. He continued to tour New Zealand, performing with Joe Brown's 1970 Big Country and Western Stage Show in late 1970, with other acts including Hogsnort Rupert, Eddie Low, the Hamilton County Bluegrass Band and Gray Bartlett. A critic from The Press opined after a show at the Theatre Royal in Christchurch on 28 November, that Lemon, "with his easy but rich style", was one of the stars of the show.

In 1972, Lemon's third album, A Slice of Lemon, was produced and arranged by Barry Clewett, and released by Zodiac Records. The following year, Lemon toured the country with Joe Brown's 9th Annual Country and Western Stage Show. He sang several country and western songs, including "Walk Tall", with the reviewer from The Press, after the 8 September show at Christchurch's Theatre Royal, saying that Lemon's "pleasant baritone voice is ideally suited to C and W music".

Also in 1973, Lemon appeared on the television song contest Studio One, singing Glyn Tucker's song "Hard Lines, Son". After that, Lemon performed only occasionally, but made a return to recording in 1986, when he recorded a single, "Roll On Waikato", written by Harry McRae, produced by Gray Bartlett, and released on the Festival label.

 Ken passed away on the 8th of May 2026 in Auckland, aged 87. 

== Discography ==
- This Hombre Called Lemon (1965, Viking)
- The Second Album (1966, Viking)
- Face To Face – Maria Dallas & Ken Lemon (1967, Viking)
- A Slice Of Lemon (1972, Zodiac)
