= Redwood 70 =

1970 music festival in Swanson, New Zealand

- Genre: Folk, pop, rock, bluegrass, gospel
- Dates: 31 January – 1 February 1970
- Locations: Redwood Park, Swanson, West Auckland, New Zealand
- Coordinates: 36.863°S 174.576°E
- Years active: 1970; 56 years ago
- Founders: Phil Warren
- Attendance: 9,000–10,000 (estimated)

The Redwood 70 National Music Convention, commonly referred to as Redwood 70, was a music festival held on Auckland Anniversary Weekend in Swanson, West Auckland, New Zealand in 1970. Held six months after the Woodstock festival in the United States, Redwood 70 was the first modern multi-day pop music festival held in New Zealand. Headlined by Robin Gibb of the BeeGees with a line-up of predominantly New Zealand musicians, Gibb and his backing orchestra were pelted by objects from the crowd. While the concert did not turn a profit, it popularised the modern multi-day music festival in New Zealand.

== Festival ==
The event was organised by local music promoter Phil Warren. Local media hyped the festival as the New Zealand version of Woodstock, which had been held six months earlier. While billed as New Zealand's first national music convention, Redwood 70 was an expansion of the multi-performer package tours of provincial centres, which had become popular in the mid-1960s. Two weeks before the festival, the owners of the venue, Redwood Park, attempted to cancel the event, concerned about the event's scale, and in mid-January Warren's office was broken into, with thieves exploding a safe and taking $850 in cash from Warren. In mid-January, Warren was still pursuing major acts to attend the concert, including John Lennon and Yoko Ono, Eric Clapton, José Feliciano and Klaus Voormann, none of whom agreed to attend the festival.

The concert was held over two days in Redwood Park, Swanson, West Auckland, New Zealand, during the Auckland Anniversary Weekend. Robin Gibb of the BeeGees was billed as the headline act, performing during his brief solo career away from the band. The remaining line-up were New Zealand musicians, featuring a mix of pop acts and already popular musicians such as The Chicks, Ray Columbus and The Hi-Revving Tongues, jazz, country folk and gospel acts, and rock musicians from the Auckland, Wellington and Hamilton club scenes.

An estimated 9,000 to 10,000 people attended the festival, with 1,500 people staying overnight at the Redwood Park campground. Gibb's performance on the first night was mired by an unruly crowd, who threw cans, bottles and tomatoes at Gibb and his 17-piece orchestra. Many people attempted to climb onto the stage, including one woman who embraced Gibb. As Gibb continued to perform, most his backing band gradually left, concerned for their safety and the safety of their instruments, and the set was finished early.

Day two of the event featured a much stronger security presence, and due to advice from the police ended three hours early. The festival was the final performances of two acts in the line-up, Disraeli Gears and The Hi-Revving Tongues.

== Response and aftermath ==
Concert promoter Phil Warren did not make back the $25,000 in costs, however the festival left a lasting cultural impression on New Zealand, and became the first modern music festival in the country. Due to the financial loss of Redwood 70, festivals were held on a much smaller scale in the summer of 1970/1971, and no major festivals were held in 1972. The next large-scale festival to take place in the country was The Great Ngaruawahia Music Festival in 1973.

During the festival, the mainstream media mostly ignored the local acts who performed at the concert, instead focusing on Gibb.

A half-hour documentary on the concert was aired by the New Zealand Broadcasting Corporation on 2 April 1970.

== Performing artists ==
- The Arch
- Armageddon
- But We'd
- Byble
- Challenge
- The Chicks
- Cincinnati Underground
- Cinderella
- Classic Affair
- Ray Columbus
- Sonny Day
- Dedikation
- Disraeli Gears
- Dizzy Limits
- Fresh Air
- The Game
- Robin Gibb
- Hamilton County Bluegrass Band
- The Hi-Revving Tongues
- Tony Hopkins Gospel Groups
- House of Nimrod
- Killing Floor
- Label
- Mad Dog Jug Band
- Maine Street
- Jacob Manning Group
- Mary Anne
- The Ministry of Fog
- Mixed Bag
- Molly
- Larry Morris
- The Movement
- Omnibus
- Lynne Pike
- Revival
- Dick Roberts
- The Rumour
- Shane
- Roger Skinner & the Motivation
- T'Bird Impressions
- Tom Thumb
