= Sailing Away (All of Us song) =

Single by All Of Us
- B-side: "Pick It Up"
- Released: 1986
- Recorded: Auckland, 1986
- Genre: Pop
- Length: 3:59
- Label: CBS
- Songwriters: Lyrics: Len Potts, Charlie Sutherland and Paul Katene; Music: Traditional
- Producer: Murray Grindlay

"Sailing Away" is a 1986 single by a supergroup of New Zealand singers and personalities, to promote New Zealand yacht KZ 7 in the 1987 America's Cup. It spent nine weeks at #1 in the single chart, the longest run of a New Zealand single until 2009. While the song is conceptually similar to the many charity supergroup singles released in the mid 1980s, "Sailing Away" has its origins as a television advertisement and was not a charity record.

The song uses the melody of the Māori folk song "Pokarekare Ana", and is bookended with a verse of the original song sung by Michelle Sadgrove.

== All Of Us (in singing order) ==
- Dave Dobbyn (singer)
- Billy T. James (entertainer and comedian)
- Tim Finn (singer)
- Bunny Walters (singer)
- Barry Crump (author and personality)
- Annie Crummer (singer)
- Hammond Gamble (blues singer) and Beaver (jazz singer)
- John Hore Grenell and Suzanne Prentice (country singers)
- Satellite Spies (pop group)
  - Mark Loveys
  - Gordon Joll
  - David Curtis
  - Eddie Pausma
- Sonny Day (blues musician) and Jacqui Fitzgerald (jazz singer)
- Ray Woolf (entertainer) and Suzanne Lynch (singer)

Choir included:

- Dougal Stevenson (newsreader)
- Precious McKenzie (Commonwealth Games weightlifter)
- Peter Williams (newsreader)
- Peter Sinclair (entertainer)
- Graham Lowe (rugby league coach)
- Gray Bartlett (country singer)
- Roger Gascoigne (broadcaster)
- Ian Ferguson (Olympic canoeist)
- Paul MacDonald (Olympic canoeist)
- Chris Lewis (Wimbledon finalist)
- Glenn Turner (cricketer)
- Keith Quinn (sports broadcaster)
- Jeremy Coney (cricketer)
- Alex "Grizz" Wyllie (All Black coach)
- Marshall Seifert (art gallery owner)
- Members of the New Zealand Maori Chorale (in the back two rows).
- Parnell Primary School (Auckland)

== Charts ==
Chart (1986)	Peak position
New Zealand (Recorded Music NZ)	1

The single spent nine weeks at #1 in the New Zealand chart in 1986, the longest run for any single by a New Zealand artist until "Brother" by Smashproof and Gin Wigmore in 2009.

== Reception ==
New Zealand Herald entertainment critic Paul Casserly notes that the song reflects a different New Zealand: "We are no longer 'One nation on the water'. The chances of us all getting behind a yachting event to this extent again seem unlikely, absurd even." However, the song "Loyal" by Dave Dobbyn (who featured in "Sailing Away") would later be adopted by Team New Zealand for the 2003 America's Cup defence.
