= Big Norm =

Big Norm may refer to:

- Norman Kirk, Prime Minister of New Zealand, 1972–1974
  - "Big Norm", a song about Kirk released by Ebony in 1974
- A 1,600 lb (730 kg) pig; see List of individual pigs § Big Norm
