= Sandy Edmonds =

British-born pop singer and model (1948–2022)

- Also known as: Rosalie Edmondson-Corner
- Born: Rosalie L. Edmondson; 8 November 1948; Ormskirk, Lancashire, England
- Died: 19 December 2022 (aged 74) Melbourne, Australia
- Genres: Pop; pop rock
- Occupations: Singer, model
- Instrument: Vocals
- Years active: 1965–1970
- Labels: Zodiac; Festival
- Formerly of: The Pleazers; Climax; Sandy Edmonds Band

Sandy Edmonds (born Rosalie L. Edmondson, 8 November 1948 – 19 December 2022) was a British-born pop singer and model, who achieved widespread popularity in New Zealand in the 1960s. At the height of her popularity she was New Zealand's most recognizable teen idol. She recorded and released several singles, and appeared on television and in magazines until she unexpectedly dropped out of the scene, later living in Australia and, after her music career ended, becoming a fashion retailer.

== Biography ==
=== Early life ===
Edmondson was born on 8 November 1948 in Ormskirk, England, a market town 13 miles north of Liverpool. She relocated with her parents in early 1964 to Takapuna, near Auckland in New Zealand. Three months after her arrival, Edmondson had her first brush with fame when her picture appeared in The New Zealand Herald. The image depicted a jubilant Edmondson among an audience after a brief interaction with Paul McCartney when he was performing with The Beatles. After finishing school later in 1964, Edmondson worked as a dental assistant. Shortly afterwards, she sang "La Bamba" at a nightclub called The Delmonico which impressed the club manager, John Peal. Peal became her manager and invited television producer Peter Webb and record producer Eldred Stebbing to watch her perform. Equally impressed, Webb signed Edmondson to appear on the television series New Faces, while Stebbing signed her to a two-year recording contract with Zodiac Records.

=== Singing career ===
In 1965, she started working under the name Sandy Edmonds, and released her debut single, "Oh No Not My Baby" b/w "I Don't Understand". To promote the single, Edmonds toured within New Zealand, being backed by The Pleazers. In her recording career, Edmonds' singles sold successfully; however, the Official New Zealand Music Chart at the time only showcased a Top 20 based on voting, so none of her records charted. She regularly featured on television programs, including the children's program Yo Heave Ho and current affairs show Town and Around. As a result of her touring and television appearances, Edmonds became regarded for her looks, becoming the "mascot" for HMNZS Inverell on 27 August 1965.

In November 1965, Edmonds' manager, Peal, was replaced by Phil Warren. He substantially increased her commercial appearances in promoting various products, and secured a supporting role for her on The Rolling Stones and The Searchers joint tour. Following the tour, Edmonds was booked for public appearances outside New Zealand in countries including the Philippines, Singapore, and 27 broadcasts in Australia. Upon her return to New Zealand in November 1966, she began her most high-profile television role as a co-host with Mr. Lee Grant for the C'mon series, a role she held for a 26-week stint. The show revolved around teen culture, while Edmonds, Grant, and guest musicians performed pop numbers. As co-host, Edmonds' image became highlighted among youths for her musical capabilities and fashion sense, and as a pin-up girl.

In late 1966, Edmonds released her most successful single with her novelty song "I Love Onions". It was also her last record for the Zodiac label as Warren decided to start his own label, Festival Records. With the culmination of her existing commitments, fatigue started to set in for Edmonds. On 6 January 1967 she fell ill during a performance as a result of exhaustion, but continued to tour after she recovered. A debut studio album, The Sound of Sandy, was distributed in early 1967, the first record issued by the new label. The album was noted as being the first record in New Zealand to be recorded on stereo. After her obligations with the C'mon show were met in May 1967, Edmonds started another tour outside the country, fulfilling club engagements, and returned to conduct a month-long tour with C'mon cast members. Her next single, "Daylight Saving Time" b/w "The Power of Love", was released and chosen as a finalist in the 1967 Loxene Gold Disc Awards. As a result of the nomination, Edmonds was packaged in a four-week national tour, featuring other nominees. The tour was Edmonds' third national tour in nine months. Edmonds began to feel disillusioned with the music industry, following her second album and final single for the Festival label. Another collapse in the middle of a concert, along with her input in the recording studio being minimal, contributed to her withdrawal. Edmonds explained, "I wanted to do a lot more soul and R&B tracks but most of my suggestions fell on deaf ears". Still, for most of the year, she continued appearing on television, mainly during her stay in Sydney, and briefly starring in her own show, The Four Faces of Sandy.

After being released from hospital for the second time for issues relating to exhaustion, Edmonds signed a record deal with RCA Records, which included the promise of working with Nat Kipner in London. However, little came from the contract, recording-wise. She was offered the opportunity to replace Judith Durham in The Seekers in 1968, but turned it down. Edmonds decided to perform in low-key venues for the next six months with various groups in Australia, most notably the band Climax. She and the band released an obscure single on an independent label, the last recording of new material that included Edmonds. In a 2008 interview, she said: "I'd had enough, not because I didn't like it but that I wanted a complete change. I was walking away from a career that was looking like it was going to be very successful because all the avenues were open. I had the personality, I wore the clothes, I was up-to-date with everything, and I had contacts overseas. But I wanted something more than the entertainment industry."

=== Post-entertainment career ===
In 1970 she married, and decided to travel, spending the next eight years on the "hippie trail" visiting Bali, Burma, India, and elsewhere as well as having stays in Australia – where she made several appearances in the early 1970s with her own jazz-blues band, the Sandy Edmonds Band – the US, and London. After having her first child she returned to live in Melbourne, Australia, in the late 1970s, and set up a fashion shop, Penny Lane, with a friend. By this time using her birth name of Rosalie Edmondson, she then established her own fashion store, Picked by a Rose, designing and making her own fashions and catering to a high-status clientele. After remarrying and having her second child, she established a children's boutique in Melbourne. Her store, Shibuki, later concentrated on women's fashion, and she used the name Rosalie Edmondson-Corner.

In 2005, after it was discovered Edmondson was working in fashion, a compilation album with the same name as her debut album was released by EMI Records.

== Death ==
On 21 December 2022, Edmondson's death appeared on the New Zealand music history site AudioCulture, after notification by the family. She had died on 19 December 2022 in Melbourne, Australia after a short illness.
