= Jay Epae =

Māori pop singer (1933–1994)

- Promotional image of Epae published in Gisborne Photo News in 1967

Background information
- Born: Nicholas Epae; 7 March 1933; Manaia, Taranaki, New Zealand
- Origin: New Zealand
- Died: 25 July 1994 (aged 61) Wellington, New Zealand
- Genres: Pop
- Years active: 1960–1967
- Labels: American Mercury; American Capitol; Viking

Jay Epae (born Nicholas Epae; 7 March 1933 – 25 July 1994) was a Māori pop singer from New Zealand. Epae's 1960 single Putti Putti was a hit in Sweden and Finland after the Swedish pirate radio station Radio Nord picked it up, remaining on the Swedish charts for 44 weeks. In 1961, he became first New Zealander to have an international number 1 record in both countries.

Following his breakthrough in 1961, Epae began touring. His albums were released on the American Mercury label, and he signed to American Capitol in 1962. In 1966, Epae signed to New Zealand's Viking Records and wrote a hit single for Maria Dallas called Tumblin' Down, which won her the Loxene Golden Disc award.

Epae died on 25 July 1994 at the age of 61 after a period of ill health.

== Early life ==
Nicholas Epae was born on 7 March 1933 in Manaia, Taranaki, New Zealand. He was the third child of eight children, including the youngest Hector who would later become a member of The Māori Volcanics. His father, Tuni, served in the Pioneer Māori Battalion and was a farm hand, but was also a singer and performer. His mother, Manakore, died suddenly a short time after the birth of Hector in 1942.

Epae attended Normanby Public School but was considered a troublemaker and left aged 10. He excelled at boxing and pursued a short-lived career which ended when he won a fight but broke his wrist. Instead, he worked with one of his brothers on a farm owned by his uncle.

Around the age of 20 in 1953, Epae left Taranaki and moved to Sydney, Australia where he began his singing career in nightclubs. He moved to the United States in 1957.

== Discography ==
=== Albums ===
| Title | Details |
|---|---|
| Hold on tight! It's Jay Epae | Released: 1966; Label: Viking (VP212); Format: LP |

== Awards and nominations ==
=== Aotearoa Music Awards ===
| Year | Nominee / work | Award | Result | Ref. |
|---|---|---|---|---|
| 1966 | "I Need You" | Single of the Year | Nominated | |

== Personal life ==
Epae was married to Leona Laviscount, a New York-born singer and dancer and member of the Harlem Blackbirds who he met in Sydney in the mid-1950s. Their marriage came to an end around 1966, when Epae returned to New Zealand before heading to Australia to live in Brisbane the following year.

In his later life, Epae suffered from substance abuse issues, namely alcohol. In 1994, Epae began experiencing ill-health. His family reconnected with him after a tip-off from his landlady who was concerned for his well-being. Epae returned to New Zealand and stayed with family in Wellington. Months later on 25 July 1994, Epae was found dead on a Wellington street.
