= John Hanlon (singer) =

New Zealand singer and songwriter

John Hanlon (born 1949) is a New Zealand singer and songwriter. From 1974 to 1976, he collected three successive New Zealand Album of the Year and Songwriter of the Year awards, a feat achieved by no other artist before or since, as well as the APRA Silver Scroll two years in succession.

Though Hanlon was born in Malaya, he migrated to New Zealand during the 1960s. In 1978 he then moved to Australia running Sydney ad-agency LOUD. In recent years he has moved back to New Zealand where he continues to write books and play golf.

In 2024 he was presented with a Scroll of Honour from the Variety Artists Club of New Zealand for his contribution to New Zealand entertainment.

== Career ==
Musicians he played with include Frank Gibson Jnr., Bruce Lynch, Suzanne Lynch, Billy Kristian, Tommy Adderley, Dave MacRae and Symphonia of Auckland.

== Discography ==
=== Albums ===
- Floating – 1973
- Garden Fresh – 1974 NZ #28
- Higher Trails – 1975 NZ #7
- Use Your Eyes – 1976
- Short Stories – 1988
- The Very Best of John Hanlon – 2003
- Just Quietly – 2009
- 12 Shades of Blue – 2010
- After The Dam Broke – 2013, a double CD, 40 song compilation, Cd1 from the 70's and CD2 from then on. All track are re-mastered.
- Naked Truths – 2021

=== Singles ===
- "Damn the Dam" – 1973. Originally made as a 2-minute radio commercial for New Zealand Fibreglass as part of a campaign to make insulation compulsory in new homes, it became very popular and was released as a single by Hanlon on condition that the profits were donated to environmental bodies. It was a NZ #5. It was adopted by the opponents of the Lake Manapouri dam.
- "Knowing" – 1973
- "Shy Ann" – 1973
- "I Care" – 1974
- "Is It Natural" – 1974
- "Lovely Lady" – 1974 NZ #1
- "Apple Wine" – 1975 NZ #6
- "Higher Trails" – 1975 NZ #35
- "Romantically Inclined" – 1982
- "Don't It Ever Get You Down" – 1988
