= The Parker Project =

New Zealand pop band

- Origin: New Zealand
- Genres: Pop
- Years active: 1991
- Labels: Pagan Records

The Parker Project was a New Zealand pop band, best known for their cover of the Johnny Nash song "Tears on My Pillow", which went to number one on the NZ charts in 1991. The group recorded for Pagan Records. The song went gold for its sales in 1991–1992 in New Zealand. The band's follow-up single, "Looking For the Real Thing", reached #24; this was their last charting single.

Former member Dave Parker later played in the ukulele trio The Nukes.
