= The Yeomen (band) =

It is a new Zealand band of the 1960s

The Yeomen were a New Zealand band of the 1960s. It included Brian Borland, Peter Carter and Gordon Hubbard.

The Yeomen were best known for their song and jingle for Chesdale Cheese's Ches and Dale animated advertising campaign: "We are the boys from down on the farm, We really know our cheese..". The Chesdale song was written by Terry Grey. Their other songs included the single "Aotearoa" written by Borland. The Yeomen's most popular release was "Downtown Bus" which was number 1 on the New Zealand Hit Parade.

The Yeomen were finalists in the Golden Disc TV show with their song " Love is a Very Funny Thing". They performed a Royal Command performance for Queen Elizabeth, the Queen Mother in Whanganui.

== Awards and nominations ==
=== Aotearoa Music Awards ===
The Aotearoa Music Awards (previously known as New Zealand Music Awards (NZMA)) are an annual awards night celebrating excellence in New Zealand music and have been presented annually since 1965.

Year	Nominee / work	Award	Result	Ref.
1965	"Love Is a Very Funny Thing"	Single of the Year	Nominated	
1966	"Love Is a Very Funny Thing"	Single of the Year	Nominated	
