= The Avengers (New Zealand band) =

New Zealand rock band

The Avengers were a rock band from New Zealand. They were one of the country's most popular music groups of the 1960s along with The Fourmyula, and The Simple Image.

== Singles ==
Song title	Year released	NZ chart peak
"Everyone's Gonna Wonder"	1967	7
"Only Once in My Life"	1968	10
"1941"	1968	6
"Love Hate Revenge"	1968	2
"Days of Pearly Spencer"	1969	4
