= Ebony (band) =

Ebony was a New Zealand duo music band, best known for their 1974 hit "Big Norm", about New Zealand Prime Minister Norman Kirk. The band won the "Best Group" category at the 1974 RATA awards.

== Discography ==
- "Big Norm" (1974; #4 NZ Chart)
