= A Very Silent Night =

Single by The Underdogs
- Released: December 2007
- Recorded: 2007
- Label: Universal Music Group

"A Very Silent Night" is a single released in New Zealand exclusively for dogs. It was created by creatives Colin Mitchell and Alex Dyer, now at rascals.co.nz. It is a world first as the single cannot be heard by human ears and is only audible to animals capable of perceiving sounds outside the normal human hearing range, including dogs. The single was sold in December 2007 to raise funds for the Royal New Zealand Society for the Prevention of Cruelty to Animals (SPCA). The music video for the song featured New Zealand artist Dei Hamo. It reached number one on 24 December 2007 and became the New Zealand Christmas number one. The next week the song dropped from number one to number sixteen on the chart.

== Track listing ==
1. "A Very Silent Night"
2. "A Very Silent Night" (instrumental)
