= Life Begins at Forty (song) =

Single by Dave and the Dynamos
- Released: 1983
- Genre: Novelty song, pop
- Length: 3:46
- Songwriter(s): Dave Luther

"Life Begins at Forty" is a 1983 one-hit wonder novelty pop song from New Zealand band Dave and the Dynamos. The single peaked at number one in the New Zealand charts, a position it held for three weeks in September 1983. The song peaked at number 35 in Australia in November 1983.

== Background ==
The song was originally performed by singer and songwriter Dave Luther's folk pop group Hogsnort Rupert, as part of a skit involving an aging rock band. The song's popularity saw the song released as a single with the group Dave and the Dynamos created to perform it. The band was composed of Luther, Kevin Findlater and Bernie Reber.

Dave and the Dynamos released two further singles, "Can't Spell Rhythm" and "Don't Make Me the Last Thing on your Mind", neither of which charted. The group were unable to maintain the popularity of their earlier single and were absorbed back into Hogsnort Rupert.

== Music video ==
The song featured an elaborate music video, filmed at Avalon Studios, with multiple sets and a large cast.
