= Bulldogs Allstar Goodtime Band =

New Zealand pop band

Bulldogs Allstar Goodtime Band was a New Zealand novelty pop band formed in 1972 by a group of students at the Wellington Teachers Training College. They were finalists in television's New Faces show in 1973 with their song "Miss September", coming ahead of the band Split Enz in their first TV appearance. The Bulldogs are best known for their two hits, "Miss September" and "Everyone Knows", which both reached the top 5 of the New Zealand Singles Chart. The band split up in 1975.

Neil Worboys, who founded the Bulldogs, went on to join the Timeliners in the 1980s. In 2015 the band reunited, to launch a greatest hits CD and play a charity gig at the Wellington Botanic Gardens. Members of the Bulldogs band joined with members from other groups, including Hogsnort Rupert, to form the Hogsnort Bulldogs Goodtime Band, which played a series of sold-out shows in 2023.

== Awards ==
In 1974 the band won a RATA award, in the "Artist of the Year" category.

== Discography ==
=== Album ===
- Bulldoggin' (1974)

=== Singles ===
- "Miss September" / "Bulldogs" (1973) [#2 NZ Chart]
- "Everyone Knows" / "Ze Camel" (1973) [#3 NZ Chart]
- "Baby Get Out" / "Dance The Stars Away" (1974)
- "Television Mama" / "Day in the Sun" (1974)
