= Tears on My Pillow (Johnny Nash song) =

Single by Johnny Nash

from the album Tears on My Pillow
- B-side: "Beautiful Baby"
- Released: 1975
- Recorded: 1975
- Length: 3:15
- Label: Epic
- Songwriter: Ernie Smith
- Producers: Johnny Nash, Ken Khouri

Johnny Nash singles chronology
"(You Gave Me Such) Good Vibrations" (1975)	"Tears on My Pillow" (1975)	"Let's Be Friends" (1975)

Official audio
- "Tears on My Pillow" on YouTube

"Tears on My Pillow" is a song by American singer Johnny Nash, written by Ernie Smith and produced by Nash and Ken Khouri, It was the sole number-one single in the UK Singles Chart for Nash, spending a single week at the top of the chart July 12, 1975. Arranged in a reggae style, the song features a spoken recitation in the middle.

This song is not to be confused with the 1958 hit for Little Anthony and the Imperials. Both songs have the words "Tears on my Pillow/ Pain in my Heart".

New Zealand act The Parker Project, covered this song in 1991, reaching No. 1 on the New Zealand chart in June of that year.

== Charts ==
=== Year-end charts ===
The Parker Project version

Chart (1991)	Position
New Zealand (Recorded Music NZ)	22
