= Shoop Shoop Diddy Wop Cumma Cumma Wang Dang =

1982 single by Monte Video and the Cassettes

Single by Monte Video and the Cassettes

from the album Monte Video
- B-side: "Don't Mention My Name"
- Released: 1982
- Length: 2:37
- Label: Mushroom N.Z.
- Songwriters: Murray Grindlay, Mark Ackerman
- Producer: Murray Grindlay

Monte Video and the Cassettes singles chronology
"Shoop Shoop Diddy Wop Cumma Cumma Wang Dang" (1982)	"Sheba (Sha Sha She Shoo)" (1983)

Audio
- "Shoop Shoop Diddy Wop Cumma Cumma Wang Dang" on YouTube

"Shoop Shoop Diddy Wop Cumma Cumma Wang Dang" is a song by New Zealand band Monte Video and the Cassettes. It was released as the band's debut single in 1982 and reached number two on the New Zealand RIANZ Singles Chart, as well as number 11 on the Australian Kent Music Report. The track appears on Monte Video's 1983 self-titled mini-album and was later released in the United Kingdom and United States.

== Reception ==
New Zealand film and television website NZ on Screen called the song "dangerously catchy" and called its video "hedonistic". In 1983, the song was nominated for two New Zealand Music Awards: Single of the Year and Producer of the Year. It lost the former category to DD Smash's "Outlook for Thursday" and the latter nomination to Coconut Rough's "Sierra Leone", produced by Dave Marrett. Commercially, the song peaked at number two on New Zealand's RIANZ Singles Chart, spending three consecutive weeks at the position in February 1983 and remaining in the top 50 for 13 weeks. At the end of the year, "Shoop Shoop" was ranked at number 47 on the New Zealand year-end chart. The single also charted in Australia, where it reached number 11 on the Kent Music Report.

== Music video ==
The song's music video, filmed at Ponsonby's Peppermint Park nightclub in Auckland, was directed by Murray Grindlay (Monte Video) and Mark Ackerman. The video features numerous uses of alcohol and tobacco and includes several transvestites. The clip was nominated for Best Music Video at the 1983 New Zealand Music Awards, losing to the video for "Outlook for Thursday".

== Charts ==
=== Weekly chart ===
Chart (1982–1983)	Peak position
Australia (Kent Music Report)	11
New Zealand (Recorded Music NZ)	2

=== Year-end chart ===
Chart (1983)	Position
Australia (Kent Music Report)	65
New Zealand (RIANZ)	47
