= Recording Arts Talent Awards =

The Recording Arts Talent Awards (RATA) were an annual award honouring excellence in recorded New Zealand music. The RATAs ran from 1973 to 1976, before being replaced by the RIANZ Awards.

== History ==
The RATAs were founded in 1973 when the New Zealand Federation of Phonographic Industry decided to institute a new award to replace the Loxene Golden Disc award. Federation member Fred Smith claimed that block voting in the Loxene Golden Disc's public vote was "making a farce" of the awards, so the RATAs were determined by a panel of judges. Despite the state monopoly on radio stations being broken in 1970, in order to qualify for the RATA awards, all nominated songs had to have been broadcast by the NZBC.

The final RATA was held in 1976. After a year off in 1978, the awards became known as the RIANZ Awards (later the New Zealand Music Awards) after the NZFPI changed its name to the Recording Industry Association of New Zealand (RIANZ).

== Winners ==
=== 1973 winners ===
Award	Winner
Album of the Year	John Donoghue - Spirit of Pelorus Jack
Recording Artist/Group of the Year	Shona Laing
Best Single/Single of the Year	John Hanlon – "Damn the Dam"
Best New Artist	Shona Laing
Best New Zealand Recorded Composition	Anna Leah - "Love Bug"
Producer of the Year	Keith Southern - "Join Together"
Engineer of the Year	Peter Hitchcock - "Only Time Could Let Us Know"
Arranger of the Year	Mike Harvey – "Damn the Dam"

=== 1974 winners ===
Award	Winner
Best New Artist	Bunny Walters
Best male vocalist	Bunny Walters
Artist of the Year	Bulldogs Allstar Goodtime Band
Best Group	Ebony
Best New Zealand Recorded Composition	John Hanlon - "Is It Natural"
Producer of the Year	Mike Harvey - "Is It Natural"
Arranger of the Year	Mike Harvey - "Is It Natural"

=== 1975 winners ===
Award	Winner
Album of the Year	John Hanlon – Higher Trails
Best Single/Single of the Year	Rockinghorse – "Through the Moonlight"
Recording Artist/Group of the Year	Mark Williams
Best New Artist	Space Waltz
Producer of the Year	Alan Galbraith – "Yesterday Was Just the Beginning of my Life"
Engineer of the Year	Phil Yule – "Higher Trails"
Arranger of the Year	Mike Harvey – "Higher Trails"
Composer of the Year	John Hanlon – "Higher Trails"

=== 1976 winners ===
Award	Winner
Album of the Year	New Zealand Symphony Orchestra - Symphony #2
Recording Artist/Group of the Year	Dr Tree
Best New Artist	Dr Tree
Producer of the Year	Alan Galbraith - "Taking it all in Stride"
Engineer of the Year	Peter Hitchcock - "Taking it all in Stride"
Arranger of the Year	David Fraser - "Taking it all in Stride"
Composer of the Year	John Hanlon - Night Life

=== 1977 winners ===
After 1976, there were no further RATA ceremonies. However, at the 1977 APRA Silver Scroll ceremony, NZFPI presented a $500 prize for Best Rock Composition. This award went to Dave Calder of The Waves for his song "Conversation Over to You".
