= Monte Video and the Cassettes =

Monte Video and the Cassettes were a New Zealand band that wrote the hit single "Shoop Shoop Diddy Wop Cumma Cumma Wang Dang".

== About the band ==
Monte Video and the Cassettes consisted of Murray Grindlay. Murray was an ex-member of 1960s New Zealand band The Underdogs, but is better known today in New Zealand as the writer and voice of many advertising jingles (notably the Crunchie train robbery advertisement).

== Discography ==
=== Studio albums ===
Title	Album details
Monte Vidéo	Released: 1983; Format: LP; Label: Mushroom (L 29020)

=== Singles ===
List of singles, with Australian chart positions
Year	Title	Peak chart positions		Album
Year	Title	NZ	AUS	Album
1982	"Shoop Shoop, Diddy Wop, Cumma Cumma, Wang Dang"	2	11	Monte Vidéo
1983	"Sheba (Sha Sha She Shoo)"	-	-	Monte Vidéo
