= The Pleazers =

Australian band

- Also known as: G-Men
- Origin: Brisbane, Queensland, Australia
- Genres: R&B; pop; rock and roll
- Years active: 1964–1967
- Label: Zodiac
- Past members: see Members

The Pleazers was an Australian-formed rhythm and blues musical group which were popular in New Zealand. They began in Brisbane as the G-Men in 1964. They released a sole studio album, Definitely Pleazers, in 1966, before disbanding in the following year.

== History ==
The Pleazers began in Brisbane in 1964 as the G-Men with the line-up of Jim Cerezo on lead guitar, Dennis Gilmore on drums, Vince Lipton on bass guitar, Billy London on vocals and Peter Newing on rhythm guitar. They soon moved to Sydney, changed their name to the Pleazers, with the line-up of Gilmore, London and Newing joined by Bobby Bacon (a.k.a. Bob Cooper, a.k.a. Bob London: Billy's brother) on lead vocals, Bruce "Phantom" Robinson on lead guitar, and Ronnie Peel (ex-Mystics, the Missing Links) on bass guitar.

The Pleazers were signed by Eldred Stebbing of Zodiac Records, who brought them to his home base in Auckland, New Zealand in 1965. They soon appeared on a local TV show, Let's Go. Their initial single, "Last Night", did poorly, while its follow-up, a cover version of Them's "Gloria" (February 1965), broke into the national singles chart. Richie Unterberger of AllMusic described the band as "one of the only New Zealand groups competently playing tough, British Invasion/R&B-styled rock & roll."

Early in 1966 Bacon was replaced by English-born vocalist Shane Hales (a.k.a. Trevor Hales). They issued a five-track extended play, A Midnight Rave with the Pleazers, in March with the line-up of Gilmore, Hales, London, Newing, Peel and Robertson. One of its tracks, "Bald Headed Woman", was included on a various artists' compilation CD, Pebbles, Volume 12: The World (October 1999).

The Pleazers released their debut studio album Definitely Pleazers in 1966 on the Zodiac label, which was produced by John Hawkins. They returned to Australia later that year with Gus Fenwick (ex-Layabouts) replacing Peel on bass guitar. The group disbanded in 1967. Raven Records issued a compilation album A Midnight Rave with the Pleazers in 1987. Unterberger rated it as three out of five stars and opined that the compilation was "focusing mostly on their original material. Competent British Invasion-style rock, usually in a Stonesy style, though sometimes in a poppier vein."

== Members ==
- Jim Cerezo – lead guitar (Ex G-Men 1964)
- Denis 'Speedy' Gilmore – drums (Ex G-Men 1964)
- Vince Lipton – bass guitar (Ex G-Men 1964)
- Billy Bacon (London) – lead vocals (Ex The London Bros 1964)
- Peter 'Bunt' Newing – rhythm guitar (Ex G-Men 1964)
- Bob Cooper–(a.k.a. London) lead vocals (Ex The London Bros 1964)
- Bruce "Phantom" Robinson –lead guitar (The Pleazers January 1965)
- Ronnie Peel – bass guitar (Ex Missing Links Sydney 1965)
- Shane Hales (a.k.a. Trevor Hales) – lead vocals (NZ 1965)
- Gus Fenwick – bass guitar (ex The Layabouts 1966)

== Discography ==
=== Albums ===
- Definitely Pleazers (1966) – Zodiac Records (ZLP 1026)
- A Midnight Rave with the Pleazers (compilation album, 1987) – Raven Records.

=== Extended plays ===
- A Midnight Rave with the Pleazers (March 1966) Zodiac Records (EPZ 133)
  - "Baby Jane" (Dello, Cane), "Thou Shalt Not Steal" (John D. Loudermilk), "I'm Movin' On", "Bald Headed Woman" (Talmy), "Don't Give Me no Lip Child" (Thomas, Richards)

=== Singles ===
- "Last Night" / "Poor Girl" (1965)
- "Gloria" / "That Lonely Feeling" (1965)
- "Like Columbus Did" (Hales, London) / "Sometimes" (G. Thomasson) (1965)
- "Is It Over, Baby" / "Hurtin' All Over" (1966)
- "Guilty" / "Can't Pretend" (1966)
- "Here Today" (Wilson, Asher) / "La La Lies" (Townshend) (1967)
- "Three Cool Cats" / "Security" (1967)
