= Shane (New Zealand singer) =

New Zealand singer

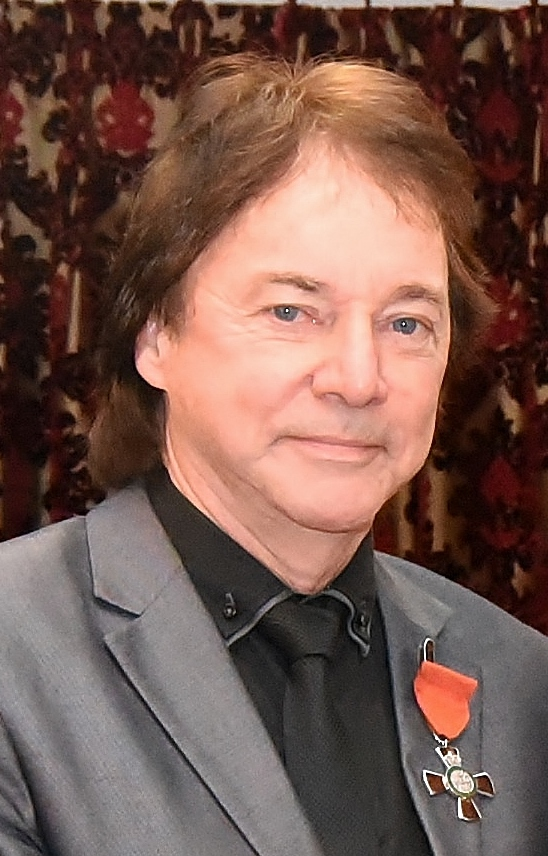
Shane in 2017

Shane Paul Arthur Hales MNZM (born 15 May 1946), known by the stage name Shane and for some of the early part of his career as Trevor Hales, is a New Zealand singer who had several top-10 hits in that country's singles chart in the 1960s and 1970s.

== Biography ==
Shane grew up in Guildford, Surrey, England, attending Park Barn Secondary School, before moving to Australia and then New Zealand in the mid-1960s. Shane started his career in 1966 as a member of Australian band The Pleazers, who spent much of their career in Auckland. Shane was briefly a member of Auckland band The Jamestown Union in 1967 before forming his own band, Shane. This band recorded a single, "The Town of Tuxley Toymaker" in 1968. While playing a gig in 1968, Shane was approached by television producer Kevan Moore to become a regular singer on the television pop programme C'mon. Shane accepted, and was a regular feature on the show from its second season on.

Shane was taken under the wing of New Zealand pop icon Ray Columbus, who became Shane's manager. Several singles were released, among them the Columbus-penned "I'll Take You Back With Me", but they did not trouble the national chart.

At the end of 1968, Shane became part of the C'mon 1968 national tour and became popular enough to be offered a contract by His Master's Voice. A first single, a cover of the Harry Nilsson the Monkees song "Cuddly Toy" failed to fire, but the follow-up, a cover of Terry Knight's paean to Paul McCartney, "Saint Paul", captured the public imagination and flew to the top of the charts, where it stayed for six weeks. The recording won the 1969 Loxene Golden Disc award for best New Zealand record of the year. A follow-up single, "Lady Samantha" also reached the top five. Shane's debut album, Rainy Day Man, was released at the end of the year. A second album, Natural Man, was released the following year, along with two more singles, "Heya" and "Get It Together".

Interest began to pick up for Shane internationally, and to cash in on it, Shane embarked on an overseas tour, spending two months in Germany where he shared billing with Andy Kim and Christie. While he was touring, he received word of the death of his fiancée Jan Campbell in a car crash in New Zealand and flew back home. He used the recording of his third album as catharsis. The album, Straight Straight Straight, included two songs written about Campbell.

Shane returned to Europe soon after the album's release, spending most of the rest of the 1970s in and around London, where he formed a new band, Killa-Hz. After a stage accident in 1980 in which Shane broke his pelvis, Killa-Hz disbanded, and after recovering from his injuries he returned to New Zealand in 1981. He continued to record music, with four singles issued in New Zealand between 1981 and 1986.

Shane was appointed a member of the New Zealand Order of Merit, for services to entertainment, in the 2017 Queen's Birthday Honours. Shane has continued to perform music regularly into the 2010s and beyond.
