= The Chicks (duo) =

New Zealand singing sibling duo

The Chicks were a New Zealand singing sibling duo, active in the 1960s. Sisters Judy and Sue Donaldson scored several hits in their native country, including "Miss You Baby", which sounded similar to a song released by Lynne Randell entitled "Ciao Baby". After they split up, Sue launched a successful solo career as Suzanne Lynch, or simply, Suzanne. The Chicks were one of the local New Zealand acts who performed at Redwood 70, the first major modern music festival held in New Zealand in 1970.

On 25 June 2020, the American band formerly known as "the Dixie Chicks" changed their name to The Chicks, dropping the word "Dixie". The band received Judy and Sue's blessings to share the name.

== Discography ==
=== Studio albums ===
List of studio albums
Title	Details
The Sound of the 'Chicks'	Released: 1965; Label: Viking (VP157); Format: LP
2nd Album	Released: 1966; Label: Viking (VP186); Format: LP
C'Mon Chicks	Released: 1968; Label: Polydor (621001); Format: LP
A Long Time Comin'	Released: 1970; Label: Polydor (621008); Format: LP

=== Live albums ===
List of live albums
Title	Details
Live On The Dinah Lee Show (with Dinah Lee, Tommy Adderley and Lonnie Lee)	Released: 1965; Label: Viking (VP175); Format: LP

=== Compilation albums ===
List of compilation albums
Title	Details
The Chicks Greatest Hits	Released: 1968; Label: Festival Records (SFLZ 921); Format: LP
The Best of The Chicks	Released: 1970; Label: Music for Leisure (98); Format: LP
The Very Best of The Chicks	Released: 1999; Label: EMI (5228552); Format: CD

=== Extended plays ===
List of EPs
Title	Details
The Chicks	Released: 1965; Label: Viking (VE180); Format: 7" LP
Heat Wave	Released: 1965; Label: Viking (VE192); Format: 7" LP

=== Singles ===
List of singles
Title	Year	Album
"Heart of Stone"	1965	The Sound of The 'Chicks'
"Hucklebuck"	1965	The Chicks
"Do You Want to Dance?" (with Peter Posa)	1965	
"Java Jones"	1965	
"Cumala Be-Stay"	1965	2nd Album
"Tweedle Dee"	1966	
"You Won't Forget Me"	1967	
"Say a Prayer for Michael"	1969	
"Miss You Baby"	1969	A Long Time Comin'
"Stoney End"	1969	A Long Time Comin'
"I Will See You There "	1970	A Long Time Comin'

== Awards ==
=== Aotearoa Music Awards ===
The Aotearoa Music Awards (previously known as New Zealand Music Awards (NZMA)) are an annual awards night celebrating excellence in New Zealand music and have been presented annually since 1965.

Year	Nominee / work	Award	Result	Ref.
1965	"Hucklebuck"	Single of the Year	Nominated	
1968	"River Deep-Mountain High"	Single of the Year	Nominated	
1969	"Miss You Baby"	Single of the Year	Nominated	
2020	The Chicks	New Zealand Music Hall of Fame	inductee	
