= The Mockers =

New Zealand pop band

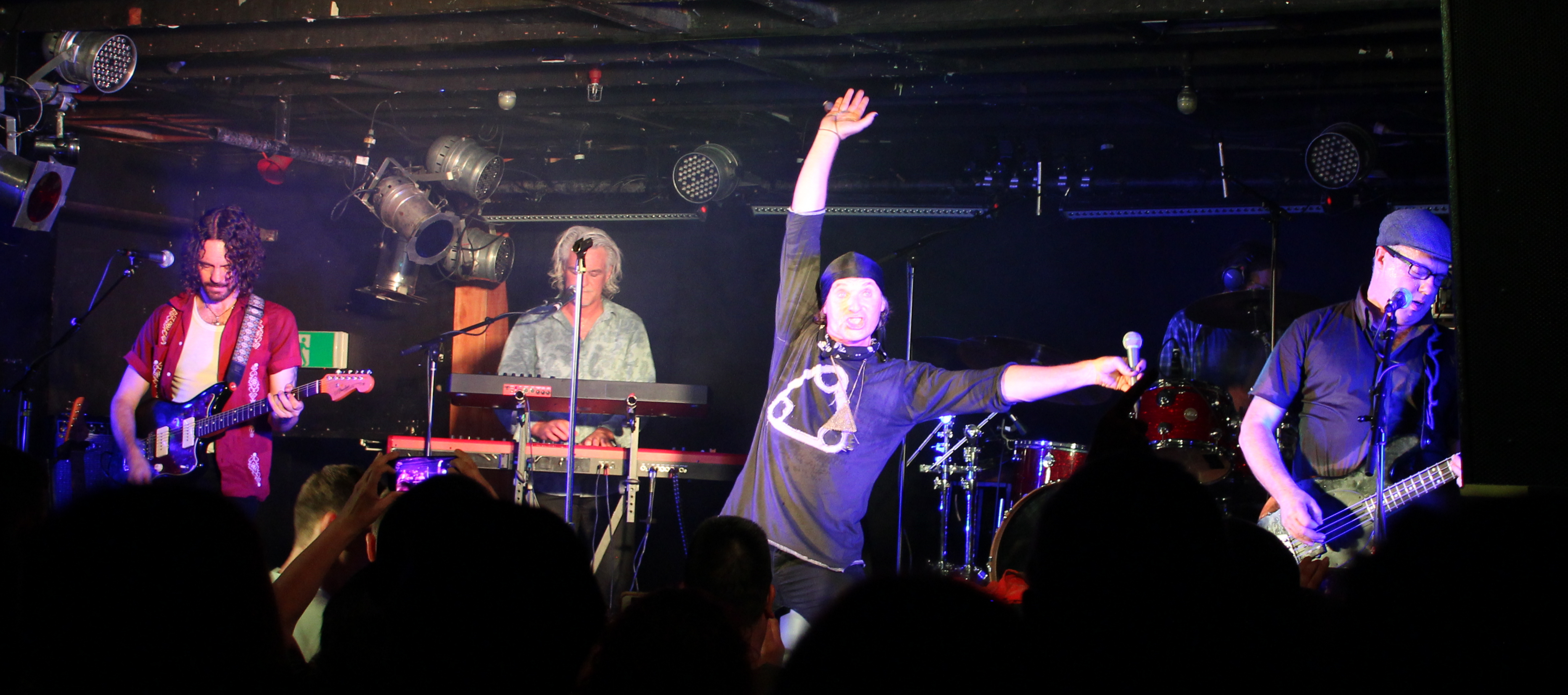
- Performance

Background information
- Origin: Wellington, New Zealand
- Genre: Pop
- Years active: 1979–1988
- Labels: RCA, BMG
- Past members: Andrew Fagan; Gary Curtis; Charlie Mannell; Dale Monaghan; Dean Hazlewood; Geoff Hayden; Tim Wedde; Barry Caitcheon; Brett Adams; Murray Costello; Gordon Costello; Brendan Fitzgerald; Steve Thorpe (deceased); Paul Lightfoot

The Mockers were a New Zealand pop band formed in Wellington in 1979 by Andrew Fagan. Fagan was the only ever-present of the band's line-up whose initial members were mostly drawn from Fagan's Rongotai College classmates. Their most well-known songs include "One Black Friday" and "Forever Tuesday Morning". The Mockers' style drew on punk and new wave influences from the UK and performances centred on Fagan's flamboyant stage presence. Other band members included Charlie Mannell (drums), Gary Curtis (keyboards, vocals), Steve Thorpe (drums), Dale Monaghan (guitar), Dean Hazlewood, Brett Adams (guitar), Geoff Hayden (bass), Tim Wedde (keyboards), Murray Costello, Gordon Costello, Brendan Fitzgerald, Barry Caitcheon and Paul Lightfoot (guitar).

The group broke up in 1988, after which Fagan embarked on a solo career. Since then, they have periodically reunited for various concert tours, most recently the Sounds Series in 2024.

== Discography ==
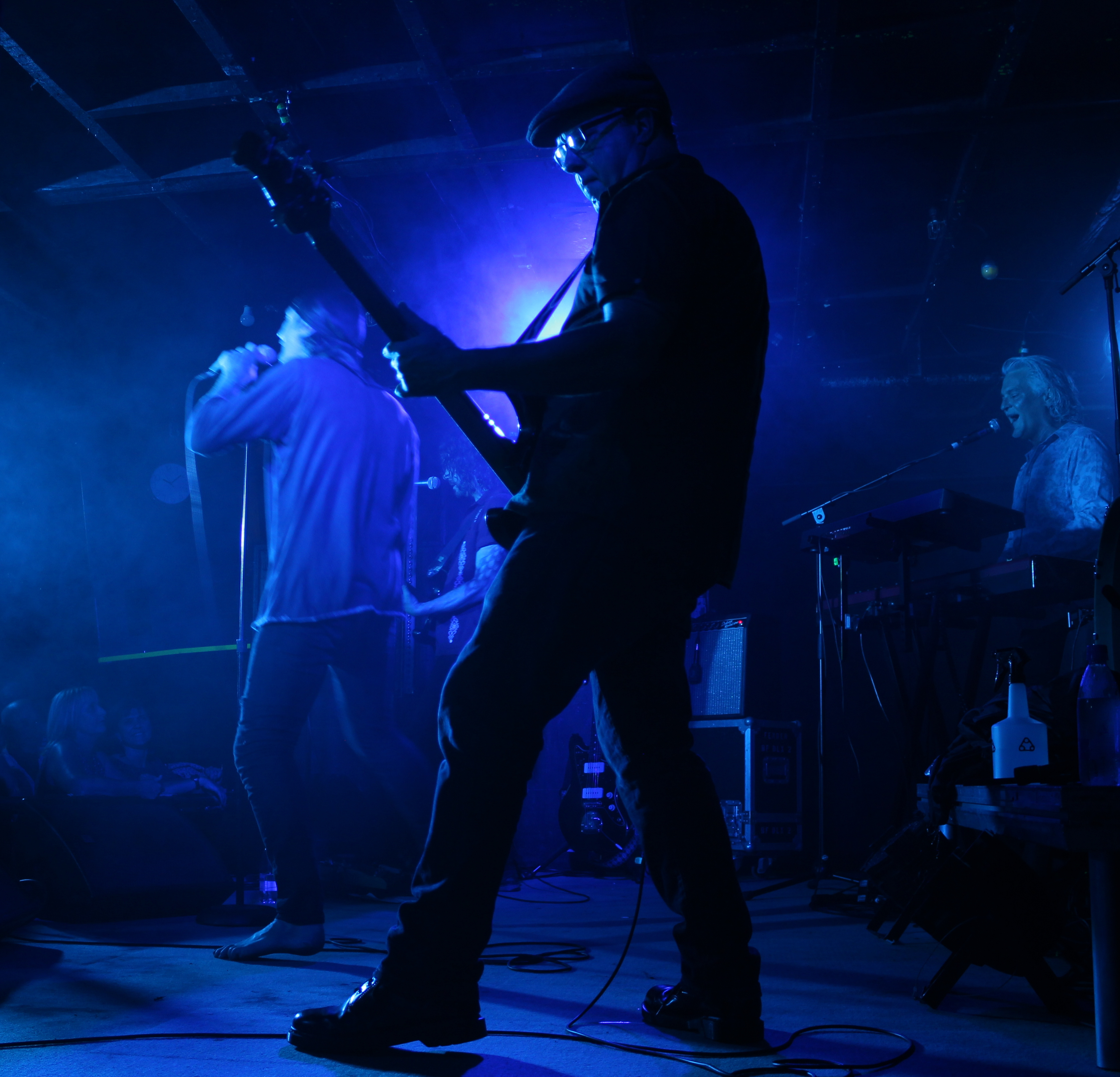
Bassist Geoff Hayden

=== Albums ===
Title	Details	Peak chart positions
Title	Details	NZ
Swear It's True	Released: 1984; Label: Reaction (REAL 013); Format: LP, cassette	4
Culprit and the King	Released: 1985; Label: RCA (VLP1 0524); Format: LP, cassette	9
Emperor's New Clothes	Released: 1987; Label: RCA (VPL1 0636); Format: LP, cassette	—
"—" denotes a recording that did not chart or was not released in that territory.

=== Live albums ===
Year	Title	Details	Peak chart positions
Year	Title	Details	NZ
Caught in the Act!	Released: 1984; Label: Reaction (REAM 017); Format: LP, cassette; Recorded at the Mainstreet Cabaret in Auckland on 13 June 1984	12	
Live at the Powerstation	Released: 2018; Label: Plus1 (PLUS1-004); Format: DVD, 2CD	— (Note: Live at the Powerstation did not enter the NZ Top 40 Albums Chart, but peaked at number three on the NZ Heatseeker Albums Chart.)	
"—" denotes a recording that did not chart or was not released in that territory.

=== Compilation albums ===
Title	Details	Peak chart positions
Title	Details	NZ
The First Five Years	Released: 1986; Label: RCA (VPLI 0618); Format: LP, cassette	—
Woke Up Today: The Definitive Collection	Released: 2007; Label: Sony BMG (88697128212); Format: CD, digital download	10
"—" denotes a recording that did not chart or was not released in that territory.

=== Singles ===
Title	Year	Peak chart positions	Album
Title	Year	NZ	Album
"Good Old Days" / "Murder on Manners St."	1980	—	Non-album single
"Woke Up Today"	1981	—	Swear It's True
"Trendy Lefties"	1981	—	Non-album single
"My Girl Thinks She's Cleopatra"	1983	36	Swear It's True
"Swear It's True"	1983	19	Swear It's True
"Alvison Park"	1983	39	Swear It's True
"The Good Old Days"	1984	—	Swear It's True
"Forever Tuesday Morning"	1984	2	Culprit and the King
"One Black Friday"	1985	8	Culprit and the King
"Seven Years Not Wasted"	1985	18	Culprit and the King
"Another Boring Day in the Amazon"	1985	—	Culprit and the King
"A Winter's Tale"	1986	—	Culprit and the King
"Far From The Madding Crowd"	1986	—	Emperor's New Clothes
"Shield Yourself"	1987	—	Emperor's New Clothes
"—" denotes a recording that did not chart or was not released in that territory.

== Awards ==
Year	Nominee / work	Award	Result
1984	Swear It's True	1984 New Zealand Music Awards - Album of the Year	Nominated
1984	Andrew Fagan	1984 New Zealand Music Awards - Top Male Vocalist	Nominated
1984	The Mockers	1984 New Zealand Music Awards - Top Group	Nominated
1985	"Forever Tuesday Morning"	1985 New Zealand Music Awards - Single of the Year	Nominated
1985	Andrew Fagan	1985 New Zealand Music Awards - Best Male Vocalist	Won
1985	The Mockers	1985 New Zealand Music Awards - Best Group	Nominated
1985	Glyn Tucker "Forever Tuesday Morning"	1985 New Zealand Music Awards - Best Producer	Nominated

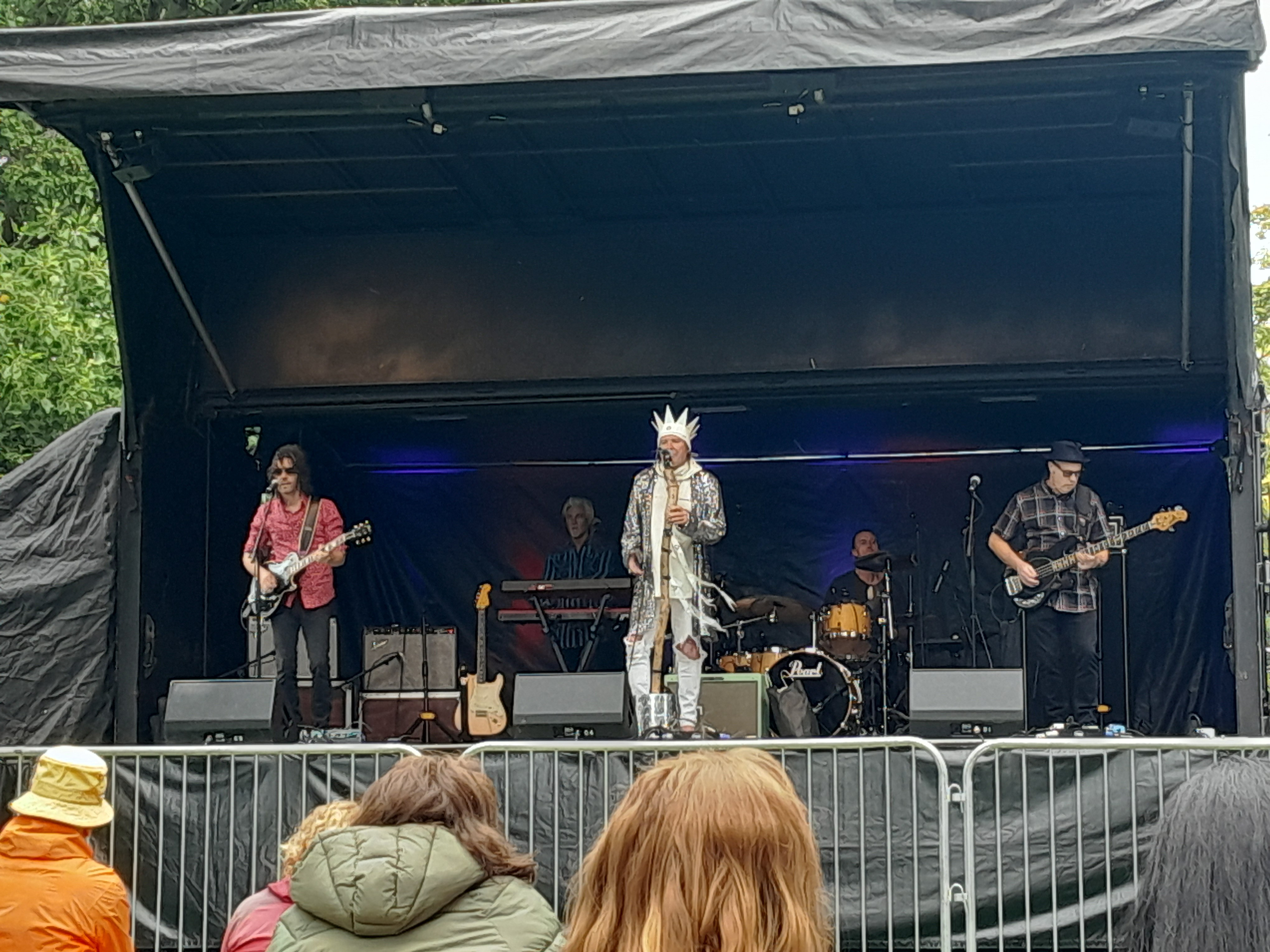
The Mockers performing in Christchurch, New Zealand in 2026

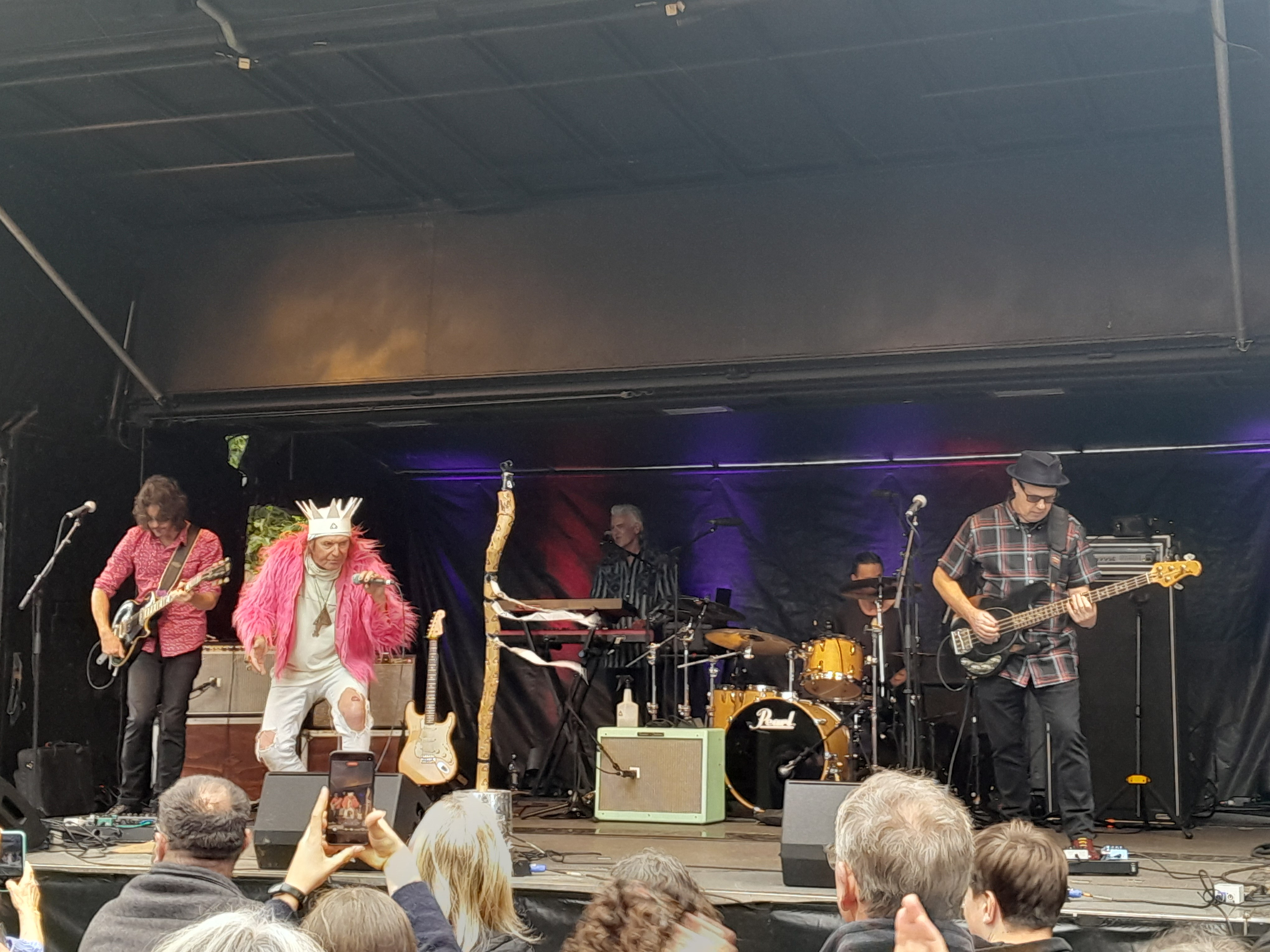
The Mockers performing in Christchurch, New Zealand in 2026
