= Tommy Adderley =

New Zealand singer

Thomas Arthur Adderley (7 April 1940 – 5 February 1993) was a New Zealand singer.

Adderley was born in Birmingham, England in 1940. He later managed Auckland's Top 20s club, and in the 1970s was best known as leader of Tommy Adderley's Head Band. He died in Takapuna in 1993 at age 52.

== Discography ==
=== Studio albums ===
List of studio albums
Title	Details
Tommy'	Released: 1965; Label: RCA Victor (RPL 3399); Format: LP

=== Live albums ===
List of live albums
Title	Details
Live on the Dinah Lee Show (with Dinah Lee, Lonnie Lee and The Chicks)	Released: 1965; Label: Viking (VP175); Format: LP

== Awards and nominations ==
=== Aotearoa Music Awards ===
The Aotearoa Music Awards (previously known as New Zealand Music Awards (NZMA)) are an annual awards night celebrating excellence in New Zealand music and have been presented annually since 1965.

Year	Nominee / work	Award	Result	Ref.
1965	"Like Dreamers Do"	Single of the Year	Nominated	
