= Maria Dallas =

New Zealand musician (born 1946)

- Born: Marina Devcich; 14 April 1946 (age 80); Morrinsville, New Zealand
- Genres: Country, Pop
- Label: Viking Records

Maria Dallas (born Marina Devcich; 14 April 1946) is a New Zealand country music singer.

She was discovered at a talent contest in small town of Morrinsville, New Zealand. Her first single "Tumblin' Down", written by Jay Epae, released in 1966 and made it to #11 in the charts. It also won her a Loxene Golden Disc award. She released several albums and singles and starred in the New Zealand television series Golden Girl before moving on to Australia in 1967. Her single "Ambush", which charted #20 in Australia, was recorded in Nashville, produced by Felton Jarvis. She returned to New Zealand in 1970 and scored a #1 hit with the song "Pinocchio". The song spent six weeks at number one during the autumn of the year. In total, Dallas produced at least 10 albums and 25 singles. "Pinocchio" peaked at number 96 in Australia in March 1971.

== Personal life ==
Dallas met Barry Kairl while she was performing in Brisbane, and he became her manager. They married in 1968, and had a daughter in May 1969. The relationship ended in 1983.

== Discography ==
=== Studio albums ===
- Country Girl (1966, Viking)
- The Second Album (1966, Viking)
- Maria Dallas In Nashville (1967, Viking)
- Western Take-Off (1967, Viking)
- Face To Face (1967, Viking)
- Tumblin' Down (1968, RCA Victor)
- Pinocchio (1970, Viking)
- Town And Country (1972, Viking)

== Awards and nominations ==
=== Aotearoa Music Awards ===
The Aotearoa Music Awards (previously known as New Zealand Music Awards (NZMA)) are an annual awards night celebrating excellence in New Zealand music and have been presented annually since 1965.

Year	Nominee / work	Award	Result	Ref.
1966	"Tumbling Down"	Single of the Year	Won	
1967	"Handy Man"	Single of the Year	Nominated	
