= The Hi-Revving Tongues =

New Zealand rock band

The Hi-Revving Tongues were a New Zealand rock band from Auckland, led by vocalist/songwriter Chris Parfitt.

The group was founded in 1967 by Parfitt, Mike Balcombe, bassist John Walmsley, organist Bruce Coleman, and drummer Rob Noad. The group reached #1 for 2 weeks in 1969 with the single "Rain and Tears", a cover of a song by Aphrodite's Child. That same year, the group did a six-month residency at the Whiskey-a-Go-Go in Sydney, Australia. In 1970, the band performed at Redwood 70, the first major modern music festival held in New Zealand. This would be their final performance together, billed as the Hi-Revving Tongues. The group later performed simply as The Tongues and then as Caboose, and split up in 1972.
