= Larry's Rebels =

New Zealand garage rock band

Background information
- Also known as: The Rebels
- Origin: Ponsonby, New Zealand
- Genres: Garage rock; pop rock; psychedelic pop
- Years active: 1964–1970
- Labels: Philips; Impact
- Past members: Larry Morris; John Williams; Terry Rouse; Viv McCarthy; Dennis "Nooky" Stott; Mal Logan; Brian Henderson; Glyn Mason

Larry's Rebels were a garage rock band, formed in Ponsonby, New Zealand, in 1964. The band had a relatively stable lineup, and had several nationally charting singles in New Zealand and Australia. Their musical genres ranged from blues rock to psychedelic pop, with lead vocalist Larry Morris having a versatile vocal range. The band later merged British Invasion and American musical influences into their repertoire.

== History ==
=== Beginnings ===
In 1962, classmates of the Seddon Tech institute, John Williams (lead guitar), Dennis "Nooky" Stott (drums), Harry Leki (bass guitar), and Terry Rouse (keyboards, rhythm guitar) formed a band known as the Young Ones. For all the musicians, the ensemble was their first attempt at a professional musical career, and within a brief period they developed a sound rooted in rock and roll and blues. Soon, the band was enamoured with the music of the Shadows and Bill Black, both of whom they incorporated into their live repertoire. As the Young Ones operated on the local dance club circuit, the band transitioned through several bass guitarists, and would not retain an enduring bassist until the group reorganized into Larry's Rebels. After Leki departed from the band, he later joined the successful group, the Simple Image. The group encountered Robert Handlin, a television producer, who possessed numerous contacts in the music industry. Handlin negotiated with Paul Newberry, the manager of the premier teenage venue, Skylounge. With the Beatles captivating audiences in Australia and New Zealand, the band assumed a new musical identity driven toward a pop-orientated sound. They changed their name to the Rebels, and added a new vocalist named Larry Morris. Soon after, to accommodate to the group's current frontman, the band was advertised as Larry's Rebels.

As Larry's Rebels, the band asserted themselves as the resident group at the Top Twenty Club, replacing Ray Columbus and the Invaders, and sparking a long-lasting rivalry between the emerging bands. Though Larry's Rebels obtained valuable experience in the club, Williams recalls the restrictions and guidelines they faced, saying, "You were allowed a two songs-on-the-jukebox break. And you had to play five or six brand new songs that were in the Top Twenty that week or you were fined. If you were five minutes late you were fined. The songs all had to be danceable. You couldn’t do any slow ones". In late 1964, the band rounded out their most recognizable lineup when Viv McCarthy was brought in as a long-term bass player. After a year-long residency at the Top Twenty, the band shifted to the Platterack, which allowed them to experiment with a wider variety of compositions and musical genres.

In late 1965, the group shared top billing with Ray Columbus and the Invaders at the Miss Auckland Personality Contest. Impressed by the performance, Russell Clark, the manager of Ray Columbus and the Invaders, agreed to oversee Larry's Rebels, and he soon finalized a deal with Philips Records. With Russell, the band recorded demos for their debut single, many of which were rejected by the record company. Finally the group released their first single in December 1965 after settling with a cover version of Dionne Warwick's "This Empty Place". Though they did not manage to chart, the single sold well enough to encourage a second recording, with the folk piece "Long Ago, Far Away" being distributed in early 1966 to local success.

=== Further recording and success ===
In mid-1966, Clark collaborated with entrepreneur Benny Levin to establish their own label, Impact Records with Larry's Rebels being their first marketed artist. The band's first release did not dent the charts, but a cover of The Who song "It's Not True" peaked in the top 10 in September 1966. At year's end, the group followed up the single with a successful Impact Records Christmas tour, and, in January 1967, performing as a support act to The Yardbirds, The Walker Brothers, and Roy Orbison. A profound influence on Larry's Rebels, The Yardbirds encouraged the group to experiment with their instrumentals, and introduced them to psychedelic music. Larry's Rebels' captured what they learned in their fifth single, "I Feel Good", which climbed to the top five in New Zealand.

After a string of concerts in Australia in April 1967, promoter Ron Blackmore, head of the largest booking agency in Melbourne, closed a deal with the group to take part in The Easybeats high-profile homecoming tour. A follow-up to the band's successful single, a rendition of The Creation's "Painter Man", was released in April 1967, and raced up the charts before unexpectedly stalling at number six. The single's sales were impeded when a disgruntled listener complained about the inclusion of the term, "shit-cans". The phrase was miscued after Morris overdubbed "tin can" twice to emphasize the wording. Consequently, radio host Pete Sinclair banned the song from further airplay. It appeared the setback had little impact on the group's popularity when, in May 1967, their debut album A Study in Black was released, and a single, "Let's Think of Something", earned Larry's Rebels their first number one hit in Auckland and reached number four nationally.

On the band's return to Auckland, Clark arranged a publicity stunt in which Morris rescued a Miss New Zealand contestant from a fall overboard from a cruise. The act was later admitted to be fake, but attention was drawn to the group's psychedelic light show - the first of its kind in New Zealand. The band revealed the show when they went back on tour in August 1967, playing in the Golden Disc Spectacular. Afterwards, Larry's Rebels spent the rest of 1967 and most of 1968 in Australia, performing in larger venues as the featured attraction. The band was exposed to the drug scene while touring, particularly Morris, who would be late for concerts as a result. An original composition by Morris and Williams, "Dreamtime", was released in November 1967, and garnered another hit when it charted at number four. The group continued to incorporate psychedelic influences into their music, which ended with an ill-fated single, "Fantasy". Despite the setback, the group restored their position in the charts with the song, "Halloween", placing at number six in July 1968. However, the stress of another tour caused Rouse to suffer a nervous breakdown and leave Larry's Rebels. Their next recording, the Top Ten hit "Do What You Gotta Do", featured Mal Logan as his replacement, and included Brian Henderson on organ.

In early 1969, Morris, disillusioned by management, initiated a solo career. The last recording to include Morris was a take on Paul Revere and the Raiders' composition, "Mo'reen", which was released in February 1969 and charted at number four. He was replaced by the R&B singer Glyn Mason and the group changed its name to The Rebels. With Mason fronting the band, they achieved a surprising number one hit when it was thought the group was on the verge of breaking up with "My Son John" in March 1969. However, after permanently moving to Australia later in the month, the band failed to replicate their success. Their second album Madrigal was considered uneven and a single flopped in January 1970, which caused the group to disband.

Larry Morris died at his home in Auckland on 18 January 2023 after a short illness.

== Discography ==
=== Studio albums ===
List of studio albums
Title	Details
A Study in Black	Released: May 1967; Label: Impact (IMP-104); Format: LP
Madrigal (as The Rebels)	Released: 1969; Label: Impact (IMPS-107); Format: LP

=== Charting singles ===
List of singles, with Australian chart positions
Year	Title	Peak chart positions	
Year	Title	AUS	NZ
1967	"Dream Time"	85	4
	"Painter Man"	-	6
	"Let's Think of Something"	-	4
	"Dream Time"	-	4
1968	"Everybody's Girl"	98	6
	"Do What You Gotta Do"	-	6
1969	"Mo'reen"	-	11

== Awards ==
=== Aotearoa Music Awards ===
The Aotearoa Music Awards (previously known as New Zealand Music Awards (NZMA)) are an annual awards night celebrating excellence in New Zealand music and have been presented annually since 1965.

Year	Nominee / work	Award	Result	Ref.
2020	Larry's Rebels	New Zealand Music Hall of Fame	inductee	
