= Mr. Lee Grant =

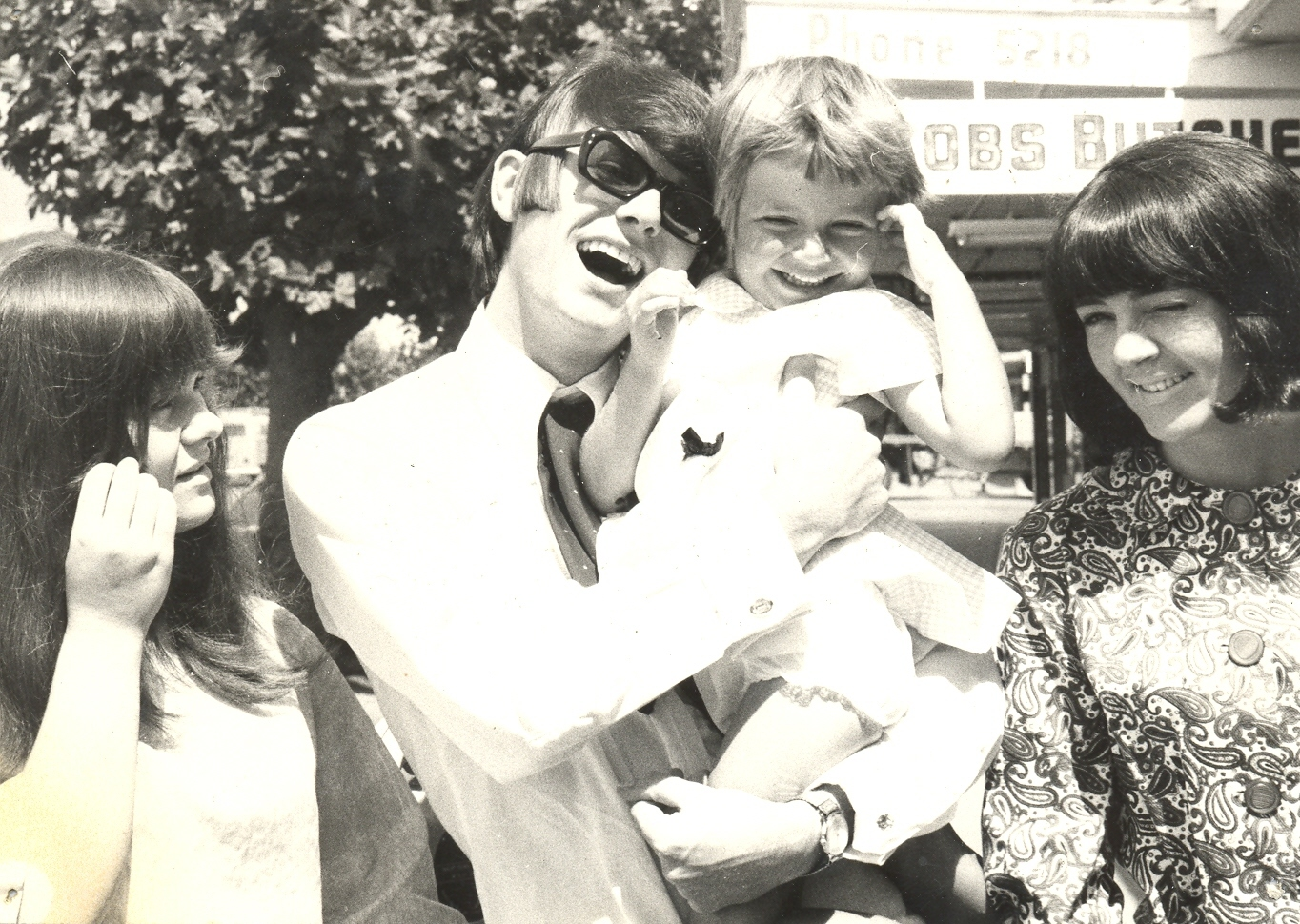
- Mr. Lee Grant

Background information
- Born: Bogdan Kominowski; 22 April 1945 (age 81)
- Origin: Polish
- Genre: Pop
- Occupations: Singer, Actor
- Instrument: Vocals
- Years active: 1964–present

Bogdan Kominowski (born 22 April 1945) is a New Zealand singer and actor. He is also known by his stage name, Mr. Lee Grant. He has had a successful singing and acting career, having starred in stage shows such as Jesus Christ Superstar and Elvis, television shows, and the James Bond movie A View to a Kill.

== Early life ==
Bogdan Kominowski was born in a Nazi German concentration camp just outside of Düsseldorf, to Polish parents. His father died in the camp, but he and his mother survived and in 1949, emigrated to New Zealand where they settled in Palmerston North.

Kominowski left school in 1963 and enrolled at Palmerston North Teachers College, after which he taught at West End School. While there he displayed considerable talent not only as a musician and singer, but also an artist. One particular teacher (Mrs. M. Foster) was so delighted with the friezes he drew around the top of her blackboard that she made a considerable effort to retain them even after he left teaching. He was well-liked by all his pupils and fellow teachers.

Kominowski's first interest in music came when he joined a local band called The Cyclones.

A friend of Kominowski's knew DJ Keith Richardson, who ran youth dances in the Hawkes Bay area, and he managed to get him some gigs there. According to Richardson's autobiography Never a Dull Moment, Richardson decided that Bogdan Kominowski was a bit of a handful. However, it was Sylvia Richardson, Richardson's wife, who came up with a new name, Lee Grant. The Mr was added to avoid confusion with an Auckland actress Lee Grant (there is also an American actress of that name).

Mr. Lee Grant's first recording was "Doo-Doodle-Do-Doo"/"As Long As I Have You" on Viscount in 1965. To promote the record, he travelled to Auckland for an appearance on Teen Scene. It was while doing that show, he met reporter, Dianne Cadwallader. She decided to become his manager and groomed the 21-year-old as a presentable soloist. Cadwallander secured guest spots at Teenarama in Wellington and a recording contract with HMV. She had him dressed by a Wellington fashion mogul and he quickly became New Zealand's Mr. Mod. After two unsuccessful singles, Cadwallander managed to get him a spot on the hit New Zealand music show, C'Mon.

== Music career ==
=== C'mon ===
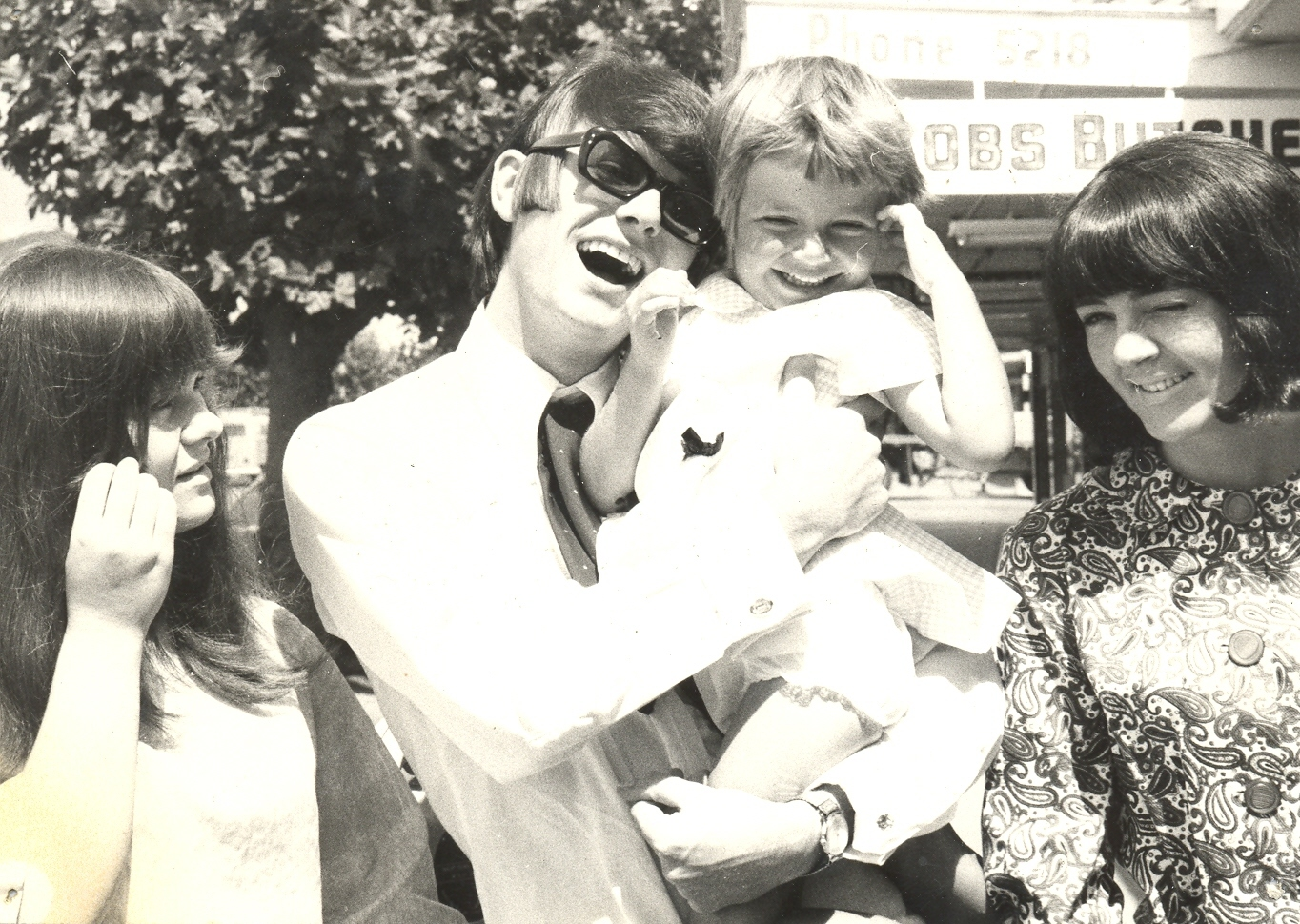
Mr Lee Grant meets a fan in 1968

The producer, Kevin Moore, was impressed and contracted Mr. Lee Grant as resident vocalist on C'Mon. During 1966–67 he went on three brief tours around New Zealand as a support artist to the Sandy Edmonds, Roy Orbison, The Walker Brothers and The Yardbirds package. This gave him quite a high level of exposure by the time C'Mon kicked off in February 1967.

Towards the end of the first C'Mon series HMV released the single "Opportunity", which entered the National Charts at number 17. By the time Mr. Lee Grant had completed The Animals and Dave Dee, Dozy, Beaky, Mick & Tich's tour five weeks later, "Opportunity" was at number one on the charts in May 1967.

His next single "Thanks To You" was released in September 1967 just prior to the "Golden Disc Spectacular". "Thanks To You" also made it to number one on the National Charts and collected the 1967 Loxene Golden Disc award. Mr. Lee Grant also picked up the NEBOA Award for "Entertainer of the Year"

A new single "Movin' Away" in December 1967 stalled at the number two position. Then with a failure for the next – "Ave Maria" – not even making the charts, he was rescued by the follow-up single "Why Or Where Or When", which had him back at number one in March 1968, just as Mr. Lee Grant was preparing to leave for Britain.

=== London ===
On 3 March 1968, Mr. Lee Grant, New Zealand’s biggest male star since Johnny Devlin, flew out of Auckland bound for London. In his absence, he scored two more Top 10 hits in New Zealand. In June 1968 "Rivers Run Dry" reached number 5 and "Bless You" reached number 6 in August.

Being away from his Australian fans, Mr. Lee Grant's popularity soon plummeted, and his record sales came to a halt. He did release some singles in England, however, as Lee Grant, but none of them were successful.

== Resurgence through acting ==
Success as a pop star in England was never realised, so Kominowski turned to stage, TV and film under his birth name. He played roles in Jesus Christ Superstar, Elvis, and TV shows such as the revival of Oh Boy and Brushstrokes.

In 1993 Kominowski appeared in the title role of The Phantom in the Australia/New Zealand production of Ken Hill's 1976 Phantom of the Opera musical (best known as being the inspiration for Andrew Lloyd Webber's better-known version).

Along with Frankie Stevens who appeared in Diamonds Are Forever, Kominowski is one of two New Zealand singing stars to have appeared in a James Bond movie. He played the part of Klotkoff, a KGB agent in the 1985 film A View to a Kill.

== Discography ==
In 2001 EMI released a CD called The Very Best of Mr. Lee Grant.

=== Singles ===
Song title	Highest NZ Chart Position	Year
"Doo-Doodle-Do-Doo"	–	1965
"Mind How You Go"	–	1966
"Opportunity"	No. 1	1967
"Thanks To You"	No. 1	1967
"Movin' Away"	No. 2	1967
"'Ave Maria"	–	1968
"Why or Where or When"	No. 1	1968
"Rivers Run Dry"	No. 5	1968
"Bless You"	No. 6	1968
"A Little Love And Understanding"	–	1970
"What Am I Gonna Do"	–	1971
"Mechanical Man"	–	1972
"You Keep on Dancin'"	–	1972
"Come on Dance"	–	1974

=== Albums ===
Mr. Lee Grant (#1, 1967)

- "Havah Nagilah"
- "You Can Have Her"
- "The Real Thing"
- "Some Kinda Magic"
- "Coloured Lights"
- "Opportunity"
- "Yo Yo"
- "Take My Hand"
- "Love"
- "The Coalman"
- "Spicks and Specks"
- "Thanks To You"

Mr. Lee in London (#3, 1968)

- "Tabatha Twitchit"
- "To Make a Big Man Cry"
- "Stop! In the Name of Love"
- "Walkin' With My Angel"
- "Maria"
- "Why or Where or When"
- "You Don't Have to Say You Love Me"
- "Big Man"
- "The Wanderer"
- "Tossin' and Turnin'"
- "Do You Mind?"
- "Big Boots"

The Very Best of Mr. Lee Grant (2001)

- "Opportunity"
- "Tabatha Twitchet"
- "Spicks and Specks"
- "Thanks To You"
- "To Make A Big Man Cry"
- "Movin' Away"
- "Maria"
- "Why or Where or When"
- "Rivers Run Dry"
- "You Don't Have to Say You Love Me"
- "Bless You"
- "Take My Hand"
- "Some Kinda Magic"
- "Do You Mind?"
- "The Coalman"
- "Big Man"
- "Walkin' With My Angel"
- "Tossin' and Turnin'"
- "Havah Nagilah"
- "Big Boots"

== Partial filmography ==
Year	Title	Role	Notes
1980	Flash Gordon	Lieutenant of Ming's Air Force	Film
1981	To the Manor Born	2nd Surveyor	Episode: "Station Closing"
1982	Whoops Apocalypse	Arch Mullah Operator	Episode; "The Violent Hour"
1983	Reilly: Ace of Spies	Peters	3 episodes
1985	A View to a Kill	KGB Agent Klotkoff	Film
1986	Lytton's Diary	Tennis Coach	Episode: "Rules of Engagement"
1987	Sorry!	Sandy	Episode: "Dream Time"
1989	Confessional	Turkin	1 episode
1989	The Paradise Club	Elvis Look-Alike	Episode: "Bring On the Cavalry"
1990–1991	Brush Strokes	Marcello Morella	7 episodes
1990–1991	Brookside	Richard Watts	3 episodes
1995	The Ghostbusters of East Finchley	Psycho	1 episode
2004	The Bill	Nikolai Semanova	Episode: "Crocodile Tears"
2014	Jack Ryan: Shadow Recruit	Mr. Borovsky	Film
2014	Vera	Walter Kraszewski	Episode: "On Harbour Street"

== See also ==
- Johnny Devlin
