= Satellite Spies =

Satellite Spies was a New Zealand band formed in 1984 by Deane Sutherland and Mark Loveys. The group enjoyed some success with "Destiny in Motion" (1985) which charted at #14, and in the 1985 New Zealand Music Awards were voted Most Promising Group, with Loveys awarded Most Promising Male Vocalist. They supported Dire Straits during their 1986 tour of New Zealand.

Since a split in 1987, rights to the name have been disputed and at times there have been two bands calling themselves Satellite Spies. One of these, led by Deane Sutherland, had a 1994 hit with "It Must Be Love", which reached #9 in the New Zealand Top 40.

== Members ==
Graeme Scott was the drummer from 1991 to 1997, and from 2000 to 2001. During the late 1970s, he was a member of Gary Havoc & The Hurricanes.

== Discography ==
=== Albums ===
| Year | Title | Details | Peak chart positions |
| Year | Title | Details | NZ |
|---|---|---|---|
| 1985 | Destiny in Motion | Label: Reaction Records; Catalogue: REAL 025 | 42 |
| 1987 | Us Against the World | Recorded 1987; Released: 2011; Label: GTM Ltd | — |
"—" denotes a recording that did not chart or was not released in that territory.

=== Singles ===
| Year | Title | Peak chart positions | Album |
| Year | Title | NZ | Album |
Original line-up
| 1985 | "Destiny in Motion" | 14 | Destiny in Motion |
| 1985 | "Wish I'd Asked That Girl To Dance" | — | Destiny in Motion |
| 1985 | "Hold on to the Night" | — | Destiny in Motion |
| 1986 | "Machine" | — | Destiny in Motion |
| 1987 | "Living in a Minefield" | 44 | Us Against the World |
| 1987 | Private Detective | — | Us Against the World |
| 1987 | "Only Here for the Rock 'N' Roll" | — | Us Against the World |
| 1988 | "Gonna Have To Change" (with the Yandall Sisters) | — | Us Against the World |
Sutherland line-up
| 1994 | "It Must Be Love" | — | Non-album single |
| 1999 | "It Must Be Love" (remastered) | 9 | Non-album single |
"—" denotes a recording that did not chart or was not released in that territory.
