= The Simple Image =

The Simple Image was a New Zealand rock band that was popular in the 1960s. They achieved four top ten hits including a chart topper with the song, "Spinning, Spinning, Spinning".

The original members were Barry Leef on guitar and lead vocals, Ron (Cass) Gascoigne on bass guitar and vocals, Harry Leki on lead guitar and vocals, and Gordon Wylie on drums. There was a lineup change in the late 1960s bringing in Doug Smith on lead vocals and Bruce Walker on keyboards and vocals.

The band moved to Australia in July 1969. After a short stint at "Lucifers" nightclub, they took up residency at The Whiskey A Go Go in Kings Cross Sydney. The original drummer left and was replaced by Wayne Allen from Christchurch, NZ. Doug Smith was replaced by original lead Vocalist Barry Leef.

After 20 months, the band dissolved.

== Singles ==
- "Two Kinds of Lovers"/"Summer Wine" #11 [NZ] March 1968
- "Spinning Spinning Spinning"/"Shy Boy" #1 [NZ] July 1968
- "Little Bell That Cried"/"I Wanna Go To Heaven" #9 [NZ] October 1968
- "Hold Me Tight"/"Tomorrow Is Another Day" DNC [NZ] November 1968
- "Grooviest Girl in the World"/"Make Time Stand Still" #3 [NZ] May 1969
- "Ulla"/"Tomorrow Today" DNC [NZ] July 1969
- "Michael and His Slipper Tree"/"Mean So Much" #7 [NZ] September 1969
- "Goodbye Birds"/"Send Me No More Letters" DNC [NZ] 1971
