= Hogsnort Rupert =

New Zealand pop rock band

Hogsnort Rupert is a New Zealand pop rock band. Formed in 1968 as Hogsnort Rupert's Original Flagon Band, the name was shortened in 1970 after the second album. Hogsnort Rupert became one of the longest-running bands in New Zealand music history.

Hogsnort Rupert is known for its light, humorous brand of music. It produced several charting singles, including the number one Pretty Girl, which became its biggest-selling single in New Zealand for 1970.

== History ==
The two consistent band members had been; Alec Wishart (lead vocals, percussion) and Dave Luther (vocals, guitar, harmonica). Luther was also the composer of all their hit singles. The band's early manager was John MacGee.

During the Original Flagon Band period, the band members beside Wishart and Luther were Ian Terry (vocals, guitar), Frank Boardman (bass) whose idea the band was, and Billy Such (drums). However, the last three musicians left the band in 1970. Hogsnort Rupert then included Wishart, Luther and John Reilly (vocals, guitar).

Reilly left Hogsnort Rupert before its third album was released. That album was recorded by Wishart and Luther. Later Hogsnort Rupert musicians included; John Newton, Graham Brown, Neil Worboys, Kevin Findlater, Bernie Reber, Dean Ruscoe, and Graeme Luther.

In November 2010, Hogsnort Rupert celebrated its 40th anniversary with two live concerts in Napier. Boardman died in Sussex, England, on 6 October 2015. Wishart died on 22 January 2016 at age 76 from lung cancer.

== Discography ==
=== Albums ===
| Year | Album | Format | Label | Catalog # |
|---|---|---|---|---|
| 1969 | All Our Own Work! Attributed to: Hogsnort Rupert's Original Flagon Band | LP | His Master's Voice | CSDM 6306 |
| 1970 | Have A Hogsnort Rupert Summer; Attributed to: Hogsnort Rupert's Original Flagon Band | LP; LP | His Master's Voice; World Record Club | HSDM 1004; SLZ 8359 |
| 1971 | Ways of Making You Laugh | LP | His Master's Voice | HSDM 1016 |
| 1974 | A Portrait of Hogsnort Rupert; Compilation Album | LP | Axis | 2004 |
| 1982 | It's Hogsnort Rupert | LP; Cassette | Mardi Gras; Mardi Gras | MG 1 MG 1c |
| 1985 | Something Old, Something New; Compilation Album featuring 5 tracks by Hogsnort Rupert | LP; CD | Axis; EMI | 180; 4711092 |
| 1999 | Hypnotic | CD | Crocodile | CRO CD 291044 |
| 2001 | The Very Best of Hogsnort Rupert; Compilation Album | CD | EMI | 5344602 |
| 2006 | A Tribute to the Good Times | CD | Spitfire | SPCD-22004 |
| 2010 | A Touch of Hoggers (Celebrating 40 Years of Recording with Hogsnort Rupert); Compilation Album | CD | Mardi Gras | MG 6 |

=== Extended plays ===
| Year | EP | Format | Label | Catalog # |
|---|---|---|---|---|
| 1970 | Have A Hogsnort Rupert Summer (A-Side: Pretty Girl / Lonesome Traveller ~ B-Side: Gretel / Aubrey); Attributed to: Hogsnort Rupert's Original Flagon Band | EP 45 | His Master's Voice | PRO.01 |

=== Singles ===
| Year | Single : A-Side / B-Side | Format | Label | Catalog # | NZ Chart | Source Album (Both sides from same album except where indicated) |
|---|---|---|---|---|---|---|
| 1969 | When I Was Young / Maggie Maggie; Attributed to: Hogsnort Rupert's Original Flagon Band | 45 | His Master's Voice | HR.349 | | All Our Own Work! |
| 1969 | All Our Own Work / Photograph; Attributed to: Hogsnort Rupert's Original Flagon Band | 45 | His Master's Voice | HR.366 | | All Our Own Work! |
| 1970 | Gretel / Drink To Me Lads; Attributed to: Hogsnort Rupert's Original Flagon Band | 45 | His Master's Voice | HR.391 | #11 | Non-album Track / All Our Own Work! |
| 1970 | Pretty Girl / Your Tender Look; Attributed to: Hogsnort Rupert's Original Flagon Band | 45 | His Master's Voice | HR.399 | #1 | Have A Hogsnort Rupert Summer / Non-album Track |
| 1970 | Aubrey / Lonesome Traveler | 45 | His Master's Voice | HR.419 | #5 | Have A Hogsnort Rupert Summer / Non-album Track |
| 1971 | Aunty Alice (Brought Us This) / Something Old Something New | 45 | His Master's Voice | HR.426 | #8 | Have A Hogsnort Rupert Summer |
| 1971 | Little Bird / I'm Coming on Back To You | 45 | His Master's Voice | HR.436 | | Non-album Tracks |
| 1971 | Monday / Act Naturally | 45 | His Master's Voice | HR.442 | | Ways of Making You Laugh / Non-album Track |
| 1971 | Charlie Was A Good Man / Digging My Potatoes | 45 | His Master's Voice | HR.450 | | Ways of Making You Laugh |
| 1973 | Taking Wine With Lil / Have A Cuppa Tea; Attributed to: Alec Wishart with Jelly Roll Revival (*) | 45 | His Master's Voice | HR.494 | | Non-album Tracks |
| 1973 | Grandad's Piano / Champs Elysees; Attributed to: Alec Wishart with The Society Jazzmen (A-Side) (*); Attributed to: Alec Wishart with Jelly Roll Revival (B-Side) (*) | 45 | EMI | HR.505 | | Non-album Tracks |
| 1981 | Tokyo Rose / Hey Good Looking | 45 | Epic | ES 695 | | It's Hogsnort Rupert |
| 1982 | Don't Make Me / Little Ukulele | 45 | Epic | ES 732 | | It's Hogsnort Rupert |
| 1982 | Pretty Girl / Aunty Alice | 45 | Mardi Gras | MG 2 | | It's Hogsnort Rupert |
| 1983 | Life Begins at Forty / Diggin' My Potatoes; Attributed to: Dave and The Dynamos (*) | 45 | Mardi Gras | MG 3 | #1 | Non-album Tracks |
| 1984 | Can't Spell Rhythm / Can't Spell Rhythm (Party Mix); Attributed to: Dave and The Dynamos (*) | 45 | Mardi Gras | MG 4 | | Non-album Tracks |
| 1984 | Holiday Song / Don't Make Me; Attributed to: Dave and The Dynamos (*) | 45 | Mardi Gras | MG 5 | | Non-album Tracks |

- Note: This Discography also includes acts associated to Hogsnort Rupert primary members; Alec Wishart and Dave Luther. Those entries are indicated with (*)
