= Nature's Best =

Compilation album series

Nature's Best is a series of three compilation albums of popular New Zealand Music songs, first released in 2002. The albums featured the Top 100 New Zealand Songs of All Time as voted by members and guest judges of the Australasian Performing Right Association.

A box set of all three albums was released in November 2005.

== Background ==
The genesis of the idea was the 75th anniversary of the Australasian Performing Right Association (APRA) in New Zealand in 2001 and the selection of the top 100 New Zealand songs of the past 75 years. A list of over 900 candidate songs was prepared, and voting was open to APRA members and an invited academy.

The list of the top 100 songs was announced in stages in 2001, with the number one place going to the 1969 song "Nature" by Fourmyula.

Following the creation of the APRA Top 100 New Zealand song, a collaborative effort by representatives of major record companies and APRA – most notably Mike Chunn – took place to produce an album of the top 30 songs from this selection, titled Nature's Best, released in January 2002, and followed up with Nature's Best 2 in October 2002, and Nature's Best 3 in May 2003.

== Nature's Best ==
Nature's Best

Compilation album
- Released: 14 January 2002
- Length: 115:56
- Label: Sony Music New Zealand

Nature's Best: New Zealand's Top 30 Songs of All Time was released on 14 January 2002 on the Sony Music label. The album was named after its title track, the 1969 The Fourmyula song "Nature", which had been voted number one in APRA's list of Top 100 New Zealand Songs of All Time.

The album enjoyed great commercial success, going 8x platinum. The album sold over 100,000 copies in its first four months, and eventually sold over 150,000 copies by its twentieth anniversary.

The album spent 11 weeks at number one on the RIANZ Official Aotearoa Music Charts.

Nature's Best was re-released as part of a Nature's Best Box Set on 29 November 2005.

=== Track listing ===
Disc one
No.	Title	Writer(s)	Artist and year	Length
1.	"Nature"	Wayne Mason	The Fourmyula (1969)	2:53
2.	"Don't Dream It's Over"	Neil Finn	Crowded House (1986)	3:55
3.	"Loyal"	Dave Dobbyn	Dave Dobbyn (1988)	4:38
4.	"Counting the Beat"	Phil Judd; Mark Hough; Wayne Stevens	The Swingers (1981)	2:59
5.	"Six Months in a Leaky Boat"	Tim Finn	Split Enz (1982)	4:21
6.	"Sway"	Bic Runga	Bic Runga (1997)	4:24
7.	"Slice of Heaven"	Dobbyn	Dave Dobbyn and Herbs (1986)	4:38
8.	"Victoria"	Jordan Luck	The Dance Exponents (1982)	3:29
9.	"She Speeds"	Shayne Carter; Straitjacket Fits	Straitjacket Fits (1987)	4:10
10.	"April Sun in Cuba"	Paul Hewson; Marc Hunter	Dragon (1977)	3:29
11.	"I Got You"	N. Finn	Split Enz (1980)	3:30
12.	"Whaling"	Dobbyn; DD Smash	DD Smash (1984)	3:46
13.	"Not Given Lightly"	Chris Knox	Chris Knox (1989)	5:07
14.	"Pink Frost"	Martin Phillipps	The Chills (1984)	4:01
15.	"Jesus I Was Evil"	Darcy Clay	Darcy Clay (1997)	2:52

Disc two
No.	Title	Writer(s)	Artist and year	Length
1.	"Weather with You"	N. Finn; T. Finn	Crowded House (1991)	3:43
2.	"Blue Smoke"	Ruru Karaitiana	Pixie Williams and the Ruru Karaitiana Quartet (1949)	3:00
3.	"Dance All Around the World"	Corben Simpson; Geoff Murphy	Blerta (1972)	3:42
4.	"Lydia"	Julia Deans	Fur Patrol (2000)	4:16
5.	"Blue Lady"	Graham Brazier	Hello Sailor (1977)	4:05
6.	"Drive"	Runga	Bic Runga (1997)	3:00
7.	"Chains"	Che Ness; Darryl Thompson; Angus McNaughton; Kevin Rangihuna	DLT featuring Che Fu (1996)	3:36
8.	"Dominion Road"	Don McGlashan	The Mutton Birds (1992)	3:56
9.	"(Glad I'm) Not a Kennedy"	Shona Laing	Shona Laing (1987)	3:15
10.	"I Hope I Never"	T. Finn	Split Enz (1980)	4:34
11.	"Tears"	Fane Flaws; Arthur Baysting	The Crocodiles (1980)	3:59
12.	"Be Mine Tonight"	Dobbyn; Ian Morris	Th' Dudes (1979)	6:03
13.	"I See Red"	T. Finn	Split Enz (1979)	3:17
14.	"Beside You"	Dobbyn	Dave Dobbyn (1998)	3:43
15.	"Home Again"	Karl Kippenberger; Tom Larkin; Phil Knight; Jon Toogood	Shihad (1996)	3:35

== Nature's Best 2 ==
Nature's Best 2

Compilation album
- Released: 4 October 2002
- Length: 140:21
- Label: Sony Music New Zealand

Nature's Best 2: More of New Zealand's Top Songs of All-Time is a two-disc compilation album of 35 popular New Zealand music songs, first released on 4 October 2002.

The album featured songs numbered 31–65 on the APRA 75th Anniversary Top 100 New Zealand Songs of All Time.

The album spent four weeks at number one on the RIANZ Official Aotearoa Music Charts, and album sales were certified 4x platinum.

Nature's Best 2 was re-released as part of a Nature's Best Box Set on 29 November 2005.

=== Track listing ===
Disc one
No.	Title	Writer(s)	Artist and year	Length
1.	"Outlook for Thursday"	Dave Dobbyn; Lisle Kinney; Peter Warren; Rob Guy	DD Smash (1983)	4:05
2.	"Down in Splendour"	Andrew Brough	Straitjacket Fits (1990)	3:38
3.	"Better Be Home Soon"	Neil Finn	Crowded House (1988)	3:09
4.	"How Bizarre"	Alan Jansson; Pauly Fuemana	OMC (1995)	3:47
5.	"Language"	Dobbyn	Dave Dobbyn (1994)	3:29
6.	"Message to My Girl"	N. Finn	Split Enz (1983)	4:01
7.	"Poi E"	Dalvanius Prime; Ngoi Pēwhairangi	Pātea Māori Club (1983)	3:52
8.	"Stuff and Nonsense"	Tim Finn	Split Enz (1979)	4:19
9.	"Venus"	James Reid	The Feelers (1998)	4:51
10.	"System Virtue"	Emma Paki	Emma Paki (1993)	4:41
11.	"Fraction Too Much Friction"	T. Finn	Tim Finn (1983)	4:14
12.	"French Letter"	Toni Fonoti; Spencer Fusimalohi; Dilworth Karaka	Herbs (1982)	3:41
13.	"Maxine"	Sharon O'Neill	Sharon O'Neill (1983)	4:35
14.	"Out on the Street"	Alastair Riddell	Space Waltz (1974)	3:16
15.	"Slippin' Away"	Max Merritt	Max Merritt and the Meteors (1975)	5:28
16.	"Violent"	Boh Runga	Stellar* (1999)	3:30
17.	"Why Does Love Do This to Me?"	Jordan Luck	The Exponents (1992)	3:26
18.	"1905"	Shona Laing	Shona Laing (1972)	2:58

Disc two
No.	Title	Writer(s)	Artist and year	Length
1.	"Anchor Me"	Don McGlashan	The Mutton Birds (1994)	4:30
2.	"Bliss"	Dobbyn; Ian Morris	Th' Dudes (1980)	4:59
3.	"For Today"	Nick Sampson; Malcolm Black	Netherworld Dancing Toys (1984)	5:31
4.	"Screems From Da Old Plantation"	Bill Urale; Kas Futialo	King Kapisi (2000)	4:44
5.	"Cheryl Moana Marie"	John Rowles	John Rowles (1969)	3:02
6.	"Blue Day"	Murray Burns; Colin Bayley	Mi-Sex (1983)	4:15
7.	"Glorafilia"	Ben Campbell; Nathan King; Adrian Palmer	Zed (1999)	3:21
8.	"Good Morning Mr Rock 'N' Roll"	Tommy Adderley	Headband (1971)	2:46
9.	"History Never Repeats"	N. Finn	Split Enz (1981)	2:58
10.	"In the Neighbourhood"	Jansson; Hassanah Orogbu; Brenda Makaoeafi	Sisters Underground (1994)	3:35
11.	"Julia"	Geoff Chunn	Citizen Band (1978)	5:37
12.	"Pacifier"	Karl Kippenberger; Tom Larkin; Phil Knight; Jon Toogood	Shihad (1999)	4:03
13.	"Let's Think of Something"	Roger Skinner	Larry's Rebels (1967)	3:37
14.	"Bursting Through"	Bic Runga	Bic Runga (1996)	3:43
15.	"Liberty"	Greg Johnson	Greg Johnson (1997)	3:30
16.	"Sweet Disorder"	Paul Casserly; Mark Tierney; Anthony Ioasa	Strawpeople (1994)	4:11
17.	"Asian Paradise"	O'Neill	Sharon O'Neill (1980)	5:04

== Nature's Best 3 ==
Nature's Best 3

Compilation album
- Released: 12 May 2003
- Length: 138:31
- Label: Sony Music New Zealand

Nature's Best 3: Completing the Top 100 NZ Songs of All-Time is a two-disc compilation album of 35 popular New Zealand music songs, released on 12 May 2003.

The album featured the songs numbered 66-100 on the APRA 75th Anniversary Top 100 New Zealand Songs of All Time.

The album peaked at number five on the RIANZ Official Aotearoa Music Charts, and album sales were certified platinum.

Nature's Best 3 was re-released as part of a Nature's Best Box Set on 29 November 2005.

=== Track listing ===
Disc one
No.	Title	Writer(s)	Artist and year	Length
1.	"Don't Fight It Marsha, It's Bigger Than the Both of Us"	Don McGlashan	Blam Blam Blam (1981)	4:44
2.	"Gutter Black"	Dave McArtney	Hello Sailor (1977)	2:55
3.	"Long Ago"	Tama Lundon; Willie Hona	Herbs (1984)	4:20
4.	"There Is No Depression in New Zealand"	McGlashan; Richard von Sturmer	Blam Blam Blam (1981)	3:19
5.	"You Oughta Be in Love"	Dave Dobbyn	Dave Dobbyn featuring Ardijah (1986)	3:41
6.	"Andrew"	Andrew Bain; Julia Deans; Simon Braxton; Steven Wells	Fur Patrol (2000)	3:47
7.	"Billy Bold"	Graham Brazier	Graham Brazier (1981)	3:06
8.	"Distant Sun"	Neil Finn	Crowded House (1993)	3:50
9.	"Suddenly Strange"	Bic Runga	Bic Runga (1997)	4:16
10.	"Forever Tuesday Morning"	Gary Curtis; Andrew Fagan; Tim Wedde	The Mockers (1984)	3:43
11.	"Cruise Control"	Chris Matthews; Michael Lawry	Headless Chickens (1991)	4:33
12.	"Pressure Man"	James Reid; Matt Thomas; Hamish Gee	The Feelers (1998)	4:32
13.	"Private Universe"	N. Finn	Crowded House (1993)	5:37
14.	"Room That Echoes"	Neville Hall	Peking Man (1985)	3:48
15.	"Sensitive to a Smile"	Todd Casella; Dilworth Karaka; Charlie Tumahai	Herbs (1987)	4:30
16.	"E Ipo"	Tui Teka; Missy Teka; Ngoi Pēwhairangi	Prince Tui Teka (1982)	3:47
17.	"Andy"	McGlashan; Harry Sinclair	The Front Lawn (1987)	4:35

Disc two
No.	Title	Writer(s)	Artist and year	Length
1.	"Bitter"	Karl Kippenberger; Tom Larkin; Phil Knight; Jon Toogood	Shihad (1995)	4:12
2.	"Four Seasons in One Day"	N. Finn; Tim Finn	Crowded House (1991)	2:47
3.	"Heavenly Pop Hit"	Martin Phillipps	The Chills (1990)	3:28
4.	"Husband House"	Matthew Bannister	Sneaky Feelings (1985)	4:14
5.	"Jumping Out a Window"	Andrew Snoid; Paul Scott	Pop Mechanix (1981)	3:18
6.	"If I Were You"	Shayne Carter; John Collie; Straitjacket Fits	Straitjacket Fits (1993)	3:58
7.	"I'll Say Goodbye (Even Though I'm Blue)"	Jordan Luck	The Dance Exponents (1983)	2:49
8.	"Maybe"	Sharon O'Neill	Sharon O'Neill (1981)	3:30
9.	"One Day Ahead"	Sean Sturm; Luke Casey; Michael Scott; Grant Winterburn	Eye TV (2000)	6:48
10.	"Renegade Fighter"	Ben Campbell; Nathan King	Zed (2000)	3:22
11.	"Part of Me"	Boh Runga	Stellar* (1999)	4:00
12.	"Sierra Leone"	Andrew McLennan	Coconut Rough (1983)	3:38
13.	"Words"	O'Neill	Sharon O'Neill (1979)	3:15
14.	"Spellbound"	T. Finn; Phil Judd	Split Enz (1975)	4:35
15.	"Rust in My Car"	Geoff Chunn	Citizen Band (1979)	3:50
16.	"Mercy of Love"	Shona Laing	Shona Laing (1992)	3:38
17.	"Can't Get Enough"	Joseph Fisher; Karl Steven	Supergroove (1994)	3:20
18.	"Naked Flame"	Dobbyn	Dave Dobbyn (1994)	4:46

== Follow-ups ==
- DVD release, 2003, music videos to sixty of the songs from the three albums
- Limited edition box set of the three albums and the DVD, 2005 (Nature's Best Box Set)
- More Nature, 2006, a selection of notable New Zealand songs since 2001

== See also ==
- Australasian Performing Right Association
- Music of New Zealand
