= APRA Top 100 New Zealand Songs of All Time =

Selection of New Zealand songs

The APRA Top 100 New Zealand Songs of All Time is a selection of New Zealand songs as voted in 2001 by members of the Australasian Performing Right Association (APRA). The top 30 of this selection was used to create the Nature's Best CD and the rest of the list for follow-up compilations. A similar list was made in Australia of the top 30 Australian songs.

== Selection ==
The list was created to commemorate the 75th anniversary of the Australasian Performing Right Association (APRA) in New Zealand in 2001. Nine hundred candidate songs were chosen for APRA members to vote on. The top 30 songs were released on the Nature's Best CD.

== Commentary ==
Some artists feature prominently in the list. These include:

- Dave Dobbyn with the most songwriting credits (10) and second equal as an artist (6).
- Neil and Tim Finn, with the second- and third-place songwriting credits (9 and 8, respectively).
- Finn-related bands Split Enz and Crowded House, which have the two highest entries (8 and 6—tied with Dave Dobbyn).
- Don McGlashan with 5 songwriting credits over his work with Blam Blam Blam and The Mutton Birds.
- Singer-songwriters Bic Runga and Sharon O'Neil, who each have 4 songs in the list.
- Herbs, who feature 4 times on the list.

Music journalist Bruce Sergent notes that the list is highly skewed towards the 1980s and 90s to the detriment of earlier music, with notable omissions including Howard Morrison, Dinah Lee, and Ray Columbus & the Invaders.

Some songs may also be claimed as both New Zealand and Australian. A list compiled by APRA at the same time of top 30 Australian songs also included Crowded House's "Don't Dream It's Over" (at number 7).

Political songs on the list include commentary on the 1981 Springbok tour riots in Blam Blam Blam's "There Is No Depression in New Zealand", and nuclear testing in the French Pacific through Herbs' "French Letter" and DLT's "Chains".

== Top 100 list ==
The list of the top 100 is below.

Position	Song	Artist	Writer(s)	Year	Album	Included on DVD
1	"Nature"	Fourmyula	Wayne Mason	1969	1	
2	"Don't Dream It's Over"	Crowded House	Neil Finn	1986	1	
3	"Loyal"	Dave Dobbyn	Dave Dobbyn	1988	1	Yes
4	"Counting the Beat"	The Swingers	Phil Judd, Mark Hough, Wayne Stevens	1981	1	Yes
5	"Six Months in a Leaky Boat"	Split Enz	Tim Finn	1982	1	
6	"Sway"	Bic Runga	Bic Runga	1997	1	Yes
7	"Slice of Heaven"	Dave Dobbyn with Herbs	Dave Dobbyn	1986	1	Yes
8	"Victoria"	Dance Exponents	Jordan Luck	1982	1	Yes
9	"She Speeds"	Straitjacket Fits	Shayne Carter	1987	1	
10	"April Sun in Cuba"	Dragon	Paul Hewson, Marc Hunter	1977	1	Yes
11	"I Got You"	Split Enz	Neil Finn	1980	1	Yes
12	"Whaling"	DD Smash	Dave Dobbyn	1984	1	Yes
13	"Not Given Lightly"	Chris Knox	Chris Knox	1990	1	Yes
14	"Pink Frost"	The Chills	Martin Phillipps	1984	1	Yes
15	"Jesus I Was Evil"	Darcy Clay	Darcy Clay	1997	1	
16	"Weather with You"	Crowded House	Tim Finn and Neil Finn	1991	1	Yes
17	"Blue Smoke"	Pixie Williams and the Ruru Karaitiana Quartet	Ruru Karaitiana	1949	1	
18	"Dance All Around The World"	Blerta	Corben Simpson, Geoff Murphy	1972	1	
19	"Lydia"	Fur Patrol	Julia Deans	2000	1	Yes
20	"Blue Lady"	Hello Sailor	Graham Brazier	1977	1	Yes
21	"Drive"	Bic Runga	Bic Runga	1996	1	Yes
22	"Chains"	DLT featuring Che Fu	Che Ness, Darryl Thompson, Angus McNaughton, Kevin Rangihuna	1996	1	Yes
23	"Dominion Road"	The Mutton Birds	Don McGlashan	1992	1	
24	"Glad I'm Not A Kennedy"	Shona Laing	Shona Laing	1986	1	Yes
25	"I Hope I Never"	Split Enz	Tim Finn	1980	1	
26	"Tears"	The Crocodiles	Fane Flaws, Arthur Baysting	1980	1	Yes
27	"Be Mine Tonight"	Th' Dudes	Dave Dobbyn, Ian Morris	1978	1	Yes
28	"I See Red"	Split Enz	Tim Finn	1979	1	Yes
29	"Beside You"	Dave Dobbyn	Dave Dobbyn	1998	1	
30	"Home Again"	Shihad	Tom Larkin, Phil Knight, Jon Toogood	1997	1	Yes
31	"Outlook For Thursday"	DD Smash	Dave Dobbyn	1983	2	Yes
32	"Down in Splendour"	Straitjacket Fits	Andrew Brough	1990	2	
33	"Better Be Home Soon"	Crowded House	Neil Finn	1988	2	
34	"How Bizarre"	OMC	Alan Jansson, Pauly Fuemana	1995	2	Yes
35	"Language"	Dave Dobbyn	Dave Dobbyn	1994	2	Yes
36	"Message to My Girl"	Split Enz	Neil Finn	1984	2	Yes
37	"Poi E"	Pātea Māori Club	Dalvanius Prime, Ngoi Pēwhairangi	1984	2	
38	"Stuff and Nonsense"	Split Enz	Tim Finn	1979	2	
39	"Venus"	The Feelers	James Reid	1998	2	Yes
40	"System Virtue"	Emma Paki	Emma Paki	1996	2	
41	"Fraction Too Much Friction"	Tim Finn	Tim Finn	1983	2	Yes
42	"French Letter"	Herbs	Tony Fonoti, Spencer Fusimalohi, Dilworth Karaka	1995	2	Yes
43	"Maxine"	Sharon O'Neill	Sharon O'Neill	1983	2	Yes
44	"Out on the Street"	Space Waltz	Alastair Riddell	1974	2	
45	"Slippin' Away"	Max Merritt and the Meteors	Max Merritt	1976	2	
46	"Violent"	Stellar*	Boh Runga	1999	2	Yes
47	"Why Does Love Do This To Me"	The Exponents	Jordan Luck	1992	2	Yes
48	"1905"	Shona Laing	Shona Laing	1972	2	Yes
49	"Anchor Me"	The Mutton Birds	Don McGlashan	1994	2	
50	"Bliss"	Th' Dudes	Dave Dobbyn, Ian Morris	1979	2	Yes
51	"For Today"	Netherworld Dancing Toys	Nick Sampson, Malcolm Black	1984	2	Yes
52	"Screems From Tha Old Plantation"	King Kapisi	Bill Urale, Kas Futialo	2000	2	Yes
53	"Cheryl Moana Marie"	John Rowles	Nathan Kipner, John Rowles	1970	2	
54	"Blue Day"	Mi-Sex	Murray Burns, Colin Bayley	1985	2	Yes
55	"Glorafilia"	Zed	Ben Campbell, Nathan King, Adrian Palmer	1999	2	Yes
56	"Good Morning Mr Rock 'n' Roll"	Headband	Thomas Adderley	1971	2	
57	"History Never Repeats"	Split Enz	Neil Finn	1981	2	Yes
58	"In The Neighbourhood"	Sisters Underground	Alan Jansson, Hassanah Orogbu, Brenda Makaoeafi	1994	2	Yes
59	"Julia"	Citizen Band	Geoff Chunn	1978	2	
60	"Pacifier"	Shihad	Shihad	1999	2	Yes
61	"Let's Think of Something"	Larry's Rebels	Roger Skinner	1967	2	
62	"Bursting Through"	Bic Runga	Bic Runga	1997	2	Yes
63	"Liberty"	Greg Johnson	Greg Johnson	1997	2	Yes
64	"Sweet Disorder"	Strawpeople	Paul Casserly, Mark Tierney, Anthony Ioasa	1994	2	Yes
65	"Asian Paradise"	Sharon O'Neill	Sharon O'Neill	1979	2	
66	"Don't Fight It Marsha, It's Bigger Than Both of Us"	Blam Blam Blam	Don McGlashan	1981	3	
67	"Gutter Black"	Hello Sailor	Dave McArtney	1977	3	Yes
68	"Long Ago"	Herbs	Lundon, Hona	1984	3	Yes
69	"There Is No Depression in New Zealand"	Blam Blam Blam	Richard Von Sturmer, Don McGlashan	1981	3	
70	"You Oughta Be in Love"	Dave Dobbyn	Dave Dobbyn	1986	3	Yes
71	"Andrew"	Fur Patrol	Andrew Bain, Julia Deans, Simon Braxton, Steven Wells	2000	3	Yes
72	"Billy Bold"	Graham Brazier	Graham Brazier	1981	3	
73	"Distant Sun"	Crowded House	Neil Finn	1993	3	
74	"Suddenly Strange"	Bic Runga	Bic Runga	1997	3	Yes
75	"Forever Tuesday Morning"	The Mockers	Gary Curtis, Andrew Fagan, Tim Wedde	1984	3	Yes
76	"Cruise Control"	Headless Chickens	Chris Matthews, Michael Lawry	1991	3	Yes
77	"Pressure Man"	The Feelers	James Reid, Matt Thomas, Hamish Gee	1998	3	
78	"Private Universe"	Crowded House	Neil Finn	1994	3	
79	"Room That Echoes"	Peking Man	Neville Hall	1985	3	Yes
80	"Sensitive to a Smile"	Herbs	Dilworth, Karaka, Tumahai	1987	3	Yes
81	"E Ipo"	Prince Tui Teka	Ngoi Pēwhairangi, Missy, Prince Tui Teka	1982	3	
82	"Andy"	The Front Lawn	Harry Sinclair, Don McGlashan	1987	3	
83	"Bitter"	Shihad	Shihad	1995	3	
84	"Four Seasons in One Day"	Crowded House	Tim Finn and Neil Finn	1991	3	
85	"Heavenly Pop Hit"	The Chills	Martin Phillipps	1990	3	
86	"Husband House"	Sneaky Feelings	Matthew Bannister	1985	3	
87	"Jumping Out A Window"	Pop Mechanix	Paul Mason, Andrew McLennan, Chris Moore, Kevin Emmett, Paul Scott	1981	3	
88	"If I Were You"	Straitjacket Fits	Shayne Carter, John Collie	1993	3	
89	"I'll Say Goodbye (Even Tho I'm Blue)"	Dance Exponents	Jordan Luck	1983	3	Yes
90	"Maybe"	Sharon O'Neill	Sharon O'Neill	1981	3	Yes
91	"One Day Ahead"	Eye TV	Sean Sturm, Luke Casey, Michael Scott, Grant Winterburn	2000	3	Yes
92	"Renegade Fighter"	Zed	Ben Campbell, Nathan King	2000	3	Yes
93	"Part of Me"	Stellar*	Boh Runga	1999	3	Yes
94	"Sierra Leone"	Coconut Rough	Andrew McLennan	1983	3	Yes
95	"Words"	Sharon O'Neill	Sharon O'Neill	1979	3	Yes
96	"Spellbound"	Split Enz	Tim Finn, Phil Judd	1979	3	
97	"Rust in My Car"	Citizen Band	Geoff Chunn	1979	3	
98	"Mercy of Love"	Shona Laing	Shona Laing	1992	3	Yes
99	"Can't Get Enough"	Supergroove	Joseph Fisher, Karl Steven	1996	3	Yes
100	"Naked Flame"	Dave Dobbyn	Dave Dobbyn	1995	3	

== See also ==
- Nature's Best
- Nature's Best 2
- Nature's Best 3
- Nature's Best DVD
- APRA AMCOS
- APRA Top 30 Australian songs
