= Nature's Best DVD =

Video by Nature's Best series
- Released: 22 March 2004
- Label: Sony Music New Zealand

Nature's Best series chronology
Nature's Best 3	Nature's Best DVD	Nature's Best Box Set

The Nature's Best DVD is a DVD release of 60 music videos to songs from the three Nature's Best compilation albums.

== Track listing ==
1. Dave Dobbyn - "Loyal" (Dave Dobbyn, 1988)
2. The Swingers - "Counting the Beat" (Phil Judd/Mark Hough/Wayne Stevens, 1981)
3. Bic Runga - "Sway" (Bic Runga, 1997)
4. Dave Dobbyn with Herbs - "Slice of Heaven" (Dave Dobbyn, 1986)
5. Dance Exponents - "Victoria" (Jordan Luck, 1982)
6. Dragon - "April Sun In Cuba" (Paul Hewson/Marc Hunter, 1978)
7. Split Enz - "I Got You" (Neil Finn, 1980)
8. DD Smash - "Whaling" (Dave Dobbyn, 1984)
9. Chris Knox - "Not Given Lightly" (Chris Knox, 1990)
10. The Chills - "Pink Frost" (Martin Phillipps, 1984)
11. Crowded House - "Weather With You" (Tim Finn/Neil Finn, 1991)
12. Fur Patrol - "Lydia" (Julia Deans, 2000)
13. Hello Sailor - "Blue Lady" (Graham Brazier, 1977)
14. Bic Runga - "Drive" (Bic Runga, 1996)
15. DLT featuring Che Fu - "Chains" (Che Ness/Darryl Thompson/Angus McNaughton/Kevin Rangihuna, 1996)
16. Shona Laing - "(Glad I'm) Not A Kennedy"
17. The Crocodiles - "Tears" (Fane Flaws/Arthur Baysting, 1980)
18. Th' Dudes - "Be Mine Tonight" (Dave Dobbyn/Ian Morris, 1978)
19. Split Enz - "I See Red" (Tim Finn, 1979)
20. Shihad - "Home Again" (Karl Kippenberger/Tom Larkin/Phil Knight/Jon Toogood, 1997)
21. DD Smash - "Outlook For Thursday" (Dave Dobbyn/DD Smash, 1983)
22. OMC - "How Bizarre" (Alan Jansson/Pauly Fuemana, 1995)
23. Dave Dobbyn - "Language" (Dave Dobbyn, 1994)
24. Split Enz - "Message to My Girl" (Neil Finn, 1984)
25. The Feelers - "Venus" (James Reid, 1998)
26. Tim Finn - "Fraction Too Much Friction" (Tim Finn, 1983)
27. Herbs - "French Letter" (Tony Fonoti/Spencer Fusimalohi/Dilworth Karaka, 1995)
28. Sharon O'Neill - "Maxine" (Sharon O'Neill, 1983)
29. Stellar* - "Violent" (Boh Runga, 1999)
30. The Exponents - "Why Does Love Do This To Me?" (Jordan Luck, 1992)
31. Shona Laing - "1905" (Shona Laing, 1972)
32. Th' Dudes - "Bliss" (Dave Dobbyn/Ian Morris, 1979)
33. Netherworld Dancing Toys - "For Today" (Nick Sampson/Malcolm Black, 1984)
34. King Kapisi - "Screems From Tha Old Plantation" (Bill Urale/Kas Futialo, 2000)
35. Mi-Sex - "Blue Day" (Murray Burns/Colin Bayley, 1985)
36. Zed - "Glorafilia" (Ben Campbell/Nathan King/Adrian Palmer, 1999)
37. Split Enz - "History Never Repeats" (Neil Finn, 1981)
38. Sisters Underground - "In The Neighbourhood" (Alan Jansson/Hassanah Orogbu/Brenda Makaoeafi, 1994)
39. Shihad - "Pacifier" (Karl Kippenberger/Tom Larkin/Phil Knight/Jon Toogood, 1999)
40. Bic Runga - "Bursting Through" (Bic Runga, 1997)
41. Greg Johnson - "Liberty" (Greg Johnson, 1997)
42. Strawpeople - Sweet Disorder "Paul Casserly/Mark Tierney/Anthony Ioasa, 1994)
43. Hello Sailor - "Gutter Black"
44. Herbs - "Long Ago" (Lundon/Hona, 1984)
45. Dave Dobbyn - "You Oughta Be In Love" (Dave Dobbyn, 1986)
46. Fur Patrol - "Andrew"
47. Bic Runga - "Suddenly Strange" (Bic Runga, 1997)
48. The Mockers - "Forever Tuesday Morning" (Gary Curtis/Andrew Fagan/Tim Wedde, 1984)
49. Headless Chickens - "Cruise Control" (Chris Matthews/Michael Lawry, 1991)
50. Peking Man - "Room That Echoes" (Neville Hall, 1985)
51. Herbs - "Sensitive To A Smile" (Dilworth Karaka/Tumahai, 1987)
52. Dance Exponents - "I'll Say Goodbye (Even Tho I'm Blue)" (Jordan Luck, 1983)
53. Sharon O'Neill - "Maybe" (Sharon O'Neill, 1981)
54. Eye TV - "One Day Ahead" (Sean Sturm/Luke Casey/Michael Scott/Grant Winterburn, 2000)
55. Zed - "Renegade Fighter" (Ben Campbell/Nathan King, 2000)
56. Stellar* - "Part of Me" (Boh Runga, 1999)
57. Coconut Rough - "Sierra Leone" (Andrew McLennan, 1983)
58. Sharon O'Neill - "Words" (Sharon O'Neill, 1979)
59. Shona Laing - "Mercy of Love" (Shona Laing, 1992)
60. Supergroove - "Can't Get Enough" (Joseph Fisher/Karl Steven, 1996)

== Critical reception ==
Critics noted some notable omissions from the Top 30 such as the number one song "Nature", and all except one of the voted Crowded House songs.

== See also ==
- Top 100 New Zealand Songs of All Time
