= Nature's Best (disambiguation) =

Nature's Best is a series of compilation albums of the top New Zealand songs, beginning with 2002's Nature's Best 1.

Nature's Best may also refer to:

- Nature's Best 2, an October 2002 compilation album of the songs numbers 31-65 of the top 100 songs list
- Nature's Best 3, a 2003 compilation album of the songs numbers 66-100 of the top 100 songs list
- Nature's Best DVD, a 2004 compilation DVD of music videos to sixty songs from the Nature's Best albums
- Nature's Best Box Set, a 2005 limited-edition box set release of the above three albums and DVD
- More Nature, a 2006 compilation album of twenty notable New Zealand songs more recent than the APRA 75th anniversary list
- Nature's Best Photography, an American photography magazine
