= Citizen Band =

Citizen Band may refer to:

- Citizens band radio
- Citizen Band (music band)
- Citizen (band)
