= Out on the Street =

Single by Space Waltz

from the album Space Waltz
- A-side: "Out on the Street"
- B-side: "Angel"
- Released: 1974
- Recorded: 1974
- Genre: Pop, glam
- Length: 3:20
- Label: EMI
- Songwriter: Alastair Riddell
- Producer: Alan Galbraith

Space Waltz singles chronology
"Out on the Street"	""Fraulein Love""

"Out on the Street" is a 1974 single by New Zealand band Space Waltz. The song peaked at number one in the New Zealand singles chart in October 1974, becoming the first glam rock song to achieve this distinction. The Bowie-influenced song was largely responsible for Space Waltz winning the "Best New Artist" award at the following year's New Zealand RATA Music Awards.

== Background ==
Space Waltz was chosen as an entrant in the TVNZ talent series New Faces, and the single, written by lead vocalist Alastair Riddell was recorded as part of this. Space Waltz went on to reach the final of the series, but were unsuccessful. The single, however, had caught the public's attention, and raced to the top of the charts.

Riddell's David Bowie influence was clear, but the song was also largely influenced by the writer's interest in science fiction. It was also a nod to the colourful street-life of Auckland's Queen Street, and particularly the street's transsexual community.

== Awards ==
As part of APRA's 75th anniversary, its members chose New Zealand's 100 greatest songs of all time. "Out on the Street" was voted into 44th place.

== Track listing ==
1. "Out on the Street" (Riddell)
2. "Angel" (Riddell)

== Charts ==
Chart (1974)	Peak position
New Zealand (Recorded Music NZ)	1

== Bibliography ==
- Dix, J. (1988) Stranded in paradise: New Zealand rock'n'roll 1955–1988. Wellington: Paradise Publications. ISBN 0 473 00638 3
- Sweetman, S. (2012) On song: Stories behind New Zealand's pop classics. Auckland: Penguin New Zealand. ISBN 978 0 143 56816 2
