= West of Eden (film) =

2017 New Zealand romantic drama film

- Theatrical film poster
- Directed by: Alastair Riddell
- Written by: Vanessa Riddell
- Produced by: Vanessa Riddell; Marc Swadel
- Starring: Kieran Foster; Luke Thompson
- Cinematography: Dean Carruthers
- Edited by: Alastair Riddell
- Music by: Alastair Riddell
- Release date: March 9, 2017 (New Zealand)
- Running time: 118 minutes
- Country: New Zealand
- Language: English

West of Eden is a 2017 New Zealand romantic drama western film, directed by Alastair Riddell and written by his wife, Vanessa Riddell. The film stars Kieran Foster and Luke Thompson. It premiered in New Zealand in 2003.

== Synopsis ==
The affluent farmer's son is everything Billy desires. The farm is everything the head drover wants. A story of forbidden love, revenge and a family torn apart, inspired by true events.

== Cast ==
- Kieran Foster as Billy (younger)
  - Phil Adams as Billy (older)
- Luke Thompson as Tom
- Peter Hansen as Danny
- Vanessa Riddell as Eva
- Peter Ford as Frank
- Liam Fennell as Eddie
- Sarah James as Ruth
- Brighde Riddell as Tess
- Flynn Steward as Finn
- James Wells as Rob
- Rob Kipa-Williams as Joe Williams
- Adam Coleman as Nathan Williams
- Abigail Coleman as Aroha Williams

== Reception ==
James Croot of Stuff rated it 3/5 stars, yet despite that decried: "This Kiwi period drama suffers from sometimes sweeping soap-esque plotting, uneven performances and an over-strident score." Shaun Brinsdon of Critic Te Ārohi gave it 3.5/5 stars and lauded the film for its progressive storytelling: "A low-budget New Zealand film can sometimes spell disaster, but [it] engages the audience through its controversial and unique subject matter."
