= Oxygen of Love =

Studio album by Emma Paki
- Released: 6 September 1996
- Recorded: 1994-1996
- Genre: Adult contemporary
- Length: 49:50
- Label: Virgin
- Producers: Mark Hart; Neil Finn

Emma Paki chronology
Oxygen of Love (1996)	Trinity (2010)

Singles from Oxygen of Love
- 1. "System Virtue" Released: 1993; 2. "Greenstone" Released: 1994; 3. "Don't Give It Up" Released: 1996

Professional ratings
Review scores
Source	Rating
Allmusic	4/5 stars

Oxygen of Love is an album by New Zealand singer/songwriter Emma Paki released in 1996. Oxygen of Love, produced by Mark Hart of Crowded House and Supertramp, was released in 1996 and reached Gold status in New Zealand. The album gained Emma a second nomination for Best Female Vocalist and also Best Album in the Entertainer of the Year Awards in 1996, with her winning the Mana Maori Award. The single "System Virtue" won three awards at the 1993 New Zealand Music Awards - Best Songwriter, Most Promising Female Vocalist and Best Video, as well as Best Music Video at the 1996 TV Guide Television Awards. The video was also the most played New Zealand video of 1994. Her single "Greenstone", produced by Neil Finn, charted to #9 on the New Zealand charts and won her a nomination for Best Female Vocalist in the 1995 New Zealand Music Awards.

== Track listing ==
All tracks are written by Emma Paki except where noted.

No.	Title	Writer(s)	Length
1.	"You and I"		3:11
2.	"Smile Society"		3:29
3.	"I Spy"		4:20
4.	"Paradise"	Paki; Cadzow Cossar	4:06
5.	"Give It Your All"		5:17
6.	"Nothing Left to Lose"	Paki; Āwhina	3:52
7.	"Talk to an Angel"		3:23
8.	"System Virtue"		4:49
9.	"Dreams"		4:11
10.	"Don't Do It"		4:30
11.	"Greenstone"		4:42
12.	"Don't Give It Up"		4:00
Total length:			49:50

== Personnel ==
Personnel as listed in the album's liner notes are:

=== Musicians ===
- Emma Paki – lead vocals (all tracks), acoustic guitar (1, 4, 6, 7, 12), keyboards (1, 2, 8), backing vocals (2, 3, 5)
- Mark Hart – production (1-10, 12), arrangements (3, 7), drums (1), bass guitar (2–4, 8, 10), keyboards (1, 2, 4–7, 10, 12), electric guitar (1–3, 5, 6, 8), acoustic guitar (1–3, 9), backing vocals (2, 5, 8, 10), lap steel guitar (4), melodica (12)
- Miguel Fuentes – percussion (1, 2, 4, 8, 10, 11)
- Paddy Free – engineering (1–10, 12), drums (1), programming (4, 5, 8, 10)
- Angus Davidson – mixing (1–10, 12), drums (2), percussion (5, 10), backing vocals (5, 8), bass guitar (12)
- Wayne Bell – drums (3, 4, 8)
- Levi Thighakai – percussion (3)
- Jason Hall – backing vocals (4)
- Tony Lumsden – bass guitar (5, 6)
- Jay Foulkes – drums (5, 6)
- Helen Taber, Jeremy Sickling, Joanne Johnstone, Reuben De Lautour – strings (7)
- Kipa Royal – guitar (8, 11)
- Steve Small – keyboards (9)
- Edith Ridings – backing vocals (10)
- Max Stowers – bass guitar (10, 11)
- Milton Hohaia – flute (11)
- Neil Finn – production, lead guitar, acoustic guitar, backing vocals and Mellotron (11)

=== Production ===
- Nigel Horrocks – executive production
- Don Bartley – mastering

== Awards ==
Year	Nominee / work	Award	Result
1997	Oxygen of Love	1997 New Zealand Music Awards – Album of the Year	Nominated
1997	Oxygen of Love	1997 New Zealand Music Awards – Best Mana Maori Album	Won

== Weekly charts ==
Chart (1996)	Peak position
New Zealand Albums (RMNZ)	5
