= Nature (song) =

1969 single from The Fourmyula

Single by The Fourmyula

from the album Creation
- B-side: "Home" (English Version)
- Released: December 1969
- Recorded: November 1969
- Genre: Pop, folk
- Length: 2:53
- Label: His Master's Voice
- Songwriter: Wayne Mason
- Producer: Peter Dawkins

The Fourmyula singles chronology
| "I'll Song You A Song" (1969) | "Nature" (1969) | "Make Me Happy" (1970) |

"Nature" is a 1969 single by New Zealand band The Fourmyula. The song peaked at number one in the New Zealand singles chart in 1970, won the APRA Silver Scroll songwriting award the same year, and in 2001 was voted the top song in APRA New Zealand's Top 100 New Zealand Songs of All Time. "Nature" was notably covered in 1992 by New Zealand rock band The Mutton Birds.

== Background ==
"Nature" was written by 19-year-old Wayne Mason, the keyboard player of The Fourmyula. Mason describes the song was being written, "in an hour on the front porch of my mum's house, looking out on a beautiful day with trees and stuff. Bees were buzzing and my heart was fluttering."

The song was recorded in November 1969, along with other tracks that would make up the band's third album, Creation. When recording the folk-inspired song, the band used autoharp and improvised percussion by hitting a wooden organ lid, the sole of a shoe and a box of matches, rather than using a full drum kit. Peter Dawkins, the song's producer, suggested the song be used as the band's next single, however Mason did not believe it would be successful. The single was released in December 1969. While touring England in early 1970, the group learned that "Nature" was now a number one single in New Zealand, with sales of around 17,000.

The band never played the song live in the 1970s. As well as the live music amplification technology not suiting the acoustic instruments used in the song, The Fourmyula felt that New Zealand audiences were not ready to hear bands playing original music.

== Awards ==
In 1970, as the writer of "Nature", Wayne Mason was awarded the APRA Silver Scroll, the prestigious award for excellence in New Zealand songwriting. In 2001 the song was voted by New Zealand members of Australasian Performing Right Association as the best New Zealand song of the 20th century. The song also appeared on the associated compilation CD Nature's Best.

== Track listing ==
7"

- "Nature"
- "Home" (English version)

== Charts ==
| Chart (1970) | Peak position |
|---|---|
| New Zealand (Recorded Music NZ) | 1 |

== The Mutton Birds version ==
"Nature"
- 1994 Australian release

Single by The Mutton Birds

from the album The Mutton Birds
- B-side: "Dominion Road"
- Released: August 1992
- Recorded: Link Recording Studio, Ponsonby, Auckland
- Genre: Pop, rock
- Length: 3:39
- Label: Bag Records/Virgin
- Songwriter: Wayne Mason
- Producer: The Mutton Birds

In 1992, "Nature" was covered by New Zealand rock band The Mutton Birds. It was their second single and peaked at number four in the New Zealand singles chart. The song had a harder, more rock-focused sound than the original. The song won Single of the Year at the 1993 New Zealand music awards. The song featured backing vocals from Jan Hellriegel.

=== Awards ===
"Nature" won Single of the Year at the 1993 New Zealand music awards, with the music video nominated for Best Video. At the same awards, The Mutton Birds' debut self-titled album won Album of the Year, with The Mutton Birds also winning Best Group.

=== Music video ===
The music video was directed by Fane Flaws, and was the first of six videos he was to make with The Mutton Birds. As well as being nominated for Best Video at the 1993 New Zealand Music Awards, it also won Best Music Video at the 1993 New Zealand Film & Television Awards. and was voted number 38 in the New Zealand Film Archive's list of the top 100 New Zealand music videos.

=== Charts ===
Weekly charts

| Chart (1992) | Peak position |
|---|---|
| New Zealand (Recorded Music NZ) | 4 |

Year-end charts

| Chart (1992) | Position |
|---|---|
| New Zealand (Recorded Music NZ) | 48 |

=== Track listing ===
Cassette single (1992, New Zealand)

- "Nature" - 3:39
- "Dominion Road" - 3:55

CD (1994, Australia)

- "Nature "
- "A Thing Well Made" (live)
- "She's Like a City" (live)

== Other versions ==
In 1999 singer Margaret Urlich recorded a version of "Nature" for her album of covers of her favourite New Zealand pop songs, Second Nature.
