= Johnny Nicol =

Australian singer

- Birth name: George Roy Nicol
- Also known as: John Nicol
- Born: 16 November 1938 (age 86)
- Genres: swing jazz, jazz
- Occupation: Singer
- Instrument(s): Vocals and fender jazzmaster guitar
- Years active: 1957–present

Johnny Nicol is a jazz singer born in Ayr, Queensland.

Nicol began his career in 1958 as a member of The Maori Troubadours and recorded an album, A Little This, A Little That, with them. He then went on to perform in on the Gold Coast then in Italy, Las Vegas and throughout England, then on a cruise ship between New York and the Bahamas. Later he proved very popular in South-east Asia.

He returned to Australia in 1969, and in 1972 hosted an ABC Radio music show in which he introduced emerging talent Renee Geyer to a wider audience.

He featured in a band with Col Nolan called The Col Nolan Soul Syndicate, which released the Live at Jason's LP. Following that he released a solo album, Touch of Blue (Phonogram, 1975). Nicol has since released four more solo albums, two CDs and a DVD.

With Col Nolan he opened the Australian tours for such greats as Benny Goodman's last tour and also the Modern Jazz Quartet (MJQ). Johnny also performed on the American bases throughout Southeast Asia in the early-1970s.

Jazz legends Don Burrows and Bob Barnard both name Nicol as their favourite Australian jazz singer.

Johnny Nicol is still performing along the eastern seaboard of Australia. He is now based in the Cairns area.

Johnny Nicol is the father of Emily Nicol who played the role of baby Chloe in the Australian TV production of A Country Practice.

== Discography ==
=== Albums ===
Title	Album details	Peak chart positions
Title	Album details	AUS
Touch of Blue	Released: 1975; Label: Philips (6357 025)	-
Traces	Released: 1979; Label: Hunter (HUNT 1001)	-
I Remember (with Julian Lee)	Released: 1982; Label: Hunter (HUNT 1002)	-
Where the Love Is	Released: 1987; Label: Larrikin (LRJ 175)	-
Just the Way You Are	Released: 1999; Label: Walkabout, Larrikin (LRF513)	-

== Awards ==
=== Mo Awards ===
The Australian Entertainment Mo Awards (commonly known informally as the Mo Awards), were annual Australian entertainment industry awards. They recognise achievements in live entertainment in Australia from 1975 to 2016. Johnny Nicol won one award in that time.

Year	Nominee / work	Award	Result (wins only)
2015	Johnny Nicol	John Campbell Fellowship Award	Won
