= Room That Echoes =

Single by Peking Man

from the album Peking Man
- B-side: "Vision High"
- Released: 1985
- Genre: Pop, new wave
- Length: 3:53
- Label: CBS
- Songwriter(s): Neville Hall
- Producer(s): Bruce Lynch

Peking Man singles chronology
"Lift Your Head Up High" (1985)	"Room That Echoes" (1985)	"Good Luck To You" (1986)

"Room That Echoes" (also called "Room That Echoes (Round and Around)") is a 1985 single from New Zealand pop band Peking Man. It peaked at number one in the New Zealand singles chart. The song was included on Peking Man's self-titled album.

The song was written by band saxophone player Neville Hall and features lead vocals from Margaret Urlich, with Pat Urlich on backing vocals.

== Awards ==
"Room That Echoes" won Best Single at the 1986 New Zealand Music Awards, along with five other wins for Peking Man.

In 2001 the song was voted by New Zealand members of APRA as the 79th best New Zealand song of the 20th century. The song also appeared on the associated compilation CD Nature's Best 3, and the video was on the Nature's Best DVD.

== Music videos ==
Two music videos were made for "Room That Echoes". The first was directed by John Day and used computer-generated 3D graphics, with a silhouette of singer Margaret Urlich dancing. The second version is a live-action video, featuring the band performing the song in a room.

== Track listings ==
7"

1. "Room That Echoes"
2. "Vision High"

12"

1. "Room That Echoes" (Extended Mix)
2. "Vision High"

12"

1. "Room That Echoes" (Extended Mix)
2. "Lift Your Head Up High" (Extended Mix)
3. Vision High

12"

1. "Room That Echoes" (Extended Mix)
2. "Lift Your Head Up High" (Extended Mix)
3. "Room That Echoes" (7" Mix)

== Charts ==
Chart (1985–1986)	Peak position
New Zealand (Recorded Music NZ)	1

Chart (2022)	Peak position
New Zealand Hot Singles (RMNZ)	38
