= Swirly World In Perpetuity =

New Zealand sailboat

- Nation: New Zealand
- Designer(s): Gary Appleby
- Builder: Michael Brien
- Launched: 1972
- Owner(s): Michael Brien; Andrew Fagan
- Fate: Lost at sea 2022

Specifications
- Length: 5.21 m (17.1 ft)
- Beam: 1.74 m (5.7 ft)
- Draft: 1.2 m (3.9 ft)
- Mast height: 7.2 m (24 ft)
- Crew: 1

Swirly World In Perpetuity was a small sailboat used by Andrew Fagan to make a series of solo voyages.

The yacht was designed by Gary Appleby, a New Zealand apprentice boatbuilder, and was constructed by Michael Brien, who launched it in 1972. According to Fagan, Brien was "an all-rounder and used to be a cabinetmaker and [he] had made an immaculate job of [building] the boat."

The yacht's hull had a chine construction, made of plywood sheathed in Dynel. Measurements taken during a 2019 refit showed that it measured 5.21 m (17.1 ft) from stemhead to transom, with a 1.74 m (5.7 ft) beam and a 1.2 m (3.9 ft) draft. It was a sloop with a masthead rig, with the mast itself being 7.2 m (24 ft) tall. The yacht was originally equipped with a 5.15 kW (6.91 hp) Honda inboard motor; this was replaced with a 4.8 kW (6.4 hp) Lifan petrol engine, fitted with a centrifugal clutch.

Fagan purchased the vessel in 1985 and used it to make a series of solo long-distance voyages. These included sailing from Auckland to Raoul Island and back; Auckland to Wellington via the west coast of the North Island, and a double crossing of the Tasman Sea as part of the 1994 Solo Trans-Tasman Race. These voyages were written about in Fagan's book Swirly World: The Solo Voyages, published in 2003.

In 2007, Fagan completed a 3,000 km circumnavigation of New Zealand with the yacht, with the route taking in the subantarctic Auckland Islands. This voyage is detailed in Fagan's 2012 book Swirly World Sails South.

In January 2022, Fagan set out from Auckland to circumnavigate the globe non-stop via the great capes. The voyage was anticipated to take 14 months, but 2,600 km into the journey, when approximately halfway between Auckland and Cape Horn, the boat's skeg and then its rudder were lost. Fagan was rescued by a container vessel, with Swirly World then being abandoned.

== Bibliography ==
- Fagan, Andrew (2003). Swirly World: The Solo Voyages. Auckland, NZ: HarperCollins Publishers. ISBN 9781869504021.
- Fagan, Andrew (2012). Swirly World Sails South. Auckland, NZ: HarperCollins Publishers. ISBN 9781869509828.
- Fagan, Andrew (2024). Swirly World: Lost at Sea. Auckland, NZ: Swirly World Books. ISBN 9780473717780.
