= Peking Man (album) =

Studio album by Peking Man
- Released: July 1986
- Studio: The Boatshed (Auckland); Mandrill (Auckland)
- Label: CBS
- Producer: Bruce Lynch

Peking Man chronology
Animal Instincts (1983)	Peking Man (1986)

Singles from Peking Man
- 1. "Lift Your Head Up High" Released: 1985; 2. "Room That Echoes" Released: November 1985; 3. "Good Luck To You" Released: May 1986; 4. "Between The Lines" Released: 1986

Peking Man is the only studio album by New Zealand new wave band Peking Man. Released in early July 1986 by CBS Records International, the album, produced by Bruce Lynch, had numerous successes in New Zealand. These included 8 award wins at the 1986 New Zealand Music Awards and a peak of No. 6 on the country's charts. It remains the band's only studio album as vocalist Margaret Urlich left the group to begin a solo career mere months after its release.

== Background and development ==
In 1983, Peking Man released their first EP, the four-track Animal Instincts. At the time, the band consisted of drummer John Fearon, saxophonist Neville Hall, bassist Tim Calder, vocalist Pat Urlich, and guitarist Perry Marshall. The EP did not chart despite a feature in the popular music magazine Rip It Up. Percussionist Jay Foulkes and vocalist Margaret Urlich, sister of Pat Urlich, joined the band the following year. After the success of the new line-up's 1985 single "Lift Your Head Up High," work on Peking Man began.

The album was recorded within six months at both The Boatshed (the Bayswater home studio of producer Bruce Lynch) and Mandrill Studios in Parnell. With the exception of "Good Luck To You," "Lift Your Head Up High," and "Breathe A Sigh Of Relief," which were written by all members of the group, most Peking Man tracks were written either by a single band member or a pair; however, the vast majority of lyrics were penned by the Urlich siblings and Hall. In a 1986 interview with Shake! magazine, band member Perry Marshall explained that the band benefitted from this process, noting that "the [output] increased" and that "the songs [were] getting better."

== Singles ==
Four singles were released from Peking Man in 1985 and 1986, most of which did well on the New Zealand charts. The first, "Lift Your Head Up High," reached No. 21. The following two singles, "Room That Echoes" and "Good Luck To You," both managed to reach the top 10, peaking at No. 1 and No. 6 respectively. "Between The Lines" was the album's final single but, unlike the others, failed to chart. These four singles were paired with a number of B-sides that did not feature on the album:

- "Too Late For Love" and "Rest My Case" (Hall) — 12" release of "Lift Your Head Up High."
- "Side By Side" (Hall and M. Urlich) — remastered release of the same track.
- "Vision High" (Peking Man sans M. Urlich and Foulkes) — most releases of "Room That Echoes."
- "Coming Event" (Peking Man) — most releases of "Good Luck To You."
- "Get The Feeling" (Hall and M. Urlich) — 12" release of the same track.
- "Whirling The Circles" (Calder) — "Between The Lines."

== Awards and nominations ==
At the 1985 New Zealand Music Awards, "Lift Your Head Up High" was awarded Best Engineer (Graeme Myhre). It also earned nominations for Single of the Year and Best Producer (Myhre). Because of the single's popularity, Peking Man were nominated for Top Group and Margaret and Pat Urlich were nominated for Best Female Vocalist and Best Male Vocalist respectively; out of the three awards, only Margaret won hers.

The following years' ceremony, Peking Man was extremely successful at the Awards. It won all four awards it was nominated for; Album of the Year, Best Producer (Bruce Lynch), Best Engineer (Myhre), and Best Album Cover (Phil O'Reilly). The band members won another three as a result of the album's success; Top Group, Best Female Vocalist (Margaret Urlich), and Best Male Vocalist (Pat Urlich). "Room That Echoes" was also awarded Single of the Year.

== Track listing ==
No.	Title	Lyrics	Music	Length
1.	"Running in the Human Race"	Margaret Urlich; Neville Hall	M. Urlich; Hall	3:38
2.	"Room That Echoes"	Hall	Hall	3:53
3.	"Standing On Your Own Feet"	Pat Urlich; Perry Marshall	Marshall	5:23
4.	"Afraid of the Dark"	Hall	M. Urlich; Hall	5:18
5.	"Good Luck To You"	P. Urlich	M. Urlich; Hall; P. Urlich; Marshall; Jay Foulkes; John Fearon; Tim Calder	3:47
6.	"Lift Your Head Up High"	M. Urlich; P. Urlich	M. Urlich; Hall; P. Urlich; Marshall; Foulkes; Fearon; Calder	3:51
7.	"Time in Store"	P. Urlich; Calder	P. Urlich; Calder	3:54
8.	"Between The Lines"	M. Urlich	M. Urlich; Calder	4:19
9.	"Start at the Beginning"	M. Urlich	M. Urlich	4:28
10.	"Breathe A Sigh Of Relief"	P. Urlich	M. Urlich; Hall; P. Urlich; Marshall; Foulkes; Fearon; Calder	4:37
Total length:				43:13

Sources: Spotify and vinyl record liner notes.

== Personnel ==
- Margaret Urlich – vocals
- Pat Urlich – vocals
- Tim Calder – bass guitar
- John Fearon – drums
- Jay Foulkes – percussion
- Neville Hall – saxophones, flute
- Perry Marshall – guitar
- Bruce Lynch – production, keyboards
- Graeme Myhre – engineering, production
- George Chisholm – trumpet (track 1)
- Mark Russel – trumpet (track 6)
- Neville Grenfell – trumpet (track 7)
- David Woodbridge – trombone (track 6)
- Phil O'Reilly – art direction
- Denis Hitchcock – photography
- Regan Cameron – photography
- Rose Wallace – artwork

Source: Vinyl record liner notes.

== Charts ==
Chart (1996)	Peak position
New Zealand Albums (RMNZ)	6
