= Sisters Underground =

New Zealand hip hop and R&B duo

- Origin: Ōtara, New Zealand
- Genres: Hip hop, R&B
- Years active: 1990–1995, 2002
- Labels: Joy Records/Sony Music New Zealand
- Past members: Brenda Makamoeafi; Hassanah Iroegbu

Sisters Underground was a New Zealand hip hop and R&B duo best known for their 1994 single "In the Neighbourhood".

== Background ==
Group members Brenda Makamoeafi and Hassanah Iroegbu originally met aged 13, at Hillary College in Ōtara, South Auckland. Iroegbu was an immigrant from the US, of Nigerian, Arab and German heritage. By 1990 the pair were performing around Auckland as Sisters Underground. They were put in touch with music producer Alan Jansson, who recorded two tracks ("In The Neighbourhood" and "Ain't It True" with them for the upcoming compilation album Proud.

"In The Neighbourhood" was released as a single, along with a music video by Greg Semu. The song peaked at number 6 in the New Zealand singles chart, and charted for 12 weeks. In Australia, "In the Neighbourhood" peaked at number 62 on the ARIA singles chart, and spent 10 weeks in the top 100.

In 1995 the duo performed in all six locations in Australia and New Zealand for the Big Day Out music festival, with "In The Neighbourhood" reaching #2 on Australian radio station Triple J's charts.

They won Most Promising Group at the 1995 New Zealand Music Awards., Unbeknownst to the pair, they were offered an album deal with Sony Music Australia through their producer Alan Janson. In the meantime the duo migrated to America and the album was never recorded.

In 2001 the song was voted #58 in the APRA Top 100 New Zealand Songs of All Time list. The song was included on the Nature's Best 2 compilation CD released in 2002, and the music video was included on the Nature's Best DVD released in 2004.

In 2002 TV2 used "In The Neighbourhood" for its station promotions. Alan Jansson remixed the song, with Makamoeafi and Iroegbu reuniting to rerecord the vocals. This sparked a renewed interest in the song causing it to be playlisted on radio.

At the 2013 Silver Scroll Awards, the duo reunited to perform "In The Neighbourhood" as the closing number of the night.

Brenda Makamoeafi (now Brenda Pua) lives in Australia, and Hassanah Iroegbu lives in Florida.

== Discography ==
=== Singles ===
List of singles, with selected chart positions
Year	Title	Peak chart positions		Album
Year	Title	NZ	AUS	Album
1994	"In the Neighbourhood"	6	62	Non-album single
2003	"In the Neighbourhood" (2003 TV2 Mix)	—	—	Non-album single
"—" denotes a recording that did not chart or was not released in that territory.

=== Featured appearances ===
The group have appeared on many compilations over the years in New Zealand. The following is a list of these albums that have featured tracks by Sisters Underground.

- Proud (1994) Second Nature Records – In The Neighbourhood and It Ain't True
- In the Neighbourhood (1996) Warner Music – In The Neighbourhood
- Nature's Best 2 (2002) Sony Music – In The Neighbourhood
- Give It A Whirl: The Soundtrack from the Major Television Series (2003) Propeller Records – In The Neighbourhood
