= Greenstone (song) =

Single by Emma Paki

from the album Oxygen of Love
- B-side: "Free"; "Yair"
- Released: 1994
- Length: 4:42
- Label: Virgin
- Songwriter: Emma Paki
- Producer: Neil Finn

Emma Paki singles chronology
"System Virtue" (1993)	"Greenstone" (1994)	"Don't Give It Up" (1996)

"Greenstone" is a song by New Zealand singer-songwriter Emma Paki, released in 1994 through Virgin Records. Produced by Neil Finn of Split Enz and Crowded House, the track served as the second single from Paki's debut studio album, Oxygen of Love (1996). It reached the top ten of the New Zealand singles chart and remains her highest-charting single to date.

== Development and release ==
Paki's 1993 debut single under the Tangata Records label, the Jaz Coleman-produced "System Virtue," received critical acclaim and led her to multiple wins at the New Zealand Music Awards. However, she left the local label in the winter of 1994 after signing with management. Tangata partner Willie Jackson told Rip It Up in September of that year that the singer became unsatisfied with the $15,000 budget for her debut album.

"Greenstone," Paki's follow-up single to "System Virtue" and her first release under Virgin, would come to be produced by well-known New Zealand musician Neil Finn. The track features lyrics referencing the Māori custom of gifting pounamu (New Zealand greenstone) that are sung over stripped-back instrumentation. Its release was accompanied by a music video directed by Kerry Brown that stars Paki alongside New Zealand actor Cliff Curtis in the Auckland city centre, including on Karangahape Road, and the bush.

== Reception ==
Multiple critics were disapproving of the track upon its release. John Russell unfavourably reviewed it in the December 1994 issue of Rip It Up, describing it as "confusing" and its arrangement as "strange." In the October 1996 issue of the same publication, Greg Fleming referred to "Greenstone" in his review of Oxygen of Love as "weak" and an unnecessary addition to the album. The song nonetheless garnered two nominations at the 1995 New Zealand Music Awards — Best Producer (Finn) and Best Engineer (Nick Launay) — alongside a nomination for Paki for Best Female Vocalist. All three nominations were ultimately lost.

== Track listing ==
New Zealand cassette single

1. "Greenstone"
2. "Greenstone" (Cave mix)
3. "Free"
4. "Yair"

== Personnel ==
Credits adapted from the National Library of New Zealand.

- Emma Paki – lead vocals
- Neil Finn – backing vocals, candlesticks, guitar, Mellotron, production
- Miguel Fuentes – percussion
- Milton Hohaia – kōauau
- Nick Launay – engineering
- Kipa Royal – guitar
- Max Stowers – bass

== Charts ==
Chart (1994)	Peak position
New Zealand (Recorded Music NZ)	9
