= In the Neighbourhood =

- Original 1994 Single Cover

Single by Sisters Underground
- B-side: "In the Neighbourhood" (Pacifican Wave Mix)
- Released: 1994
- Genre: Hip hop, R&B
- Length: 3:33
- Label: Joy Records
- Songwriters: Brenda Makamoeafi, Hassanah Iroegbu, Alan Jansson
- Producer: Alan Jansson

"In the Neighbourhood" is the 1994 debut single by the New Zealand hip hop duo Sisters Underground. The song peaked at #6 in the New Zealand singles charts and is now regarded as a landmark single both in the emerging South Auckland music scene of the 1990s and for New Zealand music as a whole.

== Background ==
The lyrics were written by high school friends Brenda Makamoeafi and Hassanah Iroegbu. The duo had performed around Auckland as "Sisters Underground" before working with producer Alan Jansson, who recorded two Sisters Underground tracks for the Proud compilation album. Jansson produced instrumentation for the track - hip hop beats and acoustic guitars.

== Commercial performance ==
The single charted at number 6 on the New Zealand singles chart, charting for 12 weeks in the winter of 1994. The song was also released in Australia, where it peaked at number 62 and spent 10 weeks on the ARIA top 100 singles chart. The track received airplay on Australian youth radio network Triple J, and was voted number 81 on the Triple J Hottest 100, 1994. The song also reached the top 10 of the Italian dance chart.

2003 rerelease single artwork

== Reception ==
The song gained significant recognition across New Zealand. It was nominated for single of the year at the 1995 New Zealand Music Awards. While Sisters Underground won most promising group at the 1995 Awards, Iroegbu moved to America soon after and the duo did not release any further singles.

In 2001 the song was voted #58 in the APRA Top 100 New Zealand Songs of All Time list. The song was included on the Nature's Best 2 compilation CD released in 2002, and the music video was included on the Nature's Best DVD released in 2004.

In 2002, TV2 used the song for their station promotion. Alan Jansson was commissioned to remix it, with Makamoeafi and Iroegbu reuniting to re-record the vocals. The remixed version was released as a single and received radio airplay.

At the 2013 APRA Silver Scroll Awards, the duo reunited to perform the song as the closing number of the night.

== Music video ==
A music video was made for the song and directed by photographers Greg Semu and Kerry Brown. It was shot around the Māngere Bridge neighbourhood in South Auckland. It was nominated for best music video at the 1995 New Zealand Film and Television Awards.

== Track listings ==
CD single and 7" (1994)

1. "In the Neighbourhood" (Radio Version)
2. "In the Neighbourhood" (Pacifican Wave Mix)
3. "In the Neighbourhood" (Uptown Mix)
4. "In the Neighbourhood" (Pacifican Acoustic Mix)

CD single (2003)

1. "In the Neighbourhood" (2003 TV2 Mix)
2. "In the Neighbourhood" (Original Mix)
3. "In the Neighbourhood" (Alternative 2003 Remix)

== Charts ==
=== Weekly charts ===
Weekly chart performance for "In the Neighbourhood"
Chart (1994)	Peak position
Australia (ARIA)	62
New Zealand (Recorded Music NZ)	6

=== Year-end charts ===
Year-end chart performance for "In the Neighbourhood"
Chart (1994)	Position
New Zealand (Recorded Music NZ)	40
