= The Maori Troubadours =

The Maori Troubadours were a Māori-based showband which performed in Australia and Southeast Asia, beginning in 1958 and continuing well into the 1960s. The three original members were Prince Tui Latui (a.k.a. Tui Teka), Matt Tenana and Johnny Kealoah (real name Johnny Nicol). Drummer Neville Turner joined the band not long after its inception. They were a popular act, playing at Chequers and the Rex Hotel (Sydney), the Theatre Royal (Brisbane) as well as a host of centres on the Australian country show circuit. They also toured as support band with the Mickey Mouse Show and the Harlem Globetrotters.

Johnny Nicol became a solo performer, playing throughout the US and England in the late 1960s, and Southeast Asia in the 1970s. He is recognised as one of the finest jazz singer-guitarists in Australia. Originally from North Queensland he currently lives on the Gold Coast and is still performing regularly both solo and with various jazz/swing bands.
