= Counting the Beat =

Single by The Swingers

from the album Practical Jokers
- B-side: "One Good Reason"
- Released: 2 March 1981 (Australia)
- Recorded: August 1980
- Genre: New wave
- Label: Mushroom Records
- Songwriters: Buster Stiggs; Phil Judd; Bones Hillman
- Producer: David Tickle

The Swingers singles chronology
"One Good Reason" (1979)	"Counting the Beat" (1981)	"It Ain't What You Dance, It's the Way That You Dance It" (1981)

"Counting the Beat" is a song by New Zealand rock band the Swingers, released as a single in 1981 from their album Practical Jokers (released in the US as Counting the Beat).

== History ==
The single was performed by the Swingers; the group's frontman Phil Judd was previously a member of Split Enz. Although the band had several hit songs in New Zealand, "Counting the Beat" was their only major chart success in Australia, and they are considered a one-hit wonder in that country. The song is well known for its catchy beat and memorable music video.

There were long delays in the release of the song: while recorded in August 1980, the final mix was not ready until November, and the decision then made by Mushroom to not release the song until after Christmas. Between its recording and release, Buster Stiggs had left the band and joined Australian rock group Models.

On its eventual release in February, the song was an immediate hit, reaching #1 in Australia on 2 March 1981 and in New Zealand that May (where it spent 9 weeks in the top two). The song was the number one charting song of 1981 in Australia according to the Kent Music Report end of year chart. As of July 1997, it had sold over 100,000 copies in Australia.

== Music video ==
The song is known for its memorable music video as well as the song. The crowd at the end of the song were not actors but instead people on a 'surprise' drinking bus. One of the stops was the video shoot, where they had 15 minutes to dance.

== Track listing ==
1. "Counting the Beat"
2. "One Good Reason"

== Silver Scroll award ==
In September 2015, "Counting the Beat" was awarded a retrospective New Zealand Silver Scroll award, dubbed the 'lost Silver Scroll', because the awards were not held in 1981, for reasons that remain unclear.

== Charts ==
=== Weekly charts ===
Chart (1981)	Peak position
Australia (Kent Music Report)	1
New Zealand (RIANZ)	1
US (Mainstream Rock)	45

=== Year-end charts ===
Year-end chart performance for "Counting the Beat"
Chart (1981)	Position
Australia (Kent Music Report)	1
New Zealand (RIANZ)	3

== Popular culture ==
- From the early to mid-1990s until the early 2000s, the song was used as the theme for the New Zealand soft drink Lemon and Paeroa.
- From 1997 to 2002, the song was used in advertisements for Kmart Australia.
- In 2001, it was voted fourth-best New Zealand song of all time by members of APRA, and included on the related Nature's Best CD and DVD.
