= Space Waltz =

New Zealand glam rock band

- Origin: Auckland, New Zealand
- Genres: Glam rock; pop rock
- Years active: 1974–1975; 2023
- Labels: EMI
- Past members: Alastair Riddell; Eddie Rayner; Brent Eccles; Greg Clark; Peter Cuddihy; Mike Chunn (Note: Split Enz bassist Mike Chunn temporarily stood in when Peter Cuddihy was unavailable for a national tour. Chunn also featured in the band's second appearance on television's New Faces.)

Space Waltz are a New Zealand glam rock band formed in 1974 by frontman Alastair Riddell. In 1974, they had a number-one hit in New Zealand with "Out on the Street".

== Career ==
In 1974, Alastair Riddell (vocals/guitar), Greg Clark (guitar), Eddie Rayner (keyboards), Peter Cuddihy (bass), and Brent Eccles (drums) had been performing as a covers band named Stewart and the Belmonts. Seeking to record Riddell's original compositions, they entered the television talent quest New Faces under the name Space Waltz. In the qualifying round they performed "Out on the Street"; in the finals, "Beautiful Boy", creating a stir with Riddell's "androgynous" image (influenced by David Bowie's Ziggy Stardust). Although Space Waltz did not win the final, they attracted attention from rock fans and were promptly signed up by EMI Records, who released "Out on the Street" as a single. The song reached number 1 on the New Zealand charts.

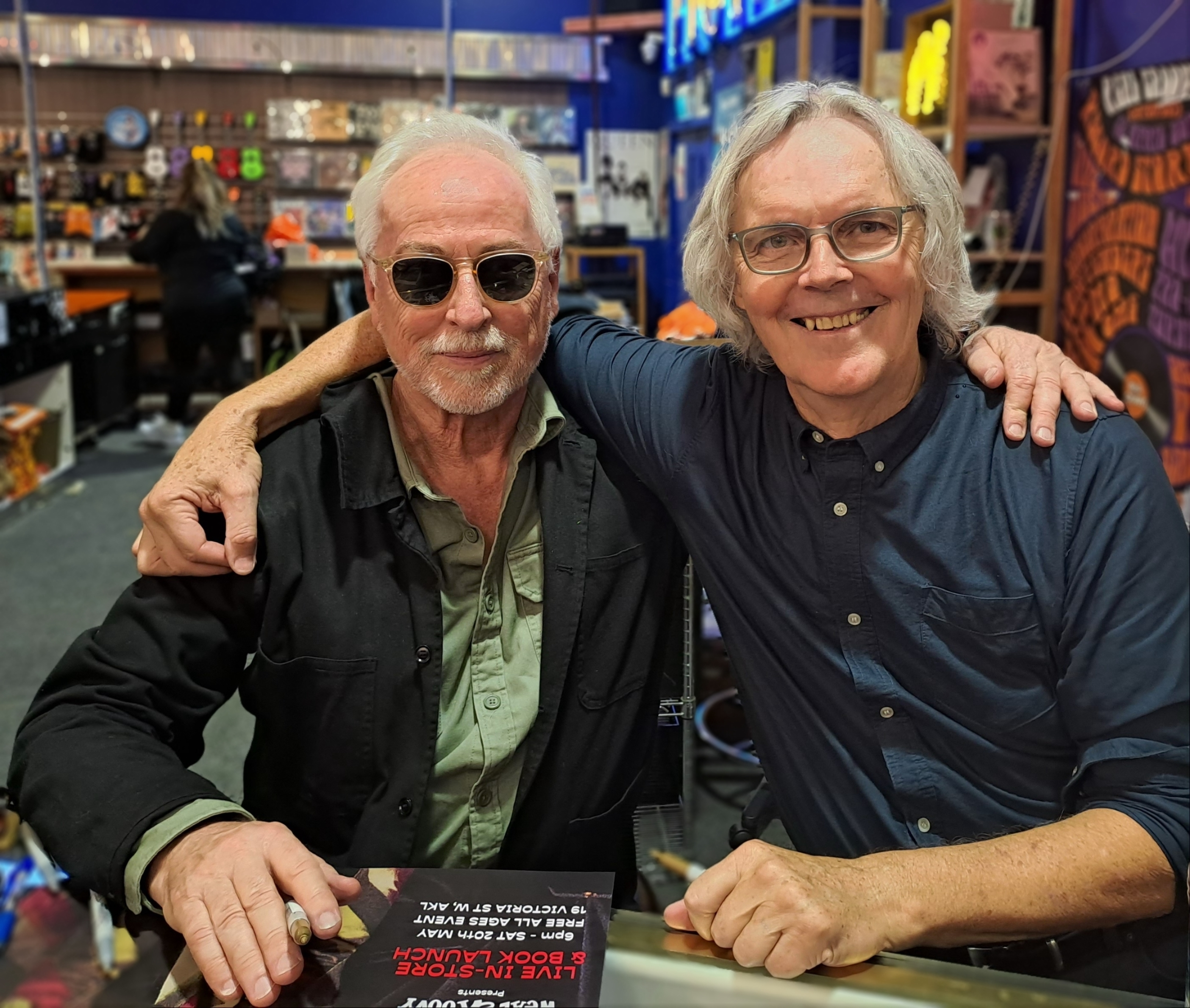
Eddie Rayner (left) and Alastair Riddell in 2023.

In 1975 the band's debut album was released, entitled Space Waltz by Alastair Riddell, creating some confusion among the public as to whether Space Waltz was a group or a Riddell solo project. The album, which featured backing vocals by The Yandall Sisters, made the New Zealand Top 20, with the second single, "Fraulein Love", reaching the Top 30. (Note: Chapman (2023) states the album and "Fraulein Love" peaked at number 14 and 20, respectively, while other sources give chart positions of 15 and 27. New Zealand had established a new music chart system in April 1975, which may account for the differing figures.) Space Waltz won Best New Artist at the 1975 Recording Arts Talent Awards.

The group subsequently flew to Australia but were unable to finalise a record deal there, and disbanded shortly afterwards. Riddell pursued a solo career, Rayner joined Split Enz, and Clark and Eccles joined Citizen Band.

In 2023, the band reunited for the release of a second album, Victory, which featured a blend of new songs together with re-recordings of selected tracks from their first album.

== Discography ==
Singles
Title	Year
"Out on the Street" / "Angel"	1974
"Fraulein Love" / "Scars Of Love"	1975

Albums
Title	Year	Notes
Space Waltz by Alastair Riddell	1975	Reissued on CD in 2002 and 2023.
Victory	2023	
