= Whispering Afraid =

Studio album by Shona Laing
- Released: 1973
- Studio: EMI, Wellington, New Zealand
- Genre: Folk rock, pop
- Label: Vertigo
- Producer: Dale Wrightson

Shona Laing chronology
Whispering Afraid (1973)	Shooting Stars Are Only Seen At Night (1974)

Singles from Whispering Afraid
- 1. "1905" Released: February 1973; 2. "Show Your Love" Released: 1973; 3. "Masquerade" Released: 1973

Whispering Afraid is the 1973 debut album by New Zealand singer-songwriter Shona Laing. Recorded at Wellington's EMI Studios and produced by New Zealand musician Dale Wrightson, Whispering Afraid was released by Vertigo Records after the teenage Laing's popularity on the talent show New Faces. The album, consisting of folk rock and pop songs, was commercially successful and was certified gold in New Zealand. Following its release, Laing was awarded Best Newcomer, Best Female Vocalist, and Best Performer of the Year at the 1973 Recording Arts Talent Awards.

== Title and artwork ==
The album title comes from the fourth track on the album, "Whispering Afraid". This song was never released as a single.

The album cover, designed by Wrightson and photographed by Sal Criscillo, features Laing standing in the doorway of a cottage located in the Wairarapa area; however, she and the doorway were photographed at Criscillo's Wellington home and then edited on.

== Singles ==
Three singles were released which were well-received. The lead single "1905" (written about Henry Fonda) remained on the charts for 14 weeks, was certified gold in New Zealand, and reached No. 4 on the New Zealand charts. The second single, "Show Your Love", reached the same position while the final single, "Masquerade", reached No. 11.

== Track listing ==
All tracks are written by Shona Laing

Original 1973 release
No.	Title	Length
1.	"1905"	3:21
2.	"Lady Dipton"	2:22
3.	"You Are The One"	3:26
4.	"Whispering Afraid"	4:06
5.	"Quiet Night"	4:03
6.	"Show Your Love"	3:27
7.	"If Only"	3:29
8.	"Like Days Gone Before"	2:55
9.	"Is Anything Ever Everlasting"	4:50
10.	"Masquerade"	5:23

Digital reissue
No.	Title	Length
11.	"I Love My Feet"	2:34
