= South (Shona Laing album) =

Studio album by Shona Laing
- Released: 1987/1988
- Recorded: Mandrill Studios, Auckland, New Zealand/Studios 301, Sydney, Australia
- Genre: Pop rock, new wave, synthpop
- Label: TVT Records, Virgin Records, Pagan Records
- Producer: Shona Laing/Stephen McCurdy/Graeme Myhre/Bruce Lynch

Shona Laing chronology
Genre (1985)	South (1987)	1905-1990 A Retrospective (1991)

Singles from South
- 1. "(Glad I'm) Not a Kennedy" Released: 1987; 2. "Drive Baby Drive" Released: 1987; 3. "Soviet Snow" Released: 1987; 4. "Caught (Between the Devil and the Deep Blue Sea)" Released: 1987

Professional ratings
Review scores
Source	Rating
AllMusic	3/5 stars
Rolling Stone	4/5 stars

South is a 1987/1988 album by New Zealand musician Shona Laing and her most commercially successful release to date. It was released twice; in 1987 as a worldwide release, and again in 1988 in the United States. Laing reprised four of the tracks from her 1985 album Genre ("(Glad I'm) Not a Kennedy", "The Migrant and Refugee", "Neat and Tidy" and "Day Trip" retitled as "Your Reputation") for the U.S. release of South (only "Kennedy" was included on the international release).

Three singles from the album reached the charts in New Zealand, Australia, and the U.S.; "(Glad I'm) Not a Kennedy", "Drive Baby Drive" and "Soviet Snow". "(Glad I'm) Not a Kennedy" became the biggest hit of Laing's career, reaching number 2 in New Zealand and number 9 in Australia. The song also charted in the U.S. on the Billboard Modern Rock Tracks chart at number 14, the first of two singles to chart in the U.S.; the other being "Soviet Snow" which reached number 32 on the Dance Club Songs chart.

South was awarded the IMNZ Classic Record Award at the 2020 Taite Music Prize.

== Track listings ==
All songs by Shona Laing.

1. "Soviet Snow"
2. "(Glad I'm) Not a Kennedy"
3. "Caught"
4. "The Bishop"
5. "Highway Warriors"
6. "Drive Baby Drive"
7. "Under the Cover of Darkness"
8. "Poles Apart"
9. "Neutral & Nuclear Free"
10. "Dockyard on a River"
11. "South"
12. "Soviet Snow" (American Remix)

=== U.S. release ===
1. "Drive Baby Drive"
2. "Caught"
3. "Neat and Tidy"
4. "The Migrant and Refugee"
5. "Soviet Snow"
6. "(Glad I'm) Not a Kennedy"
7. "Your Reputation"
8. "The Bishop"
9. "Dockyard on a River"
10. "Highway Warriors"
11. "South"

== Charts ==
Chart (1987)	Peak position
Australia (Kent Music Report)	62
