= E Ipo =

1982 single by Prince Tui Teka

Single by Prince Tui Teka

from the album The Man, The Music, The Legend
- Released: 1982
- Genre: Contemporary Māori
- Length: 3:45
- Label: Tui Records, RCA Victor
- Songwriters: Missy Teka; Ngoi Pēwhairangi; Prince Tui Teka
- Producer: Dalvanius Prime

Prince Tui Teka singles chronology
"E Hine Hoki Mai" (1974)	"E Ipo" (1982)	"I Need Your Love" (1983)

"E Ipo" (English: "My Darling") is a 1982 song written by Prince Tui Teka and Ngoi Pēwhairangi in tribute to Teka's wife Missy, sung bilingually in Māori and English. The song was a number-one single in New Zealand for two weeks.

The melody was based on the popular Indonesian love song "Mimpi Sedih" by Aloysius Riyanto that Teka had heard from New Zealand soldiers stationed in Singapore while he was performing overseas from 1980-1982.

The video for the song was taken from a TV special filmed at the Mandalay nightclub in Newmarket, Auckland. The song later made the Nature's Best 3 compilation, a collection of the top 100 New Zealand songs as voted by members of APRA.

"E Ipo", alongside "Poi E" (1984) by the Pātea Māori Club (also written by Pēwhairangi) were the first widely successful songs sung in Te Reo Māori in mainstream music, and had a great impact on the promotion of Te Reo and Māori culture in New Zealand.
