= Jesus I Was Evil =

EP by Darcy Clay
- Released: 1997
- Recorded: September–November 1996 except "In The Middle", recorded 31 March 1997 at Progressive Studios
- Genre: Lo-fi, indie rock, alt-country, cowpunk
- Label: Antenna Records

Darcy Clay chronology
Jesus I Was Evil (1997)	Songs for Beethoven (1997)

Jesus I Was Evil is an EP by New Zealand musician Darcy Clay. It was released on Antenna Records in 1997. All songs except for "In The Middle" were recorded on a 4-Track. "Jolene" is a cover of the Dolly Parton song. The title track became Bfm's number one most played song.

== Track listing ==
1. "Jesus I Was Evil"
2. "What About It"
3. "Jolene"
4. "All I Gotta Do"
5. "And It Was Easy"
6. "In The Middle"

== Personnel ==
- All songs executed by Darcy Clay
- All songs written by Clay-Bolton except Jolene by Dolly Parton
- Mixed & Engineered by Darcy Clay & Cameron Fisher
- Mastered by Chris Sinclair
