= Wayne Mason =

New Zealand musician (born 1949)

Wayne Ashley Mason MNZM (born 1949) is a New Zealand musician.

== Biography ==
Mason was born in New Plymouth in 1949. He was a founding member of 1960s pop group The Fourmyula and later formed Rockinghorse and The Warratahs before embarking on a solo career in 1994. Mason has two sons, Josh Mason and Levon Mason, with his longtime partner Jude Walcott. The family has long resided in the coastal settlement of Paekākāriki on the Kāpiti Coast. Levon Mason is also a musician and has performed live alongside his father, Wayne Mason.

Mason wrote a series of hit singles with Ali Richardson for The Fourmyula; his best known song is "Nature", which in 2001 was voted No.1 in a list of the Top 100 New Zealand Songs of All Time. The song, which Mason re-recorded on his 2001 album Same Boy, has also been covered by The Mutton Birds and Margaret Urlich.

In the 2002 Queen's Birthday and Golden Jubilee Honours, Mason was appointed a Member of the New Zealand Order of Merit, for services to music.

== Solo discography ==
=== Albums ===
List of albums
Title	Album details
Between Frames	Released: 1995; Label: Raging Goose (RGDWCD1); Format: CD
Same Boy	Released: 2001; Label: Jayrem Records (CDJAY368); Format: CD
Sense Got Out (as Wayne Mason and the Fallen Angels)	Released: 2007; Label: Ode Records (CDMANU5033); Format: CD

== Awards ==
=== Aotearoa Music Awards ===
The Aotearoa Music Awards (previously known as New Zealand Music Awards (NZMA)) are an annual awards night celebrating excellence in New Zealand music and have been presented annually since 1965.

Year	Nominee / work	Award	Result	Ref.
2010	Wayne Mason (as part of The Fourmyula)	New Zealand Music Hall of Fame	inductee	
