= More Nature =

Compilation album by Nature's Best series
- Released: 25 January 2006
- Label: Sony Music New Zealand

Nature's Best series chronology
Nature's Best Box Set	More Nature

More Nature is a one-disc compilation album of twenty notable New Zealand popular music songs from 2000 to 2005, intended to be a supplement to the Nature's Best series of compilation albums. The song selection for More Nature was not voted on by Australasian Performing Right Association members as were the Top 100 New Zealand Songs of All Time (the Nature's Best list of 100 songs). All of the songs on this album were selected because they had been released after the voting for the Nature's Best song list was conducted. The album was certified platinum.

== Track listing ==
1. "The Otherside" - Breaks Co-op
2. "Maybe Tomorrow" - Goldenhorse
3. "Won't Give In" - The Finn Brothers
4. "Sophie" - Goodshirt
5. "Arithmetic" - Brooke Fraser
6. "Walkie Talkie Man" - Steriogram
7. "Fools Love" - Misfits of Science
8. "I Got" - Fast Crew
9. "Not Many" - Scribe
10. "Harmonic Generator" - The Datsuns
11. "Weapons of War" - The Feelers
12. "Verona" - Elemeno P
13. "Phlex" - Blindspott
14. "Misty Frequencies" - Che Fu
15. "Clav Dub" - Rhombus
16. "It's On" - Nesian Mystik
17. "Giddy Up" - Katchafire
18. "We Gon Ride" - Dei Hamo
19. "Listening for the Weather" - Bic Runga
20. "Welcome Home" - Dave Dobbyn
