= The Fourmyula =

New Zealand rock group

- Origin: Upper Hutt, New Zealand
- Genre: Rock
- Years active: 1967–1971, 2010
- Label: EMI (1992 - present)
- Past members: Wayne Mason; Martin Hope; Ali Richardson; Chris Parry; Carl Evensen

The Fourmyula were a New Zealand rock group formed in 1967 in Upper Hutt. They achieved considerable local success in the late 1960s, with nine of their thirteen singles reaching the New Zealand Top 20.

== Career (1967–1971) ==
The group initially consisted of Wayne Mason (guitar, keyboards, vocals), Martin Hope (guitar and vocals), Ali Richardson (bass and vocals), and Chris Parry (drums), who founded Fiction Records (UK) in 1978. They were joined in 1968 by Carl Evensen as lead vocalist.

Their first release, "Come With Me" made it to number 2 in August 1968. They released thirteen singles (nine of which reached the New Zealand Top 20) and five albums and won the New Zealand Entertainers of the Year award in 1970.

The Fourmyula's best known song, "Nature", written by Wayne Mason and produced by Peter Dawkins, reached number one in the New Zealand charts in December 1969. It won the APRA Silver Scroll Award for the year. The Mutton Birds released a rockier version of "Nature" in 1995, and in 2001 the original version was voted New Zealand's greatest pop song ever - becoming the title track of the best-selling Nature's Best compilation.

== Reunion (2010) ==
In 2010 the band reformed to promote the compilation The Complete Fourmyula, a 4-CD set which includes a previously unreleased album Turn Your Back on the Wind, originally recorded for Decca. They played two concerts, one in Auckland on 18 February 2010 and another in Upper Hutt, on 20 March 2010.

The Fourmyula was inducted into the New Zealand Music Hall of Fame at the 2010 APRA Silver Scroll Awards.

== Discography ==
=== Studio albums ===
Title	Details
The Fourmyula	Released: 1968; Label: His Master's Voice (CSDM 6283)
Green B Holiday	Released: 1968; Label: His Master's Voice (CSDM 6296)
Creation	Released: 1969; Label: His Master's Voice (CSDM 6309)

=== Live albums ===
Title	Details
A 'Live (with Shane)	Released: 1970; Label: His Master's Voice (CSDM 6313)

==== Compilation albums ====
Title	Details	Chart Positions
Title	Details	NZ
A Portrait of the Fourmyula	Released: 1974; Label: Axis (AXIS 2003)	–
The Most of the Fourmyula	Released: 1992; Label: EMI (435403 2)	–
The Very Best of the Fourmyula	Released: 1999; Label: EMI (521924 2)	–
The Complete Fourmyula	Released: May 2010; Label: His Master's Voice (50999 6265042 7); Note: 4xCD	35
Turn Your Back on the Wind	Released: 2010; Label: His Master's Voice (CSDM 6324); Note: Unreleased album recorded in London 1970	-
Inside the Hutt: New Zealand's Pop-Psych Kingpins 1968–1969	Released: September 2013; Label: RPM Records (Retro932)	–

=== Extended Plays ===
Title	Details
Four Hits of the Fourmyula	Released: 1969; Label: His Master's Voice (GESM 6138)

=== Singles ===
Year	Single	Chart Positions
Year	Single	NZ
1968	"Come with Me"	2
1968	"Alice Is There"	4
1968	"I Know Why"	7
1969	"Start by Giving to Me"	21
1969	"Home"	8
1969	"Forever"	–
1969	"Lady Scorpio"	7
1969	"I'll Sing You a Song"	3
1969	"Nature"	1
1970	"Make Me Happy"	19
1970	"Otaki"	15
1970	"Turn Your Back on the Wind"	–
1971	"Lullaby"	21

== Awards and nominations ==
=== Aotearoa Music Awards ===
The Aotearoa Music Awards (previously known as New Zealand Music Awards (NZMA)) are an annual awards night celebrating excellence in New Zealand music and have been presented annually since 1965.

Year	Nominee / work	Award	Result	Ref.
1968	"Alice Is There"	Single of the Year	Nominated	
1970	"Nature"	Single of the Year	Nominated	
2010	The Fourmyula	New Zealand Music Hall of Fame	inductee	

== See also ==
- Nature's Best
