= Mike Chunn =

New Zealand musician

Mike Chunn CNZM
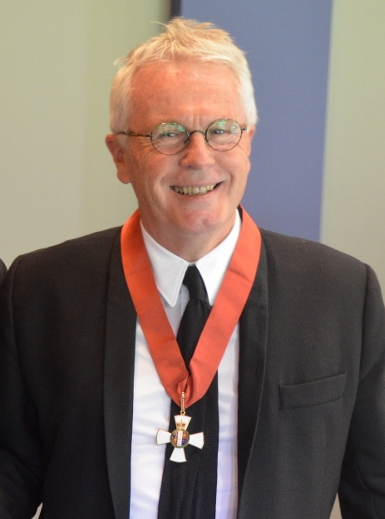
- Chunn in 2015, after his investiture as a Companion of the New Zealand Order of Merit by the Governor-General of Sir Jerry Mateparae

Background information
- Born: Jonathon Michael Chunn; 8 June 1952 (age 74); London, England
- Occupation: Musician
- Instrument: Bass
- Formerly of: Split Enz, Citizen Band

Jonathan Michael Chunn CNZM (born 8 June 1952) is a former member of the New Zealand bands Split Enz and Citizen Band. He performed alongside his brother Geoff Chunn in both bands. His musical performing career was cut short due to agoraphobia.

== Biography ==
Chunn was born in London, England, he spent eleven years as Director of New Zealand operations for the Australasian Performing Right Association (APRA), retiring from the role at the end of October 2003. He was CEO of Play It Strange Trust until November 2023, which encourages teenagers to try songwriting, and which he founded in April 2004.

He has published several books, including the Split Enz biography Stranger Than Fiction.

In the 2002 Queen's Birthday and Golden Jubilee Honours, Chunn was appointed an Officer of the New Zealand Order of Merit, for services to music. He was promoted to Companion of the same order in the 2015 New Year Honours, for services to music and mental health awareness.

Chunn has been involved in numerous endeavours, including founding the Play it Strange Trust.

In 2016, he was presented with a Scroll of Honour from the Variety Artists Club of New Zealand for services to New Zealand entertainment.

== Books ==
- Chunn, Mike, Stranger Than Fiction: The Life and Times of Split Enz, GP Publications, 1992. ISBN 1-86956-050-7
- Chunn, Mike, Stranger Than Fiction: The Life and Times of Split Enz, (revised, ebook edition), Hurricane Press, 2013. ISBN 978-0-9922556-3-3
- Chunn, Mike and Chunn, Jeremy, The Mechanics of Popular Music, A New Zealand Perspective, GP Publications, 1995. ISBN 1-86956-130-9
- Chunn, Mike, Seven Voices – Tales of Madness & Mirth, Purple Egg Press, 1997. ISBN 0-473-05021-8
- Chunn, Mike and Chunn, Jeremy, and Chunn, Barney, I'm with the Band, Hurricane Press, 2011. ISBN 978-0-9864684-6-9
