= Emma Paki =

New Zealand singer and songwriter

- Born: January 1968 (age 58); Whakatāne, New Zealand
- Occupation: Singer/songwriter

Emma Paki (born January 1968) is a New Zealand singer-songwriter.

== Musical career ==
Her debut single "System Virtue" (produced by Jaz Coleman) won her best songwriter at the RIANZ 1993 New Zealand Music Awards. The video for the song was directed by Josh Frizzell and Matt Noonan and won Best Video at the same awards show. It went on to be the most played New Zealand music video in 1994.

Her next single "Greenstone" went into the NZ Top 10, and won her a nomination for Best Female Vocalist in 1994. Her debut album "Oxygen of Love" released in 1996 reached gold status and she gained a second nomination for Best Female Vocalist, as well as a Best Album nomination in the 1997 New Zealand Music Awards. Her most recent single was "Century Sky", in 2007.

== Discography ==
=== Studio albums ===
Title	Details	Peak chart positions
Title	Details	NZ
Oxygen of Love	Released: 6 September 1996; Label: Virgin (4713182); Format: CD	5

=== EPs ===
Title	Details	Peak chart positions
Title	Details	NZ
Trinity	Released: 2010; Label: Heart Music (HMCD002); Format: CD	–
"–" denotes a recording that did not chart or was not released in that territory.

=== Singles ===
Single	Year	Peak chart positions	Album
Single	Year	NZ	Album
"System Virtue"	1993	—	Oxygen of Love
"Greenstone"	1994	9	Oxygen of Love
"Don't Give It Up"	1996	33	Oxygen of Love
"Stand Alone"	2004	—	Trinity
"Paradise"	2005	—	Oxygen of Love
"Century Sky"	2007	—	Trinity
"–" denotes a recording that did not chart or was not released in that territory.

== Awards ==
RIANZ New Zealand Music Awards
Year	Award	Work	Result
1994	Most Promising Female Vocalist		Won
1994	Best Song Writer	"System Virtue"	Won
1995	Best Female Vocalist		Nominated
1997	Best Female Vocalist		Nominated
1997	Album of the Year	Oxygen of Love	Nominated
1997	Best Mana Maori Album	Oxygen of Love	Won
