= (Glad I'm) Not a Kennedy =

1987 single by Shona Laing

Single by Shona Laing

from the album South
- B-side: "Neutral and Nuclear Free"
- Released: 1987
- Length: 3:26
- Label: Pagan; Virgin; TVT
- Songwriter: Shona Laing
- Producer: Bruce Lynch

Shona Laing singles chronology
| "One in a Million" (1985) | "(Glad I'm) Not a Kennedy" (1987) | "Drive Baby Drive" (1987) |

"(Glad I'm) Not a Kennedy" is a song by New Zealand musician Shona Laing. According to Laing, the inspiration for the song was her reaction to a television appearance of American politician Edward "Ted" Kennedy. The song was originally released as a single in 1985, titled "Not a Kennedy", and was included on Laing's 1985 album Genre. It was re-mixed and re-released in 1987, and this version was included on her 1987 album South. The song reached number two in New Zealand, number nine in Australia, and number 14 on the US Billboard Modern Rock Tracks chart.

== Charts ==
=== Weekly charts ===
| Chart (1987–1988) | Peak position |
|---|---|
| Australia (Kent Music Report) | 9 |
| New Zealand (Recorded Music NZ) | 2 |
| US Modern Rock Tracks (Billboard) | 14 |

=== Year-end charts ===
| Chart (1987) | Position |
|---|---|
| Australia (Australian Music Report) | 83 |
| New Zealand (RIANZ) | 36 |
