= Peking Man (band) =

New Zealand new wave band

- Origin: Auckland, New Zealand
- Genre: New wave
- Years active: 1985-1988
- Label: CBS Records
- Past members: Margaret Urlich; Pat Urlich; Tim Calder; Perry Marshall; Jay Foulkes; Neville Hall; John Fearon; Jay F-bula

Peking Man were a 1980s New Zealand new wave band made up of Margaret and Pat Urlich, Tim Calder, Perry Marshall, Jan Foulkes, Neville Hall, John Fearon and Jay F-bula. The band had a number of hits in their homeland.

== Discography ==
=== Studio albums ===
Year	Title	Details	Peak chart positions
Year	Title	Details	NZ
1986	Peking Man	Label: CBS Records	6

=== Singles ===
Year	Title	Peak chart positions	Album
Year	Title	NZ	Album
1985	"Lift Your Head Up High"	21	Peking Man
1985	"Room That Echoes"	1	Peking Man
1986	"Good Luck To You"	6	Peking Man

== Awards ==
New Zealand Music Awards RIANZ
Year	Award	Details	Result	Reference
1985	Engineer of the Year	Graeme Myhre - "Lift Your Head Up High"	Won	
1985	Producer of the Year	Graeme Myhre - "Lift Your Head Up High"	Nominated	
1985	Group of the Year	Peking Man	Nominated	
1985	Male of the Year	Pat Urlich (Peking Man)	Nominated	
1985	Single of the Year	"Lift Your Head Up High"	Nominated	
1986	Album of the Year	Peking Man	Won	
1986	Single of the Year	"Room That Echoes"	Won	
1986	Engineer of the Year	Graeme Myhre (Peking Man)	Won	
1986	Producer of the Year	Bruce Lynch (Peking Man)	Won	
1986	Best Group	Peking Man	Won	
1986	Best Album Cover	Phil O'Reilly (Peking Man)	Won	
