= Geoff Chunn =

New Zealand musician

Geoff Chunn is a New Zealand musician, best known as an early member of Split Enz.

Chunn was a teenage friend of Tim Finn. Together the two of them and Chunn's elder brother, Mike Chunn, founded the band Stillwater while at high school in the late 1960s. When Stillwater split up in 1971, Chunn joined acoustic group Rosewood.

In late 1972, Mike Chunn was approached by Finn to join his new band, Split Ends, which he duly did. The following year, Geoff joined the band as drummer, staying with the band (called Split Enz from early 1974) until June 1974. Following his departure from Split Enz, Chunn briefly drummed for Dragon in 1974, before forming Citizen Band in 1977 with his brother Mike. Citizen Band saw Geoff Chunn move away from drums to become the group's principal singer, guitarist and songwriter.
