= Darcy Clay =

- Born: Daniel Robert Bolton; 5 December 1972
- Died: 15 March 1998 (aged 25)
- Years active: 1997–1998

Darcy Clay (born Daniel Robert Bolton, 5 December 1972 – 15 March 1998) was a New Zealand singer, songwriter and musician, who was made famous in 1997 for his Number 5 hit "Jesus I Was Evil", in which he recorded all of the instruments in his bedroom on a 4-track recorder. He was signed to Antenna Records.

== Background ==
Darcy grew up in Birkenhead, Auckland. When he was 14 years old he spent 9 months living in Atlanta, Georgia and later lived for 18 months in the Blue Mountains of New South Wales, Australia with his Aunt, Che, her husband, Peter, and his cousin, Madelaine.

Darcy Clay's favourite bands were Mötley Crüe, Twisted Sister, AC-DC, Van Halen, Led Zeppelin, and a variety of other metal bands and a broad variety of country and other western music. He very much enjoyed The Highwaymen and had a deep appreciation of the Beatles and Bob Dylan. All of his songs on the EP "Jesus I was Evil" were written (except "Jolene"), played (all instruments and vocals), recorded, and produced by Darcy Clay alone.

== Music ==
Clay's entire career output consisted of two six track EPs, Jesus I Was Evil and (posthumously) a live EP Songs For Beethoven, recorded on DAT tape when he opened for Blur's 1997 New Zealand performance (including a solo performance of "Candle in the Wind", the tribute to Marilyn Monroe written by Elton John and Bernie Taupin who later re-recorded it as a tribute to Princess Diana, who had died less than two months beforehand). The two EPs were reissued back to back as an album entitled Darcy Anthology, featuring a bonus CD of all of Darcy Clay music videos, interview footage and press clippings created before his death in 1998.

His music has been described as "country-fried punk rock" - his Jesus I Was Evil EP featured a cover of Dolly Parton's Jolene, amongst other somewhat country-flavoured rock songs.

Clay's song "Jesus I Was Evil" was covered by Australian group Butterfingers, and his song "All I Gotta Do" was covered by Justin Hawkins' (of The Darkness) solo outfit Hot Leg in 2009

== Awards ==
Awards	Year	Category	Work	Result
RIANZ	1998	Single of the Year	"Jesus I Was Evil"	Nominated
RIANZ	1998	Most Promising Male Vocalist		Won

== Death ==
Darcy Clay died by suicide on 15 March 1998. At the time of his suicide Clay was scheduled to perform on 9 April 1998 at the Levi's Life Festival, a suicide prevention and awareness event.
