= Prince Tui Teka =

New Zealand actor-singer

- Born: Tumanako Teka; 28 January 1937; Ruatahuna, New Zealand
- Died: 23 January 1985 (aged 47) Ruawai, Northland, New Zealand
- Genres: Folk, contemporary, pacifica
- Occupations: Actor, singer-songwriter
- Instruments: Vocal, guitar, saxophone
- Years active: 1951–1985

Tumanako "Tui" Teka (28 January 1937—23 January 1985), better known by his stage names Tui Latui or Prince Tui Teka, was a Māori singer and actor. Teka was a member of the Maori Volcanics Showband before having a successful solo career.

== Career ==
Teka was born in Ruatāhuna, New Zealand near Te Urewera. His parents were both musicians, and he learnt to play the guitar and saxophone at a young age.

He moved to Sydney in the early 1950s. In 1959, Teka, Jonny Nicol, and Mat Tenana joined the Royal Samoans and Maoris. The band was later renamed Prince Tui Latui & The Maori Troubadours. In 1968, he joined Maori Volcanics Showband, touring the Pacific for six years. In 1972, he began his solo career, and returned home releasing two albums: Real Love and Oh Mum, as well as the Māori love song "E Ipo".

In 1974, he met with Noel Tio; both Tui and Noel had known each other since 1958, so Noel Tio Enterprises Pty Ltd. became his (Australia only) manager for 11 years. Before his death in 1985, he was in the West German TV series Jack Holborn and starred in New Zealand films Came a Hot Friday and Savage Islands.

Teka died in 1985, aged 47, of a heart attack in his room while waiting to perform at the Ruawai Tavern in Northland, and was survived by his wife Missy and daughters Davinia and Missy Jr. Missy died in 2008 in a motor vehicle accident.

== Discography ==
Singles
Year	Title	New Zealand Chart (peak)	Album
1982	E Ipo	1	The Man, The Music, The Legend
1985	Out in the cold	30	The Greatest

Albums
Year	Title	New Zealand Chart (peak)	Certification
1975	Tui - The Entertainer	39	
1982	The Man The Music The Legend	5	
1982	The Best Of Prince Tui Teka	28	
1983	Prince Tui Teka - Live	9	
1984	The Prince Tui Teka Show	38	
2002	The Greatest	2	
2016	E Ipo: The Very Best Of	19	NZ Platinum
