= Greg Johnson (musician) =

New Zealand singer

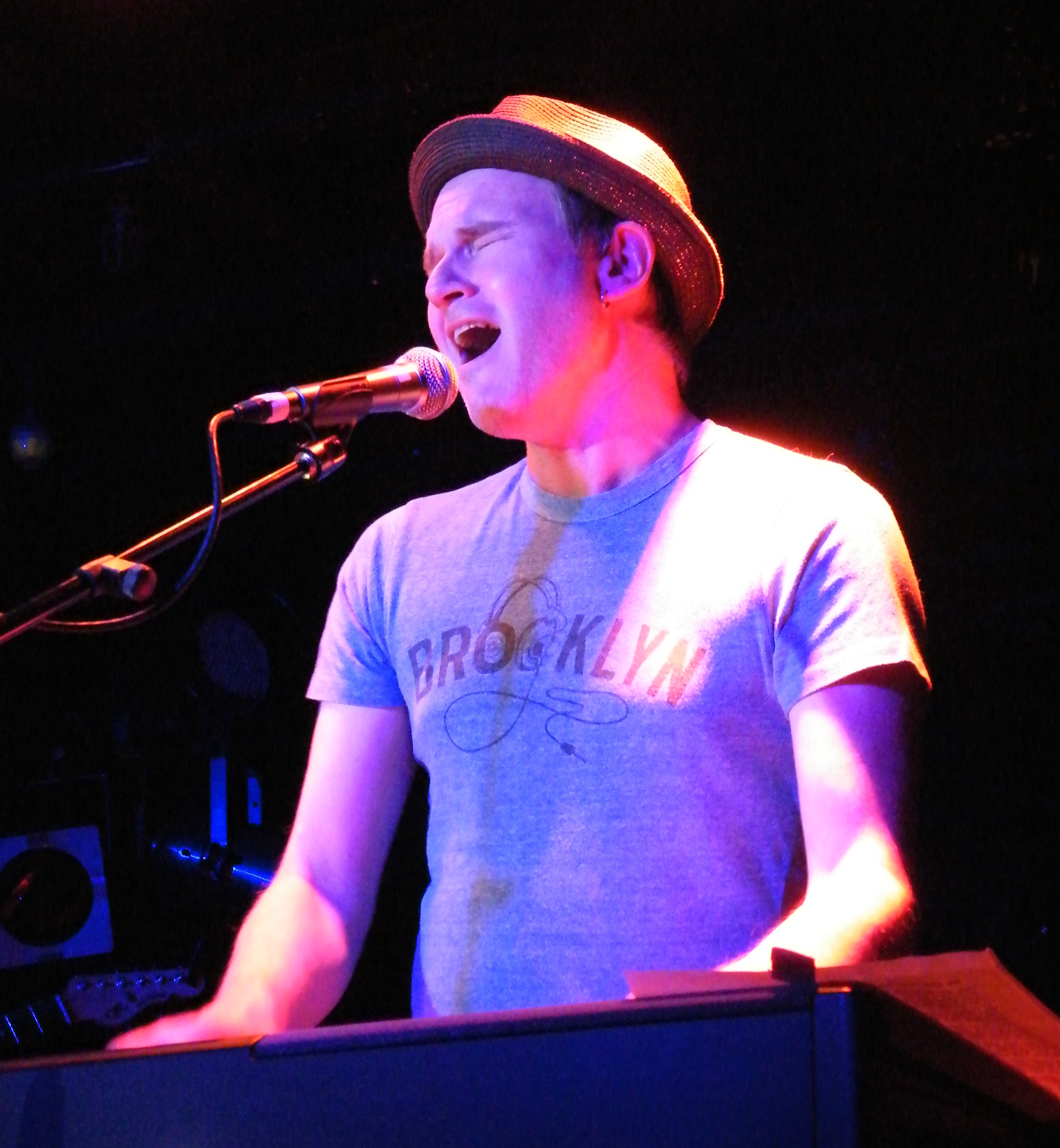
- Johnson in 2012

Background information
- Born: January 7, 1966 (age 60); Auckland, New Zealand
- Genre: Alternative
- Years active: 1987-present

Greg Johnson (born 7 January 1966) is a New Zealand singer songwriter.

== Music career ==
Johnson was born in Auckland, New Zealand. He joined the early New Wave scene at age 15, playing in bands at live venues in New Zealand, including Mainstreet Cabaret, the Reverb Room, The Windsor Castle and The Esplanade Hotel.

In 1987, he signed with Trevor Reekie, who owned indie label Pagan Records, releasing an EP under the name This Boy Rob before starting The Greg Johnson Set with Nigel Russell of The Spelling Mistakes, Danse Macabre and The Car Crash Set. The band recorded an album The Watertable in 1989 followed by Everyday Distortions in 1991. The single "Isabelle," produced by Mark Tierney, reached number 4 on the New Zealand charts.

In 1995, he signed with EMI Records. He released Vine Street Stories, which was produced and recorded at his Auckland home, followed by Chinese Whispers and Seabreeze Motel. That year, Johnson won New Zealand's Top Male Vocalist at New Zealand Music Awards.

In 1997, Johnson won the APRA Silver Scroll, New Zealand's most prestigious songwriting award, for "Liberty" from the album Chinese Whispers.

Johnson moved to Los Angeles in 2002 after signing a contract with Immergent Records. In 2002, he won NZ Tui Best Compilation Album 2003 for The Best Yet. Johnson released the albums Here Comes The Caviar in 2004 and Anyone Can Say Goodbye in 2006, followed by Seven Day Cure, Secret Weapon, Exits, and Swing The Lantern.

In 2005, Johnson performed a collection of his songs with The Auckland Philharmonia Orchestra at Auckland's Aotea Concert Hall. In 2005, his song "Save Yourself" from the album Here Comes The Caviar broke on over 50 US Adult Alternative Radio stations. While touring in the US, Johnson and his band performed a sell-out show at Boston's Paradise Lounge in August 2006.

Songs by Johnson have been placed in TV shows: The Hills, Party of Five, Beautiful People, High School Reunion, Road Rules, Castle, The Brokenwood Mysteries, and 800 Words. Film score and placements include Fifty Pills and Last Chance Harvey. In 2018 Johnson scored a documentary on New Zealand wine, A Seat At The Table, which won 2019 Best Of The Fest at the Vancouver International Film Festival.

He continues to tour frequently in New Zealand, Australia, the US, and Europe. In 2018-19, he toured with his Every Song has A Story show, which features visuals and stories behind the songs and albums. In March 2024, Johnson toured in New Zealand.

In 2020 he produced a compilation of his songs and albums to date, The Digital Box. This coincided with the release of his 2021 album, Tilt Your Interior. His 13th studio album, Thunder In Fall, was scheduled to be released via streaming services in February 2024.

== Discography ==
=== Studio albums ===
Year	Album	Peak chart positions
Year	Album	NZ
As the Greg Johnson Set
1991	The Watertable	—
1993	Everyday Distortions	25
1995	Vine Street Stories	8
As Greg Johnson
1997	Chinese Whispers	16
2000	Sea Breeze Motel	10
2003	The Lost EP	—
2004	Here Comes the Caviar	20
2006	Anyone Can Say Goodbye	17
2008	Seven Day Cure	20
2010	Secret Weapon	15
2012	Exits	21
2015	Swing the Lantern	—
2021	Tilt Your Interior	25
2024	Thunder in Fall	25
2026	Some Night Somewhere	8

=== Compilation albums ===
Year	Album	Peak chart positions
Year	Album	NZ
2001	The Best Yet	—
2006	Greatest Hits	24
2007	Me and Joanna: US-only release	—
2007	Trouble-Shooters Manual: US-only iTunes release	—
2020	The Digital Box	—

=== Live albums ===
Year	Album
2011	Small Towns Live

=== Singles ===
Year	Title	Peak chart positions	Album
Year	Title	NZ	Album
As the Greg Johnson Set
1991	"Two Feet off the Ground"	47	Everyday Distortions
1992	"Isabelle"	4	Everyday Distortions
1992	"Talk in This Town"	22	Everyday Distortions
1993	"Baby"	—	Everyday Distortions
1993	"Winter Song"	44	Non-album single
1993	"Sun Beat Down"	—	Vine Street Stories
1994	"Come On"	—	Vine Street Stories
1995	"You Stay Out of Your Life"	—	Vine Street Stories
1995	"Don't Wait Another Day"	34	Vine Street Stories
As Greg Johnson
1995	"If I Swagger"	—	Vine Street Stories
1996	"Softly On Me"	—	Non-album single
1997	"Liberty"	—	Chinese Whispers
1997	"My Ship Is Sitting Low"	—	Chinese Whispers
1999	"Hibiscus Song"	—	Sea Breeze Motel
1999	"Beautiful Storm"	26	Sea Breeze Motel
2000	"Cut to the Chase"	—	Sea Breeze Motel
2003	"Save Yourself"	24	Here Comes the Caviar
2004	"Kiss Me"	—	Here Comes the Caviar
2005	"It's Been So Long"	—	Here Comes the Caviar
2005	"Don't Be the One"	—	Here Comes the Caviar
2006	"Now the Sun Is Out"	28	Anyone Can Say Goodbye
2009	"I Got Opinions"	—	Seven Day Cure

=== Bluespeak discography ===
- Late Last Night (1992)
- The Drinking Set
- Dark Blue (1999)

== Awards ==
- NZ Tui Top Male Vocalist 1995
- Winner APRA Silver Scroll for songwriting 1997 with the song "Liberty"
- NZ Tui Best Compilation Album 2003 for "The Best Yet"

== Personal life ==
Since 2002, Johnson has been a US resident, living in California.
