= Shona Laing =

New Zealand singer

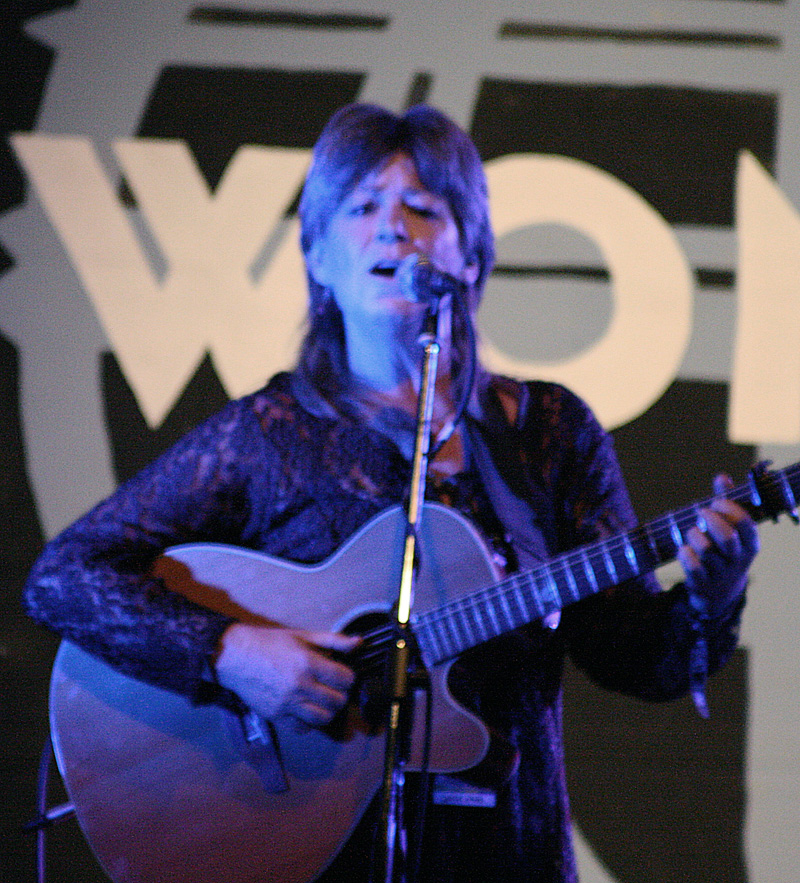
- Laing performing at WOMAD 2009 in New Zealand

Background information
- Born: 9 October 1955 (age 70); New Zealand
- Genres: Rock, new wave
- Instruments: Vocals, guitar
- Years active: 1972–present
- Labels: Vertigo, Philips, Pagan Records, EMI, Virgin, Columbia, Epic
- Formerly of: Manfred Mann's Earth Band

Shona Laing (born 9 October 1955) is a New Zealand musician. She was raised in Eastbourne, a suburb of Lower Hutt, and was a student at Hutt Valley High School when her musical talents first came to public notice. Laing had several folk hits in her native country and in the 1980s became internationally popular for her alternative music, most notably "(Glad I'm) Not a Kennedy" and "Soviet Snow" which was based on the Chernobyl disaster. Various alternative radio stations in the US such as WLIR played songs from her "South" album and she became internationally known. Laing contributed to Manfred Mann's Earth Band album Somewhere in Afrika and contributed music to, and appeared in, the 1985 action film Shaker Run.

== Musical career ==
Laing first came to prominence in 1972 as a 17-year-old schoolgirl, coming runner-up in the television talent show New Faces with her song "1905". She signed a recording contract with Phonogram. Her first two singles, "1905" and "Show Your Love" were both certified gold and each peaked at number 4 on the New Zealand charts. In 1973, she won two RATA awards: Best New Artist and Recording Artist Of The Year. Laing twice represented New Zealand at the Tokyo Music Festival, in 1973 (with the song "Masquerade") and 1974. In 1975, she relocated to Britain and was based there for the next seven years during which time she released a number of singles and an album, Tied to the Tracks in 1981. She joined Manfred Mann's Earth Band for two years, working alongside English musician Chris Thompson for the album Somewhere in Afrika.

Laing returned to New Zealand in 1983, and released her album Genre two years later, in 1985. The song "(Glad I'm) Not a Kennedy" eventually charted in Australia, and was re-released as part of her next album, South. The song reached No. 2 on the NZ Singles Chart in August 1987. Laing won the APRA Silver Scroll in 1988 for "Soviet Snow" and in 1992 for "Mercy of Love".

Laing was inducted into the New Zealand Music Hall of Fame as the Legacy Award recipient at the 2013 New Zealand Music Awards in November 2013. South was awarded the IMNZ Classic Record Award at the 2020 Taite Music Prize.

== Personal life ==
During a concert on 18 July 1996, Laing said she was bisexual and in a relationship with another woman.

== Discography ==
=== Albums ===
Year	Title	Details	Peak chart positions	
Year	Title	Details	NZ	AUS
1972	Whispering Afraid	Label: Vertigo/Philips/Phonogram International	—	—
1974	Shooting Stars Are Only Seen at Night	Label: Philips/Phonogram International; Catalogue: 6334 012	—	—
1981	Tied to the Tracks	Label: EMI Odeon/Parlophone; Catalogue: EMC 3360	—	—
1985	Genre	Label: Pagan Records/Virgin; Catalogue: PAL 1004	—	—
1987	South	Label: Pagan Records/Virgin/TVT; Catalogue: PAL 1031/208 735	16	62
1992	New on Earth	Label: Columbia/Epic/Sony Music; Catalogue: 471514-2	4	—
1994	Shona	Label: TriStar Music/Epic; Catalogue: WK 66165	35	—
1997	Roadworks	Label: Columbia Records/Sony Music; Catalogue: 488241-2	—	—
2007	Pass the Whisper	Released: 1 November 2007; Label: Independent label	—	—
"—" denotes a recording that did not chart or was not released in that territory.

=== Compilation albums ===
Year	Title	Details	Peak chart positions
Year	Title	Details	NZ
1991	1905–1990 Retrospective		19
2002	The Essential Shona Laing	Label: Columbia; Catalogue: 5096842000	—
2020	Hindsight	Label: Frenzy	—
"—" denotes a recording that did not chart or was not released in that territory.

=== Singles ===
Year	Title	Peak chart positions				Album
Year	Title	NZ	AUS	US Dance	US Mod. Rock	Album
1972	"1905"	4	—	—	—	Whispering Afraid
1973	"Show Your Love"	4	—	—	—	Whispering Afraid
1973	"Masquerade"	11	—	—	—	Whispering Afraid
1973	"Someone to Be With"	—	—	—	—	Non-album single
1974	"I'm Crying Too"	—	—	—	—	Shooting Stars Are Only Seen at Night
1974	“Happy Song”	-	-	-	-	‘’Shooting Stars Are Only Seen At Night’’
1975	"Don't You Think It's Time"	—	—	—	—	Non-album single
1975	"I Love My Feet"	39	—	—	—	Whispering Afraid
1980	"Whistling Waltzes"	—	—	—	—	Tied to the Tracks
1980	"Don't Tell Me"	—	—	—	—	Tied to the Tracks
1981	"Overboard"	—	—	—	—	Tied to the Tracks
1981	"Bundle of Nerves"	—	—	—	—	Non-album single
1984	"America"	44	—	—	—	Genre
1985	"Not a Kennedy"	—	—	—	—	Genre
1985	"One in a Million"	—	—	—	—	Genre
1987	"(Glad I'm) Not a Kennedy"	2	9	—	14	South
1987	"Drive Baby Drive"	45	65	—	—	South
1987	"Soviet Snow"	—	—	32	—	South
1987	"Caught (Between the Devil and the Deep Blue Sea)"	—	—	—	—	South
1992	"Walk Away (42nd Street)"	14	—	—	—	New on Earth
1992	"Fear of Falling"	26	—	—	—	New on Earth
1992	"Thief to Silver"	35	—	—	—	New on Earth
1993	"Mercy of Love"	—	—	—	—	New on Earth
1994	"Kick Back"	—	—	—	—	Shona
"—" denotes a recording that did not chart or was not released in that territory.

== Awards ==
=== New Zealand Music Awards ===
Year	Nominee / work	Award	Result
1973	Shona Laing	Recording Artist of the Year	Won
1973	Shona Laing	Best New Artist	Won
1985	Shona Laing – Genre	Album of the Year	Nominated
1987	"Glad I'm Not a Kennedy" – Shona Laing	Single of the Year	Nominated
1987	Shona Laing	Best Female Vocalist	Won
1987	Shona Laing	International Achievement	Nominated
1987	Kerry Brown and Bruce Sheridan – "Glad I'm Not a Kennedy" (Shona Laing)	Best Video	Nominated
1987	Shona Laing	Best Songwriter	Nominated
1988	Shona Laing – South	Album of the Year	Nominated
1988	Shona Laing	Best Female Vocalist	Won
1988	Shona Laing	International Achievement	Nominated
1988	Stephen McCurdy, Shona Laing and Graeme Myhre – "South"	Best Producer	Nominated
1994	Shona Laing	Best Female Vocalist	Nominated
1995	Shona Laing – Shona	Album of the Year	Nominated
2013	Shona Laing	New Zealand Music Hall of Fame	inductee

=== Taite Music Prize ===
Year	Nominee / work	Award	Result
2020	South	IMNZ Classic Record award	Won
