= Andrew Fagan =

New Zealand singer (born 1962)

Andrew Fagan (born 1962) is a New Zealand writer, singer-songwriter and long-distance solo sailor. He grew up in Wellington. He gained fame in New Zealand in the 1980s as the lead singer of the pop group The Mockers.

Following the success of The Mockers' 1985 hit "Forever Tuesday Morning", Fagan won the RIANZ 1985 award for Top Male Vocalist of the Year. Since The Mockers broke up, he has recorded and performed as a solo artist under the name Fagan (releasing his debut solo album Blisters in 1994); and with his band LIG. Owner of the yacht Swirly World In Perpetuity, he has written three accounts of solo voyages he's undertaken; Swirly World, the Solo Voyages (2003); Swirly World Sails South (2012); and Swirly World: Lost at Sea (2024), plus several collections of poetry, being included in anthologies/magazines, and a poetry CD (2018), touring with John Cooper Clarke. He has also been involved with the TVNZ Intrepid Journeys television series.

Fagan has lived in London and now resides in Auckland. He is married to the writer and television/radio broadcaster Karyn Hay. He co-hosted a talkback show with Hay on Radio Live from 7 pm to 10 pm on week nights from 2008 to 2015, with Hay continuing as a solo host until 2017.

Fagan performs regularly around New Zealand with his band Andrew Fagan and the People, including a seven-date North Island tour in April 2021. The band has released two critically praised albums; Admiral of the Narrow Seas (2011) and Act Normal (2020). In 2025, he released a retrospective of his solo work Passage of Time: 1991-2025.

== Discography ==
=== Albums ===
Year	Title	Details	Peak chart positions
Year	Title	Details	NZ
1994	Blisters	Label: Sony	—
1997	Bacterial Activity (as Lig)	Label: Abstract Sounds	—
2011	Admiral of the Narrow Seas (as Fagan and the People)	Label: Aeroplane	—
2020	Act Normal (as Andrew Fagan and the People)	Label: Big Ear Music	—
2025	Passage of Time: 1991–2025	Label: Big Ear Music	25
"—" denotes a recording that did not chart.

=== Singles ===
Year	Title	Peak chart positions	Album
Year	Title	NZ	Album
1991	"I Still Want You"	47	Blisters
1994	"Jerusalem"	39	Blisters
1994	"Exciting"	—	Blisters
1995	"Now You Know"	—	Blisters
1997	"Empty" (with Lig)	—	Bacterial Activity
2011	"Religion" (with Fagan and the People)	—	Admiral of the Narrow Seas
2020	On Channel Me (with Andrew Fagan and the People)	—	Act Normal
2020	"Act Normal" (with Andrew Fagan and the People)	—	Act Normal
"—" denotes a recording that did not chart or was not released in that territory.
