= Eye TV =

- Also known as: Nixons
- Origin: Auckland, New Zealand
- Genres: Alternative rock, Indie rock, Pop rock
- Years active: 1990–2001
- Labels: Pagan Records, Antenna Records
- Past members: Sean Sturm (1990-2001); Mike Scott (1990-2001); Luke Casey (1995-2001); Grant Winterburn (Fire Down Below); Mark Pollard (1990-1995)
- Website: eyetv.co.nz (no longer functional)

Eye TV (formerly 'Nixons') was a New Zealand alternative, indie and pop rock band, founded in Auckland, New Zealand, and active from 1990 until 2001, releasing 4 albums, 2 compilations and 10 singles and cassette singles.

Eye TV was founded by lead singer and guitarist Sean Sturm, drummer Mark Pollard (1990-1995) and bassist Mike Scott in 1990 in Auckland, New Zealand. Eye TV's last album, Fire Down Below (2000), and respectively their last lineup consisted of lead singer and guitarist Sean Sturm, drummer Luke Casey (1995-2001), bassist Mike Scott and temporary keyboard player Grant Winterburn (Fire Down Below). Other featured artists included Caitlin Smith, who provided backup vocals for One Day Ahead (2000) and was later featured in the full release of One Day Ahead (2000) in the album Fire Down Below (2000).

== History ==
=== Formation (1990) ===
The band was formed in Auckland, New Zealand in 1990, under its original name Nixons, playing rock with an electronic edge. The band's original line-up was Sean Sturm on guitar and vocals, Michael Scott on bass and Mark Pollard on drums. In 1991 the band had the track "Song To" included on Flying Nun Records compilation album Freak the Sheep, but surprised their existing fans by signing with Pagan Records. At the time, Pagan records mostly published Pop and Roots music. Sean Sturm still signed with Pagan Records despite that fact, and in a statement: “We signed with Trevor Reekie because he seemed to understand what we wanted to do: complex pop music.”

=== Eye TV (1993) and Special Downtime (1995) ===
Nixons recorded their debut album Eye TV at York Street Studios in 1993 and toured New Zealand. Student radio organisations broadcast their music videos on late night television, giving them a solid base of fans throughout the country. Pollard also arranged a jam band, which played a regular slot at Pelican Club. Sturm often played Rhodes electric piano where the trio experimented with soul grooves and classic R&B.

In 1994 a van full of the band's equipment was stolen, valued at NZ$50,000. Instead of replacing the gear, the Nixons borrowed equipment and used acoustic guitars, leading to a darker, more atmospheric sound on their mini-album Special Downtime. The band's first two albums were released in America, which required the band to change their name as there was an American band called The Nixons. The New Zealand Nixons took the name of their album and became Eye TV. At this time, drummer Mark Pollard left the band and was replaced with Luke Casey.

=== USA Tour and Birdy-O (1997) ===
In 1995 and 1996 the band toured extensively, including an America tour where they playing a number of high-profile support gigs, such as Mr. Bungle and Tim Finn's trio ALT. Eye TV released their second album Birdy-O in 1997, with singles "Snakes and Ladders" and "Wish It All Away" receiving airplay on New Zealand TV and radio. Pagan Records shifted the band onto its sub-label Antenna.

=== Fire Down Below (2000) ===
In 1999 the group recorded the single "Just the Way It Is" with a strong pop focus. It was also the lead track on the group's anthology album As Far as the Eye TV. The group began exploring a soul music sound, with keyboard player Grant Winterburn joining the group. The resulting album Fire Down Below (2000) contained the single "One Day Ahead", which charted at 9 in the New Zealand singles chart, the group's highest-charting single. Eye TV broke up in 2001.

== Awards ==
In 2000 the group's single "One Day Ahead" was nominated for Single of the Year at the New Zealand Music Awards, where they placed within the finalists bracket. Music video director Greg Page was also nominated for Best Music Video for the song's video.

== Discography ==
=== Albums ===
Year	Title	Details	Peak chart positions
Year	Title	Details	NZ
as Nixons
1993	Eye TV (album)	Mini album; Label: Pagan Records; Catalogue: PACD 1120; Format: CD, LP	—
1994	Special Downtime	Label: Pagan Records; Catalogue: PACD 1108; Format: CD, LP	—
as Eye TV
1995	Eye TV (compilation)	Label: Incandescent Records; Catalogue: inc.(60002); Format: CD, LP	—
1997	Birdy-O	Label: Pagan Records	50
1999	As Far as the Eye TV	Compilation album; Released: 4 November 1999; Label: Antenna Recordings; Catalogue: ANT017	—
2000	Fire Down Below	Released: 7 September 2000; Label: Antenna Recordings	10
"—" denotes a recording that did not chart or was not released in that territory.

=== Singles ===
Year	Title	Peak chart positions	Album
Year	Title	NZ	Album
as Nixons
1993	House of Flowers	—	Eye TV
1994	"Tick Tock"	—	Eye TV
1994	Basement Static	—	Special Downtime
as Eye TV
1995	Immaculate	—	Non-album single
1997	Snakes & Ladders	—	Birdy-O
1997	Wish It All Away	—	Birdy-O
1999	Just the Way It Is	13	As Far As The Eye TV
2000	One Day Ahead	9	Fire Down Below
"—" denotes a recording that did not chart or was not released in that territory.
