= Citizen Band (music band) =

New Zealand band

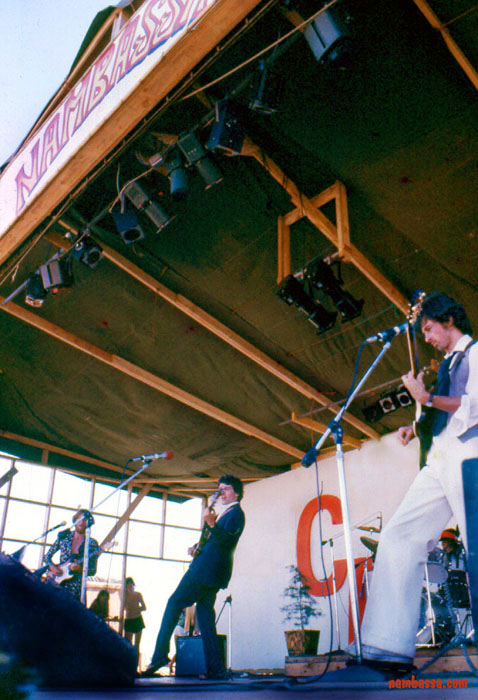
- Citizen Band performing live, 1978

Background information
- Origin: New Zealand
- Years active: 1978–1982, 2016
- Spinoff of: Split Enz
- Past members: Geoff Chunn; Mike Chunn; Greg Clark; Brent Eccles; Roland Killeen

Citizen Band were a New Zealand band formed by the brothers Geoff and Mike Chunn, both of whom had previously been members of Split Enz.

== Band members ==
Geoff Chunn played guitar, sang, and wrote most of the songs. Mike Chunn played bass guitar. Other members were guitarist Greg Clark and drummer Brent Eccles, both previously in New Zealand glam rock band Space Waltz. Formed in 1977 after Mike Chunn left Split Enz due to his struggles with agoraphobia, the band played concerts around Auckland including a free concert in Albert Park and a one-day rock festival. The band recorded their first album Citizen Band at Mandrill studios, produced by the band and Glyn Tucker.

Their second album Just Drove Thru Town was recorded at Mandrill Studios on 18–30 June 1979. It was produced by Jay Lewis and engineered by Glyn Tucker. Two singles were released from the album, "Rust in My Car"/"Dig That Tex" and "No Stereo"/"SOS".

After the band moved to Australia, Mike Chunn left the band, and was replaced by Roland Killeen. The band broke up in 1982.

Citizen Band's original lineup could be regarded as a New Zealand supergroup, as both Chunn brothers were previously in Split Enz, and Clark and Eccles were in glam rock band Space Waltz.

== Discography ==
Date	Title	Label	Charted	Certification	Catalog Number
1978	Citizen Band	Mandrill	27	-	
1979	Just Drove Thru Town	CBS Records New Zealand	18	-	SBP237349
1980	CB Bootleg (Live)		-	-	
1993	Rust in my Car		-	-	

== Concerts ==
In 2012, Citizen Band, along with other NZ bands who played at The Gluepot in the 1970s: Dragon, Hello Sailor, and Street Talk, reunited for a 'Gluepot Reunion' concert.

On 27 May 2016, Citizen Band reformed for a one-off concert at the inaugural Sounds Session organised by The Sound radio station at the Tuning Fork in Auckland. Tickets could only be obtained by winning them from the radio station via a TXT message sent when an earlier named New Zealand song was played (May is New Zealand Music Month).

The play list was:

1. Good Morning Citizen
2. The Man's A Wonder
3. Dig That Tex
4. Julia
5. Rust in My Car
6. I Feel Good

and then an encore of "Hold Tight" a cover of a Dave Dee, Dozy, Beaky, Mick & Tich song.
