= Alastair Riddell =

New Zealand singer

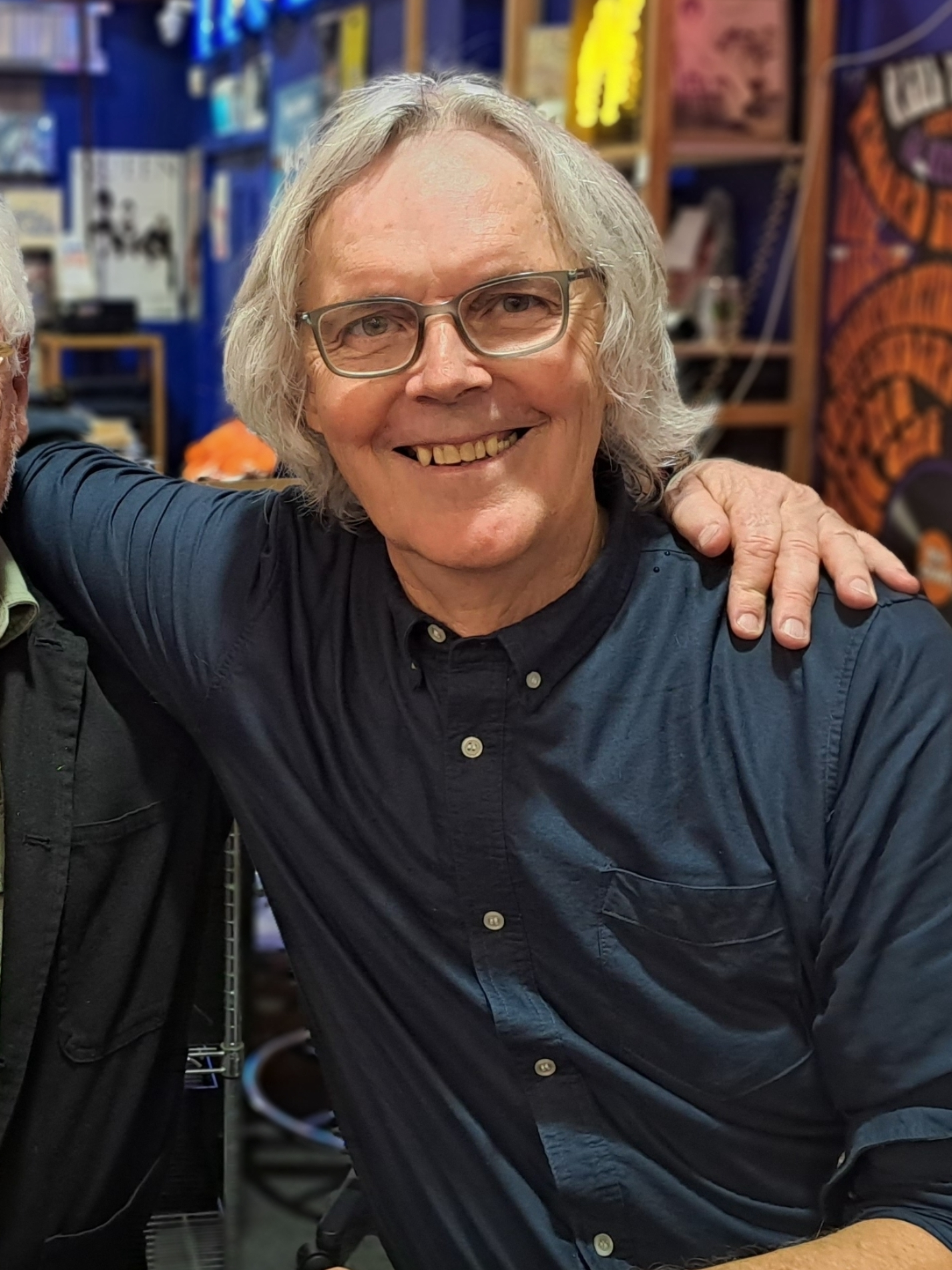
- Riddell in 2023.

Background information
- Born: 1952 (age 73–74); Auckland, New Zealand
- Occupations: Singer-songwriter; producer; director
- Instruments: Vocals; guitar; keyboard; piano
- Years active: 1966–present
- Labels: EMI; Mandrill; WEA

Alastair Riddell (born 1952) is a New Zealand singer-songwriter.

== Background ==
Riddell is a musician and a film maker. He has a singing style that was likened to a combination of Bryan Ferry and David Bowie. Prior to 1974, he was in a band called Orb with Eddie Rayner. Then later, the two of them were in Space Waltz.

In 1968, Riddell started a newsletter called "Bluesnews" and also organised the First National Blues Convention, held at Mollers Farm in Oratia, Auckland.

== Career ==
=== Original Sun ===
In 1967, Original Sun Blues Band was formed by the original line-up consisting of Riddell on rhythm guitar and vocals, his brother Ron on drums, Peter Kershaw on bass guitar and vocals, and Henry Jackson on lead guitar. The band was influenced by John Mayall & the Bluesbreakers and American blues, with the band's name a nod to Son House. After Kershaw and Jackson left the band, the name was shortened to Original Sun and consisted of Alastair (guitar/vocals), Ron (drums), and Peter Cuddihy (bass). The new line-up took on the more adventurous blues sounds of Jimi Hendrix and Cream. There are no known recordings of the band.

=== Orb ===
In 1971, while studying at Auckland University, Riddell formed the Psychedelic Art rock band Orb. They played some of Riddell's original songs, including "Seabird" which would later feature on the Space Waltz album. Orb consisted of Riddell on rhythm guitar, synthesizer, and vocals, Eddie Rayner on keyboards, Paul Emlyn Crowther on drums, Paul (Wally) Wilkinson on lead guitar, and Peter Kershaw on bass guitar. They played the Art's Festival in 1972.

=== Space Waltz ===
In 1974, Riddell formed the glam rock band Space Waltz. The group appeared on the television talent quest New Faces and created a stir with their image. They did not win the finals, but attracted attention from rock fans. They were noticed by EMI and promptly signed to the label. Their single "Out on the Street" was a number-one hit in New Zealand.

The album Space Waltz, which was released by EMI in 1975, featured Riddell, Eddie Rayner, Greg Clark, Peter Cuddihy, and Brent Eccles, with backing vocals from The Yandall Sisters.

=== Post Space Waltz ===
In 1977, the single "Wonder Ones" / "Oh Ron" was released on the Mandrill label. 'The Wonder Ones' band featuring Alastair Riddell on guitar and vocals, Tony McMaster on bass, Paul Baeyertz on keyboards and Paul Dunningham on drums, toured New Zealand between July 1977 and February 1978 including performing at the first Nambassa Music Festival held at Waihi and at The Great Western Music Festival at Oratia in January 1978 . Paul Dunningham had also played at the start of 1977 with Riddell's band Stuart And The Belmonts who were resident at the Stage Door nightclub in Auckland. The 'Wonder Ones' lineup also played on Riddell's album which was recorded at Glyn Tucker's Mandrill Recording Studio in 1977.

In 1978, the self titled album Alastair Riddell was also released on the Mandrill label.

Riddell toured with The Alastair Riddell Band until 1979. The Alastair Riddell Band consisted of Riddell on lead guitar, synthesizer, and vocals, John Treseder on guitar, Gavin Beardsmore on bass, Noel Lamberton on drums and Ruth Hall on backing vocals.

He twice declined invitations to join Split Enz, the first time to replace guitarist Wally Wilkinson in 1975, and then again in 1977 when Phil Judd left the band, with Neil Finn subsequently taking the position.

=== 1980s ===
In 1983, he contributed electronic drums to the number-one hit "Poi E" by Pātea Māori Club. Incidentally, The Yandall Sisters who sang backup on the Space Waltz album appeared on another track of the album that the hit was on. Both "Poi E" and "Out on the Street" appear on the soundtrack for Taika Waititi's 2010 film, Boy.

== Later years ==
In 2012, Riddell directed The Last Stop, a short film set in 1950s New Zealand which featured his wife Vanessa. Also that year he released a single, "Last Of The Golden Weather".

He joined a brief David Bowie tribute tour in 2016 with Jordan Luck, Finn Andrews, Eddie Rayner and others, the same year "Fraulein Love" featured in the trailer for Taika Waititi's 2016 film Hunt for the Wilderpeople.

== Personal life ==
Riddell married English model Vanessa in the 1980s. The couple have four children and live in the West Auckland suburb of Titirangi.

In November 2024, Riddell disclosed that he was battling prostate cancer.

== Discography (selective) ==
Singles
Title	Catalogue	Year	Notes #
"Wonder Ones" / "Oh Ron"	Mandrill M 10005	1977	
"Smile" / "Eyes Of Love"	Mandrill DRILL 9	1978	
"Zero" / "She's In Love"	WEA Z10047	1981	
"Do You Read Me" / "Passion & Love"	WEA 2599317	1982	Engineer: Graeme Myhre
"Let Her Know" / "Futura"	WEA Z10070	1982	

Albums
Title	Catalogue	Year	Notes #
Alastair Riddell	Mandrill MAN 3	1978	
Positive Action	WEA Z20027	1982	
Space Waltz	RPM Records RPM 306	2005	

== Film work ==
Film
Title	Role	Year	Notes #
Desert	sound mixer: festival version	2010	
The Last Stop	director, editor, sound editor	2012	
Colliding Lives	director	2013	
Broken Hallelujah	director, producer, cinematographer, actor	2014	
West of Eden	director, editor, composer	2015	
