= Bic Runga discography =

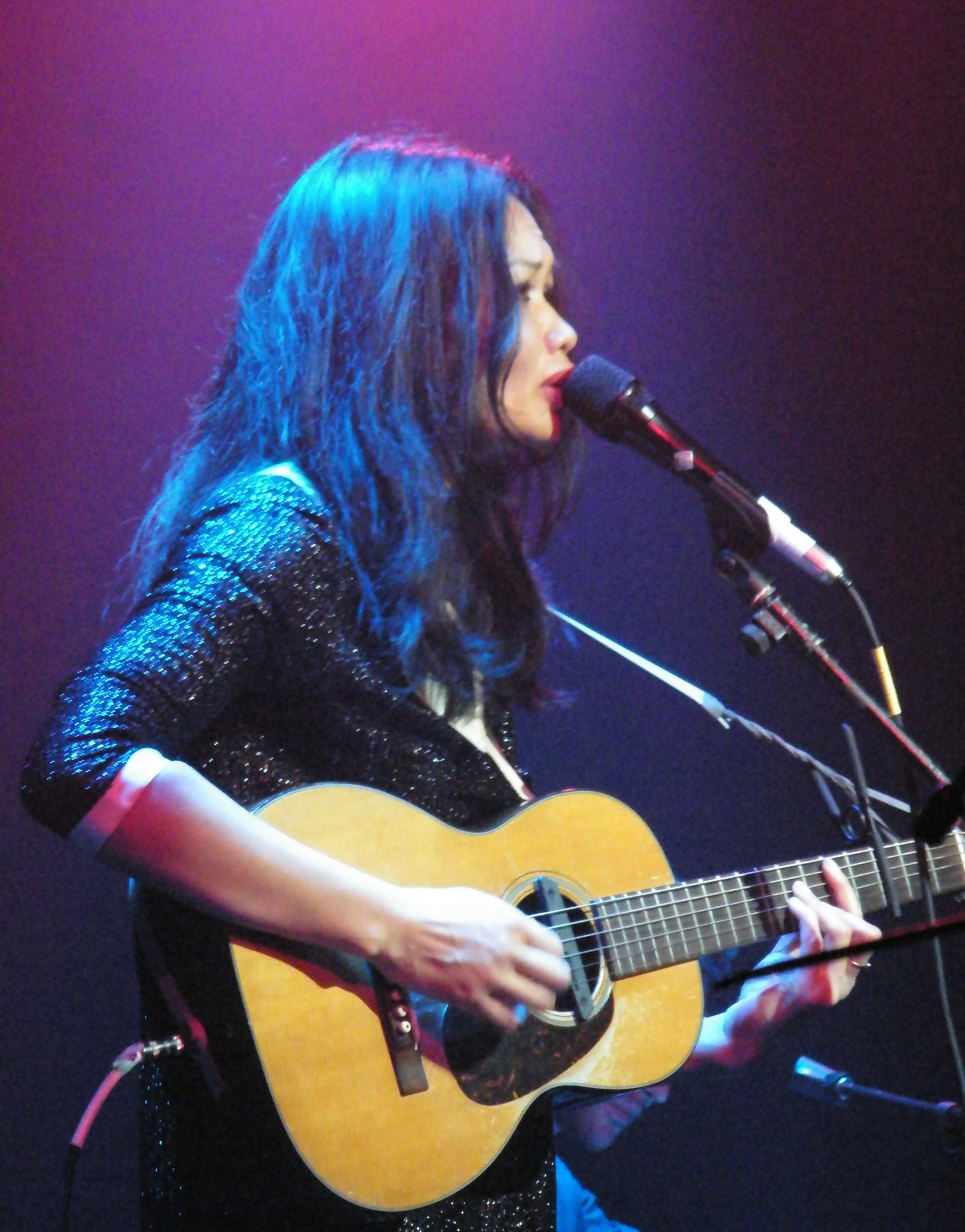
- Runga in 2011
- Studio albums: 6
- EPs: 1
- Live albums: 2
- Compilation albums: 3
- Singles: 21

The discography of New Zealand recording artist Bic Runga consists of six studio albums. In 2016, Runga was inducted in the New Zealand Music Hall of Fame. At the 2023 Rolling Stone Aotearoa Awards, Runga was presented with the prestigious Rolling Stone Icon Award.

== Albums ==
=== Studio albums ===
List of studio albums, with selected chart positions and certifications
Title	Album details	Peak chart positions						Certifications
Title	Album details	NZ	AUS	IRE	ITA	KOR OS	UK	Certifications
Drive	Released: 14 July 1997; Label: Columbia; Format: CD · cassette · digital download · LP	1	50	—	—	—	—	RMNZ: 7× Platinum
Beautiful Collision	Released: 1 July 2002; Label: Columbia; Format: CD · digital download	1	41	7	42	—	55	RMNZ: 10× Platinum
Birds	Released: 28 November 2005; Label: Sony BMG · Columbia; Format: CD · CD/DVD · digital download	1	26	20	—	—	154	RMNZ: 3× Platinum
Belle	Released: 14 November 2011; Label: Sony BMG · Columbia; Format: CD · digital download	5	97	96	—	50	—	RMNZ: Gold
Close Your Eyes	Released: 18 November 2016; Label: Sony Music; Format: CD · LP · digital download	15	—	—	—	—	—	
Red Sunset	Released: 13 February 2026; Label: Bic Runga; Format: CD · LP · digital download	9	68	—	—	—	—	
"—" denotes items which were not released in that country or failed to chart.

=== Compilation albums ===
List of albums, with selected chart positions and certifications
Title	Album details	Peak chart positions		Certifications
Title	Album details	NZ	KOR OS	Certifications
Try to Remember Everything	Released: 21 November 2008; Label: Sony; Format: CD · digital download	28	72	RMNZ: Gold
Anthology	Released: 23 November 2012; Label: Sony; Format: CD · digital download	24	—	
The Very Best of Bic Runga	Released: 27 January 2017; Label: Sony; Format: CD · digital download	— (Note: The Very Best of Bic Runga did not enter the NZ Top 40 Albums Chart, but peaked at number 14 on the NZ Artists Albums Chart.)	20	
"—" denotes items which were not released in that country or failed to chart.

=== Live albums ===
List of albums, with selected chart positions and certifications
Title	Album details	Peak chart positions	Certifications
Title	Album details	NZ	Certifications
Together in Concert: Live (with Tim Finn and Dave Dobbyn)	Released: 5 November 2000; Label: Sony; Format: CD · digital download	2	RMNZ: 3× Platinum
Live in Concert with the Christchurch Symphony	Released: 17 November 2003; Label: Sony; Format: CD · digital download	7	RMNZ: Platinum

== Extended plays ==
List of extended plays, with selected chart positions
Title	EP details	Peak chart positions
Title	EP details	NZ
Drive	Released: 1995; Label: Epic; Format: CD · digital download	10

== Singles ==
=== As lead artist ===
List of singles as lead artist, with selected chart positions, showing year released and album name
Title	Year	Peak chart positions					Certifications	Album
Title	Year	NZ	AUS	IRE	KOR OS	UK	Certifications	Album
"Bursting Through"	1996	33	—	—	—	—		Drive
"Sway"	1997	7	10	26	—	83	RMNZ: 2× Platinum; ARIA: Gold	Drive
"Suddenly Strange"	1997	26	—	—	—	—		Drive
"Roll into One"	1997	48	—	—	—	—		Drive
"Hey"	1998	—	—	—	—	—		Drive
"Good Morning Baby" (Dan Wilson and Bic Runga)	1999	15	—	—	—	—		American Pie
"Sorry"	1999	—	—	—	—	—		Drive
"Get Some Sleep"	2002	3	92	27	—	78	RMNZ: Gold	Beautiful Collision
"Something Good"	2002	4	—	—	—	107	RMNZ: Gold	Beautiful Collision
"Listening for the Weather"	2003	14	—	—	—	—		Beautiful Collision
"Winning Arrow"	2005	23	—	—	—	—		Birds
"That's Alright"	2005	—	—	—	—	—		Birds
"Say After Me"	2006	—	—	—	—	—		Birds
"Hello Hello"	2011	— (Note: "Hello Hello" did not enter the NZ Top 40 Singles Chart, but peaked at number 14 on the Top 20 NZ Singles Chart.)	—	—	—	—		Belle
"Tiny Little Piece of My Heart"	2012	—	—	—	88	—		Belle
"If You Really Do"	2012	—	—	—	—	—		Belle
"Dream a Dream"	2015	—	—	—	—	—		Close Your Eyes
"Close Your Eyes"	2016	—	—	—	—	—		Close Your Eyes
"Kāore He Wā / There Is No Time"	2021	—	—	—	—	—		Non-album single
"It's Like Summertime"	2025	—	—	—	—	—		Red Sunset
"Paris in the Rain"	2025	—	—	—	—	—		Red Sunset
"Red Sunset"	2025	—	—	—	—	—		Red Sunset
"Ghost in Your Bed"	2026	—	—	—	—	—		Red Sunset
"—" denotes items which were not released in that country or failed to chart.

=== As featured artist ===
List of singles as lead artist, with selected chart positions, showing year released and album name
Title	Year	Peak chart positions	Album
Title	Year	NZ	Album
"Drive" (Strawpeople featuring Bic Runga)	2000	7	No New Messages

== Guest appearances ==
Title	Year	Other artists	Album
"Blow"	2015	Silicon	Personal Computer
"Haere Mai Rā / Sway"	2019	—N/a	Waiata / Anthems
