= Anthology (Bic Runga album) =

Greatest hits album by Bic Runga
- Released: 1 December 2012 (New Zealand); 30 November 2012 (Republic of Ireland)
- Recorded: 1997–2011
- Genres: Pop, alternative rock
- Length: 78:34
- Label: Sony Music New Zealand

Bic Runga chronology
Belle (2011)	Anthology (2012)	Close Your Eyes (2016)

Anthology is a compilation album by New Zealand singer-songwriter and multi-instrumentalist Bic Runga. The album was initially set to be released on 23 November 2012, but ultimately released on 1 December 2012 in New Zealand. The album cover was revealed on 29 October 2012.

== Reception ==
Lydia Jenkin from The Herald NZ gave the album 3.5 out of 5 saying; "It's a curious 22-track collection – the inclusion of very early songs remind that Runga was once a youthful, idealistic young girl with a guitar sitting in her bedroom, but they don't showcase the best of her talents. The fact that tracks from her first two albums take up more than half the album, while her strongest releases – Birds and Belle – only get seven tracks between them, heightens the sense that though it's certainly reflective of Runga's whole career, Anthology is not truly a "best of"."

== Track listing ==
All tracks are written by Bic Runga except where noted.

No.	Title	Writer(s)	Original album	Length
1.	"Get Some Sleep"		Beautiful Collision (2002)	3:34
2.	"Sway"		Drive (1997)	4:23
3.	"Listening for the Weather"		Beautiful Collision (2002)	3:29
4.	"Good Morning Baby"	Runga; Dan Wilson	American Pie (1999)	3:29
5.	"Something Good"		Beautiful Collision (2002)	3:18
6.	"Roll into One"		Drive (1997)	3:19
7.	"Drive"		Drive (1997)	2:46
8.	"Bursting Through"		Drive (1997)	3:42
9.	"Say After Me"		Birds (2005)	4:35
10.	"Winning Arrow"		Birds (2005)	2:52
11.	"Hello Hello"		Belle (2011)	2:52
12.	"Suddenly Strange"		Drive (1997)	4:18
13.	"Tiny Little Piece of My Heart"		Belle (2011)	2:15
14.	"Gravity"		Beautiful Collision (2002)	3:39
15.	"Ne me quitte pas" (live)	Jacques Brel	Live in Concert with the Christchurch Symphony (2003)	4:06
16.	"One More Cup of Coffee" (live)	Bob Dylan	Live in Concert with the Christchurch Symphony (2003)	3:50
17.	"Everything Is Beautiful and New"		Belle (2011)	2:57
18.	"Something's Gotten Hold of My Heart"	Roger Greenaway; Roger Cook	Bonus track on Birds (2005)	3:45
19.	"Precious Things" (live with Tim Finn and Dave Dobbyn)		Together in Concert: Live (2000)	4:24
20.	"If You Really Do"		Belle (2011)	3:53
21.	"Birds"		Birds (2005)	3:45
22.	"The Be All and End All"		Beautiful Collision (2002)	3:23
Total length:				78:34

== Weekly charts ==
Chart (2012/13)	Peak position
New Zealand Albums (RMNZ)	24
