= The Black Seeds discography =

- Studio albums: 7
- Extended plays: 1
- Live albums: 1
- Singles: 14
- Music videos: 10
- Remix albums: 2

The Black Seeds, a New Zealand eight-piece reggae band, has released seven studio albums, two remix albums, and a live album. Formed in 1997 in Wellington, New Zealand, the band released their debut studio album, Keep On Pushing L.P, in 2001. Even though this album was on a small budget, it still reached platinum status in New Zealand, as well as having success in Australia. A remix album was also released in 2002 called Pushed, which included songs from the first album remixed by local DJs.

Their second studio album, On the Sun, was released in 2004 and debuted at number 3 on the New Zealand music charts. It later went on to double-platinum status, as well as spawning three singles: "So True", "Turn It Around", and "Fire". "So True" reached number 32 on the New Zealand singles chart, as well as number 29 on the France Groove Chart, and number 100 on the French singles chart.

Into the Dojo was the third studio album released by the Black Seeds, and was released in 2006. It spent five consecutive weeks at number 1 on the New Zealand albums chart and, like their previous album, also achieved double-platinum status. It stayed in the charts for 52 weeks. This album was the start of the band's popularity spreading around the world, with the German-based label Sonar Kollektiv signing them and releasing Into the Dojo into Europe in 2007, as well as two 12-inch vinyl EPs. Four singles were released from this album, including "Cool Me Down", which reached number 26 on the New Zealand single chart.

Solid Ground, the band's fourth studio album, was released in 2008. It reached platinum status in New Zealand as well as reaching number 2 on the music charts. It was also released in Australia and Europe. In July 2009, the Black Seeds signed with American label Easy Star Records, then toured around America supporting John Brown's Body, before John Brown's Body came to New Zealand to tour with The Black Seeds in their home country. During this tour, Solid Ground was released in America and reached number 15 on the US Billboard Reggae chart. During the New Zealand leg of this tour, Live Vol. 1, their first live album was released. It was only made available at their live shows, with tickets brought for these shows, or as a digital download.

== Albums ==
=== Studio albums ===
Year	Album details	Chart peak positions		Certifications (sales thresholds)
Year	Album details	NZ	US Reggae	Certifications (sales thresholds)
2001	Keep On Pushing L.P: Released:	25	—	NZ: Platinum
2004	On the Sun: Released: 29 January 2004; Label: EMI	3	—	NZ: 3× Platinum
2006	Into the Dojo: Released: 12 July 2006; Label: EMI	1	—	NZ: 2× Platinum
2008	Solid Ground: Released: 11 August 2008; Label: Rhythmethod	2	15	NZ: Platinum
2012	Dust and Dirt: Released: 9 April 2012	1	3	
2017	Fabric: Released: 7 September 2017; Label: Rhythmethod	4		
2022	Love & Fire: Released: 17 June 2022; Label: Self-released	16		

=== Live albums ===
Year	Album details
2007	Live Vol. 1: Released: 28 October 2009

=== Remix albums ===
Year	Album details
2002	Pushed: Released:
2010	Specials Remixes & Versions From Solid Ground: Released:
2024	Dub & Fire: The Black Seeds Meets Scientist & Dr. Lee: Released: 18 October 2024

== Extended plays ==
Year	Extended play details
2007	Sometimes Enough: Released: 20 August 2007

== Singles ==
Year	Song	Chart peak positions	Certifications	Album
Year	Song	NZ	Certifications	Album
2005	"So True"	32	RMNZ: 5× Platinum	On the Sun
2005	"Turn It Around"	—	RMNZ: Platinum	On the Sun
2005	"Fire"	—	RMNZ: Platinum	On the Sun
2006	"Sometimes Enough"	—		Into the Dojo
2006	"Cool Me Down"	26	RMNZ: 4× Platinum	Into the Dojo
2006	"The Answer"	—		Into the Dojo
2006	"One by One"	—	RMNZ: Gold	Into the Dojo
2008	"Slingshot"	—		Solid Ground
2008	"Make a Move"	—		Solid Ground
2008	"Take Your Chances"	—		Solid Ground
2012	"Pippy Pip"	—		Dust and Dirt
2023	"Koia Ko Koe (So True)"	— (Note: "Koia Ko Koe (So True)" did not enter the NZ Top 40 Singles Chart, but peaked at number 29 on the NZ Hot Singles Chart.)	RMNZ: Gold	Non-album singles
2025	"Compassion"	— (Note: "Compassion" did not enter the NZ Top 40 Singles Chart, but peaked at number 6 on the NZ Hot Aotearoa Singles Chart.)		Non-album singles
2026	"8 Bit"	— (Note: "8 Bit" did not enter the NZ Top 40 Singles Chart, but peaked at number 8 on the NZ Hot Aotearoa Singles Chart.)		Non-album singles
2026	"Commander" (featuring P.Digsss)	— (Note: "Commander" did not enter the NZ Top 40 Singles Chart, but peaked at number 15 on the NZ Hot Singles Chart.)		Non-album singles
"—" denotes releases that did not chart or were not released in that country.
