= New Zealand top 50 albums of 2005 =

This is the list of the top 50 albums of 2005 in New Zealand.

== Chart ==
Key
‡ – Album of New Zealand origin

Rank	Artist	Title	Ref.
1	Back to Bedlam	James Blunt	
2	Green Day	American Idiot	
3	Coldplay	X&Y	
4	Jack Johnson	In Between Dreams	
5	The Black Eyed Peas	Monkey Business	
6	Foo Fighters	In Your Honor	
7	Eminem	Curtain Call: The Hits	
8	Hayley Westenra	Odyssey^{‡}	
9	Kelly Clarkson	Breakaway	
10	Crazy Frog	Crazy Hits	
11	Gorillaz	Demon Days	
12	Fat Freddy's Drop	Based On A True Story^{‡}	
13	Maroon 5	Songs About Jane	
14	Gwen Stefani	Love. Angel. Music. Baby.	
15	Akon	Trouble	
16	The Feelers	Playground Battle^{‡}	
17	50 Cent	The Massacre	
18	Il Divo	Il Divo	
19	Il Divo	Ancora	
20	Bic Runga	Birds^{‡}	
21	The Killers	Hot Fuss	
22	System of a Down	Mezmerize	
23	Breaks Co-Op	The Sound Inside^{‡}	
24	Goldenhorse	Out of the Moon^{‡}	
25	Donavon Frankenreiter	Donavon Frankenreiter	
26	Dave Dobbyn	Available Light^{‡}	
27	The Game	The Documentary	
28	Nickelback	All the Right Reasons	
29	John Fogerty	The Long Road Home	
30	Live	Awake: The Best of Live	
31	INXS	Definitive INXS	
32	The Offspring	Greatest Hits	
33	Eminem	Encore	
34	Various artists	She Will Have Her Way^{‡}	
35	Destiny's Child	#1's	
36	INXS	Switch	
37	The Exponents	Sex and Agriculture^{‡}	
38	System of a Down	Hypnotize	
39	Audioslave	Out of Exile	
40	Amici Forever	Defined	
41	Russell Watson	Amore Musica	
42	Mariah Carey	The Emancipation of Mimi	
43	David Gray	Life in Slow Motion	
44	Robbie Williams	Intensive Care	
45	Green Day	Bullet in a Bible	
46	Jeff Wayne	The War of the Worlds	
47	Shihad	Love Is the New Hate^{‡}	
48	Enya	Amarantine	
49	The Black Seeds	On the Sun^{‡}	
50	Simple Plan	Still Not Getting Any...	
