= New Zealand top 20 albums of 2006 =

This is a list of the top-selling albums in New Zealand for 2006 from the Official New Zealand Music Chart's end-of-year chart, compiled by Recorded Music NZ.

== Chart ==
Key
‡ – Album of New Zealand origin

Rank	Artist	Title
1	Fat Freddy's Drop	Based on a True Story^{‡}
2	James Blunt	Back to Bedlam
3	Red Hot Chili Peppers	Stadium Arcadium
4	Nickelback	All the Right Reasons
5	High School Musical cast	High School Musical (soundtrack)
6	The Pussycat Dolls	PCD
7	Snow Patrol	Eyes Open
8	KT Tunstall	Eye to the Telescope
9	Johnny Cash	Ring Of Fire: The Legend of Johnny Cash
10	Jack Johnson	Sing-A-Longs and Lullabies for the Film Curious George
11	Tool	10,000 Days
12	Dixie Chicks	Taking the Long Way
13	The Black Seeds	Into the Dojo^{‡}
14	U2	U218 Singles
15	Rod Stewart	Still the Same... Great Rock Classics of Our Time
16	Eminem	Curtain Call: The Hits
17	Bic Runga	Birds^{‡}
18	The Killers	Sam's Town
19	Justin Timberlake	FutureSex/LoveSounds
20	Bob Dylan	Modern Times (Bob Dylan album)
