= New Zealand top 50 albums of 2003 =

This is the list of the top 50 albums of 2003 in New Zealand.

== Chart ==
Key
‡ – Album of New Zealand origin

Number	Weeks in Chart	Artist	Album
1	49	Bic Runga	Beautiful Collision^{‡}
2	48	Norah Jones	Come Away With Me
3	43	Coldplay	A Rush of Blood to the Head
4	49	Nesian Mystik	Polysaturated^{‡}
5	45	Audioslave	Audioslave
6	31	Evanescence	Fallen
7	38	Jack Johnson	Brushfire Fairytales
8	35	Ben Harper	Diamonds on the Inside
9	29	Delta Goodrem	Innocent Eyes
10	39	50 Cent	Get Rich Or Die Tryin'
11	21	Hayley Westenra	Pure^{‡}
12	34	Justin Timberlake	Justified
13	39	Blindspott	Blindspott^{‡}
14	23	Elemeno P	Love & Disrespect^{‡}
15	27	Eminem	The Eminem Show
16	35	The White Stripes	Elephant
17	24	Various	8 Mile
18	23	Avril Lavigne	Let Go
19	22	The Black Eyed Peas	Elephunk
20	28	Linkin Park	Meteora
21	33	Christina Aguilera	Stripped
22	25	Dixie Chicks	Home
23	27	Katchafire	Revival^{‡}
24	23	Jack Johnson	On and On
25	22	John Mayer	Room for Squares
26	22	Bee Gees	The Record
27	24	Matchbox Twenty	More Than You Think You Are
28	28	Good Charlotte	The Young and the Hopeless
29	15	Michael Bublé	Michael Bublé
30	17	Pink	Missundaztood
31	11	Dido	Life For Rent
32	13	Salmonella Dub	One Drop East^{‡}
33	27	Goldenhorse	Riverhead^{‡}
34	16	Santana	Shaman
35	19	U2	The Best of 1990-2000
36	18	Beyoncé Knowles	Dangerously In Love
37	14	LeAnn Rimes	Twisted Angel
38	13	Atomic Kitten	Atomic Kitten
39	13	Metallica	St. Anger
40	17	Pacifier	Pacifier^{‡}
41	11	Outkast	Speakerboxxx/The Love Below
42	8	Scribe	The Crusader^{‡}
43	22	David Gray	A New Day At Midnight
44	17	Carly Binding	Passenger: The Special Edition^{‡}
45	20	Jennifer Lopez	This Is Me... Then
46	11	Sean Paul	Dutty Rock
47	11	Celine Dion	One Heart
48	11	Various	Bad Boys 2 Soundtrack
49	13	Various	Chicago Soundtrack
50	11	Barry White	The Ultimate Collection
