= Good Morning Baby (song) =

Single by Dan Wilson and Bic Runga

from the album American Pie: Music from the Motion Picture
- Released: June 29, 1999
- Length: 3:34
- Label: Uptown, Universal
- Songwriter(s): Bic Runga / Dan Wilson

Bic Runga singles chronology
"Hey" (1998)	"Good Morning Baby" (1999)	"Sorry" (1999)

"Good Morning Baby" is a song by Dan Wilson and Bic Runga. The song was released as a single in New Zealand in June 1999 and peaked at number 15. The song is featured in the 1999 film American Pie soundtrack.

The song was included on a limited edition 2-disc re-release of Beautiful Collision (2003); and a live version of the song did feature on the album Together in Concert: Live, (2000).

== Charts ==
Chart (1999–2000)	Peak position
New Zealand (Recorded Music NZ)	15

== Covers ==
- In 2004, indie singer-songwriter Skott Freedman covered the song with fellow indie musician Edie Carey. The version appeared on Freedman's album "Judge a Book".
