= Live in Concert with the Christchurch Symphony =

Live album by Bic Runga
- Released: November 17, 2003
- Recorded: October 3, 2003 at Christchurch Town Hall, Christchurch, New Zealand
- Genre: Pop
- Length: 46:21
- Label: Sony Music

Bic Runga chronology
Beautiful Collision (2002)	Live in Concert with the Christchurch Symphony (2003)	Birds (2005)

Live in Concert with the Christchurch Symphony is a live album by New Zealand artist Bic Runga, her third album overall. Runga performed with the Christchurch Symphony Orchestra, conducted by Marc Taddei. The performance was recorded in Christchurch on October 3, 2003, and the album was released on November 17, 2003.

== Track listing ==
1. "Precious Things"
2. "Bursting Through"
3. "One More Cup of Coffee"
4. "Ne Me Quitte Pas"
5. "Anyone Who Had a Heart"
6. "Beautiful Collision"
7. "And No More Shall We Part"
8. "Wishing on a Star"
9. "Say After Me"
10. "She Left on a Monday"
11. "Something Good"

== Chart positions ==
Chart (2003/04)	Peak position
New Zealand Albums (RMNZ)	7
