= So True =

Single by The Black Seeds

from the album On the Sun
- Released: 18 July 2005
- Genre: Reggae
- Length: 3:54
- Label: Capitol/EMI

The Black Seeds singles chronology
"So True" (2005)	"Turn It Around" (2005)

"So True" is the first single released by New Zealand reggae band the Black Seeds, in 2005. It debuted on the New Zealand singles chart at No. 32 and stayed on the chart for nine weeks. By 2023, the song had been certified four times platinum in New Zealand.
