= Get Some Sleep =

2002 single by Bic Runga

Single by Bic Runga

from the album Beautiful Collision
- B-side: "You Don't Want to Know"; "Gracie"
- Released: 17 June 2002
- Length: 3:36
- Label: Columbia
- Songwriter: Bic Runga
- Producer: Bic Runga

Bic Runga singles chronology
"Drive" (2000)	"Get Some Sleep" (2002)	"Something Good" (2002)

"Get Some Sleep" is a song by New Zealand singer-songwriter Bic Runga. It was released in June 2002 as the lead single from her second studio album, Beautiful Collision (2002). In New Zealand, "Get Some Sleep" was the most successful song by a native artist in 2002, ranking at number six on the country's year-end chart and peaking at number three on the RIANZ Singles Chart. The song also reached number 27 in Ireland, number 78 in the United Kingdom, and number 92 in Australia.

== Track listings ==
New Zealand CD single

1. "Get Some Sleep"
2. "You Don't Want to Know"
3. "Gracie"

Australian CD single

1. "Get Some Sleep" (album version)
2. "Get Some Sleep" (remix airplay edit)

UK and Irish CD single

1. "Get Some Sleep"
2. "Bursting Through" (CSO live version)

== Personnel ==
Personnel are adapted from the liner notes of Beautiful Collision.

- Bic Runga – vocals, arrangements, production
- Tim Arnold – twelve-string acoustic guitar, vocals
- Milan Borich – twelve-string acoustic guitar, vocals
- Michael Brauer – mixing
- Greg Calbi – mastering
- Ricardo Chavarria – mixing assistance
- Dave Dobbyn – acoustic guitar, electric guitar
- Jay Foulkes – tambourine
- Ben King – vocals
- Boh Runga – vocal guidance and direction
- Sebastian Steinberg – bass
- Joey Waronker – drums

== Charts ==
=== Weekly charts ===
Chart (2002–2004)	Peak position
Australia (ARIA)	92
Ireland (IRMA)	27
New Zealand (Recorded Music NZ)	3
UK Singles (OCC)	78

=== Year end charts ===
Chart (2002)	Position
New Zealand (RIANZ)	6

== Certifications ==
Certifications for "Get Some Sleep"
Region	Certification	Certified units/sales
New Zealand (RMNZ)	Gold	15,000^{‡}
^{‡} Sales+streaming figures based on certification alone.

== Release history ==
Region	Date	Format	Label	Ref.
New Zealand	20 May 2002	Radio	Columbia	
New Zealand	17 June 2002	CD	Columbia	
Australia	8 July 2002	CD	Columbia	
United Kingdom	8 March 2004	CD	Columbia	
