= Red Sunset =

Studio album by Bic Runga
- Released: 13 February 2026
- Length: 29:26
- Label: Bic Runga

Bic Runga chronology
The Very Best of Bic Runga (2017)	Red Sunset (2026)

Singles from Red Sunset
- 1. "It's Like Summertime" Released: 3 October 2025; 2. "Paris in the Rain" Released: 7 November 2025; 3. "Red Sunset" Released: 21 November 2025; 4. "Ghost in Your Bed" Released: 23 January 2026

Red Sunset is the sixth studio album by New Zealand singer-songwriter Bic Runga. The album was announced in September 2025 and was released on 13 February 2026.

Runga toured New Zealand and Australia across March and April 2026 in support of the album.

== Background and release ==
Runga's last album of original material was 2011's Belle and in 2025 got out of her self-described "professional slumber" and flew to Paris telling The Post "I really wanted to bookend the parenthood years with getting back to Paris and seeing it through their eyes, which I did. And I can die happy now, it's sort of all I wanted to do." In Paris, Runga rented an Airbnb with a grand piano and commenced the album, saying "Kody [Nielson] and I just took some recording gear and recorded a lot of the piano tracks in Paris, and took them back home and finished them." The recordings include fragments of ideas that had been living in her brain since she was 20.

In September 2025, Runga performed at the Kiri Te Kanawa Theatre on invitation from Auckland Philharmonia, where she performed three songs from the album.

The lead single "It's Like Summertime" was released on 3 October 2025, which Runga recalled her carefree past while looking towards a hopeful future. saying "I wanted to offer comfort in a time where everyone needs it. The world feels so different now and familiarity provides care and love."

The second single, "Paris in the Rain" was inspired by Runga watching the Louvre Pyramid be battered by torrential rain. Its sound was captured on a historic 1807 French Pleyel piano.

The title track was released on 21 November 2025 and has been described as "a powerful torch song of longing and desire" which "evokes the tumultuous emotions of being the one left behind".

== Reception ==
Lachie Holt from Muzic said "Red Sunset is a fantastic album – one that rewards listening from start to finish. The tracklist is carefully arranged to build atmosphere: the first half leaning into upbeat, almost techno-influenced territory, while the second half becomes more delicate and acoustic." concluding saying "Red Sunset proves she’s still willing to take risks and experiment, while delivering the timeless, unmistakable sound her fans love."

Tony Stamp from Radio New Zealand said the album "draws on vintage French pop...drawing inspiration from that country's pop music of the '60s and '70s". Stamp rated the album 4 1/2 out of 5.

Quentin Harrison from The Line of Best Fit gave the album 8/10 saying "Throughout Red Sunset, Runga's voice sounds as fresh and airy as ever, holding quiet power and expressiveness in balance."

== Track listing ==
1. "Glass Atrium" – 1:26
2. "Red Sunset" – 3:17
3. "Ghost in Your Bed" – 2:48
4. "Paris in the Rain" – 3:13
5. "It's Like Summertime" – 3:52
6. "Escape from Planet Earth" – 2:40
7. "You're Never Really Here (Are You Baby)" – 2:31
8. "Won't You Come Home" – 2:57
9. "Hey Little One" – 3:05
10. "Home Run" – 3:37

== Charts ==
Chart performance for Red Sunset
Chart (2026)	Peak position
Australian Albums (ARIA)	68
New Zealand Albums (RMNZ)	9
