= Only Wanna Be with You (Amy Shark song) =

Single by Amy Shark
- Released: 7 October 2022
- Length: 3:10
- Label: Wonderlick Entertainment; Sony Music Australia
- Songwriters: Amy Shark; Grant Averill; Joe Spurgur
- Producers: Joe London; Konstantin Kersting; Oscar Dawson

Amy Shark singles chronology
"Sway My Way" (2022)	"Only Wanna Be with You" (2022)	"High on You" (2023)

"Only Wanna Be with You" is a song by Australian singer-songwriter Amy Shark. The song was released on 7 October 2022 as the lead single from Shark's forthcoming third studio album.

Shark said "This song is about finding someone who you really love spending time with. Someone who you kind of just can't get enough of, but because you can't be with that person, you date a bunch of other people in hopes that you will form those same feelings with someone else. But you won't, because you only want to be with that other person."

Shark also said "I just wanna make cool songs and cool art. Nothing scares me anymore, I'm making music because I love making music again and not for any other reason. I'm taking a lot more risks without fear."

At the APRA Music Awards of 2024, the song was nominated for Most Performed Australian Work and Most Performed Pop Work.

== Music video ==
The music video was directed by Jeremy Koren and filmed in Melbourne. It was released on 7 October 2022. It shows Shark dancing across the set in front of a backdrop of swirling reds and flashing lights. The red sheet featured silhouettes of a backing band that includes Oscar Dawson her regular drummer Joey Malafu and Soren Walker.

== Reception ==
Poppy Reid from Rolling Stone Australia called the song "a welcome injection of turbo-pop" saying, "the single hits different when compared to Amy Shark's musical canon. It's syrupy-pop with an edge; steeped in sticky Len-like brightness with a Cure-esuqe, crisp and danceable guitar line."

Alex Gallagher from NME called it "a buzzy, high-energy torch song".

Tyler Jenke from Music Feeds said "The production and sonic palette of 'Only Wanna Be with You' recall '80s-era synth-rock and new wave artists such as The Cure."
