= Listening for the Weather =

2003 single by Bic Runga

Single by Bic Runga

from the album Beautiful Collision
- B-side: "Counting the Days" (live); "The Be All and End All" (live)
- Released: 7 April 2003
- Length: 3:29
- Label: Columbia
- Songwriter: Bic Runga
- Producer: Bic Runga

Bic Runga singles chronology
"Something Good" (2002)	"Listening for the Weather" (2003)	"Winning Arrow" (2005)

"Listening for the Weather" is a song by New Zealand singer Bic Runga. It was released in April 2003 as the third single from her second studio album, Beautiful Collision (2002). Upon its release, it reached number 14 on the New Zealand Singles Chart, becoming her most recent top-20 hit in her home country. The Recording Industry Association of New Zealand (now Recorded Music NZ) ranked "Listening for the Weather" as the 36th-most-successful single of New Zealand during 2003.

== Track listing ==
New Zealand CD single

1. "Listening for the Weather"
2. "Counting the Days" (live)
3. "The Be All and End All" (live)

== Personnel ==
Personnel are adapted from the liner notes of Beautiful Collision.

- Bic Runga – vocals, arrangements, harmonica, Wurlitzer, production
- Milan Borich – vocals
- Michael Brauer – mixing
- Greg Calbi – mastering
- Ricardo Chavarria – mixing assistance
- Neil Finn – vocals
- Jay Foulkes – tambourine
- Geoff Maddock – electric guitar
- Sebastian Steinberg – bass
- Joey Waronker – drums

== Charts ==
=== Weekly charts ===
Chart (2003)	Peak position
New Zealand (Recorded Music NZ)	14

=== Year-end charts ===
Chart (2003)	Position
New Zealand (RIANZ)	36
