= Close Your Eyes (Bic Runga album) =

Studio album by Bic Runga
- Released: 18 November 2016
- Studio: The Box (Mission Bay)
- Label: Sony Music New Zealand, Wild Combinations
- Producer: Bic Runga, Kody Nielson

Bic Runga chronology
Anthology (2012)	Close Your Eyes (2016)	The Very Best of Bic Runga (2017)

Singles from Close Your Eyes
- 1. "Close Your Eyes" Released: 14 October 2016.

Close Your Eyes is the fifth studio album by New Zealand singer-songwriter Bic Runga. The album is made up of ten covers and two original tracks. Upon announcement of the album in October, Runga said: "There are so many songs I've always wanted to cover. I wanted to see if I could not just be a singer-songwriter, but someone who could also interpret songs. In the process, I found there are so many reasons why a cover version wouldn't work, perhaps because the lyrics were not something I could relate to first hand, because technically I wasn't ready or because the original was too iconic. But the songs that all made it on the record specifically say something about where I'm at in my life, better than if I'd written it myself. It was a challenging process, I'm really proud of the singing and the production and the statement".

== Critical reception ==
Henry Oliver from The Spinoff said the album is "excellent", adding "Close Your Eyes is a grab bag of genre, emotion and sound". Oliver deemed the highlight "Close Your Eyes" "with its Stereolab-esque layers of voices and organs."

Shane Gilchrist from the Otago Daily Times gave the album 3 and a half out of 5, saying the album has "peaks and plateaus", praising Kanye West's "Wolves", The Meters' "What'cha Say" and Nick Drake's "Things Behind the Sun".

== Track listing ==
1. "Close Your Eyes" (Bic Runga)
2. "What'cha Say" (The Meters)
3. "Wolves" (Kanye West)
4. "Things Behind the Sun" (Nick Drake)
5. "Tinseltown in the Rain" (The Blue Nile)
6. "The First Time Ever I Saw Your Face" (Roberta Flack)
7. "Andmoreagain" (Love)
8. "Viens" (Françoise Hardy)
9. "Dream a Dream" (Bic Runga)
10. "The Lonely Sea" (The Beach Boys)
11. "Life Will Get Better Some Day" (The Mint Chicks)
12. "Only Love Can Break Your Heart" (Neil Young)

== Personnel ==
Credits adapted from CD liner notes.

- Bic Runga – production, vocals (all tracks), bass (4), guitars (1, 4–11), keyboards (3–6, 9, 10, 12), percussion (6), violin (9), art direction
- Kody Nielson – production, bass (1–10, 12), drums (1–10, 12), engineering, keyboards (1–7, 9, 10, 12), mixing, percussion (2, 3, 5, 7–9), vocals (2, 10), photography
- Brian Gardner – mastering
- Sophia Runga-Nielson – vocals (2)
- Joe Ward-Runga – vocals (2)

== Charts ==
Chart (2016)	Peak position
New Zealand Albums (RMNZ)	15
