= Solid Ground (The Black Seeds album) =

Studio album by The Black Seeds
- Released: 2008
- Studio: The Surgery (Wellington)
- Genre: Reggae
- Length: 63:07
- Label: Sonar Kollektiv
- Producer: Mike Fabulous

The Black Seeds chronology
Into the Dojo (2006)	Solid Ground (2008)	Dust and Dirt (2012)

Professional ratings
Review scores
Source	Rating
AllMusic	link

Solid Ground is the fourth album by New Zealand reggae band The Black Seeds released in 2008. It was released in North America in September 2009.

== Track listing ==
1. "Come to Me"
2. "Slingshot"
3. "Take Your Chances"
4. "Love Is a Radiation"
5. "Send a Message"
6. "Make a Move"
7. "One Step at a Time"
8. "Bulletproof"
9. "Afrophone"
10. "Strugglers"
11. "Rotten Apple"
12. "The Bubble"
13. "Make a Move Dub"
