= Birds (Bic Runga album) =

Studio album by Bic Runga
- Released: 28 November 2005 (New Zealand)
- Recorded: Monte Cecilia House, Auckland, New Zealand August / September 2005
- Genre: Acoustic Pop
- Length: 44:36 (NZ); 48:54 (International)
- Label: Sony / BMG
- Producer: Bic Runga

Bic Runga chronology
Live in Concert with the Christchurch Symphony (2003)	Birds (2005)	Try to Remember Everything (2008)

Singles from Birds
- 1. "Winning Arrow" Released: 28 November 2005; 2. "That's Alright" Released: 2005; 3. "Say After Me" Released: 2006

Professional ratings
Review scores
Source	Rating
The New Zealand Herald	link

Birds is the third studio album by New Zealand artist Bic Runga. The album was released in New Zealand on 28 November 2005. The album was Bic's third no.1 album garnering platinum status in its first week. The album was certified 3× platinum. The album won the New Zealand Music Award for Album of the Year in 2006, her second award for Best Album, after her debut release Drive.

== Track listing ==
=== New Zealand and Australia edition ===
All tracks are written by Bic Runga.

No.	Title	Length
1.	"Winning Arrow"	2:53
2.	"Say After Me"	4:36
3.	"Listen"	3:32
4.	"Birds"	3:46
5.	"Ruby Nights"	4:23
6.	"No Crying No More"	2:03
7.	"If I Had You"	4:48
8.	"Captured"	6:03
9.	"That's Alright"	3:22
10.	"Blue Blue Heart"	3:32
11.	"It's Over"	5:38
Total length:		44:36

The Australian release included a second disc of live material recorded at the Civic Theatre in November 2005. The disc incorrectly identifies the recording date as November 2006 — eight months after the release of this edition.

Limited Australian tour edition bonus disc
No.	Title	Length
1.	"Birds"	4:30
2.	"Blue Blue Heart"	3:48
3.	"Ruby Nights"	4:42
4.	"Listen"	3:38
5.	"The Be All And End All"	3:51
Total length:		20:29

=== International version ===
Features an alternate track listing.

No.	Title	Length
1.	"Captured"	6:03
2.	"Birds" (with bird-call)	3:58
3.	"No Crying No More"	2:03
4.	"Winning Arrow"	2:53
5.	"If I Had You"	4:48
6.	"Say After Me"	4:36
7.	"Listen"	3:32
8.	"That's Alright"	3:22
9.	"Blue Blue Heart"	3:32
10.	"Ruby Nights"	4:23
11.	"It's Over"	5:38
12.	"Somewhere in the Night"	4:06
Total length:		48:54

Bonus track on NZ and Australia special edition
No.	Title	Writer(s)	Length
13.	"Something's Gotten Hold of My Heart"	Roger Greenaway; Roger Cook	4:04
Total length:			52:58

=== Special edition bonus DVD ===
Released in New Zealand and Australia, with a cover of "Something's Gotten Hold of My Heart" as a bonus track, plus a DVD featuring 5 live performances and 2 music videos.

1. "Birds"
2. "Blue Blue Heart"
3. "Ruby Nights"
4. "No Crying No More"
5. "Captured"
6. "Winning Arrow" (music video)
7. "Say After Me" (music video)

== Personnel ==
Credits adapted from the album's liner notes.

Performers

- Bic Runga – vocals, guitars
- Ben "Boxcar" Maitland – vocals, guitars, harmonica
- Tim Arnold – guitar (on "Birds" and "That's Alright")
- Shayne Carter – backing vocals
- Anna Coddington – backing vocals
- Neil Finn – vocals, guitars, piano, psalterian, vibraphone
- Riki Gooch – drums, percussion
- Rebecca Harris – harp
- Anika Moa – backing vocals
- Joanna Satomi Schulz – French horn
- Conrad Standish – vocals, bass guitar

Strings

- Miranda Adams
- Mark Bennett
- Christine Bowie
- Artur Grabczewski
- Greg McGarity
- William Hanfling
- Claudia Price
- Katherine Uren

Additional personnel

- Bic Runga – production
- Paul Crowther – drum tech
- Tom Rainey – string arrangements
- Neil Finn – string arrangement (on "Birds")
- Paul Jeffery – studio monitors
- Andre Upston – recording
- Simon Gogerly – mixing
- Ric Levy – assistant mixing
- Marc Taddei – conductor
- John Walsh – guitar tech

== Chart positions ==
=== Weekly charts ===
Chart (2005/06)	Peak position
Australian Albums (ARIA)	26
New Zealand Albums (RMNZ)	1

=== End of year Charts ===
Chart (2005)	Position
NZ Album charts	26
NZ Album charts	17

== See also ==
- List of number-one albums from the 2000s (New Zealand)
