= On the Sun =

Studio album by The Black Seeds
- Released: 7 May 2004
- Recorded: 2002-2003
- Studio: Inca Studios (Wellington)
- Genres: Reggae; dub; roots reggae; funk; soul
- Length: 54:13
- Label: Capitol
- Producers: Lee Prebble; Barnaby Weir; The Black Seeds

The Black Seeds chronology
Keep On Pushing LP (2001)	On the Sun (2004)	Into the Dojo (2006)

Singles from On the Sun
- 1. "So True" Released: 2005; 2. "Turn It Around" Released: 2005

On the Sun is the second album by New Zealand reggae band the Black Seeds, released in 2004. It reached number 3 on the New Zealand albums chart. Its lead single "So True" reached number 32 on the New Zealand singles chart.

== Track listing ==
No.	Title	Writer(s)	Length
1.	"Tuk Tuk" (instrumental)	Shannon Williams; Michael August; Toby Laing	4:47
2.	"Turn It Around"	Barnaby Weir	4:33
3.	"Bring You Up"	Williams; August; Bret McKenzie	5:57
4.	"Sort It Out"	Weir; Laing; McKenzie; Daniel Weetman	3:35
5.	"So True"	Weir; Laing; August	3:54
6.	"Fire"	McKenzie; Weir; Laing	4:57
7.	"Let's Get Down"	Weir; Weetman	3:29
8.	"Shazzy Dub" (instrumental)	Williams; Weir; Laing; Rich Christie; Daniel Yeabsley	5:28
9.	"You Get Me"	Weir; Williams; Weetman; August; Christie; McKenzie; Laing; Yeabsley	4:56
10.	"Senegal Champions of Africa" (instrumental)	McKenzie; Weir; Laing	5:28
11.	"On the Sun"	Christie; McKenzie; August	7:09
Total length:			54:13

== Personnel ==
Personnel as listed in the album's liner notes are:

=== The Black Seeds ===
- Barnaby Weir – vocals, guitars, production; bass guitar (2, 7), Rhodes piano and drums (7)
- Daniel Weetman – congas, woodblock, tambourine, claves; pump organ (7), vocals (3, 4, 6, 9)
- Bret McKenzie – piano, Rhodes piano, Clavinet, Hammond organ, Farfisa organ, Roland SH-101 synthesizer; drums (2, 8), tom drums and cymbals (3), backing vocals (6, 9)
- Mike Fabulous – guitars, tambourine, shakers, cabassa; bass guitar (4), drums and SH-101 (3), Rhodes piano (5), effects (11)
- Rich Christie – drums; backing vocals (6)
- Shannon Williams – bass guitar; Casio drums (3), backing vocals (6)

=== Additional musicians ===
- Joe Lindsay – trombone (1)
- Daniel Yeabsley – saxophone (1, 3–6, 8–10)
- Toby Laing – trumpet (1, 4, 5, 8–10)
- Luke Buda – Prophet-5 synthesizer (1, 8, 11)
- Alexis French – trumpet (3, 6)
- Damien Forlong – trombone (3, 6)
- Hollie Smith – vocals (6)
- Nick van Dijk – trombone (6)
- Chris O'Connor – cowbell, congas (10)
- Darryn Sigley – cabassa, shekere, timbales (10)
- Nils Olsen – saxophone (10)

=== Production ===
- Lee Prebble – production, recording, mixing, effects
- Mike Gibson – recording (1)
- Don Bartley – mastering
- George Clarke – cover artwork

== Charts ==
=== Weekly charts ===
Chart (2004)	Peak position
New Zealand Albums (RMNZ)	3

=== Year-end charts ===
Chart (2004)	Position
New Zealand Albums (RMNZ)	34

== Certifications ==
Certifications for On the Sun
Region	Certification	Certified units/sales
New Zealand (RMNZ)	3× Platinum	45,000^{‡}
^{‡} Sales+streaming figures based on certification alone.
