= Try to Remember Everything =

Compilation album by Bic Runga
- Released: 21 November 2008
- Recorded: 1996–2008
- Genres: Pop, alternative rock
- Length: 42:49
- Label: Sony Music New Zealand

Bic Runga chronology
Birds (2005)	Try to Remember Everything (2008)	Belle (2011)

Try to Remember Everything is a compilation album by New Zealand singer-songwriter Bic Runga. The album is collection of unreleased, new and rare Bic Runga recordings from 1996 to 2008. The album was released on 21 November 2008 and was certified gold in December.

== Track listing ==
CD/ DD (Sony Music – 88697431822)

1. "All Fall Down" (Outtake) (Bic Runga)
2. "The Daily Grind" (Demo) (Bic Runga)
3. "Blue Blue Heart" (Demo) (Bic Runga)
4. "Gracie" (Outtake) (Bic Runga)
5. "A Day Like Today" (Outtake) (Bic Runga)
6. "Strangers Again" (Recorded For Radio New Zealand)
7. "Autumn Leaves" (Outtake) (Joseph Kosma)
8. "Something's Gotten Hold of My Heart" (Outtake) (Roger Greenaway / Roger Cook)
9. "Dust" (Recorded For Radio New Zealand) (Bic Runga)
10. "Drive" (Live) (Bic Runga)
11. "Everyone Must Love" (Messer / Bic Runga)
12. "Gravity" (Live on KCRW) (Bic Runga)
13. "Sway" (Live on KCRW) (Bic Runga)
14. "Close the Door Put Out the Light" (Recorded For Radio New Zealand) (Bic Runga)

== Weekly charts ==
Chart (2008)	Peak position
New Zealand Albums (RMNZ)	28
