= Sorry (Bic Runga song) =

Single by Bic Runga

from the album Drive
- Released: 1999 (Australia)
- Genre: Pop
- Length: 3:23
- Label: Columbia

Bic Runga singles chronology
| "Good Morning Baby" (1999) | "Sorry" (1999) | "Drive" (2000) |

"Sorry" is a song by New Zealand recording artist Bic Runga. The single was released in Australia and Germany only as the final single from her debut studio album, Drive (1997).

== Track listing ==
Australian CD single (Columbia – 666639.2)

1. "Sorry" – 3:23
2. "Dust" – 2:09
3. "Close the Door Put Out the Light" – 2:37
