= Roll into One =

Single by Bic Runga

from the album Drive
- Released: 1997 (New Zealand)
- Length: 3:20
- Label: Columbia
- Songwriter: Bic Runga
- Producer: Bic Runga

Bic Runga singles chronology
"Suddenly Strange" (1997)	"Roll into One" (1997)	"Hey" (1998)

"Roll into One" is a song by New Zealand recording artist, Bic Runga. The song was released in December 1997 as the fourth single from her debut studio album, Drive (1997)

== Track listing ==
1. "Roll into One" - 3:20
2. "Drive" (Doordarshan mix) - 6:25
3. "Drive" (Interstellar over Drive mix) - 7:16

== Personnel ==
Personnel adapted from the liner notes of Drive.

- Bic Runga – vocals, arrangements, guitars, production
- Peter Asher – backing vocals
- Wayne Bell – drums
- Aaron McDonald – bass
- Boh Runga – backing vocals
- Simon Sheridan – engineering
- Matt Tait – engineering assistance
- Andrew Thorne – backing vocals, guitars
- Matt Wallace – backing vocals, guitar, mastering, mixing

== Chart positions ==
Chart (1997)	Peak position
New Zealand (Recorded Music NZ)	48
