= Suddenly Strange =

Single by Bic Runga

from the album Drive
- Released: September 1997 (NZ)
- Genre: Rock, pop
- Length: 4:20
- Label: Columbia
- Songwriter: Bic Runga
- Producer: Bic Runga

Bic Runga singles chronology
"Sway" (1997)	"Suddenly Strange" (1997)	"Roll into One" (1997)

"Suddenly Strange" is a song by New Zealand recording artist, Bic Runga. The song was released in September 1997 as the third single from her debut studio album Drive.

== Track listing (New Zealand) ==
New Zealand CD single (Columbia – 664940.2)

1. "Suddenly Strange"
2. "All Fall Down"
3. "Welcome to My Kitchen"

Australian CD single (Columbia – 666689.2)

1. "Suddenly Strange" - 4:20
2. "Welcome To My Kitchen" - 4:02
3. "Ordinary Girl" - 2:40

== Personnel ==
Personnel adapted from the liner notes of Drive.

- Bic Runga – vocals, arrangements, backing vocals, guitar, Mellotron, production
- Tom Banghart – engineering assistance
- Sally-Anne Brown – cello
- Davey Fargher – bass
- Josh Freese – drums
- Duncan Haynes – string arrangement
- Niall Macken – additional arrangement
- Nick Seymour – additional arrangement
- Simon Sheridan – engineering
- Matt Tait – engineering assistance
- Matt Wallace – percussion, engineering, mastering, mixing
- Kate Walshe – violin

== Weekly charts ==
Chart (1997)	Peak position
New Zealand (Recorded Music NZ)	26
