= Drive (Bic Runga EP) =

EP by Bic Runga
- Released: 1995 (New Zealand)
- Recorded: 1995
- Genre: Rock, pop
- Label: Epic
- Producer: Wayne Bell, Nigel Stone

Bic Runga chronology
| Drive (1995) | Drive (1997) |

Drive is the debut extended play by New Zealand musician Bic Runga, released in New Zealand in 1995.

== Track listing ==
1. "Drive" (Bic Runga) – 3:01
2. "You" (Runga, Kelly Horgan) – 4:26
3. "Take It Out Sometimes" (Runga) – 3:06
4. "Ordinary Girl" (Runga) – 2:41
5. "Swim" (Runga) – 2:56

== Chart positions ==
| Chart (1995–1996) | Peak position |
|---|---|
| New Zealand (Recorded Music NZ) | 10 |
