= Dust and Dirt =

Studio album by The Black Seeds
- Released: 8 April 2012
- Recorded: Wellington, New Zealand
- Genres: Reggae, dub
- Length: 55:37
- Label: Easy Star Records
- Producer: The Black Seeds

The Black Seeds chronology
Solid Ground (2008)	Dust and Dirt (2012)

Singles from Dust and Dirt
- 1. "Pippy Pip" Released: 28 February 2012

Dust and Dirt is the fifth studio album by New Zealand reggae band The Black Seeds released on 8 April 2012. The album's first single, "Pippy Pip" was released on 28 February 2012. Dust and Dirt was self-recorded and produced by The Black Seeds in their Wellington studio and released on digital, CD, and limited edition heavy weight 12" double gatefold vinyl formats.

== Track listing ==
1. "Out of Light" - 4:02
2. "Dust and Dirt" - 4:43
3. "Pippy Pip" - 3:42
4. "Wide Open" - 5:27
5. "The Bend" - 4:55
6. "Loose Cartilage" - 4:14
7. "Frostbite" - 4:58
8. "Gabriel's Strut Dub" - 3:04
9. "Love Me Now" - 3:57
10. "Cracks in Our Crown" - 3:43
11. "Don't Turn Around" - 4:21
12. "Settle Down" - 4:22
13. "Rusted Story" - 4:10
14. "Settle Dub" (Bonus Digital Track) - 4:19

== Release history ==
Region	Date	Label
New Zealand	9 April 2012	Remote Control Records
North America	10 April 2012	Easy Star Records
Australia, Germany	13 April 2012	Remote Control Records (Aus)
Worldwide	16 April 2012	Proville (UK)
