= Sway (Bic Runga song) =

1997 single by Bic Runga

- New Zealand CD artwork

Single by Bic Runga

from the album Drive
- B-side: "I Don't Mean It"; "Lonely Lola Cherry Cola Girl"
- Released: 1997
- Studio: Revolver (Auckland, New Zealand)
- Length: 4:24
- Label: Columbia
- Songwriter: Bic Runga
- Producer: Bic Runga

Bic Runga singles chronology
"Bursting Through" (1996)	"Sway" (1997)	"Suddenly Strange" (1997)

Alternative cover
- UK CD artwork (1997)

Audio
- "Sway" on YouTube

"Sway" is a song by New Zealand singer Bic Runga. It was released as the second single from her debut studio album, Drive (1997), in 1997. The song peaked at No. 7 in New Zealand and No. 10 in Australia. At the 32nd New Zealand Music Awards, the song won three awards: Single of the Year, Best Songwriter, and Best Engineer (Simon Sheridan). In 2001, it was voted the sixth-best New Zealand song of all time by members of the Australasian Performing Right Association (APRA). A music video directed by John Taft was made for the song.

An acoustic version of the song can be found on the charity album Even Better Than the Real Thing Vol. 2. In September 2019, Runga re-recorded the song for Waiata / Anthems, a collection of re-recorded New Zealand pop songs to promote te Wiki o te Reo Māori (Māori Language Week). The new version, retitled "Haere Mai Rā / Sway", featured lyrics reinterpreted by scholar Tīmoti Kāretu.

In June 2022, R3hab and Amy Shark released a cover titled "Sway My Way".

== Background ==
Bic Runga wrote the song in Ireland. While she was on her way to the airport before her trip, she saw a bridge with graffiti on it. One of the words painted on the bridge was "sway". Although Runga did not understand the circumstances in which this word appeared on the bridge, she decided to give her next song the same title.

== Commercial performance ==
In New Zealand, "Sway" debuted at number 28 on the RIANZ Singles Chart, then climbed into the top 10 five weeks later, eventually peaking at number seven on 13 July 1997. The song spent a total of 17 weeks on the chart and left the top 50 on 14 September 1997. "Sway" was certified platinum in New Zealand with 30,000 sales and streaming units. In Australia, "Sway" debuted on the ARIA Singles Chart at number 42, peaked at number 10, and spent a total of 22 weeks on the chart. The Australian Recording Industry Association (ARIA) certified the song gold, denoting shipments of 35,000 units. In 2004, the single charted in Ireland and the United Kingdom. In the former country, the song first appeared on the Irish Singles Chart on 16 September 2004 and peaked at number 26. In the United Kingdom, "Sway" stayed on the UK Singles Chart for a single week, peaking at number 83.

== Track listings ==
New Zealand CD and cassette single

1. "Sway" – 4:14
2. "I Don't Mean It" – 3:18
3. "Lonely Lola Cherry Cola Girl" – 3:56

Australian CD single

1. "Sway"
2. "Dust"
3. "Close the Door, Put Out the Light"

UK CD single

1. "Sway" – 4:22
2. "Welcome to My Kitchen" – 4:01
3. "Close the Door, Put Out the Light" – 2:37

Irish CD single

1. "Sway" – 4:22
2. "She Left on a Monday" – 4:45

== Credits and personnel ==
Credits are lifted from the Drive album booklet.

Studios

- Recorded at Revolver Studios (Auckland, New Zealand)
- Mixed at Brooklyn Recording Studios (Los Angeles)
- Mastered at A&M Mastering (Los Angeles)

Personnel

- Bic Runga – writing, vocals, backing vocals, xylophone, production, arrangement
- Gary Verberne – guitars
- Andrew Thorne – guitars
- Aaron McDonald – bass
- Wayne Bell – drums
- Kate Walshe – violin
- Sally-Anne Brown – cello
- Duncan Haynes – string arrangement
- Matt Wallace – mixing, mastering
- Tom Banghart – mixing assistance
- Simon Sheridan – engineering
- Matt Tait – engineering assistance

== Charts ==
=== Weekly charts ===
Weekly chart performance for "Sway"
Chart (1997–2004)	Peak position
Australia (ARIA)	10
Ireland (IRMA)	26
New Zealand (Recorded Music NZ)	7
Scottish Singles Sales (Official Charts)	75
UK Singles (Official Charts)	83

=== Year-end charts ===
Year-end chart performance for "Sway"
Chart (1997)	Position
New Zealand (RIANZ)	29
Chart (1998)	Position
Australia (ARIA)	58

== Certifications ==
Certifications for "Sway"
Region	Certification	Certified units/sales
Australia (ARIA)	Gold	35,000^{^}
New Zealand (RMNZ)	Platinum	30,000^{‡}
^{^} Shipments figures based on certification alone.^{‡} Sales+streaming figures based on certification alone.

== Release history ==
Release history and formats for "Sway"
Region	Date	Format(s)	Label(s)	Ref.
New Zealand	1997	CD; cassette	Columbia	
United States	February 1998	Radio	Columbia	
United Kingdom	31 August 1998	CD; cassette	Epic	

== "Sway My Way" ==
"Sway My Way"

Single by R3hab and Amy Shark
- Released: 10 June 2022
- Length: 2:16
- Label: Cyb3rpvnk

R3hab singles chronology
"Saved My Life" (2022)	"Sway My Way" (2022)	"Worlds on Fire" (2022)

Amy Shark singles chronology
"Sugar, We're Goin Down" (2022)	"Sway My Way" (2022)	"Only Wanna Be with You" (2022)

In June 2022, Dutch producer R3hab and Australian singer Amy Shark released a version titled "Sway My Way". It peaked at number 25 on the ARIA Singles Chart and was certified gold.

Speaking about the recording, R3hab said "Every record reveals a new facet of the artist behind it, 'Sway My Way' might surprise some listeners, as it's got a more organic and stripped-back feel than many of my singles, but I love the dynamic it brings. Amy is an incredible artist and a pleasure to work with, and I'm so glad she helped me bring this song to life." Shark said, "I grew up loving Bic Runga, and her song 'Sway' was one that I loved so much. When R3hab asked me to join him and put my spin on the song, I jumped at it."

"Sway My Way" won 'Highest Selling Single' at the 2023 Queensland Music Awards.

At the 2023 ARIA Music Awards, the song was nominated for Song of the Year.

=== Reception ===
Conor Lochrie from Rolling Stone Australia felt that "The pair dovetail well on the collaboration, with Shark's emotive vocals paying homage to the original over R3HAb's laidback electronic instrumental."

=== Track listing ===
1. "Sway My Way" – 2:16
2. "Sway My Way" (Karim Nass remix) – 2:18

=== Charts ===
Weekly chart performance for "Sway My Way"
Chart (2022)	Peak position
Australia (ARIA)	25
US Hot Dance/Electronic Songs (Billboard)	50

=== Certifications ===
Certifications for "Sway My Way"
Region	Certification	Certified units/sales
Australia (ARIA)	Platinum	70,000^{‡}
^{‡} Sales+streaming figures based on certification alone.
