= Belle (album) =

Studio album by Bic Runga
- Released: 14 November 2011 (New Zealand); 11 November 2011 (Republic of Ireland); 24 November 2011 (Australia)
- Genres: Pop, alternative rock
- Length: 32:29
- Labels: Sony Music New Zealand; Sony Music Ireland
- Producer: Kody Nielson

Bic Runga chronology
Try to Remember Everything (2008)	Belle (2011)	Anthology (2012)

Belle is the fourth studio album by New Zealand singer-songwriter Bic Runga.

The album was released in New Zealand on 14 November 2011, while in Ireland the album was released earlier on 11 November 2011 under Sony Music Ireland.

It was her first studio album in six years and the first to feature a producer, Kody Nielson and material co-written with other songwriters. The album's title is derived from the theme song of the French television series Belle et Sébastien which Runga also covers on the album.

== Singles ==
The first single from the album is "Hello Hello". The track debuted on New Zealand radio stations in September 2011. On 8 September 2011 for a limited time only Bandit.fm allowed fans the chance to download the song for free. On 12 September 2011, "Hello Hello" was made available to purchase from digital music stores in New Zealand. "Tiny Little Piece of My Heart" and "If You Really Do" were released as follow-up singles in 2012.

== Track listing ==
1. "Tiny Little Piece of My Heart" (Ruban Nielson, Kody Nielson, Bic Runga) – 2:16
2. "Hello Hello" (Bic Runga, Dann Hume) – 3:05
3. "If You Really Do" (Bic Runga) – 3:55
4. "This Girl's Prepared for War" (Bic Runga, James Milne) – 4:29
5. "Everything Is Beautiful and New" (Bic Runga) – 2:59
6. "Good Love" (Bic Runga, Dann Hume) – 3:27
7. "Devil on Tambourine" (Bic Runga, Kody Nielson) – 3:21
8. "Belle" (Cécile Aubry, Tutti) – 1:56
9. "Darkness All Around Us" (Kody Nielson) – 3:14
10. "Music and Light" (Bic Runga) – 3:38

== Personnel ==
Personnel adapted from the album's liner notes.

=== Musicians ===
- Bic Runga – lead vocals (all tracks), backing vocals (3), piano (10)
- Tim Arnold – guitar (3, 4), acoustic guitar (5)
- Jon Brion – acoustic guitar (2), floor tom (2), CS-80 (3–6, 9, 10)
- Claire Cowan – string arrangement (2)
- Natalia Mann – harp (8)
- Andrew McDowall – string arrangement (2)
- Kody Nielson – bass (1, 3, 6, 8, 9), drums (1, 2, 4, 6, 7, 9, 10), keyboards (1–7, 9), percussion (1–4, 7, 10), vocoder (1, 4), backing vocals (2, 3, 6), vocals (7, 9), celeste (10)
- Chris Nielson – flugelhorn (1, 5), saxophone (1), trumpet (1, 4), flute (5), bass clarinet (9)
- Ruban Nielson – bass (1), guitar (4, 6, 7)
- Sebastian Steinberg – bass (2, 4, 7, 10)
- Joey Waronker – drums (3)

=== Technical ===
- Chris Athens – mastering (all tracks)
- Reuben De La Tour – engineering
- Justin Gerrish – mixing (4, 6, 8–10)
- Greg Junovich – engineering
- Rouble Kapoor – engineering assistance
- Greg Koller – engineering
- Kody Nielson – engineering; mixing (3, 5, 7), production (all tracks)
- John Paterno – engineering
- Bret Rausch – misc. assistance
- Tom Rothrock – mixing (1, 2), vocal production (all tracks)
- Andre Upston – engineering

=== Design ===
- Serenity Anderson – makeup
- Nirrimi Firebrace – photography
- Amanda Gaskin – artwork concept and design
- Karen Inderbitzen-Waller – styling
- Gideon Keith – artwork concept and design
- Lucy Marr – hairstyling
- Avril Planqueel – styling

== Weekly charts ==
Chart (2011/12)	Peak position
New Zealand Albums (RMNZ)	5

== Tour ==
First leg
2011 Classic Hits Acoustic Church Tour

- 17 November – Whangārei Central Baptist Church
- 18 November – Tauranga Holy Trinity
- 19 November – Hamilton Chapel of Christ the King
- 21 November – Pukekohe Franklin Baptist Church
- 22 & 23 November – Auckland Holy Trinity Cathedral
- 25 November – Napier St John's Cathedral
- 26 November – Palmerston North All Saints Church
- 28 November – Masterton St Matthew's Anglican Church
- 29 & 30 November – Wellington Cathedral
- 2 & 3 December – Christchurch St Michael & All Angels
- 5 December – Timaru St Mary's Church
- 6 & 7 December – Dunedin Knox Church
- 8 December – Invercargill First Presbyterian Church

Second leg
2012 international tour dates – Ireland, UK and Australia

- 15 April – CORK, The Opera House, Republic of Ireland
- 17 April – DUBLIN, Olympia Theatre, Republic of Ireland
- 18 April – LONDON, O_{2} Shepherd's Bush Empire, United Kingdom
- 1 May – KANGAROO GROUND, Wellers Restaurant, Australia
- 2 May – GEELONG, GPAC Drama Theatre, Australia
- 4 May – MELBOURNE, Athenaeum Theatre, Australia
- 5 May – BRISBANE, Powerhouse Theatre, Australia
- 6 May – BANGALOW, A&I Hall, Australia
- 8 May – CENTRAL COAST, Lizottes, Australia
- 9 May – NEWCASTLE, Lizottes, Australia
- 11 May – WOLLONGONG – IPAC, Gordon Theatre, Australia
- 12 May – SYDNEY, City Recital Hall, Australia
- 13 May – CANBERRA, Street Theatre, Australia
