= Winning Arrow =

Single by Bic Runga

from the album Birds
- Released: 28 November 2005
- Recorded: 2005
- Genre: Folk; Pop
- Label: Columbia
- Songwriter(s): Bic Runga

Bic Runga singles chronology
"Listening for the Weather" (2003)	"Winning Arrow" (2005)	"That's Alright" (2005)

"Winning Arrow" is a song by New Zealand singer-songwriter Bic Runga. It was released in November 2005 as the first single from her third studio album, Birds (2005).

== Track listing ==
Vinyl (82876764811)

- A1. "Winning Arrow"
- A2. "Say After Me"
- B1. "Birds"
- B2. "Somewhere in the Night"

== Charts ==
Chart (2005–06)	Peak position
New Zealand (Recorded Music NZ)	23
