= Something Good (Bic Runga song) =

2002 single by Bic Runga

Single by Bic Runga

from the album Beautiful Collision
- B-side: "A Day Like Today"
- Released: 25 November 2002
- Length: 3:19
- Label: Columbia
- Songwriter: Bic Runga
- Producer: Bic Runga

Bic Runga singles chronology
"Get Some Sleep" (2002)	"Something Good" (2002)	"Listening for the Weather" (2003)

Alternative cover
- UK cover

"Something Good" is a song written, produced, and performed by New Zealand singer Bic Runga. The song was released in New Zealand in 2002 and reached number four on the RIANZ Singles Chart. In 2003, "Something Good" received the Best Solo Video award from Juice TV. On 21 June 2004, the song was released in the United Kingdom as a maxi-CD single but failed to chart.

== Track listings ==
New Zealand CD single

1. "Something Good"
2. "A Day Like Today"
3. "Something Good" (Submariner mix featuring Tha Feelstyle)

UK maxi-CD single

1. "Something Good"
2. "Get Some Sleep" (BBC live version)
3. "Wishing on a Star" (CSO live version)
4. "Something Good" (video)

== Personnel ==
Personnel are adapted from the liner notes of Beautiful Collision.

- Bic Runga – vocals, arrangements, Dobro, drums, twelve-string electric guitar, production
- Milan Borich – vocals
- Michael Brauer – mixing
- Greg Calbi – mastering
- Ricardo Chavarria – mixing assistance
- Dave Dobbyn – electric guitar
- Neil Finn – vocals
- Duncan Haynes – string arrangement
- Sebastian Steinberg – bass

== Charts ==
Chart (2002)	Peak position
New Zealand (Recorded Music NZ)	4

== Certifications ==
Region	Certification	Certified units/sales
New Zealand (RMNZ)	Gold	15,000^{‡}
^{‡} Sales+streaming figures based on certification alone.

== Release history ==
Region	Date	Format	Label	Ref.
New Zealand	25 November 2002	CD	Columbia	
Australia	17 December 2002	CD	Columbia	
United Kingdom	21 June 2004	Maxi-CD	Columbia	
