= Beautiful Collision =

Studio album by Bic Runga
- Released: 1 July 2002
- Studios: Revolver; Runga's home; York Street (Auckland); Blast (Christchurch); Sunset Sound (Los Angeles); Good and Evil; Quad (New York City); Marmalade (Wellington)
- Genres: Pop, rock
- Length: 39:49
- Label: Columbia
- Producer: Bic Runga

Bic Runga chronology
Together in Concert: Live (2000)	Beautiful Collision (2002)	Live in Concert with the Christchurch Symphony (2003)

Singles from Beautiful Collision
- 1. "Get Some Sleep" Released: 17 June 2002; 2. "Something Good" Released: October 2002; 3. "Listening for the Weather" Released: 7 April 2003

Beautiful Collision is the second solo album by New Zealand artist Bic Runga, released on 1 July 2002 in New Zealand, 15 July 2002 in Australia, and 5 November 2002 in the United States.

== Critical reception ==
Professional ratings
Review scores
Source	Rating
AllMusic	4.5/5 stars
The New Zealand Herald	4/5 stars

Ken Goldstein of PopMatters gave the album a positive review, as did Emma Phillpott from NZ Musician.

At the 2003 New Zealand Music Awards, Beautiful Collision was nominated for Album of the Year, Best Female Vocalist, Best Solo Artist and Producer of the Year. It lost Album of the Year to The Datsuns' self-titled album, but won the other three categories. At the awards ceremony, it was also announced as the highest-selling New Zealand album for the year of 2003. Additionally, "Get Some Sleep" was nominated for the award for Single of the Year, but was beaten by Goodshirt's song "Sophie".

== Commercial performance ==
Beautiful Collision debuted at number one on the New Zealand Albums Chart on 14 July 2002. It spent an additional seven non-consecutive weeks at number one in June and July 2003. Beautiful Collision lasted a total of 101 non-consecutive weeks on the New Zealand Albums Chart; its last appearance was on 11 October 2004. It was ranked as the eighth best-selling album in New Zealand in 2002, and the best-selling album in 2003. Beautiful Collision was certified 11-times platinum by the Recording Industry Association of New Zealand, denoting shipment of 165,000 copies. The album spent one week on the Australian Albums Chart in August 2002, at number forty-one. Beautiful Collision peaked at number fifty-five on the UK Albums Chart, and lasted two weeks on the chart.

== Track listing ==
Track listing adapted from Spotify and CD liner notes. All tracks are written and produced by Bic Runga.

No.	Title	Length
1.	"When I See You Smile"	1:44
2.	"Get Some Sleep"	3:33
3.	"Something Good"	3:17
4.	"Precious Things"	3:52
5.	"The Be All and End All"	3:19
6.	"Election Night"	3:03
7.	"Honest Goodbyes"	3:56
8.	"She Left on a Monday"	3:55
9.	"Beautiful Collision"	3:44
10.	"Listening for the Weather"	3:27
11.	"Counting the Days"	2:14
12.	"Gravity"	3:39
Total length:		39:49

== Personnel ==
Credits adapted from CD liner notes.

Musicians

- Bic Runga – vocals (all tracks), acoustic guitar (tracks 5, 8), arrangements (all tracks), dobro (tracks 3, 11), drums (tracks 3, 11), drum samples (track 6), electric guitar (tracks 6, 8, 11), guitar (tracks 1, 7), harmonica (track 10), piano (tracks 4, 6–9, 12), string arrangement (track 9), twelve-string electric guitar (track 3), Wurlitzer piano (tracks 4, 10)
- Tim Arnold – twelve-string acoustic guitar (track 2), vocals (track 2)
- Milan Borich – twelve-string acoustic guitar (track 2), vocals (tracks 2, 3, 10)
- Danny Blume – tenor guitar (track 4)
- Stu Buchanan – clarinet (track 11)
- Dave Dobbyn – acoustic guitar (track 2), electric guitar (tracks 2, 3)
- Neil Finn – piano (track 5), vocals (tracks 3, 5, 10), Wurlitzer (track 5)
- Jay Foulkes – percussion (track 9), tambourine (tracks 2, 8, 10)
- Alan Gregg – bass (tracks 4, 9, 12), electric bass (track 6)
- Bob Heinz – banjo (tracks 5, 11), guitar (track 7)
- Harry Harrison – slide guitar (track 8)
- Duncan Haynes – string arrangements (tracks 3, 7, 9)
- Josh Hodgson – acoustic guitar (track 5)
- Ben King – vocals (track 2)
- Geoff Maddock – electric guitar (tracks 6, 10), twelve-string acoustic guitar (track 12), twelve-string electric guitar (track 12)
- Andy Morton – drum programming (track 6), keyboards (track 9), kung fu samples (track 4), synth bass (track 9), programming (track 4)
- Lee Prebble – additional editing (track 6)
- Boh Runga – electric guitar (track 6), vocals (track 8), vocal guidance/direction (tracks 2, 8, 9)
- Pearl Runga – vocals (track 8), vocal guidance/direction (track 8)
- Sophia Runga – vocal guidance/direction (track 8)
- Sebastian Steinberg – bass (tracks 2, 3, 8, 10, 11), tenor guitar (track 4), upright bass (tracks 5–7)
- Luke Tomes – drum programming (tracks 4, 6, 12), gong (track 4)
- Darryl Ward – hi-hat overdubs (track 6)
- Joey Waronker – drums (tracks 2, 7–10), drum sounds (tracks 4, 12)

Technical

- Bic Runga – production (all tracks)
- Nick Abbott – engineering
- Neil Baldock – engineering
- Danny Blume – engineering
- Michael Brauer – mixing (all tracks)
- Greg Calbi – mastering (all tracks)
- Ricardo Chavarria – mixing assistance (all tracks)
- Reuben Douglas – engineering assistance
- Andy Fox-Hulme – engineering
- Sam Gibson – engineering
- Josh Hodgson – engineering assistance
- Ben Holt – engineering
- Chris Kelly – engineering
- Nick Manders – engineering
- Andy Morton – engineering
- Clint Murphy – engineering
- John Paterno – engineering
- Luke Tomes – engineering

== Charts ==
=== Weekly charts ===
Chart (2002–2004)	Peak position
Australian Albums (ARIA)	41
Italian Albums (FIMI)	42
New Zealand Albums (RMNZ)	1
Scottish Albums (Official Charts)	66
UK Albums (Official Charts)	55

=== Year-end charts ===
Chart (2002)	Position
New Zealand Albums (RMNZ)	8

Chart (2003)	Position
New Zealand Albums (RMNZ)	1

Chart (2004)	Position
New Zealand Albums (RMNZ)	19

== See also ==
- List of number-one albums in 2002 (New Zealand)
- List of number-one albums in 2003 (New Zealand)
- List of number-one albums from the 2000s (New Zealand)
