= Bursting Through =

Single by Bic Runga

from the album Drive
- Released: September 1996 (New Zealand)
- Recorded: York Street Studios
- Genre: Rock, pop
- Label: Epic
- Songwriter: Bic Runga
- Producer: Bic Runga

Bic Runga singles chronology
"Bursting Through" (1996)	"Sway" (1997)

"Bursting Through" is a song by New Zealand artist Bic Runga, released in September 1996 as the first single from her debut studio album, Drive (1997).

In 2001, the song was voted 51st-best New Zealand song of all time by members of APRA.

== Track listing ==
1. "Bursting Through"
2. "Making a Scene"
3. "Bursting Through" (acoustic mix)

== Personnel ==
Personnel adapted from the liner notes of Drive.

- Bic Runga – vocals, arrangements, guitar, production
- Wayne Bell – drums, percussion
- Duncan Haynes – string arrangement
- Simon Sheridan – engineering
- Karl Steven – additional arrangement
- Matt Tait – engineering assistance
- Andrew Thorne – guitar
- Matt Wallace – mastering, mixing
- Kate Walshe – violin
- Sarah Yates – strings

== Chart positions ==
Chart (1996)	Peak position
New Zealand (Recorded Music NZ)	36
