= Drive (Bic Runga album) =

Studio album by Bic Runga
- Released: 14 July 1997 (New Zealand)
- Recorded: 1997
- Studio: Revolver, York Street (Auckland); Brooklyn (Los Angeles) (Note: All tracks except "Drive" – recorded at York Street – were recorded at Revolver. Parts of "Suddenly Strange" were also recorded at Brooklyn.)
- Genre: Rock, pop
- Length: 41:25
- Label: Columbia
- Producer: Bic Runga

Bic Runga chronology
Drive (1995)	Drive (1997)	Together in Concert: Live (2000)

Singles from Drive
- 1. "Bursting Through" Released: September 1996; 2. "Sway" Released: May 1997; 3. "Suddenly Strange" Released: September 1997; 4. "Roll into One" Released: December 1997; 5. "Hey" Released: 1998; 6. "Sorry" Released: 1999

Professional ratings
Review scores
Source	Rating
The Age	3/5 stars
AllMusic	4.5/5 stars
Birmingham Mail	(favorable)
Entertainment Weekly	B
Evening Post	4/5 stars
The Guardian	(favorable)
Guitar Player	(favorable)
Malay Mail	(mixed)
New Straits Times	(mixed)
Newcastle Herald	(favorable)
Sydney Morning Herald	4/5 stars
The Times	7/10 stars
Waikato Times	3/5 stars
Washington Post	(mixed)

Drive is the debut solo album by New Zealand artist Bic Runga, released on 14 July 1997. The album went seven times platinum in New Zealand, and won the New Zealand Music Award for Album of the Year at the 32nd New Zealand Music Awards.

== Track listing ==
Track listing adapted from Spotify and CD liner notes. All tracks are written and produced by Bic Runga.

No.	Title	Length
1.	"Drive"	2:46
2.	"Sway"	4:22
3.	"Hey"	3:15
4.	"Bursting Through"	3:42
5.	"Swim"	4:44
6.	"Roll into One"	3:19
7.	"Suddenly Strange"	4:19
8.	"Sorry"	3:22
9.	"Heal"	3:32
10.	"Delight"	4:00
11.	"Without You"	4:00
Total length:		41:25

== Personnel ==
Credits adapted from CD liner notes.

Musicians

- Bic Runga – lead vocals (all tracks), arrangements (all tracks), guitars (tracks 1, 4, 6, 7, 9), xylophone (tracks 2, 3, 11), Mellotron (track 7), drums (track 8), backing vocals (tracks 2, 3, 7, 11)
- Peter Asher – backing vocals (track 6)
- Wayne Bell – drums (tracks 2–6, 9–11), percussion (track 4)
- Sally-Anne Brown – cello (tracks 2, 7)
- Paul Casserly – samples (tracks 9, 10)
- Davey Faragher – bass guitar (track 7)
- Jay Foulkes – percussion (track 8)
- Josh Freese – drums (track 7)
- Duncan Haynes – Rhodes piano (track 10), string arrangements (tracks 2, 4, 7)
- Niall Macken – additional arrangement (tracks 2, 7, 11)
- Aaron McDonald – bass (tracks 2, 3, 5, 6, 8–11)
- Boh Runga – backing vocals (tracks 5, 6)
- Nick Seymour – additional arrangement (tracks 2, 7, 11)
- Malcolm Smith – keyboards (tracks 5, 9), additional samples (track 9)
- Karl Steven – additional arrangement (track 4)
- Andrew Thorne – guitars (tracks 2–6, 8–11), backing vocals (tracks 6, 11)
- Gary Verberne – guitars (tracks 2, 11)
- Kate Walshe – violin (tracks 2, 4, 7)
- Matt Wallace – guitar (track 6), percussion (track 7), backing vocals (track 6)
- Sarah Yates – strings (track 4)

Technical

- Bic Runga – production (all tracks), mixing (track 1)
- Tom Banghart – engineering assistance (track 7), mixing assistance (tracks 2–11)
- Chris van de Geer – engineering (track 1)
- Simon Sheridan – engineering (tracks 2–11)
- Matt Tait – engineering assistance (tracks 2–11)
- Matt Wallace – engineering (track 7), mastering (all tracks), mixing (tracks 2–11)

== Charts and certifications ==
=== Weekly charts ===
Chart (1997–1998)	Peak position
Australian Albums (ARIA)	50
New Zealand Albums (RMNZ)	1

=== Certifications ===
Region	Certification	Certified units/sales
New Zealand (RMNZ)	7× Platinum	105,000^{^}
^{^} Shipments figures based on certification alone.
