= The Black Seeds =

Band

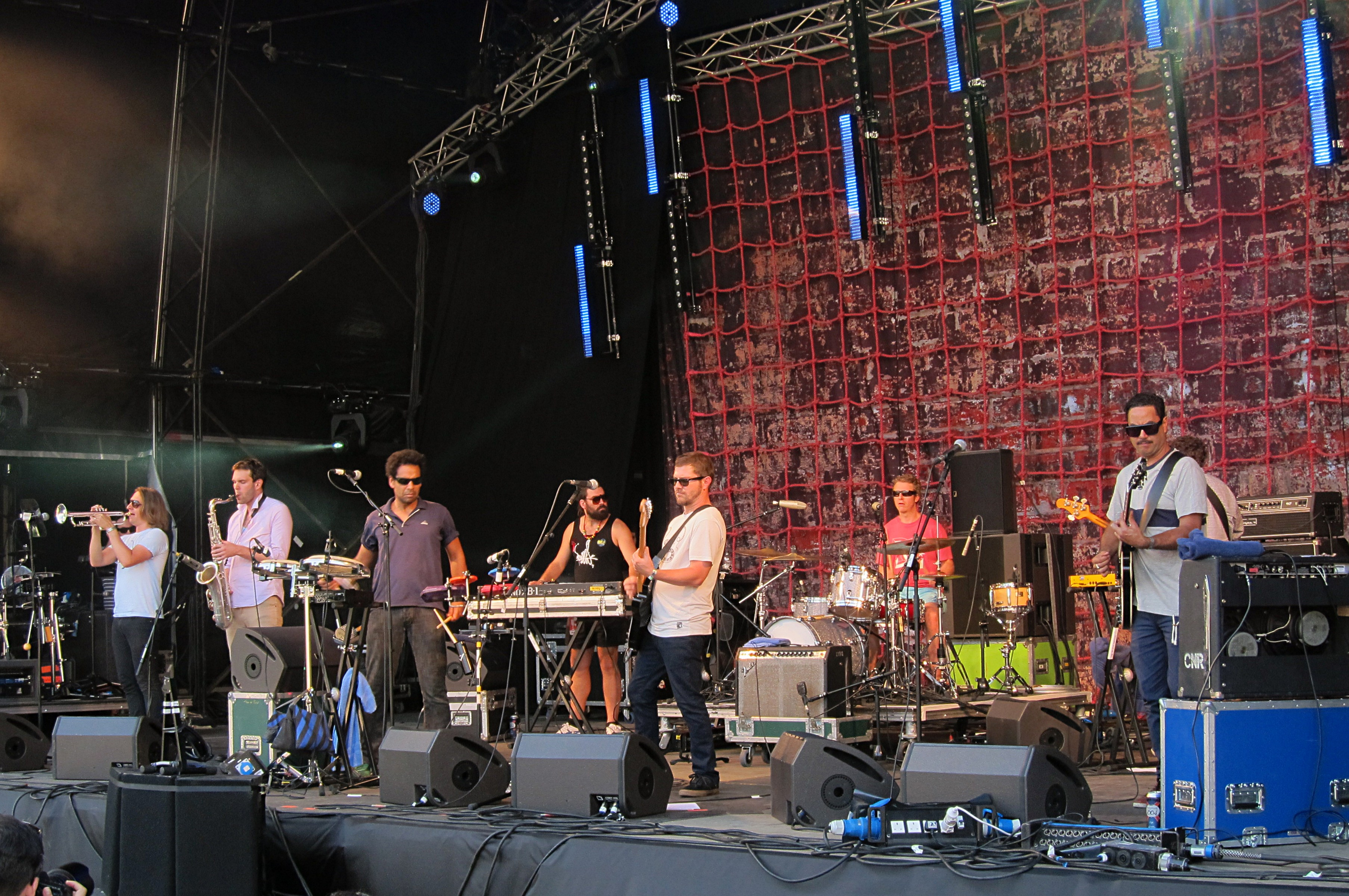
- Performing in Leicester, August 2012

Background information
- Origin: Wellington, New Zealand
- Genres: Reggae, roots reggae, funk, dub, rock, pop, soul, world music
- Years active: 1998–present
- Labels: Sonar Kollektiv, Easy Star Records, Loop, Capitol
- Members: Barnaby Weir; Daniel Weetman; Ryan Prebble; Jarney Murphy; Francis Harawira; Nigel Patterson; Barrett Hocking; Matthew Benton
- Past members: Mike Fabulous; Jabin Ward; Bret McKenzie; Rich Christie; Shannon Williams; Andrew Christiansen; Tim Jaray; Toby Laing; Ned Ngatae
- Website: www.theblackseeds.com

The Black Seeds are a reggae inspired musical group from Wellington, New Zealand. Their rocksteady song "One by One" became an international hit when it was played in top ranked TV series Breaking Bad. Their music is a mixture of big beat funk, dub, afro music, pop, rock, soul, and roots reggae/ragga.

Formed in 1998, the Black Seeds perform with eight members, with instruments including vocals, guitar, saxophone, trumpet, bass, drums, bongos, keyboard and wood block. Black Seeds first album, Keep On Pushing, was released 2001 following a number of live performances. Already very successful in New Zealand and popular in Australia, Europe and North & South America, their third album Into the Dojo (2007) introduced Black Seeds internationally. They have released seven studio albums, a live album, and two remix albums. They have two double-platinum selling albums in New Zealand, and successful European album releases through the German-based Sonar Kollektiv label. In 2011, the Black Seeds was described by Rolling Stone as "The best reggae band in the world right now".

Lead singer Barnaby Weir, the son of veteran radio broadcaster Dick Weir, is also associated with the side-projects Fly My Pretties and Flash Harry. Former band member Bret McKenzie is also a member of international comedy duo Flight of the Conchords, as well as playing the role of Figwit the elf in Peter Jackson's The Lord of the Rings.

The band released their sixth studio album Fabric in early September 2017.

Their song "One by One" was used in AMC's Breaking Bad Season 2 episode "4 Days Out" and also appears on the series' official soundtrack.

== Discography ==
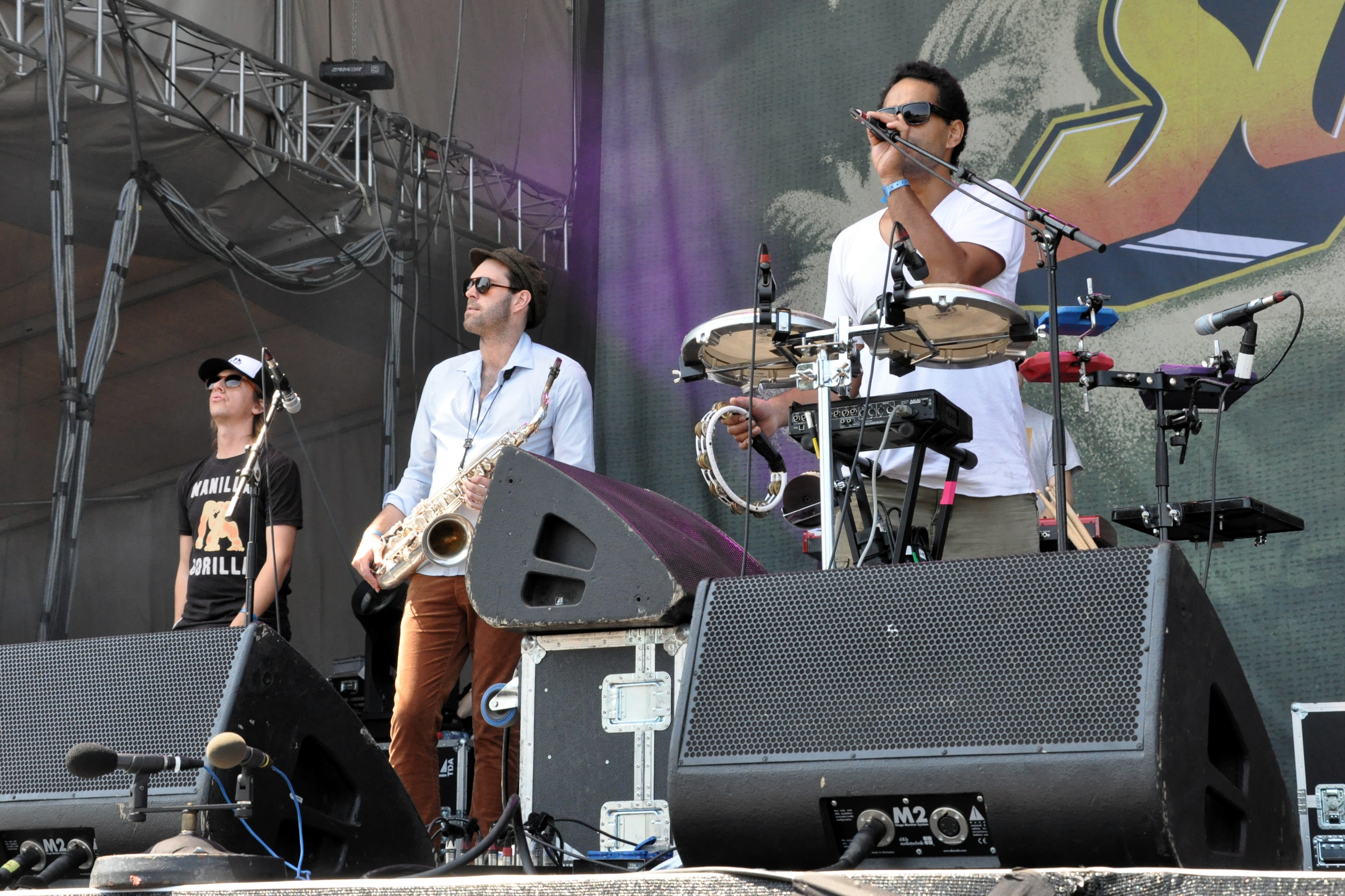
The Black Seeds at Summerjam 2013

- Keep On Pushing LP (2001)
- On the Sun (2004)
- Into the Dojo (2006)
- Solid Ground (2008)
- The Black Seeds Live – Vol 1 (2009)
- Specials: Remixes and Versions Off Solid Ground (2010)
- Dust and Dirt (2012)
- Fabric (2017)
- Love & Fire (2022)
