= Bic Runga =

New Zealand singer and songwriter

Bic Runga MNZM
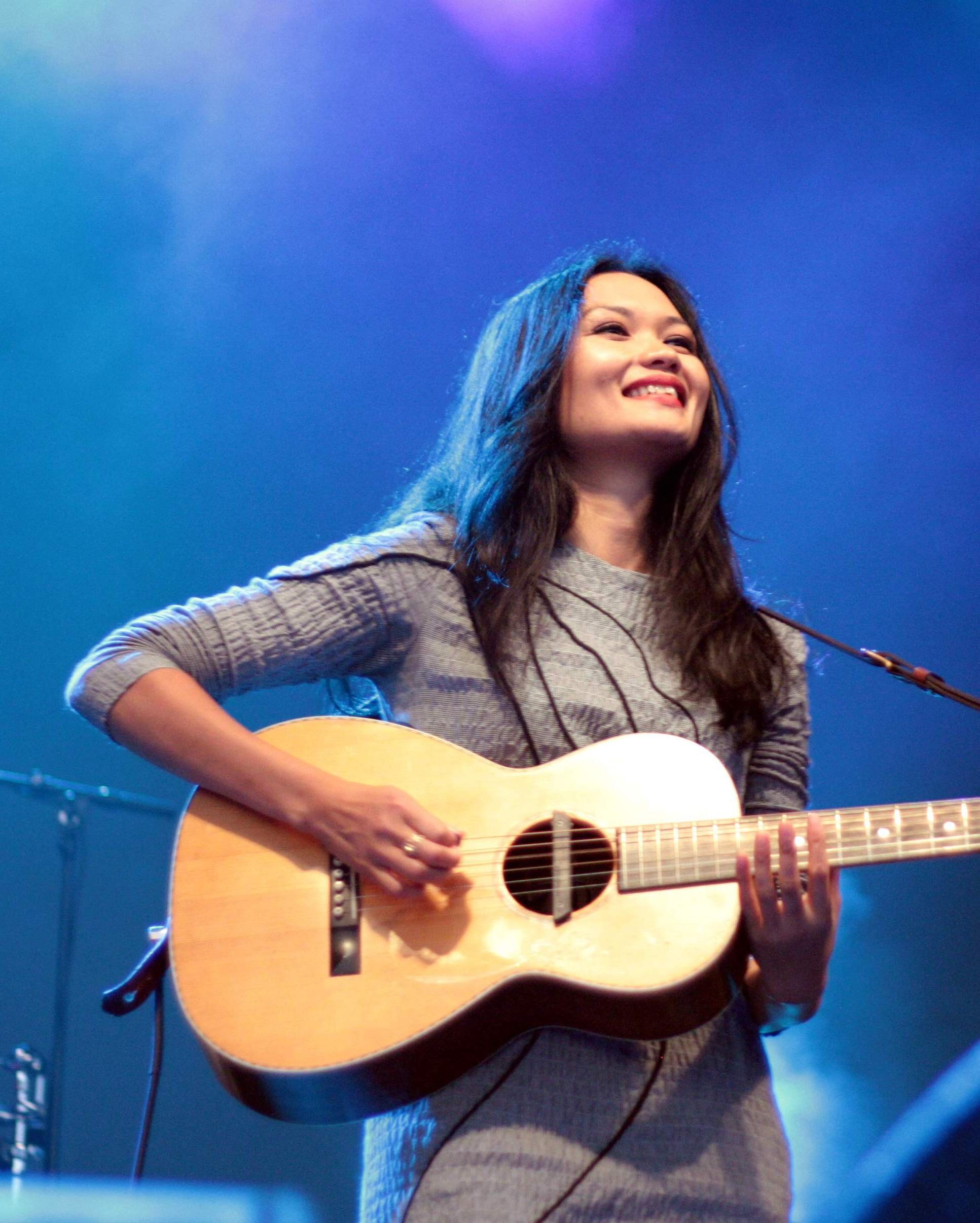
- Runga performing on the 2010 Winery Tour, in Auckland, New Zealand
- Born: Briolette Kah Bic Runga; 13 January 1976 (age 50); Christchurch, New Zealand
- Spouse: Kody Nielson
- Children: Three
- Relatives: Boh Runga (sister); Pearl Runga (sister)
- Musical career
- Genres: Pop rock, folk rock
- Instruments: Vocals, guitar, drums
- Years active: 1994–present
- Labels: Sony New Zealand, Columbia
- Website: bicrunga.com

Briolette Kah Bic Runga MNZM (born 13 January 1976), recording as Bic Runga, is a New Zealand singer-songwriter and multi-instrumentalist pop artist. Her first three studio albums debuted at number one on the New Zealand Top 40 Album charts. Runga has also found success internationally in Australia, Ireland and the United Kingdom with her 1997 song "Sway".

== Early life ==
Runga was born in Christchurch. Her mother, Sophia Tang, was a Chinese Malaysian lounge singer in Malaysia when she met Joseph Te Okoro Runga (died 2005), a Māori ex-serviceman and self-taught pianist. The couple moved to New Zealand to live. Runga is of Ngāti Kahungunu descent. Regarding her name, she explains: "You say it Bec, rather than Bic. ... It's Chinese, it's a strange vowel sound which doesn't seem to translate in Australia. It means the colour of jade, which might mean green."

Runga grew up in Hornby, Christchurch, surrounded by a musically inclined family, and started recording songs with her sisters, Boh (oldest) and Pearl, when she was four years old. Boh was the vocalist in the New Zealand rock group Stellar in the 1990s and 2000s, while Pearl is a session singer.

Runga learned how to play drums at the age of eleven, and guitar at about fourteen. She also learned to play the keyboard around this time to perform in jazz bands. She attended Cashmere High School, joining high school bands.

== Career ==
=== 1993–1997: Early career and Drive ===
Under the name Love Soup, Runga and Kelly Horgan entered the 1993 Smokefreerockquest in Christchurch, achieving third place and a music contract with Pagan Records. Using a QE II Arts Council grant, Runga recorded the first Drive EP in Wellington. Unsatisfied with the direction that her music was being taken, she moved to Auckland in 1994 and spent a year writing and performing in cafés.

In 1995, she sent a new demo of "Drive" to Sony Music, which signed Runga in September of that year and bought her Wellington recordings from Pagan Records. Sony had her re-record the song with more instruments, but it was eventually her demo that was used on the upcoming album. "Drive" is described as a "haunting pop ballad", which she wrote minutes before her first Auckland performance. It entered the Top 10 in New Zealand and won her the APRA Silver Scroll award in 1996.

Runga then released "Bursting Through", the first single from her upcoming album, also entitled Drive. The success of the singles led to the release of her debut album, Drive, in 1997. Runga's song "Sway", along with a duet with Dan Wilson of Semisonic called "Good Morning Baby", were used in the films American Pie, and Cruel Intentions. Six singles were released from the album, while "Sway" was released in New Zealand, Australia, the United Kingdom, and Germany.

Runga has recorded two songs called "Drive". The first was her own, which appeared on her debut album of the same name. The second was a 1999 collaboration with fellow New Zealanders Strawpeople, providing guest vocals for their cover of The Cars' classic 1984 hit.

=== 2000–2008: Beautiful Collision and Birds ===
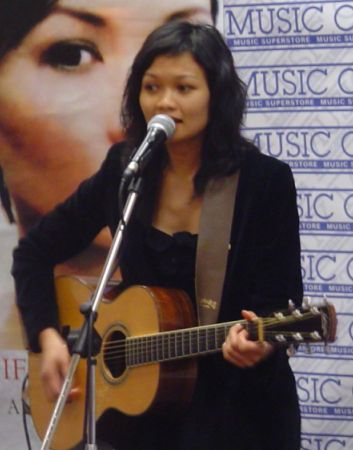
Runga performing in Dublin in 2004

In 2000, Runga toured with Tim Finn and Dave Dobbyn, resulting in a release of a live album in November 2000, titled Together in Concert: Live. It peaked at number 2 on the New Zealand charts and has been certified 3× platinum. Runga released her second solo album, Beautiful Collision in 2002. It entered the New Zealand charts at number one and has been certified 10× platinum in New Zealand.

Her third studio album, Birds, was released in New Zealand on 28 November 2005. New Zealand artists Neil Finn (piano) and Anika Moa (backing vocals) contributed to the album. The first single, "Winning Arrow", was released on the same day. It was her third consecutive studio album to enter the New Zealand charts at number one. Birds was certified triple platinum.

Runga played a 'Vietnamese lounge singer' in the 2005 film Little Fish, and covered Gene Pitney's "Something's Gotten Hold of My Heart" for the soundtrack. In the 2006 New Year Honours, Runga was appointed a Member of the New Zealand Order of Merit, for services to music.

In November 2008, Runga released Try to Remember Everything which is a collection of unreleased, new and rare Bic Runga recordings from 1996 to 2008. The album was certified Gold in New Zealand on 14 December 2008, selling over 7,500 copies.

=== 2011–2015: Belle and Anthology ===
Runga contributed to the score and soundtrack to New Zealand filmmaker Roseanne Liang's debut feature film My Wedding and Other Secrets (2011). In addition to featuring "Say After Me" from Birds, the film also included two tracks ("Hello Hello" and "This Girl's Prepared for War") from her fourth album Belle.

Belle was released in November 2011. Runga completed a 17 date tour across New Zealand and 13 dates across Ireland, United Kingdom and Australia.

A greatest hits album, Anthology, was released on 1 December 2012.

In June 2015, Runga released a new single titled "Dreamed a Dream". This was a collaboration with Hollie Fullbrook of Tiny Ruins, with whom she toured New Zealand in June and July 2015. As well as solo performances by both artists, these shows included covers of songs by Simon & Garfunkel, Yoko Ono, Francoise Hardy, Donovan and Fleetwood Mac.

=== 2016–present: Close Your Eyes and New Zealand Music Hall of Fame ===
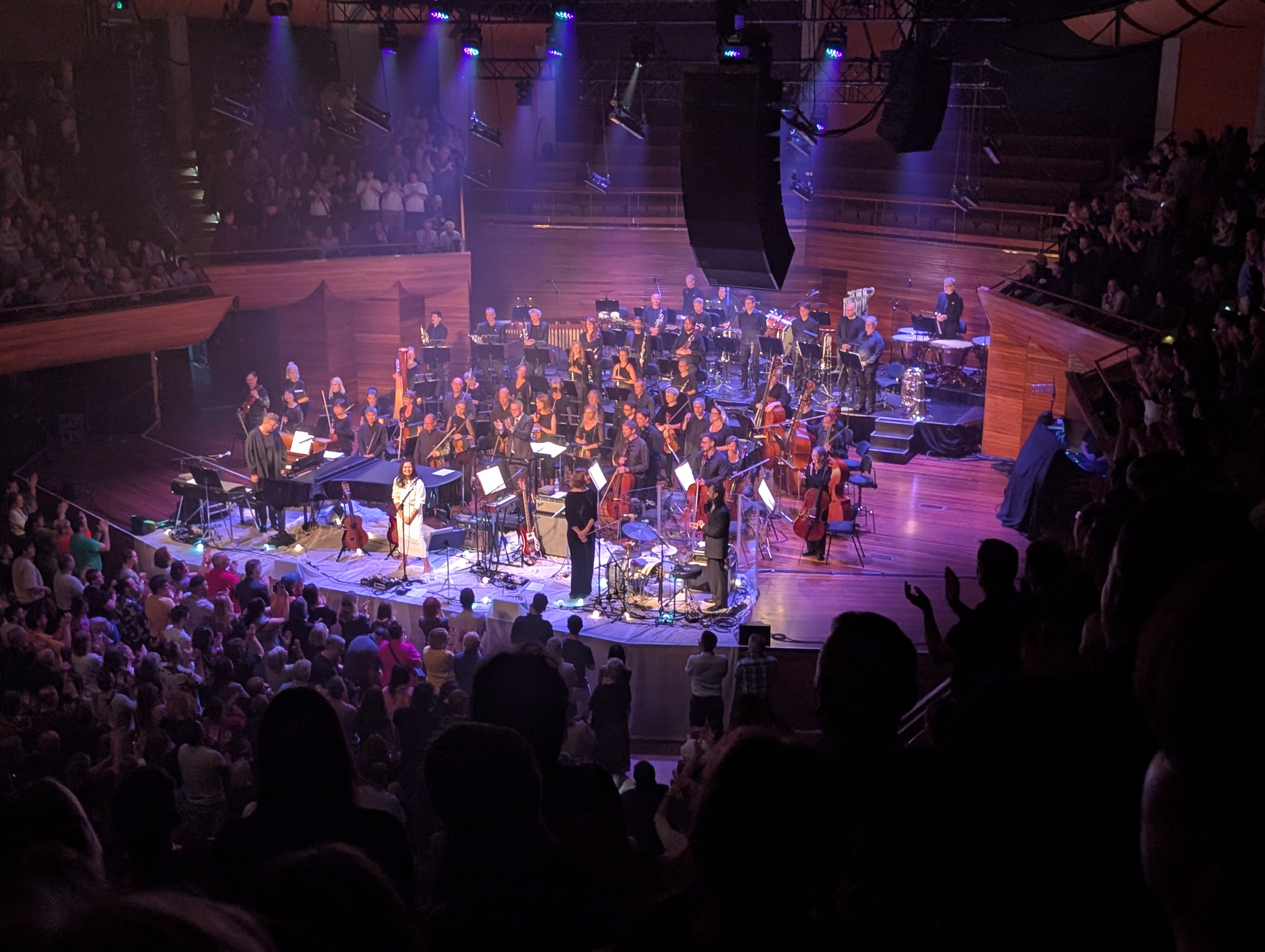
Bic Runga performing with the New Zealand Symphony Orchestra, April 2026

In October 2016, it was announced that Runga would release an album of consisting of ten covers and two original tracks titled Close Your Eyes. "Close Your Eyes" was released on 14 October 2016 as a single.

In November 2016, Runga was inducted into the New Zealand Music Hall of Fame. Recorded Music CEO Damian Vaughan said "Bic is one of our most loved and treasured recording artists, her songs are instantly recognizable and have been part of the fabric of New Zealand for more than 20 years. We're honoured to present Bic with the 2016 Legacy Award and induct her into the NZ Music Hall of Fame".

In September 2025, she announced her upcoming sixth studio album, Red Sunset, which was released in February 2026.

== Personal life ==
Runga's partner is drummer Kody Nielson. She has three children. She has two sisters who are also musicians, Pearl Runga and Boh Runga.

== Discography ==
=== Studio albums ===
- Drive (1997)
- Beautiful Collision (2002)
- Birds (2005)
- Belle (2011)
- Close Your Eyes (2016)
- Red Sunset (2026)

== Awards and nominations ==
=== Honours ===
In the 2006 New Year Honours Runga was appointed a Member of the New Zealand Order of Merit for services to music.

=== APRA Awards (New Zealand) ===
Year	Award	For	Result
1996	APRA Silver Scroll	"Drive"	Won

=== New Zealand Music Awards ===
The New Zealand Music Awards are presented annually by Recorded Music NZ recognising outstanding artistic and technical achievements in the recording field. Winner of the most awards by any individual.

Year	Award	For	Result
1996	Rising Star Award	herself	Nominated
1996	Most Promising Female Vocalist	herself	Won
1997	Single of the Year	"Drive"	Nominated
1997	Best Female Vocalist	herself	Won
1997	Best Songwriter	herself for "Bursting Through"	Nominated
1998	Album of the Year	Drive	Won
1998	Single of the Year	"Sway"	Won
1998	Best Female Vocalist	herself for "Sway"	Won
1998	Best Video	Wayne Conway for Runga's "Suddenly Strange"	Nominated
1998	Best Engineer	Simon Sheridan for Runga's "Sway"	Won
1998	Best Songwriter	Bic Runga's "Sway"	Won
1998	Best Cover	Wayne Conway for Runga's Drive	Won
1999	International Achievement	Bic Runga	Won
2000	International Achievement	Bic Runga	Won
2001	Album of the Year	Tim Finn, Dave Dobbyn & Bic Runga Together in Concert: Live	Nominated
2003	Album of the Year	Beautiful Collision	Nominated
2003	Single of the Year	"Get Some Sleep"	Nominated
2003	Best Female Vocalist	Bic Runga Beautiful Collision	Won
2003	Best Solo Artist	Bic Runga Beautiful Collision	Won
2003	Best Music Video	Chris Graham and Bic Runga for Runga's "Something Good"	Nominated
2003	Highest Selling New Zealand Album	Beautiful Collision	Won
2003	Producer of the Year	Bic Runga Beautiful Collision	Won
2003	Best Female Solo Artist	Live in Concert	Nominated
2003	Highest Selling New Zealand Album	Beautiful Collision	Nominated
2003	International Achievement	Bic Runga	Nominated
2006	Album Of The Year	Birds	Won
2006	Single of the Year	"Winning Arrow"	Nominated
2006	Best Female Solo Artist	Bic Runga Birds	Won
2006	Best Producer	Bic Runga Birds	Won
2006	Peoples Choice Award	herself	Nominated
2006	Best Engineer	Andre Upston for Runga's Birds	Won
2012	Best Pop Album	Belle	Nominated
2012	Best Producer	Kody Nielson for "Belle"	Nominated
2016	New Zealand Music Hall of Fame	herself	Inductee

=== Rolling Stone Aotearoa Awards ===
Year	Award	For	Result
2023	Rolling Stone Icon Award	herself	awarded
