= 1980 in New Zealand =

- Decades: 1960s; 1970s; 1980s; 1990s; 2000s
- See also: History of New Zealand; List of years in New Zealand; Timeline of New Zealand history

The following lists events that happened during 1980 in New Zealand.

== Population ==
- Estimated population as of 31 December: 3,176,400.
- Increase since 31 December 1979: 12,500 (0.40%).
- Males per 100 females: 99.2.

== Incumbents ==
=== Regal and viceregal ===
- Head of State – Elizabeth II
- Governor-General – The Rt Hon Sir Keith Holyoake KG GCMG CH QSO, followed by The Hon Sir David Beattie GCMG GCVO QSO QC.

=== Government ===
The 39th New Zealand Parliament continued. The third National Party government was in power.

- Speaker of the House – Richard Harrison.
- Prime Minister – Robert Muldoon
- Deputy Prime Minister – Brian Talboys.
- Minister of Finance – Robert Muldoon.
- Minister of Foreign Affairs – Brian Talboys.
- Attorney-General – Jim McLay.
- Chief Justice — Sir Ronald Davison

An attempt by high-ranking ministers Derek Quigley, Jim McLay, and Jim Bolger to replace Muldoon as prime minister (known as the "colonels' coup") with the deputy prime minister Talboys collapsed as a result of Talboys' unwillingness to actively campaign against Muldoon.

Three by-elections occurred.

- In East Coast Bays, the sitting National MP Frank Gill resigned to take up the post of New Zealand's ambassador to the United States. The seat was won by Gary Knapp for the Social Credit Party.
- In Northern Maori the MP Matiu Rata, who had left Labour the year before, resigned and recontested the seat for Mana Motuhake. The seat was won by the Labour Party candidate Bruce Gregory.
- In Onehunga a by-election was called after the death of Labour MP Frank Rogers. The seat was won again for the Labour Party by Fred Gerbic.

=== Parliamentary opposition ===
- Leader of the Opposition – Bill Rowling (Labour).
- Social Credit Party – Bruce Beetham

=== Main centre leaders ===
- Mayor of Auckland – Dove-Myer Robinson then Colin Kay
- Mayor of Hamilton – Ross Jansen
- Mayor of Wellington – Michael Fowler
- Mayor of Christchurch – Hamish Hay
- Mayor of Dunedin – Clifford George (Cliff) Skeggs

== Events ==
- 24 March – A Porirua to Wellington commuter train collides with a diesel shunter on the approach to Wellington railway station, killing two and injuring 77.
- A strike at Kinleith Mill lasted for 80 days, and broke the government's wage and price freeze.
- The first Sweetwaters Music Festival was held near Ngāruawāhia.
- The carless days scheme finished.
- Saturday trading allowed (lifting the 1945 restriction), although Sunday trading by most retail outlets apart from dairies and takeaway food outlets remained banned.

== Arts and literature ==
- Philip Temple wins the Robert Burns Fellowship.

See 1980 in art, 1980 in literature, Category:1980 books

=== Music ===
==== New Zealand Music Awards ====
- ALBUM OF THE YEAR Sharon O'Neill – Sharon O'Neill
- SINGLE OF THE YEAR Jon Stevens – Montego Bay
- TOP MALE VOCALIST Jon Stevens
- TOP FEMALE VOCALIST Sharon O'Neill
- TOP GROUP The Crocodiles
- MOST PROMISING MALE VOCALIST Jon Stevens
- MOST PROMISING GROUP Crocodiles
- PRODUCER OF THE YEAR Dave MaCrae & Kevin Oliff – Pacific Eardrum (Pacific Eardrum)
- ENGINEER OF THE YEAR Tony Burns – Pacific Eardrum (Pacific Eardrum)
- BEST COVER Peter Burt – Pacific Eardrum (Pacific Eardrum)
- OUTSTANDING CONTRIBUTION Terence O’Neill-Joyce

See: 1980 in music

=== Performing arts ===
- Benny Award presented by the Variety Artists Club of New Zealand to Peter Evans.

=== Radio and television ===
- Television One and South Pacific Television are merged into Television New Zealand.
- The national newsroom is moved from Avalon in Lower Hutt to Auckland.
- Feltex Television Awards:
  - Best Information: Country Calendar
  - Best Documentary: From the Ocean to the Sky
  - Best Drama: Children of Fire Mountain
  - Best Speciality: 1979 SPT International Track Series
  - Best Children's: Spot On
  - Best Script: Episode five of Children of Fire Mountain
  - Best Actor: Terence Cooper in Children of Fire Mountain
  - Best Actress: Ginette McDonald as Sandra Allenby in It's Your Child, Norman Allenby
  - Best Television Entertainer: David McPhail

See: 1980 in New Zealand television, 1980 in television, List of TVNZ television programming, Category:Television in New Zealand, Category:New Zealand television shows, Public broadcasting in New Zealand

=== Film ===
- Beyond Reasonable Doubt
- Goodbye Pork Pie
- Lincoln County Incident
- Squeeze

See: Category:1980 film awards, 1980 in film, List of New Zealand feature films, Cinema of New Zealand, Category:1980 films

== Sport ==
=== Athletics ===
- Don Greig wins his first national title in the men's marathon, clocking 2:17:08 on 15 March in Christchurch, while the first women's championship is won by Beverley Shingles in 2:44:48.

=== Chess ===
- The 87th New Zealand Chess Championship is held in Upper Hutt. There is a three-way tie between Ewen McGowen Green, Ortvin Sarapu, and Vernon A. Small.

=== Horse racing ===
==== Harness racing ====
- New Zealand Trotting Cup: Hands Down
- Auckland Trotting Cup: Delightful Lady

=== Olympic Games ===
==== Summer Olympics ====
- Only four of the 98 New Zealand competitors originally selected go to the Summer Olympics because of the Western boycott.

Gold	Silver	Bronze	Total
0	0	0	0

==== Winter Olympics ====
- New Zealand sends a team of five alpine skiers.

Gold	Silver	Bronze	Total
0	0	0	0

=== Paralympic Games ===
==== Summer Paralympics ====
Gold	Silver	Bronze	Total
7	6	7	20

==== Winter Paralympics ====
- New Zealand sends its first team to a Winter Paralympics, consisting of three competitors in one sport.

Gold	Silver	Bronze	Total
0	0	0	0

=== Rugby union ===
- In the 1980 New Zealand rugby union tour of Australia in June / July Australia won two of the three tests, retaining the Bledisloe Cup
- 23 July: The All Blacks beat Fiji 30–6 at ANZ National Stadium
- 13 September: The All Blacks beat Fiji 33–0 at Eden Park
- 8 October—1 November: All Blacks tour of North America and Wales
- Auckland defend the Ranfurly Shield against five challengers (Horowhenua 37–3, King Country 29–3, Poverty Bay 19–12, Southland 25–3, and Otago 43—13) before losing to Waikato 3–7. Waikato then beat Thames Valley 16—7 and Taranaki 15—0 to retain the shield at the end of the season.
- National Provincial Championship winners:
  - Division 1: Manawatu.
  - Division 2 North: Waikato
  - Division 2 South: Mid Canterbury
- The North vs South match is played in Palmerston North and is won 13–9 by North.

=== Soccer ===
- New Zealand National Soccer League won by Mount Wellington
- The Chatham Cup is won by Mount Wellington who beat Dunedin City 2–0 in the final.
- New Zealand was unplaced in the Oceania Cup tournament held in New Caledonia

== Births ==
- 7 January: Campbell Johnstone, rugby player
- 10 January: Tasesa Lavea, rugby union and rugby league player.
- 15 January: Jason Cayless, rugby league player.
- 30 January: Sam Harris, rugby league and rugby union player.
- 5 February: Kyle Pontifex, hockey player.
- 10 February: Riki Flutey, rugby union player.
- 11 February: Nikki Kaye, politician.
- 29 February: Clinton Toopi, rugby league player.
- 4 March: Scott Hamilton, rugby union player.
- 6 March: Gareth Fleming, musician.
- 9 March: Trent Croad, Australian rules footballer.
- 14 April: Jeremy Smith, rugby league player.
- 15 April: Willie Mason, rugby league player.
- 16 April: David Hall, rugby union player.
- 22 April: Clarke Dermody, rugby union player.
- 25 April: Phil Burrows, hockey player.
- 25 April: Bruce Martin, cricketer.
- 7 May: Jeetan Patel, cricketer.
- 8 May: Steven Ferguson, canoer and swimmer.
- 10 May: Brad Carter, musician.
- 13 May: Ken Uprichard, archer.
- 21 May: Anika Moa, singer/songwriter.
- 24 May: William Trubridge, free-diver.
- 30 May: Henry Fa'afili, rugby league player.
- 16 June: Henry Perenara, rugby league player.
- 7 July: Benjamin Mitchell, actor.
- 22 July: Scott Dixon, racing car driver.
- 26 July: Jacinda Ardern, 40th Prime Minister of New Zealand
- 31 July (in Samoa): Mils Muliaina, rugby union player.
- 10 August: Pua Magasiva, actor. (d. 2019)
- 12 August: Blair Hopping, hockey player.
- 14 August: Nick Evans, rugby union player.
- 31 August: Hayden Shaw, hockey player.
- 1 September: Ryan Archibald, hockey player.
- 4 September: Lucie Silvas, singer/songwriter.
- 9 September: David Fa'alogo, rugby player.
- 12 September: Clifford Manua, rugby player.
- 23 September: Shannon Paku, rugby player.
- 25 September: Luc Mullinder, Canadian Football player.
- 29 October: Kaine Robertson, rugby player.
- 4 November: Jerry Collins, rugby player. (d. 2015)
- 7 November: James Franklin, cricketer.
- 8 November: Brent Webb, rugby player.
- 23 November: Kirk Penney, basketball player.
- 25 November: Michael Wilson, soccer player.
- 29 November: Aaron Mauger, rugby player.
- 5 December: Heath Blackgrove, cyclist.
- 17 December: Tim Youngson, musician.
- 24 December: Andrew Barron, football (soccer) player.
- 31 December: Richie McCaw, rugby player.
- Ben Goodger, lead developer of the Firefox web browser.

== Deaths ==
- 8 January: Logan Sloane, politician.
- 29 March: Harold David London, public servant, philatelist, cycling administrator, editor and local historian
- 12 April: Clark McConachy, snooker and billiards player.
- 15 May: Len Lye, sculptor, artist, writer and film-maker.
- 14 July:Norman Shelton, politician.
- 26 July: Bertie Victor Cooksley, politician.
- 2 August: Verdun Scott, cricketer.
- 5 August: William Perrett Mead, engineer, skier, tramper, ranger and writer.
- 9 August: Denis Glover, poet and publisher.
- 28 November: Air Commodore Keith Caldwell MC DFC, WWI flying ace.
- 28 November: Bernard Fergusson, Baron Ballantrae, Governor-General.
- 5 December: Don Taylor, cricketer.

== See also ==
- List of years in New Zealand
- Timeline of New Zealand history
- History of New Zealand
- Military history of New Zealand
- Timeline of the New Zealand environment
- Timeline of New Zealand's links with Antarctica
