= 1982 in New Zealand =

- Decades: 1960s; 1970s; 1980s; 1990s; 2000s
- See also: History of New Zealand; List of years in New Zealand; Timeline of New Zealand history

The following lists events that happened during 1982 in New Zealand.

== Population ==
- Estimated population as of 31 December: 3,226,800.
- Increase since 31 December 1981: 32,300 (1.01%).
- Males per 100 females: 98.6.

=== Regal and viceregal ===
- Head of State – Elizabeth II
- Governor-General – The Hon Sir David Beattie GCMG GCVO QSO QC.

=== Government ===
The 40th New Zealand Parliament continued. The third National Party government was in power.

- Speaker of the House – Richard Harrison
- Prime Minister – Robert Muldoon
- Deputy Prime Minister – Duncan MacIntyre
- Minister of Finance – Robert Muldoon
- Minister of Foreign Affairs – Warren Cooper
- Chief Justice — Sir Ronald Davison

=== Parliamentary opposition ===
- Leader of the Opposition – Bill Rowling (Labour) until 3 February, then David Lange.
- Social Credit Party – Bruce Beetham

=== Main centre leaders ===
- Mayor of Auckland – Colin Kay
- Mayor of Hamilton – Ross Jansen
- Mayor of Wellington – Michael Fowler
- Mayor of Christchurch – Hamish Hay
- Mayor of Dunedin – Cliff Skeggs

== Events ==
- The first Kohanga reo kindergarten, Pukeatua, opens at Wainuiomata. Within 12 years there were more than 800 nationwide.
- Social Credit forms an agreement with National to back the Clyde Dam (a Think Big project) in exchange for policy concessions.
- The Clutha Development (Clyde Dam) Empowerment Act was passed, overriding the High Court and Planning Tribunal.
- The proposed aluminium smelter at Aramoana was cancelled.
- The Social Credit Political League changes its name to the Social Credit Party.
- New Zealand provided assistance to the British during the Falklands War, primarily by taking over routine patrol duties elsewhere to free up British military resources.
- The Warehouse opens its first store, in Takapuna.
- January: The third Sweetwaters Music Festival is held near Pukekawa.
- 3 February: David Lange succeeds Bill Rowling as Leader of the Opposition.
- 4 April: New Zealand breaks diplomatic relations with Argentina over the Falklands Crisis.
- 22 June: Robert Muldoon announces a 12-month wage and price freeze. The freeze actually lasts almost two years.
- 14 September: Samoans who take up permanent residence in New Zealand are entitled to New Zealand citizenship from this date. This follows a case referred to the Privy Council which decided in July 1982 to allow all Samoans born under New Zealand administration (i.e. prior to 1962) to claim New Zealand citizenship.
- November: Mark Inglis and Philip Doole are stuck in an ice cave on Aoraki / Mount Cook for 14 days.
- 18 November: a suicide bomb attack was made against a facility housing the main computer database of the New Zealand Police in Wanganui by a "punk rock" anarchist named Neil Roberts. He was the only person killed, and the computer system was undamaged, see Terrorism in New Zealand.
- 14 December: Robert Muldoon signs a "Heads of Agreement" with Australia to allow the Closer Economic Relations agreement to come into force at the beginning of 1983.

== Arts and literature ==
- William Sewell wins the Robert Burns Fellowship

See 1982 in art, 1982 in literature, Category:1982 books

=== Music ===
- DD Smash produce their debut album, Cool Bananas.

==== New Zealand Music Awards ====
Winners are shown first and in boldface with nominees underneath.

- Album of the year: **DD Smash – Cool Bananas**
- Single of the year: **Prince Tui Teka – E Ipo**
- Top male vocalist: **Dave Dobbyn (DD Smash)**
  - Malcolm McNeill
  - Monte Video
- Top female vocalist: **Patsy Riggir**
  - Suzanne Prentice
  - Trudi Green (The Neighbours)
- Top group of the year: **DD Smash**
  - Herbs
  - The Narcs
- Most promising male vocalist: **Dave Dobbyn (DD Smash)**
- Most promising female vocalist: **Jodi Vaughan**
- Most promising group: **Dance Exponents**
- Polynesian record of the year: **Prince Tui Teka – E Ipo**
- Producer of the year: **Ian Morris – Cool Bananas (DD Smash)**
- Engineer of the year: **Paul Streekstra & Doug Rogers – Cool Bananas (DD Smash)**
- Sleeve design of the year: **Wayne Robinson –Cool Bananas (DD Smash)**
- Outstanding contribution to music: **Simon Grigg**

See: 1982 in music

=== Performing arts ===
- Benny Award presented by the Variety Artists Club of New Zealand to Don Linden.

=== Radio and television ===
- FM Stereo transmissions were being tested. Radio Bay of Plenty Limited, operating 1XX (previously 1240 am then 1242 am in 1978) also in Whakatane, ran the first of many short-term summer stations.
- 1XX – FM 90.7 This station was the first licensed FM Stereo Radio station in New Zealand. The station went to air at 4 pm on 5 January 1982 and went through to 31 January 1982 with the station on-air each day in two shifts: 4 pm – 8 pm & 8 pm – 12 am Midnight. Announcers: Chris Clarke,
- Te Karere, a Māori language news program, is trialled.
- Northern Television begins broadcasting morning television programs.
- Feltex Television Awards:
  - Best Information: Country Calendar
  - Best Documentary: Landmarks
  - Best News and Current Affairs: Close Up
  - Best Entertainment: Gliding On
  - Best Drama: Under the Mountain
  - Best Speciality: Kaleidoscope
  - Best Children's: Wild Track
  - Best New Talent: Olly Ohlson in After School
  - Best Actress: Susan Wilson in Mortimer's Patch and Gliding On
  - Best Actor: Bruce Allpress in Jocko
  - Steve Hosgood Award for Allied Craft: Robert Brown, cameraman
  - Best Television Entertainer: David McPhail and Jon Gadsby
  - Special Award: Ian Watkin for Service to the Industry
  - Best Script: Cry Wolf from Open File

See: 1982 in New Zealand television, 1982 in television, List of TVNZ television programming, Category:Television in New Zealand, Category:New Zealand television shows, Public broadcasting in New Zealand

=== Film ===
- Carry Me Back
- Battletruck
- The Scarecrow
- Hang On a Minute Mate

See: Category:1982 film awards, 1982 in film, List of New Zealand feature films, Cinema of New Zealand, Category:1982 films

== Sport ==
=== Athletics ===
- Trevor Wright wins his first national title in the men's marathon, clocking 2:19:34 on 3 April in Whangārei.

=== Basketball ===
- Inaugural season of the NZ National Basketball League, won by Auckland.

=== Commonwealth Games ===
Gold	Silver	Bronze	Total
5	8	13	26

=== Horse racing ===
==== Harness racing ====
- New Zealand Trotting Cup: Bonnie's Chance
- Auckland Trotting Cup (2700m): Gammalite

ROWING

New Zealand men's rowing 8 win gold medal at the world rowing championships in Lucerne, Switzerland.

Stephanie Foster wins the first ever NZ women's medal at a world championships with a bronze medal in the single sculls event.

=== Rugby union ===
- Australia tours and play 3 tests. These are won 2–1 by New Zealand, who win back the Bledisloe Cup
- Lion National Provincial Championship:
  - Division 1: Auckland
  - Division 2 (North): Taranaki
  - Division 2 (south): Southland
- The North vs South match is played in Wanganui and is won 22-12 by South.

=== Shooting ===
- Ballinger Belt – John Hastie (Okawa)

=== Soccer ===
- The All Whites reach the Football World Cup Finals in Barcelona, but lose all three games.
- New Zealand National Soccer League won by Mount Wellington
- The Chatham Cup is won by Mount Wellington who beat Miramar Rangers 1—0 after extra time in the final.

== Births ==
=== January to June ===
- 6 January – Roy Asotasi, rugby league player.
- 12 January – Tony Lochhead, football (soccer) player.
- 17 January – Tim Weston, cricketer.
- 30 January – Shontayne Hape, rugby league player.
- 1 February – Sam Tuitupou, rugby union player.
- 5 March – Dan Carter, rugby union player.
- 6 March – Jimmy Cowan, rugby union player.
- 20 March – Rory Fallon, football (soccer) player.
- 22 March – Chris Smylie, rugby player.
- 24 March – James Napier, actor.
- 4 April – Andrea Hewitt, athlete.
- 19 April – Sitiveni Sivivatu, rugby union and sevens player.
- 3 May – Casey Laulala, rugby union player.
- 6 May – Eric Murray, rower, Olympic gold medallist (2012 London)
- 9 May – Kody Nielson, musician and vocalist of The Mint Chicks
- 13 May – Mika Vukona, basketball player.
- 16 May – Jonathan Duncan, swimmer.
- 21 May – Ma'a Nonu, rugby union player.
- 22 June – Stu Mills, cricketer.

=== July to December ===
- 1 July – James Pritchett, football (soccer) player.
- 4 July – Jeff Lima, rugby league player.
- 6 July – Jeremy Yates, cyclist.
- 15 July – Neemia Tialata, rugby union player.
- 17 July – Eve van Grafhorst.
- 24 July – Anna Paquin, actress.
- 4 August – Juliette Haigh, rower, Olympic bronze medallist (2012 London)
- 15 August – Jason Eaton, rugby union player.
- 30 August – Russell Ward, skeleton racer.
- 7 September – Krystal Forgesson, field hockey player.
- 16 September – Lizzy Igasan, field hockey defender.
- 29 September – Joline Henry, netball player.
- 11 October – Cameron Knowles, football (soccer) player.
- 14 November – Sailosi Tagicakibau, Samoan rugby player
- 17 November – Hollie Smith, singer-songwriter.

Category:1982 births

== Deaths ==
- 3 January 1982: Bernard O'Brien, philosopher and theologian.
- 18 February: Dame Ngaio Marsh writer and director.
- 1 March: Frank Gill, Air Commodore, politician.
- 1 March: Frank Sargeson, writer.
- 24 May: William Sheat, politician.
- 4 March (in London): Dorothy Eden, novelist.
- 29 April: Ray Boord, politician.
- 9 June (in Canada): Richard St. Barbe Baker, silviculturist and conservationist.
- 11 June: Sir Valdemar Skellerup, industrialist.
- 13 June: John A. Lee politician and writer.
- 15 July: Don Beard, cricketer.
- 2 September: Clive Hulme, Victoria Cross winner.
- 19 September: Ted Badcock, cricketer.
- 8 October: Cora Wilding, physiotherapist and artist.
- 14 October: Andrew Davidson, educationalist
- 1 November (in Canada): Eric Arthur, architect.
- 22 November (in Majorca, Spain): Jean Batten aviator.
- 2 December: Sir Robert Macfarlane, politician.
- 18 December: Ray Emery, cricketer.

== See also ==
- List of years in New Zealand
- Timeline of New Zealand history
- History of New Zealand
- Military history of New Zealand
- Timeline of the New Zealand environment
- Timeline of New Zealand's links with Antarctica
