= 1981 in New Zealand =

- Decades: 1960s; 1970s; 1980s; 1990s; 2000s
- See also: History of New Zealand; List of years in New Zealand; Timeline of New Zealand history

The following lists events that happened during 1981 in New Zealand.

== Population ==
- Estimated population as of 31 December: 3,194,500.
- Increase since 31 December 1980: 18,100 (0.57%).
- Males per 100 females: 98.7.

== Incumbents ==
=== Regal and viceregal ===
- Head of State – Elizabeth II
- Governor-General – The Hon Sir David Beattie GCMG GCVO QSO QC.

=== Government ===
The 39th New Zealand Parliament, led by the National Party, concluded, and in the general election the party was re-elected in the 40th New Zealand Parliament. Support for the government decreased, however, with the Labour Party receiving the largest portion of the popular vote.

- Speaker of the House – Richard Harrison.
- Prime Minister – Robert Muldoon
- Deputy Prime Minister – Brian Talboys then Duncan MacIntyre.
- Minister of Finance – Robert Muldoon.
- Minister of Foreign Affairs – Brian Talboys then Warren Cooper.
- Attorney-General – Jim McLay.
- Chief Justice — Sir Ronald Davison

=== Parliamentary opposition ===
- Leader of the Opposition – Bill Rowling (Labour).
- Social Credit Party – Bruce Beetham

=== Main centre leaders ===
- Mayor of Auckland – Colin Kay
- Mayor of Hamilton – Ross Jansen
- Mayor of Wellington – Michael Fowler
- Mayor of Christchurch – Hamish Hay
- Mayor of Dunedin – Clifford George (Cliff) Skeggs

== Events ==
- January – Nambassa five-day celebration of music, crafts and alternative lifestyles culture on 250-acre (100 ha) farm at Waitawheta Valley between Waihi and Waikino. Attendance 20,000.
- January – The second Sweetwaters Music Festival is held near Ngāruawāhia.
- 31 March – 12 April: Charles, Prince of Wales visits New Zealand, opening the Royal New Zealand Police College and receiving an honorary degree from the University of Otago.
- 11–16 April – Flooding in the Waikato causes over 2,250 people to evacuate their homes.
- 27 April – The Mahon Report into the crash of Air New Zealand Flight 901 is released, in which Justice Peter Mahon famously accuses Air New Zealand of telling "an orchestrated litany of lies".
- May – The first ATM in New Zealand was introduced in Wellington by the Northern Building Society.
- July – Passports reintroduced for New Zealanders travelling to Australia. The Australian Royal Commission of Inquiry into Drugs says the exemption was exploited; travel had not required passports following the 1972 Trans-Tasman Travel Agreement.
- 13 July – The South African rugby union team ("Springboks") arrives in New Zealand to begin the 1981 Springbok Tour
- 25 July – 1981 Springbok Tour: The match between South Africa and Waikato at Rugby Park, Hamilton, is cancelled after 350 anti-apartheid protesters invade the pitch.
- 18 August – Four people are killed after a Silver Fern railcar derails near Waiouru.
- 13 September – The Springbok rugby team leave New Zealand.
- 12–20 October – The Queen and the Duke of Edinburgh visit New Zealand, following a Commonwealth Heads of Government meeting in Melbourne.
- 14 October – Christopher John Lewis attempts to assassinate Elizabeth II while she is visiting Dunedin.
- The Kohanga reo scheme is established by the Department of Māori Affairs.
- The Food Act 1981 is passed into law.
- The Poor Knights Islands Marine Reserve is established

== Arts and literature ==
- William Sewell wins the Robert Burns Fellowship

See 1981 in art, 1981 in literature, Category:1981 books

=== Music ===
==== New Zealand Music Awards ====
Winners are shown first and in boldface with nominees underneath.

- ALBUM OF THE YEAR: **Dave McArtney & The Pink Flamingos – Dave McArtney & The Pink Flamingos**
  - Dennis O'Brien – Still in the same Dream
  - Hammond Gamble – Hammond Gamble Band
- SINGLE OF THE YEAR: **Coup D'État – Doctor, I Like Your Medicine**
  - Blam Blam Blam – No Depression in New Zealand
  - Screaming Meemees – See Me Go
- TOP MALE VOCALIST: **Dave McArtney (Dave McArtney & The Pink Flamingos)**
  - Deane Waretinei
  - Hammond Gamble
- TOP FEMALE VOCALIST: **Suzanne Prentice**
  - Jenny Morris
  - Tina Cross
- TOP GROUP: **Dave McArtney & The Pink Flamingos – Dave McArtney & The Pink Flamingos**
  - Newmatics
  - Coup DE'tat
- MOST PROMISING MALE VOCALIST: **Dave McArtney**
  - Paul Schreider
  - David Hollis
  - Richard Eriwata
- MOST PROMISING FEMALE VOCALIST: **Anne Dumont**
  - Celine Toner
  - Jenny Morris
- MOST PROMISING GROUP: **The Screaming Meemees**
  - Blam Blam Blam
  - Pop Mechanix
- ENGINEER OF THE YEAR: **Dave Hurley & Graham Myhre – Dave McArtney & the Pink Flamingos**
  - Graham Myhre – Remember the Alamo
  - Gerry Smith – Still in the Same Dream
- PRODUCER OF THE YEAR: **Bruce Lynch – Dave McArtney and the Pink Flamingos**
  - James Hall – Breaking in Another Day
  - James Hall – Still in the Same Dream
- BEST COVER DESIGN: **David Hollis – Caught Alive**
  - Mark Clare – Broadcast O.R
  - Hal Chapman – Dave McArtney and the Pink Flamingos
- SPECIAL AWARD: **Fred Smith – Services to the Recording Industry (particularly with regard to Copyright)**

See: 1981 in music

=== Performing arts ===
- Benny Award presented by the Variety Artists Club of New Zealand to Marcus Craig.

=== Radio and television ===
- 11 May – TV One airs the Dallas episode "A House Divided", in which character J.R. Ewing is shot.
- Feltex Television Awards:
  - Best Drama: Mortimer's Patch
  - Best Speciality: Sport on One – Sunday
  - Best Entertainment: Radio Times
  - Best Documentary: Moriori
  - Best Children's: Video Dispatch
  - Best Information: Country Calendar
  - Best Current Affairs: Close Up
  - Best Actor: Terence Cooper
  - Best Actress: Glynis McNicoll
  - Best Script: Little Big Man Takes a Shot at the Moon
  - Best Television Entertainer: Hudson and Halls
  - Stan Hosgood Award for Allied Craft: Logan Brewer, Set designer for Hunter's Gold, Gather Your Dreams, Children of Fire Mountain, I Pagliacci

See: 1981 in New Zealand television, 1981 in television, List of TVNZ television programming, Category:Television in New Zealand, Category:New Zealand television shows, Public broadcasting in New Zealand

=== Film ===
- Pictures
- Race for the Yankee Zephyr
- Smash Palace
- Wildcat
- Dead Kids/Strange Behavior

See: Category:1981 film awards, 1981 in film, List of New Zealand feature films, Cinema of New Zealand, Category:1981 films

== Sport ==
=== Athletics ===
- Paul Ballinger wins his second national title in the men's marathon, clocking 2:17:28 on 2 May in Rotorua, while Christine Munro claims her first title in the women's championship (2:56:04).

=== Chess ===
- The 88th New Zealand Chess Championship is held in Christchurch. There is a three-way tie between Ewen McGowen Green, Ortvin Sarapu, and Vernon A. Small .

=== Cricket ===
- 1 February: Australian Trevor Chappell bowled an underarm delivery to batsman Brian McKechnie in a One-day International cricket match, the third of five matches in the final of the Benson & Hedges World Series Cup.

=== Horse racing ===
==== Harness racing ====
- New Zealand Trotting Cup: Armalight
- Auckland Trotting Cup: Delightful Lady – 2nd win

=== Rugby union ===
- 13 June: The All Blacks beat Scotland 11–4 at Carisbrook
- 20 June: The All Blacks beat Scotland 40–15 at Eden Park
- 15 August: The All Blacks beat South Africa 14–9 at Lancaster Park as part of the 1981 Springbok Tour
- 29 August: The All Blacks lost 12–24 to South Africa at Athletic Park as part of the 1981 Springbok Tour
- 12 September: The All Blacks beat South Africa 25–22 at Eden Park as part of the 1981 Springbok Tour
- 24 October: The All Blacks beat Romania 14–6 in Bucharest
- 14 November: The All Blacks beat France 13–9 in Toulouse
- 21 November: The All Blacks beat France 18–6 in Paris
- The North vs South match is played in Dunedin and won by North, 10-4

=== Shooting ===
- Ballinger Belt – Diane Blaymires (Te Puke)

=== Soccer ===
- The All Whites qualify for the 1982 Football World Cup
- New Zealand National Soccer League won by, Wellington Diamond United
- The Chatham Cup is won by Dunedin City who beat Mount Wellington 3–1 in the final.

== Births ==
- 5 January: Corey Flynn, rugby player.
- 10 January: Hayden Roulston, professional cyclist.
- 21 January: Jason Williams, rugby player.
- 27 January: Tony Woodcock, rugby player.
- 29 January: Jake Adams, musician.
- 12 February: Daniel Braid, rugby player.
- 21 February: Tainui Tukiwaho, Actor.
- 6 March: Tim Brown, soccer player.
- 20 March: Jamaal Lolesi, rugby league player.
- 25 March: Mose Tuiali'i, rugby player.
- 27 March: Sione Faumuina, rugby league player.
- 30 April: Ali Williams, rugby player.
- 4 May: Kate Elliott, actor.
- 6 May: Jodi Te Huna, netball player.
- 10 May: Lloyd Stephenson, field hockey player.
- 19 May: Jamie How, cricketer.
- 25 May: Shelley Paikea, singer.
- 25 May: Matt Utai, rugby league player.
- 25 May: Motu Tony, rugby league player.
- 2 June: Brad Mika, rugby player.
- 9 June: Dean Couzins, field hockey player.
- 19 June: Moss Burmester, swimmer.
- 28 June: Demetrius "Savage" Savelio, rapper.
- 3 July: Tevita Latu, rugby league player.
- 31 July: Paul Whatuira, rugby league player.
- 31 July: Scott Talbot, swimmer and swimming coach.
- 3 August: Daniel Koprivcic, soccer player.
- 6 September: Te Atirau Paki, television presenter.
- 22 September: James Stosic, rugby player.
- 24 September: Michael Davidson, cricketer.
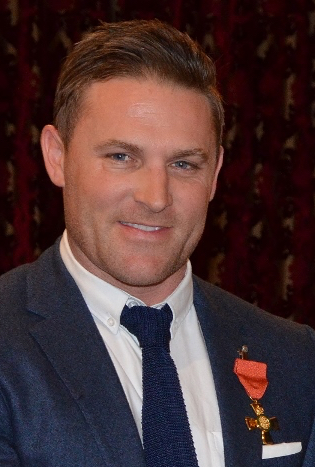
- Brendon McCullum
  27 September: Brendon McCullum, cricketer.
- 29 September (in Germany): Shane Smeltz, soccer player.
- 29 October: Dwayne Cameron, actor
- 29 October (in Sydney): Jamie Waugh, writer.
- 24 November: Ian Butler, cricketer.
- 10 December: Caleb Ross, actor.
- 10 December: Conrad Smith, rugby player.
- 20 December: Leo Bertos, soccer player.

Category:1981 births

== Deaths ==
- 29 January: J. A. W. Bennett, literary scholar.
- 23 March: Beatrice Tinsley, astronomer.
- 21 December: Iriaka Rātana, politician.
- Keith Murray, architect and ceramic designer.

== See also ==
- List of years in New Zealand
- Timeline of New Zealand history
- History of New Zealand
- Military history of New Zealand
- Timeline of the New Zealand environment
- Timeline of New Zealand's links with Antarctica
