= 1985 in New Zealand =

- Decades: 1960s; 1970s; 1980s; 1990s; 2000s
- See also: History of New Zealand; List of years in New Zealand; Timeline of New Zealand history

The following lists events that happened during 1985 in New Zealand.

== Population ==
- Estimated population as of 31 December: 3,303,100.
- Increase since 31 December 1984: 10,100 (0.31%).
- Males per 100 Females: 98.2.

== Incumbents ==
=== Regal and viceregal ===
- Head of State – Elizabeth II
- Governor-General – The Hon Sir David Beattie GCMG GCVO QSO QC followed by The Rt Revd. Sir Paul Reeves GCMG GCVO QSO

=== Government ===
The 41st New Zealand Parliament continued. The fourth Labour Party government was in power.

- Speaker of the House – Basil Arthur then Gerard Wall
- Prime Minister – David Lange
- Deputy Prime Minister – Geoffrey Palmer
- Minister of Finance – Roger Douglas
- Minister of Foreign Affairs – David Lange
- Chief Justice — Sir Ronald Davison

=== Parliamentary opposition ===
- Leader of the Opposition – Jim McLay (National).

=== Main centre leaders ===
- Mayor of Auckland – Catherine Tizard
- Mayor of Hamilton – Ross Jansen
- Mayor of Wellington – Ian Lawrence
- Mayor of Christchurch – Hamish Hay
- Mayor of Dunedin – Cliff Skeggs

== Events ==
- 4 February – Anti-nuclear policy leads to refusal of a visit by the American warship, the USS "Buchanan". Within days the United States cut military and intelligence ties with New Zealand and downgraded diplomatic relationships.
- First case of locally contracted AIDS is reported.
- Waitangi Tribunal given power to hear grievances arising since 1840.
- 4 March – New Zealand dollar floated.
- 15 June – A by-election in Timaru after the death of Labour MP Basil Arthur is won by Maurice McTigue for National.
- 12 June – The first Pak'nSave opens in Kaitaia.
- 21 June – Al Noor Mosque in Christchurch opens.
- 10 July – two French secret agents blew up the Greenpeace flagship Rainbow Warrior in Auckland, killing crewmember Fernando Pereira. The Rainbow Warrior had been preparing to sail to Moruroa Atoll in the SE Pacific, to protest French nuclear weapons testing there.
- 20 November – Archbishop Paul Reeves appointed Governor General.

== Arts and literature ==
- Keri Hulme wins Booker Prize for "The Bone People".
- Cilla McQueen wins the Robert Burns Fellowship.

See 1985 in art, 1985 in literature, Category:1985 books

=== Music ===
==== New Zealand Music Awards ====
Winners are shown first with nominees underneath.

- ALBUM OF THE YEAR Netherworld Dancing Toys – Painted Years
  - Shona Laing – Genre
  - Herbs – Long Ago
- SINGLE OF THE YEAR Netherworld Dancing Toys – For Today
  - The Mockers – Forever Tuesday Morning
  - Peking Man – Lift Your Head Up High
- BEST MALE VOCALIST Andrew Fagan (The Mockers)
  - Malcolm Black (Netherworld Dancing Toys)
  - Pat Urlich (Peking Man)
- BEST FEMALE VOCALIST Margaret Urlich
  - Patsy Riggir
  - Jacqui Fitzgerald
- BEST GROUP Netherworld Dancing Toys
  - The Mockers
  - Peking Man
- MOST PROMISING MALE VOCALIST Mark Loveys (Satellite Spies)
  - Paul Eversden (Katango)
  - James Gaylyn (Rise)
- MOST PROMISING FEMALE VOCALIST Debbie Harwood
  - Dianne Swann (Everything That Flies)
  - Betty Monga (IQU)
- MOST PROMISING GROUP Satellite Spies – Destiny in Motion
  - Everything That Flies – Bleeding Hearts
  - Katango – Dial L for Love
- INTERNATIONAL ACHIEVEMENT Dame Kiri Te Kanawa
  - DD Smash
  - Dalvanius Prime & The Patea Maori Club
- BEST VIDEO Fane Flaws – Diamonds on China (The Narcs)
  - Debra Bustin – Krazy Legs (The Pelicans)
  - Roger Guise – I Like To Drive (Scotty & Co)
- BEST FILM SOUNDTRACK Hammond Gamble / Beaver – Should I be good Should I Be Evil
  - Stephen McCurdy – Out in the Cold (Came A Hot Friday)
- BEST PRODUCER Nigel Stone – For Today
  - Glyn Tucker Jnr- Forever Tuesday Morning (The Mockers)
  - Graeme Myhre – Lift Your Head Up High (Peking Man)
- BEST ENGINEER Graeme Myhre – Lift Your Head Up High
  - Nigel Stone – For Today (Netherworld Dancing Toys)
  - Nigel Stone – Painted Years (Netherworld Dancing Toys)
- BEST JAZZ ALBUM Jacqui Fitzgerald – The Masquerade Is Over
  - Martin Winch – Sahara
  - Alan Broadbent Trio – Song of Home
- BEST CLASSICAL ALBUM Tamas Vasmas – Brahms
  - Dolce Consort – Recorder Music
  - National Youth Choir – Peter Godfrey Conducts the National Youth Choir of NZ
- BEST COUNTRY ALBUM Patsy Riggir – You Remind Me of a Love Song
  - Suzanne Prentice – I Wish I Was Waltzing With You
  - Richie Pickett & The Inlaws – Gone For Water
- BEST FOLK ALBUM Alan Young – That's No Way To Get Along
  - Martha Louise – The Sailor / Mixed Feelings
  - Mike Harding – Time on the Road
- BEST GOSPEL ALBUM Jules Riding – On This Night
  - Gray Bartlett – Two Shades of Gray
  - Wellington Salvation Army – Where Glory Dwelleth
- POLYNESIAN ALBUM OF THE YEAR Herbs – Long Ago
  - Aotearoa – Maranga Ake Ai
  - Howard Morrison – Songs of New Zealand
- BEST COVER Debra Bustin – Krazy Legs (The Pelicans)
  - Norman Te Whata & Emily Karaka – Long Ago (Herbs)
  - Paula Reid – State House Kid (Last Man Down)

See: 1985 in music

=== Performing arts ===
- Benny Award presented by the Variety Artists Club of New Zealand to Toni Savage BEM QSM.

=== Radio and television ===
See: 1985 in New Zealand television, 1985 in television, List of TVNZ television programming, Category:Television in New Zealand, TV3 (New Zealand), Category:New Zealand television shows, Public broadcasting in New Zealand

- 29 March: Applications close for warrants to operate a third television channel.
- Julian Mounter is appointed the TVNZ Director-General.
- The Auckland Television Centre in Victoria Street, Auckland begins construction.
- 1 June: TV ONE holds a three-and-a-half-hour special show to celebrate 25 years of New Zealand television.
- 29-30 June: Telethon 1985 is held on TV One, raising over $6,007,722 for the Child and Youth Development Trust.

==== Programme debuts ====
- 1 May – Lucky Luke (TV One)
- 15 May – Postman Pat (TV One)
- 3 July – Jockey School (TV One)
- 30 August – EastEnders (TV One)
- 3 September – Miami Vice (TV One)
- 25 September – Moonfleet (TV One)
- 30 October – The Edison Twins (TV One)
- 2 November – Muppet Babies (TV One)
- 6 November – Butterfly Island (TV One)
- 14 November – The Witches and the Grinnygog (TV One)
- 20 November – The Box of Delights (TV One)
- Undated – Dungeons & Dragons (TV One)
- Undated – SuperTed (TV One)
- Undated – Inspector Gadget (TV One)
- Feltex Television Awards:
  - Best actuality coverage - Decision '84, Malcolm Kemp
  - Best children's programme - Spot On, Judith Thomas
  - Best documentary programme - Gallipoli, Alan Martin
  - Best drama programme - Inside Straight, Peter Muxlow
  - Best entertainment programme - McPhail and Gadsby, Peter Lye
  - Best factual series - Close Up, Mark Westmoreland
  - Best speciality programme - Koha, Ernie Leonard
  - Best director - Inside Straight, Tony Wilson
  - Best actor - Roy Billing
  - Best actress - Helen Morse
  - Best new talent - Philip Gordon
  - Best original music - Heroes, Stephen McCurdy and John Gibson
  - Best new journalist - Genevieve Westcott
  - Best dramatic script - Children of the Dog Star, Ken Catran
  - Stan Hosgood Award - Ken Dorman
  - Excellence in television - Peter Hayden

=== Films ===
- Dangerous Orphans
- Kingpin
- Leave All Fair
- Mr Wrong
- Shaker Run
- Sylvia
- The Lost Tribe
- The Quiet Earth

See: Category:1985 film awards, 1985 in film, List of New Zealand feature films, Cinema of New Zealand, Category:1985 films

== Sport ==
=== Athletics ===
- John Campbell wins his first national title in the men's marathon, clocking 2:17:53 on 27 October in Hamilton, while Carol Raven does the same in the women's championship (2:53:26).

=== Horse racing ===
==== Harness racing ====
- New Zealand Trotting Cup: Borana
- Auckland Trotting Cup: Roydon Glen

=== Shooting ===
- Ballinger Belt – Chester Burt (Ashhurst)

=== Soccer ===
- The Chatham Cup is won by Napier City Rovers who beat North Shore United 3–1 in the final.

== Births ==
- 25 January: Adam Campbell, Australian rules footballer.
- 30 January: David Wikaira-Paul, actor.
- 2 February: Jeff Whittington, murder victim. (d. 1999)
- 25 February: Benji Marshall, rugby league player.
- 18 March (in Australia): Vince Lia, soccer player.
- 10 April: Brad Wilson, cricketer.
- 16 April: Daniel Flynn, cricketer.
- 16 April: Brendon Leonard, rugby player.
- 25 April: Olivia Wensley, lawyer.
- 14 May: Sally Martin, actor.
- 9 June: Richard Kahui, rugby player.
- 19 June: Casey Williams, netball player.
- 22 June: Thomas Leuluai, rugby league player.
- 22 June: Frank Andrews, singer.
- 27 June: Louis Anderson, rugby player.
- 8 July: Ben Roberts, rugby league player.
- 9 July: Bradley-John Watling, cricketer.
- 13 July: Rachel Priest, cricketer.
- 3 August: Sonny Bill Williams, rugby league player.
- 28 August: Shane Christie, rugby union player (d. 2025)
- 28 September: Anton Devcich, cricketer.
- 10 October: Bronson Harrison, rugby league player.
- 16 October: Brent Findlay, cricketer.
- 30 October: Kayla Sharland, field hockey striker.
- 10 November: Elizabeth Ryan, field hockey striker.
- 23 November: Stephen Brett, rugby union player.
- 23 December: Emily Naylor, field hockey midfielder.
- Vicki Lin, television presenter.

Category:1985 births

== Deaths ==
- 1 May: Sir Basil Arthur, politician and speaker of the House of Representatives (died in office).
- 12 May: Sir Edward Sayers, parasitologist.
- 7 July: Ewen Solon, actor.
- 31 July: Murray Chapple, cricketer.
- 16 October: Sir Bruce Levy, botanist.
- 16 December: William H. Pettit, missionary and evangelical church leader.
- 31 December: Mal Matheson, cricketer.

== See also ==
- List of years in New Zealand
- Timeline of New Zealand history
- History of New Zealand
- Military history of New Zealand
- Timeline of the New Zealand environment
- Timeline of New Zealand's links with Antarctica
