= 1983 in New Zealand =

- Decades: 1960s; 1970s; 1980s; 1990s; 2000s
- See also: History of New Zealand; List of years in New Zealand; Timeline of New Zealand history

The following lists events that happened during 1983 in New Zealand.

== Population ==
- Estimated population as of 31 December: 3,264,800.
- Increase since 31 December 1982: 38,000 (1.18%).
- Males per 100 females: 98.6.

== Incumbents ==
=== Regal and viceregal ===
- Head of State – Elizabeth II
- Governor-General – The Hon. Sir David Beattie GCMG GCVO QSO QC.

=== Government ===
The 40th New Zealand Parliament continued. The third National Party government was in power.

- Speaker of the House – Richard Harrison
- Prime Minister – Robert Muldoon
- Deputy Prime Minister – Duncan MacIntyre
- Minister of Finance – Robert Muldoon
- Minister of Foreign Affairs – Warren Cooper
- Chief Justice — Sir Ronald Davison

=== Parliamentary opposition ===
- Leader of the Opposition – David Lange (Labour).
- Social Credit Party – Bruce Beetham

=== Main centre leaders ===
- Mayor of Auckland – Colin Kay then Catherine Tizard
- Mayor of Hamilton – Ross Jansen
- Mayor of Wellington – Michael Fowler then Ian Lawrence
- Mayor of Christchurch – Hamish Hay
- Mayor of Dunedin – Cliff Skeggs

== Events ==
- 1 January – The Closer Economic Relations Free trade agreement between Australia and New Zealand comes into force.
- March – The Prince and Princess of Wales (Charles and Diana) visit New Zealand, bringing their baby son Prince William with them.
- 28 March – Deputy Prime Minister of Australia and Minister for Trade, Lionel Bowen and New Zealand High Commissioner to Australia, Laurie Francis sign the Closer Economic Relations agreement in Canberra, Australia.
- 1 July –
  - Lorraine Downes, Miss New Zealand, is crowned Miss Universe in St. Louis, Missouri, USA.
  - The Official Information Act 1982 replaces the 1951 Official Secrets Act.
- 2 August – the visit of the USS Texas causes protests; it was the last nuclear-armed and powered US warship to visit New Zealand; it was the impetus to the New Zealand Nuclear Free Zone, Disarmament, and Arms Control Act 1987.
- 22 August – The New Zealand Party is launched.
- 1 September – Disappearance (and presumed death) of 14-year-old Kirsa Jensen.
  - The fourth Sweetwaters Music Festival is held near Pukekawa.
  - The visit of the United States nuclear-powered frigate Texas sparks widespread protests.
  - The first $50 notes are put into circulation, filling the large gap between the $20 and $100 notes.

== Arts and literature ==
- Rawiri Paratene wins the Robert Burns Fellowship.

See 1983 in art, 1983 in literature

=== Music ===
==== New Zealand Music Awards ====
Winners are shown first with nominees underneath.

- ALBUM OF THE YEAR DD Smash – Live: Deep in the Heart of Taxes
  - Herbs – Light of the Pacific
  - Dance Exponents – The Legionnaires – Live at Mainstreet
- SINGLE OF THE YEAR DD Smash – "Outlook For Thursday"
  - Monte Video – "Shoop Shoop Diddy Wop Cumma Cumma Wang Dang"
  - Coconut Rough – "Sierra Leone"
- TOP MALE VOCALIST Dave Dobbyn (DD Smash)
  - Malcolm McNeill
  - Monte Video
- TOP FEMALE VOCALIST Suzanne Prentice
  - Trudi Green
  - Patsy
- TOP GROUP OF THE YEAR DD Smash
  - Herbs
  - The Narcs
- MOST PROMISING MALE VOCALIST Andrew Mclennan (Coconut Rough)
  - Dick Driver (Hip Singles)
  - Gary Smith (The Body Electric)
- MOST PROMISING FEMALE VOCALIST Sonya Waters
  - Rhonda Jones
  - Bronwyn Jones (Precious)
- MOST PROMISING GROUP Coconut Rough
  - Hip Singles
  - The Body Electric
- BEST POLYNESIAN ALBUM The Radars – Chulu Chululu
  - Patea Maori Club (featuring Dalvanius) – Poi E
  - Kaiwhaiki Cultural Club – The Valley of Voices Vol 2
- BEST FILM SOUNDTRACK/ CAST RECORDING/ COMPILATION Sharon O'Neill – Smash Palace
  - Schtung – The Scarecrow
  - John Charles – Utu
- BEST MUSIC VIDEO Andrew Shaw – "Outlook For Thursday" (DD Smash)
  - Greg Rood – Sierra Leone (Coconut Rough)
  - Mark Ackerman, Craig Howard – "Shoop Shoop Diddy Wop Cumma Cumma Wang Dang" (Monte Video)
- ENGINEER OF THE YEAR Dave Marett – "Sierra Leone" (Coconut Rough)
  - Graeme Myhre – Live: Deep in the Heart of Taxes (DD Smash)
  - Paul Streekstra – "Outlook For Thursday" (DD Samsh)
- PRODUCER OF THE YEAR Dave Marett – "Sierra Leone" (Coconut Rough)
  - Dave Dobbyn – "Outlook For Thursday" (DD Smash)
  - Monte Video/ Bruce Lynch – "Shoop Shoop Diddy Wop Cumma Cumma Wang Dang" (Monte Video)
- MOST POPULAR SONG Patsy Riggir – "Beautiful Lady"
- MOST POPULAR ARTIST DD Smash
- OUTSTANDING CONTRIBUTION Murray Cammick
- BEST COVER DESIGN Simon & Suzy Clark – Daring Feats
  - Matthew Aitken – The Tin Syndrome
  - Van Heusen/ O'Neill-Joyce – Space Case Two
- CLASSICAL RECORD OF THE YEAR Louise Malloy – Louise
  - Kiri Te Kanawa/ National Youth Choir of New Zealand – Royal Occasion
  - Schools Polyphonics of Wellington – Tenebrae Responsorie 1585
- JAZZ RECORD OF THE YEAR Rodger Fox Big Band – Heavy Company
  - Space Case – Space Case Two
  - Phil Broadhurst – Sustenance
- COUNTRY RECORD OF THE YEAR Suzanne Prentice – When I Dream
  - Patsy Riggir – Are You Lonely
  - Brendan Duggan – Hands on the Wheel

See 1983 in music

=== Performing arts ===
- Benny Award presented by the Variety Artists Club of New Zealand to Russell Middlebrook.

=== Radio and television ===
- 18 June – The final episode of M*A*S*H, "Goodbye, Farewell and Amen", airs on TV One.
- Te Karere becomes a regular Māori language news program.
- Northern Television ceases transmission.
- Feltex Television Awards:
  - Best Television Entertainer: Howard Morrison
  - Best Actor: Michael Haigh on Gliding On
  - Best Actress: Sarah Peirse on A Woman of Good Character
  - Best Drama: Gliding On
  - Best New Talent: Heath Lees on Opus and Kaleidoscope
  - Best Entertainment: McPhail and Gadsby
  - Best Documentary: Wild South – Black Robin
  - Best Information: Country Calendar
  - Best Speciality: Kaleidoscope
  - Best News and Current Affairs: Close Up
  - Best Script: Rowley Habib for The Protesters
  - Steve Hosgood Award for Allied Craft: Errol Samuelson, film sound operator on National History Programmes

See: 1983 in New Zealand television, 1983 in television, List of TVNZ television programming, Category:Television in New Zealand, Category:New Zealand television shows, Public broadcasting in New Zealand

==== Programme debuts ====
- 8 April – Willo the Wisp (TV One)
- 19 July – Sport Billy (TV One)
- 1 October – Emmerdale Farm (TV Two)
- 5 October – Cheers (TV Two)

=== Film ===
- Bad Blood
- Hang on a Minute Mate
- Merry Christmas, Mr. Lawrence
- Patu!
- Strata
- Savage Islands
- Utu

See: Category:1983 film awards, 1983 in film, List of New Zealand feature films, Cinema of New Zealand, Category:1983 films

== Sport ==
=== Athletics ===
- Graham Macky wins his first national title in the men's marathon, clocking 2:21:22 in Mosgiel, while Val Lindsay does the same in the women's championship (3:11:35).

=== Basketball ===
- NBL won by Auckland

=== Cricket ===
- World Series Cup, New Zealand finished first in the preliminary stages of this annual triangular one-day competition in Australia, which in 1982/83 received unprecedented interest and record television audiences. England missed out on a finals berth, with Australia coming qualifying second.

New Zealand's star allrounder, Richard Hadlee, tore a hamstring on the eve of the lucrative and much anticipated finals series with Australia and was forced out of the side. A demoralised New Zealand were then well beaten by the rejuvenated Australians, 2–0. Lance Cairns hit his memorable 6 sixes in front of 71,000 in the second final at the MCG.

Glenn Turner made his long-awaited international comeback in this series after six years of self-imposed exile from the New Zealand team due to a financial disagreement with the NZCC.

In February, New Zealand beat England 3–0 in the Rothmans Cup one-day series in Christchurch, Wellington and Auckland, witnessed by sell-out crowds. Sri Lanka was then beaten in both the test and one-day series at home.

In July history was made when the Geoff Howarth-led side won their first test match against England in England, with a five wicket victory in the second test at Headingley in Leeds. However, they lost the four match series 1–3. Prior to this series, New Zealand played in the 1983 World Cup. In a tough group with both England and Pakistan, New Zealand narrowly missed out on a semi-final place at the World Cup for the first time, after being successful in the two prior tournaments in 1975 and 1979. Glenn Turner retired from international cricket after New Zealand's exit.

=== Horse racing ===
==== Harness racing ====
- New Zealand Trotting Cup: Steel Jaw
- Auckland Trotting Cup: Armalight

==== Thoroughbred racing ====
Kiwi wins a 1983 Melbourne Cup at Flemington in a last-to-first finish in the home straight.

=== Netball ===
- In the 1983 World Netball Tournament, New Zealand finished as runners up. In the tournament deciding match, they lost to Australia 47–42. In New Zealand, the match was broadcast live on Television New Zealand.

=== Shooting ===
- Ballinger Belt – Rex Chilcott (Clevedon)

=== Soccer ===
- New Zealand National Soccer League won by Manurewa
- The Chatham Cup is won by Mount Wellington who beat Gisborne City 2–0 in the final.

== Births ==
- 18 January: George Bridgewater, rower
- 19 January: Glen Moss, association football player
- 24 January: Wyatt Crockett, rugby union player
- 27 January: Dene Halatau, rugby league player
- 8 February James Ryan, (rugby player) Cory Jane, rugby union player
- 13 February: Bradley Shaw, field hockey player
- 1 March: James Mortimer, (athlete) hurdler
- 2 March: Dan Wootton, journalist and broadcaster
- 13 March: Carl Bates, politician
- 16 March: Melody Cooper, field hockey player
- 1 April: Tamati Ellison, rugby union player
- 1 April: Lance Hohaia, rugby league player
- 7 April: Allan Pearce, association football player
- 15 April: Anna Scarlett, netballer
- 25 April: Nick Willis, athlete
- 30 April: David Faiumu, rugby league player
- 5 May: Ben Atiga, rugby union player
- 22 May: Jeremy Christie, association football player
- 6 June: Joe Rokocoko, rugby union player
- 10 June: Gavin Williams, rugby union player
- 17 June: James Dolphin, athlete
- 29 June: Jimmy Gopperth, rugby union player
- 6 July: Brent Fisher, association football player
- 10 August: Rebecca Scown, rower
- 19 August: Tania Nolan, actress
- 28 August: Luke McAlister, rugby union player
- 7 September: Piri Weepu, rugby union player
- 8 September: Toni Street, television presenter and sports commentator
- 15 September: Richard Sherlock, cricketer
- 28 September: John Schwalger, rugby union player
- 17 October: Michelle Ang, actor
- 18 October: Jonny Reid, motor racing driver
- 8 November: Chris Rankin, actor
- 29 November: Jeremy Mayall, composer
- 2 December: Michael Wesley-Smith, actor
- 15 December: Brooke Fraser, singer-songwriter
- 20 December: Aaradhna, hip-hop artist

== Deaths ==
- 7 January: Eliza Amy Hodgson, botanist
- 15 June: Sir William Liley, pioneering surgeon.
- 23 July (in Sydney): Tex Morton, musician.
- 6 August 1983: Patrick Murray, priest, editor, ecumenicist.(born 1931)
- 12 August: Giff Vivian, cricketer.
- 26 October: Edward Blaiklock, academic.
- 29 November: Sir William Stevenson, industrialist and philanthropist.
- 8 December: Sir Keith Holyoake, former Prime Minister.
- 19 December: Lancelot Eric Richdale, ornithologist.

== See also ==
- List of years in New Zealand
- Timeline of New Zealand history
- History of New Zealand
- Military history of New Zealand
- Timeline of the New Zealand environment
- Timeline of New Zealand's links with Antarctica
