= 1984 in New Zealand =

- Decades: 1960s; 1970s; 1980s; 1990s; 2000s
- See also: History of New Zealand; List of years in New Zealand; Timeline of New Zealand history

The following lists events that happened during 1984 in New Zealand.

== Population ==
- Estimated population as of 31 December: 3,293,000.
- Increase since 31 December 1983: 28,200 (0.86%).
- Males per 100 Females: 98.3.

== Incumbents ==
=== Regal and viceregal ===
- Head of State – Elizabeth II
- Governor-General – The Hon Sir David Beattie GCMG GCVO QSO QC.

=== Government ===
The 40th New Zealand Parliament, led by the National Party, concluded, and in the general election the Labour Party was elected in the 41st New Zealand Parliament.

- Speaker of the House – Richard Harrison then Basil Arthur
- Prime Minister – Robert Muldoon then David Lange
- Deputy Prime Minister – Duncan MacIntyre then Jim McLay then Geoffrey Palmer
- Minister of Finance – Robert Muldoon then Roger Douglas
- Minister of Foreign Affairs – Warren Cooper then David Lange
- Chief Justice – Sir Ronald Davison

=== Parliamentary opposition ===
- Leader of the Opposition – David Lange (Labour) until 26 July, then Robert Muldoon (National) until 29 November, then Jim McLay.
- Social Credit Party – Bruce Beetham until 26 July, then not represented in Parliament.

=== Main centre leaders ===
- Mayor of Auckland – Catherine Tizard
- Mayor of Hamilton – Ross Jansen
- Mayor of Wellington – Ian Lawrence
- Mayor of Christchurch – Hamish Hay
- Mayor of Dunedin – Cliff Skeggs

== Events ==
- 27 January – A state of emergency is declared in Southland as record rainfall causes flooding which forces the evacuation of 4000 people and leaves damage totalling $55 million.
- 3–6 February – The fifth Sweetwaters Music Festival is held in Pukekawa, with the satellite Sweetwaters South held in Christchurch on 6 February.
- 6 February – Te Hikoi ki Waitangi march disrupts Waitangi Day celebrations.
- 27 March – A suitcase bomb explodes at the Wellington Trades Hall, killing the caretaker, Ernie Abbott. No arrest has been made, see Terrorism in New Zealand.
- 24 June – New Zealand's first IVF-conceived baby, Amelia Bell, is born at Auckland's National Women's Hospital.
- 14 July – 1984 general election: The Labour Party, led by David Lange, wins 56 of the 95 seats in the House of Representatives. The Fourth Labour Government is formed, ending 9 years of National rule.
- 18 July – Government devalues New Zealand dollar by 20 percent. See New Zealand constitutional crisis, 1984.
- 20 August – New Zealand reestablishes diplomatic relations with Argentina at a consular level.

=== Unknown dates ===
- New Zealand signs the United Nations Convention on the Elimination of All Forms of Discrimination Against Women.
- Auckland's population exceeds that of the South Island.

== Arts and literature ==
- Brian Turner wins the Robert Burns Fellowship.

See 1984 in art, 1984 in literature, Category:1984 books

=== Music ===
==== New Zealand Music Awards ====
Winners are shown first with nominees underneath.

- ALBUM OF THE YEAR Dance Exponents – Prayers be Answered
  - The Mockers – Swear It's True
  - Patsy Riggir – You'll Never Take The Country Out of Me
- SINGLE OF THE YEAR The Narcs – You Took Me Heart and Soul
  - Pātea Māori Club and Dalvanius Prime – "Aku Raukura"
  - Dance Exponents – I'll Say Goodbye (Even Though I'm Blue)
- TOP MALE VOCALIST Jordan Luck (Dance Exponents)
  - Andy Dickson (The Narcs)
  - Andrew Fagan (The Mockers)
- TOP FEMALE VOCALIST Patsy Riggir
  - Jodi Vaughan
  - Suzanne Prentice
- TOP GROUP Dance Exponents
  - The Mockers
  - Pātea Māori Club and Dalvanius Prime
- MOST PROMISING MALE VOCALIST Martin Phillips (The Chills)
  - Ross McKenzie (The Idles)
  - Wayne Gillespie
- MOST PROMISING FEMALE VOCALIST Meryl Yvonne
  - Janice Lampen
  - Sharon Dubont
- MOST PROMISING GROUP The Chills
  - Jive Bombers
  - You're A Movie
- BEST JAZZ ALBUM Brian Smith Quartet – Southern Excursio
  - Ken Avery/ Darktown Strutters – Jazz The Way It Used to Be
  - Rodger Fox – Something Juicy
- BEST COUNTRY ALBUM Patsy Riggir – You'll Never Take the Country Out of Me
  - Suzanne Prentice – So Precious To Me
  - Jodi Vaughn – Rodeo Eyes
- BEST CLASSICAL ALBUM NZSO & Others – Music By Larry Pruden
  - Michael Houston – Michael Houston
  - Schola Musica – NZ Music For Strings
- BEST POLYNESIAN ALBUM Pātea Māori Club & Dalvanius Prime – "Aku Raukura"
  - The Five Stars – Musika Malie (Good Music)
  - Rosalio – Samoan Serenade
- BEST FOLK ALBUM Phil Garland – Springtime in the Mountains
  - Michael Warmuth – Hammered Duclimer
  - Wayne Gillespie – Wayward Son
- PRODUCER OF THE YEAR Dave MCartney – You Took Me Heart & Soul
  - Glyn Tucker Jnr / Trevor Reekie – Swear It's True
  - Glyn Tucker Jnr / Trevor Reekie – You Fascinate
- ENGINEER OF THE YEAR Graham Myhre – You Took Me Heart & Soul
  - Graham Myhre/ Gyn Tucker Jnr – Caught in the Act
  - Glyn Tucker Jnr – You Fascinate
- BEST COVER DESIGN Joe Wylie – Aku Raukura (Pātea Māori Club)
  - Murray Vincent – Music By Larry Purden
  - Mike Hutton – Vocal at the Local
- BEST MUSIC VIDEO Bruce Morrison – I'm in Heaven
  - William Keddell – Elephunk in My Soup
  - Tom Parkinson – I'll Say Goodbye (Even Though I'm Blue) (Dance Exponents)
- BEST FILM SOUNDTRACK Jenny Mcleod – The Silent One
  - Mike Nock – Strata
  - John Charles/ Dave Fraser – Constance
- INTERNATIONAL ACHIEVEMENT Tim Finn
  - Dragon
  - Split Enz
- OUTSTANDING CONTRIBUTION TO THE MUSIC INDUSTRY Eldred Stebbing – (For his Lifelong Contribution to the Recording Arts in New Zealand)
  - Jacqui Fitzgerald
  - Peter Blake & TVNZ
- MOST POPULAR SONG The Narcs – You Took Me Heart and Soul

See: 1984 in music

=== Performing arts ===
- Benny Award presented by the Variety Artists Club of New Zealand to John Maybury Senior.

=== Radio and television ===
See: 1984 in New Zealand television, 1984 in television, List of TVNZ television programming, Category:Television in New Zealand, Category:New Zealand television shows, Public broadcasting in New Zealand

- Feltex Television Awards:
  - Best actuality coverage: The State funeral of Sir Keith Holyoake, Malcolm Kemp
  - Best children's programme: Wild Track, Neil Harraway
  - Best documentary programme: Two Days to Soft Rock Cafe, Ian Taylor
  - Best drama programme: Pioneer Women, Pamela Jones
  - Best entertainment programme: The Michael Fowler Centre Opening Showcase, Malcolm Kemp
  - Best factual series: Close-up, Mark Westmoreland
  - Best speciality programme: Kaleidoscope, Gillian Ewart
  - Best director: Ian Taylor, Two Days to Soft Rock Cafe
  - Best original music: Clive Cockburn, A Town Like . . .
  - Best new talent: Philippa Dann, Viewfinder
  - Best TV entertainer: Billy T. James
  - Best actor: Bruce Allpress, Jocko
  - Best actress: Ginette McDonald, Pioneer Women
  - Best dramatic script: Bruce Mason, The Garlick Thrust
  - Stan Hosgood Award for excellence in allied crafts: Paul Donovan (cameraman), Merv Aitchison (sound operator), Neil Dolman (first assistant), Two Days to Soft Rock Cafe

==== Programme debuts ====
- 12 September – Terrahawks (TV One)

=== Film ===
- Came a Hot Friday
- Constance
- Other Halves
- The Silent One
- Vigil
- The Bounty

See: Category:1984 film awards, 1984 in film, List of New Zealand feature films, Cinema of New Zealand, Category:1984 films

== Sport ==
=== Athletics ===
- Barry Thompson wins his first national title in the men's marathon, clocking 2:19:03 on 25 March in Wanganui, while Mary Belsey does the same in the women's championship (2:41:39).

=== Basketball ===
- NBL won by Wellington.

=== Horse racing ===
==== Harness racing ====
- New Zealand Trotting Cup: Camelot
- Auckland Trotting Cup: Enterprise

=== Olympic Games ===
==== Summer Olympics ====
- New Zealand sends a team of 130 competitors across 18 sports.

Gold	Silver	Bronze	Total
8	1	2	11

==== Winter Olympics ====
- New Zealand sends a team of six alpine skiers.

Gold	Silver	Bronze	Total
0	0	0	0

=== Paralympic Games ===
==== Summer Paralympics ====
Gold	Silver	Bronze	Total
8	10	6	24

==== Winter Paralympics ====
- New Zealand sends a team of eight competitors in one sport.

Gold	Silver	Bronze	Total
1	3	1	5

=== Shooting ===
- Ballinger Belt – Peter Cromwell (Cheltenham)

=== Soccer ===
- New Zealand National Soccer League won by Gisborne City
- The Chatham Cup is won by Manurewa who beat Gisborne City 2–1 in the final.

== Births ==
- 27 January: Vince Mellars, rugby league player.
- 14 February: Jared Wrennall, musician.
- 17 February: Timothy Gudsell, cyclist.
- 21 February: Andy Ellis, rugby union player.
- 25 February: Paul Vodanovich, soccer player.
- 8 March: Ross Taylor, cricketer.
- 16 March: Hosea Gear, rugby union player.
- 25 March: Liam Messam, rugby union and rugby sevens player.
- 2 April: Meryl Cassie, actor.
- 6 April: Stacey Carr, field hockey player.
- 20 April: Fraser Anderson, rugby league player.
- 28 May: Beth Allen, actor.
- 2 June: Jack Afamasaga, rugby league player.
- 6 June: Antonia Prebble, actor.
- 7 June: Jennyfer Jewell, actor.
- 20 June: Jarrod Smith, soccer player.
- 27 June: Emma Lahana, actor.
- 28 June: Evarn Tuimavave, rugby league player.
- 13 July: Gareth Williams, actor
- 14 July: Fleur Saville, actor.
- 6 August: Jesse Ryder, cricketer.
- 12 September: Ben Townley, motocrosser.
- 6 October: Valerie Adams, athlete, Olympic gold medallist (2008 Beijing and 2012 London)
- 23 November: Jerome Ropati, rugby league player.
- 14 December: Keshia Paulse, singer.
- Vicki Lin, television presenter.

Category:1984 births

== Deaths ==
- 23 January: Dean Goffin, composer
- 6 March: Ian Cromb, cricketer
- 20 March: Robin Tait, discus thrower
- 28 April: Sylvia Ashton-Warner, writer and educator
- 13 June: Ken Armstrong, soccer player
- 15 June: Tom Heeney, boxer
- 21 July: Adam Adamson, former mayor of Invercargill
- 13 September: Lois White, painter
- 26 November: Eliot V. Elliott, trade unionist
- 9 December: Guthrie Wilson, novelist and teacher (in Sydney)

== See also ==
- List of years in New Zealand
- Timeline of New Zealand history
- History of New Zealand
- Military history of New Zealand
- Timeline of the New Zealand environment
- Timeline of New Zealand's links with Antarctica
