= Country TV =

- Country: New Zealand

Programming
- Picture format: 16:9 (SDTV)

History
- Launched: 1 October 2008
- Former names: The Country Channel, Country99TV

Links
- Website: Official Site

Country TV is a New Zealand television channel broadcast on channel 081 on Sky Network Television. Country TV aims to provide information and entertainment specifically for New Zealand farmers and the rural community.

The channel was launched on 1 October 2008 on SKY Digital TV channel 099 as The Country Channel. On 1 November 2009 the channel changed its name to Country99TV to more closely align with its target demographic, as viewers and clients were simply calling the channel "Channel 99". On 1 May 2013, the Sky channel number was changed to 081 so the name became Country TV

Country TV offers a variety of programming and its flagship shows are locally produced news, weather and current affairs shows. The news team includes journalists David Beatson, Genevieve Westcott and broadcaster Mark Leishman. The channel also offers short range and long range weather forecasts for New Zealand farmers.

Country TV is privately backed by rural investors and is based in Auckland, New Zealand. It is available by subscription only.

== Programming ==
The channel focuses entirely on programming relating to farming, including farming programs, news, weather, financial information, and reviews of products and services.
