= Frank Torley =

Frank Torley MNZM
- Born: Francis Desmond Torley; 28 February 1941; Dunedin, New Zealand
- Died: 27 March 2016 (aged 75); Wellington, New Zealand
- Occupations: Television presenter, director and producer
- Years active: 1966–2016
- Notable work: Country Calendar; Top Town; A Dog's Show
- Spouse: Jennifer Eva Torley (m. 1966)

Francis Desmond Torley MNZM (28 February 1941 – 27 March 2016) was a New Zealand television reporter and producer, best known for his work on Country Calendar spanning almost 50 years.

== Early life and family ==
Born in Dunedin on 28 February 1941, Torley was raised there and in Timaru and Auckland, where he was educated at Sacred Heart College. He was a farm worker for three years after leaving school, before joining Wright Stephenson as a stock and station agent. He married his wife, Jennifer Eva Torley, in 1966, and the couple went on to have two children.

== Broadcasting career ==
In 1966, Torley joined the New Zealand Broadcasting Corporation in Palmerston North as a rural reporter covering central New Zealand, and made his first contribution to Country Calendar the following year. He continued working on radio and on Country Calendar until 1975, despite moving to Christchurch in 1970. Following the restructuring of the NZBC in 1975, Torley spent 18 months as a newsreader on television in Christchurch, and then became a reporter and director for Country Calendar, based in Wellington. After training as a producer, he became the producer of Country Calendar and head of TVNZ's rural programmes unit in 1981. As well as Country Calendar, Torley produced A Dog's Show, Agri-Tech 2000, and the Young Farmer of the Year finale shows.

For a number of years in the 1980s, Torley was stood down from Country Calendar after he appeared in an advertisement for Wrightsons, which TVNZ deemed to be a conflict of interest. During this period he was producer of the broadcaster's religious programmes and co-presented Top Town with Craig Little.

Torley was named "agricultural communicator of the year" in 1989 by the New Zealand Guild of Agricultural Journalists and Communicators. In the 2003 New Year Honours, Torley was appointed a Member of the New Zealand Order of Merit, for services to television.

In 2005, Torley was replaced by Julian O'Brien as producer of Country Country, becoming the programme's executive producer, while continuing to report and direct items until 2014. He finally retired as the show's narrator in early 2016.

== Death ==
Torley died of cancer in Wellington on 27 March 2016, shortly after Country Calendar celebrated its 50th anniversary on air.
