= Beautiful Lady =

Song by Patsy Riggir

Single by Patsy Riggir

from the album Are You Lonely
- B-side: "Silver Wings"
- Released: 1982
- Studio: Stebbing Studios
- Genre: Country
- Length: 3:29
- Label: Epic
- Songwriter: Patsy Riggir
- Producer: Rob Aickin

"Beautiful Lady" is a country song by New Zealand singer Patsy Riggir. It was self-penned, and released in 1982 as the lead single on Riggir's album Are You Lonely, an album which achieved double platinum status. The song and album were produced by Rob Aickin.

Though the song failed to become a hit when released it was a sleeper hit, becoming Riggir's signature song and a very popular cover for amateur singers countrywide.

The song won Most Popular Song at the 1983 RIANZ New Zealand Music Awards, and Riggir was named Composer of the Year at the same awards. It was also a finalist in the APRA Silver Scroll Awards. In the same year, Riggir was the first country artist to win New Zealand's NEOA Entertainer of the Year award. The song also won Riggir the award for Female Vocalist of the Year at the following year's Country Music Awards of Australia.
