= Jean Watson (writer) =

New Zealand novelist and humanitarian (1933–2014)

Jean Watson ONZM
- Born: Jean Catherine Watson; 28 October 1933; Northland, New Zealand
- Died: 28 December 2014 (aged 81); Wellington, New Zealand
- Education: Victoria University of Wellington
- Occupation: Writer
- Notable work: Stand in the Rain (1966)
- Spouse: Barry Crump
- Relatives: Harry Watson (son)

Jean Catherine Watson (28 October 1933 – 28 December 2014) was a New Zealand novelist and humanitarian. She is notable for her first novel, Stand in the Rain (1966), and for her work with an orphanage in southern India, which is the subject of the documentary Aunty and the Star People. Stand in the Rain is, in part, about her marriage to New Zealand author Barry Crump.

== Early life ==
Watson was born in New Zealand in 1933 and lived on a farm at Mangapai, near Whangārei, during her childhood. She later became a freelance writer in Wellington, where she also earned a degree in religious studies from Victoria University. From 1962, Watson lived with Barry Crump, and they were married for ten years.

== India ==
In the 1980s, (Note: 1984, 1987 or 1989) Watson took a trip to India, where she met a man named Subbiah who was trying to collect funds to open an orphanage. Watson returned home, sold her house, and then used most of the funds to support the creation of an orphanage in Nilakottai, Tamil Nadu. Watson also supported the building of a school and community college in the same area. This story, along with the conflicts she had with Subbiah over the ownership of the orphanage, was covered by the documentary Aunty and the Star People in 2014.

== Writing ==
Stand in the Rain (1966) and Three Sea Stories (1994) both received critical acclaim. However, her other novels, The Balloon Watchers (1975), The World is an Orange and the Sun (1978), Flowers for Happyever: A Prose Lyric (1980) and Address to a King (1986) were paid little attention. As her writing progressed, she included more elements of Vedanta philosophy. She also wrote Karunai Illam: The Story of an Orphanage (1992), a non-fiction account of her time with the orphanage.

== Later life ==
In the 2002 New Year Honours, Watson was appointed Officer of the New Zealand Order of Merit for services to literature and welfare work. Watson died in Wellington of a brain aneurism in December 2014. Her son with Crump, Harry Watson, died in 2025.
