= Lincoln High School, New Zealand =

Lincoln High School
- Te Kura Tuarua o Waihora (Māori)

Location
- 25 Boundary Road; Lincoln 7608; New Zealand; 43°38′8.85″S 172°29′8.45″E

Information
- Type: Secondary (Year 9–13)
- Motto: Seek The Highest Good
- Established: 1959
- Ministry of Education Institution no.: 347
- Principal: Adrian Fastier
- Enrolment: 1,430 (July 2026)
- Socio-economic decile: 10Z
- Website: www.lincoln.school.nz

Lincoln High School is a state co-educational secondary school located in Lincoln in Canterbury's Selwyn District in New Zealand. Serving Years 9 to 13 (12 to 18-year-olds), the school has a roll of 1,430 students as of July 2026.

== Enrolment ==
As of July 2026, Lincoln High School has roll of 1,430 students, of which 167 (11.7%) identify as Māori.

As of 2026, the school has an Equity Index of 423, placing it amongst schools whose students have few socioeconomic barriers to achievement (roughly equivalent to deciles 8 and 9 under the former socio-economic decile system).

== Houses ==
Lincoln High school has a 6 house system, with Īnaka (pink), Mako (blue), Kūaka (orange), Pātiki (red), Kāhu (green), and Kōtare (yellow). These houses also provide the structure for Linc classes, which remain the same for each student throughout their time at Lincoln High.

== Lincoln County Incident ==
Lincoln High School students, staff and parents led by the schools head of art, Tony Brittenden, created the film Lincoln County Incident (1980). It showed at Cannes Film Festival (television section) in 1980 before getting a local screening at the Academy Cinema and finishing the year at the New Zealand Film Festival.

== Notable alumni ==
- Nigel Richards (born 1967), 5-time World Champion Scrabble player
- Ariana Tikao (born 1971), singer, musician and author
- Bill Tuiloma (born 1995), New Zealand footballer
- Mitchell Dunshea (born 1995), rugby union player
- Rachel Smalley (attended 1983–1987), television and radio journalist and presenter
- Sophie Pascoe (attended 2006–2010), Paralympic swimmer and gold medallist (2008 Beijing, 2012 London)
