= Margaret Evans (mayor) =

New Zealand mayor

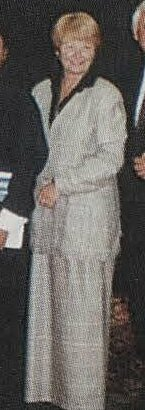
Evans in 1997

Margaret Anne Evans CBE JP (born 31 August 1944) is a New Zealand local-body politician. She was the Mayor of Hamilton, New Zealand from 1989 to 1998, succeeding Ross Jansen.

== Biography ==
Evans was born in Feilding on 31 August 1944, and was educated at New Plymouth Girls' High School. She studied at the University of Waikato in 1964.

First elected to the Hamilton City Council in 1974, Evans was a city councillor until 1989, including a period as deputy mayor from 1983 to 1988. She was elected mayor of Hamilton in 1989. She was also a member of the Auckland Harbour Board between 1986 and 1989, and the Waikato Regional Council from 1989 until 1992. Evans also served on the Waikato Electricity Authority and the Council of the University of Waikato.

Evans was a member of the New Zealand Party, founded by businessman Bob Jones, and she stood unsuccessfully for Parliament in the Hamilton East electorate in the 1984 election.

In 2003 Evans completed a master's thesis at the University of Waikato, on the role of mayor in New Zealand.

== Honours and awards ==
In 1990, Evans received the New Zealand 1990 Commemoration Medal, and in 1993 she was awarded the New Zealand Suffrage Centennial Medal. In the 1995 New Year Honours, Evans was appointed a Commander of the Order of the British Empire, for services to local government.

== Sources ==
- Norton, Clifford (1988). New Zealand Parliamentary Election Results 1946–1987: Occasional Publications No 1, Department of Political Science. Wellington: Victoria University of Wellington. ISBN 0-475-11200-8.
