= Kelly Johnson (actor) =

New Zealand actor

- Born: New Zealand
- Occupation: Actor

Kelly Johnson is a New Zealand former actor. He played lead roles in Goodbye Pork Pie, Hang On a Minute Mate and Carry Me Back. He also featured in Bad Blood, Utu and Battletruck.

Johnson took up acting at 18 with Auckland's Theatre Corporate. His big break came with landing a role in Goodbye Pork Pie. He has moved away from acting and became a criminal lawyer.
