= Harry Watson (New Zealand artist) =

New Zealand artist (1965–2025)

- Born: Arvid McColl Watson; 1965
- Died: 21 June 2025 (aged 59–60)
- Occupation: Artist
- Parents: Jean Watson (mother); Barry Crump (father)

Arvid McColl "Harry" Watson (1965 – 21 June 2025) was a New Zealand artist, playwright, carver and sculptor from the Wairarapa.

Watson was the son of Barry Crump and Jean Watson. He died on 21 June 2025.
