= Dorothy Buchanan (composer) =

New Zealand composer and teacher

Dorothy Quita Buchanan ONZM (born 28 September 1945) is a New Zealand composer and teacher.

== Life ==
Buchanan was born in Christchurch on 28 September 1945, the second of six daughters in a musical family, and was educated at St Mary's College. She graduated with a Bachelor of Music degree from the University of Canterbury in 1967 and a teaching degree from Christchurch Teachers' College in 1975.

She married physician and endocrinologist David Carroll, and the couple went on to have one child.

After completing her education, Buchanan worked as a pianist, composer, music teacher and violinist with the Christchurch Symphony Orchestra.

Buchanan has been active in music education. In 1976 she became New Zealand's first composer-in-schools, remaining in that role until 1993, and has been a guest lecturer, adjudicator, musical director, advisor to teacher support services and an assessor with Creative New Zealand panels. In 1979 she served as president of the Composers’ Association of New Zealand and founded the Christchurch Music Workshops. In 1980 she co-founded the music publishing cooperative Nota Bene, which provides a hire library of music for schools and community use. Buchanan was the composer in residence at the New Zealand Film Archive from 1984 to 1993.

== Honours and awards ==
In 1995 Buchanan was awarded the Philip Neill Memorial Prize by the University of Otago for Fragments and Letters. She has also received an outstanding achievement award from the Composers Association of New Zealand, and the Vernon Griffiths Memorial Award for outstanding musical leadership.

She was awarded the New Zealand Suffrage Centennial Medal in 1993, and in the 2001 New Year Honours she was appointed an Officer of the New Zealand Order of Merit, for services to music.

== Selected works ==
Buchanan composes for school choirs, string quartets, dance and theatre companies and symphony orchestras, operas, incidental music and film and television scores. Selected works include:

- Lincoln County Incident, film soundtrack
- Clio Legacy, opera after Witi Ihimaera
- Woman at the Store, opera after Katherine Mansfield
- The Mansfield Stories, opera after Katherine Mansfield
- The Ancient of Days for voice and piano
