= Patsy Riggir =

New Zealand singer

Patsy Riggir QSM
- Born: Patsy Evelyn Ann Riggir; 6 October 1945 (age 81); Arapuni, New Zealand
- Occupations: Singer; songwriter; TV host

Patsy Evelyn Ann Riggir QSM (/ˈrɪɡər/ RIG-ər; born 6 October 1945) is a New Zealand country and western singer and songwriter. She was a regular performer on the New Zealand Country and Western television show That's Country, had her own show Patsy Riggir Country in 1986, and has appeared on various shows including the Ralph Emery Show, the Fan Fair International Show and the Grand Ole Opry.

== Biography ==
Riggir was born in the South Waikato town of Arapuni, and was educated at Te Kuiti School, and Te Kuiti and Putaruru High Schools. She entered several talent quests and sang on IXH Hamilton aged 5, but then gave up singing until she joined the local country music club in 1974. Her first album, True Country Music, was released in 1980. In 1974, she won the inaugural New Zealand Gold Guitar Award in Gore.

She has received many awards including New Zealand Entertainer of the Year in 1980, various APRA Awards for Best Female Vocalist, Best Song, Best Songwriter etc. and various NZRIA awards. She represented New Zealand at country music gatherings in Fort Worth, Texas in 1983 & 1984, Nashville in 1987, and was inducted into the Tamworth, NSW Hall of Fame in 1982. In the 1994 New Year Honours, Riggir was awarded the Queen's Service Medal for community service. She now lives near Putāruru.

== Discography ==
=== Studio albums ===
Title	Details	Peak chart position
Title	Details	NZ
True Country Music	Released: 1980; Label: Capitol (HSD 1086); Format: LP	31
Lay Down Beside Me	Released: 1981; Label: Epic (ELPS 4275); Format: LP	11
Are You Lonely	Released: 1982; Label: Epic (ELPS 4351); Format: LP, cassette	13
You'll Never Take the Country Out of Me	Released: 1984; Label: Epic (ELPS 4422); Format: LP	22
You Remind Me of a Love Song	Released: 1985; Label: Epic (ELPS 4503); Format: LP	19
Close to Thee	Released: 1986; Label: Epic (ELPS 4583); Format: LP	11
Liberated Lady	Released: 1990; Label: Epic (467445-2); Format: CD	–
Moonlight and Roses	Released: 1992; Label: Epic (472466-2); Format: CD	16
My Little Corner of the World	Released: 1993; Label: Epic (474733-2); Format: CD	36
Never Ending Songs of Love	Released: 2003; Label: Rajon Music Group (RJCD007); Format: CD	–
"—" denotes a recording that did not chart or was not released in that territory.

=== Live albums ===
Title	Details	Peak chart position
Title	Details	NZ
Patsy Riggir Country	Released: 1986; Label: Epic (ELPS 4540); Format: LP	3

=== Compilation albums ===
Title	Details	Peak chart position
Title	Details	NZ
The Best – Plus Four	Released: 1987; Label: Epic (460627-1); Format: LP	–
The Most of Patsy Riggir	Released: 1992; Label: EMI (4354042); Format: CD	–
The Very Best of Patsy Riggir	Released: 2001; Label: EMI (5335772); Format: CD	–
Beautiful Lady: The Very Best of Patsy Riggir	Released: 2013; Label: Sony (88843010282); Format: CD	4
"—" denotes a recording that did not chart or was not released in that territory.

== Awards ==
Riggir was the first winner of Gore's Golden Guitar Awards in 1974

=== Country Music Awards of Australia ===
The Country Music Awards of Australia (CMAA) (also known as the Golden Guitar Awards) is an annual awards night held in January during the Tamworth Country Music Festival, celebrating recording excellence in the Australian country music industry. They have been held annually since 1973.

Year	Nominee / work	Award	Result
1981	"It's Not Love"	New Talent of the Year	Won
1984	"Beautiful Lady"	Female Vocalist of the Year	Won
1985	You'll Never Take the Country Out of Me	Female Vocalist of the Year	Won
1986	You Remind Me of a Love Song	Female Vocalist of the Year	Won
1987	Country	Top Selling	Won

- Note: wins only

=== RIANZ Awards ===
Riggir won a number of RIANZ New Zealand Music Awards. She has had a total of 19 nominations including 7 wins.

Year	Category	Details	Result
1982	Top Female Vocalist		Won
1983	Top Female Vocalist		Nominated
1983	Most Popular Song	"Beautiful Lady"	Won
1983	Country Record of the Year	Are You Lonely	Nominated
1984	Album of the Year	You'll Never Take the Country Out of Me	Won
1984	Top Female Vocalist		Won
1984	Best Country Album	You'll Never Take the Country Out of Me	Won
1985	Best Female Vocalist		Nominated
1985	Best Country Album	You Remind Me Of A Love Song	Won
1986	Album of the Year	Patsy Riggir Country	Nominated
1986	Best Country Album	Patsy Riggir Country	Won
1987	Best Female Vocalist		Nominated
1987	Best Country Album	Close to Thee	Nominated
1987	Best Folk Album	Close to Thee	Nominated
1988	Best Country Album	The Best (Plus Four)	Nominated
1990	Top Female Vocalist		Nominated
1993	Best Female Vocalist		Nominated
1993	Best Country Album	Moonlight and Roses	Nominated
1994	Best Country Album	My Little Corner of the World	Nominated
