= Phillip Leishman =

New Zealand broadcaster (1951–2013)

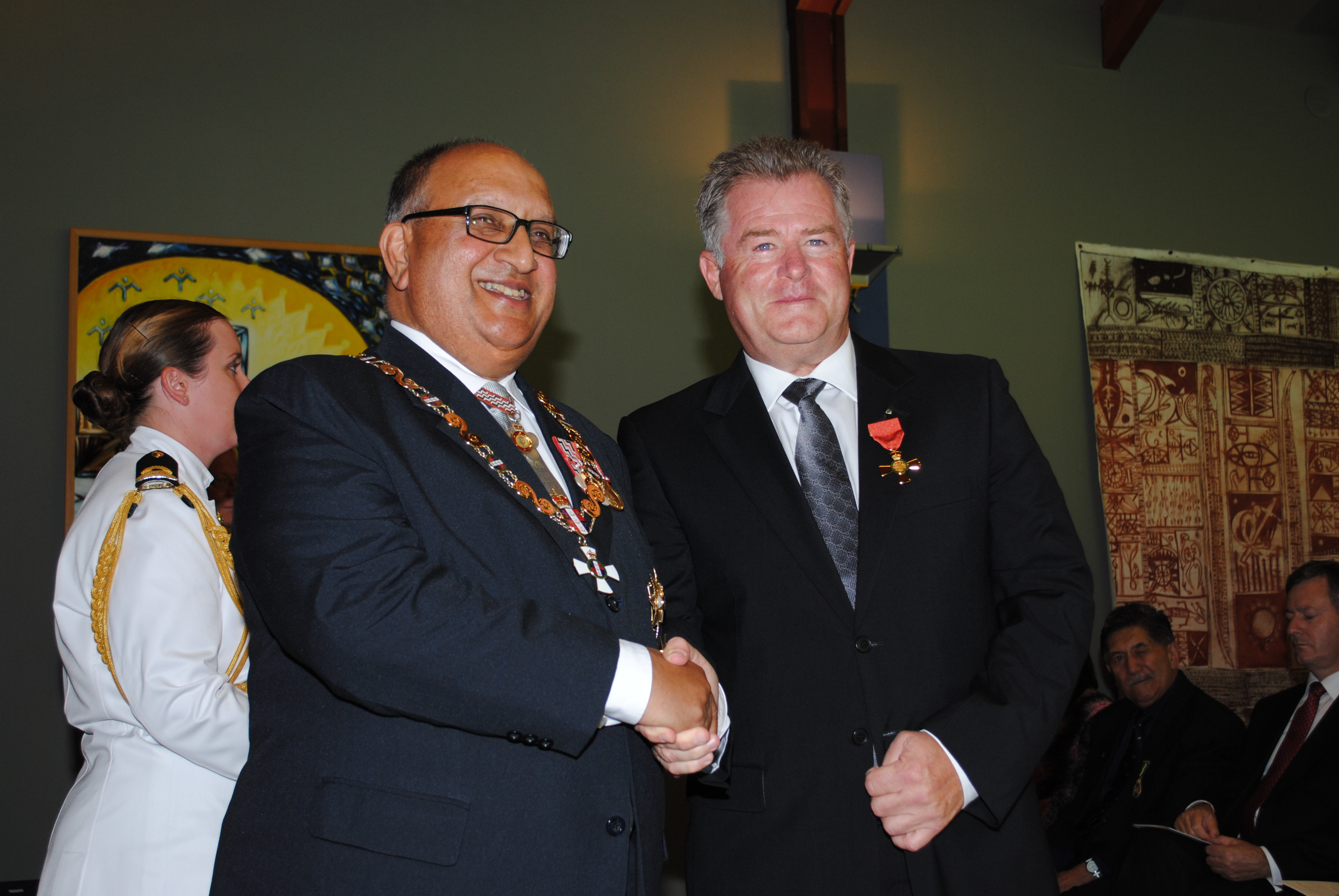
Leishman (right), after his investiture as an Officer of the New Zealand Order of Merit by the governor-general, Sir Anand Satyanand, in 2011

Phillip John Leishman ONZM (9 April 1951 – 25 February 2013) was a New Zealand television broadcaster.

== Biography ==
Born in Timaru in 1951, Leishman was educated at St Patrick's High School (now Roncalli College). He began his broadcasting career on radio in 1970 and first appeared on television in 1971 on DNTV2 in Dunedin, before becoming a sports news presenter for Television New Zealand from 1976 to 1998. In the 1990s, he also hosted 1,250 episodes of the local version of the game show Wheel of Fortune. In the 2011 New Year Honours, he was appointed an Officer of the New Zealand Order of Merit for services to media and the community.

In 1997 Leishman formed a company to produce television golf shows. He presented The Golf Show, which became HSBC Golf Club, from 1998 to 2012. He described the role as probably the most satisfying of his career.

Leishman had surgery for a brain tumour in March 2012. His condition deteriorated and he died at St Heliers, Auckland on 25 February 2013.

His brother Mark Leishman is also a well-known New Zealand television broadcaster.

== See also ==
- List of New Zealand television personalities
