= 1976 Hamilton mayoral by-election =

- 24 April 1976
- Turnout: 19,506 (48.76%)
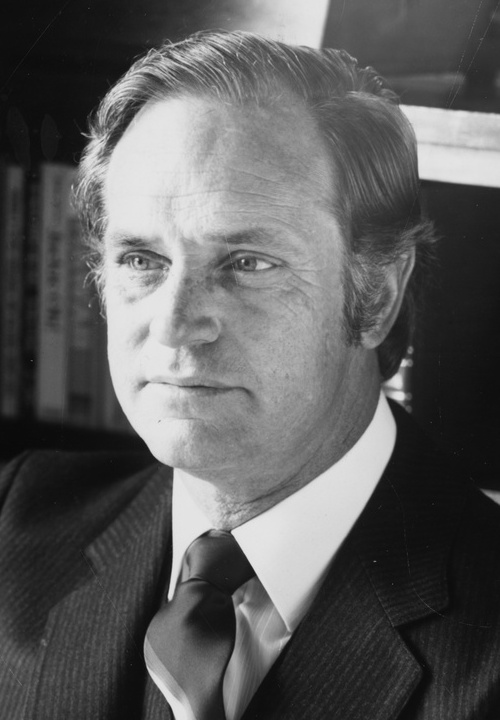

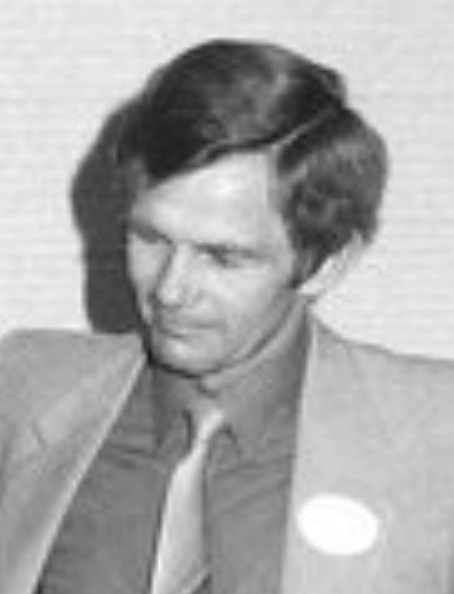
Candidate	Bruce Beetham	Ross Jansen
Party	Independent	Independent
Popular vote	9,743	7,075
Percentage	49.49	36.27
Mayor before election
Mike Minogue
Elected mayor
Bruce Beetham

The 1976 Hamilton mayoral by-election was held to fill the vacant position of Mayor of Hamilton in New Zealand. The polling was conducted using the standard first-past-the-post electoral method.

== Background ==
Incumbent mayor Mike Minogue resigned mid-term after he was elected to parliament as MP for Hamilton West in November 1975. Seven candidates came forward to succeed him. A by-election for a seat on the Hamilton City Council occurred concurrently after the resignation of Ian James Drabble, who had moved outside of Hamilton.

== Candidates ==
Seven candidates were nominated, the largest field of candidates for a mayoral election since 1950. The candidates were:

- Bruce Beetham, A lecturer at Hamilton Teachers' College and leader of the Social Credit Party since 1972. He stood unsuccessfully for the Hamilton City Council in 1971 and the Rangitikei electorate in 1972 and 1975.
- Nicholas Gerardus Buysman, A committee member of the Hamilton Businessmen's Club and past president of the Waikato Restaurant Association. He stood unsuccessfully for the Hamilton City Council in 1971 and 1974. He stood for the mayoralty and council vacancies.
- Ross Jansen, A lawyer who was a Hamilton City Councillor from 1965 to 1974 and deputy mayor from 1971 to 1974. In 1972 he stood as the National Party candidate for Hamilton East.
- Douglas Bruce Mills, A building company director and a Hamilton City Councillor, first elected in 1959. Former mayor Denis Rogers endorsed Mills.
- Archibald Henry Otton, A Welsh-born sheepskin store proprietor and ex-serviceman in the Royal New Zealand Air Force.
- Robert Ivan Peace, A manager of a wine company and president of the New Zealand Wine Resellers' Association. He was a member of the Waikato Electric Power Board and had been a Hamilton City Councillor since 1968.
- Matthew Cowley Te Hira, A motor mechanic and insurance salesman.

== Polling ==
Three telephone polls were conducted.

Poll	Date	Bruce Beetham	Nicholas Buysman	Ross Jansen	Bruce Mills	Ivan Pearce	Matthew Te Hira
The Times	5 April 1976	30.1	–	17.1	1.8	1.4	1.4
The Times	13 April 1976	28.7	–	19.4	1.9	2.3	0.5
The Times	21 April 1976	38.7	0.4	18.1	2.9	1.2	0.8

== Results ==
The race quickly became a two-horse race between Beetham and Jansen. Both were attacked by other candidates for being allegedly partisan given Beetham's status as leader of Social Credit and Jansen's affiliation to the National Party. Both countered by saying they would not politicise the office of mayor. The election resulted in Beetham ultimately winning. May Woodcock, a local schoolteacher, won the vacant council seat. Both Beetham and Woodcock were sworn in officially on 12 May.

=== Mayoral by-election ===
1976 Hamilton Mayoral by-election
Party	Candidate	Votes	%	±%
Independent	Bruce Beetham	9,743	49.49	
Independent	Ross Jansen	7,075	36.27	
Independent	Bruce Mills	1,821	9.33	
Independent	Ivan Peace	581	2.97	
Independent	Matthew Te Hira	166	0.85	
Independent	Nicholas Buysman	53	0.27	
Independent	Archibald Henry Otton	23	0.11	
Informal votes		44	0.22	
Majority		2,668	13.67	
Turnout		19,506	48.76	

=== Council by-election ===
1976 Hamilton City Council by-election
Party	Candidate	Votes	%	±%
Independent	May Woodcock	6,150	31.56	
Independent	Raymond Webster Starr	3,494	17.93	
Independent	Ernest George Grylls	3,368	17.28	
Independent	David John Murray Peart	2,529	12.97	
Independent	Nicholas Buysman	2,086	10.70	
Independent	Gordon Batt	1,179	6.05	
Informal votes		679	3.48	
Majority		2,656	13.63	
Turnout		19,485	48.71	
