= Barry Crump =

New Zealand writer

Barry Crump MBE
- Barry Crump in 1994
- Born: John Barrie Crump; 15 May 1935; Papatoetoe, Auckland, New Zealand
- Died: 3 July 1996 (aged 61)
- Occupation: Novelist

John Barrie Crump MBE (15 May 1935 – 3 July 1996) was a New Zealand author of semi-autobiographical comic novels based on his image as a rugged outdoors man. Taken together his novels have sold more than a million copies domestically. Crump's 1986 work Wild Pork and Watercress was adapted into the 2016 Taika Waititi film Hunt for the Wilderpeople.

== Biography ==
Born in Papatoetoe, Auckland, Crump was the second of six children. His parents were share-milkers who worked in the Taupaki area, and his father was regularly violent towards his wife and children.

Crump worked for many years as a government deer-culler in areas of New Zealand native forest (termed "the bush"). He wrote his first novel, A Good Keen Man, in 1960, based on his experiences as a government hunter. It was a fictional account of a young hunter who has to suffer through a series of hunting partners who are often unsuitable for the job. This novel became one of the most popular in New Zealand history, and Crump's success continued with Hang on a Minute Mate (1961), One of Us (1962), There and Back (1963), Gulf (1964), A Good Keen Girl (1970), Bastards I Have Met (1971), and others, which capitalised on the appeal of his good-natured itinerant self-sufficient characters and an idiomatic "blokey" writing style that he developed after his first book.

In 1969, five children drowned after driving a [Land rover]car into Lake Matahina at a camp that Crump helped to run. Crump was charged with manslaughter over the deaths, but these charges were dropped. Fleur Adcock, one of Crump's ex-wives, said that it was negligence on his behalf that the children died (despite Crump not being present at the camp at the time of the accident).

Crump travelled throughout Australia (where he hunted crocodiles for two years), Europe, Turkey, and India, the result of which was his conversion to the Baháʼí Faith by 1982. In 1988 Crump nearly died from accidentally inhaling cyanide when trapping possums. Towards the end of his life his literary style changed as he wrote children's stories featuring characters he created; vis the Pungapeople.

Crump was also well known for appearing in a series of acclaimed New Zealand television advertisements for Toyota's four-wheel drive Hilux utes, which relied on his image as a stalwart "bushman". The ads aired between 1982 and 1995. He played an archetypal Kiwi bloke in the 1964 New Zealand film Runaway.

Crump's song, "Side By Side", featuring his "sidekick" Scotty (broadcaster Lloyd Scott), was used as the theme song for Team New Zealand in the America's Cup. Crump was awarded the New Zealand 1990 Commemoration Medal in 1990, and was appointed a Member of the Order of the British Empire in the 1994 New Year Honours, for services to literature and the community.

Crump was featured on a New Zealand $1.00 postage stamp in 1995 as part of the "Famous New Zealanders" issue.

== Personal life and death ==
He married five times. His wives were (1) Martina (Tina) Anso (1957–60), (2) poet Fleur Adcock (1962), (3) Vanda Hill (1969–79), (4) Robin Hughes (later known as Robin Lee-Robinson (1979–91), and (5) Margaret (Maggie) Nicholson (1993–96). Additionally he had relationships with Jean Watson (writer) (1962–69), and photographer Ans Westra (c. 1964–5). His children with these women were Ivan (b. 1958), & Martin (b. 1959) (Anso), Stephen (b. 1960), & Harry (b. 1965) (Watson), Lyall (b. 1970) (Hill), and Erik (b. 1965) (Westra). Crump died in 1996 of a suspected aortic aneurysm. At the time of his death he was living at Ohauiti with his wife Maggie. One of his sons, Martin Crump, is now a well-known radio broadcaster.

Posthumously, Crump was accused by ex-wife Fleur Adcock of regularly engaging in violence against herself and his subsequent wives, describing him as a "sadist." In 2004, Crump's fourth wife, Robin Lee-Robinson, published In Salting the Gravy, a memoir of her marriage to Crump that described her abuse at his hands. In 2016, Lee-Robinson claimed that she was the one who had come up with the plot outline for Crump's novel Wild Pork and Watercress, because Crump "wasn't getting on with writing the book" after having thought of the basic premise for it. Lee-Robinson made the allegation several days after the New Zealand premiere of the book's film adaptation, Hunt for the Wilderpeople; she stated that she was disappointed "not to be mentioned at all" in the film's credits. She had not previously mentioned any claim of part-authorship while Crump was alive and has not claimed to have actually written any part of the novel itself. Crump's son, Martin, said that Crump often borrowed ideas from people, but denied this instance until Lee-Robinson could provide proof.

== Bibliography ==
The following titles were written by Crump. First year of publication given but excludes later reprints and omnibus collections.

- A Good Keen Man (1960)
- Hang on a Minute Mate (1961)
- One of Us (1962). 1992 Edition has different material on last few pages
- There and Back (1963)

Stories from Hang on a Minute Mate, One of Us and There and Back were filmed as Hang On a Minute Mate

- Gulf (1964) Later published as "Crocodile Country" (1990)
- Scrapwagon (1965)
- The Odd Spot of Bother (1967)
- No Reference Intended (1968)
- Warm Beer And Other Stories (1969)
- A Good Keen Girl (1970)
- Bastards I Have Met (1971). 1990 Edition has additional material taken from "Fred" below.
- Fred (1972)
- Shorty (1980)
- Puha Road (1982)
- The Adventures of Sam Cash (1985). A selection from earlier books (Hang On A Minute Mate) and (There and Back.)
- Wild Pork and Watercress (1986); Filmed by Taika Waititi as Hunt for the Wilderpeople
- Bedtime Yarns (1988)
- Bullock Creek (1989)
- The Life and Times of a Good Keen Man (1992) (autobiography part 1)
- Gold and Greenstone (1993)
- Arty and the Fox (1994)
- Forty Yarns and a Song (1995) (autobiography part 2)
- Mrs Windyflax and the Pungapeople (1995)
- Crumpy's Campfire Companion (1996) (autobiography part 3)
- As The Saying Goes (1996)
- Song of a Drifter (1996)
- Back Down The Track (1998)
- The Pungapeople of Ninety Mile Beach (1999)
- Harry Hobnail and the Pungapeople (2002)
- Mr Tanglewood and the Pungapeople (2005)
- Tribute to Crumpy (1997), selection of his poems and prose, but mostly a tribute by other persons.
- Professor Pingwit and the Pungapeople (2009)

== Books about Barry Crump ==
Stand In The Rain is a novel written by Jean Watson which was in part based on her relationship with Crump (1965).

A Tribute To Crumpy; Barry Crump 1935–1996, Various Authors (1996).

The Old Dynamite Shack, by George Johnston (1999).

A Life in Loose Strides; The Story of Barry Crump, by Colin Hogg (2000).

The Hermit of Cemetery Island, by George Johnston (2002).

In Endless Fear; A True Story, by Colin Crump (2002).

In Salting the Gravy; A Tale of a Twelve Year Marriage to Barry Crump, by Robin Lee-Robinson (2004).

Sons of a Good Keen Man, by the six sons of Barry Crump (2022).

== Books connected to Barry Crump ==
Barry Crump's father, Wally Crump, wrote a book titled "McDunnit Dunnit" which was published in New Zealand in 1964.

A young Barry Crump appears as a main character in the book Stag Party (1964) by Canadian author Ron Helmer. The book is a memoir of the author's time spent living with a group of deer cullers in the Urewera.

== See also ==
- New Zealand literature
- Hunting in New Zealand
