= Mark Leishman =

New Zealand broadcaster

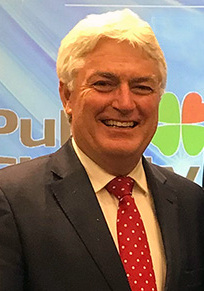
- Leishman in 2017
- Born: Gerard Mark Leishman; 25 May 1956 (age 69); Timaru, New Zealand
- Occupations: Radio and television presenter
- Years active: 1981–present

Gerard Mark Leishman (born 25 May 1956) is a New Zealand radio and television presenter, director and producer. He has been the host of popular television shows in New Zealand including Top Town, Sunday Grandstand and Tux Wonder Dogs. He was the breakfast host on the Magic radio network, from 15 April 2015 to 9 December 2022 and also news editor and presenter of The Daily Report, an agribusiness news show on Country TV. He also hosted a half hour long form interview series called Point of View on Country TV. As of 2023, he is a newsreader and fill-in host for Radio New Zealand.

== Career ==
Leishman studied journalism at Wellington Polytechnic, and began his career in 1977 in the news room at Radio Avon in Christchurch.

Leishman has been the producer and presenter of numerous television series, among them Top Town, Tux Wonder Dogs, Jeopardy!, The Great New Zealand Spelling Bee, Mud and Glory, and for 16 years host and co-producer (with his wife Jo Raymond) of The FMG Young Farmer Contest. He has also produced and directed a number of television documentaries, Many of his appearances on screen have been as presenter of entertainment shows and sports broadcasts. He was co-host of Holden Golf World on Sky Sport 1 with Laura McGoldrick. He was the first announcer on the Magic Breakfast radio show, which went first went to air on 15 April 2015 on the Magic radio network. and hosted his final show on 9 December 2022. He had previously presented the afternoon drive show (2006–2015) on The Breeze radio network.

In 2017, Leishman was presented with a Scroll of Honour from the Variety Artists Club of New Zealand for his contribution to the New Zealand entertainment industry.

=== Programme list ===
1981–1984	TV One Continuity TVNZ	
1985–1987	Today Tonight	
1986–1989	Telequest (Talent Show Live)	
1986–1989	Top Town	
1988	Round Australia Yacht Race Peter Blake	
1988–1989	That's Fairly Interesting	
1988	This Week in Brisbane (Expo)	
1990	Auckland Commonwealth Games (reporter)	
1990–1991	Mud n Glory	
1992–1993	ONE World of Sport (Rugby NZs Big Game)	
1992	Jeopardy (120 episodes)	
1992	This Week in San Diego (America's Cup)	
1992	The Paradise Picture Show	
1993–1999	Tux Wonder Dogs & 2004–2005 (series 8–9)	D
1999	Battle of the Ballroom	D
2000	Tux Super Dogs Challenge	D
2005–2006	The Golf Club	
2001–2016	Young Farmer Contest	D
2003	Life in Pacifica (travel series for Travel Channel USA)	
2004	The Road to Athens (Olympics)	
2005	A Dog's Life	D
2006	The Great NZ Spelling Bee	
2008–2010	Jim's Car Show	
2010–2013	Road to the Young Farmer	D
2013–2016	Holden Golf World	
2008–2022	Country TV (news presenter / producer)	
2014–2022	Point of View (Agri Interview Show)	

Documentaries all for Dexterity D

- A Friend For Life
- Kohi: A Guide To Life
- Coming Out of the Dark
- Reaching For The Stars
- A Different Beat - A Police Dog Story

Communicado Inflight Entertainment for Continental Airlines

== Personal life ==
Leishman married Jo Raymond, at Sacred Heart Basilica, Timaru, on 15 December 1990, and the couple have three children. Leishman's brother Phillip (1951–2013) was also a well-known New Zealand television broadcaster.

== See also ==
- List of New Zealand television personalities
