= The Tigers (New Zealand band) =

New Zealand rock band

- Origin: Wellington, New Zealand
- Genres: Rock
- Labels: EMI
- Past members: Barry Saunders; Wayne Mason; Nick Theobald; Mike Knapp; Steve Lunn

The Tigers was a four-piece rock band from Wellington, New Zealand.

The band was formed in 1980, and secured performance slots including the Sweetwaters Music Festival while touring the North Island of New Zealand between 1980 and 1981.

The single Heart Don't Stop was memorable for the provocative image of a naked breast full size on a gloss cover. Their next single, Red Dress received live performances around New Zealand.

== Band members ==
- Barry Saunders (vocals/guitar)
- Wayne Mason (keyboards/vocals)
- Nick Theobald (bass Guitar/vocals)
- Mike Knapp (drums/vocals)
- Steve Lunn (guitar/saxophone)

== Discography ==
=== Singles ===
Year	Title	Written By	Label	NZ Singles Chart	Certification
1980	"Red Dress"		EMI	#28 (NZ)	–
1980	"All Night"	Barry Saunders	EMI	(NZ)	–
1980	"You Cheated Me (B Side)"	Nick Theobold	EMI	(NZ)	–
1981	"Heart Don't Stop"			#28 (NZ)	

=== Album ===
Year	Title	Track Listing (time)	Label	NZ Album Chart	Certification
1981	"Tigers"	Please be mine (3:45) Say these words (3:15) On any weekend (3:10) Adults only (3:12) Tony (3:25) Don't wanna go home (3:15) All night (3:35) Let's get started (3:10) Heart don't stop (3:12) You cheated me (2:45) Little Misty (4:15)	EMI	(NZ)	-
