= Clare Westcott =

Canadian political consultant (1924–2025)

Clarence William Howard Westcott (June 17, 1924 – April 1, 2025) was a long-time political aide to Ontario Premier Bill Davis and subsequently served as chairman of the Metropolitan Toronto Police Commission. One of his nine children was the late Canadian-New Zealand journalist Genevieve Westcott.

== Life and career ==
Westcott grew up in Seaforth, Ontario where his father ran a jewellery and watch repair shop. He left school in grade 10. He got a job working as a lineman with Ontario Hydro and worked for them until an accident in 1946 resulted in his seeking a new line of work. "I struck a bolt with a hammer, causing a sliver of steel to fly into my left eye", blinding him in that eye, recalled Westcott decades later. It was not until 1995 that an operation restored his sight in that eye.

Having previously worked for the weekly Seaforth News, he got a job with the Toronto Telegram but was fired after two days when he informed his boss he wouldn't work weekends so that he could return to Seaforth, Ontario with his wife and baby son. He got a job with a brokerage firm and got into political organizing for premier Leslie Frost. He was eventually hired by energy minister, Robert Macaulay becoming his executive assistant.

In the 1960s he was appointed to the Board of Governors of Ryerson Polytechnical Institute. He would go on to receive an Honorary Degree for Public Administration, among the many awards and accolades he has received throughout his career.

In 1981, Clare Westcott received the Benemerenti Medal from Pope John Paul II, for his lifelong commitment and contribution to public service and education.

He co-founded and operated an organization for many years throughout his career and into his retirement that would reclaim used and unwanted government surplus - from school books and desks, ambulances and medical equipment and whatever could be recycled as useful to those without. He organized shipments for the delivery of these items via the Canadian Forces training flights, mostly to the Caribbean and Central America.

He worked for Bill Davis in the 1960s when he was Education Minister and was instrumental in the creation and set up of the Ontario community college system and the Ontario Science Centre. When Davis became Premier of Ontario in 1971, Westcott moved with him becoming Executive Assistant - with the rank of Deputy Minister - to the Premier of Ontario, a position he held until 1985 when Davis retired.

In 1985, he was appointed to the Metropolitan Toronto Police Commission becoming its chairman. During his term he helped set up the Crime Stoppers program. and was well-known as the 'Peoples' Commissioner, earning the utmost respect and commitment throughout the force.

Westcott then was appointed to the National Parole Board for several years before becoming special assistant to federal Minister of International Trade Michael Wilson until 1993 when he was appointed a citizenship court judge in Scarborough, remaining in the position until his (final) retirement in 1998.

=== Personal life and death ===
Westcott married Virginia McNamara and had nine children. She died in 2019, aged 92. Westcott died at his home in Scarborough, Ontario on April 1, 2025, at the age of 100.

== Sources ==
- Clare Westcott profile

Preceded by Philip Givens; 1977–1985	Metropolitan Toronto Police Commission Chairman; 1985–1988	Succeeded by June Rowlands; 1988–1991
