= Russell Ward (skeleton racer) =

New Zealand skeleton racer

Russell Ward (born 30 August 1982) is a New Zealand male skeleton racer, who has competed as an individual and member of the New Zealand team at World Cup level. He is currently coaching the New Zealand men's skeleton team.

== World Cup 2005/2006 results ==
- 36th on 10 November 2005, Calgary
- DNS on 17 November 2005, Lake Placid, New York
