= Rob Aickin =

New Zealand record producer

Rob Aickin was New Zealand's top record producer in the late 70's early 80s. He produced many gold and platinum records for artists like, Patsy Riggir, Hello Sailor, Golden Harvest, Th Dudes With Dave Dobbyn, Toni Williams, Murray Grindlay and many others while working for Stebbing Recording studios.

== Career ==
=== 1960s ===
In the early 1960s, he was in a band from an Auckland called Papakura. The band was called Four Quarters. Later he was bass player in a group from Clevedon, just outside of Auckland called The Clevedonaires. Other members were Ron and Graham Brown on guitar and drums and sister Gaye playing keyboards. In 1966, they were signed by Benny Levin to his record label, Impact. After releasing a few singles they were set to go to Vietnam to entertain the troops. As the Vietnam War was escalating their promoter didn't guarantee them return tickets. So they went to Australia instead. They did quite well and eventually became a group called Bitch. Aickin came back to New Zealand in the mid-1970s.

In 2015, he was interviewed for the NZ Musician magazine about his days with The Clevdonaires and Bitch. It was published in the June/July issue.

== Producer ==
Rob Aickin was the "in house" producer at Stebbing Studios in Auckland.

In 1978, he won the Producer of the year award for the Hello Sailor album by Hello Sailor.

== Production ==
EP and mini albums
Artist	Title	Release info	Year	Notes
Gary Havoc & The Hurricanes	Havoc!	RTC RTS 71012	1979	Co-produced with Gary Havoc
Th'Dudes	So You Wanna Be A Rock'n'Roll Star	Key L 20041	1982	
Hello Sailor	Last Chance To Dance	Key L 20042; Festival Records L 20042	1982	

Albums
Artist	Title	Release info	Year	Notes
Hello Sailor	Hello Sailor	Key L 36336	1977	
Murray Grindlay	Murray Grindlay	Key KK4	1977	
Toni Williams	The One I Sing My Love To	Interfusion L-36339	1977	
Golden Harvest	Golden Harvest	Key L 36681	1978	
Hello Sailor	Pacifica Amour	Key L 36682	1978	
Th'Dudes	Right First Time	Key L 36685	1979	
Patsy Riggir	Lay down beside me & Are you lonely	EPIC	1981	Both albums made Gold & Platinum sales
Th'Dudes / Hello Sailor	So You Wanna Be A Rock 'N' Roll Star / Last Chance To Dance	Key D 30560	1991	CD compilation Production: Ian Morris (tracks: 1 to 12); Production: Rob Aicken (tracks: 1 to 4, 6 to 11)
Hello Sailor	The Sailor Story 1975-1996	Festival Records D 31672	1996	2 x CD compilation
Various artists	Give It A Whirl (The Soundtrack To The Major Television Series)	Propeller REV504; Universal New Zealand 99632	2003	2 x CD compilation Producer on, Hello Sailor - "I'm A Texan"; Th'Dudes - "Right First Time"
