= Murder of Jeff Whittington =

1999 murder in Wellington, New Zealand

Jeff Ryan Whittington (2 February 1985 – 9 May 1999) was a 14-year-old murdered by two men in an anti-gay hate crime in Wellington, New Zealand. Whittington was beaten by Jason Morris Meads and Stephen Smith, suffering severe facial injuries and perforated bowels. After being taken to the hospital, he died of brain swelling. At the time of his death, Whittington had dyed his hair purple and was wearing fluorescent green nail polish.

== Description ==
At 4.20am on 8 May 1999, Whittington was found lying apparently unconscious by a police officer on Vivian Street in Wellington. The police officer believed that Whittington was drunk, picked him up and asked if he was alright. Whittington assured the officer that he did not need assistance and was on his way home. The officer left Whittington and did not report the boy to police headquarters.

Whittington was found by two passersby in Inverlochy Place at 4.40am, beaten and with head injuries. Ambulance staff attempted to resuscitate Whittington during the trip to Wellington Hospital, but were unsuccessful. Whittington died on the morning of 9 May in the intensive care unit of Wellington Hospital.

An autopsy completed on 10 May revealed that Whittington's injuries were not accidental. He had suffered head injuries and a perforated bowel. Datura and alcohol were found in his blood. Police started a homicide investigation.

On 11 May, two men came forward to give statements to police regarding Whittington's beating and death. They were arrested by police and charged with Whittington's murder. The accused were Jason Morris Meads (aged 25, unemployed) and Stephen Smith (aged 27, unemployed).

== Trial ==
The Crown prosecutor alleged that shortly after the police officer left Whittington at 4.20am, Meads and Smith stopped and offered him a ride home. Instead, Meads and Smith drove Whittington to Inverlochy Place, dragged him out of the car and assaulted him with blows to the head and body.

One of the witnesses who found Whittington after the assault testified that he was kneeling by the side of the road with his arms outstretched. His nose and upper lip were smashed in. Whittington was asked if he needed help. Whittington appeared to become distressed but was unable to speak. The witness and a friend woke a local resident and asked them to call the police. After some time they realised the resident had gone back to bed. They successfully called for an ambulance at another flat. When cross-examined by the defence, the witness agreed that Whittington was waving his arms about and appeared "trippy".

A witness claimed that Meads and Smith told him on the morning of Whittington's attack "something about how they fucked up a faggot and they left him for dead". When the witness asked if they had really beaten him and left him for dead, Meads replied "The faggot was bleeding out of places I have never seen before".

Another witness testified that he had also seen Meads and Smith on the morning of Whittington's murder. He told the court "They were talking about beating someone". Asked by the Crown prosecutor how Meads and Smith had appeared that morning, McCurly said "They had been drinking so they were quite happy".

The pathologist testified that Whittington had died from swelling of the brain caused by multiple blows to the head. Imprints from a boot or shoe were found in Whittington's head, suggesting that Whittington was kicked in the head repeatedly. Whittington also suffered from a perforated small intestine, consistent with a strong blow to the abdomen. Under cross-examination, Thomson agreed that some of the injury to Whittington's head could have been caused by a fall, but not all of it.

The defence argued that Meads and Smith had not intended to kill Whittington, and that therefore they should be found guilty of manslaughter rather than murder. However, Crown prosecutor Kenneth Stone argued that the blows to Whittington's head indicated the accused were intent on seriously injuring him and this should be taken into account by the jury. Smith, in a statement to police, claimed that Meads had jumped up and down on Whittington's head. Smith also admitted to kicking Whittington a few times. He told his sister that he thought they might have killed Whittington.

Meads told his father he had attacked Whittington, "You know that young boy that was killed? I did it. I didn't mean to do it. I'm so sorry."

The defence argued that because Whittington had consumed datura earlier that morning, he might have been difficult and combative. This, they argued, could have led to a confrontation between Whittington, Smith and Meads leading to an assault. This would have differed from the Crown's account of Whittington's attack which they characterised as a prolonged brutal assault.

On 3 December 1999, after deliberating for nine hours, a High Court of New Zealand jury found Meads and Smith guilty of murdering Whittington. The judge sentenced both men to life imprisonment. On 7 March 2011 Jason Meads was paroled despite being deemed a "high risk for reoffending".

== Aftermath ==
The 2007 play by Ronald Nelson, Corner 4am and Cuba, was based on this event.

== See also ==
- Violence against LGBT people
