= Stu Mills =

New Zealand cricketer (born 1982)

Stuart Michael Mills (born 22 June 1982) is a New Zealand cricketer who played for the Wellington Firebirds and also played for Wellington City in the Hawke Cup.
