= Michael Davidson (cricketer, born 1981) =

New Zealand cricketer (born 1981)

Michael Philip Forbes Davidson (born 24 September 1981 in Christchurch) is a New Zealand cricketer who plays for the Canterbury Wizards in the State Championship.
