= Harold David London =

New Zealand public servant, philatelist, cycling administrator, editor, and historian

Harold David London (28 August 1906 – 29 March 1980) was a New Zealand public servant, philatelist, cycling administrator, editor and local historian. He was born in Kimbolton, Manawatu/Horowhenua, New Zealand on 28 August 1906.
