= Brent Findlay =

New Zealand cricketer (born 1985)

Personal information
- Full name: Brent Robert Findlay
- Born: 16 October 1985 (age 41); Rangiora, New Zealand
- Batting: Right-handed
- Bowling: Right arm medium

Domestic team information
- Years: Team
- 2005/06–2012/13: Canterbury

Career statistics
Competition	FC	LA	T20
Matches	3	15	5
Runs scored	83	96	49
Batting average	13.83	9.60	49.00
100s/50s	0/0	0/0	0/0
Top score	45	28	26
Balls bowled	264	270	72
Wickets	5	5	5
Bowling average	39.80	59.00	16.20
5 wickets in innings	0	0	0
10 wickets in match	0	0	0
Best bowling	2/57	2/35	2/10
Catches/stumpings	4/–	2/–	1/–
- Source: Cricinfo, 9 May 2022

Brent Robert Findlay (born 16 October 1985) is a New Zealand cricketer. He was born in Rangiora. He attended St. Andrew's College, Christchurch and played in the Under-19 Cricket World Cup in 2004 and plays for Canterbury in State Championship competition. He is currently playing in England during the English summer for Kimberley Institute Cricket Club who are based in Nottingham. Brent also spent much of the 2005 season with Kimberley.
