= 25 Years (TV programme) =

25 Years was a three-and-a-half-hour television special that began at 7:30pm, June 1, 1985, on Television New Zealand's TV ONE channel.

The special was held to celebrate the 25th anniversary of television in New Zealand and was hosted by a variety of well known New Zealand celebrities, both past and present, particularly Dougal Stevenson. The special was memorable for the return to TV of three New Zealand television icons - Ginette McDonald (as her alter ego Lyn Of Tawa) and the return of the cast of South Pacific Television's highly successful comedy series A Week Of It starring lead comedians David McPhail and Jon Gadsby.

At the time 25 Years was the first programme to be given a 3hr time slot, although eventually it ran overtime to three and a half hours.

== DVD and Video ==
To date, Television New Zealand has not released the special on either video or DVD. Bootleg copies were sold through newspaper classifieds in the 80's, but are nowadays harder to find.

== Book ==
Later in the year a highly successful book, New Zealand Television: The First 25 Years (Reed Methuen, 1985, ISBN 978-0474000102) was released written by Robert Boyd-Bell and detailed the full history of television in the country. The book also contained many photos and featured the various network I.D.'s.

The book can be found nowadays in second hand bookstores.
