= Carry Me Back (film) =

- Directed by: John Reid
- Written by: Keith Aberdein; Derek Morton; John Reid
- Produced by: Graeme Cowley
- Starring: Grant Tilly; Kelly Johnson
- Cinematography: Graeme Cowley
- Edited by: Michael Horton; Simon Reece
- Music by: Tim Bridgewater; James Hall
- Production company: Kiwi Film Productions
- Release date: May 21, 1982
- Running time: 102 min
- Country: New Zealand
- Language: English
- Budget: $600,000

Carry Me Back is a 1982 New Zealand comedy film. It was directed by John Reid and written by Keith Aberdein, Derek Morton and John Reid based on a story by Joy Cowley. It showed at Cannes Film Festival and Sydney festival ahead of a local cinema release in September 1982.

== Synopsis ==
When T.K. dies his two sons must return his body to his farm before anyone realises he has died.

== Cast ==
- Grant Tilly as Arthur Donovan
- Kelly Johnson as Jimmy Donovan
- Dorothy McKegg as Aunty Bird
- Derek Hardwick as Tom 'T.K.' Donovan

== Reception ==
Helen Martin in New Zealand film, 1912-1996 says "Told in a manner reminiscent of the Ealing comedies, the story, enlivened by a subplot involving an escaped prisoner, romps along at a cracking pace." Hans Petrovic of The Press said "In some ways, "Carry Me Back" is reminiscent of Hitchcock's "The Trouble With Harry" and Polanski's "Two Men in a Wardrobe." but its saving grace are its many touches of New Zealand humour." Liz Jacka in Filmnews writes "Carry Me Back is an enjoyable and funny film, due in no small part to the superb playing of Grant Tilly, an extremely skilful and subtle comedian. But the gentleness of the humour and the likeableness of the characters is finally uncomfortable because it wins the audience over to a celebration of its versions of New Zealand manhood, the footballer and the farmer." Nicholas Reid said in A Decade of New Zealand Film "Very bad misfire. Generally unfunny attempt to combine gallows humour with raw backblocks characters. Grant Tilly's last desperate address to the corpse, and Dorothy McKegg's wonderful caricature of a grasping harridan ('Aunty Bird') are its only real assets."
