= 1981 New Zealand floods =

Natural disaster in New Zealand

- Date: 11–16 April 1981
- Location: Waikato
- Property damage: equivalent to $38,242,704 in 2026

Between 11 and 16 April 1981, the Waikato experienced flooding due to high levels of rain and wind. It mostly affected the Thames-Coromandel area and Paeroa. Over 2,250 evacuations took place. Insurance payouts cost $7,000,000 (equivalent to $38,242,704 in 2026). Over 200 homes were flooded.

Worst areas affected by the flooding were around Paeroa, Thames, Waikino, Hikutaia, Wharepoa, Puriri and Matatoki. Between 7 and 10 thousand hectares of farmland were flooded between Paeroa and Thames. At the time, it was the worst flooding recorded in the Coromandel.

== History ==
On 5:39pm 12 April a civil emergency was declared in the Paeroa Borough and Ohinemuri County, and ended on 21 April. Another civil emergency was declared between 13 April and 16 April. On the night of 12 April over 15,000 sandbags were piled against a stopbank of the Ohinemuri River. They were also used to make dams around shops.

The Waikato experienced torrential rain on 12 and 13 April, causing flooding throughout the region. On the night of 12 April, "Highway 25 south of Coroglen and south of Whangamata was closed on the night of the 12th as was Highway 2 between Paeroa and Waihi at Queen's Head." Between 13 and 14 April, west Auckland had no power. On the 13th, 11 boats, mostly large yachts were found on the rocks of the Auckland waterfront.

"Paeroa recorded 197.9 mm (19.79 cm) of rain in 24 hours from the 12th to the 13th. Paeroa recorded 375.8 mm (37.58 cm) of rain in 72 hours from the 11th to the 14th (which has a return period of over 100 years). Paeroa recorded 346.5 mm (34.65 cm) of rain in 48 hours (which has a return period of 90 years)."

== Impact ==
Auckland recorded wind of 113km/h, and the Waikato experienced wind of 92.6km/h. Effects include power lines and trees being blown down. In Auckland, firemen were called out 120 times after rooves had been blown off. Part of the Mission Bay seawall collapsed. Takapuna had stormwater issues. At least 30 boats went missing from the Waitematā Harbour. Te Puru, Tararu, Kaueranga, Kirikiri, Matatoki, Hikutaia, Komata, Waitoki, Mangaiti, Waiorongomai, Tairua, and Ohinemuri rivers went into high flood. Main road between Auckland and the Bay of Plenty flooded.

In the Waikato, a recreational boat sunk. There was a landslide which closed Kopu-Hikuai Road. Slips and washouts also caused the closure of the highway between Paeroa and Waihi. Road sealing was ripped up in many parts of the Karangahake Gorge highway, and had debris scattered over it.

In 24 hours the Coromandel Ranges received at least 500mm of rain. The Ohinemuri River went 10 metres or more above normal level. The Kauaeranga River catchment measured 870mm of rain in 72 hours which has a return period of over 150 years. Extensive flooding of Opoutere farmland.

Roofs were blown off on 6 houses in Hahei, and another house was partially destroyed. A house was completely destroyed in Otama due to high winds. There was also flooding in Hikutaia which caused people to evacuate from their homes. In Paeroa all businesses and schools were closed, and the main street alongside a few side streets were covered by a few centimetres of water. A lot of silt was left on pastures.
