= Lincoln County Incident =

- Directed by: Tony Brittenden
- Written by: Tony Brittenden
- Produced by: Tony Brittenden
- Starring: Shane Simms
- Cinematography: Bob Brittenden
- Edited by: Tony Brittenden
- Music by: Dorothy Buchanan
- Release date: 1980
- Running time: 48 min
- Country: New Zealand
- Language: English
- Budget: $14,000

Lincoln County Incident is a 1980 New Zealand film. It was made by staff and students at Christchurch's Lincoln High School led by the schools head of art, Tony Brittenden. It debuted at Cannes Film Festival (television section) in 1980 before getting a local screening at the Academy Cinema and finishing the year at the New Zealand Film Festival.

Filming took place in 1974 in the school gym and on location at Castle Hill, followed by years of post production. Much of the work was done by the schools students, staff and parents, such as home economics teacher Rosemary Barnett who made the costumes. Brittenden's brother Rob was brought in for camera and studio sound work and musician Dorothy Buchanan composed and produced the soundtrack.

Helen Martin in New Zealand film, 1912-1996 wrote "Issued with a warning that some people may be disturbed by the film's use of inoffensive language, Lincoln County Incident is a pastiche of allusions and clichés parodying Western conventions. The narrative begins as drama and ends as farce. Played as a dumb show and with all sound done post-sync, the film is enlivened by over 1000 sound effects. Synched dialogue is avoided by use of a voice-over narrator. Witty and ingenious, the film makes good use of mon-tage, the stunts and performances are impressive and the production design, helped by the authenticity of the Castle Hill Station locations, is excellent."
