= William Perrett Mead =

New Zealand engineer, skier, tramper, ranger and writer

William Perrett Mead (7 December 1889 – 5 August 1980) was a New Zealand engineer, skier, tramper, ranger and writer. He was born in Scarrotts Station, Northland, New Zealand on 7 December 1889.
