= Top Town =

- Genre: Game show
- Presented by: Mark Leishman
- Country of origin: New Zealand
- Original language: English

Production
- Running time: 60 minutes (including commercials)

Original release
- Network: TVNZ
- Release: 1976 – 1990

Top Town is a New Zealand game show series where teams from different towns in New Zealand competed in various obstacle challenges against each other, along the lines of the earlier British series It's a Knockout. The show first ran in New Zealand between 1976 and 1990 and made a return in a slightly different form in 2009. The new format has similarities to Wipeout.

Top Town first screened on New Zealand television in 1976, the original Top Town competition took place at a different town each week with all competitions taking place on a local sports field. The show made a return in 2009 but due to health and safety regulations the new competition had to take on water with all teams now competing at Jellie Park in Christchurch.

== 2009 teams ==
In each of the first five weeks, three teams competed, with the five winning teams and a wild card team going onto the semi-finals. The winning teams from the two semi finals then competed for the title of Top Town in the grand final with the winning town taking home the Top Town trophy.

Week 1

- Masterton
- Ashburton (winner)
- Papakura

Week 2

- Queenstown
- Greymouth
- Whakatāne (winner)

Week 3

- Motueka
- Oamaru
- Taupō (winner)

Week 4

- Gisborne
- Timaru
- Whangārei (winner)

Week 5

- Christchurch
- Ōtorohanga
- Gore (winner)

Semi final 1

- Ashburton
- Motueka (wild card team)
- Taupō (winner)

Semi final 2

- Whakatāne (winner)
- Whangārei
- Gore

Grand final

- Taupō (winner)
- Whakatāne
