= Genevieve Westcott =

Canadian-born New Zealand journalist and television presenter (1954–2020)

- Born: Genevieve Patricia Westcott; 1954; Stratford, Ontario, Canada
- Died: 10 July 2020 (aged 65); Hawke's Bay, New Zealand
- Occupation: Journalist

Genevieve Patricia Westcott (1954 – 10 July 2020) was a Canadian-born New Zealand journalist and television presenter.

== Biography ==
Westcott was born in 1954 in Stratford, Ontario, the fourth of nine children of Virginia (née McNamara) and political aide Clare Westcott. She began her career as a financial reporter for the Vancouver Sun newspaper, followed by a position as an editorial page writer at Vancouver's The Province newspaper. She then moved into television, working for Canwest Television Network, the Canadian Broadcasting Corporation, and as the West Coast bureau chief and correspondent for CTV National News.

Westcott moved to New Zealand in 1984 and began working on TVNZ's Eyewitness News programme. In 1987, she was sought for a role for CTV's W5, Canada's top newsmagazine programme. She was an anchor and correspondent for the programme for two years (1987–88), and reported from North and South America, Central America, Europe, the Mediterranean, South East Asia, Australia and the South Pacific.

Following this role, she returned to New Zealand and joined 3 News when the television channel TV3 was launched in 1989. She also worked for TV3's 60 Minutes, 20/20 and A Current Affair programmes and at Newstalk ZB radio station. In 1996, she played the role of a reporter in Sir Peter Jackson's film The Frighteners.

In 2012, she moved into communications, working for Massey University in external communications. In 2014, she returned to television as a guest host on The Paul Henry Show.

Over the duration of her career, Westcott won 13 national and international journalism awards. These included two Canadian awards for legal reporting, three awards for investigative reporting at the New York Film and Television Festival, and eight New Zealand media awards. The first New Zealand award she won was in her first year after arriving in the country – the National Award for Television News Reporting at the Sir David Beattie New Zealand Journalism Awards in 1985.

=== Personal life ===
Westcott met New Zealand cameraman Ross "Rosco" Kenward in Canada and moved to New Zealand with him. They worked together at TV3. Kenward died in 2014.

Westcott died on 10 July 2020 in Hawke's Bay of breast cancer, aged 65. She is survived by her son, Jamie Kenward, and a grandson, as well as her father and seven siblings.
