= Hang on a Minute Mate (film) =

Hang On a Minute Mate
- Directed by: Alan Lindsay
- Written by: Alan Lindsay
- Produced by: Alan Lindsay
- Starring: Alan Jervis; Kelly Johnson
- Cinematography: Peter Read
- Edited by: Jamie Selkirk
- Music by: Bernie Allen; Tony Baker
- Release date: November 22, 1982
- Running time: 71 min
- Country: New Zealand
- Language: English

Hang On a Minute Mate is a 1982 New Zealand television film. It is based on stories featuring the character Sam Cash by Barry Crump from his books Hang on a Minute Mate (1961), One of Us (1962) and There and Back (1963). It was adapted, produced and directed by Alan Lindsay. Lindsay's first adapted the stories with a 30 minute film titled Sam Cash made in 1975. Hang On a Minute Mate was nominated in the Drama category at the 1982 Feltex Television Awards.

== Cast ==
- Alan Jervis as Sam Cash
- Kelly Johnson as Jack Lilburn
- Alex Trousdale as Tom Bine
- Arthur Chapman as T. Burke
- Patric Carey as Larry
- Larry Ford as Ponto
- Gwyneth Hughes as Sahra
- Sara Jones as Mrs. Cash

== Reception ==
Helen Martin in New Zealand film, 1912-1996 says "The camera moves little, zooms where it should cut, and is reluctant to provide information via the close up. The tinkly piano score adds a little energy, but not much. Also weakening the film are amateurish acting, a wordy script, out of synch dubbing and a deathly pace"
