= Country Calendar =

New Zealand documentary TV series

- Narrated by: Frank Torley (until 2015); Dan Henry (2016–present)
- Opening theme: "Hillbilly Child" by the Alan Moorhouse Band
- Country of origin: New Zealand
- No. of episodes: 1,500+

Production
- Producers: Dan Henry; Katherine Edmond
- Camera setup: Widescreen
- Running time: Approximately 22 minutes (without commercials); 30 minutes (including commercials)

Original release
- Network: TVNZ 1 (1966–present)
- Release: 6 March 1966 – present

Country Calendar is a New Zealand documentary television programme about farming and rural life. First broadcast on 6 March 1966, it is New Zealand's longest-running television programme. Originally conceived as an agricultural news programme for farmers, it subsequently developed into a documentary series aimed at a general audience, typically profiling farming families and rural businesses around New Zealand.

The Country Calendar theme song is from the song "Hillbilly Child" by the Alan Moorhouse Band. Hyundai has been the programme's naming rights sponsor.

== History ==
Country Calendar was first broadcast by the New Zealand Broadcasting Corporation (NZBC) on 6 March 1966. Initially a 15-minute programme airing on Sunday evenings, it was created primarily for a farming audience, although it was also expected to attract urban viewers. The programme was presented by Fred Barnes, a former Waikato farmer and rural broadcaster.

Budget and technical constraints limited the amount of location filming in the programme's early years. Most episodes consisted of agricultural market reports and studio interviews, with filmed reports from the field generally lasting no more than about five minutes. The first episode included a report on apricot production in Central Otago and an interview with Sir John Ormond, chairman of the New Zealand Meat Producers’ Board, about meat marketing.

When Tony Trotter became producer of the show in 1974, he decided to market the show towards a more general audience. Trotter also chose the Country Calendar theme music, Hillbilly Child by British musician Alan Moorhouse, which is still used by the show today.

Frank Torley began contributing to the show as a reporter in its first few years, and 10 years later moved to the show full-time, becoming producer in 1980. He was well known as the "gravelly Mr Country Calendar voice", and became the show's full-time narrator from the start of 2014. Torley retired from the show in October 2015, after developing vocal nodules. He died in March 2016 after a short battle with cancer.

In the 1990s Country Calendar moved to Saturday nights, after 23 years being broadcast on Sunday. The 1990s was also the first time a sponsor was added to the show's title.

Country Calendar has received NZ on Air funding since 1991, and is the longest running programme the agency has funded.

In 2005 a special 40 Years of Country Calendar episode was broadcast, comprising some of the show's highlights and detailing the show's history.

In 2011 Hyundai New Zealand became the show's naming rights sponsor, taking over from The National Bank. 2011 also marked the first year the show was broadcast in high definition.

Similar to during the show's 40th anniversary in 2005, in 2016 a special episode titled Country Calendar: 50 Golden Years was broadcast to celebrate Country Calendar being on air for 50 years. The special was hosted by broadcaster Jim Hickey, who had previously hosted the show for 5 years from 1998. Fair Go Presenter Anna Thomas also hosted the programme for one year in 1997.

A Country Calendar exhibition opened at Waikato Museum on 11 June 2016, to celebrate 50 years of the show.

In 2017, "Country Calendar" was returned to Sundays at 7.00pm.

== Production ==
Country Calendar is one of the longest-running television series in New Zealand (by number of years on air), after Coronation Street. There have been at least 1000 episodes broadcast, although in 2016 the show's producer suggests between 1200 and 1250 is more likely.

Country Calendar is currently produced by Dan Henry who took over from Julian O’Brien in 2023. Julian O'Brien first became involved in the show in 1985 before taking a break and then returning as producer in 2005. The show's associate producer is Katherine Edmond. Dan Henry is also the narrator, taking over from former narrator Frank Torley after his retirement in October 2015. O’Brien, Henry and Edmond also direct the show, along with directors Kerryanne Evans, Richard Langston, Celia Jaspers, Roz Mason, Howard Taylor, Robyn Janes, Vicki Wilkinson-Baker and Kirsty Babington. Cinematographers working on the show are Peter Young, Steve Fisher and Mike Potton. Regular sound operators are Don Paulin and Nigel Gordon-Crosby.

From 2013 the show has had 30 episodes per season, although this was increased to 40 episodes in 2016. According to Country Calendar's production blog, the show will have crew on the road for close to 250 days, in order to produce the 40 episodes. Country Calendar usually focuses on one story per episode.

In 2016 Country Calendar received $566,720 of NZ on Air funding, from the Documentary and Factual programme fund. This was increased from $425,036 in 2015, the same amount as in 2014 and 2013, due to the 10 extra episodes as of 2016. NZ On Air say that Country Calendar is "consistently the highest-rating NZ On Air funded programme, with more than half a million people tuning in every week". 583,500 people aged 5 or over watched the 2015 series on average.

Country Calendar is known to sometimes feature spoofs, where the series will occasionally break format and air an unannounced satirical episode. In 1974, a spoof episode aired focusing on the fictional character Fred Dagg (portrayed by satirist John Clarke). A spoof was first aired in 1977 with a farmer playing a fence as a musical instrument, and since then have included sheep dogs controlled by radio and a high fashion range of rural clothing, among others. While the spoofs were generally well-received, the radio-controlled dog episode resulted in numerous calls of it being inhumane. A Country Calendar – Spoofs Special highlighting the spoof episodes of the show was broadcast in 1999. The last part of the 2016 program marking the show's 50th anniversary was a spoof featuring an app designed to let farmers talk to their working dogs.

There are 10 Country Calendar DVDs on sale, including ‘Best of’ DVDs for each season from 2014 to 2017, as well as DVDs comprising episodes on different topics. These include Country Calendar Goes Fishing, Country Calendar on Horseback and Country Calendar Goes Green. The 50th anniversary special is also available on DVD. The NZ On Screen website also features some archived special episodes of the show which can be viewed online.

== Awards ==
Country Calendar has won numerous awards during its time on air.

Year	Awards Name	Category	Nominee	Result
1975	Feltex Television Awards	First Series Award	Country Calendar	Won
1977	Feltex Television Awards	Best Specialty Programme	Country Calendar	Won
1980	Feltex Television Awards	Best Information Programme	Country Calendar	Won
1981	Feltex Television Awards	Best Information Programme	Country Calendar	Won
1982	Feltex Television Awards	Best Information Programme	Country Calendar	Won
1983	Feltex Television Awards	Best Information Programme	Country Calendar	Won
1993	New Zealand Film and Television Awards	Best Factual Series	Country Calendar	Won
2000	TV Guide Television Awards	Best Camera	Peter Young (for episode Yankee Harvest)	Won
2002	TV Guide Television Awards	Best Factual Series	Country Calendar	Won
2002	TV Guide Television Awards	Best Camera, Non-Drama	Peter Young	Won
2005	New Zealand Screen Awards	Best Director (Factual Programming/Entertainment)	Jerome Cvitanovich (for episode Oamuru Stone)	Nominated
2005	Qantas Television Awards	Best Camera, Factual	Peter Young	Won
2006	TV Guide Best on the Box Awards*	Best Lifestyle Show	Country Calendar	Won
2007	Air New Zealand Screen Awards	Achievement in Camerawork, Documentary	Peter Young (for episode Cray Coast)	Won
2007	Qantas Television Awards	Best Camera, Factual	Country Calendar (for episode Autumn Muster)	Nominated
2007	TV Guide Best on the Box Awards*	Best Lifestyle Show	Country Calendar	Won
2015	TV Guide Best on the Box Awards*	Best Lifestyle/Advice Show	Country Calendar	Won
2018	Huawei Mate20 NZ Television Awards	Best Camerawork - Documentary/Factual	Peter Young	Nominated
2020	NZ Television Awards	Best Factual Series	Country Calendar	Won
2025	NZ Screen Awards	Best Factual Series	Country Calendar	Nominated
2025	NZ Cinematographers Society	Best Camera - Lifestyle & Reality	Peter Young	Won
2026	2026 New Zealand Screen Awards	Best Camerawork - Documentary/Factual Series	Peter Young	Won
2026	2026 New Zealand Screen Awards	Screen Legend Award	Marks 60th anniversary of the programme.	Won

== See also ==
- Agriculture in New Zealand
