= Sweetwaters Music Festival =

Music festival in New Zealand

Sweetwaters Music Festival was a series of events held between 1980 and 1999, at venues such as a farm in Ngāruawāhia, then further north on a farm near Pukekawa, and finally at South Auckland, New Zealand.

Sweetwaters music 1980

== Events ==
1980

- 1980 - Ngāruawāhia
- 1981 - Ngāruawāhia
- 1982 - Pukekawa
- 1983 - Pukekawa
- 1984 - Pukekawa
- 1999 - South Auckland

A related event, Sweetwaters South, was held in Christchurch in 1984

== Music ==
Elvis Costello, Bryan Ferry, Roxy Music, Ultravox, Dragon, Mi-Sex, Split Enz, Jo Jo Zep, Cold Chisel, The Tigers, Midge Marsden, Th' Dudes, The Crocodiles, UB40, The Wiggles.

1999 - The festival in 1999 was the largest festival event ever held in New Zealand, with a number of stages representing many genres/cultures of music, theatre, dance, comedy, and children's entertainment.

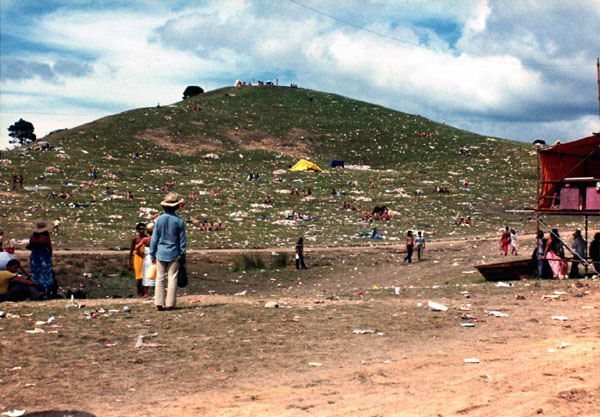
Sweetwaters Music auditorium

== Film and television ==
Radio With Pictures: Sweetwaters Festival, Television New Zealand, 1980 Reporter: Dylan Taite

== Books ==
- Keighley, Daniel. Sweetwaters: The Untold Story. Reviewed by Simon Sweetman: "Daniel Keighley was the man behind the financial disaster that was Sweetwaters ’99. He was charged with fraud and jailed and Sweetwaters: The Untold Story is his account of what went wrong. Billed as an autobiography."

== See also ==
- New Zealand music festivals
