= Ronald Davison =

New Zealand lawyer (1920–2015)

The Right Honourable Sir Ronald Davison GBE CMG QC

10th Chief Justice of New Zealand
- In office 3 February 1978 – 4 February 1989
- Nominated by: Robert Muldoon
- Appointed by: Sir Keith Holyoake
- Preceded by: Richard Wild
- Succeeded by: Thomas Eichelbaum

Personal details
- Born: 16 November 1920 Kaponga, Taranaki
- Died: 2 July 2015 (aged 94) Auckland, New Zealand
- Spouse: Jacqueline May Carr (m. 1948)

Sir Ronald Keith Davison GBE CMG QC (16 November 1920 – 2 July 2015) was a New Zealand lawyer and jurist. He served as the tenth Chief Justice of New Zealand from 1978 to 1989.

== Early life and family ==
Born in Kaponga on 16 November 1920, Davison was the son of Joseph James Davison and Florence Minnie Davison (née McCleland). He was educated at Te Kuiti District High School. During World War II, he served with the New Zealand Army (1941–1942) and Royal New Zealand Air Force (1942–1945), before completing a Bachelor of Laws degree at Auckland University College in 1947.

In 1948, Davison married Jacqueline May Carr, and the couple had three children, including Paul Davison KC, a barrister who prosecuted, among other cases, the trial of Scott Watson for the disappearance of Ben Smart and Olivia Hope in the Marlborough Sounds on 1 January 1998, and later became a High Court Judge (now retired).

== Career ==
Davison presided over the case of the sinking of the Rainbow Warrior. His sentence of 10 years jail for the French secret service agents was highly applauded, and he made a memorable statement:

People who come to this country and commit terrorist activities cannot expect to have a short holiday at the expense of our Government and return home as heroes.

When The New Zealand Herald celebrated its 150th birthday in November 2013, they named a "New Zealander of the Year" for each year of their history. Davison was their New Zealander of the Year for 1985 for his conduct during the trial of the French secret service agents.

Davison headed the government inquiry (1994–1997) into certain matters related to overseas company taxation, popularly known as the Winebox Inquiry. This involved allegations against a number of parties including the merchant bank Fay Richwhite. He also presided over the 1994 inquiry into the Family court proceedings involving the Bristol family, which resulted in a number of changes being made to New Zealand's child protection legislation.

Davison was appointed Queen's Counsel on 16 June 1963. In the 1975 Queen's Birthday Honours, Davison was appointed a Companion of the Order of St Michael and St George, for public services. He was appointed a Knight Grand Cross of the Order of the British Empire on 11 February 1978, just after his appointment as Chief Justice. Also in 1978, he was appointed to the Privy Council. He was awarded the Queen Elizabeth II Silver Jubilee Medal in 1977, and the New Zealand 1990 Commemoration Medal in 1990.

== Death ==
Davison died on 2 July 2015. Jacqueline, Lady Davison, died in Auckland on 16 November 2016.

== See also ==
- List of King's and Queen's Counsel in New Zealand

Legal offices
Preceded by Richard Wild	Chief Justice of New Zealand; 1978–1989	Succeeded by Thomas Eichelbaum
