= Ross Jansen =

New Zealand local-body politician

Sir Ross Jansen KBE JP
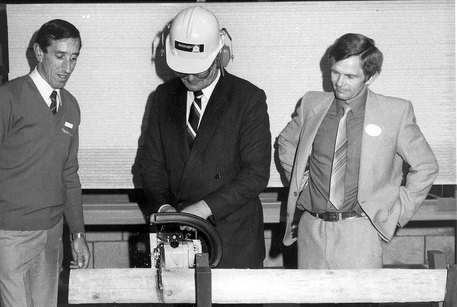
- Jansen opens the Bryce Street PlaceMakers, Hamilton, in 1982

28th Mayor of Hamilton
- In office October 1977 – November 1989
- Preceded by: Bruce Beetham
- Succeeded by: Margaret Evans

Personal details
- Born: Ross Malcolm Jansen; 6 September 1932 Carterton, New Zealand
- Died: 15 December 2010 (aged 78) Orewa, New Zealand
- Spouse: Rhyl Robinson
- Children: 6
- Profession: Lawyer

Sir Ross Malcolm Jansen KBE JP (6 September 1932 – 15 December 2010) was a New Zealand local-body politician. He served as mayor of Hamilton from 1977 to 1989. He was an expert in local government, held a variety of positions, was academically acknowledged, and received a number of honours.

== Biography ==
Jansen was born on 6 September 1932 in Carterton, the son of Frank Egbert Jansen and Pearl Elizabeth Jansen, and was educated at Featherston District High School, Marton District High School, and Horowhenua College. He then studied at Victoria University College, from where he graduated with a LLB in 1957. He became a barrister and solicitor. In 1957, Jansen married Beatrice Rhyl Robinson, and the couple went on to have six children.

Jansen was a Hamilton City Councillor from 1965 to 1974 and deputy mayor from 1971 to 1974. In the 1972 election, he stood in the new Hamilton East electorate for the National Party, but was defeated by Labour's Rufus Rogers.

At a 1976 by-election he stood for Mayor of Hamilton but was unsuccessful, losing to Social Credit leader Bruce Beetham. At the next election he stood again (Beetham did not stand for another term) and was elected mayor of Hamilton in 1977, holding office until he was defeated in 1989.

Jansen served as deputy chairman of the Waikato United Council from 1980 to 1986 and chairman from 1986 to 1989. In 1984 he was awarded an honorary doctorate by the University of Waikato. He subsequently completed a DPhil in 1993 at the same institution about New Zealand local government reform in the 1980s.

Jansen was president of the Municipal Association of New Zealand from 1984 to 1987, and was the first president of the New Zealand Local Government Association. He was appointed a Commander of the Order of the British Empire, for services to the city of Hamilton and local government, in the 1986 New Year Honours, and promoted to Knight Commander of the same order in the 1989 Queen's Birthday Honours. In 1990 he was awarded life membership of the New Zealand Local Government Association, and received the New Zealand 1990 Commemoration Medal. From 1990 to 1993 he was chairperson of the Waikato Regional Council. He was appointed chairman of the Local Government Commission from 1998 to 2001.

Jansen died at his home in Orewa, north of Auckland, on 15 December 2010.

Political offices
Preceded by Bruce Beetham	Mayor of Hamilton; 1977–1989	Succeeded by Margaret Evans
