= Hei Konei Rā =

1984 single by Pātea Māori Club

Single by Pātea Māori Club featuring Dalvanius and the Yandall Sisters

from the album Poi E
- Released: December 1984
- Recorded: 1984
- Studio: Mascot Recording Studios, Auckland.
- Genre: Māori music; Pop
- Length: 3:05
- Label: Maui Records
- Songwriters: Dalvanius Prime; Ngoi Pēwhairangi
- Producer: Dalvanius Prime

Pātea Māori Club featuring Dalvanius and the Yandall Sisters singles chronology
| "Aku Raukura" (1984) | "Hei Konei Rā" (1984) | "E Papa" (1985) |

The Yandall Sisters singles chronology
| "Light a Candle" (1983) | "Hei Konei Rā" (1984) | "Gonna Have to Change" (1988) |

"Hei Konei Rā", also known as "Hei Konei Ra (Farewell)" on its original release, is a song by Pātea Māori Club. Originally written in sessions with Ngoi Pēwhairangi and Dalvanius Prime in Tokomaru Bay in 1982, it was released as their third single in late 1984, prior to the band's tour of the United Kingdom. The song peaked at number 21 in New Zealand, and was later included in their 1987 debut album Poi E.

== Background and composition ==
The song was written in Tokomaru Bay in 1982, when Dalvanius Prime visited the house of lyricist Ngoi Pēwhairangi. In a single day, the pair had created "Poi E", "Aku Raukura" and "Hei Konei Rā". The lyrics are written as a lament for the loss of the old ways.

The song was recorded as a ballad backed by string and synthesiser arrangement, featuring Dalvanius on lead vocals and the Samoan New Zealander vocal trio The Yandall Sisters on backing vocals. "Hei Konei Rā" was first found on a Pātea Māori Club release as a B-side on the "Aku Raukura" single released earlier in the year, where it appeared as a part of a live medley.

The song was released as a single in December 1984. In mid-January, the song debuted at number 21 on the Official New Zealand Music Chart, spending four weeks in the top 30 singles, and a total of eight weeks charting in the top 50 singles. However, by late July the single peaked at number 10. This was released just prior to the club's global tour, which they left for on 15 January 1985.

As the song primarily features vocals from Dalvanius, it made an appearance on the 2003 retrospective album A Man of Passion, released after Dalvanius died in October 2002. It was also featured on the compilation album Waiata 2: Maori Showbands, Balladeers & Pop Stars in 2013.

== Track listing ==
- NZ 7-inch single
1. "Hei Konei Ra (Farewell)" – 3:05
2. "He Honore Karoria (The Honour & Glory)" – 2:25

== Credits and personnel ==
Credits adapted from the Poi E album booklet.

- Dave Hurley – engineering, co-production
- Gordon Joll – drums
- Stuart Pearce – keyboard, additional arrangement
- Ngoi Pēwhairangi – songwriting
- Dalvanius Prime – arrangement, lead vocals, producer, songwriting
- Addelle Yandall – additional vocals
- Mary Yandall – additional vocals
- Pauline Yandall – additional vocals

== Charts ==
| Chart (1984) | Peak position |
|---|---|
| New Zealand (Recorded Music NZ) | 21 |
