= Pātea Māori Club =

New Zealand Māori performance club

- Origin: Pātea, South Taranaki, New Zealand
- Genres: Māori music, pop, hip hop
- Years active: 1967–present
- Labels: Maui Records, Warner Music, Jayrem Records
- Members: Sydney Kershaw; Patricia Ngarewa; Pauline Prime
- Past members: Maggie Tiahuia "Hui" Kahu; Sid Kahu; Terina Kahu; Joe Moana; Sean Nuku; Dalvanius Prime; Nephi Prime; Sam Prime; Sid Prime; Timothy Prime; Liz Matiaha; John Nyman
- Website: The Pātea Māori Club on Facebook

Pātea Māori Club is a New Zealand cultural group and performance act formed in the South Taranaki town of Pātea in 1967 as the Pātea Methodist Māori Club. In 1983, the group began to release Māori-language pop and hip hop music, produced by Dalvanius Prime with lyrics by Ngoi Pēwhairangi. Their first single, "Poi E", reached number one on the New Zealand top 50 singles chart in 1984.

The group released further singles, such as "Aku Raukura", "Hei Konei Rā (Farewell)", and "E Papa", and toured the United Kingdom in 1984 and 1985. Prime had plans for a musical adaptation of "Poi E" and a separate children's animated film, however the death of Pēwhairangi in 1985 slowed progress for these projects. Eventually the group's album Poi E was released in 1987, and the musical was performed in 1994. Prime died in 2002.

The song's popularity was revitalised in 2010 after it was featured in the Taika Waititi film Boy, and again in 2016, when director Tearepa Kahi created Poi E: The Story of Our Song, a documentary film about the song's history, creation, and enduring popularity.

== History ==
=== 1967–1982: Early years ===
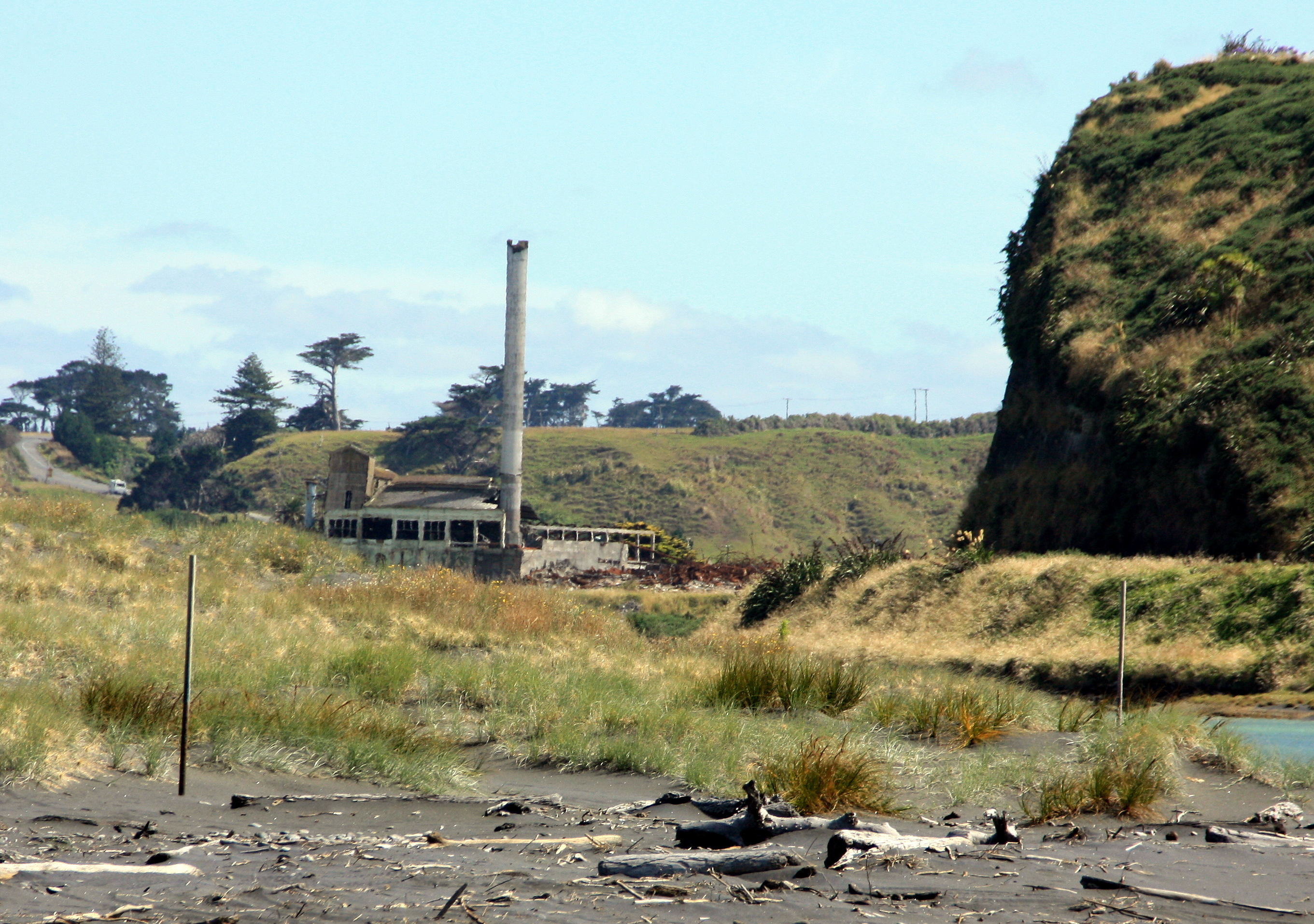
The derelict Patea Freezing Works, which closed in 1982.

Pātea Māori Club was founded in 1967, when Pātea was a thriving town, largely due to its freezing works. The group was formed by members of Pariroa Pā (north of Pātea), however, after the involvement of the reverend Napi Waaka, the group became known as the Pātea Methodist Māori Club. The club held kapa haka performing tours across the country, and toured Papua New Guinea due to the reverend's Methodist-church connections. One of the largest regular events that the club would compete in was the Polynesian Festival; they competed in its inaugural year, 1972. The group released two LP records of waiata, Toia (as the Patea Methodist Club), in 1973, and Music of the Maori (as the South Taranaki Methodist Maori Cultural Group), in 1976. The group voted to remove the word Methodist from their name, due to the large number of non-Methodist members, and by the early 1980s were known as the South Taranaki Māori Club.

In 1982, the Patea Freezing Works closed down, leading to severe economic problems for the town.

=== 1982–1988: "Poi E" and success ===
Record producer Dalvanius Prime grew up in Pātea, however was primarily interested in rock and soul music. In the 1960s he moved to Wellington to perform as a member of the Shevelles, and in the 1970s moved to Australia, forming a band called the Fascinations with his brother Eddie and sister Barletta. In the mid-1970s, the band was a doo-wop act working as a touring and backing band for the Australian rock band Sherbet on their 1975 Life Is for Living tour. The group released a single called "Canberra, We're Watching You", a cover of The Staple Singers' song "Washington We're Watching You", however with lyrics adapted to talk about the 1975 Australian constitutional crisis. He returned to New Zealand in 1979 to see his mother as she died, and was confronted about his lack of knowledge of te reo Māori, when he was unable to understand the final words she spoke in the last days of her life. In 1980, Dalvanius toured with his sister Barletta, performing at marae across the country, and in 1982 took an intensive Māori language course at the Wellington Polytechnic. Dalvanius continued to work as a music producer in New Zealand, seeing success in 1982 when two Māori language songs he produced were some of the top selling releases of the year: "Maoris on 45" by the Consorts, which reached number four in New Zealand, and "E Ipo" by Prince Tui Teka, which reached number one.

In 1982, Dalvanius toured New Zealand with Prince Tui Teka. When they were visiting the East Coast, Dalvanius visited Tokomaru Bay to meet Ngoi Pēwhairangi, the Māori language songwriter who Dalvanius had worked with to create "E Ipo", who he had not met before. There, Dalvanius learnt much Tikanga Māori from Pēwhairangi, and decided to stay longer to connect more strongly with his roots. After issuing a challenge to Dalvanius, asking him how he would make younger generations be proud of being Māori, he began to collaborate with her musically, and in a single day wrote "Poi E", "Aku Raukura" and "Hei Konei Rā". Dalvanius envisioned a 10-year plan for the project, involving the creation of a musical and an animated children's film, which the pair planned together during his stay.

In 1983, Dalvanius presented "Poi E" to the Pātea Māori Club, as a song they could use to compete in the 1983 Polynesian Festival, which won them first place equal for the poi category. Dalvanius wanted to release the song as a single, however record companies did not believe the song was commercial. Because of this, Dalvanius launched an independent record label named Maui Records, envisioning it as a Māori Motown, and recorded "Poi E" in 1983, using funds that local Pātea businesses had donated. Dalvanius created a funky rhythmic backing track, using bass, LinnDrums and a synthesiser, which Pēwhairangi did not like, believing that this might upset many members of the Māori community due to its modern sound. Pēwhairangi grew to respect the song's arrangement and how strongly it resonated with Māori youth.

"Poi E" was released as a single in late 1983, however most publicity was through word-of-mouth, and the track received little support through radio. Dalvanius and some members of the club travelled to Auckland for an informal grassroots promotional campaign, by going to clubs, ice skating rinks and Les Mills gyms; places which Dalvanius saw as trendsetting places. After a feature in the television programme Eyewitness, the song began climbing the charts, and eventually spent four weeks at number one in 1984. The track was so successful that by the end of the year it was the top selling release of the year, and the only song of New Zealand origin in the top 50 singles of 1984.

The song had a great impact on the town of Pātea, revitalising the pride people felt in being from the town. In June 1984, the group released their second single "Aku Raukura", a top 10 single which featured Dalvanius' brother Timothy Prime on lead vocals. Later in this year this was followed by "Hei Konei Ra (Farewell)", which reached number 21 on the charts. Eight dates of the group's 1984 club tour of New Zealand were cancelled, over bad publicity alleging the band had brought cannabis on their tour bus (when in fact eight cannabis seeds were found on the support band's tour bus). Dalvanius decided to mortgage his house in Hāwera in order to finance an international tour, as requests for government funding towards a royal performance in the United Kingdom were turned down, as Māori culture was not considered "New Zealand culture".

The group toured internationally in 1984 and 1985, performing at the London Palladium and the Edinburgh Festival, as well as appearances on British morning television programmes and Blue Peter. The group performed at the Midem music fair in Cannes, France, and in the United States as a part of the Te Maori exhibition, and a concert in New York where they were the supporting act for the Violent Femmes. Originally, the band planned to release their album in February 1985, however lyricist and mentor to Dalvanius, Ngoi Pēwhairangi, died in early 1985, halfway through the album's production period. Dalvanius was deeply affected by this loss, feeling creatively exhausted, unable to write songs without her and unable to record in the studio. The group returned to the United Kingdom for a Royal Command Performance for Queen Elizabeth II, Prince Philip and Princess Anne in July 1985.

At the end of the year, the club released the single "E Papa", a traditional song used in tītī tōrea stick games, followed by "Ka Huri" in 1986. In late 1987, the group's full-length studio album, Poi E, was finally released. A mix of traditional songs and compositions by Prime, the album was primarily recorded in Auckland between April and December 1987. The album featured collaborations with actor Don Selwyn (who served as the narrator), The Yandall Sisters, Annie Crummer, Moana Maniapoto (of Moana and the Moahunters) and Dave Dobbyn. "Ngoi Ngoi", a single written in memory of Ngoi Pēwhairangi, was released in early 1988. For the World Expo 88 held in Brisbane, the group recorded a rearranged bilingual version of "God Defend New Zealand" alongside Annie Crummer and Peter Morgan, which was later used by TVNZ as a transmission opening clip from 1991 to 1992. Members of Pātea Māori Club performed at the New Zealand pavilion of Seville Expo '92 New Zealand pavilion, including Sid Kahu, Maggie Tiahuia Kahu and Pauline Prime.

=== 1989–present: continued works ===
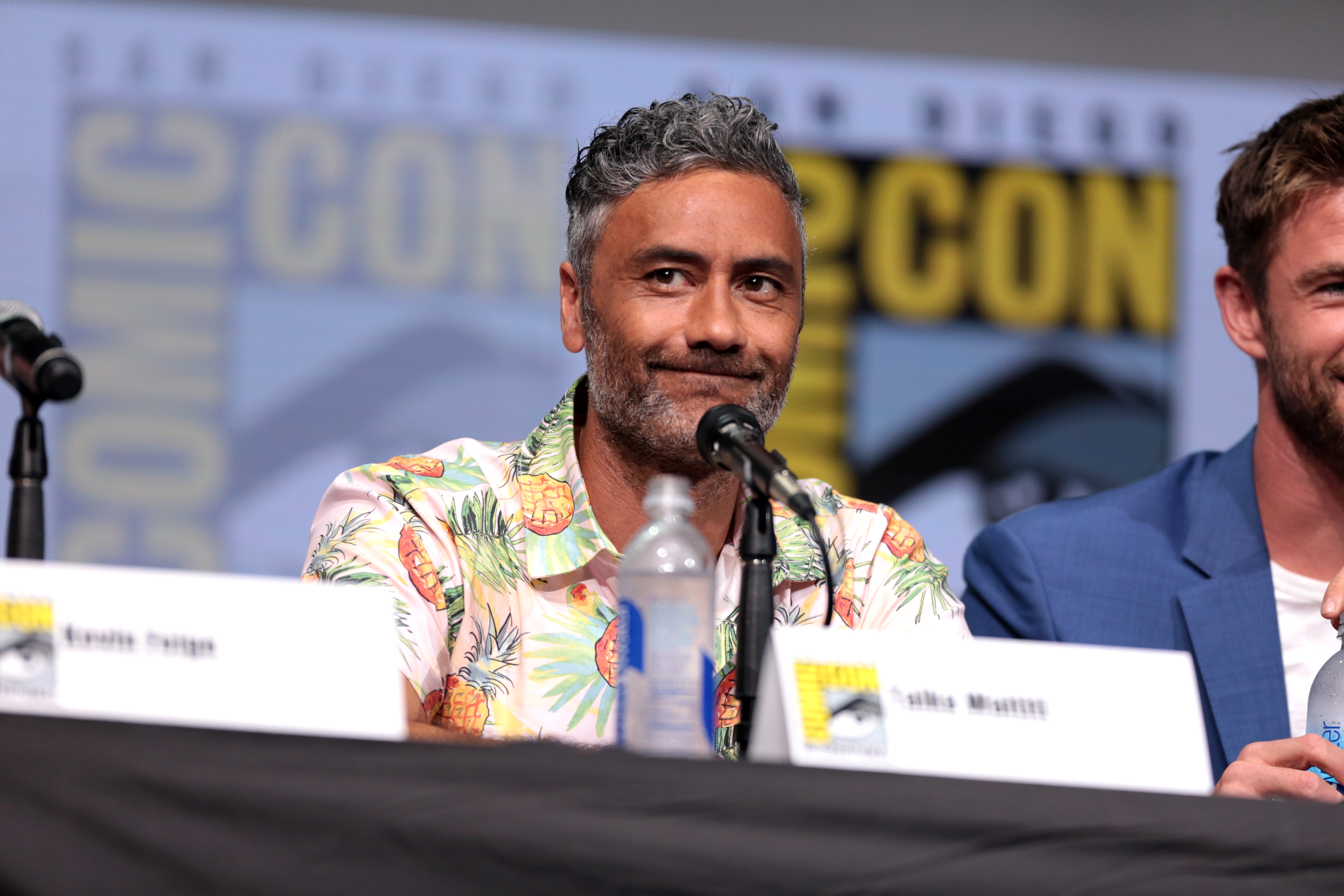
The song "Poi E" had a resurgence of popularity after being featured in the film Boy directed by Taika Waititi (pictured).

After 10 years of production, the Poi E musical had its debut performance in 1994. The musical featured songs by the act, and told the story of the Patea Freezing Works. In 1996, Poi E was re-issued on CD, featuring additional songs including "Kua Makona", the 1986 single produced by Dalvanius for Moana, and songs from the soundtrack to the 1987 film Ngati. In the late 1990s, Dalvanius worked on his vision of creating a fantasy animated children's film adaptation of "Poi E", entitled Poi E: the Myths and Legends. Beginning in 1997, Pātea Māori Club became an annual fixture of Paepae in the Park, an annual Waitangi Day festival held in Pātea.

Dalvanius Prime died in October 2002 at Hāwera Hospital, after suffering with cancer for over a year. A retrospective greatest hits album celebrating Dalvanius was released in 2003, A Man of Passion, including the Pātea Māori Club songs "Anei Ra", "Hei Konei Rā", and "I'll Be There for You"; the latter a song performed as a part of the Poi E musical.

"Poi E" returned to the NZ Singles Chart in 2009, after being featured in an advertising campaign for Vodafone, accompanied by the release of Poi E (25th Anniversary Edition) in August 2009, an extended version of the album featuring unreleased songs, remixes and live tracks. The song was prominently featured during the final dance sequence of the Taika Waititi film Boy (2010), which led to the song re-charting for a third time. In May, Waititi filmed a new music video for the song, alongside members of the Pātea Māori Club. The song peaked at number 3 on the charts in its third chart run, and became the 43rd most successful single in 2010 in New Zealand. The group finished the year by performing to their largest audience at Christmas in the Park 2010.

In 2016, Tearepa Kahi, director of the 2013 film Mt. Zion, released Poi E: The Story Behind Our Song, a documentary on the creation of "Poi E" through archival footage, interviews and dramatic reenactments. The documentary was a commercial success, becoming the third New Zealand documentary film to gross over $1,000,000 domestically.

As a part of the Māori Television show Marae DIY in 2017, the 1980s clubrooms used by the group were refurbished. In 2021, Pātea Māori Club was awarded a Taite Music Prize (the IMNZ Classic Record). As of 2021, Pātea Māori Club currently has around 80 performing members, who continue perform, and use the club as a space where Tikanga Māori can be maintained (using Ngāti Ruanui protocols). There are two associated competitive kapa haka groups involving members but separate from the club, Aotea Utanganui and Taranaki ki te Tonga Taikura.

== Discography ==
=== Studio albums ===
Title	Album details	Peak chart positions
Title	Album details	NZ Artist
Toia (as Patea Methodist Club)	Released: 1973; Label: Õde Recording Co; Format: Vinyl, cassette	—
Music of the Maori (as South Taranaki Methodist Maori Cultural Group)	Released: 1976; Label: Õde; Format: Vinyl	—
Poi E	Released: 1987; Label: Maui Records, WEA, Jayrem Records; Format: CD, vinyl, cassette	8 (Note: 25th Anniversary Edition, charting in 2016 after the release of Poi E: The Story of Our Song.)
"—" denotes a recording that did not chart.

=== Singles ===
==== As lead artist ====
Title	Year	Peak chart positions	Certifications	Album
Title	Year	NZ	Certifications	Album
"Poi E" (featuring Dalvanius)	1983	1	RMNZ: 3× Platinum	Poi E
"Aku Raukura" (featuring Dalvanius)	1984	10	RMNZ: Gold	Poi E
"Hei Konei Ra (Farewell)" (featuring Dalvanius and the Yandall Sisters)	1984	21		Poi E
"E Papa" (featuring Dalvanius)	1985	41		Poi E
"Ka Huri" (featuring Hui Kahu)	1986	—		Poi E
"Ngoi Ngoi"	1988	—		Poi E
"Paikea"	1992	—		Poi E
"—" denotes a recording that did not chart.

==== As featured artist ====
Title	Year	Peak chart positions	Album
Title	Year	NZ	Album
"Give Them Life" (among New Zealand Music Awards Finale performers and presenters)	1985	—	Non-album single
"The New Zealand Expo Song (God Defend New Zealand)" (Annie Crummer, Peter Morgan, Dalvanius and Pātea Maori with the New Zealand Youth Jazz Orchestra)	1988	47	In the Land of the Long White Cloud (Note: Album by Matt Catingub with the New Zealand Youth Jazz Orchestra.)
"—" denotes a recording that did not chart.

=== Guest appearances ===
Title	Year	Other artists	Album
"He Tohu Maoritanga"	1972	—N/a	Highlights from the First New Zealand Polynesian Festival Rotorua
"Te Ariki"	1972	—N/a	Highlights from the First New Zealand Polynesian Festival Rotorua
"Toia"	1973	—N/a	This Is New Zealand Ko: Aotearoa Tenei
"Ratana Te Mangai"	1973	—N/a	This Is New Zealand Ko: Aotearoa Tenei
"Patu Poi Rorotiti"	1973	—N/a	This Is New Zealand Ko: Aotearoa Tenei
"Te Manu Korimako"	1973	—N/a	This Is New Zealand Ko: Aotearoa Tenei
"Ka Titi Au Ka Titu Au"	1973	—N/a	This Is New Zealand Ko: Aotearoa Tenei
"Silent Night"	2010	—N/a	So This Is Christmas
"Poi E (Tokomaru Bay Version)"	2016	Dalvanius Prime, Ngoi Pewhairangi, Barletta Prime	Poi E: The Story of Our Song, Music from the Motion Picture
"Ngoi Ngoi (Patea Film Collective Remix)"	2016	Pātea Film Collective	Poi E: The Story of Our Song, Music from the Motion Picture

== Awards and nominations ==
=== New Zealand Music Awards ===
Year (Note: Indicates the year of ceremony. Each year is linked to the article about the awards held that year, wherever possible.)	Recipient(s) and nominee(s)	Category	Result	Ref.
1983	"Poi E"	Best Polynesian Album	Nominated	
1984	"Aku Raukura"	Single of the Year	Nominated	
1984	"Aku Raukura"	Best Polynesian Album	Won	
1984	Pātea Māori Club	Top Group	Nominated	
1984	Joe Wylie – single cover for "Aku Raukura"	Best Cover Design	Won	
1985	Dalvanius Prime & the Pātea Māori Club	International Achievement	Nominated	
1986	"E Papa"	Single of the Year	Nominated	
1986	Pātea Māori Club	Best Group	Nominated	
1988	Poi E	Best Polynesian Album	Won	
1988	"Ngoi Ngoi"	Best Polynesian Album	Nominated	

=== Taite Music Prize ===
Year	Recipient(s) and nominee(s)	Category	Result	Ref.
2021	"Poi E"	Independent Music NZ Classic Record	Won	
