= New Zealand top 50 singles of 1984 =

New Zealand music chart

This is a list of the top 50 singles in New Zealand of 1984 as compiled by Recorded Music NZ in the end-of-year chart of the Official New Zealand Music Chart. Only one single by a New Zealand artist is included on the chart, however it was the highest selling single of the year, Pātea Māori Club's debut single "Poi E".

== Chart ==
Key
† – Single of New Zealand origin

| Rank | Artist | Title |
|---|---|---|
| 1 | Pātea Māori Club | "Poi E" † |
| 2 | Stevie Wonder | "I Just Called to Say I Love You" |
| 3 | Bob Marley | "One Love/People Get Ready" |
| 4 | Bruce Springsteen | "Dancing in the Dark" |
| 5 | Ray Parker Jr. | "Ghostbusters" |
| 6 | Foster and Allen | "Maggie" |
| 7 | Cyndi Lauper | "Girls Just Want to Have Fun" |
| 8 | Special AKA | "Nelson Mandela" |
| 9 | Kenny Loggins | "Footloose" |
| 10 | George Michael | "Careless Whisper" |
| 11 | New Order | "Blue Monday" |
| 12 | Frankie Goes to Hollywood | "Two Tribes" |
| 13 | Tina Turner | "What's Love Got to Do with It" |
| 14 | U2 | "Pride (In the Name of Love)" |
| 15 | Prince | "When Doves Cry" |
| 16 | Frankie Goes to Hollywood | "Relax" |
| 17 | Billy Idol | "Rebel Yell" |
| 18 | Nena | "99 Luftballons" |
| 19 | Time Bandits | "I'm Only Shooting Love" |
| 20 | Bronski Beat | "Smalltown Boy" |
| 21 | Sade | "Your Love Is King" |
| 22 | ZZ Top | "Legs" |
| 23 | Wham! | "Wake Me Up Before You Go-Go" |
| 24 | Julio Iglesias and Willie Nelson | "To All the Girls I've Loved Before" |
| 25 | Queen | "I Want to Break Free" |
| 26 | Bette Midler | "Beast of Burden" |
| 27 | Berlin | "No More Words" |
| 28 | INXS | "Original Sin" |
| 29 | Thompson Twins | "Hold Me Now" |
| 30 | Tina Turner | "Let's Stay Together" |
| 31 | Jimmy Cliff | "Reggae Night" |
| 32 | Kenny Rogers and Dolly Parton | "Islands in the Stream" |
| 33 | Shakin' Stevens and Bonnie Tyler | "A Rockin' Good Way" |
| 34 | Pointer Sisters | "Automatic" |
| 35 | The Cars | "Drive" |
| 36 | Pseudo Echo | "A Beat for You" |
| 37 | Duran Duran | "The Reflex" |
| 38 | Michael Jackson | "Thriller" |
| 39 | Midnight Oil | "Power and the Passion" |
| 40 | Pointer Sisters | "Jump (For My Love)" |
| 41 | Phil Collins | "Against All Odds (Take a Look at Me Now)" |
| 42 | Matthew Wilder | "Break My Stride" |
| 43 | Deniece Williams | "Let's Hear It for the Boy" |
| 44 | Cyndi Lauper | "Time After Time" |
| 45 | The S.O.S. Band | "Just Be Good to Me" |
| 46 | Echo & the Bunnymen | "Killing Moon" |
| 47 | INXS | "I Send a Message" |
| 48 | Joy Division | "Love Will Tear Us Apart" |
| 49 | Billy Idol | "Eyes Without a Face" |
| 50 | Paul Young | "Come Back and Stay" |

== Chart by numbers ==
=== Origin ===
==== By artist ====
The following shows the country of origin from where the artist (including any featured artist where applicable) originate from. Artists who appear more than once have only been tallied once.

| Country | Total |
|---|---|
| United States | 19 |
| England | 13 |
| Australia | 5 |
| Ireland | 2 |
| Germany | 2 |
| Jamaica | 2 |
| New Zealand | 1 |
| Scotland | 1 |
| Wales | 1 |

Notes
- Time Bandits are from Germany and Netherlands respectively.

==== By single ====
The following shows the country of origin from which the singles originate regardless of who the artist is.

| Country | Total |
|---|---|
| United States | 22 |
| England | 17 |
| Australia | 6 |
| Jamaica | 2 |
| Ireland | 2 |
| Germany | 2 |
| New Zealand | 1 |
| Scotland | 1 |
| Wales | 2 |

=== Most singles ===
Shows the artists with the most singles to appear in this chart.

| Artist | Total |
|---|---|
| Frankie Goes to Hollywood | 2 |
| Tina Turner | 2 |
| Cyndi Lauper | 2 |
| Billy Idol | 2 |
| INXS | 2 |
| Pointer Sisters | 2 |

=== Format ===
The following shows where each single appears on, whether it was the artists album, a non-album single, an extended play or as part of a soundtrack.

| Format | Total |
|---|---|
| Albums | 41 |
| Soundtracks | 6 |
| non-album singles | 3 |

Notes
- The songs "Ghostbusters" by Ray Parker Jr., "Footloose" by Kenny Loggins, "Against All Odds (Take a Look at Me Now)" by Phil Collins, "Let's Hear It for the Boy" by Deniece Williams and "Thriller" by Michael Jackson are from soundtrack albums.
- The song "Poi E" by Pātea Māori Club is a non-album single initially, later included on the album Poi E.

=== Multiple releases ===
The following shows singles that had multiple releases from the same album.

| Title | Total | Singles |
|---|---|---|
| Welcome to the Pleasuredome (Frankie Goes to Hollywood) | 2 | Two Tribes; Relax |
| Private Dancer (Tina Turner) | 2 | What's Love Got to Do with It; Let's Stay Together |
| She's So Unusual (Cyndi Lauper) | 2 | Girls Just Want to Have Fun; Time After Time |
| Rebel Yell (Billy Idol) | 2 | Rebel Yell; Eyes Without a Face |
| The Swing (INXS) | 2 | Original Sin; I Send a Message |
| Break Out (Pointer Sisters) | 2 | Automatic; Jump (For My Love) |

=== Type ===
The following shows the denomination that each single was released as, whether as a solo artist or as part of a group, band or duo.

| Type | Total |
|---|---|
| Solo artists | 28 |
| Groups | 16 |
| Duos | 4 |
| Collaborations | 2 |

Notes
- Julio Iglesias and Willie Nelson; Kenny Rogers and Dolly Parton and Shakin' Stevens and Bonnie Tyler have been regarded as collaborations.

=== Top Genre ===
The following shows the most common genres the Top 50 singles are regarded as (as per their genre descriptions in the singles entries. Where a genre was not noted, the genre of the album was used instead. Subgenres have been split as their own entry.

| Genre | Total | Singles |
|---|---|---|
| Pop | 16 | I Just Called to Say I Love You (Stevie Wonder); Maggie (Foster and Allen); Girls Just Want to Have Fun (Cyndi Lauper); Careless Whisper (George Michael); Two Tribes (Frankie Goes to Hollywood); Pride (In the Name of Love) (U2); Wake Me Up Before You Go-Go (Wham!); To All the Girls I've Loved Before (Julio Iglesias and Willie Nelson); I Want to Break Free (Queen); Hold Me Now (Thompson Twins); Islands in the Stream (Kenny Rogers and Dolly Parton); Drive (The Cars); The Reflex (Duran Duran); Thriller (Michael Jackson); Against All Odds (Take a Look at Me Now) (Phil Collins); Time After Time (Cyndi Lauper) |
| Rock | 8 | Dancing in the Dark (Bruce Springsteen); Rebel Yell (Billy Idol); Legs (ZZ Top); No More Words (Berlin); Power and the Passion (Midnight Oil); Drive (The Cars); The Reflex (Duran Duran); Come Back and Stay (Paul Young) |
| Synthpop | 6 | Blue Monday (New Order); Two Tribes (Frankie Goes to Hollywood); Relax (Frankie Goes to Hollywood); Smalltown Boy (Bronski Beat); Hold Me Now (Thompson Twins); I Send a Message (INXS) |
| R&B | 5 | I Just Called to Say I Love You (Stevie Wonder); What's Love Got to Do with It (Tina Turner); When Doves Cry (Prince); Automatic (Pointer Sisters); Just Be Good to Me (The S.O.S. Band) |
| Reggae | 4 | One Love/People Get Ready (Bob Marley); Reggae Night (Jimmy Cliff); Islands in the Stream; Poi E (Pātea Māori Club)† |
| New wave | 4 | Blue Monday (New Order); Your Love Is King (Sade); Original Sin (INXS); The Killing Moon (Echo & the Bunnymen) |

=== Top Labels ===
The following shows the most common record labels that a single was associated with. Any label that only had one single has not been noted.

| Label | Total | Singles |
|---|---|---|
| Epic | 4 | One Love/People Get Ready (Bob Marley); Girls Just Want to Have Fun (Cyndi Lauper); Time After Time (Cyndi Lauper); Reggae Night (Jimmy Cliff) |
| Virgin | 3 | Smalltown Boy (Bronski Beat); Your Love Is King (Sade); Power and the Passion (Midnight Oil) |
| Motown | 2 | I Just Called to Say I Love You (Stevie Wonder); Beast of Burden (Bette Midler |
| Columbia Records | 2 | Dancing in the Dark (Bruce Springsteen); Careless Whisper (George Michael |
| Warner Bros. | 2 | Ghostbusters (Ray Parker Jr.); Legs (ZZ Top) |
| Chrysalis Records | 2 | Rebel Yell (Billy Idol); Eyes Without a Face (Billy Idol) |

=== Top songwriters ===
The following shows the songwriters who had the most top-selling singles of 1984 in New Zealand.

| Writer | Total | Singles |
|---|---|---|
| Trevor Horn | 2 | Two Tribes (Frankie Goes to Hollywood); Relax (Frankie Goes to Hollywood) |
| Cyndi Lauper | 2 | Girls Just Want to Have Fun (Cyndi Lauper) (co-write Robert Hazard); Time After Time (Cyndi Lauper) |

=== Most/Least songwriters ===
The following shows the singles that were credited as having been written by only one person and the singles that had the most credited writers of 1984.

| Single | Total | Songwriter/s |
|---|---|---|
| "Poi E" (Pātea Māori Club)† | 2 | Ngoi Pēwhairangi; Dalvanius Prime |
| "I Just Called to Say I Love You" (Stevie Wonder) | 1 | Stevie Wonder |
| "Careless Whisper" (George Michael) | 2 | George Michael; Andrew Ridgeley |
| "Ghostbusters" (Ray Parker Jr.) | 1 | Ray Parker Jr. |
| "When Doves Cry" (Prince) | 1 | Prince |

=== Top producers ===
The following shows the producers who had the most singles to appear on this chart.

| Producer | Total | Singles |
|---|---|---|
| Trevor Horn | 2 | Two Tribes (Frankie Goes to Hollywood); Relax (Frankie Goes to Hollywood) |
| Rick Chertoff | 2 | Girls Just Want to Have Fun (Cyndi Lauper); Time After Time (Cyndi Lauper) |
