= E Papa Waiari =

1984 single by Pātea Māori Club

"E Papa Waiari" (English: "Oh, Uncle Waiari"), also known as "E Papa Wairangi" is a traditional Māori song, often used in tītī tōrea, a type of whakaraka (skill and dexterity game) played by passing tītī (40-60cm long sticks) while seated, in time to a rhythmic song.

The song became a staple for Māori musicians to record, including St Joseph's Māori Girls' College Choir Turakina Maori Girls' College Choir in the 1960s. In 1985, the Pātea Māori Club released the song as a reggae pop single, and the New Zealand band Herbs recorded the song as the opening track to their album Sensitive to a Smile in 1987, also in a reggae style.

== Background ==
The origins of the song are not definitively known, however they may come from a late 19th Century/early 20th Century Whanganui River tradition, where marae along the river would create their own lyrics to the song for competitions. The song and tītī tōrea was included in the Girl Scouts of the USA book Games for Girl Scouts.

The first mention in print of the song is as a part of a set-list by a Māori performance group from Puketeraki (near Dunedin) being broadcast on the radio in April 1933.

== Pātea Māori Club version ==
"E Papa"

Single by Pātea Māori Club featuring Dalvanius

from the album Poi E
- Released: November 1985
- Recorded: February 1985
- Studio: Mascot Recording Studios, Auckland.
- Genre: Māori music; Pacific reggae; Reggae-pop
- Length: 3:30
- Label: Maui Records
- Producer: Dalvanius Prime

Pātea Māori Club featuring Dalvanius singles chronology
"Hei Konei Rā" (1984)	"E Papa" (1985)	"Give Them Life" (1985)

The Pātea Māori Club released a Pacific reggae/reggae pop version of the song as their fourth single in late 1985, entitled "E Papa". During their 1984/1985 tour of the United Kingdom, the club performed the song on the UK children's television show Blue Peter. The song peaked at number 41 in New Zealand, and an extended version was included in their 1987 debut album Poi E.

=== Background ===
Dalvanius was inspired to recreate the traditional song as reggae pop. The club performed the song during their 1984/1985 tour of the United Kingdom on the children's television programme Blue Peter, due to the stick game associated with the song. During the tour, Ngoi Pēwhairangi -- lyricist and mentor to the club's producer Dalvanius Prime -- died in late January, when the band had half-completed their album. Dalvanius was deeply affected by this loss, feeling creatively exhausted, unable to write songs without her and unable to record in the studio. Despite this, the band recorded "E Papa" on return to Auckland in February 1985. Fred Faleauto and Dilworth Karaka, members of the Pacific reggae band Herbs, performed on the track.

The song was released as a single in late 1985. The song debuted at number 48 on the Official New Zealand Music Chart in November, however peaked the next week at 41. The single spent a total of eight weeks charting in the top 50 singles. A version entitled "E Papa Waiari" was featured on their 1987 album Poi E, which featured an extended stick outro.

=== Track listing ===
- NZ 7-inch single
1. "E Papa (Part 1)" – 3:30
2. "E Papa (Part 2)" Vocal Instrumental – 3:37
3. "E Papa (Part 3)" U.K. Club Mix – 5:24
4. "Hei Konei Ra (Farewell)" – 3:10
- NZ 7-inch single
1. "E Papa (Part 1)" – 3:35
2. "E Papa (Part 2)" Vocal Instrumental – 3:37

=== Credits and personnel ===
Credits adapted from the Poi E album booklet.

- Greg Carroll – rakau percussion
- Fred Faleauto – rakau percussion
- Victor Grbic – mixing, rakau percussion
- Dave Hurley – engineering, co-production
- Steve Foot Kanuta – rakau percussion
- Wiremu Karaitiana – Emulator II synthesizer, additional arrangement
- Dilworth Karaka – guitar
- Carl Levy – arranger
- Bill Millett – rakau percussion
- Les Palmer – arranger
- Stuart Pearce – keyboard, additional arrangement
- Dalvanius Prime – co-arranger, producer

=== Charts ===
Chart (1985)	Peak position
New Zealand (Recorded Music NZ)	41

== Other recorded versions ==
- St Joseph's Māori Girls' College Choir on Maori Songs of Enchantment (1961) as "E Papa Wairangi"
- Turakina Maori Girls' College Choir on The Maori Girls of Turakina (1967), as "E Papa Waiari (Stick Game)"
- Herbs on Sensitive to a Smile (1987), as "E Papa". Recorded in a pop-reggae style similar to Pātea Māori Club
- Kiri Te Kanawa on Maori Songs (1999), as "E Papa (Titi Torca/E Aue)"
- Lizzie Marvelly on Home (2011)
- George “Fiji” Veikoso on “Born and Raised” (1996)

== Certifications ==
Certifications and sales for E Papa Herbs version
Region	Certification	Certified units/sales
New Zealand (RMNZ)	Platinum	30,000^{‡}
^{‡} Sales+streaming figures based on certification alone.
