= Ngoi Ngoi =

1984 single by Pātea Māori Club

Single by Pātea Māori Club

from the album Poi E
- Released: 1988
- Recorded: July 1987
- Studio: Marmalade Studios, Wellington.
- Genre: Māori music; Pop; Gospel
- Length: 4:25
- Label: Maui Records
- Songwriters: Dalvanius Prime; Lee Fox; Martha Fox; Tui Fox; Ada Haige; Ngaro Herewini; Ara Kopua; Wikitoria Matahiki; Taite Pewhairangi; Noel Raihania
- Producer: Dalvanius Prime

Pātea Māori Club singles chronology
"Ka Huri" (1986)	"Ngoi Ngoi" (1988)	"The New Zealand Expo Song (God Defend New Zealand)" (1988)

"Ngoi Ngoi" is a song by Pātea Māori Club. Originally included in the band's 1987 debut album Poi E, it was released as a single in 1988. A Māori language pop/Gospel song, it was written as a tribute to lyricist Ngoi Pēwhairangi by Dalvanius Prime and people from her community in Tokomaru Bay who were close to her. The single did not chart in the top 40 singles in New Zealand, however, it was nominated for Best Polynesian Album at the 1988 New Zealand Music Awards.

== Background and composition ==
Songwriter and producer Dalvanius Prime wanted to create tribute song for lyricist Ngoi Pēwhairangi, who had worked on the group's previous singles and passed away in early 1988. The song was written in collaboration with people from Pēwhairangi's community in Tokomaru Bay, each writing one line that represented how they felt about Pēwhairangi. Songwriter and producer Dalvanius Prime felt that these lyrics were too sad, so was inspired to create an upbeat Gospel inspired song that would celebrate her life, while keeping the original lyrics.

The song features a spoken introduction by American radio show host Imhotep Gary Byrd from WLIB. It was recorded at Marmalade Studios in Wellington, unlike all other songs from the Poi E album, which had been recorded in Auckland. Vocalists who feature on the song include Annie Crummer, who at the time was a member of the band When the Cat's Away, Moana Maniapoto Jackson, who Prime worked with on a Māori language anti-drink driving song "Kua Makona", and Cara Pewhairangi, Ngoi's niece, who he had worked with for the song "Haere Mai" for the soundtrack of the 1987 film Ngati.

The song was issued as a single in 1988, after the release of the Poi E album. The single was nominated for Best Polynesian Album at the 1988 New Zealand Music Awards, however lost to the group's own Poi E album. The group performed the song on television in 1992, on the magazine show New Zealand Today.

In 2019, the group Tiniwhetū, a group composed of members of the Māori Television Pūkana, released a cover of the song which featured Pēwhairangi's granddaughter, Te Aomihia Pēwhairangi.

== Track listing ==
- NZ 7-inch single
1. "Ngoi Ngoi"
2. "Ngoi Ngoi (Instrumental)"

== Credits and personnel ==
Credits adapted from the Poi E album booklet.

- Gary Byrd – introduction
- Annie Crummer – additional vocals
- Dave Dobbyn – video appearance
- Dale Ferris – additional vocals
- Lee Fox – lyrics
- Martha Fox – lyrics
- Tui Fox – lyrics
- David Ginnane – co-producer, engineer, mixer
- Ada Haige – lyrics
- Ngaro Herewini – lyrics
- Moana Maniapoto Jackson – additional vocals
- Ara Kopua – lyrics
- Wikitoria Matahiki – lyrics
- Dave Parsons – arrangement, Drumulator
- Cara Pewhairangi – additional vocals
- Taite Pewhairangi – lyrics
- Dalvanius Prime – arrangement, producer, songwriter
- Noel Raihania – lyrics
- Ropata Smith – arrangement, keyboards
- Tokomaru Bay Co-op – songwriter
- Rob Winch – arrangement, guitar

== Certifications ==
Region	Certification	Certified units/sales
New Zealand (RMNZ)	Platinum	30,000^{‡}
^{‡} Sales+streaming figures based on certification alone.
