= New Zealand top 50 singles of 2010 =

== Chart ==
The song with the most weeks in chart is Katy Perry's "California Gurls" with Snoop Dogg with 28 weeks. Coming close in second was Taio Cruz's "Dynamite" with 26 weeks but even so none of them received the peak position. The number one spot was achieved by the New Zealand RnB singer J. Williams featuring the rapper Scribe with the single "You Got Me". You Got Me being the first New Zealand annual number 1 single in 6 years since Ben Lummis's "They Can't Take That Away", and Scribe becoming the first artist ever to have 2-year end number 1 singles the other being "Stand Up/Not Many".

The biggest-selling single not to reach number one was Nesian Mystik's "Sun Goes Down"

Key
† – Song of New Zealand origin (Note: Whether or not a song is of New Zealand origin is determined by the RIANZ)

Rank	Artist	Title
1	J. Williams featuring Scribe	"You Got Me"† from the album, Young Love: Collector's Edition)
2	Eminem featuring Rihanna	"Love the Way You Lie" from the album, Recovery
3	Katy Perry featuring Snoop Dogg	"California Gurls" from the album, Teenage Dream
4	Bruno Mars	"Just the Way You Are" from the album, Doo-Wops & Hooligans
5	B.o.B featuring Hayley Williams	"Airplanes" from the album, B.o.B Presents: The Adventures Of Bobby Ray
6	Stan Walker	"Black Box"† from the album, Introducing... Stan Walker
7	Usher featuring will.i.am	"OMG" from the album, Raymond v. Raymond
8	Taio Cruz	Dynamite from the album, Rokstarr
9	Timbaland & Katy Perry	"If We Ever Meet Again" from the album, Shock Value II
10	Nesian Mystik	"Sun Goes Down"† from the album, 99 A.D.
11	Train	"Hey, Soul Sister" from the album, Save Me, San Francisco
12	Katy Perry	"Teenage Dream" from the album, Teenage Dream
13	Travie McCoy featuring Bruno Mars	"Billionaire" from the album, Lazarus
14	Rihanna	"Only Girl (In the World)" from the album, Loud
15	Stan Walker	"Choose You"† from the album, From The Inside Out
16	Brooke Fraser	"Something in the Water"† from the album, Flags
17	Katy Perry	"Firework" from the album, Teenage Dream
18	Dane Rumble	"Cruel"^{‡} from the album, The Experiment
19	Jason Derulo	"In My Head" from the album, Jason Derulo
20	J. Williams featuring Dane Rumble	"Takes Me Higher"† from the single of the same name
21	Justin Bieber featuring Ludacris	"Baby" from the album, My World 2.0
22	Usher featuring Pitbull	"DJ Got Us Fallin' in Love" from the extended play, Versus
23	Far East Movement featuring The Cataracs & Dev	"Like a G6" from the album, Free Wired
24	Flo Rida featuring David Guetta	"Club Can't Handle Me" from the album, Only One Flo (Part 1) and the soundtrack, Step Up 3D
25	Yolanda Be Cool & DCUP	"We No Speak Americano" from the single of the same name
26	Bruno Mars	"Grenade" from the album, Doo-Wops & Hooligans
27	David Guetta featuring Kid Cudi	"Memories" from the album, One Love
28	Adam Lambert	"Whataya Want from Me" from the album, For Your Entertainment
29	Mike Posner	"Cooler Than Me" from the album, 31 Minutes To Takeoff
30	The Black Eyed Peas	"The Time (Dirty Bit)" from the album, The Beginning
31	Lady Gaga	"Bad Romance" from the album, The Fame Monster
32	Lady Gaga & Beyoncé	"Telephone" from the album, The Fame Monster
33	The Naked and Famous	"Young Blood"† from the album, Passive Me, Aggressive You
34	Rihanna	"Rude Boy" from the album, Rated R
35	Cee-Lo Green	"Fuck You" from the album, The Lady Killer
36	Enrique Iglesias featuring Pitbull	"I Like It" from the album, Euphoria
37	Iyaz	"Replay" from the album, Replay
38	Eminem	"Not Afraid" from the album, Recovery
39	David Guetta featuring Chris Willis, Fergie and LMFAO (group)	"Gettin' Over You" from the albums, One More Love & Sorry For Party Rocking
40	Pink	"Raise Your Glass" from the album, Greatest Hits... So Far!!!
41	Kids of 88	"Just a Little Bit"† from the album, Sugarpills
42	Nelly	"Just A Dream" from the album, 5.0
43	Pātea Māori Club	"Poi E"† from the album, Poi E
44	Owl City	"Fireflies" from the album, Ocean Eyes
45	Sean Kingston featuring Justin Bieber	"Eenie Meenie" from the album, My World 2.0
46	Ke$ha	"Tik Tok" from the album, Animal
47	Jay-Z featuring Alicia Keys	"Empire State of Mind" from the album, The Blueprint 3
48	Lady Antebellum	"Need You Now" from the album, Need You Now
49	B.o.B featuring Rivers Cuomo	"Magic (B.o.B song)" from the album, B.o.B Presents: The Adventures Of Bobby Ray
50	Kesha	"We R Who We R" from the extended play, Cannibal

== Top 20 singles of 2010 by New Zealand artists ==
Rank	Artist	Title
1	J. Williams featuring Scribe	"You Got Me"
2	Nesian Mystik	"Sun Goes Down"
3	Stan Walker	"Choose You"
4	Brooke Fraser	"Something in the Water"
5	Dane Rumble	"Cruel"
6	J. Williams featuring Dane Rumble	"Takes Me Higher"
7	The Naked and Famous	"Young Blood"
8	Kids of 88	"Just a Little Bit"
9	Pātea Māori Club	"Poi E"

*numbers 10 through 20 are currently unavailable
