= Aku Raukura =

1984 single by Pātea Māori Club

Single by Pātea Māori Club

from the album Poi E
- Released: June 1984
- Recorded: April 1984
- Studio: Mascot Recording Studios, Auckland.
- Genre: Māori music; Pop
- Length: 4:00
- Label: Maui Records
- Songwriters: Dalvanius Prime; Ngoi Pēwhairangi
- Producer: Dalvanius Prime

Pātea Māori Club singles chronology
"Poi E" (1983)	"Aku Raukura" (1984)	"Hei Konei Rā" (1984)

"Aku Raukura" (English: "My White Feathers"), also known as "Raukura", is a song by Pātea Māori Club. Originally written in sessions with Ngoi Pēwhairangi and Dalvanius Prime in Tokomaru Bay in 1982, it was released as their second single in June 1984, during the chart success of their debut hit "Poi E". The song peaked at number 10 in New Zealand, and was later included in their 1987 debut album Poi E.

== Background and composition ==
The song was written in Tokomaru Bay in 1982, when Dalvanius Prime visited the house of lyricist Ngoi Pēwhairangi. In a single day, the pair had created "Poi E", "Aku Raukura" and "Hei Konei Rā". The song was written to help younger Māori alienated from their culture in a familiar medium, and is a discussion of identity and a request for Urban Māori to reconnect to their roots.

It was first performed to an audience at the 1983 Polynesian Festival alongside "Poi E", in Hastings, New Zealand in February. The track was recorded in April 1984 at Mascot Recording Studios, located on Queen Street, Auckland. The song features Dalvanius' brother Timothy Prime as the kaea (lead vocalist).

The song was released as a single in June 1984, and debuted at number 30 on the charts. However, by late July the single peaked at number 10. In a 1984 episode of the variety show Hui Pacific the group performed the song alongside breakdancers.

At the 1984 New Zealand Music Awards, "Aku Raukura" was nominated for Single of the Year, however lost to The Narcs' "You Took Me (Heart and Soul)". However, the single won the Top Polynesian Award, and the single artwork by Joe Wylie won the Sleeve Design award.

The song was performed at the Seville Expo '92 New Zealand pavilion, by a group led by George and Tangiwai Ria, and including some members of Pātea Māori Club.

== In popular culture ==
Alongside "Poi E", "Aku Raukura (Disco Mix)" appears on the soundtrack to the 2010 film Boy.

== Track listing ==
- NZ 12-inch single and cassette single
1. "Aku Raukura" – 4:00
2. "Poi E" (Monster U.S. Breakdance Mix) – 3:50
3. "Aku Raukura Part 2" – 3:03
4. "Medley" (Live in Concert) "Aku Raukura" "Hei Konei Ra" – 5:05
- NZ 7-inch single
1. "Aku Raukura" – 4:00
2. "Medley" (Live in Concert) "Aku Raukura" "Hei Konei Ra" – 5:05
3. "Poi E" (Monster U.S. Breakdance Mix) – 3:50

== Credits and personnel ==
Credits adapted from the Poi E album booklet.

- Dalvanius Prime – arrangement, producer, songwriting
- Willie Dayson – slide guitar
- Gordon Joll – Drumulator
- Stuart Pearce – keyboard, additional arrangement
- Ngoi Pēwhairangi – songwriting
- Timothy Prime – kaea (vocal lead)
- Tama Renata – guitar, additional arrangement

== Charts ==
Chart (1984)	Peak position
New Zealand (Recorded Music NZ)	10

== Certifications ==
Certifications and sales for "Aku Raukura"
Region	Certification	Certified units/sales
New Zealand (RMNZ)	Gold	10,000^{*}
^{*} Sales figures based on certification alone.
