= Henare te Ua =

New Zealand broadcaster (1933–2007)

Henare te Ua QSM
- Born: 26 March 1933; Rotorua, New Zealand
- Died: 2 May 2007 (aged 74); Auckland, New Zealand
- Relatives: Te Kani te Ua (adopted father); Āpirana Ngata (grandfather)

Henare Raumoa te Ua QSM (26 March 1933 – 2 May 2007) was a New Zealand broadcaster.

== Biography ==
Te Ua was born in Rotorua in 1933 of Ngāti Porou descent. His father, Whiu Te Purei, fought with the 28th (Māori) Battalion in World War II and was killed at Cassino. His mother, Hinehou Ngata, the daughter of Āpirana Ngata, died of tuberculosis in 1938. Consequently, te Ua was adopted by his mother's eldest sister, Rina, and her husband Hetekia Te Kani-ā-Takirau Kerekere Tūhoe te Ua. He was raised in Gisborne and educated at Gisborne Boys' High School before spending a year at Nelson College in 1951.

In 1965, te Ua became a radio announcer at Radio Northland. Based in Whangarei he travelled throughout the region reporting on local news and events. He moved to Radio Geyserland in Rotorua as announcer in charge in 1976 and then to Te Reo o Aotearoa as assistant programme director three years later. There he became involved with Radio New Zealand's Māori programme archive, which later merged with the general programme archive to become Sound Archives Ngā Taonga Kōrero. In 1987, te Ua produced the songs "E Pa To Hau" and "Parihaka-Tewhiti-Tohu-Tawhiao" on Pātea Māori Club's Poi E.

Between 1995 and 2003, te Ua presented the Māori magazine programme Whenua on National Radio.

In the 1992 New Year Honours, te Ua was awarded the Queen's Service Medal for public services. He was recognised for his outstanding contribution to radio at the 1998 New Zealand Radio Awards and he was a recipient of the Sir Kingi Ihaka Award at the 2002 Te Waka Toi Awards by Creative New Zealand.
