= A Man of Passion =

Studio album by Dalvanius
- Released: 2003
- Label: Jayrem Records

Dalvanius chronology
Poi E (1996)	A Man of Passion (2003)

A Man of Passion is a greatest hits album released by New Zealand Māori singer Dalvanius in 2003. The album was released after his death in 2002.

== Track listing ==
1. "Introduction"
2. "Love Train"
3. "Chapel of Love"
4. "Fool Over You"
5. "E Hine"
6. "Funny How Time Slips Away"
7. "Wiley"
8. "Respect Yourself"
9. "Canberra, We're Watching You"
10. "Checkmate on Love"
11. "Voodoo Lady"
12. "Ecstasy"
13. "Who Said That?"
14. "Chudka Pa Poy"
15. "I'll Be Gone"
16. "I'll Be There For You"
17. "Anei Ra"
18. "Hei Konei Ra"
19. "Christmas Tears"
20. "Mary's Boy Child"
21. "White Christmas"
