= Pewhairangi =

Pewhairangi is a surname of New Zealand Māori origin. Notable people with the surname include:

- Api Pewhairangi (born 1992), New Zealand-born Irish rugby league footballer
- Ngoi Pēwhairangi (1921–1985), New Zealand Māori teacher of Māori language

Pewhairangi is also a Māori name for the Bay of Islands.
