= Aotea Utanganui – Museum of South Taranaki =

Museum in Pātea, New Zealand

Coordinates: 39.7545°S 174.4721°E

The Aotea Utanganui – Museum of South Taranaki, formerly known as the South Taranaki District Museum, is located Pātea, South Taranaki, New Zealand. The museum is located on State Highway 3 through Pātea. The central section of the museum is the oldest colonial building in South Taranaki. The museum underwent renovations from 2008 to 2011.

== History ==
It was built in 1869 and housed Taplin and Muir's General Store at the time of the first government sale of town sections in 1870.

The origins of the museum can be found within the Pātea Historical Society. Its inaugural chair, G Livingston Baker QSM, was instrumental in the establishment of a local repository for the history of the former Patea Borough and County Council's, and the families who had settled in the area.

The collection of the museum includes paintings such as Hay-Campbell and Haddon's Arrival of Turi, commissioned in 1933 to commemorate the arrival of the eponymous ancestor of Ngati Ruanui and Ngā Rauru, Turi in the 14th century. Other material relating to the Pātea Māori Club can also be found in the collection.

== Organisation ==
From 2001 South Taranaki District Council provided an annual operating grant to the South Taranaki District Museum Trust. Through the adoption of the South Taranaki District Council's Arts, Culture and Heritage Policy, the Museum Trust and Council entered into a formal partnership which provided the shared objective of providing heritage services across the wider South Taranaki District.

The Trust cares for the collection, on behalf of the wider community of South Taranaki District, and is responsible for the governance. The Council provides the professional staff for the museum.

The museum closed its doors on 13 September 2008 to undergo a million dollar redevelopment, reopening on 30 April 2011. Architectural firm BSM Group Architects Ltd from Wanganui were commissioned to design the complex. Artifacts & great history have been conserved in the design while continuing the story of local iwi. The building was blessed later that year. The museum will have a new roof, larger archive, a public research and reading room, education space, new exhibition spaces and exhibitions, and upgraded collection stores.

== Board ==
- Rosanne Oakes (Chairperson)
- Marie Mackay (Secretary)
- Michelle Dwyer (Treasurer)
- Dave Crompton
- Narlene Ioane
- Barrie Marsh
- Andrew Ritson
- Gloria Tui

== Volunteers ==
- Barrie Marsh (2007 - current)

== Past Directors/Managers/Supervisors ==
- Paul Hewson, Director
- Bridget Woodward, Director
- Raewyn Kahu-Ngarimu, Director
- Warwick Fry, Director
- Wayne P Marriott, Manager Arts, Culture & Heritage
- Libby Sharpe, Manager Arts, Culture & Heritage
- Lynne Walker, Manager Libraries, Arts, Culture & Heritage
