= Maoris on 45 =

1982 medley single by The Consorts

"Maori's on 45"

Single by The Consorts
- Released: May 1982
- Genre: Māori music; Pop
- Length: 3:12
- Label: RCA Victor
- Songwriter: Traditional
- Producer: Dalvanius Prime

Music video
- "Maoris on 45" at NZ On Screen

"Maori's on 45" is a 1982 novelty single by New Zealand group The Consorts, produced by Dalvanius Prime. Inspired by the Dutch hit single "Stars on 45" concept, the song was a Māori language medley of songs performed on the guitar, including "Pā Mai", "Me He Manu Rere", "Hoki Mai e Tama Mā", "E te Hokowhitu" and "Taringa Wairua". The song was a hit in New Zealand, reaching number four.

== Background and composition ==
The song was based on a sparse hand-clap and guitar arrangement. The song was produced by Dalvanius Prime (later known for the Pātea Māori Club), however Prime did not want his name associated with the record. Terence O'Neill-Joyce (of Ode Records) is the listed producer on the single. Prime created the song as a tribute to the songs created at parties on the guitar of his childhood, and the Māori "jingajik" strum style of guitar. The song featured a bridging verse in English, followed by a medley of traditional songs including "Pā Mai", "Me He Manu Rere", "Hoki Mai e Tama Mā", "E te Hokowhitu" and "Taringa Wairua".

The Consorts were a group created specifically for this song, and Prime was commissioned to create the group. One of the members of the group is Jay Laga'aia, later famous as an actor.

The song was a sleeper hit, debuting at number 12 on the New Zealand charts, and five weeks later peaking at number four. The song was the 39th top single of 1982 in New Zealand, with only three other local artists among those having higher placed singles on the annual chart: Split Enz, Sir Howard Morrison and Prince Tui Teka (the latter's single "E Ipo", was another Māori language single produced by Prime, and was the top performing single by a New Zealand artist that year). The success of the song was one of the reasons which led to Prime forming his own record label in 1984 called Maui Records.

== Track listing ==
- NZ 7-inch single
1. "Maori's on 45" – 3:12
2. "Maori's on 45" (Singalong) – 3:12

== Charts ==
Chart (1982)	Peak position
New Zealand (Recorded Music NZ)	4

=== Year-end charts ===
Chart (1982)	Position
New Zealand Singles Chart	39
