= Dalvanius Prime =

- Born: Maui Carlyle (Kararai) Paraima; 16 January 1948; Pātea, New Zealand
- Origin: Taranaki, New Zealand
- Died: 3 October 2002 (aged 54) Hāwera, New Zealand
- Years active: 1975–2002

Maui Dalvanius Prime (16 January 1948 – 3 October 2002) was a New Zealand entertainer and songwriter. His career spanned 30 years. He mentored many of New Zealand's Māori performers, and was a vocal and forthright supporter of Māori culture.

== Early life ==
Born and raised in Pātea, Prime was of Tainui, Ngāpuhi, Ngati Ruanui, Tuwharetoa, Ngā Rauru, Pakakohi and Ngāi Tahu descent. The sixth of 11 children, Prime grew up in a musical household. He attended the Church College of New Zealand located in Temple View, Hamilton during his high school years.

== Career ==
In the late 1960s, Prime moved to Wellington and worked as a cook by day and musician at night. His involvement with the Shevelles, a Māori female vocal trio from Porirua, led to several trips to Australia.

In 1970, Prime travelled to Australia, and in 1973 he performed at the opening of the Sydney Opera House. The dismissal of Australia's Prime Minister Gough Whitlam in 1975 inspired the song Canberra, We're Watching You, a cover of Washington, We're Watching You by the Staple Singers with lyrics adapted to the situation.

In 1983 he formed his own production company, Maui Records. And he became increasingly involved with Māori music. In 1983, Prime recorded the single "Poi E" with the Pātea Māori Club. The single reached number one in New Zealand in 1984 and was later certified 3× Platinum. The song was later included on the Pātea Māori Club album Poi E, released in 1987.

He appeared in the film Te Rua in 1990 and sang the theme song "Chudka Pā Poy", which is about apartheid.

He also worked closely with Ngoi Pēwhairangi, who helped develop Te Kohanga Reo, Māori language pre-school system. He provided the music for many of her lyrics.

== Advocacy ==
Later, Prime became a campaigner for the return of mokomokai (preserved, tattooed human heads) from overseas museums.

Prime was an advocate for young people involved in court cases and victims of domestic violence.

At the 1999 general election, Prime stood for the Piri Wiri Tua Movement in the Te Tai Hauāuru electorate, placing seventh. During the campaign he endorsed Ken Mair who was running for the affiliated Mana Māori Movement.

== Death ==
Prime died in 2002 in Hāwera after a long battle with cancer. He was buried in his family urupa at Nukumaru, South Taranaki, New Zealand.

== Discography ==
=== Albums ===
Title	Album details	Peak chart positions
Title	Album details	NZ
Poi E (among Pātea Māori Club)	Released: 1987; Label: Maui Records, WEA, Jayrem Records; Format: CD, vinyl, cassette	— (Note: The 25th Anniversary Edition charted at number 8 on the New Zealand artists sub-chart in 2016, after the release of Poi E: The Story of Our Song.)
A Man of Passion	Released: 2 May 2003; Label: Maui Records, Jayrem; Format: CD	21
"—" denotes a recording that did not chart.

=== Extended plays ===
Title	Album details
Souvenir (Dalvanius and the Fascinations)	Released: 1973; Label: Reprise Records; Format: 7-inch
Christmas with Dalvanius and the Fascinations (Dalvanius and the Fascinations)	Released: 1973; Label: Reprise; Format: 7-inch

=== Singles ===
Title	Year	Peak chart positions	Certifications	Album
Title	Year	NZ	Certifications	Album
"Love Train" / "Chapel of Love" (Dalvanius and the Fascinations)	1973	—		Souvenir (Note: Only "Chapel of Love" was present on Souvenir.)
"Wiley" (Dalvanius and the Fascinations)	1974	—		Non-album singles
"Canberra, We're Watching You" (Dalvanius and the Fascinations)	1975	—		Non-album singles
"Voodoo Lady" / "Checkmate on Love" (Dalvanius and the Fascinations)	1977	—		Non-album singles
"Ecstasy" (Dalvanius and the Fascinations)	1978	—		Non-album singles
"Poi E" (with the Pātea Māori Club)	1983	1	RMNZ: 3× Platinum	Poi E
"Aku Raukura" (with the Pātea Māori Club)	1984	10	RMNZ: Gold	Poi E
"Hei Konei Ra (Farewell)" (with the Pātea Māori Club) and the Yandall Sisters)	1984	21		Poi E
"E Papa" (with the Pātea Māori Club)	1985	41		Poi E
"Give Them Life" (among New Zealand Music Awards Finale performers and presenters)	1985	—		Non-album single
"Ka Huri" (with the Pātea Māori Club)	1986	—		Poi E
"Haere Mai" (Cara Pewhairangi & Dalvanius)	1986	—		Ngati Original Soundtrack
"Ngoi Ngoi" (with the Pātea Māori Club)	1988	—		Poi E
"The New Zealand Expo Song (God Defend New Zealand)" (Annie Crummer, Peter Morgan, Dalvanius and Patea Maori with the New Zealand Youth Jazz Orchestra)	1988	47		In the Land of the Long White Cloud (Note: Album by Matt Catingub with the New Zealand Youth Jazz Orchestra.)
"Chudka Pa Poy"	1990	—		Non-album singles
"White Christmas" / "Mary's Boy Child" (Dalvanius and the Fascinations)	1992	—		Non-album singles
"—" denotes a recording that did not chart.

== Production and songwriting credits ==
List of songs written or co-written for other artists, showing year released and album name
Title	Year	Artist(s)	Album
"One Man Band"	1969	The Shevelles	Non-album singles
"Maoris on 45"	1982	The Consorts	Non-album singles
"Don't Think You Remember Me"	1982	Prince Tui Teka	The Man, the Music, the Legend
"Let's Fall in Love"	1982	Prince Tui Teka	The Man, the Music, the Legend
"Hold on Tight"	1982	Prince Tui Teka	The Man, the Music, the Legend
"E Ipo"	1982	Prince Tui Teka	The Man, the Music, the Legend
"Before the Next Teardrop Falls"	1982	Prince Tui Teka	The Man, the Music, the Legend
"One by One"	1982	Prince Tui Teka	The Man, the Music, the Legend
"Walking in the Sun (Even a Blind Man)"	1982	Prince Tui Teka	The Man, the Music, the Legend
"Fool Over You"	1982	Prince Tui Teka	The Man, the Music, the Legend
"Only You and You Alone"	1982	Prince Tui Teka	The Man, the Music, the Legend
"A Real Love"	1982	Prince Tui Teka	The Man, the Music, the Legend
"There Are More Questions Than Answers"	1982	Prince Tui Teka	The Man, the Music, the Legend
"Maori Battalion Triolgy: Te Piriti / Maori Battalion"	1982	Prince Tui Teka	The Man, the Music, the Legend
"Party Time"	1983	Taste of Bounty	Non-album singles
"Runnin' & Hiding"	1983	Tama Band	Non-album singles
"Kua Makona"	1986	Moana	Kua Makona / Tahi
"I Have Loved Me a Man"	1990	Mika X	Non-album single
