= Poi E =

Single by Pātea Māori Club

from the album Poi E
- A-side: "Poi E"
- B-side: "Poi-E Instrumental"
- Released: September 1983
- Recorded: 1983
- Genre: Māori music, hip hop
- Length: 3:57
- Label: Maui Records
- Songwriters: Ngoi Pewhairangi, Dalvanius Prime
- Producer: Dalvanius Prime

Pātea Māori Club singles chronology
"Poi E" (1983)	"Aku Raukura" (1984)

"Poi E" is a song by New Zealand group Pātea Māori Club off the album of the same name. Released in 1983, the song was sung entirely in the Māori language and featured a blend of Māori cultural practices in the song and accompanying music video, including Māori chanting, poi dancing, and the wearing of traditional Māori kākahu (garments). The song reached No. 1 in New Zealand in each of the following three decades.

The song topped the New Zealand pop charts for four weeks and also became the biggest seller in New Zealand for 1984, "outselling all international recording artists." Today the song maintains its status as a cult classic in New Zealand, as the group behind it, Patea Maori Club, was a one-hit wonder. However, for Māori, the song is much more important, as it became "the anthem of a new generation", the generation known as the "hip-hop generation". Additionally, the song was a bright spot amidst the gloom of the recent closure of the Patea Freezing Works, which had provided many jobs for the town where the Patea Maori Club was based.

== Background ==
The song was written by Māori linguist Ngoi Pewhairangi; the music was scored by Dalvanius Prime. Pewhairangi's intent in writing the song in such a way was to promote Māori ethnic pride among young Māori people in a popular format. The duo faced indifference from record labels, so Prime produced the song and album under his self-made label, Maui Records. The single was the first release on Maui, which was distributed by WEA.

Without radio play and barely any commercial TV airing, a TV news story is credited with shooting the song up to #1 on New Zealand charts in March 1984. Its popularity that same year grew further when it was well received by British listeners as the Pātea Māori Club toured the United Kingdom, playing at the London Palladium and the Edinburgh Festival, as well as giving a Royal Command Performance. "Poi E" alongside "E Ipo" (1982) by Prince Tui Teka (similarly written by Pewhairangi and produced by Prime) were the first widely successful songs sung in Te Reo Māori in mainstream music, and had a great impact on the promotion of Te Reo and Māori culture in New Zealand.

It briefly re-entered the New Zealand charts in 2009 following its use in a Vodafone promotion. It also made a comeback in 2010 by reaching the New Zealand Top 20 after being featured in the successful New Zealand comedy film Boy. On May 24 that year it reached No.3. "Poi E" is the only New Zealand song to chart over three decades.

== Hip-hop ==
In addition to the Māori cultural influences in the music video for the song, there are interesting influences from hip-hop culture present in the video. Among the most obvious are rapping and breakdancing, and the song itself "combined traditional Māori vocals and show-band and concert-party idioms with gospel and funk", two of hip-hop's own influences as major African-American musical genres. Hip-hop was mixed with the traditional Māori chanting and cultural music because the Pātea Māori Club wanted to give the younger hip-hop generation "their language and culture through the medium they were comfortable with", that medium being hip-hop. At the same time as it was helping to teach the children about Māori culture, hip-hop also "provided Māori youth in particular with a viable substitute for their own culture."

Hip hop already had a hold on the people of New Zealand and the Māori in particular, and Poi-E reinforced it and Māori hip-hop crews continued springing up throughout New Zealand.

== Alternative version ==
The original version of the song without hip hop elements added was judged first equal in the poi song category at the 1983 Polynesian festival in Auckland.

== In popular culture ==
The song was utilised prominently in the New Zealand film Boy (2010), directed by Taika Waititi. In July 2016, a film about the song titled Poi E: The Story of Our Song premiered at the New Zealand International Film Festival. Swedish singer Zara Larsson added the song to the pre-show setlist of her Midnight Sun Tour show in Auckland on 25 October 2026.

== Chart positions ==
=== Weekly charts ===
Chart (1984)	Peak position
New Zealand Singles Chart	1
Chart (2010)	Peak position
New Zealand Singles Chart	3

=== Year-end charts ===
Chart (1984)	Position
New Zealand Singles Chart	1
Chart (2010)	Position
New Zealand Singles Chart	43

== Certifications ==
Certifications and sales for "Poi e"
Region	Certification	Certified units/sales
New Zealand (RMNZ)	4× Platinum	120,000^{‡}
^{‡} Sales+streaming figures based on certification alone.

== Personnel ==
- Dalvanius Prime – arrangement, producer
- Alastair Riddell – electronic drums
- Fred Faleauto – timbales
- Tama Renata – electronic drums, guitar
- David Hurley – engineer, co-producer
