= Pātea =

Town in Taranaki Region, New Zealand

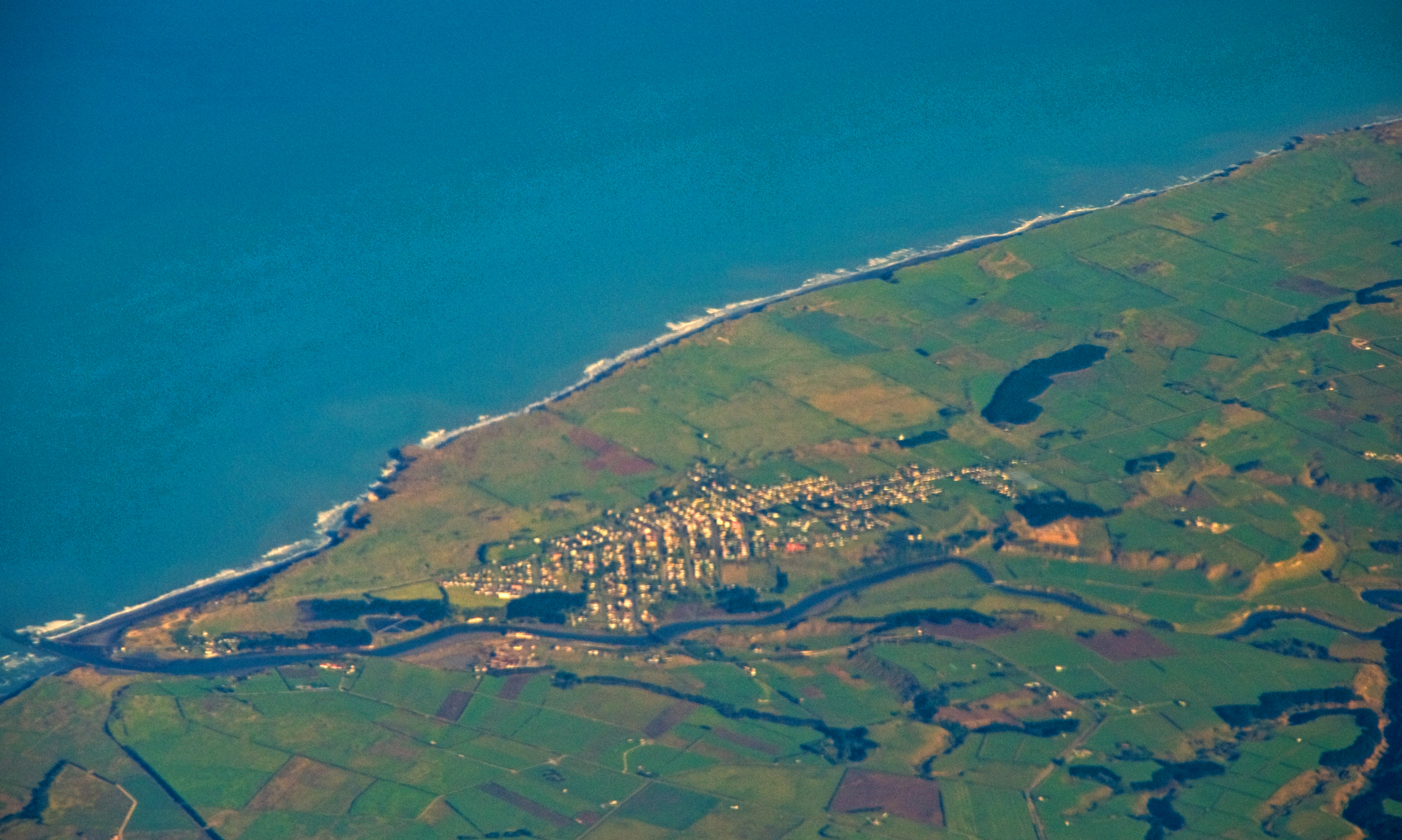
- Aerial photo of Pātea
- Interactive map of Pātea
- Coordinates: 39°45′26″S 174°28′36″E
- Country: New Zealand
- Region: Taranaki
- Territorial authority: South Taranaki District
- Ward: Pātea General Ward; Te Tai Tonga Māori Ward
- Community: Pātea Community
- Electorates: Whanganui; Te Tai Hauāuru (Māori)

Government
  - Territorial Authority: South Taranaki District Council
  - Regional council: Taranaki Regional Council
  - Mayor of South Taranaki: Phil Nixon
  - Whanganui MP: Carl Bates
  - Te Tai Hauāuru MP: Debbie Ngarewa-Packer

Area
  - Total: 6.31 km^{2} (2.44 sq mi)

Population (June 2025)
  - Total: 1,290
  - Density: 204/km^{2} (529/sq mi)
- Postcode(s): 4520

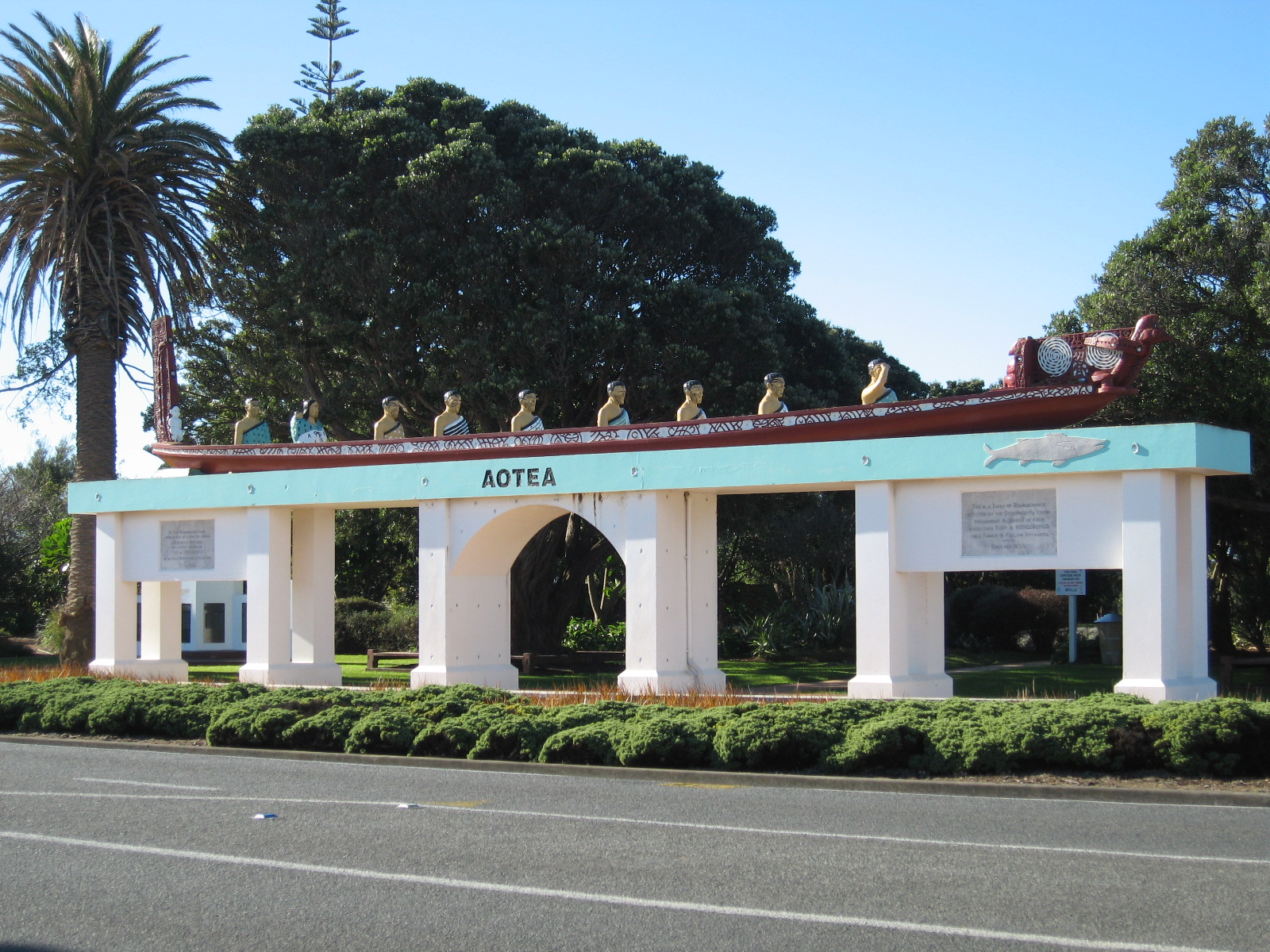
The Aotea canoe remembrance arch in Pātea

Pātea (/pɑːˈtɛər/ pah-TAIR) is the third-largest town in South Taranaki District, New Zealand. It is on the western bank of the Pātea River, 61 kilometres north-west of Whanganui on State Highway 3. Hāwera is 27 km to the north-west, and Waverley 17 km to the east. The Pātea River flows through the town from the north-east and into the South Taranaki Bight.

== History and culture ==
=== Pre-European history ===
Pātea is the traditional final place where some Māori led by Turi aboard the Aotea waka settled, after it was beached at the Aotea Harbour.

=== European settlement ===
Pātea, called Carlyle or Carlyle Beach for a time by European settlers, was originally nearer the Pātea River mouth than the present town. During the New Zealand Wars Pātea was an important military settlement. General Cameron's force arrived at the river mouth on 15 January 1865 and constructed redoubts on both sides of the river.

Pātea became a market town when hostilities ended. The first of the sections on the present town site were sold in 1870. A local shipping company was established in 1872, and harbour improvements began. The Marton-New Plymouth railway line via Pātea was completed in March 1885. The Carlyle Town Board, created about 1877 to administer town affairs, was succeeded by a borough council constituted on 13 October 1881 under the name Patea.

In the 1920s, Pātea was the largest cheese exporting port in the world. The Grader Cool Store received cheese for grading from all over South Taranaki and as far south as Oroua Downs near Himatangi. After grading it was loaded into coastal ships at the grader wharf for transport to Wellington where it was transhipped into overseas ships for export. The port closed in July 1959.

=== Patea Freezing Works ===
In the early 1880s the predecessor to the Patea Freezing Works was established on the eastern bank of the Pātea River. Cool stores for handling dairy produce followed in 1901 with later additions evolving into what became known as the Patea Freezing Co-Op, South Taranaki's primary employer. Strategic reforms, inefficiencies and nationwide over-processing resulted in closure in September 1982. In February 2008 the derelict buildings suffered severe fires. The damage was extensive and with the health hazard presented by asbestos insulation throughout the freezer walls, the town sought demolition.

=== Pātea Māori Club ===
Pātea became known in 1984 as the home of singer Dalvanius Prime and the Pātea Māori Club. Their single, "Poi E", indicated renewed impetus in contemporary Māori popular music.

=== Recent history ===
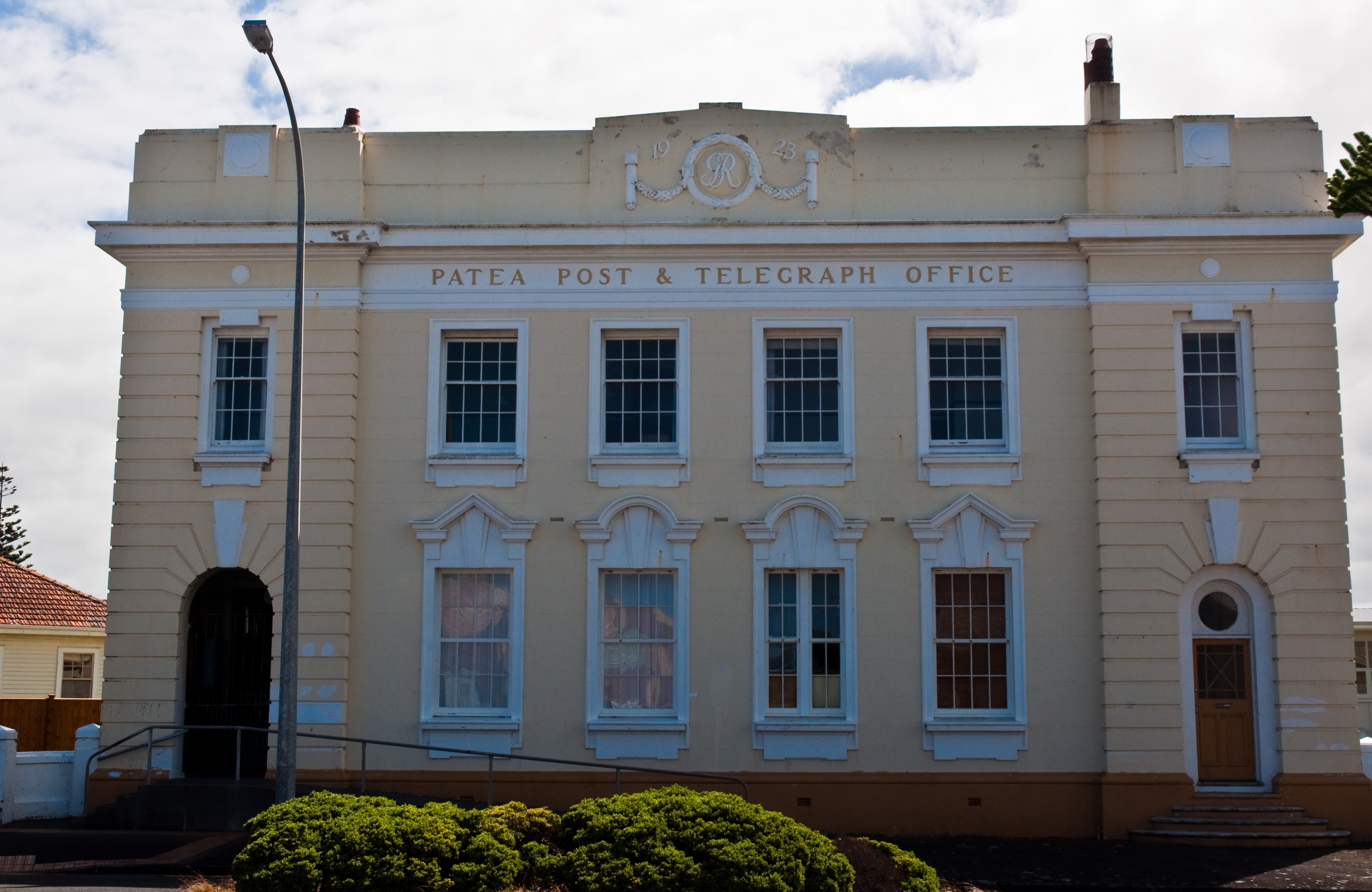
Patea Post Office

Pātea has retained a strong community focus and enjoys many services including a well-resourced medical centre, public swimming pool and trust-owned rest home.

=== Museum ===
Aotea Utanganui – Museum of South Taranaki is in Pātea. The museum's From the Womb to the Tomb: a medical history exhibition shows the history of health in the area and includes items from the Pātea Hospital which closed in 1990.

=== Marae ===
The local Wai o Turi marae and Rangiharuru meeting house are affiliated with the Ngā Rauru hapū of Rangitāwhi.

In October 2020, the Government committed $298,680 from the Provincial Growth Fund to reconstruct the accessway to the marae and expand the carpark, creating 8 jobs.

== Demographics ==
Stats NZ describes Pātea as a small urban area, which covers 6.31 km^{2} (2.44 sq mi). It had an estimated population of 1,290 as of June 2025, with a population density of 204 people per km^{2}.

Historical population
Year	Pop.	±% p.a.
2006	1,143	—
2013	1,128	−0.19%
2018	1,212	+1.45%
2023	1,320	+1.72%
The 2006 population is for a smaller area of 6.15 km^{2}. Source:

Pātea had a population of 1,320 in the 2023 New Zealand census, an increase of 108 people (8.9%) since the 2018 census, and an increase of 192 people (17.0%) since the 2013 census. There were 657 males, 657 females, and 6 people of other genders in 555 dwellings. 2.3% of people identified as LGBTIQ+. The median age was 47.6 years (compared with 38.1 years nationally). There were 261 people (19.8%) aged under 15 years, 195 (14.8%) aged 15 to 29, 564 (42.7%) aged 30 to 64, and 300 (22.7%) aged 65 or older.

People could identify as more than one ethnicity. The results were 60.7% European (Pākehā), 53.6% Māori, 6.8% Pasifika, 1.8% Asian, and 1.1% other, which includes people giving their ethnicity as "New Zealander". English was spoken by 98.0%, Māori by 14.1%, Samoan by 0.2%, and other languages by 2.3%. No language could be spoken by 1.6% (e.g. too young to talk). New Zealand Sign Language was known by 1.1%. The percentage of people born overseas was 7.7, compared with 28.8% nationally.

Religious affiliations were 28.4% Christian, 0.5% Hindu, 7.3% Māori religious beliefs, 0.5% Buddhist, 0.5% New Age, and 1.4% other religions. People who answered that they had no religion were 53.6%, and 8.9% of people did not answer the census question.

Of those at least 15 years old, 69 (6.5%) people had a bachelor's or higher degree, 555 (52.4%) had a post-high school certificate or diploma, and 429 (40.5%) people exclusively held high school qualifications. The median income was $26,500, compared with $41,500 nationally. 27 people (2.5%) earned over $100,000 compared to 12.1% nationally. The employment status of those at least 15 was 336 (31.7%) full-time, 135 (12.7%) part-time, and 48 (4.5%) unemployed.

== Education ==
Pātea Area School is a composite (years 1-13) school with a roll of 179. Patea Public School, later called Patea Primary School, opened in 1875 and started offering secondary education in 1901. Patea High School opened in 1960. The primary and high school merged to form Pātea Area School at the beginning of 2005.

St Joseph's School is a state integrated Catholic contributing primary (years 1-6) school with a roll of 5. The school was established in January 1904.

Both schools are coeducational. Rolls are as of July 2026.

== Notable people ==
- Vera Burt (1927—2017), international cricketer and field hockey player
- Eric D'Ath (1897—1979), professor of pathology and medical jurisprudence at the University of Otago
- Len Keys (1880—1958), lawn bowls player who competed for his country at the 1934 British Empire Games, businessman, one of the pioneers of the Auckland passenger bus service
- Cedric Muir (1912—1975), cricketer, played in one first-class match for Wellington in 1943 and 44
- Denise Newlove (born 1973), Scottish international cricketer
- Debbie Ngarewa-Packer (born 1966 or 1967), Member of Parliament, co-leader of the Māori Party
- Dalvanius Prime (1948—2002), entertainer and songwriter, recorded Poi E with the Pātea Māori Club
- Codey Rei (born 1989), rugby union player
- Alistair Scown (born 1948), rugby union player
- Murray Watts (born 1955), rugby union player
- Cecil J. Wray (1867–1955), sports administrator, represented New Zealand on the International Olympic Committee from 1931 to 1934; he was on the Rugby Football Union in England for 25 years

== Climate ==
Climate data for Patea (1981–2010)
Month	Jan	Feb	Mar	Apr	May	Jun	Jul	Aug	Sep	Oct	Nov	Dec	Year
Mean daily maximum °C (°F)	21.7 (71.1)	21.8 (71.2)	20.7 (69.3)	18.4 (65.1)	16.1 (61.0)	14.3 (57.7)	13.6 (56.5)	13.9 (57.0)	15.5 (59.9)	16.5 (61.7)	18.1 (64.6)	20.4 (68.7)	17.6 (63.7)
Daily mean °C (°F)	18.0 (64.4)	18.1 (64.6)	16.7 (62.1)	14.7 (58.5)	12.8 (55.0)	11.0 (51.8)	10.1 (50.2)	10.4 (50.7)	12.1 (53.8)	13.1 (55.6)	14.4 (57.9)	16.7 (62.1)	14.0 (57.2)
Mean daily minimum °C (°F)	14.3 (57.7)	14.5 (58.1)	12.7 (54.9)	11.1 (52.0)	9.4 (48.9)	7.7 (45.9)	6.6 (43.9)	7.0 (44.6)	8.7 (47.7)	9.8 (49.6)	10.6 (51.1)	13.1 (55.6)	10.5 (50.8)
Average rainfall mm (inches)	99.8 (3.93)	81.0 (3.19)	105.3 (4.15)	135.6 (5.34)	147.4 (5.80)	161.4 (6.35)	175.0 (6.89)	151.8 (5.98)	151.1 (5.95)	158.4 (6.24)	182.4 (7.18)	132.1 (5.20)	1,681.3 (66.2)
Source: NIWA (rain 1991–2020)
