= Te Kani te Ua =

New Zealand tribal leader (1892–1966)

Hetekia Te Kani-a-Takirau Kerekere Tuhoe Te Ua OBE (29 August 1892 – 30 September 1966), commonly known as Te Kani Te Ua, was a notable New Zealand tribal leader, genealogist and orator. Of Māori descent, he identified with the Te Aitanga-a-Māhaki iwi. He was born in Gisborne, New Zealand, in 1892. He married Te Rina Turupa Ngata, the eldest daughter of Sir Āpirana Ngata.

In the 1959 New Year Honours, Te Ua was appointed an Officer of the Order of the British Empire for services to the Māori people.

Broadcaster Henare te Ua was his adopted son.
