= Poi E (album) =

Studio album by Pātea Māori Club
- Released: December 1987
- Recorded: April 1983 – December 1987
- Studios: Mascot (Auckland); Marmalade (Wellington)
- Genres: Māori music, hip hop
- Length: 36:40 (LP release); 50:09 (CD release)
- Label: WEA/Jayrem Records
- Producers: Dalvanius Prime; Dave Ginnane; Dave Hurley; Henare te Ua

Pātea Māori Club chronology
Music of the Maori (1976)	Poi E (1987)

Singles from Poi E
- 1. "Poi E" Released: September 1983; 2. "Aku Raukura" Released: June 1984; 3. "Hei Konei Rā" Released: December 1984; 4. "E Papa" Released: November 1985; 5. "Ngoi Ngoi" Released: 1988

Poi E is an album released by New Zealand Māori music group the Pātea Māori Club. In 1984, the Māori language title track "Poi E" topped the New Zealand pop charts for four consecutive weeks, and was that year's biggest selling single - outselling all international recording artists. The album also produced three other charting singles in New Zealand (Aku Raukura, Hei Konei Rā, and E Papa) but did not chart itself until nearly three decades after its original release.

Dalvanius Prime, the album's producer and leader, was known for merging the styles of traditional Maori show bands and more recent Maori hip-hop.

Later, in the early 1990s, Poi E was produced as a Māori musical with additional songs, and in 2000, selections were performed in Sydney, at the Waitangi Day Concert.

== Development ==
Poi E was recorded almost entirely at Mascot Studios in Auckland over a four-year period from April 1983 ("Poi E") to December 1987 ("He Tangata Tini Hanga," "Ngakau Maru," and "Parihaka - Tewhiti - Tohu - Tawhiao"). The only exception was "Ngoi Ngoi," recorded at Marmalade Studios in Wellington. Prime self-produced the album, financially supported by businesses in Pātea, after being rejected by record labels across New Zealand.

Many of the album's songs are collaborations between Prime and lyricist Ngoi Pēwhairangi. The two began a musical partnership in 1982 after a meeting at Pēwharaingi's Tokomaru Bay home that was initially intended to last a day or two but ultimately went on for weeks due to the pair's songwriting chemistry. "Ngoi Ngoi" - the opener of the second half of Poi E - is a tribute to Pēwhairangi written after her 1985 death, while the album's first side ("E Pa To Hau" to "Hei Konei Rā") traces the history of the iwi of Taranaki.

== Track listing ==
Side one
No.	Title	Writer(s)	Length
1.	"E Pa To Hau"	Traditional	1:02
2.	"Ko Aotea"	Traditional	0:53
3.	"Taranaki Patere - Kahuri"	Traditional	2:59
4.	"Parihaka - Tewhiti - Tohu - Tawhiao"	Dalvanius Prime	4:13
5.	"Nga Ohaki"	Prime; Ngoi Pēwhairangi	2:21
6.	"Ngakau Maru"	Prime; N. Pēwhairangi	2:59
7.	"Hei Konei Rā"	Prime; N. Pēwhairangi	3:13
Total length:			17:40

Side two
No.	Title	Writer(s)	Length
8.	"Ngoi Ngoi"	Prime; Lee Fox; Martha Fox; Tui Fox; Ada Haige; Ngaro Herewini; Ara Kopua; Wikitoria Matahiki; Taite Pēwhairangi; Noel Raihania	4:25
9.	"He Tangata Tini Hanga"	Prime; N. Pēwhairangi	2:28
10.	"E Papa Waiari"	Traditional	4:15
11.	"Aku Raukura"	Prime; N. Pēwhairangi	4:01
12.	"Poi E"	Prime; N. Pēwhairangi	3:51
Total length:			19:00 36:40

Bonus tracks on CD release
No.	Title	Writer(s)	Length
13.	"Haere Mai"	Tuini Ngāwai	2:52
14.	"Kua Makona"	Prime; Ngamaru Raerino	2:51
15.	"Paikea"	T. Pēwhairangi	2:19
16.	"Anei Ra Overture & Aria"	Prime; Raerino	5:27

== Personnel ==
Personnel as listed in the album's liner notes are:

=== Musicians ===
- Dalvanius Prime – arrangements and production (1–12), lead vocals (7)
- Greg Carroll – beach recordings (1), rākau (10), poi piu percussion (12)
- Hohepa Malcolm – kōauau (1)
- Henare te Ua – arrangements (1, 4)
- Maggie Kahu – lead vocals (2, 3, 12), poi piu percussion (12)
- Don Selwyn – narration (2, 3)
- Dave Hurley – arrangements (2, 3)
- Ruka Broughton, Hoani Heremaia – vocals (4)
- Clarence Smith – kōauau (4)
- Pātea Māori Club – haka (4)
- Wiremu Karaitiana – Emulator II synthesizer (4, 6, 9, 10), arrangements (9, 10)
- Ropata Smith – keyboards (4, 8), arrangements (8)
- Haami Prime – lead vocals (5)
- Aunty Lil Rongonui – karanga (5)
- Stuart Pearce – arrangements, keyboards (5–7, 9–12)
- Gordon Joll – Drumulator (5, 11), drums (7)
- Dilworth Karaka – guitar (6, 10)
- Adele Yandall, Mary Yandall, Pauline Yandall – vocals (7)
- Gary Byrd – spoken intro (8)
- Annie Crummer, Dale Ferris – vocals (8)
- Kara Pēwhairangi – vocals (8), lead vocals (13)
- Moana Maniapoto – vocals (8), lead vocals (14)
- Rob Winch – arrangements and guitar (8)
- Dave Parsons – arrangements, Drumulator (8)
- Fred Faleauto – rākau (10), timbales (12)
- Victor Grbic, Steve 'Foot' Kanuta, Bill Millett – rākau (10)
- Carl Levy, Les Palmer – arrangements (10)
- Willie Dayson – slide guitar (10)
- Brent Black Music Co-Op – arrangements (10)
- Timothy Prime – lead vocals (11)
- Tama Renata – arrangements and guitar (11, 12), Syndrum (12)
- Waimarie Cassidy, Huia Davis, Miri Prime, Pauline Prime – poi piu percussion (12)
- Alastair Riddell – Drumulator (12)

=== Production ===
- Henare te Ua – recording (1), production (1)
- John Jones – engineering (1)
- Dave Hurley – production (2, 3, 5–7, 10, 12), engineering (5–7, 10, 12)
- Dave Ginnane – engineering, mixing, production (8)
- Victor Grbic – mixing (10)
- Phil Yule – recording (10)
- Joe Wylie – cover artwork

== Charts ==
Chart (2016)	Peak position
New Zealand Aotearoa Albums (RMNZ)	8
