= Patea Freezing Works =

Slaughterhouse in New Zealand

Coordinates: 39°45′40″S 174°29′11″E

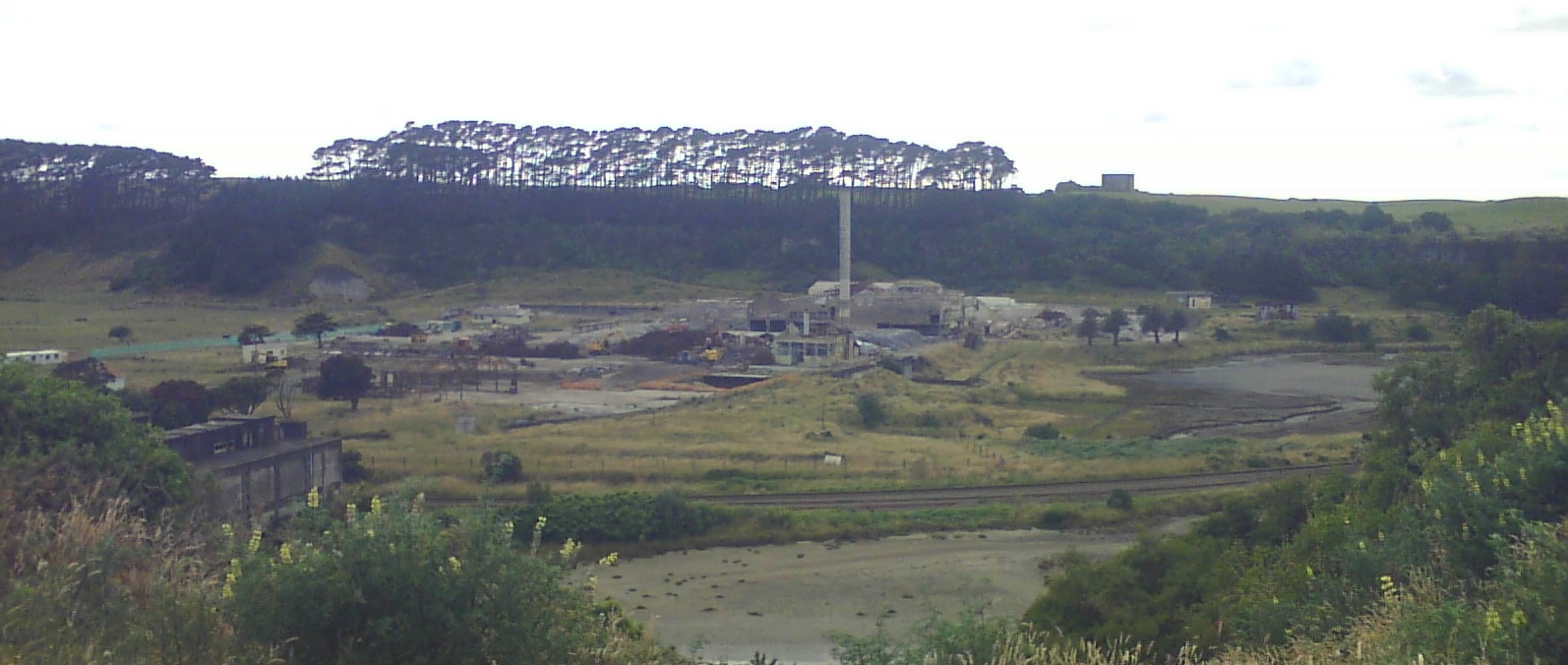
Patea Freezing Works during demolition January 2010

The Patea Freezing Works was a meat-processing plant promoted by The Patea A&P Association in the town of Pātea. The West Coast Meat and Produce Export Company was formed in August 1883 and operated a tinning plant and tallow factory in the area. Changes in technology saw the company change from canning to freezing in 1904.

The Patea Freezing Company came into being in 1910. In 1933, a new Patea Freezing Company was formed and at times provided work for nearly 1000 workers during peak season. However, the company suffered badly during the downturn in the New Zealand meat-processing industry in the early 1980s. The Patea works were among the first to close down, ending operations in September 1982. At the time The Patea Freezing Works was owned by the British Vestey Group.

Since the closure the site had fallen derelict.

Residents regarded the area as a health hazard and blamed its high visibility from the highway as being partly responsible for a decline in property values over the years. "The works has been a thorn in everyone's side for 25 years. This eyesore is our identity, it's Taranaki's eastern gateway and it's absolutely shocking what's been allowed to happen there." said former Pātea Mayor Norm McKay, who worked at the freezing works for 29 years.

Parts of the site were owned by the South Taranaki District Council and Escada Enterprises of Sydney, Australia

The site was riddled with asbestos cladding and insulation, chemicals, heavy metals, boiler ash dumps, rusting fuel storage tanks and collapsing structures.

On Wednesday 6 February 2008 a large part of the Patea Freezing Works was destroyed by fire.

During August 2009 Nikau Contractors were awarded the contract to demolish and clear the Patea Freezing works site. Nikau Contractors was chosen from eight companies that tendered to do the work.

The chimney, which wasn't the original freezing works chimney, was toppled on 19 February 2010. This was despite support from local Iwi, and the South Taranaki Mayor Ross Dunlop, to explore the possibility of preserving the chimney as a monument. Such preservation had not been budgeted for in the site cleanup and would likely have ended up being paid for by local ratepayers.

Video of the toppling of the chimney is available on YouTube. A link is provided in the External links section below.

Demolition was completed in mid 2010.
