= Tītī tōrea =

Polynesian game

Tītī tōrea is a Māori game which uses wooden sticks, known as tītī, and is usually played by two or more players by throwing these sticks to each other. It is often performed in Polynesia, as well as in the Polynesian Cultural Center in Honolulu, O'ahu, Hawai'i, United States. It is a game involving sticks and a beat of three usually. Some tītī tōrea are used to practice hand eye coordination and to improve male warriors.

Song popular songs performed to tītī tōrea include "E Papa Waiari" and "Hurihuri".
