= Poi (performance art) =

Object swinging performance art

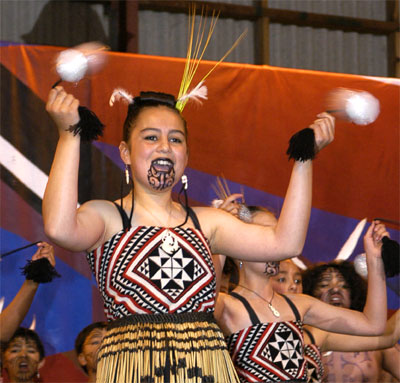
Traditional poi performance using short style poi

Poi is a performing art and also the name of the equipment used for its performance. As a skill toy, poi is an object or theatrical prop used for dexterity play or an object manipulation. As a performance art, poi involves swinging tethered weights through a variety of rhythmical and geometric patterns. Poi artists may also sing or dance while swinging their poi. Poi can be made from various materials with different handles, weights, and effects (such as fire).

Poi originated with the Māori people of New Zealand, where it is still practised today. Poi has also gained a following in other countries. The expansion of poi culture has led to a significant evolution of the styles practised, the tools used, and the definition of the word "poi".

== Māori culture ==
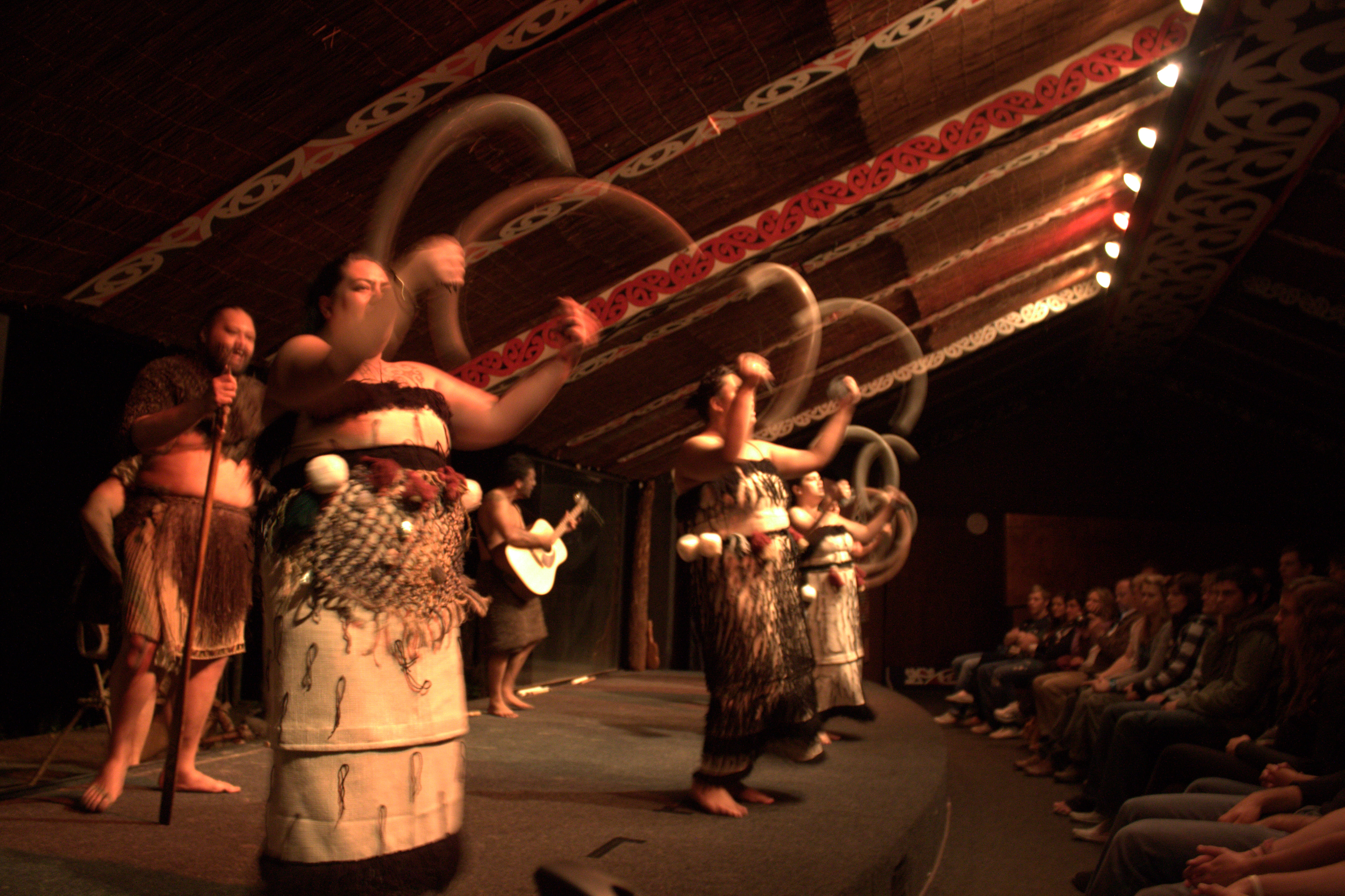
A dance using traditional poi at Tamaki Māori Village

In the Māori language, poi can mean the physical objects used by the dancers, the choreography itself, or the accompanying music. In Māori culture, poi performance is usually practised by women. Some legends indicate that it was first used by men to develop wrist flexibility for the use of hand weapons such as the club-like patu, mere, and kotiate, but recent academic study has found no evidence to confirm this story.

Māori poi come in two forms: short, with strings equal to the length of the fingertips to the wrist; and long, with strings equal to the distance from fingertips to shoulder. A performance includes storytelling and singing in conjunction with choreographed poi routines and is often presented alongside other disciplines, such as waiata a ringa, haka and tītī tōrea (included in kapa haka performances). Poi feature in the 1980s hit song "Poi E".

=== Traditional construction ===
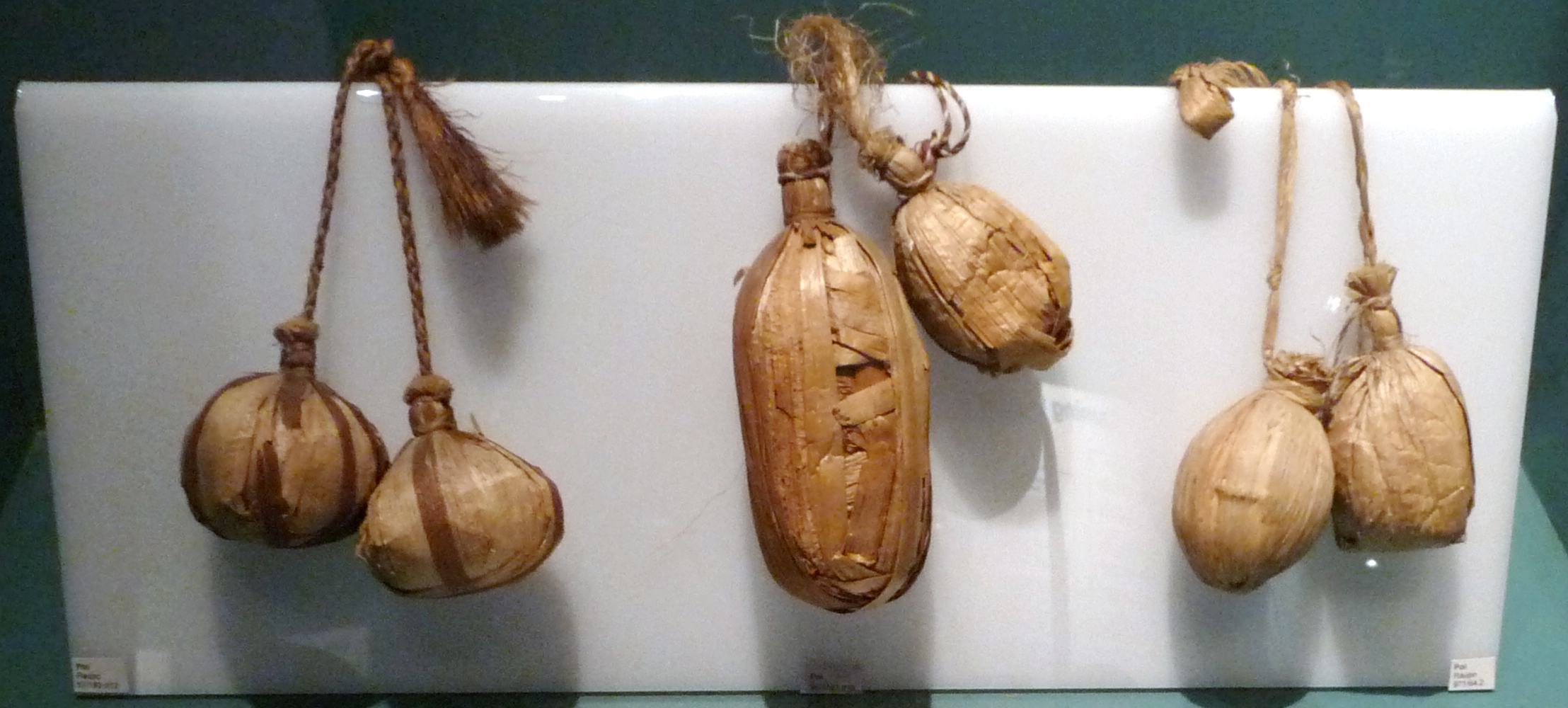
Early 20th-century Māori poi at the South Canterbury Museum in Timaru, New Zealand. They are of raupō and stuffed with newspaper.

Originally, poi were most commonly made from harakeke (New Zealand flax, Phormium tenax) and raupō (Typha orientalis). Makers stripped and scraped flax to provide the muka (inner flax fibre), which was twisted into two strands to make the taura (cord) as well as the aho (ties). A large knot was tied at one end of the cord, around which the core was formed from the pithy middle of the raupō stem. Dampened strips of raupō stems were then wrapped around the ball and tied off around the cord, forming the covering. The other end of the cord was often decorated with a mukamuka, a tassel made from muka formed around a smaller knot. Occasionally, smaller tassels called poi piu were affixed to the base of the poi ball. Construction and design varied widely depending on regional, tribal, and personal preferences.

Another variety of poi is poi tāniko. In this construction, the outer shell was made of finely woven muka using a pattern based on a fishing net; these poi sometimes included strands that were dyed yellow to form a diamond pattern known as Te Karu ō te Atua (the Eye of God).

In the late 19th century and the first half of the 20th century, a cottage industry developed from the manufacture of raupō poi for sale to tourists, especially in the Rotorua area. Tourist-friendly variations included miniature poi that could be worn in buttonholes and as earrings.

Today, most performance poi are made from durable and readily available modern materials. Cores are often made of foam or crumpled paper, while skins consist of plastic or loomed fabrics, such as tulle. Tassels are usually made of wool.

== Modern poi ==
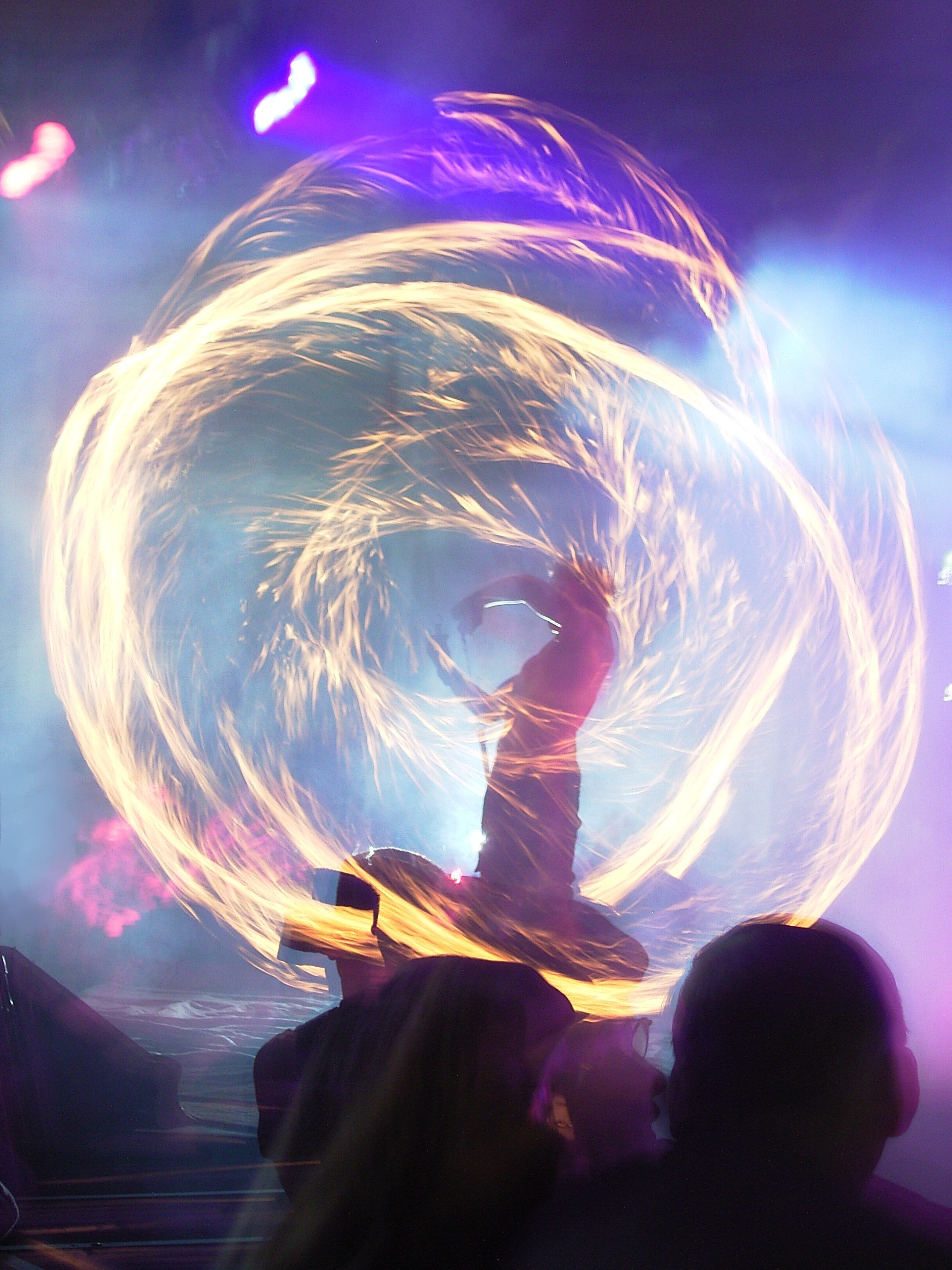
Performer with fire poi

Modern poi coexists with traditional Māori poi and enjoys a broader, worldwide audience.

Traditional Māori poi is generally performed in group choreography at cultural events, with vocal and musical accompaniment. By contrast, modern poi is generally performed by individuals, without singing and with less structured choreography. The tools and styles used are more varied. Many people first encounter poi in the form of fire spinning, but fire spinning is just one form of this highly varied art.

Modern poi borrows significantly from other physical arts, including various schools of dance and many object manipulation arts. Poi is practised around the world and can often be seen at large festivals like Burning Man and the European Juggling Convention.

Unlike many physical arts, learning poi does not usually involve formal education. Most spinners learn from each other or teach themselves using online resources. A strong sense of community and self-teaching are key elements of modern poi.

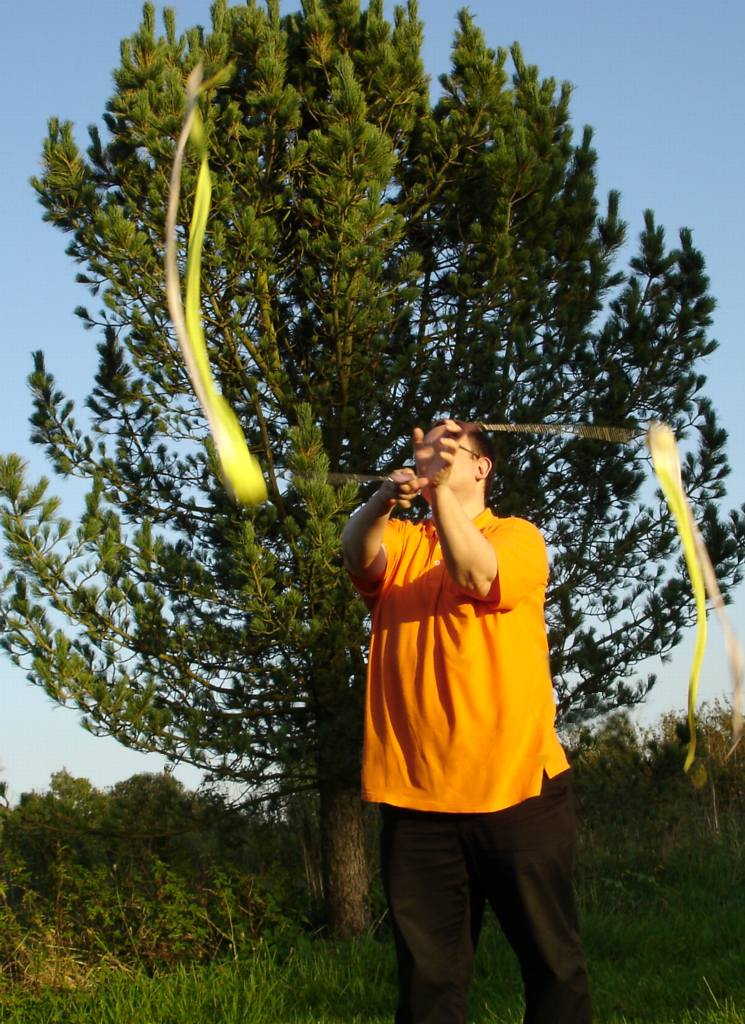
Poi with tails

=== Practice poi ===
Beginners often learn using a simple pair of practice poi, which are typically constructed from soft materials such as socks or stockings that are weighted with soft household objects such as bean bags, juggling balls, balloons filled with legumes, or small toys. Simple poi can also be constructed from tennis balls and lengths of rope.

More advanced practice poi models can include swivels (for orbital-type tricks), weighted handles (for tosses), or incorporate contact stage balls to enable the spinner to execute contact poi moves (i.e., rolls and fishtails).

=== Performance poi ===
Performers often use poi with bright, contrasting colours to enhance aesthetics and emphasise patterns. Some performance poi also incorporate tails or streamers for visual effect.

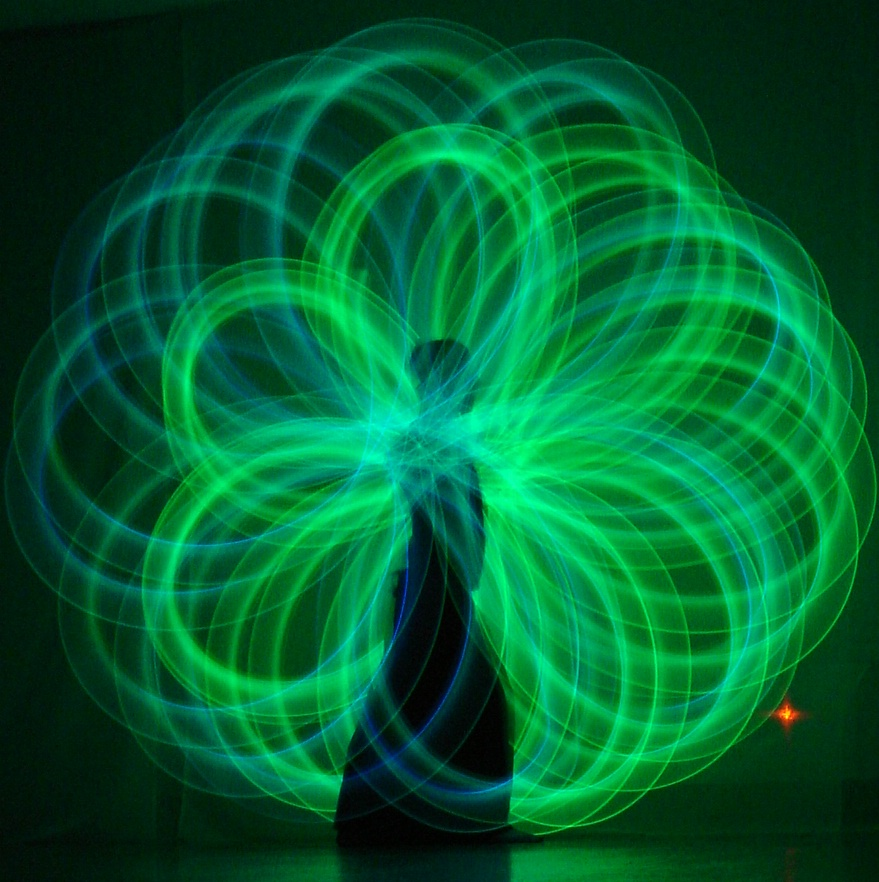
Glow poi

=== Glow poi ===
Poi can be performed in the dark to dramatic effect when spinners use poi containing a light source, such as UV-sensitive materials, LED lights, or chemical glow sticks. Glowstringing, or using glowsticks swung from shoelaces, is popular at festivals and raves. It is also noted that while poi focuses on the manipulation of the head (the other side of the cord/chain from where you are holding), glowstringing focuses on the manipulation of the cord.

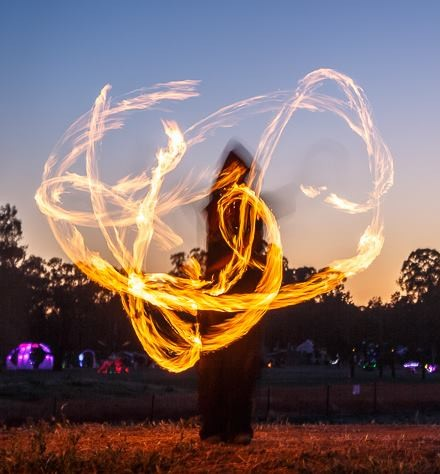
Fire poi

=== Fire poi ===
Fire poi use wicks made from Kevlar or Technora or another flame resistant material for the weighted ends. The wicks are soaked in fuel, set on fire, and then spun for dramatic effect.

== Health benefits ==
A scientific study conducted at the University of Auckland showed significant improvements in grip strength, balance, and attention after one month of poi practice.

== See also ==
- Bolas
- Circus skills
- Diabolo
- Eskimo yo-yo
- Fire dancing
- Hooping
- Juggling
- Meteor hammer
