= Sun Goes Down (Nesian Mystik song) =

Single by Nesian Mystik

from the album 99 A.D.
- Released: 8 February 2010
- Genre: Pop
- Length: 4:02
- Label: Arch Dynasty/Warner
- Songwriters: David Atai, Donald McNulty, Feleti Strickson-Pua, Heathdale Manukau, Teawanui Reeder and Vaevae Rikiau

Nesian Mystik singles chronology
"Sacrifice" (2009)	"Sun Goes Down" (2010)

"Sun Goes Down" is a single by Nesian Mystik, released on 8 February 2010. It is the second single from 99 A.D., their fourth studio album. It peaked at number three on the New Zealand Singles Chart, and was certified gold in its seventh week on the chart. It has since been certified platinum.

The track has been a success on New Zealand radio, particularly on Urban Radio Stations nationwide. The track ascended to number one on 16 March 2010 and has remained the most played song on urban radio for ten consecutive weeks.

== Certifications ==
Certifications for "Sun Goes Down"
Region	Certification	Certified units/sales
New Zealand (RMNZ)	5× Platinum	150,000^{‡}
^{‡} Sales+streaming figures based on certification alone.
