= Tuini Ngāwai =

Māori songwriter

Tuini Moetū Haangū Ngāwai (5 May 1910 – 12 August 1965) was a Māori songwriter, performer, teacher, shearer and cultural adviser. Through contemporising Māori waiata during World War II, Ngāwai contributed to the Māori renaissance.

== Biography ==
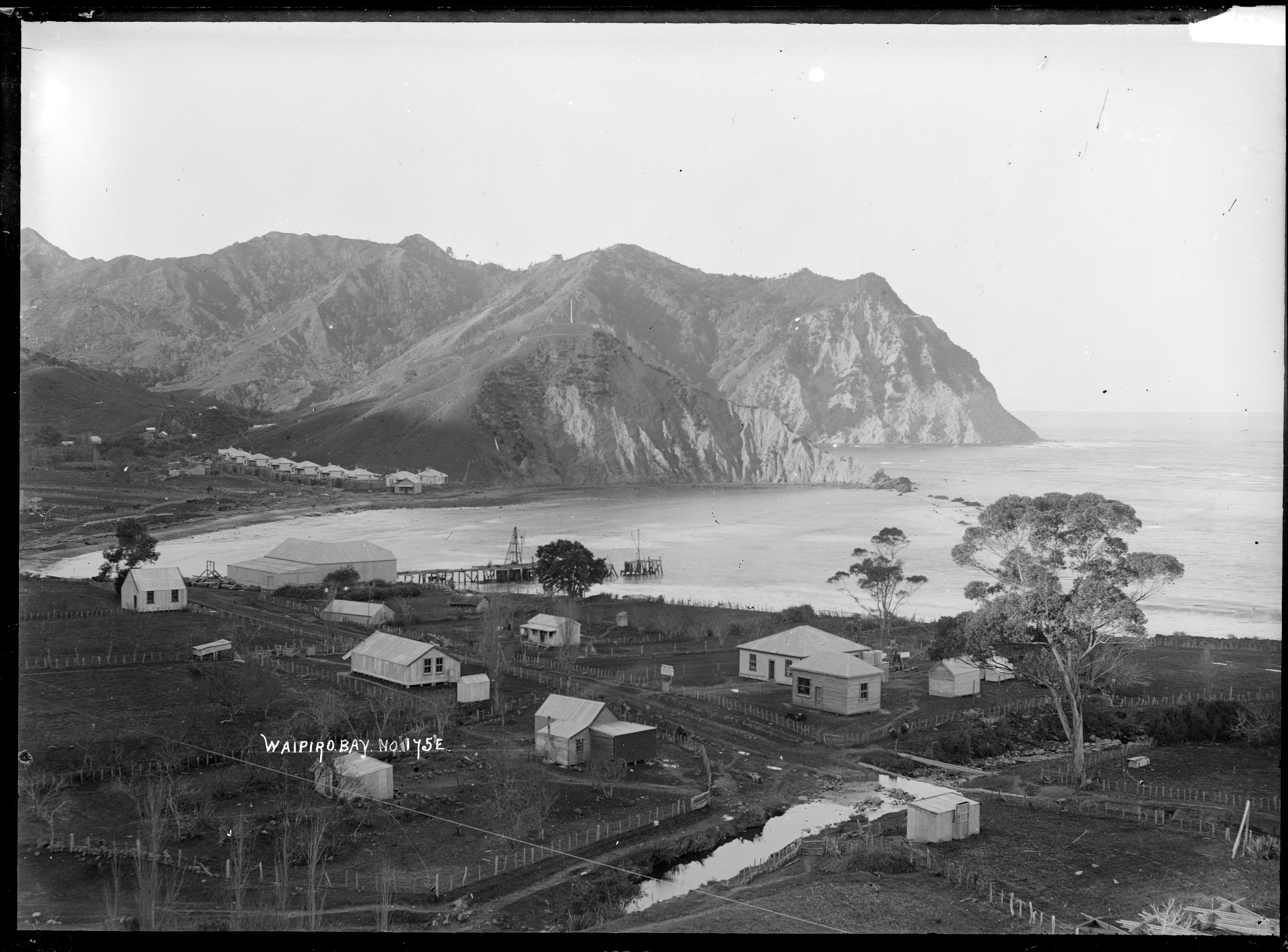
View of the northern end of Tokomaru Bay. Image taken between 1910–1930

Her iwi is Ngāti Porou and her hapū is Te Whanau a Ruataupare. Born at Tokomaru Bay, her twin sister died in infancy, and Moetū was given the name Tuini, a transliteration of twin. Ngāwai taught Māori culture in schools, leaving in 1946 to work as a shearing gang supervisor.

Her niece Ngoi Pēwhairangi was also a composer. The Museum of New Zealand Te Papa Tongarewa holds a photograph of Ngāwai and Ngoi Pewhairangi performing with Ngāwai's concert party Te Hokowhitu-ā-Tū.

== Performance work ==
Tuini Ngāwai composed many songs using European tunes, to encourage Māori pride to raise morale among Māori at home and at the war. Her legacy is recognised by contemporary kapa haka performers and composers, and it is thought she created over 200 concert party works.

She was considered a protégé of Āpirana Ngata. Many, such as "Hoki mai e tama mā" and "E te Hokowhitu-a-Tū" (to the tune of "In the Mood") are still sung today. In 1939 she founded the Te Hokowhitu-ā-Tū Māori kapa haka group, this was to acknowledge the local men and boys who went to war with C Company as part of the 28th Māori Battalion. The religious song "Arohaina Mai" became the unofficial hymn of the Māori Battalion. Recordings of some of her work are held in the sound collection of Ngā Taonga Sound and Vision and the Alexander Turnbull Library.

Ngāwai's songs were used to promote and demand the honouring of the Treaty of Waitangi by Māori activists.

== Death ==
Ngāwai died in August 1965. Her funeral ceremony (tangihanga) was held in the meeting house Te Hono-Ki-Rarotonga, at Pakirikiri Marae in Tokomaru Bay.

== Awards ==
In 2022 Ngāwai was inducted into the New Zealand Music Hall of Fame.
