= Jayrem Records =

New Zealand record company

Jayrem Records is a New Zealand record company founded by James ('Jim') Moss in 1975 under the name Record and Cassette Distribution. Moss changed the name to Jayrem Records in 1981 and released the first singles on that label in 1982. Moss stated at the time: "Musicians should write and play music, not waste time and talent running around trying to promote and sell. their records ... that's where people like myself can help out". Moss owned the Chelsea Records chain of record shops during the 1980s and was able to identify niche markets that weren't being catered for by other labels. Initially concentrating on alternative rock and indie music, the Wellington-based company was, for many years, the main rival to South Island based Flying Nun Records, and produced records which had a similar sound to its southern compatriot, though concentrating less on the Dunedin-sound groups which formed a major part of Flying Nun's repertoire. Jayrem's repertoire extended into Urban Pasifika and Māori music, as well as folk/roots and reggae. They also imported labels from overseas.

Over 200 albums have been released on the Jayrem label, with notable releases from artists ranging from Upper Hutt Posse and Dalvanius Prime to Jordan Reyne and Cassandra's Ears.
