= Ngoi Pēwhairangi =

New Zealand composer (1921–1985)

Te Kumeroa "Ngoingoi" Pēwhairangi QSM (29 December 1921 – 29 January 1985) was a prominent teacher of, and advocate for, Māori language and culture, and the composer of many songs, including Poi E. She spearheaded the Māori Renaissance in the late 1970s and early 1980s.

== Biography ==
She was born Te Kumeroa Ngoingoi Ngāwai on 29 December 1921 at Tokomaru Bay, on New Zealand's East Coast. She was the eldest of five children of Hori Ngāwai, a labourer and minister in the Ringatū faith from the Te Whānau-a-Ruataupare hapū of the Ngāti Porou iwi of Tokomaru Bay, and his wife Wikitoria Karu of Ngāti Tara Tokanui in the Hauraki region. Tuini Ngāwai, a prominent composer and promoter of Māori language and culture, was her father's sister.

Ngoi attended Hukarere Girls’ School from 1938 to 1941. In the early 1940s, she travelled around New Zealand in a fundraising drive for the war effort with the Hokowhitu-ā-Tū Concert Party. Her aunt Tuini Ngāwai, who founded the group, trained her in kapa haka performance and groomed her for leadership. She continued her involvement after the war.

In 1945, she married Rikirangi Ben Pēwhairangi of Tokomaru Bay. The only child of the marriage was a son, Terewai Pēwhairangi, but they fostered many other children.

Ngoi taught Māori language and tutored the Māori club at Gisborne Girls' High School for three years from 1973. In 1974 she also began teaching a course of Māori studies in Gisborne for the University of Waikato. In 1977, Kara Puketapu, the new secretary of the Department of Māori Affairs called on her assistance in setting up Tū Tangata, a scheme that targeted at-risk Māori youth in the cities, and attempted to connect them with their iwi. She continued working for the Department as an adviser, and was involved in the preliminary consultations that led to the establishment of the kōhanga reo movement, which saw children receiving their schooling in Māori.

From 1978 on, she was an adviser to the National Council of Adult Education. In this capacity she promoted Māori language and culture around the country, especially in rural areas. She was the co-founder, with Katerina Mataira, of the Te Ataarangi programme of teaching Māori, which was the basis of a TV programme and a series of books, Te reo (1985).

In music, she is best known as the composer of the poi song Poi E, which topped New Zealand charts in 1984 in a recording by Dalvanius Prime and the Pātea Māori Club, and sold 15,000 copies. She also wrote the popular song E Ipo which was performed by Prince Tui Teka.

She died in Tokomaru Bay on 29 January 1985. Her tangihanga (funeral) was held at Pākirikiri Marae. A waiata tangi (lament) composed for her by Tīmoti Kāretu was for a number of years the signature piece of the kapa haka group of the Te Tumu School of Māori, Pacific and Indigenous Studies at the University of Otago.

== Honours and awards ==
In the 1978 New Year Honours, Pēwhairangi was awarded the Queen's Service Medal for community service. In 2016, she was posthumously conferred with the Nostalgia Award from the Variety Artists Club of New Zealand, an award presented to an artist deemed not to have received suitable honours during their career. In 2022 Pēwhairangi was inducted into the New Zealand Music Hall of Fame.
