= Māori music =

Traditional Māori music, or pūoro Māori, is composed or performed by Māori, the indigenous people of New Zealand, and includes a wide variety of folk music styles, often integrated with poetry and dance.

In addition to these traditions and musical heritage, since the 19th-century European colonisation of New Zealand, Māori musicians and performers have adopted and interpreted many of the imported Western musical styles. Contemporary rock and roll, soul, reggae, and hip hop all feature a variety of notable Māori performers.

== Traditional forms ==
Auckland Mayor Len Brown, and Waitemata Community Board members Pippa Coom and Christopher Dempsey singing a waiata

=== Waiata ===
Songs (waiata) are sung solo, in unison, or at the octave. Types of songs include lullabies (oriori), love songs (waiata aroha), and laments (waiata tangi). Traditionally all formal speeches are followed by a waiata sung by the speaker and their group of supporters. Some of the smaller wind instruments are also sung into, and the sound of the poi (raupō ball swung on the end of a flax cord) provides a rhythmic accompaniment to waiata poi.

=== Mōteatea ===
Captain Cook, who visited the New Zealand archipelago in the late-18th century, reported that the Māori sang a song in "semitones". Others reported that the Māori had no vocal music at all, or sang discordantly. In fact, the ancient chants, or mōteatea, to which Cook was referring, are microtonal and repeat a single melodic line, generally centred on one note, falling away at the end of the last line. It was a bad omen for a song to be interrupted, so singers would perform in subgroups to allow each subgroup to breathe without interrupting the flow of the chant. Mervyn McLean, in "Traditional Songs of the Maori", first notated the microtonality in a significant number of mōteatea in 1975.

Ngā Mōteatea, collected by Sir Āpirana Ngata (1874-1950), is an important collection of traditional song lyrics.

=== Karanga ===
A karanga is a formal, ceremonial call and response at the start of a pōwhiri (welcome ceremony) and is common on a marae. Karanga are carried out almost exclusively by women and in the Māori language. It is a special role and there are guidelines around who is best placed to carry out the karanga that are dependent on the protocols of each pōwhiri. Woman performing the call are called kaikaranga, the call comes from the host group and also from the visitor group, a name for the person from the visitor group is also kaiwhakautu. Skilled kaikaranga encapsulate important information about the group and the purpose of the visit.

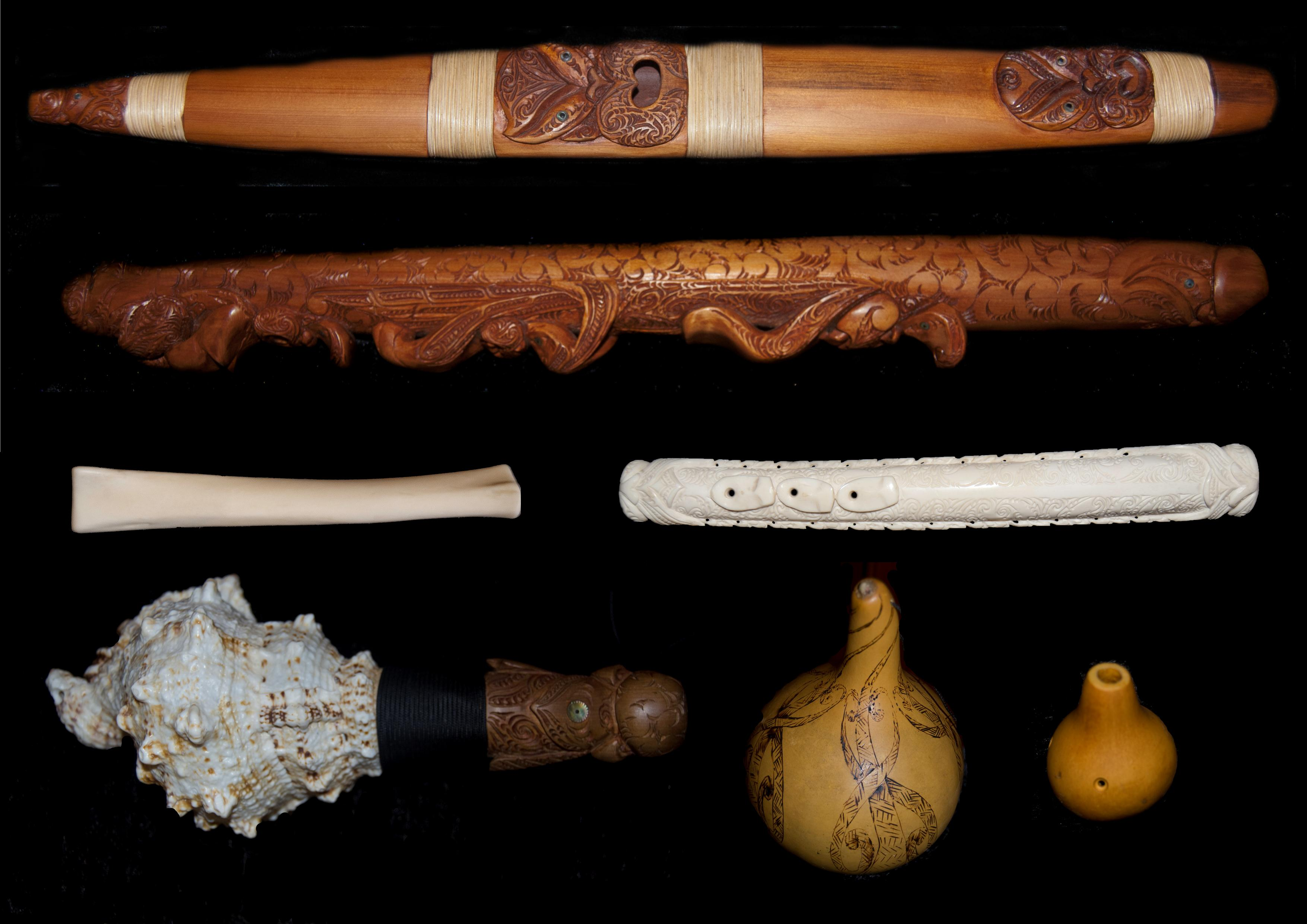
A selection of Taonga pūoro from the collection of Horomona Horo

=== Taonga pūoro (traditional Māori musical instruments) ===
There is a rich tradition of wind, percussion and whirled instruments known by the collective term taonga pūoro. The work of researchers and enthusiasts such as Richard Nunns, Hirini Melbourne, and Brian Flintoff has provided a wealth of knowledge and information around the sounds, history and stories of these instruments, which included various types of flutes, wooden trumpets, percussion instruments and bull-roarers.

=== Revival of traditional music ===
As part of a deliberate campaign to revive Māori music and culture in the early 20th century, Āpirana Ngata invented the "action song" (waiata-a-ringa) in which stylised body movements, many with standardised meanings, synchronise with the singing. He, Tuini Ngāwai and the tourist concert parties of Rotorua developed the familiar performance of today, with sung entrance, poi, haka ("war dance"), stick game, hymn, ancient song and/or action song, and sung exit. The group that performs it is known as a kapa haka, and in the last few decades, competitions within iwi (tribes) and religious denominations regionally and nationally, have raised their performances to a high standard.

In 1964, The Polynesian Festival (which became the Aotearoa Traditional Māori Performing Arts Festival and is now known as Te Matatini), was founded with the express purpose of encouraging the development of Māori music.

== Contemporary Māori music ==
While the guitar has become an almost universal instrument to accompany Maori performances today, this only dates from the mid 20th century. Earlier performers used the piano or violin. Tours of travelling Hawaiian musicians like Ernest Kaʻai and David Luela Kaili to New Zealand in the 1900s to 1920s introduced the Māori to steel guitars and the ʻukulele which were readily adopted with innovations from their own sonoral traditions. Some modern artists such as Hinewehi Mohi, Tiki Taane, Maisey Rika and Taisha Tari have revived the use of traditional instruments.

Ngata and Tuini Ngawai composed many songs using European tunes, to encourage Māori pride and, from 1939, to raise morale among Māori at home and at the war. Many, such as "Hoki mai e tama mā" and "E te Hokowhiti-a-Tū" (to the tune of "In the Mood") are still sung today. More recently, other styles originating overseas, including jazz, swing and rock have been incorporated. In the 1980s and 1990s, Hirini Melbourne composed prolifically in an adapted form of traditional style (His Tīhore mai te rangi seldom ranges outside a major third, and Ngā iwi e outside a fourth) and groups like Herbs created a Māori style of reggae. Traditional heavy metal is prevalent in Māori societies today with the heavy guitar usage similar to Blues rock style of string picking. One example of "Te Reo Metal" is the Thrash metal band, Alien Weaponry.

By the 1970s, Māori music had become a very minor part of New Zealand broadcasting. In 1973, only 15 minutes of Māori music was played on New Zealand airways per week. In the 1980s, a number of songs sung in te Reo became hits in New Zealand, including "The Bridge" (1981) by Deane Waretini, "Maoris on 45" (1982) by the Consorts and "E Ipo" (1982) by Prince Tui Teka. The largest of these was "Poi E" performed by the Pātea Māori Club, which became the top single of 1984.

After the 1986 Te Reo Māori claim at the Waitangi Tribunal (Wai 11), which argued that Māori language was a taonga (treasure) that the New Zealand Government was obliged to protect, Māori music and Māori language broadcasting became used as a means to promote Māori language and culture. In the 1980s and 1990s, local iwi radio stations were established in New Zealand, and in 1990 the government reserved radio frequencies specifically for the promotion of Māori language and culture. These stations included Radio Waatea, Radio Tainui, Tahu FM and Mai FM (which was later sold to MediaWorks as a commercial urban contemporary radio station). Two government agencies began to fund Māori music: NZ On Air and Te Māngai Pāho. In the 1990s, musicians such as Moana and the Moahunters, Southside of Bombay and Hinewehi Mohi ("Kotahitanga") released high profile songs that were sung in or included Te Reo Māori lyrics. Many Māori musical acts since the 1980s have been influenced by African-American music genres and reggae.

From 1998 until 2010, NZ On Air produced compilation albums of Māori music for radio stations, entitled Iwi Hit Disc, in a similar vein to the organisation's Kiwi Hit Disc series. These albums were intended to showcase Māori music which had potential crossover potential to other radio formats. During this time period, very few songs sung in Māori had major success. In 2014, as a challenge to repeat the success of "Poi E", musicians Stan Walker, Ria Hall, Troy Kingi and Maisey Rika released the song "Aotearoa" for te Wiki o te Reo Māori. The song reached number two on the New Zealand singles chart.

In 2019, to mark the 20th anniversary of the 1999 Rugby World Cup semi-final where Hinewehi Mohi performed the national anthem in te reo, Mohi created Waiata / Anthems, an album where 11 New Zealand musicians re-recorded songs into te reo Māori, including Six60, Stan Walker, Benee, Drax Project and Bic Runga. The album was a commercial success, debuting at number 1 on the Official New Zealand Music Chart, and became one of the most successful albums of 2019 in New Zealand. Due to the success of the project, Waiata / Anthems became an annual project, where original songs and songs re-recorded in te reo Māori would be released, coinciding with Te Wiki o te Reo Māori. Some of the most successful songs from 2021 included "35" by Ka Hao featuring Rob Ruha, and "Pepeha" by Six60. In mid-2021, Recorded Music NZ began publishing a chart of the top songs sung in Te Reo Māori in New Zealand.

=== Māori show bands ===
Māori show bands formed in New Zealand and Australia from the 1950s. The groups performed in a wide variety of musical genres, dance styles, and with cabaret skills, infusing their acts with comedy drawn straight from Māori culture. Some Māori show bands would begin their performances in traditional Māori costume before changing into suits and sequinned gowns. Billy T. James spent many years overseas in show bands, beginning in the Maori Volcanics. The Howard Morrison Quartet was formed in the mid-1950s. Their 1959 parody of "The Battle of New Orleans" called "The Battle of the Waikato" became one of their biggest hits and a parody of "My Old Man's a Dustman" called "My Old Man's an All Black" was topical because of the controversy over Māori players not being allowed to tour apartheid South Africa with the 1960 All Blacks in South Africa. The quartet disbanded in 1965 and Morrison went onto a successful solo career. After establishing a reputation in Wellington in the 1950s, the Maori Hi Five played numerous styles and proved very popular. The band went to Australia and later to the United States where they worked in clubs and casinos. Prince Tui Teka joined the Maori Volcanics in Sydney in 1968. In 1972 he began a solo career, returning to New Zealand.

=== Awards ===
The Aotearoa Music Awards began awarding the Polynesian record of the year in 1982. In 1992, this category developed into the Aotearoa Music Award for Best Māori Artist; initially as Best Maori Album in 1992 and 1993. Between 1996 and 2003, two awards were released: Best Mana Maori Album for works embodying Māori music, and Best Reo Maori Album for works sung in te reo Māori. In 2003, the APRA Awards began awarding the Maioha Award, to recognise excellence in contemporary Māori music. The first Waiata Māori Music Awards were held in 2008, acknowledging both contemporary and traditional genres.

== See also ==
- List of folk music genres including the Māori styles: Haka, Oro, Patere, Waiata.
- Kapa haka
- Music of New Zealand
- List of Māori composers
- Waiata / Anthems, a 2019 compilation album by New Zealand artists, with songs recorded in Māori language.
