= Lights of the Pacific: The Very Best of Herbs =

Greatest hits album by Herbs
- Released: 22 November 2008
- Recorded: 1981–2008
- Genre: Pacific reggae
- Length: 79:26
- Label: Warner Music New Zealand

Herbs chronology
Listen: The Very Best of (2001)	Lights of the Pacific: The Very Best of Herbs (2008)

Lights of the Pacific: The Very Best of Herbs is a greatest hits album released in 2008 by New Zealand reggae group Herbs.

== Track listing ==
No.	Title	Writer(s)	Original release	Length
1.	"Karanga Rā"	Traditional	Long Ago (1984)	0:29
2.	"Long Ago"	Willie Hona; Tama Lundon	Long Ago (1984)	4:19
3.	"French Letter"	Dilworth Karaka; Toni Fonoti; Spencer Fusimalohi	Light of the Pacific (1983)	4:36
4.	"Homegrown"	Lundon; Karaka; Charles Tumahai; Joe Walsh; Thom Nepia; Morrie Watene; Gordon Joll	Homegrown (1990)	4:16
5.	"Sensitive to a Smile"	Karaka; Tumahai; Todd Casella	Sensitive to a Smile (1987)	4:29
6.	"Dragons and Demons"	Fonoti	What's Be Happen? (1981)	4:38
7.	"Slice of Heaven" (Dave Dobbyn and Herbs)	Dave Dobbyn	Footrot Flats: The Dog's Tale (1986)	4:36
8.	"Azania (Soon Come)" (1990)	Ross France	Homegrown (1990)	4:27
9.	"Parihaka" (Tim Finn and Herbs)	Tim Finn	Single version; original on Tim Finn (1989)	4:17
10.	"Good for Life"	Graham Fordyce; Rob Winch	Non-album single (1994)	2:44
11.	"Jah's Son"	Fusimalohi	Light of the Pacific (1983)	6:20
12.	"Nuclear Waste"	Hona; Lundon; Rob van de Lisdonk	Long Ago (1984)	4:25
13.	"Rust in Dust"	Karaka; Tumahai	Sensitive to a Smile (1987)	3:25
14.	"Listen"	Hona; Lundon; Casella	Sensitive to a Smile (1987)	4:31
15.	"Light of the Pacific"	Karaka; Fonoti	Light of the Pacific (1983)	6:50
16.	"No Nukes (The Second Letter to France)"	Karaka; Tumahai	Sensitive to a Smile (1987)	4:13
17.	"See What Love Can Do" (Annie Crummer with Herbs)	Jerry Lynn Williams	Language (1992)	4:36
18.	"Sensitive to a Smile" (performed by Hollie Smith)	Karaka; Tumahai; Casella	Previously unreleased	4:09
19.	"E Pāpā"	Traditional	Sensitive to a Smile (1987)	2:06
Total length:				79:26

== Charts ==
=== Weekly charts ===
Chart (2008-2009)	Peak position
New Zealand Albums (RMNZ)	8

=== Year-end charts ===
Chart (2008)	Position
New Zealand Albums (RMNZ)	33

== Certifications ==
Region	Certification	Certified units/sales
New Zealand (RMNZ)	2× Platinum	30,000^{‡}
^{‡} Sales+streaming figures based on certification alone.
