= 13 Years (Best Of) =

13 Years of Herbs: The Best of

Greatest hits album by Herbs
- Released: 1993
- Recorded: 1981–1993
- Genre: Pacific reggae
- Length: 74:18
- Label: Warner Music New Zealand

Herbs chronology
Homegrown (1990)	13 Years of Herbs: The Best of (1993)	Listen: The Very Best of (2001)

13 Years of Herbs: The Best of is a greatest hits album released in 1993 by New Zealand reggae group, Herbs.

== Track listing ==
No.	Title	Writer(s)	Original release	Length
1.	"Karanga Rā"	Traditional	Long Ago (1984)	0:29
2.	"French Letter"	Dilworth Karaka; Toni Fonoti; Spencer Fusimalohi	Light of the Pacific (1983)	4:37
3.	"Sensitive to a Smile"	Karaka; Charles Tumahai; Todd Casella	Sensitive to a Smile (1987)	4:29
4.	"Long Ago"	Willie Hona; Tama Lundon	Long Ago (1984)	4:25
5.	"Slice of Heaven" (with Dave Dobbyn)	Dave Dobbyn	Footrot Flats: The Dog's Tale (1986)	4:39
6.	"Listen"	Hona; Lundon; Casella	Sensitive to a Smile (1987)	4:32
7.	"Homegrown"	Karaka; Tumahai; Lundon; Gordon Joll; Thom Nepia; Morrie Watene; Joe Walsh	Homegrown (1990)	4:17
8.	"Dragons and Demons"	Karaka; Fonoti; Fusimalohi	What's Be Happen? (1981)	4:45
9.	"Nuclear Waste"	Hona; Lundon; Rob van de Lisdonk	Long Ago (1984)	4:25
10.	"Light of the Pacific"	Karaka; Fonoti	Light of the Pacific (1983)	6:50
11.	"No Nukes"	Karaka; Tumahai	Sensitive to a Smile (1987)	4:13
12.	"Amazing Grace"	Traditional	Homegrown (1990)	0:44
13.	"Jah's Son"	Fusimalohi	Light of the Pacific (1983)	6:20
14.	"Anthem"	Karaka; Tumahai; Lundon; Joll; Nepia; Watene; Walsh	Homegrown (1990)	5:04
15.	"Azania (Soon Come)" (1990)	Ross France	Homegrown (1990)	4:28
16.	"Till We Kissed" (featuring Ray Columbus)	Barry Mann; Cynthia Weil	Previously unreleased	4:29
17.	"Rust in Dust"	Karaka; Hona; Tumahai	Sensitive to a Smile (1987)	3:26
18.	"E Pāpā"	Traditional	Sensitive to a Smile (1987)	2:06
Total length:				74:18

== Weekly charts ==
Chart (1994)	Peak position
New Zealand Albums (RMNZ)	14
