= Listen: The Very Best Of =

Listen: The Very Best of

Greatest hits album by Herbs
- Released: 2001
- Recorded: 1982–1995
- Genre: Pacific reggae
- Length: 74:47
- Label: Warner Music New Zealand

Herbs chronology
| 13 Years of Herbs: The Best of (1993) | Listen: The Very Best of (2001) | Lights of the Pacific: The Very Best of Herbs (2008) |

Listen: The Very Best of is a greatest hits album released in 2001 by New Zealand reggae group Herbs. The album reached number one on the New Zealand music charts.

== Track listing ==
| No. | Title | Writer(s) | Original release | Length |
|---|---|---|---|---|
| 1. | "Karanga Rā" | Traditional | Long Ago (1984) | 0:29 |
| 2. | "Long Ago" | Willie Hona; Tama Lundon | Long Ago (1984) | 4:19 |
| 3. | "Good for Life" | Graham Fordyce; Rob Winch | Non-album single (1994) | 2:44 |
| 4. | "On My Mind" | Hona; Lundon | Long Ago (1984) | 4:18 |
| 5. | "Parihaka" (Tim Finn and Herbs) | Tim Finn | Single version; original on Tim Finn (1989) | 4:17 |
| 6. | "Light of the Pacific" | Dilworth Karaka; Toni Fonoti | Light of the Pacific (1983) | 6:50 |
| 7. | "Homegrown" | Lundon; Karaka; Gordon Joll; Thom Nepia; Charlie Tumahai; Morrie Watene; Joe Walsh | Homegrown (1990) | 4:16 |
| 8. | "Till We Kissed" (with Ray Columbus) | Barry Mann; Cynthia Weil | Non-album single (1993) | 4:29 |
| 9. | "E Pāpā" | Traditional | Sensitive to a Smile (1987) | 2:06 |
| 10. | "French Letter ’95" | Karaka; Fonoti; Spencer Fusimalohi | Non-album single (1995) | 3:41 |
| 11. | "Slice of Heaven" (Dave Dobbyn with Herbs) | Dave Dobbyn | Footrot Flats: The Dog's Tale (1986) | 4:36 |
| 12. | "Rust in Dust" | Hona; Karaka; Tumahai | Sensitive to a Smile (1987) | 3:25 |
| 13. | "Sensitive to a Smile" | Karaka; Tumahai; Todd Casella | Sensitive to a Smile (1987) | 4:29 |
| 14. | "Jah’s Son" | Fusimalohi | Light of the Pacific (1983) | 6:20 |
| 15. | "Listen" | Hona; Lundon; Casella | Sensitive to a Smile (1987) | 4:31 |
| 16. | "No Nukes" | Karaka; Tumahai | Sensitive to a Smile (1987) | 4:13 |
| 17. | "Nuclear Waste" | Hona; Lundon; Rob van de Lisdonk | Long Ago (1984) | 4:25 |
| 18. | "See What Love Can Do" (Annie Crummer with Herbs) | Jerry Lynn Williams | Language (1992) | 4:35 |
| 19. | "Amazing Grace" | Traditional | Homegrown (1990) | 0:44 |
| Total length: | | | | 74:47 |

== Charts ==
=== Weekly charts ===
| Chart (2002) | Peak position |
|---|---|
| New Zealand Albums (RMNZ) | 1 |

=== Year-end charts ===
| Chart (2002) | Position |
|---|---|
| New Zealand Albums (RMNZ) | 49 |

== Certifications ==
| Region | Certification | Certified units/sales |
|---|---|---|
| New Zealand (RMNZ) | 2× Platinum | 30,000^{^} |
^{^} Shipments figures based on certification alone.
