= Music of New Zealand =

The music of New Zealand has been influenced by a number of traditions, including Māori music, the music introduced by European settlers during the nineteenth century, and a variety of styles imported during the twentieth century, including blues, jazz, country, rock and roll, reggae, and hip-hop, with many of these genres given a unique New Zealand interpretation.

Pre-colonial Māori music consisted mainly of a form of microtonal chanting and performances on instruments called taonga pūoro: a variety of blown, struck and twirled instruments made out of hollowed-out wood, stone, whale ivory, albatross bone, and human bone. In the nineteenth century, European settlers - the vast majority of whom were from Britain and Ireland - brought musical forms to New Zealand including brass bands and choral music, and musicians began touring New Zealand in the 1860s. Pipe bands became widespread during the early 20th century.

In recent decades, a number of popular artists have gone on to achieve international success including Lorde, Split Enz, Crowded House, Rosé, OMC, Bic Runga, Benee, Kimbra, Ladyhawke, The Naked and Famous, Fat Freddy's Drop, Savage, Gin Wigmore, Keith Urban, Flight of the Conchords, Brooke Fraser and Alien Weaponry.

New Zealand has a national orchestra, the New Zealand Symphony Orchestra, and many regional orchestras. A number of New Zealand composers have developed international reputations. The best-known include Douglas Lilburn, John Psathas, Jack Body, Gillian Whitehead, Jenny McLeod, Gareth Farr, and Ross Harris.

== Māori music ==
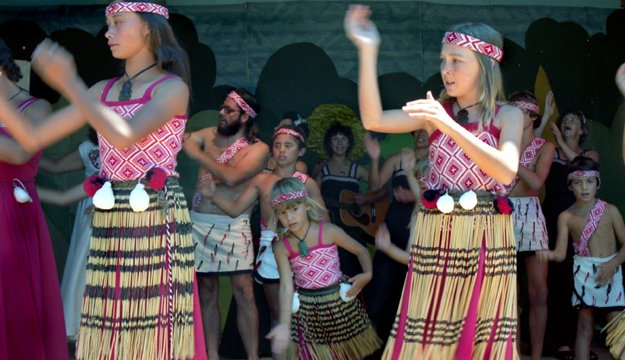
Māori culture group at the 1981 Nambassa festival

Pre-Colonial Māori produced a range of music including song (waiata). The haka is a form of song that is accompanied with movement. Songs included lullabies, laments and love songs, and as an oral culture were used for education, to remember history and many other things.

The emotionally charged circumstances under which waiata were composed are reflected in their highly poetic language, which is rich with allusion, metaphor and imagery. (Rawinia Higgins and Arini Loader 2014)

Songs and music were part of the entertainment held at a whare tapere that also included 'storytelling, songs and singing, dance and dancing, musical instruments, puppets' and games.

Pre-Colonial Māori music was not in 12 tone equal temperament due to there being no Western music influence, making it microtonal. This is seen in the lasting traditional song poetry form mōteatea and some microtonal techniques such as glissando slides utilised in modern waiata. SOUNZ Centre for New Zealand Music published a series in 2021 called He Reo Tawhito: Conversations about Mōteatea where Crystal Edwards interviewed various specialists including Te Ahukaramū Charles Royal, Hōhepa Te Rito, Hana O'Regan and Taiarahia Black.

=== Taonga pūoro ===
Pre-Colonial instrumental music used taonga pūoro (Māori: taonga pūoro, lit. 'musical treasures or heirlooms') - a variety of blown, struck and twirled instruments made out of hollowed-out wood, stone, whale ivory, albatross bone, and human bone. The pūkāea (wooden trumpet), hue (gourd), and pūtātara (conch-shell trumpet) fulfilled many functions within pre-colonial Māori society, including a call to arms, announcing the dawning of a new day, communications with the gods and the planting of crops. From the late 20th century Dr Richard Nunns (1945–2021), Hirini Melbourne (1949–2003), and Brian Flintoff revived the use of taonga pūoro.

=== Contemporary Māori music ===
European settlers brought new harmonies and instruments, which Māori composers gradually adopted. The action song (waiata-ā-ringa) largely developed in the early 20th century. Māori also gravitated towards Hawaiian music from artists like Ernest Kaʻai and David Lucla Kaili that toured New Zealand in the 1900s to 1920s, leading the adoption of steel guitars pioneered by Eruera Mati Hita.

In the mid- to late-20th century, Māori singers and songwriters like Howard Morrison (1935–2009), Prince Tui Teka (1937–1985), Dalvanius Prime (1948–2002), Moana Maniapoto (1961- ) and Hinewehi Mohi (1964- ) developed a distinctive Māori-influenced style. Some artists; like Alien Weaponry have released Māori-language songs, and the Māori traditional art of kapa haka (song and dance) has had a resurgence.

==== Māori show-bands ====
Māori show-bands formed in New Zealand and Australia from the 1950s. The groups performed in a wide variety of musical genres, dance styles, and with cabaret skills, infusing their acts with comedy drawn straight from Māori culture. Some Māori show-bands would begin their performances in traditional Māori costume before changing into suits and sequinned gowns. Billy T. James (1949–1991) spent many years overseas in show bands, beginning in the Maori Volcanics.

== Radio airplay ==
The New Zealand recording industry began to develop from 1940 onwards. The Recording Industry Association of New Zealand (RIANZ) publishes New Zealand's official weekly record charts. The Association also holds the annual New Zealand Music Awards which were first held in 1965 as the Loxene Golden Disc awards.

Despite the vitality of New Zealand bands in the pub scene, for many years commercial radio was reluctant to play locally produced material and by 1995 only 1.6% of all songs played on commercial radio stations were of New Zealand origin. In 1997 a government Kiwi Music Action Group was formed to compel radio stations to broadcast New Zealand music. The group initiated New Zealand Music Week and in 2000 this grew into New Zealand Music Month. By 2005 New Zealand content averaged between 19 and 20 percent.

== Popular music ==
=== Pop ===
New Zealand's first pop song was "Blue Smoke", written in the 1940s by Ruru Karaitiana. Pixie Williams recorded the song in 1949 and, although it went triple platinum in New Zealand, the award for selling 50,000 copies of the song was only presented to Pixie Williams on 13 July 2011. The advent of music television shows in the 1960s led to the rise of Sandy Edmonds, one of New Zealand's first pop stars.

==== Split Enz and Crowded House ====
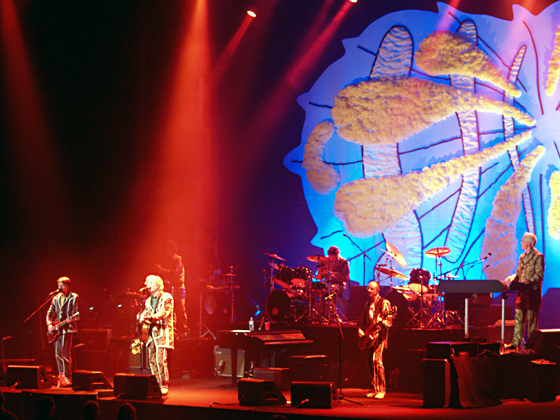
Split Enz performing in June 2006

Formed in the early 1970s and variously featuring Phil Judd and brothers Tim Finn and Neil Finn, Split Enz achieved chart success in New Zealand, Australia, and Canada ‒ most notably with their 1980 single I Got You – and built a cult following elsewhere. The music videos for some of the band's 1980s songs were among the first played on MTV. In 1985, Neil Finn formed pop rock band Crowded House in Melbourne, Australia. The other founding members were Australians Paul Hester and Nick Seymour. Later band members included Neil's brother Tim Finn and Americans Mark Hart and Matt Sherrod. Originally active from 1985 to 1996, the band had consistent commercial and critical success in Australia and New Zealand and international chart success in two phases, beginning with their self-titled debut album, Crowded House, which reached number twelve on the US Album Chart in 1987 and provided the Top Ten hits, Don't Dream It's Over and Something So Strong. Further international success came in the UK and Europe with their third and fourth albums, Woodface and Together Alone and the compilation album Recurring Dream, which included the hits "Fall at Your Feet", "Weather with You", "Distant Sun", "Locked Out", "Instinct" and "Not the Girl You Think You Are". Queen Elizabeth II bestowed an OBE on both Neil and Tim Finn in June 1993 for their contribution to the music of New Zealand.

==== Dave Dobbyn ====
After the dissolution of his band DD Smash, singer-songwriter Dave Dobbyn began a successful solo career, writing the soundtrack music for the animated feature film Footrot Flats: The Dog's Tale in 1986. The film yielded two hit singles: "You Oughta Be In Love" (1986) and the chart-topping "Slice of Heaven" (1986), recorded with the band Herbs. After the release of the film, "Slice of Heaven" became one of Dobbyn's best-known songs, frequently used in tourism advertisements aired on Australian television that encouraged people to visit New Zealand. With the success of the song in Australia, Dobbyn settled in Australia.

Dobbyn's hit song "Loyal" (1988) from his debut solo album Loyal (1988) was used as an anthem for Team New Zealand's unsuccessful 2003 America's Cup defence.

In 2005, Dobbyn released his sixth solo album, Available Light. It received popular and critical acclaim. In the same year Dobbyn performed the lead single from Available Light, "Welcome Home" (2005) at the New Zealand Music Awards awards ceremony. During the performance, Ahmed Zaoui, who was appealing a security certificate issued due to alleged links to terrorist groups, appeared on stage with Dobbyn.

==== Don McGlashan ====
Composer, singer and multi-instrumentalist Don McGlashan won fame with bands Blam Blam Blam, The Front Lawn, and The Mutton Birds, before pursuing a solo career. McGlashan's first hits were with band Blam Blam Blam in the early 1980s. He later released four albums as lead singer and writer for The Mutton Birds. McGlashan's first solo album Warm Hand, was released in May 2006. It was nominated for an NZ Music Award for album of the year, and debut single Miracle Sun was a nominee for New Zealand's supreme songwriting award, the APRA Silver Scroll. He has composed extensively for cinema and television.

==== Bic Runga ====
Singer-songwriter and multi-instrumentalist pop artist Bic Runga released her first solo album Drive in 1997. It debuted at number one on the New Zealand Top 40 Album charts. Runga has since become one of the highest-selling New Zealand artists in recent history. She has also found success internationally in Australia, Ireland, and, to some extent, in the UK. In the 2006 New Year Honours Runga was appointed a Member of the New Zealand Order of Merit for services to music.

==== Lorde ====
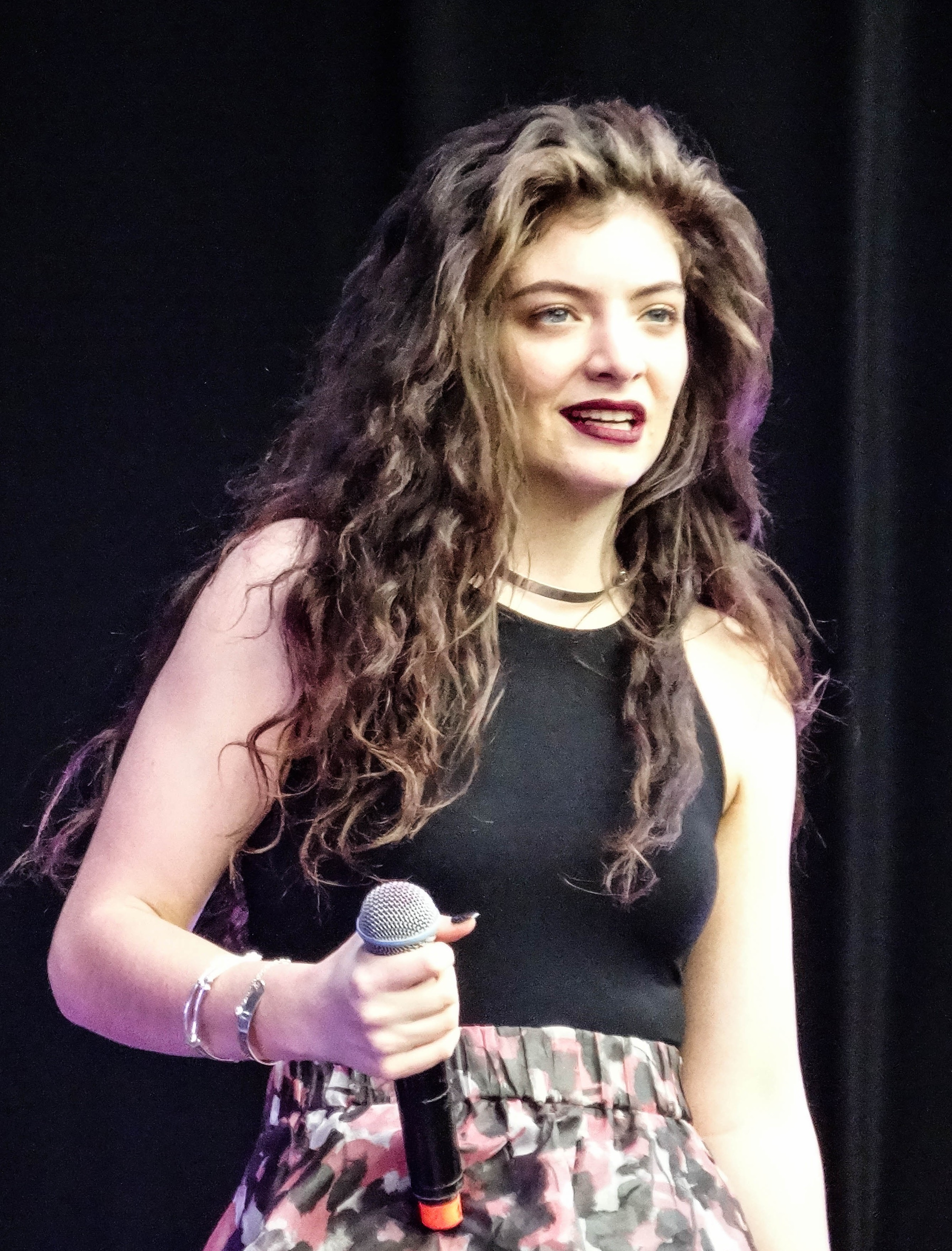
Lorde is one of the most internationally successful New Zealand artists.

In September 2013, 16-year-old singer Lorde (Ella Yelich-O'Connor) became the youngest solo artist to ever reach number one on the US singles chart with Royals. The song from her album Pure Heroine went on to win Best Pop Performance and Song of the Year at the 2014 Grammy Awards.

==== Top-selling singles and albums ====
The top-selling New Zealand pop song of all time is How Bizarre by OMC. The song went to number one in New Zealand, Australia, Canada, Ireland, South Africa and Austria. It spent 36 weeks on the United States Hot 100 Airplay (Radio Songs) charts, peaking at number 4. It reached number five in the United Kingdom, and it made the Top 10 in Portugal and Israel.

In 2008, folk parody duo Flight of the Conchords found international success with their eponymous album. The album debuted at number three on the U.S. Billboard 200 chart, selling about 52,000 copies in its first week.

In 2011, New Zealand singer Kimbra collaborated with Belgian-Australian singer Gotye on his song Somebody That I Used To Know. The song topped the US, UK, Australian and 23 other national charts, and reached the top 10 in more than 30 countries around the world. The song has sold more than 13 million copies worldwide, becoming one of the best-selling digital singles of all time.

In 2020, New Zealand singer Benee's single Supalonely went viral on video sharing app TikTok. It subsequently went to chart in the Top 40 of many major music markets, including the United States, United Kingdom, Australia, New Zealand and Canada.

=== Rock, alternative rock and indie rock ===
The first rock'n'roll hit by a New Zealander was Johnny Devlin's hit "Lawdy Miss Clawdy", which sold 100,000 copies in 1959–60, after which rock began gaining in popularity over the 1960s. Prominent bands included The La De Da's, Ray Columbus & The Invaders, and The Fourmyula.

By the late 1970s, some New Zealand rock bands were finding national success, including Th' Dudes (whose guitarist Dave Dobbyn formed DD Smash in the 1980s), Dragon, Hello Sailor and Split Enz, fronted by Tim Finn, and later, his brother Neil Finn, who went on to form Crowded House. Independent music in New Zealand began emerging in the latter half of the 1970s, with the development of a punk rock scene. In 1979, the AK79 compilation was released, compiling the recordings of many early Auckland punk groups.

Several independent labels like Propeller Records in Auckland and Flying Nun Records in Christchurch were established in the early 1980s, and became influential in the development of New Zealand rock music and indie rock globally. The Clean from Dunedin was the first major band to feature on Flying Nun, releasing several hit singles inside New Zealand and touring internationally. Most of the first wave of artists signed to the label originated from Dunedin and Christchurch, helping to develop what became called the "Dunedin sound", or Flying Nun sound. The distinctive jangle-pop and lo-fi sound was pioneered by bands such as The Chills, The Verlaines, Sneaky Feelings, The Bats and The Jean-Paul Sartre Experience.

Rock band Shihad was formed by vocalist/guitarist Jon Toogood and drummer Tom Larkin in 1988. The band found wide popularity in New Zealand over the following decade, playing a mixture of modern rock, post-grunge and pop-rock. Shihad has had three number one albums in New Zealand.

Other notable rock bands popular in the 1990s include the Headless Chickens, The Mutton Birds, The Exponents, The Feelers, Supergroove and Push Push.

=== Hip-hop ===
The first major New Zealand hip-hop hit was "Hip Hop Holiday" by 3 The Hard Way. Sampling the song Dreadlock Holiday by 10CC, it went to number one for several weeks in early 1994. Many of New Zealand's first hip-hop performers, such as Dalvanius Prime, whose "Poi E" was a number one hit, were Māori. Released in 1984, "Poi E" was sung entirely in the Māori language and featured a blend of Māori cultural practices in the song and accompanying music video, including Māori chanting, poi dancing, and the wearing of traditional Māori garments.

The first entire album of locally produced hip-hop was Upper Hutt Posse's E Tu EP, from 1988. E Tu was partially in Māori and partially in English, and its lyrics were politically charged. The song "E Tu" combined African-American revolutionary rhetoric with an explicitly Māori frame of reference. It paid homage to the rebel Māori warrior chiefs of New Zealand's colonial history: Hōne Heke, Te Kooti, and Te Rauparaha.

In the 1990s, the New Zealand hip-hop scene grew with the evolution of Pacific Island-influenced hip-hop. Phil Fuemana, Kosmo, Brother D and Pacific Underground played an important role in the growth of "Pasifika" hip-hop. OMC's 1996 single "How Bizarre" combined Pauly Fuemana's Nieuean background, a Pacific Island guitar style and hip-hop beats to create a uniquely New Zealand-Polynesian sound. This was followed by Che Fu's album 2 B s-Pacific in 1998 and Urban Pacifica in 1999, a compilation of Pasifika hip-hop. Artists including Scribe, Tiki Taane, P-Money and Ladi6 localised rap.

In 2005, Savage, a New Zealand Samoan hip-hop artist, had back-to-back number one hits with Swing and Moonshine, the latter featuring US artist Akon. Swing was used in the 2007 film Knocked Up and sold more than 1.8 million copies in the United States, making it almost double platinum. The song also appeared on the US compilation Now That's What I Call Music! 29.

=== Roots, reggae, and dub ===
Formed in 1979, Herbs are a New Zealand reggae vocal group and the 11th inductee into the New Zealand Music Hall of Fame. In 1986, the song "Slice of Heaven" with Dave Dobbyn reached number one on both the New Zealand and Australian charts. In 1989, Tim Finn joined them for the Parihaka festival and, in 1992, Annie Crummer fronted the hit single "See What Love Can Do". Herbs are considered pioneers of the Pacific reggae sound, having paved the way for contemporary New Zealand reggae groups such as Breaks Co-op, Fat Freddy's Drop, Katchafire, Kora, The Black Seeds, Salmonella Dub, 1814, Tahuna Breaks, Six60 and Trinity Roots.

=== Electronica ===
Electronic music in New Zealand constitutes a relatively small but growing trend in the country's musical culture especially with the rise of acts such as Concord Dawn, Minuit, Rhian Sheehan and Shapeshifter in the last 15 years.

An early example of New Zealand electronica is a track called Pulsing released in 1982 by The Body Electric. In 1988 Propeller Records released New Zealand's first House record, Jam This Record. Other New Zealand house DJs who rose to prominence include DLT. The Future Jazz scene (the term was first coined in Auckland in the early 1990s) developed in Auckland, most notably in the Cause Celebre nightclub and the work of Nathan Haines. Two popular early Nathan Haines releases were Freebass Live at Cause Celebre and Haines' Shift Left. A proponent of this sound and an ex-pat artist who is still active in this area is Mark de Clive-Lowe.

=== Heavy metal ===
New Zealand heavy metal bands include Devilskin, the extreme metal bands Ulcerate, Dawn of Azazel and 8 Foot Sativa and the alternative metal band Blindspott, currently known as Blacklistt. In 2016 groove metal band Alien Weaponry, several of whose songs are in the Māori language, won Smokefreerockquest and Smokefree Pacifica beats. Other bands include Antagonist A.D., Legacy of Disorder, Human, Black Boned Angel, Beastwars, Demoniac, Diocletian, In Dread Response, Saving Grace, Sinate, Push Push, Razorwyre, HLAH, and Knightshade.

The 2015 New Zealand comedy horror film Deathgasm soundtrack gave rise to various metal groups.

Shepherds Reign is a Polynesian band that play mostly heavy metal music. They released their album Ala Mai in 2023. The majority of the songs are sung in Samoan.

=== Blues ===
The history of blues in New Zealand dates from the 1960s. The earliest blues influences on New Zealand musicians originated with white British blues musicians like The Animals and The Rolling Stones, and later the blues-tinged rock of groups such as Led Zeppelin. The first American blues artist to make a big impact in New Zealand was Stevie Ray Vaughan in the early 1980s. Other blues-related genres such as soul and gospel almost completely by-passed New Zealand audiences, except for a handful of hits from cross-over artists such as Ray Charles. New Zealand does not have its own distinctive blues style.

== Folk music ==
The Wellerman sea shanty originated in New Zealand. Folk music has a long history and folk clubs existed since the 1970s.

=== Brass bands ===
The City of Auckland Pipe Band playing Amazing Grace during the festival interceltique de Lorient in 2016

New Zealand has a proud history of brass bands, with regular provincial contests. The earliest bands were garrison or religious bands but the late 19th century and early 20th century saw the growth of community brass bands, along with the construction of bandstands.

=== Highland pipe bands ===
Pipe bands became widespread during the early 20th century. New Zealand is said to have more pipebands per person than Scotland; historical links are maintained by Caledonian Societies throughout the country.

== Classical and art music ==
The formal traditions of European classical music took a long time to develop in New Zealand due to the country's geographical isolation. Composers such as Alfred Hill were educated in Europe and brought late Romantic Music traditions to New Zealand. He attempted to graft them on to New Zealand themes with one notable success, the popular "Waiata Poi". However, before 1960 New Zealand did not have a distinct classical style of its own, having "a tendency to over-criticise home-produced goods".

Douglas Lilburn, working predominantly in the third quarter of the 20th century, is often credited with being the first composer to compose with a truly New Zealand voice and gain international recognition. Lilburn's Second Piano Sonatina was described as "a work which seems to draw on the best of Lilburn's past...specially suited to New Zealand." He went on to pioneer electronic music in New Zealand.

In 2004, Wellington composer John Psathas achieved the largest audience for New Zealand-composed music when his fanfares and other music were heard by billions during the opening and closing ceremonies of the Athens 2004 Summer Olympics.

In 2019 Gareth Farr was a recipient of a New Zealand Arts Laureate Award in recognition of his music which has included composing for the Royal New Zealand Ballet, Maui One Man Against The Gods and the 2008 work Terra Incognita, for bass baritone solo, choir and orchestra, performed by Paul Whelan, the Orpheus Choir and the New Zealand Symphony Orchestra, conducted by Paul MacAlindin.

There are two twelve-month Composer-in-Residence positions available in New Zealand, the Mozart Fellowship at the University of Otago and the NZSM Composer in Residence in Wellington.

=== Orchestras and chamber music ===
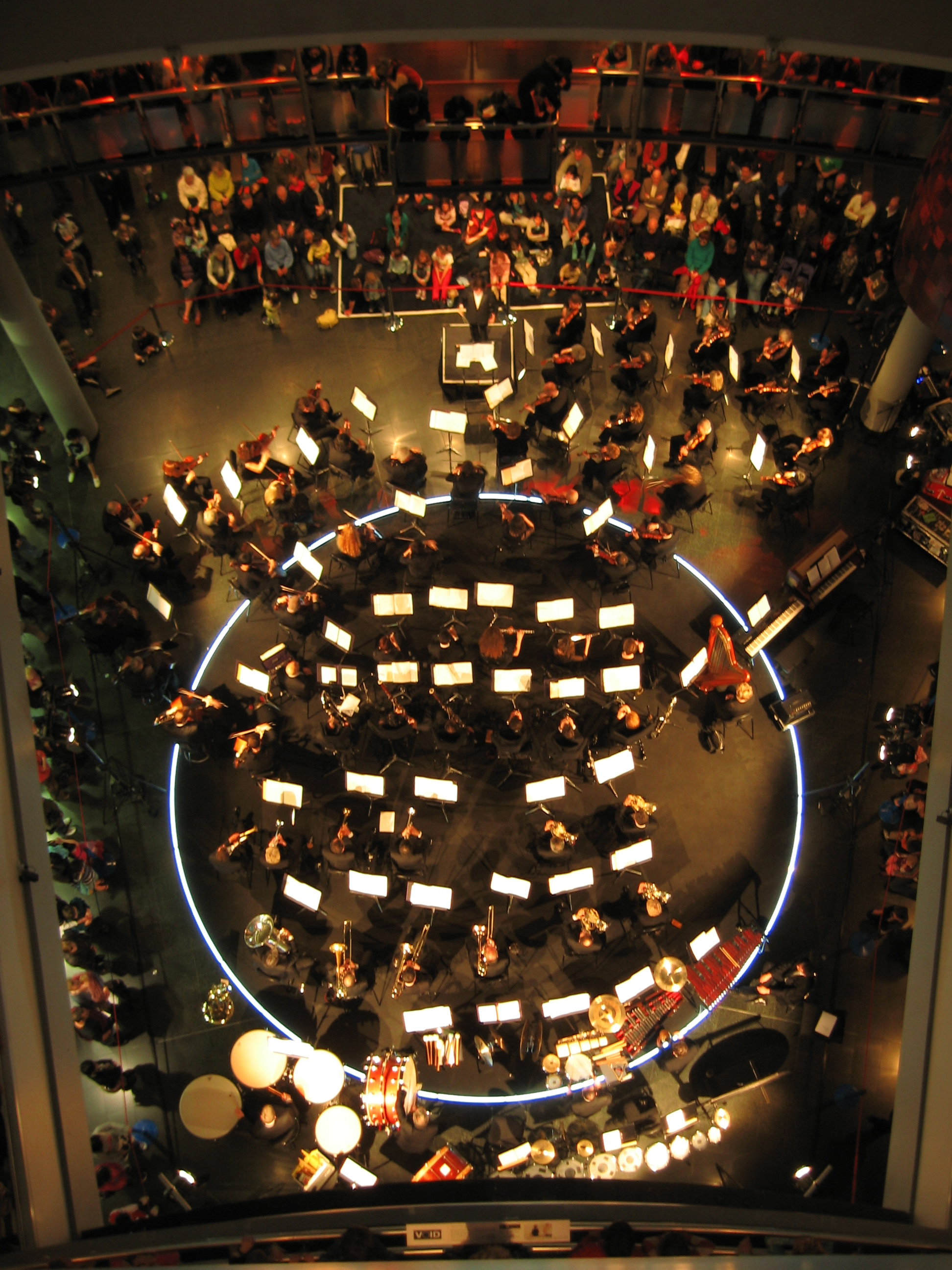
NZSO playing at Museum of New Zealand Te Papa Tongarewa

The New Zealand Symphony Orchestra (NZSO) is New Zealand's national orchestra, funded by the Ministry for Culture and Heritage. The Auckland Philharmonia Orchestra is New Zealand's second and only other full-time professional orchestra. There are also a number of semi-professional regional orchestras, presenting their own concert series each year. These include the Opus Chamber Orchestra in Hamilton, Orchestra Wellington, the Christchurch Symphony Orchestra (CSO) and the Dunedin Symphony Orchestra (DSO), formerly the Southern Sinfonia.

The New Zealand String Quartet and the NZTrio both perform locally and internationally. The NZTrio specialises in contemporary art music.

=== Choirs ===
New Zealand has a strong choral tradition. The Anglican cathedrals in Auckland, Wellington and Christchurch have choirs of a high standard and there are also a number of secular New Zealand choirs including the New Zealand Youth Choir, Voices New Zealand Chamber Choir, City Choir Dunedin, Auckland Choral Society and Christchurch City Choir. Many of these choirs perform around New Zealand and compete against other choirs internationally.

=== Opera ===
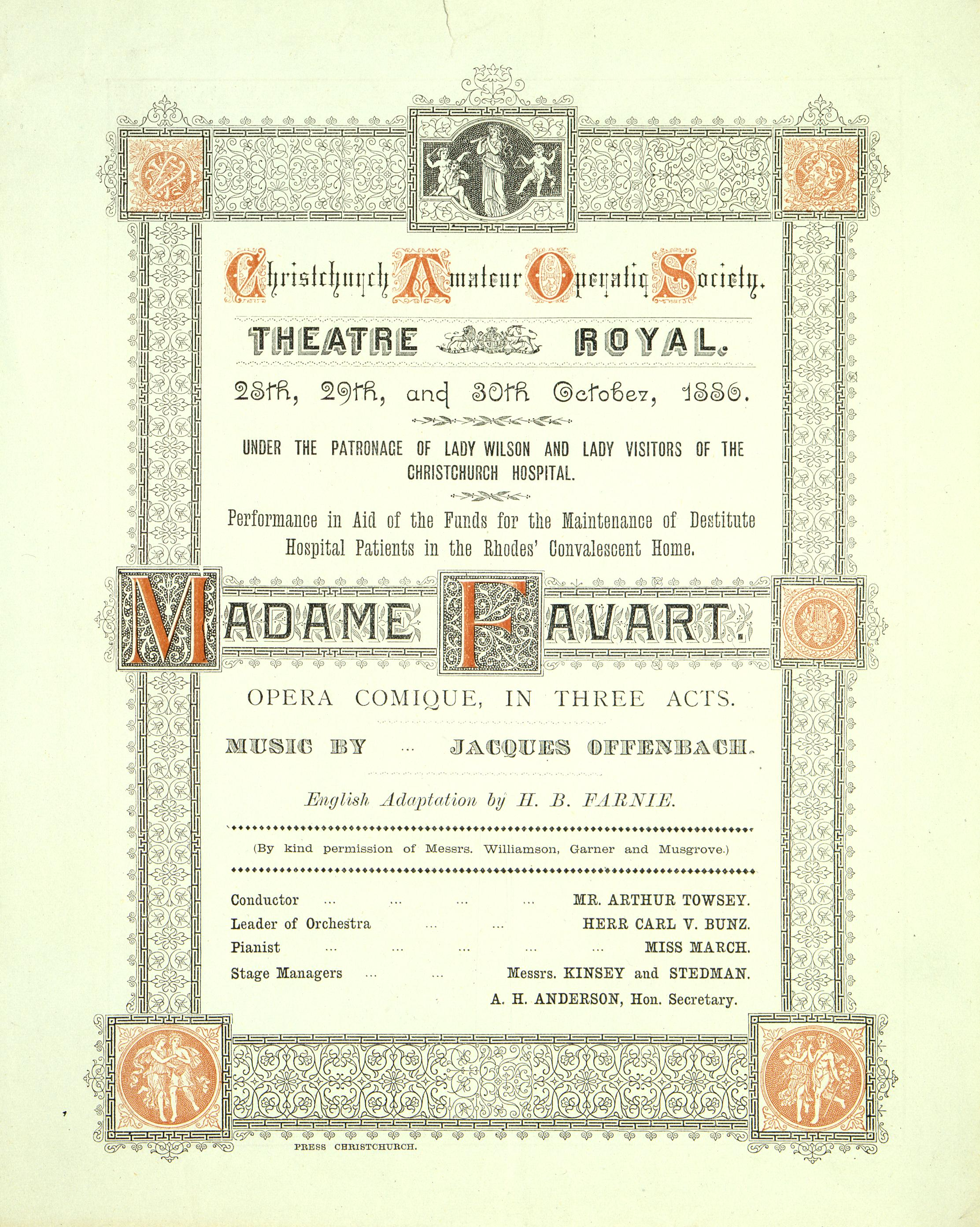
Christchurch Amateur Operatic Society -Theatre Royal (1886), programme for Madame Favart with music by Jacques Offenbach

Opera has been produced in New Zealand since colonisation. New Zealand has produced a number of internationally famous opera singers, including Dame Kiri Te Kanawa, Sir Donald McIntyre, Simon O'Neill, Jonathan Lemalu, Teddy Tahu Rhodes, Anna Leese, and Dame Malvina Major. Frances Alda and Joan Hammond were both well-known New Zealand-born opera singers.

There is a biennial competition the Lexus Song Quest, winners include Dame Malvina Major, Dame Kiri Te Kanawa, Phillip Rhodes, Jonathan Lemalu and Amitai Pati.

New Zealand Opera is the country's sole professional opera company. The company stages up to three operas a year in Auckland, Wellington and Christchurch, and features international as well as New Zealand soloists.

=== Soloists ===
Prominent New Zealand musicians performing internationally include pianists Michael Houstoun, Jeffrey Grice, John Chen, and singer Hayley Westenra.

== Musical theatre ==
The most well-known musical theatre production written by a New Zealander is The Rocky Horror Show, written by Richard O'Brien, and first performed on stage in London during 1973.

== See also ==
- AudioCulture, a New Zealand On Air funded online project billed as the "Noisy Library of New Zealand Music"
- New Zealand music festivals
- Aotearoa Music Awards
- Nature's Best, a two-disc compilation album of thirty New Zealand popular music songs
- List of bands from New Zealand
- List of Māori composers
- Performing arts in New Zealand
