= Long Ago =

Long Ago may refer to:

- "Long Ago", song from the musical Half a Sixpence
- "Long Ago", song by Mariah Carey from the album Daydream
- "Long Ago", song by Hawk Nelson from the album Crazy Love
- "Long Ago", song by Status Quo from the album Never Too Late
- "Long Ago (and Far Away)", a song by Jerome Kern and Ira Gershwin from the 1944 film musical Cover Girl
- Long Ago, studio album by Herbs
