= Sensitive to a Smile =

Sensitive to a Smile may refer to:

- "Sensitive to a Smile" (song), a 1987 song by Herbs
- Sensitive to a Smile (album), a 1987 album by Herbs
