= French Letter =

French Letter or French letter may refer to:

- French letter or condom, a birth control device
- "French Letter", a song by the New Zealand band Herbs
- Les Lettres Françaises (French for "The French Letters"), a French literary publication

== See also ==
- French orthography, the spelling and punctuation of the French language
