= 1986 in New Zealand =

- Decades: 1960s; 1970s; 1980s; 1990s; 2000s
- See also: History of New Zealand; List of years in New Zealand; Timeline of New Zealand history

The following lists events that happened during 1986 in New Zealand.

== Population ==
- Estimated population as of 31 December: 3,313,500.
- Increase since 31 December 1985: 10,400 (0.31%).
- Males per 100 Females: 97.9.

== Incumbents ==
=== Regal and viceregal ===
- Head of State – Elizabeth II
- Governor-General – The Rt Revd. Sir Paul Reeves GCMG GCVO QSO

=== Government ===
The 41st New Zealand Parliament continued. The fourth Labour Party government was in power.

- Speaker of the House – Gerard Wall
- Prime Minister – David Lange
- Deputy Prime Minister – Geoffrey Palmer
- Minister of Finance – Roger Douglas
- Minister of Foreign Affairs – David Lange
- Chief Justice – Sir Ronald Davison

=== Parliamentary opposition ===
- Leader of the Opposition – Jim McLay (National) until 26 March, then Jim Bolger (National).

=== Main centre leaders ===
- Mayor of Auckland – Catherine Tizard
- Mayor of Hamilton – Ross Jansen
- Mayor of Wellington – Ian Lawrence then Jim Belich
- Mayor of Christchurch – Hamish Hay
- Mayor of Dunedin – Cliff Skeggs

== Events ==
- 16 February – Soviet cruise ship Mikhail Lermontov sinks in the Marlborough Sounds.
- 22 February–2 March – The Queen and the Duke of Edinburgh visit New Zealand.
- 26 March – Jim Bolger replaces Jim McLay as leader of the National Party.
- 11 April – The Plaza Shopping Centre in Palmerston North, then known as the PDC Plaza, is officially opened by Prime Minister David Lange.
- 21 June – The Wanganui Herald publishes its last issue. The paper started in 1865 as The Evening Herald.
- July – The national speed limit is increased from 80km/h to 100km/h.
- 9 July – Parliament passes the Homosexual Law Reform Bill, 49 votes to 44; the law comes into effect on 8 August.
- October – The Quota Management System is introduced.
- 1 October – GST is introduced at a rate of 10%.
- 22 November – Pope John Paul II visits New Zealand for two days.
- December – The Royal Commission on the Electoral System produces a report recommending the adoption of a mixed member proportional electoral system.
- 13 December – The Constitution Act is passed, ending the right of the British Parliament to pass laws on behalf of New Zealand.
- 16 December – Māori loan affair raised by Winston Peters in Parliament.

== Arts and literature ==
- Cilla McQueen wins the Robert Burns Fellowship.

See 1986 in art, 1986 in literature, Category:1986 books

=== Music ===
==== New Zealand Music Awards ====
Winners are shown first with nominees underneath.

- ALBUM OF THE YEAR Peking Man – Peking Man
  - The Verlaines – Halleujah
  - Patsy Riggir – Patsy Riggir Country
- SINGLE OF THE YEAR Peking Man – "Room That Echoes"
  - Ardijah – Give Me Your Number
  - Patea Maori Club featuring Dalvanius – E Papa
- BEST MALE VOCALIST Pat Urlich
  - Malcolm McNeill
  - Sonny Day
- BEST FEMALE VOCALIST Margaret Urlich
  - Betty Monga
  - Annie Crummer
- BEST GROUP Peking Man
  - The Patea Maori Group
  - Satellite Spies
- MOST PROMISING MALE VOCALIST Tex Pistol
  - Simon Alexandra
  - Lyonel Grant
- MOST PROMISING FEMALE VOCALIST Tania Rowles
  - Ainsley Day
  - Liz Diamond
- MOST PROMISING GROUP Ardijah
  - Chrome Safari
  - Wentworth Brewster & Co
- INTERNATIONAL ACHIEVEMENT Herbs
  - The Chills
  - Michael Roy Croft
- BEST VIDEO Kerry Brown – As The Sun Goes Down (Everything that Flies)
  - Stuart Dryborough – Good Luck To You
  - Fetus Productions/MEC – Flicker
- BEST PRODUCER Bruce Lynch – Peking Man
  - Ryan Monga/ Dave McArtney/ Trevor Reekie – Give Me Your Number (Ardijah)
  - Glyn Tucker – I Wish I'd Asked – (Satellite Spies)
- BEST ENGINEER Graeme Myhre – Peking Man
  - Ian Morris – Ballad of Buskin Bob
  - Paul Streekstra/Graham Myhre – Give Me Your Number
  - Graham Myhre – Drive Baby Drive
- BEST JAZZ ALBUM Phil Broadhurst Trio–Iris
  - John Niland – Inside
  - Alan Broadbent Trio – Further Down The Road
- BEST CLASSICAL ALBUM NZ Symphony Orchestra – A Song of Islands
  - Besser & Prosser – Dark Wind/Spring Rain
  - Eugene & Nicolai Albulescu – Rhapsody
  - Mina Foley / Michael Gifford – Mina Foley / Michael Gifford
- BEST COUNTRY ALBUM Patsy Riggir – Patsy Riggir Country
  - Suzanne Prentice – In Concert
  - Michael Roy Croft – Slow Burnin'
- BEST FOLK ALBUM Various Artists – Send The Boats Away
  - Chris and Lyn Thompson – Together
  - Boys of Spirit NZ Trust – Sea Shanties
- BEST GOSPEL ALBUM Samoan Congregational Christian Church Choir – Matou Te Fia Sauna
  - Paul and Colleen Trenwith and Friends – Brand New Day
  - Ray Watson – Asaph -Throne of Love
- BEST POLYNESIAN ALBUM The Five Stars – Flower of Samoa
  - O Savali A Keriso – E Le Mavae Le Alofa
  - Mahia Blackmore – Little Tui
- BEST SONG OF THE YEAR Dave Dobbyn – Slice of Heaven
  - Ryan Monga – Give Me Your Number
  - Dance Exponents – Caroline Skies
- BEST COVER Phil O'Reilly – Peking Man
  - Ngila Dickson – As the Sun Goes Down
  - Paula & Graham Reid – This Sporting Life

See: 1986 in music

=== Performing arts ===
- Benny Award presented by the Variety Artists Club of New Zealand to Johnny Bond.

=== Radio and television ===
- 16 February – Radio U switches to broadcasting on FM, becoming the first FM radio station in Christchurch.
- 31 May – Christchurch's 3ZM switches to broadcasting on FM.
- The State Owned Enterprises Act requires all State-owned enterprises, including Television New Zealand, to operate as commercially successful businesses.

See: 1986 in New Zealand television, 1986 in television, List of TVNZ television programming, Category:Television in New Zealand, TV3 (New Zealand), Category:New Zealand television shows, Public broadcasting in New Zealand

=== Film ===
- Mark II
- Pallet on the Floor
- Queen City Rocker

See: Category:1986 film awards, 1986 in film, List of New Zealand feature films, Cinema of New Zealand, Category:1986 films

== Sport ==
=== Athletics ===
- John Campbell wins his second national title in the men's marathon, clocking 2:15:19 on 1 June in Christchurch, while Sharon Higgins claims her first in the women's championship (2:45:44).

=== Commonwealth Games ===
| Gold | Silver | Bronze | Total |
|---|---|---|---|
| 8 | 16 | 14 | 38 |

=== Cricket ===
- New Zealand achieve historic test series wins over Australia and England.

Their 1–0 victory over Alan Border's Australians in February/March 1986 was their first series win over Australia at home with a 5 wicket win in the third test at Eden Park. This followed on from their 2-1 series win in Australia in November/December 1985, where Richard Hadlee took a record 33 wickets in three tests.

In June/July 1986 New Zealand achieved their first test series win in England, 1-0, winning the second test at Trent Bridge.

=== Horse racing ===
==== Harness racing ====
- New Zealand Trotting Cup: Master Mood
- Auckland Trotting Cup: Comedy Lad

=== Shooting ===
- Ballinger Belt –
  - Mark Buchanan (Australia)
  - Chester Burt (Ashhurst), second, top New Zealander

=== Soccer ===
- The Chatham Cup is won by North Shore United who beat Mount Maunganui 4–2 on aggregate in the two-legged final.

== Births ==
- 2 January: Nathan Cohen, rower, Olympic gold medallist (2012 London)
- 15 January: Isaia Toeava, rugby player.
- 29 January: Steven Broad, singer.
- 31 January: Olli Harder, association football coach and former player
- 13 February: Hamish Bond, rower, Olympic gold medallist (2012 London)
- 17 February: Steven Old, soccer player.
- 4 March: Manu Vatuvei, rugby league player.
- 5 March: Sean Eathorne, cricketer.
- 17 March (in South Africa): Corney Swanepoel, swimmer.
- 4 April: Richard Petherick, field hockey player.
- 20 April: Cameron Duncan, director and screenwriter (d. 2003)
- 21 April (in Australia): Ryan Kersten, basketballer.
- 5 May: Cole Tinkler, soccer player.
- 6 May: Tanerau Latimer, rugby player
- 15 May: Jo Aleh, sailor, Olympic gold medallist (2012 London)
- 4 September: Michael Murphy, singer.
- 16 September: Willie Lonsdale, cricketer.
- 24 September: Todd Astle, cricketer.
- 30 September: Martin Guptill, cricketer.
- 7 October: Amy Satterthwaite, cricketer.
- 14 October: Teresa Bergman, singer.

Category:1986 births

== Deaths ==
- 25 January: Dennis Smith, cricketer. (born 1913)
- 24 April: Garnet Mackley, businessman and politician. (born 1883)
- 16 May: Joe Bootham, painter. (born 1911)
- 19 May: Leonard Trent, RNZAF pilot and Victoria Cross winner. (born 1915)
- 27 June: George Nēpia, rugby player. (born 1905)
- 10 August: Don McRae, cricketer and soccer player. (born 1914)
- 11 August: Peter Mahon, Queen's Counsel, judge. (born 1923)
- 25 September: Geoff Alley, rugby player, National Librarian. (born 1903)
- 16 October: Harold Beamish, World War I flying ace. (born 1896)

== See also ==
- History of New Zealand
- List of years in New Zealand
- Military history of New Zealand
- Timeline of New Zealand history
- Timeline of New Zealand's links with Antarctica
- Timeline of the New Zealand environment
