= 1987 in New Zealand =

- Decades: 1960s; 1970s; 1980s; 1990s; 2000s
- See also: History of New Zealand; List of years in New Zealand; Timeline of New Zealand history

The following lists events that happened during 1987 in New Zealand.

== Population ==
- Estimated population as of 31 December: 3,342,100.
- Increase since 31 December 1986: 28,600 (0.86%).
- Males per 100 Females: 97.9.

== Incumbents ==
=== Regal and viceregal ===
- Head of State – Elizabeth II
- Governor-General – The Rt Revd. Sir Paul Reeves GCMG GCVO QSO

=== Government ===
The 41st New Zealand Parliament, led by the Labour Party, concluded, and in the general election the party was re-elected in the 42nd New Zealand Parliament. The election also saw the elimination of the Democratic Party (formerly known as the Social Credit Party) from Parliament, leaving Labour and National as the only parties with representation.

- Speaker of the House – Gerard Wall then Kerry Burke
- Prime Minister – David Lange
- Deputy Prime Minister – Geoffrey Palmer
- Minister of Finance – Roger Douglas
- Minister of Foreign Affairs – David Lange then Russell Marshall
- Chief Justice — Sir Ronald Davison

=== Parliamentary opposition ===
- Leader of the Opposition – Jim Bolger (National).

=== Main centre leaders ===
- Mayor of Auckland – Catherine Tizard
- Mayor of Hamilton – Ross Jansen
- Mayor of Wellington – Jim Belich
- Mayor of Christchurch – Hamish Hay
- Mayor of Dunedin – Cliff Skeggs

== Events ==
- 1 January – Unleaded petrol is introduced, with unleaded 91-octane fuel replacing "regular" 91-octane leaded fuel. "Super" 96-octane remains leaded.
- January, February – Māori loan affair continues.
- 17 February – A bus on a field trip from Woodford House school in Havelock North rolls down a bank near Kereru, 50 km (31 mi) west of Hastings. Five people (two students, two teachers and the bus driver) are killed and at least 17 are injured.
- 2 March – Edgecumbe earthquake in the Bay of Plenty.
- 19 May – Air New Zealand Flight 24, en route from Tokyo to Auckland, is hijacked at Nadi International Airport, Fiji while on a scheduled refuelling stop.
- 22 May–20 June – Inaugural Rugby World Cup hosted by both New Zealand and Australia, and won by New Zealand.
- June – The New Zealand Nuclear Free Zone, Disarmament, and Arms Control Act is passed.
- 19 June – Six-year-old Teresa Cormack goes missing in Napier. Her body is found eight days later.
- July – The Māori Language Act makes Māori an official language.
- 1 August – The first Lotto draw takes place.
- 15 August – The 1987 general election is held.
- August – Telecom launches New Zealand's first mobile phone network.
- 20 October – The New Zealand stock market crashes following Black Monday on Wall Street. Share prices fell by 59 percent over four months.
- 3 November – McDonald's opens its first restaurants in the South Island at Linwood and Merivale, Christchurch.
- December – New Zealand's first heart transplant takes place at Green Lane Hospital, for Brian Lindsay.

== Arts and literature ==
- Robert Lord wins the Robert Burns Fellowship.

See 1987 in art, 1987 in literature, Category:1987 books

=== Music ===
==== New Zealand Music Awards ====
Winners are shown first with nominees underneath.

- ALBUM OF THE YEAR Herbs – Sensitive to a Smile
  - Dave Dobbyn – Footrot Flats
  - Ardijah – Ardijah
- SINGLE OF THE YEAR Dave Dobbyn – You Oughta Be in Love
  - Shona Laing – Glad I'm Not A Kennedy
  - The Chills – Leather Jacket
- BEST MALE VOCALIST Dave Dobbyn
  - Charles Tumahai (Herbs)
  - Martin Phillips (The Chills)
- BEST FEMALE VOCALIST Shona Laing
  - Betty-Anne Monga (Ardijah)
  - Patsy Riggir
- BEST GROUP The Chills
  - Ardijah
  - Herbs
- MOST PROMISING MALE VOCALIST Al Hunter
  - Wayne Elliot (Knightshade)
  - David Parker (Rhythm Cage)
- MOST PROMISING FEMALE VOCALIST Moana Maniapoto Jackson Moana and the Moahunters
  - Darlene Adair
  - Kara Pewhairangi
- MOST PROMISING GROUP Bonga And Harwood
  - Rhythm Cage
  - Knightshade
- INTERNATIONAL ACHIEVEMENT Neil Finn
  - Dave Dobbyn
  - The Chills
  - Shona Laing
  - Kiri Te Kanawa
- BEST VIDEO Matt Box Films – Sensitive to a Smile (Herbs)
  - Kerry Brown/ Bruce Sheridan – Glad Im Not A Kennedy (Shona Laing)
  - Paul Middleditch – The Game of Love (Tex Pistol)
- BEST FILM SOUNDTRACK Dave Dobbyn – Footrot Flats
  - Various Artists – Queen City Rocker
- BEST PRODUCER Dave Dobbyn – Footrot Flats
  - Billy Kristian – Sensitive to a Smile (Herbs)
  - Ian Morris – The Game of Love (Tex Pistol)
- BEST ENGINEER Ian Morris – The Game of Love (Tex Pistol)
  - Roland Morris / Nick Morgan – Ardijah
  - Doug Rogers / Rhys Moody – Brand New Doll
  - Tim Field – Out for the Count
- BEST JAZZ ALBUM Mike Nock / Frank Gibson, Jr. – 'Open Door'
  - Brian Smith – Brian Smith
  - The Umbrellas – The Umbrellas
- BEST CLASSICAL ALBUM Gillian Weir – Music to the Sun King
  - NZ Symphony Orchestra – Music By Douglas Lilburn
  - Margaret Neilson – Sea Changes
- BEST COUNTRY ALBUM Al Hunter – Neon Cowboy
  - Jodi Vaughan – Straight From The Heart
  - Patsy Riggir – Close To Thee
- BEST FOLK ALBUM Beverly Young – Bushes & Briar
  - Phil Garland – Hunger in the Air
  - Paul Mesters – Pacific Pilgrim
- BEST GOSPEL ALBUM Jules Riding – Heart Strings
  - Patsy Riggir – Close To Thee
  - Darlene Adair – Darlene Adair
- BEST POLYNESIAN ALBUM Herbs – E Papa – Jah Knows
  - Kahurangi – Kahurangi
  - Moana – Kua Makona
- BEST CAST ALBUM Stewart Macpherson – Pirates of Penzance
  - Philip Norman – Love Off The Shelf
  - Thomas Baker – The Conductor's Shoes
- BEST SONGWRITER Charles Tumahai/ Dilworth Karaka – Sensitive to a Smile (Herbs)
  - Dave Dobbyn – You Oughta Be in Love
  - Shona Laing – Glad Im Not A Kennedy
- BEST COVER Philip Trusttum – Songdance (Mike Herron)
  - Peter Bennett – Elephunkin
  - Reston Griffiths – Footrot Flats

See: 1987 in music

=== Performing arts ===
- Benny Award presented by the Variety Artists Club of New Zealand to Silvio De Pra.

=== Radio and television ===
See: 1987 in New Zealand television, 1987 in television, List of TVNZ television programming, Category:Television in New Zealand, TV3 (New Zealand), Category:New Zealand television shows, Public broadcasting in New Zealand

- Auckland Radio 1ZB becomes Newstalk 1ZB creating the first Newstalk ZB station.
- 1ZM Auckland becomes Classic Hits 1251 creating the first Classic Hits station, other New Zealand radio stations do not take the Classic Hits branding until 1993/94.

1987 Listener Gofta Awards - Television

- Best performance, female, dramatic role: Jennifer Ward-Lealand, Danny and Raewyn
- Best performance, male, dramatic role: Mitchell Manuel, Mark II
- Best entertainer: Topp Twins
- Best presenter: Gordon Mclauchlan, Weekend
- Best drama series: The Fire-Raiser
- Best factual series: Weekend
- Best entertainment programme Topp Twins Special
- Best director: Peter Sharp, The Fire-Raiser
- Best live coverage: Benson and Hedges Fashion Awards
- Best original music: Topp Twins, Topp Twins Special
- Best Children's programme: episode One The Fire-Raiser
- Best single drama programme: Mark II
- Best documentary promme: Wild South - Swan Lake
- Best writer, drama: Maurice Gee, The Fire-Raiser (episode - "The Red Balaclava").
- Best writer, non-drama: Greg Stitt and Peter Hawes, Goldie: A Good Joke

==== Programme debuts ====
- 1 January – An Audience with Billy Connolly (Network 2)
- 9 February – The Adventures of Portland Bill (TV One)
- 9 February – Orm and Cheep (Network 2)
- 9 February – The Littles (Network 2)
- 9 February – C.A.B. (Network 2)
- 10 February – Dodger, Bonzo and the Rest (Network 2)
- 12 February – Alvin and the Chipmunks (Network 2)
- 12 February – Codename Icarus (Network 2)
- 13 February – T-Bag (Network 2)
- 13 February – The Henderson Kids (Network 2)
- 23 February – Alphabet Zoo (Network 2)
- 28 February – Blott on the Landscape (TV One)
- 20 April – Thomas the Tank Engine and Friends (Network 2).
- 4 May – Pole Position (Network 2)
- 12 May – Emu's World (Network 2)
- 12 May – The All Electric Amusement Arcade (Network 2)
- 20 May – Paw Paws (Network 2)
- 30 June – The Children of Green Knowe (Network 2)
- 3 July – Rainbow Brite (Network 2)
- 20 July – Heggerty Haggerty (TV One)
- 20 July – Galloping Galaxies! (Network 2)
- 20 July – The Tracey Ullman Show (Network 2)
- 24 July – Puddle Lane (Network 2)
- 24 July – The Telebugs (Network 2)
- 24 July – Monchhichis (Network 2)
- 24 July – Benji, Zax & the Alien Prince (Network 2)
- 1 August – Lotto (Network 2)
- 4 October – The Raccoons (TV One)
- 23 October – The Adventures of Spot (Network 2)
- 23 October – Pound Puppies (Network 2)
- 23 October – Brat Farrar (TV One)
- 24 October – Little Miss (TV One)
- 24 October – Mike, Mop and the Moke (TV One)
- 24 October – The Adventures of Teddy Ruxpin (TV One)
- 16 December – Slinger's Day (Network 2)

=== Film ===
1987 Listener Gofta Awards - Film

- Best performance, female, in a leading role: Judy McIntosh, Arriving Tuesday
- Best performance, male, in a leading role: Bruno Lawrence, The Quiet Earth
- Best film: The Quiet Earth
- Best director: Geoff Murphy, The Quiet Earth
- Best original screenplay: Murray Ball and Tom Scott, Footrot Flats
- Best film score: Dave Dobbyn, Footrot Flats
- Best Cinematography: Bartle, The Quiet Earth
- Best editing: Michael Horton, The Quiet Earth
- Best production design: Jo Ford, The Quiet Earth
- Best Short film: Tandem
- Best Performance, female, in a supporting role: Heather Bolton, Arriving Tuesday
- Best performance, male, ina supporting role: Peter Smith, The Quiet Earth
- Best contribution to sound track: John McKay. Footrot Flats (sound design).
- Best screenplay adaptation: Bill Baer, Sam Pillsbury and Bruno Lawrence, The Quiet Earth
- Best commercial: Travelling On (Europa).
- Rudall Hayward Award: John O'Shea

Releases

- Bad Taste
- Ngati
- Starlight Hotel

See: Category:1987 film awards, 1987 in film, List of New Zealand feature films, Cinema of New Zealand, Category:1987 films

== Sport ==
=== Rugby ===
- The All Blacks win the inaugural Rugby World Cup.

=== Athletics ===
- Peter Renner wins his first national title in the men's marathon, clocking 2:15:32 on 22 November in Wiri, while Jillian Costley claims her first in the women's championship (2:39:33).

==== Harness racing ====
- New Zealand Trotting Cup: Lightning Blue
- The Auckland Trotting Cup was run twice in 1987 as it was being rescheduled from January back to December.
  - January (2700m): Master Mood
  - December (3200m): Luxury Liner

=== Shooting ===
- Ballinger Belt – Diane Collings (Te Puke)

=== Soccer ===
- The Chatham Cup is won by Gisborne City who beat Christchurch United 7–3 on aggregate in a two-leg final.

== Births ==
- 7 January: Michael McGlinchey, football player
- 27 January: Ben Te'o, rugby league player
- 28 January: Steven O'Dor, football player
- 13 February: Frank-Paul Nu'uausala, rugby league player
- 18 February: Maria Tutaia, netball player
- 22 February: Lesley Cantwell, race walker
- 3 March: Jacob Spoonley, football player
- 17 March: Krisnan Inu, rugby league player
- 18 March: Clarissa Eshuis, hockey player
- 20 March: David Richardson, actor
- 27 March: Victor Vito, rugby union player
- 7 April: Jaimee Kaire-Gataulu, actor
- 10 April: Hayley Westenra, soprano
- 11 April: Joseph Sullivan, rower Olympic gold medallist (2012 Summer Olympics 2012 London)
- 29 April: Tim Winitana, rugby league player
- 6 May: Katrina Grant, netball player
- 29 May: Issac Luke, rugby league player
- 7 June: Daniel Logan, actor
- 8 June: Joshua Brodie, cricketer
- 4 July: Chris James, football player
- 8 July: Alana Barber, race walker
- 22 July: Sam Bewley, racing cyclist
- 1 September: Dann Hume, singer-songwriter, drummer, and producer
- 16 September: Rongo Brightwell, singer
- 2 October: Anita Punt, hockey player
- 7 October: Jeremy Brockie, football player
- 10 October: Colin Slade, rugby union player
- 30 November: Miguel Start, rugby league player
- 9 December: Polly Powrie, sailor, Olympic gold medallist (2012 Summer Olympics 2012 London)
- 14 December: Lauren Boyle, swimmer
- 23 December: Owen Franks, rugby union player All Black (2009–)

Category:1987 births.

== Deaths ==
- 16 January Colin Scrimgeour, minister and broadcaster.
- 13 February: Curly Page, cricketer.
- 29 May: Bryan Todd, businessman (born 1902)
- 31 May: Wilfrid Mervyn Lusty, journalist, drama critic, theatre administrator and adult educationalist
- 16 July: Harry Ayres, guide and mountaineer.
- 4 August: Cecil Burke, cricketer.
- 14 October: John Rangihau, academic and leader of Tuhoe iwi.
- 27 December: Rewi Alley, writer and member of the Chinese Communist Party.
- Alfred E. Allen, politician.
- Johnnie Hoskins, motorcycle speedway pioneer.
- Norman Jones, politician.
- Colin McCahon, artist.
- Denis Rogers, mayor of Hamilton.

== See also ==
- List of years in New Zealand
- Timeline of New Zealand history
- History of New Zealand
- Military history of New Zealand
- Timeline of the New Zealand environment
- Timeline of New Zealand's links with Antarctica
