= See What Love Can Do =

Song by English musician Eric Clapton

Single by Eric Clapton

from the album Behind the Sun
- B-side: "She's Waiting"
- Released: 1985
- Length: 3:59
- Label: Warner Bros.
- Songwriter: Jerry Lynn Williams
- Producers: Ted Templeman; Lenny Waronker

Eric Clapton singles chronology
"Forever Man" (1985)	"See What Love Can Do" (1985)	"She's Waiting" (1985)

"See What Love Can Do" is a song by English rock musician Eric Clapton, released through Warner Bros. Records in 1985 as the second single from his ninth solo studio album, Behind the Sun (1985). Written by American rock musician Jerry Lynn Williams, a frequent collaborator of Clapton's during the 1980s, the track reached the top 20 of the Billboard Top Rock Tracks chart.

== Recording ==
Clapton came to record "See What Love Can Do" after Warner Bros. rejected his original tapes for Behind the Sun as not having enough songs with single potential. Clapton challenged them to find material for him that they considered strong enough and they sent three songs by Williams, "See What Love Can Do", "Forever Man" and "Something's Happening".

The lyrics basically state that the world would be happy if everyone got along.

== Reception ==
Cash Box said that "See What Love Can Do" "plays off a reggae/ gospel theme...and provides an excellent showcase for some tasteful guitar playing." Cash Box also praised the "tight background vocals and rhythm section." The Age critic Mike Daly described "See What Love Can Do" as a "warm, easy-paced ballad with an elegant electric solo from Clapton." Message-Inquirer critic Gary Karr said that it "moves along so lazily that it fails to stir any kind of emotion or identification with the singer." Commercial Appeal critic Brown Burnett described it as "Latin-flavored".

Eric Clapton FAQ author David Bowling called it a "solid rock track" and a song that "had commercial appeal while providing a foundation for Clapton's guitar playing." Clapton biographer Marc Roberty called it "a fine song which is heightened by Eric's exemplary solo." Music writer Andrew Wild called it "a pleasant but faceless song" but praised the short, fluid "exemplary guitar solo."

== Single release ==
"See What Love Can Do" was the second single released from Behind the Sun, after the hit "Forever Man". The b-side, "She's Waiting", was also released as a single in its own right. "She's Waiting" reached #11 on the Billboard Top Rock Tracks chart, but did not chart on the Billboard Hot 100. "She's Waiting" also reached #27 on the Cash Box Top 30 Music Videos chart. Daly said that "She's Waiting" is "heavy on slow-throbbing drum power, with guitar and synthesizers combining with the urgent harmony vocals." Burnett called it "an interesting and powerful number that stalks the listener rather than propels him" but Karr said that it "tires extremely quickly".

== Charts ==
Chart (1985)	Peak position
US Billboard Hot 100	89
US Mainstream Rock (Billboard)	20

== Annie Crummer and Herbs version ==
"See What Love Can Do"

Single by Annie Crummer featuring Herbs

from the album Language
- B-side: "Make Up"
- Released: 1992
- Studio: "Home" (Note: A probable reference to Crummer's father's homeland of the Cook Islands, where Language was partially recorded.); Mandrill (Auckland); Marmalade (Wellington)
- Length: 4:35
- Label: East West
- Songwriter: Jerry Lynn Williams
- Producers: Nigel Stone; Annie Crummer

Annie Crummer singles chronology
"Once or Twice" (1982)	"See What Love Can Do" (1992)	"Language" (1992)

New Zealand singer Annie Crummer recorded a cover of "See What Love Can Do", featuring the New Zealand reggae group Herbs, as the lead single from her debut studio album, Language (1992). Released in 1992 through East West Records, it peaked at No. 3 on the New Zealand singles chart and became the country's 24th best-selling song of 1992.

=== Background and release ===
Although Crummer had been active in the New Zealand music industry for some time prior to the release of "See What Love Can Do", including through providing guest vocals on the Netherworld Dancing Toys "Kiwi classic" hit "For Today" and performing as a member of the girl group When the Cat's Away, the track marked a pivotal point in her career as it initiated the rollout for her first solo album. Its release was promoted with a monochrome music video directed by Fred Renata.

=== Reception and accolades ===
Donna Yuzwalk positively reviewed "See What Love Can Do" in the September 1992 issue of Rip It Up, contrasting its "restrained, elegant manner" with Crummer's previous involvement in When the Cat's Away. Peter Thomson also positively highlighted the track in his review of Language in the January 1993 issue of the same publication. At the 1993 New Zealand Music Awards, the song was nominated for Single of the Year, Best Producer (Crummer and Nigel Stone), and Best Engineer (Stone). It won the latter two awards but lost the former to "Nature" by The Mutton Birds.

=== Personnel ===
Credits adapted from the liner notes of "See What Love Can Do".

- Annie Crummer – lead vocals, backing vocals, production
- Barbara Griffin – piano
- Herbs – lead vocals, backing vocals
  - Charlie Tumahai – duet vocals
- Nigel Stone – programming, production, engineering, mixing
- Lance Su'a – guitar
- Rob Winch – bass guitar, guitar, percussion

=== Charts ===
==== Weekly charts ====
Chart (1992)	Peak position
New Zealand (Recorded Music NZ)	3

==== Year-end charts ====
Chart (1992)	Position
New Zealand (Recorded Music NZ)	24

== Certifications ==
Region	Certification	Certified units/sales
New Zealand (RMNZ)	Gold	15,000^{‡}
^{‡} Sales+streaming figures based on certification alone.
