= You Oughta Be In Love =

Single by Dave Dobbyn featuring Ardijah

from the album Footrot Flats: The Dog's ~~Tail~~ Tale soundtrack
- B-side: "Horse's Beat"
- Released: 21 December 1986 (New Zealand)
- Recorded: 1986
- Genre: New wave
- Length: 3:30
- Songwriter: Dave Dobbyn

Dave Dobbyn singles chronology
| "Slice of Heaven" (1986) | "You Oughta Be In Love" (1986) | "Love You Like I Should" (1988) |

"You Oughta Be In Love" is a single by New Zealand singer/songwriter Dave Dobbyn featuring the band Ardijah, released in 1986 on the soundtrack of the animated motion picture, Footrot Flats: The Dog's ~~Tail~~ Tale. The single charted at No. 2 in New Zealand.

== Background ==
Dobbyn was asked to write a tune for the relationship between Footrot Flats farmer Wal Footrot and the object of his affection, hairdresser Cheeky Hobson. Assuming that the relationship was nothing serious, Dobbyn wrote a jaunty tune, but was told by Footrot Flats creator Murray Ball that "it's true love". With that in mind, he rewrote the song to be a ballad of true love.

== Covers and alternative versions ==
An edited version of "You Oughta Be In Love" is featured in the Footrot Flats movie that goes through the first and second verses and skips the first chorus. The film version has extra overdubbed spoken lyrics and visual gags poking fun at the lyrics and song.

The song was covered by Annie Crummer in her 1992 album Language, and New Zealand Idol winner Ben Lummis on the series album Homegrown.

== Awards ==
"You Oughta Be In Love" was awarded 'Best Single of the Year' at the 1987 New Zealand Music Awards. Dobbyn also won Best Male Vocalist, and was nominated for 'Songwriter of the Year' for the song (having won the category the year before with "Slice of Heaven" when it was called 'Song of the Year').

At the 1987 APRA Silver Scroll Awards, Dobbyn won the titular award (the APRA equivalent for songwriting).

== Legacy ==
"You Oughta Be In Love" was voted 70th-best New Zealand song by APRA in 2001 and featured on Nature's Best 3, a compilation of songs 66–100 on the list.

== Year-end charts ==
| Chart (1987) | Position |
|---|---|
| New Zealand (Recorded Music NZ) | 46 |

== Certifications ==
Certifications for "You Oughta Be In Love"
| Region | Certification | Certified units/sales |
|---|---|---|
| New Zealand (RMNZ) | Platinum | 30,000^{‡} |
^{‡} Sales+streaming figures based on certification alone.
