= Footrot Flats: The Dog's Tale (soundtrack) =

Footrot Flats: The Dog's ~~Tail~~ Tale

Soundtrack album by Dave Dobbyn
- Released: 14 November 1986
- Recorded: 1986
- Studios: Mandrill Studios (Auckland); Marmalade Studios (Wellington); CBS Studios (Sydney)
- Genre: Pop
- Length: 42:00
- Label: Magpie
- Producer: Dave Dobbyn

Dave Dobbyn chronology
The Optimist (1984)	Footrot Flats: The Dog's ~~Tail~~ Tale (1986)	Loyal (1988)

Singles from Footrot Flats: The Dog's Tale
- 1. "Slice of Heaven" Released: 12 September 1986; 2. "You Oughta Be In Love" Released: 21 December 1986

Footrot Flats: The Dog's ~~Tail~~ Tale – The Motion Picture Soundtrack is the soundtrack to the New Zealand animated film, Footrot Flats: The Dog's Tale. In February 1987, the album spent two weeks in the top five of the New Zealand albums chart.

== Background ==
Tim Finn was originally offered the chance to orchestrate the soundtrack. When he turned it down Dobbyn accepted the role.

== Track listing ==
All tracks are written by Dave Dobbyn, except for "Nuclear Waste" by Willie Hona, Tama Lundon and Rob van de Lisdonk.

Side one
No.	Title	Length
1.	"Footrot Mornin'" (instrumental)	3:01
2.	"Let's Get Canine" (featuring Betty-Anne Monga & Ardijah)	4:14
3.	"I Dream of Rugby" (featuring Sacred Heart College Choir)	2:43
4.	"Sat'dy Arvo"	3:45
5.	"Horse's Beat" (instrumental)	3:04
6.	"You Oughta Be in Love" (featuring Ardijah)	3:53
Total length:		20:40

Side two
No.	Title	Length
7.	"Vernon the Vermin" (featuring Ardijah)	3:18
8.	"Cooch" (instrumental)	2:20
9.	"Nuclear Waste" (performed by Herbs)	3:15
10.	"Blackwater" (instrumental)	1:54
11.	"Lost at Sea" (instrumental)	3:03
12.	"Top Dog" (featuring Ardijah)	3:00
13.	"Slice of Heaven" (featuring Herbs)	4:30
Total length:		21:20 42:00

Bonus track on 20th anniversary release (2006)
No.	Title	Length
14.	"You Oughta Be in Love (P-Money Remix)" (featuring P-Money)	3:51

- "Nuclear Waste" was originally released on Herbs' 1984 album Long Ago.

== Personnel ==
Personnel as listed in the album's liner notes are:

=== Musicians ===
- Dave Dobbyn — instruments (1, 3-5, 7, 8, 10-13), vocals (2-4, 6, 7, 12, 13), producer
- Sacred Heart College Choir — backing vocals (3)
- Ardijah
  - Betty Anne Monga — duet vocals (2), backing vocals (6, 7, 12)
  - Ryan Monga — backing vocals (2, 6, 7, 12)
  - Tony Nogotautama — backing vocals (2, 6, 7, 12)
- Herbs
  - Dilworth Karaka — guitar (9), vocals (9, 13)
  - Willie Hona — guitar (9), vocals (9, 13)
  - Charles Tumahai — bass guitar (9), vocals (9, 13)
  - Tama Lundon — keyboards (9), vocals (9, 13)
  - Morrie Watene — saxophone (9), vocals (9, 13)
  - Thom Nepia — percussion (9), vocals (9, 13)
  - Fred Faleauto — drums (9), vocals (9, 13)

=== Production ===
- Simon Tanks — engineer at CBS Studios
- Graeme Myhre — engineer at Mandrill Studios
- Nigel Stone — engineer at Marmalade Studios

== Charts ==
Chart (1987)	Peak position
Australia (Kent Music Report)	22
Official New Zealand Music Chart	5

== Certifications ==
Certifications for Footrot Flats: The Dog's Tale
Region	Certification	Certified units/sales
New Zealand (RMNZ)	2× Platinum	30,000^{‡}
^{‡} Sales+streaming figures based on certification alone.

== Awards ==
The soundtrack won a number of awards at the RIANZ New Zealand Music Awards. Both of the Footrot Flat singles were awarded Best Song of the Year at the New Zealand Music Awards (in 1986 and 1987 respectively). Dobbyn also won Best Male Vocalist in 1987 for his work on 'You Oughta Be in Love'.

Year	Award	Nominee / work	Result
1986	Best Song of the Year	"Slice of Heaven"	Won
1987	Album of the Year		Nominated
1987	Single of the Year	'You Oughta Be In Love'	Won
1987	Best Male Vocalist	Dave Dobbyn	Won
1987	Best Film Soundtrack		Won
1987	Best Producer	Dave Dobbyn	Nominated
1987	Best Songwriter	Dave Dobbyn - 'You Oughta Be In Love'	Nominated
1987	Best Cover	Reston Griffiths	Nominated
