= Homegrown (Herbs album) =

Album by Herbs

Studio album by Herbs
- Released: September 1990
- Studio: Mascot Recording Studios (Auckland)
- Genre: Pacific reggae
- Length: 40:03
- Label: Tribal
- Producers: Joe Walsh; Herbs; Stephen Smith

Herbs chronology
Sensitive to a Smile (1987)	Homegrown (1990)	13 Years of Herbs: The Best of (1993)

Singles from Homegrown
- 1. "Homegrown" Released: 1991

Homegrown is the fifth and final studio album by New Zealand reggae band Herbs. This album is notable for including the production assistance and playing of Joe Walsh, a former member of the Eagles, when he visited New Zealand in 1988. He performed with Herbs for a time before producing the album. Although the union lasted less than a year, Walsh credited the band with inspiring him to pursue sobriety.

== Track listing ==
All tracks are written by Dilworth Karaka, Charles Tumahai, Joe Walsh, Thom Nepia, Tama Lundon, Morrie Watene and Gordon Joll except where noted.

No.	Title	Writer(s)	Length
1.	"Amazing Grace"	Traditional	0:44
2.	"Up All Night"		3:34
3.	"Walk Away Renee"	Michael Brown; Bob Calilli; Tony Sansone	3:03
4.	"Anthem"		5:04
5.	"Homegrown"		4:16
6.	"Azania (Soon Come)"	Ross France	4:27
7.	"Ordinary Average Guys"	Karaka; Tumahai; Walsh	4:09
8.	"Way I Am"	Sonny Throckmorton	3:13
9.	"It's Alright"		3:30
10.	"Sometimes"		3:57
11.	"Talkback Radio"	Karaka; Tumahai; Walsh; Nepia; Lundon; Watene; Joll; Jon Gadsby	4:06
Total length:			40:03

== Personnel ==
Personnel as listed in the album's liner notes are:

=== Herbs ===
- Dilworth Karaka — guitar, vocals
- Charles Tumahai — bass guitar, vocals
- Thom Nepia — percussion, vocals
- Morrie Watene — saxophone, vocals
- Tama Lundon — keyboards, vocals
- Gordon Joll — drums

=== Additional musicians ===
- Errol Shute — steel guitar (track 8)

=== Production ===
- Joe Walsh — production (tracks 1-10)
- Victor Grbic — engineering
- Stephen Smith — engineering and production (track 11)
- Hugh Lynn — executive production
- Kyra Snoeck, Stuart Sontier, Andrew Prast — photography

== Awards ==
Year	Nominee / work	Award	Result
1990	Homegrown	1990 New Zealand Music Awards – Best Polynesian Album	Won
