= New Zealand reggae =

Music Subgenre

New Zealand reggae is the New Zealand variation of the musical genre reggae. It is a large and well established part of New Zealand music, and includes some of the country's most successful and highly acclaimed bands.

== History ==
Reggae bands in New Zealand the 1970s and 1980s included Herbs, Dread, Beat and Blood, Unity Pacific and the Twelve Tribes of Israel. The 1979 Bob Marley concert at Western Springs Stadium is credited with having a huge influence of the growth of reggae in the country and inspiring many prominent reggae artists The growth of the Rastafarian religion, particularly among Māori, was also a factor in the growth of the genre, and the high rates of use of marijuana among New Zealanders is likely to have had an influence. Reggae topped the charts in New Zealand in the early 1980s when Toots and the Maytals, the first artist to use the term "reggae" in song, went platinum with their song "Beautiful Woman".

The reggae scene is centred around the Waikato, Whanganui and the capital Wellington, with capital music having a more dub and jazz influenced sound. Most New Zealand reggae bands incorporate different stylistic influences, and the result is a unique combination of sounds.

The scene is not without its detractors and is referred to derisively as "BBQ reggae". The inference is that the music functions only as a boring, unchallenging backdrop for having a BBQ in the backyard. Sometimes this criticism is levelled at New Zealand reggae in particular, in contrast to other strains of reggae music.

The most successful of recent acts is Fat Freddy's Drop, who incorporate jazz, soul and dub influences and reflect the Wellington sound. They have won numerous awards and sold over 90,000 copies of their debut album. One of the most important groups of the last decade was Trinity Roots (1998–2005), who also melded sparse jazz melodies with their reggae to great effect. The Black Seeds are another group who have significant commercial success in recent times. Their albums On The Sun and Into the Dojo both sold double platinum and the group has toured extensively throughout Europe. Their latest album, Solid Ground, reached #15 on the US Reggae Charts.

Other major groups include Katchafire, Cornerstone Roots, 1814, Kora, House of Shem and Tahuna Breaks. Major dub/electronic groups and solo artists include Pitch Black, Deep Fried Dub, Shapeshifter, International Observer and Salmonella Dub.

== Festivals ==
The scene is live-performance based, and large reggae festivals occur annually. The most important are the Soundsplash Eco Reggae Festival in Raglan, the Kaikōura Roots Festival, and East Coast Vibes, a roots reggae festival held in January at the soundshell on Gisborne's Midway Beach. A strong collection of "soundsystems" exist, groups putting on parties and events with DJs and MCs. One Love and Raggamuffin are popular annual reggae concerts celebrating Bob Marley's birthday (February 6), a date that coincides with New Zealand public holiday Waitangi Day.
