= Razorwyre =

- Origin: Wellington, New Zealand
- Genres: Speed metal Power metal
- Years active: 2009–present
- Label: Infernö Records
- Members: Zane Chylde; James Murray; Chris Calavrias; Dave Hampton; Nick Oakes
- Past members: Simon Smith Diamond Tim
- Website: http://www.razorwyreband.com

Razorwyre is a speed/power metal band from Wellington, New Zealand. Formed in 2009 under the name Gaywyre, they released an EP entitled "Coming Out" under that name before changing their name to Razorwyre in 2010. The "Coming Out" EP was re-released on cassette in 2011 by Infernö Records, limited to 100 copies. That release led to a deal with the same label to release their debut full-length, "Another Dimension" in 2012.

They were scheduled to perform at the Keep It True XVI festival in Germany in 2013, but cancelled their performance because their drummer broke both of his arms.

== Discography ==
=== Albums ===
- Another Dimension – (2012)

=== Singles/EPs ===
- Coming Out – EP (2009)
- Coming Out – Cassette single (2011)

== Members ==
=== Current lineup ===
- Zane Chylde – Vocals
- James Murray – Guitar
- Chris Calavrias – Guitar
- Dave Hampton – Bass
- Nick Oakes – Drums
