= Sensitive to a Smile (album) =

Album by Herbs

Studio album by Herbs
- Released: June 1987
- Studio: Mascot Recording Studios (Auckland)
- Genre: Pacific reggae
- Length: 37:23
- Label: Warrior
- Producer: Billy Kristian

Herbs chronology
| Long Ago (1984) | Sensitive to a Smile (1987) | Homegrown (1990) |

Singles from Sensitive to a Smile
- 1. "Sensitive to a Smile" Released: 1987; 2. "Rust in Dust" Released: 1987; 3. "Listen" Released: 1988; 4. "No Nukes (The Second Letter)" Released: 1989

Sensitive to a Smile is the fourth studio album by New Zealand reggae band Herbs. It reached number 10 and spent 30 weeks in the New Zealand album chart and was awarded Album of the Year at the 1987 New Zealand Music Awards. The album included the four singles "Sensitive to a Smile", "Rust In Dust", "Listen" and "No Nukes (The Second Letter)", all of which charted. Sensitive to a Smile was re-released on CD and digitally, with extra tracks from Herbs' 1984 album Long Ago and their 1982 single "French Letter".

The album was launched at Mangahanea marae in Ruatoria, as a gesture of unity to Ruatoria after it had seen conflict between local Rastafarian groups and the community, as well as arson attacks. The launch concert was filmed by director Lee Tamahori and became the basis of the music video for the first single "Sensitive to a Smile".

Fred Faleauto and Dilworth Karaka first recorded a version of "E Papa" with the Pātea Māori Club who released it as a reggae pop single in 1985. The song is a traditional composition sung during tītī tōrea (stick games).

== Track listing ==
Side one
| No. | Title | Writer(s) | Length |
|---|---|---|---|
| 1. | "E Pāpā" | Traditional | 2:06 |
| 2. | "Travellin' in Style" | Paul Rodgers; Simon Kirke; Tetsu Yamauchi; Paul Kossoff; John Bundrick | 4:18 |
| 3. | "No Nukes (The Second Letter to France)" | Dilworth Karaka; Charles Tumahai | 4:13 |
| 4. | "Sunshine at Night" | Tama Lundon; Willie Hona; Todd Casella | 3:31 |
| 5. | "Sensitive to a Smile" | Karaka; Tumahai; Casella | 4:29 |
| Total length: | | | 18:37 |

Side two
| No. | Title | Writer(s) | Length |
|---|---|---|---|
| 6. | "Rust in Dust" | Karaka; Tumahai | 3:25 |
| 7. | "Listen" | Lundon; Hona; Casella | 4:31 |
| 8. | "Station of Love" | Hona; Thom Nepia; Fred Faleauto | 3:53 |
| 9. | "Pay the Man" | Karaka; Tumahai | 3:54 |
| 10. | "Jah Knows" | Karaka; Hona | 3:03 |
| Total length: | | | 18:46 37:23 |

Bonus tracks on CD and digital release
| No. | Title | Writer(s) | Length |
|---|---|---|---|
| 11. | "Karanga Rā / Long Ago" | Traditional; Hona; Lundon | 4:58 |
| 12. | "Nuclear Waste" | Hona; Lundon; Rob van de Lisdonk | 4:25 |
| 13. | "French Letter" | Karaka; Toni Fonoti; Spencer Fusimalohi | 4:35 |
| 14. | "Repatriation" | Karaka; Peter Stretch | 4:14 |

== Personnel ==
Personnel as listed in the album's liner notes are:

=== Herbs ===
- Fred Faleauto – drums, vocals
- Dilworth Karaka – guitar, vocals
- Morrie Watene – saxophone, vocals
- Willie Hona – guitar, vocals
- Tama Lundon – keyboards, vocals
- Charles Tumahai – bass guitar, vocals
- Thom Nepia – percussion, vocals

=== Production ===
- Billy Kristian – production
- Victor Grbic – engineering
- Hugh Lynn – executive production

== Awards ==
| Year | Nominee / work | Award | Result |
|---|---|---|---|
| 1987 | Sensitive to a Smile | 1987 New Zealand Music Awards – Album of the Year | Won |
| 1987 | Billy Kristian for Sensitive to a Smile | 1987 New Zealand Music Awards – Best Producer | Won |
| 1987 | E Papa — Jah Knows | 1987 New Zealand Music Awards – Best Polynesian Album | Won |

== Charts ==
=== Weekly charts ===
| Chart (1987) | Peak position |
|---|---|
| New Zealand Albums (RMNZ) | 10 |

=== Year-end charts ===
| Chart (1987) | Position |
|---|---|
| New Zealand Albums (RMNZ) | 29 |

== Certifications ==
| Region | Certification | Certified units/sales |
|---|---|---|
| New Zealand (RMNZ) | Gold | 7,500^{^} |
^{^} Shipments figures based on certification alone.
