= The Plaza Shopping Centre =

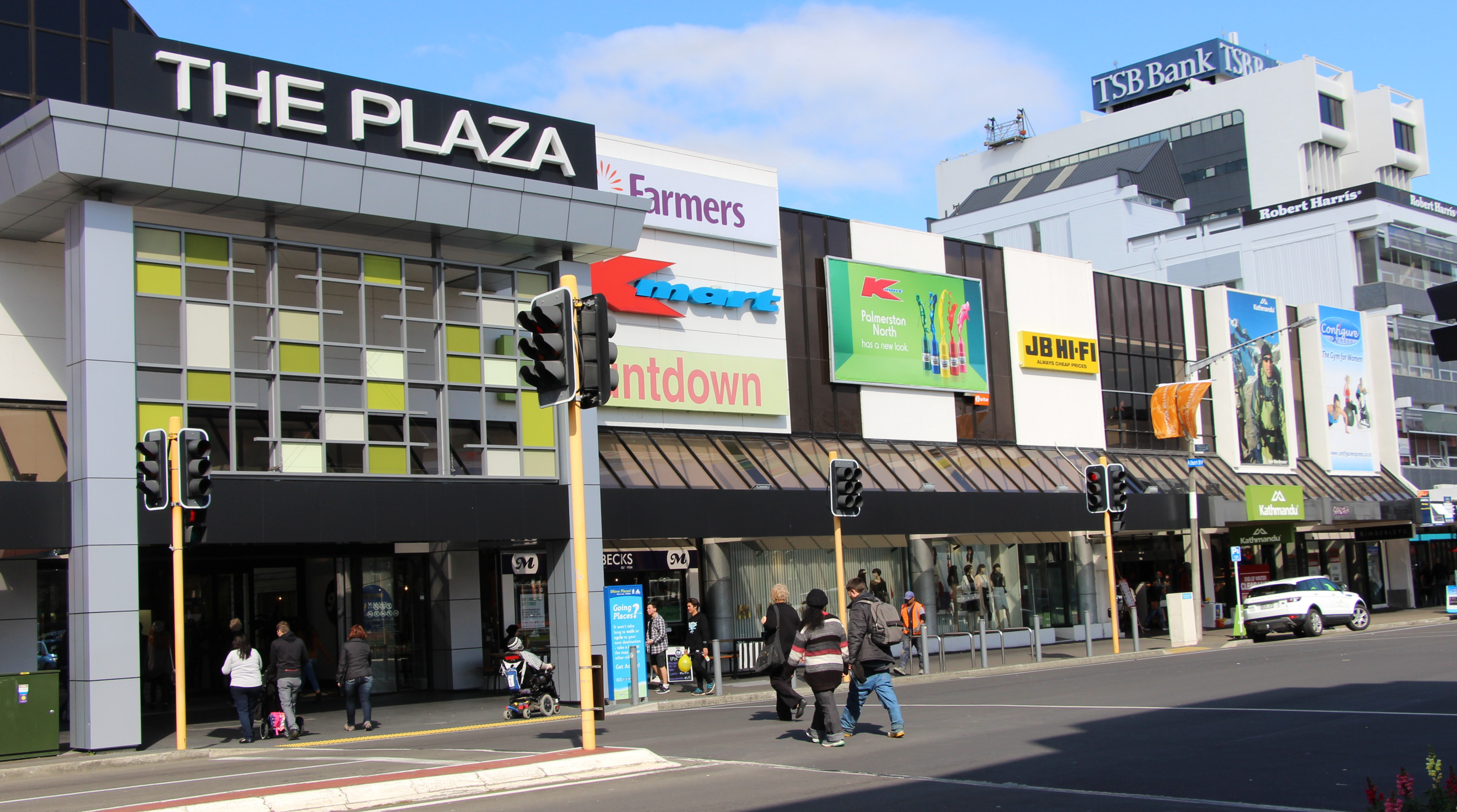
- Location: Palmerston North, New Zealand
- Coordinates: 40°21′25″S 175°36′47″E
- Opened: 11 April 1986
- Owner: Kiwi Property
- Num. of stores: 100+
- Num. of anchor tenants: 4
- Floor area: 32,000 m^{2} (340,000 sq ft)
- Floors: 1
- Parking: 1200 Parking Spaces
- Website: https://www.theplaza.co.nz/

The Plaza Shopping Centre is a shopping mall in the central area of Palmerston North, New Zealand, owned by Kiwi Property. It is the largest shopping mall in the Manawatū–Whanganui region.

== History ==
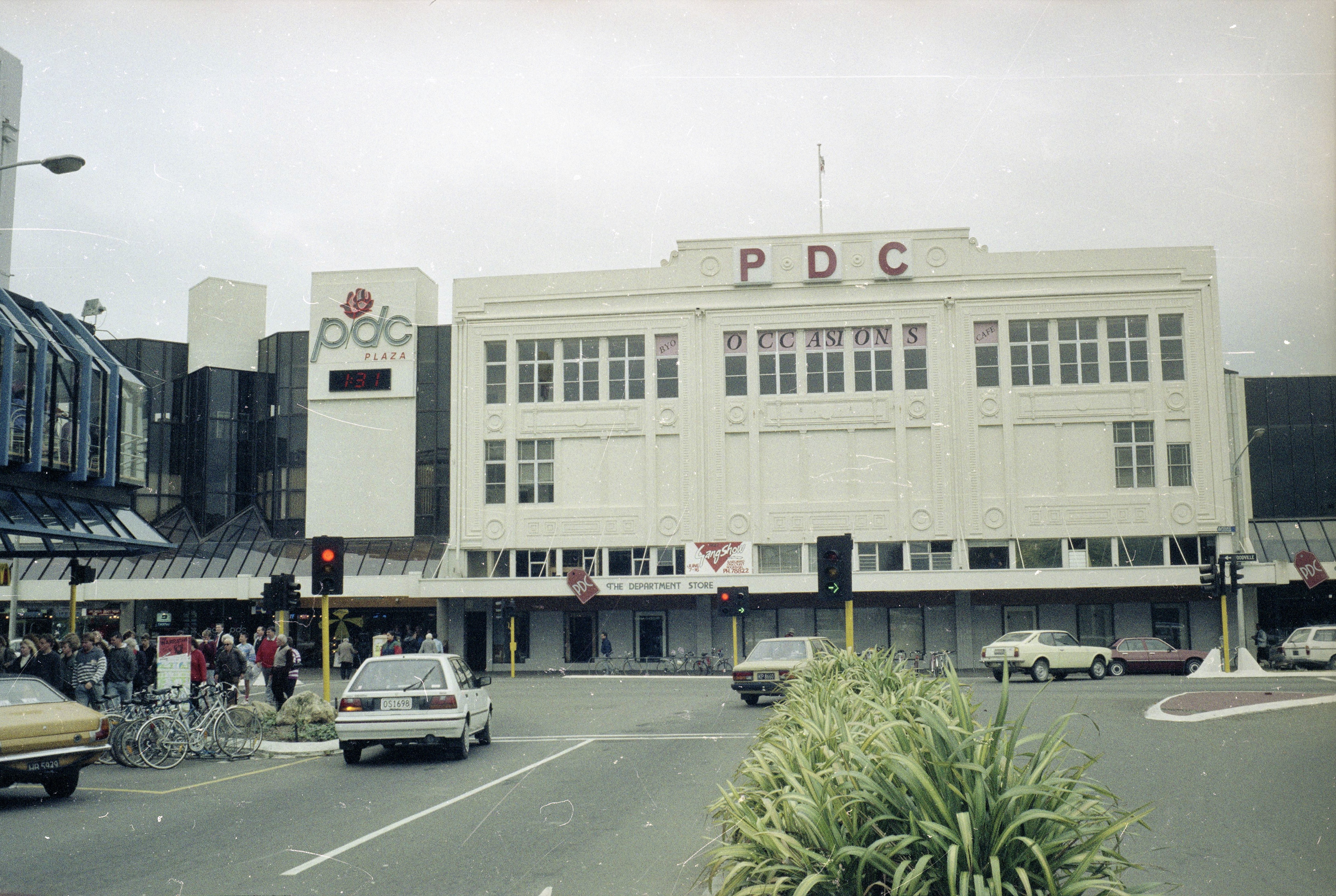
The PDC Plaza and Department Store in early 1990.

The mall was officially opened by Prime Minister David Lange on 11 April 1986 as the PDC Plaza. The Premier Drapery Company (PDC) was a major department store in Palmerston North, owned by the Manawatu Co-Operative Society. The mall was developed around the PDC department store in response to the trend away from department stores towards shopping malls. Declining turnover coupled with the 1987 stock market crash saw PDC and the Co-Operative Society go into receivership in 1988, and the mall and department store were sold off. The PDC department store was closed and demolished in 1990 to make way for an extension of the mall.

Originally 19,700 m^{2} (212,000 sq ft), the mall underwent redevelopment from 2008 to 2010 refurbishing the existing space and expanding to 32,000 m^{2} (340,000 sq ft). Redevelopment was done in three stages. The first stage opened on 3 March 2009 with a new food court, a multi-level carpark and 15 new specialty stores. The second stage opened on 3 September 2009 with an additional 10 specialty stores. The third stage opened in March 2010 with the addition of 32 specialty stores, a two-storey 7,200 m^{2} (78,000 sq ft) Farmers department store and another multi-level carpark.
