= Willie Hona =

New Zealand musician (1953–2024)

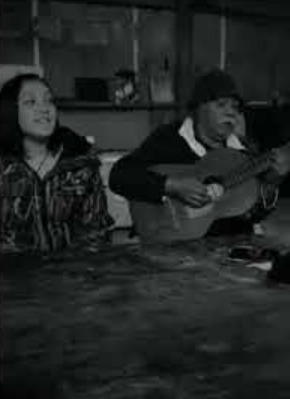
- Hona (right) in 2019

Background information
- Born: Wiremu Hona; 22 July 1953; Rawene, New Zealand
- Died: 5 May 2024 (aged 70) Paraparaumu, New Zealand
- Formerly of: Herbs, the Face

Wiremu Hona (22 July 1953 – 5 May 2024) was a New Zealand musician.

== Early life and career ==
Wiremu Hona was born in Rawene on 22 July 1953.

Hona's career began alongside Mark Williams, Mack Tane and Gregg Findlay in the band the Face.

In 1983 he released She Needs You and it reached #41 on the New Zealand Charts.

In 1983 he also joined Herbs as singer and guitarist. He appeared on two albums, Long Ago (1984) and Sensitive to a Smile (1987) and on multiple singles such as songs Slice of Heaven, Sensitive to a Smile and Listen. He left the band in late 1988.

In 1991 he released a solo album called Keep an Open Heart.

== Death ==
Hona died from pancreatic cancer in Paraparaumu, on 5 May 2024, aged 70.

== Discography ==
List of demo albums
Title	Album details
Keep an Open Heart	Released: 1991; Label: Festival Records (D30704); Format: CD, Cassette

=== Singles ===
List of singles with selected New Zealand positions
Title	Year	Peak chart positions	Album
Title	Year	NZ	Album
1983	"She Needs You"	43	
1991	"Keep An Open Heart"	–	Keep An Open Heart

== Awards ==
=== Aotearoa Music Awards ===
The Aotearoa Music Awards are an annual awards night celebrating excellence in New Zealand music and have been presented annually since 1965.

Year	Nominee / work	Award	Result	Ref.
2012	Willie Hona (as part of Herbs)	New Zealand Music Hall of Fame	inductee	
