= Wilfrid Mervyn Lusty =

New Zealand journalist, drama critic, theatre administrator, and adult educationalist

Wilfrid Mervyn Lusty (25 March 1907–31 May 1987) was a New Zealand journalist, drama critic, theatre administrator and adult educationalist. He was born in Auckland, Auckland, New Zealand on 25 March 1907.
