= What's Be Happen? =

Studio album by Herbs
- Released: July 1981
- Studio: Mascot Recording Studios (Auckland)
- Genres: New Zealand reggae, Pacific reggae
- Length: 27:00
- Label: Warrior
- Producer: Herbs

Herbs chronology
What's Be Happen? (1981)	Light of the Pacific (1983)

What's Be Happen? is the debut studio album by New Zealand reggae band Herbs. The album was released in July 1981 on the eve of the 1981 Springbok tour by Warrior Records, only the second album to be released by the label at that point.

What's Be Happen? is overtly political, with lyrical topics including Apartheid and the Dawn Raids on Polynesian immigrants to New Zealand, as well as general commentary on life for Māori and Pasifika in New Zealand at the time. The album's cover art features an image of Māori protestors at Bastion Point being surrounded by police on 25 May 1978, which saw the arrest of 222 people protesting the confiscation of Māori land formerly occupied by Ngāti Whātua Ōrākei. The album's title is a reference to Marvin Gaye's 1971 album What's Going On, reflecting the similar lyrical themes explored between the two albums. Political themes have since continued to be a core aspect of Herbs' music, with Herbs member Dilworth Karaka describing What's Be Happen? as "a strong indicator" of the political material they could continue to produce throughout the band's career.

== Composition ==
What's Be Happen? is often seen as the first album of both Pacific and New Zealand reggae, blending reggae themes and styles with traditional Polynesian rhythms and musical structure. This is seen through elements such as the use of Cook Islands pātē on the title track and frequent use of the so-called "Māori strum" method of guitar on tracks throughout the record. As a result, the album has been described as representing a watershed moment in the development of a distinct form of reggae within New Zealand and establishing Herbs as a prominent band within that.

Upon release, the album did not gain much mainstream traction and sold very little, peaking at 40 in the New Zealand charts and only placing on the charts for two weeks in August 1981. Despite this, the album has endured as a defining moment for Pacific reggae and, in 2015, was awarded the Independent Music NZ Classic Record award as part of that year's Taite Music Prize. Judges at the time said that this was to recognise the album as "a vital slice of [New Zealand's] cultural history and a landmark for Pacific reggae."

The album's final song, "Reggae's Doing Fine", was written as a tribute to reggae pioneer Bob Marley, who had died a few months prior to the album's release.

== Track listing ==
All tracks are written by Toni Fonoti except where noted.

Side one
No.	Title	Writer(s)	Length
1.	"Azania (Soon Come)"	Ross France	3:12
2.	"Dragons and Demons"		4:44
3.	"What's Be Happen?"		4:08
Total length:			12:04

Side two
No.	Title	Writer(s)	Length
4.	"One Brotherhood"	Phil Toms	6:25
5.	"Whistling in the Dark"		3:49
6.	"Reggae's Doing Fine"		4:42
Total length:			14:56 27:00

== Personnel ==
Personnel as listed in the album's liner notes are:

=== Herbs ===
- Dilworth Karaka — rhythm guitar, vocals
- Spencer "Spenz" Fusimalohi — lead guitar, vocals
- Fred Faleauto — drums, vocals
- Phil Toms — bass guitar, lead vocals (track 4)
- Toni Fonoti — lead vocals, percussion

=== Additional musicians ===
- Hycinth Wolf, Ronnie Nee Nee, Ross France, Will 'Ilolahia — backing vocals (track 1)
- Rarotonganui Cultural Club — percussion (track 3)

=== Production ===
- Gerard Carr — recording
- Phil Yule — recording and mixing

== Weekly charts ==
Chart (1981)	Peak position
New Zealand Albums (RMNZ)	40
