= Willie Lonsdale =

New Zealand cricketer (born 1986)

William Meehan Lonsdale (born 16 September 1986) is a New Zealand cricketer. He is a left arm medium fast bowler and a right hand middle order batsman. He made his first class debut against the Wellington Firebirds in 2007.
