= French Letter (song) =

- French Letter 1995 cover art

Single by Herbs

from the album Light of the Pacific
- B-side: "French Letter (Dub)"
- Released: 1982
- Studio: Mascot Recording Studios
- Genre: Pacific reggae
- Length: 4:35 (album version); 3:35 (single version); 5:19 (Megaton version); 3:41 (1995 single)
- Label: Warrior Records
- Songwriter: Toni Fonoti
- Producers: Herbs, Phil Yule

Herbs singles chronology
"French Letter" (1982)	"Jah's Son" (1982)

"French Letter" (occasionally labelled as A Letter to France) is the debut single by New Zealand reggae band Herbs. The song was written to protest French nuclear weapons testing at Mururoa atoll in nearby French Polynesia, and was the lead single from the band's second album, Light of the Pacific. Despite receiving little radio airplay due to the innuendo in the song's title, the song spent 15 weeks in the New Zealand Top 40, peaking at number 11.

Since its release, the song has become emblematic of New Zealand's stance against nuclear weapons and the role of music in political activism of the era, with political messages being a regular feature of Herbs' music. An updated version of the song, titled "French Letter '95", was released in 1995 to coincide with a resumption in French nuclear testing in the region, which spent a further 8 weeks in the charts and reached a peak position of #9. The song's enduring legacy led to the Australasian Performing Right Association naming "French Letter" as the 42nd best New Zealand song of all time in 2001.

== Background and writing ==
As with their debut EP What's Be Happen? from the previous year, "French Letter" reflected Herbs' strong connections to political activism, particularly in relation to the Pacific. The band had ties to the Polynesian Panthers through their manager (and subsequent band member) Will ’Ilolahia, with members of the band tracing their origins to various Pacific islands. French Letter was written by Herbs vocalist Toni Fonoti as a protest against the French government's testing of nuclear weapons at the atolls of Mururoa and Fangataufa and the potential impact which this would have on the region. When asked about the background of the song, Dilworth Karaka described seeing the impact of the tests on whānau from Tahiti and the Cook Islands who would get sick and have to come to New Zealand for medical treatment.

Nuclear testing was first carried out in French Polynesia in July 1966 and continued through to February 1996. The testing of nuclear weapons in the region was widely condemned by nearby countries including New Zealand, who in 1973 formally challenged France's atmospheric testing at the International Court of Justice and sent the Royal New Zealand Navy frigates HMNZS Canterbury and HMNZS Otago to French Polynesia in protest of the tests. The testing was widely opposed by the New Zealand public for moral and environmental reasons, a sentiment which was tapped into and brought to a greater audience by French Letter.

== Release and reception ==
"French Letter" was originally released as a single in 1982 – the band's first, despite having previously released an EP. Initially, the song received little airplay from radio stations due to the title's innuendo (French letter being a British term for a condom), and would refer to the song as "a Letter to France" when playing it. The track first entered the New Zealand top 40 in the week of 22 August 1982, partially a result of manager Will ’Ilolahia targeting stock to record stores which were used to compile the charts and sending friends to buy from those stores. The single steadily climbed to a peak of #11 and spent a total of 15 weeks in the charts during its first run.

In contrast to the reception in New Zealand, the song and its staunch anti-nuclear stance led to it being banned in all French territories. Herbs soon played a show in Tahiti where they ignored the ban and played the song, later recalling the image of British members of the French Foreign Legion singing along to the song while on leave from their posts at Mururoa.

In 1995, the French government announced the resumption of nuclear testing in French Polynesia, a move which was met with widespread condemnation and protests. As part of the response to this decision, Herbs re-recorded "French Letter", releasing it as "French Letter '95" and accompanying it with a music video. The re-released version re-entered the charts in the week of 6 August 1995, debuting at #10 and reaching a peak of #9, but remaining on the charts for a shorter run of 8 weeks.

== Music video ==
While the original release of French Letter was not accompanied by a video, one accompanied the 1995 re-release. This video features Herbs performing "French Letter", interspersed with images of traditional Pacific images and of nuclear weapons tests. The video was produced in conjunction with Greenpeace New Zealand as part of their campaign for banning nuclear weapons testing in the Pacific.

== Track listing ==
French Letter:

1. "French Letter" – 3:35
2. "French Letter" – 4:35

French Letter '95:

1. "French Letter 1995" – 3:41
2. "Kia Ora Party"

== Legacy ==
Since its release, "French Letter" has come to symbolise a core part of both the New Zealand and Pacific Islander response to nuclear testing. The song continues to be used as a symbol of New Zealand's staunch anti-nuclear stance, which in turn has become part of New Zealand's cultural identity as a whole. The song's enduring legacy led to the Australasian Performing Right Association naming French Letter as the 42nd best New Zealand song of all time in 2001. The song was credited for increasing awareness of nuclear testing as part of a campaign that led to the establishment of a nuclear-free zone in 1987.

== Charts ==
Chart (1995)	Peak position
New Zealand (Recorded Music NZ)	9

== Certifications ==
Region	Certification	Certified units/sales
New Zealand (RMNZ)	Gold	15,000^{‡}
^{‡} Sales+streaming figures based on certification alone.
