= Tahuna Breaks =

- Genres: Funk/Dance
- Years active: 2005–2016
- Members: Marty Greentree – Vocals/guitar; Jonny McClean – ...Saxophone/percussion/synth; Jimi Winkle – Guitar; Adam Fuhr – ...Keyboards/synth/talkbox; Tim Gillon – Bass/backing vocals Jono Sawyer – Drums
- Past members: Tim Gemmell; Tom Charleson; Kelsey Serjeant; Joe Rowley; Liz Herron; Nick Taylor; Tim Baker
- Website: www.facebook.com/Tahunabreaks/

Tahuna Breaks was a band from New Zealand that formed in Auckland in January 2005. The band was named after Tahuna Street where they had their first jam. Their musical style incorporated elements of reggae, soul and electro funk music.

== Origins ==
Tahuna Breaks began as an instrumental band in 2005. The idea originated at Deschlers Bar on Auckland's High Street when some of its members-to-be were watching a funk band perform. The original line-up consisted of Marty Greentree (guitar/bass), Tim Gemmell (drums), Jimi Winkle (bass/guitar) and Kelsey Serjeant (tenor sax). The band began gigging at a local bar playing four or five original songs, and improvised further songs when the bar manager requested they play longer for their fee. Marty Greentree came up with a new song idea with lyrics and, after its first performance, friends in the crowd suggested that the band should incorporate more of Greentree's singing as opposed to pure instrumentals. The band demoed three songs with the Rock Factory in 2005, one of which, 'Crisis Situation', received airplay via Jason Kerrison's show on Kiwi FM.

== Albums, personnel, tours ==
The band continued to write songs in a storage shed in Auckland during 2006 and recorded their first album with Andrew Buckton at Studio 203. 'Reflections' contained a range of styles from funk, rock, soul, dub to drum and bass. In order to play the songs on the album live, the band recruited Tim Baker on keyboards and Tom Charleson on guitar. The band commenced its first national tour during 2007 and continued experimenting with its live sound. Before the recording of its second album, the band had grown to eight members with the addition of Jonny McClean on alto sax/percussion and Adam Fuhr on keyboards.

The band's second album 'Black, Brown & White' was recorded with Lee Prebble at The Surgery in Wellington in late 2008. It utilised the skills of the new members to create a bigger sound. Greentree drew on a wide range of experiences in writing the lyrics to the songs, including his upbringing in a Mormon family, experiences in the New Zealand Police, his renowned reputation for partying and his family life as the father of three children.

'Black, Brown & White' was released in 2009. Controversy arose when the animated music video for the second single from the album, 'Giddy Up', was released: directed and illustrated by Leah Morgan and produced by Fish N Clips, the video featured a highly stylised sperm as the pinball in a whimsically sexual pinball machine. The video was initially banned from YouTube and then, as a publicity stunt and protest, was uploaded to Youporn. It has since been reinstated to YouTube, and can also be seen on Vimeo.

New Zealand-based online magazine Elsewhere said Black Brown & White was "beautifully crafted, well written" and "thoroughly enjoyable all round", but with the reservation that it was "too much of something-for-everyone."

The band changed its approach to songwriting for its third album 'Shadow Light', released in 2013. Chief songwriter Greentree captured and refined ideas on a home-recording setup, in contrast to the two previous albums where ideas that were generated in the band's storage shed were recorded for the first time in a studio environment. Greentree commented that "this has led to a more focused sound that the band has refined from the lessons learnt touring". UK-based artists Crazy P produced the album, assisting the band with its goal of shifting to a more electro funk sound.

In 2015, the band fulfilled a long-held ambition by playing at Glastonbury Festival.

== Conclusion ==
Tahuna Breaks announced its breakup in early 2016. Tahuna Breaks played its last gig to a sell-out crowd at The Studio, Auckland, on 14 May 2016.

== Discography ==
- Reflections (October 25, 2007)
- Black Brown & White (August 30, 2009)
- Shadow Light (April 7, 2013)
