= Long Ago (album) =

Album by Herbs

Studio album by Herbs
- Released: October 1984
- Studio: Mascot Recording Studios (Auckland)
- Genre: Pacific reggae
- Length: 40:04
- Label: Warrior
- Producer: Billy Kristian

Herbs chronology
Light of the Pacific (1983)	Long Ago (1984)	Sensitive to a Smile (1987)

Singles from Long Ago
- 1. "Long Ago" Released: 1984; 2. "Nuclear Waste" Released: 1985; 3. "On My Mind" Released: 1985

Long Ago is the third studio album by New Zealand reggae band Herbs.

== Track listing ==
Side one
No.	Title	Writer(s)	Length
1.	"Karanga Rā"	Traditional	0:24
2.	"Long Ago"	Willie Hona; Tama Lundon	4:26
3.	"Jah Reggae"	Carl Perkins; Morrie Watene	4:17
4.	"Lonely Faces"	Dilworth Karaka; Fred Faleauto	2:55
5.	"On My Mind"	Hona; Lundon	4:16
6.	"Repatriation"	Karaka; Peter Stretch	4:12
Total length:			20:30

Side two
No.	Title	Writer(s)	Length
7.	"Nuclear Waste"	Hona; Lundon; Rob van de Lisdonk	4:27
8.	"Stolen Time"	Perkins; Jack Allen	5:02
9.	"Tahu's Song"	Karaka; Emory Tahu	5:02
10.	"In the Ghetto"	Lundon; Danny Wilson	4:04
11.	"Goin' Home" (instrumental)	Hona; Lundon; Perkins; Watene; Karaka; Faleauto; Allen	0:59
Total length:			19:34 40:04

- A shortened version of "Nuclear Waste" would later be featured on Dave Dobbyn's soundtrack album for the 1986 film Footrot Flats: The Dog's Tale.

== Personnel ==
Personnel as listed in the album's liner notes are:

=== Herbs ===
- Fred Faleauto — drums
- Jack Allen — bass guitar
- Carl Perkins — percussion
- Tama Lundon — keyboards
- Morrie Watene — saxophone
- Willie Hona — guitar
- Dilworth Karaka — guitar

=== Production ===
- Billy Kristian — production
- Phil Yule — recording and mixing
- Hugh Lynn — executive production
- Norman Te Whata, Emily Karaka — cover artwork
- Richard Collins — cover design

== Awards ==
Year	Nominee / work	Award	Result
1985	Long Ago	1985 New Zealand Music Awards – Album of the Year	Nominated
1985	Long Ago	1985 New Zealand Music Awards – Polynesian Album of the Year	Won
1985	Norman Te Whata and Emily Karaka for Long Ago	1985 New Zealand Music Awards – Best Cover	Nominated

== Weekly charts ==
Chart (1984–1985)	Peak position
New Zealand Albums (RMNZ)	39

== Certifications ==
Region	Certification	Certified units/sales
New Zealand (RMNZ)	Gold	7,500^{‡}
^{‡} Sales+streaming figures based on certification alone.
