= Light of the Pacific =

Album by Herbs

Studio album by Herbs
- Released: March 1983
- Studio: Mascot Recording Studios (Auckland)
- Genre: Pacific reggae
- Length: 35:49
- Label: Warrior
- Producers: Herbs; Phil Yule

Herbs chronology
What's Be Happen? (1981)	Light of the Pacific (1983)	Long Ago (1984)

Singles from Light of the Pacific
- 1. "French Letter" Released: 1982; 2. "Jah's Son" Released: 1982; 3. "Meteli" Released: 1983

Light of the Pacific is the second studio album by New Zealand reggae band Herbs. The album was released in March 1983 by Warrior Records. The album includes Herbs' first hit single in "French Letter", written by Toni Fonoti before his departure from the band later in 1982.

== Track listing ==
Side one
No.	Title	Writer(s)	Length
1.	"French Letter (Megaton Version)"	Toni Fonoti; Spencer Fusimalohi; Dilworth Karaka	5:19
2.	"Them's the Breaks"	Fonoti; Karaka	3:32
3.	"Mama's Song"	Fusimalohi	3:08
4.	"Meteli"	Fusimalohi; Karaka; Jack Allen; Morrie Watene	6:32
Total length:			18:31

Side two
No.	Title	Writer(s)	Length
5.	"Jah's Son"	Fusimalohi	6:20
6.	"Crazy Mon?"	Karaka; Fred Faleauto	4:03
7.	"Light of the Pacific"	Fonoti; Karaka	6:55
Total length:			17:18 35:49

== Personnel ==
Personnel as listed in the album's liner notes are:

=== Herbs ===
- Jack Allen – bass guitar
- Dilworth Karaka — rhythm guitar, vocals
- Morrie Watene — saxophone, vocals
- Spencer "Spenz" Fusimalohi — lead guitar, vocals
- Fred Faleauto — drums, vocals

=== Additional musicians ===
- Maurice Jones — accordion (track 1)
- Brian Fonoti — percussion (track 2)
- Tama Renata — backing vocals (tracks 6, 7), acoustic guitar (track 7)
- Brian Glamuzina — harmonica (track 7)
- Kerry Lamb, Malcolm Smith — synthesizers (track 7)
- Corina Fleming, Bunny Walters — backing vocals (track 7)

=== Production ===
- Sharon Graham — "Radio Waste" intro (track 1)
- Gerard Carr — drum programming (track 7)
- Phil Yule — recording and mixing
- Barry Linton — cover artwork

== Awards ==
Year	Nominee / work	Award	Result
1983	Light of the Pacific	1983 New Zealand Music Awards – Album of the Year	Nominated

== Weekly charts ==
Chart (1983)	Peak position
New Zealand Albums (RMNZ)	49
