= Language (Annie Crummer album) =

Studio album by Annie Crummer
- Released: 1992
- Studio: Marmalade (Wellington); Mandrill (Auckland); Airforce (Auckland); The Boatshed (Auckland); 301 (Sydney)
- Genre: Pop
- Length: 55:02
- Label: WEA Music
- Producer: Nigel Stone; Annie Crummer

Annie Crummer chronology
Language (1992)	Seventh Wave (1996)

Singles from Language
- 1. "See What Love Can Do" Released: 1992; 2. "Language" Released: 1992; 3. "See Forever" Released: 1993; 4. "Seven Waters" Released: 1993

Language is the debut solo album by New Zealand singer Annie Crummer, released in 1992.

== Background and development ==
Although Crummer had been offered a number of record contracts following her appearance on the Netherworld Dancing Toys' 1985 hit "For Today," which reached No. 3 on the New Zealand charts, she prioritized her membership in supergroup When The Cat's Away and did not begin work on her first major solo project until 1991. Produced by Crummer herself alongside Nigel Stone, much of Language was recorded in Auckland, though parts were also recorded in Wellington, Sydney, and the Cook Islands, her father's home country.

== Track listing ==
Track listing and song credits adapted from CD liner notes.

No.	Title	Writer(s)	Length
1.	"Language"	Annie Crummer; Don Freeman; David Batteau	5:30
2.	"See Forever"	Crummer	4:41
3.	"See What Love Can Do"	Jerry Lynn Williams	4:35
4.	"All I Know"	Jerry Ragovoy; Estelle Levitt	5:47
5.	"You Oughta Be In Love"	Dave Dobbyn	5:18
6.	"Surrender"	Keith Reid; Maggie Ryder	5:40
7.	"Provocative"	Reid; Ryder	3:40
8.	"More Than A Feeling"	Tom Scholz	6:18
9.	"Make Up"	Mahinārangi Tocker	3:24
10.	"Seven Waters"		4:39
11.	"Guilty"	Dobbyn	5:30
Total length:			55:02

== Personnel ==
Credits adapted from CD liner notes.

- Annie Crummer – production, lead vocals
- Nigel Stone – production, recording (tracks 1–8, 10, 11), sequence programming, drum/percussion programming (tracks 1–8, 10)
- Raging Goose Productions – executive production
- Peter Blake – synth bass (track 6)
- Callie Blood – backing vocals (tracks 2, 8)
- Jackie Clarke – backing vocals (tracks 1, 2, 5, 8)
- Clive Cockburn – strings (track 2), vocoder (track 7)
- Liz Fa'alogo – backing vocals (tracks 2, 5, 8)
- Jay Foulkes – percussion (track 11)
- Dave Fraser – strings (track 11)
- Steve Garden – drums (track 11)
- Barbara Griffin – backing vocals (tracks 2, 5, 8), piano/keyboards (tracks 1–8, 10), synth bass (track 6)
- Debbie Harwood – backing vocals (track 6)
- Herbs – backing vocals
- Peter Kekel – piano/keyboards (track 11)
- Suzanne Lynch – backing vocals (tracks 7, 11)
- Dennis Mason – saxophone (track 7)
- Ross McDermott – bass guitar (track 11)
- Nick Morgan – recording (track 11)
- Tony Mosely – backing vocals (tracks 1, 2, 4, 7, 10)
- Graham Myhre – recording (track 9)
- Jeff Neil – guitar (track 8)
- Dave Parsons – vocoder (track 7)
- Brendan Power – harmonica (track 11)
- Sheryl Rogers – backing vocals (tracks 2, 5, 8)
- Bob Smith – organ (tracks 6, 10)
- Gina Stevens – backing vocals (tracks 2, 8)
- Lance Su'a – guitar (tracks 1, 3, 6, 9)
- Gary Verberne – guitar (tracks 8, 11)
- Anthony Wallace – drum/percussion programming (tracks 4, 7)
- Rob Winch – backing vocals (tracks 2, 5, 8, 10), drum/percussion programming (track 5), bass guitar (tracks 1–5, 8, 10) guitar (tracks 2, 3, 8, 10), mandolin (track 10), percussion (track 1)

== Charts ==
=== Weekly charts ===
Chart (1993)	Peak position
New Zealand Albums (RMNZ)	9

=== Year-end charts ===
Chart (1993)	Position
New Zealand Albums (RMNZ)	33

== Certifications ==
Region	Certification	Certified units/sales
New Zealand (RMNZ)	Gold	7,500^{^}
^{^} Shipments figures based on certification alone.
