= Herbs (band) =

New Zealand reggae group

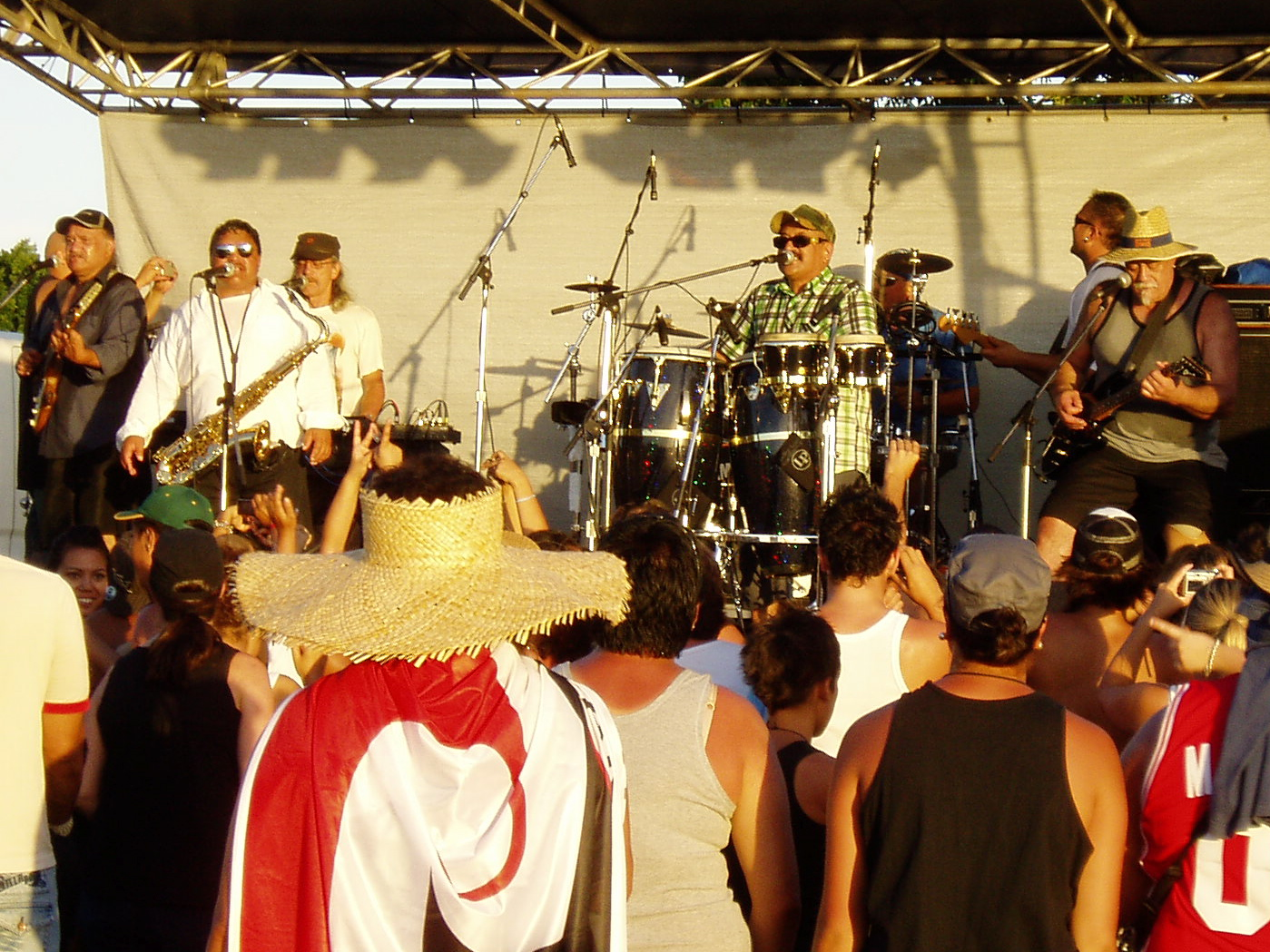
- Herbs performing on the Gold Coast, Queensland, Australia in February, 2009

Background information
- Origin: Auckland, New Zealand
- Genre: Pacific reggae
- Years active: 1978–present
- Members: Walter Bianco; Leyton Greening; Kaitapu Monga
- Past members: See Past members
- Website: http://www.glenmoffatt.com/herbs.htm

Herbs are a New Zealand reggae group founded in 1978. Since its foundation Herbs has been multi-ethnic in membership and featured Samoans, Tongans, Cook Islanders, New Zealand Europeans and Māori members. Herbs was led by singer-guitarist Dilworth Karaka, the main founding member who remained with the band since its inception, until his death in March 2026.

The 11th inductees into the New Zealand Music Hall of Fame, were once described as "New Zealand's most soulful, heartfelt and consistent contemporary musical voice". It has been said their debut EP What's Be Happen? "set a standard for Pacific reggae which has arguably never been surpassed".

== Politics ==
The band has always been political, with links to the Polynesian Panthers and the cover of What's Be Happen (released during the 1981 Springbok tour) being an aerial photo of police action at Bastion Point in 1978. As well as race relations, the band took a strong stance on nuclear weapons in the Pacific with "French Letter".

== History ==
Herbs produced a stream of reggae hits with some of the country's top talent. In the 1980s and the first half of the '90s, Herbs had 10 top 20 singles hits. Herbs also worked alongside UB40, Taj Mahal, Billy Preston, Neil Sedaka, Tina Turner, Neil Young, George Benson, Joe Walsh and Stevie Wonder.

Herbs' music is upbeat and clear in its messages. Their 1982 New Zealand hit "French Letter", which spent 11 weeks on the charts, expressed New Zealand's anti-nuclear stance. Fourteen years later, it was re-recorded to garner support for the prevention of nuclear testing at Mururoa. Similarly, "No Nukes (The Second Letter)", "Nuclear Waste" and "Light of the Pacific" expressed much the same sentiment.

Herbs' third release and first full album Long Ago, which featured the 1984 single of the same name, was produced by well-known New Zealand bass player Billy Kristian. In 1986, former Be-Bop Deluxe bassist/vocalist Charlie Tumahai joined the group, having been a session musician for various international acts.

In 1986, "Slice of Heaven" with Dave Dobbyn reached number one on both the New Zealand and Australian charts. In 1989 they played on Tim Finn's hit "Parihaka" and in 1992 Annie Crummer fronted the hit single "See What Love Can Do."

Around this time the band forged into producing, providing instrumentation for Samoan singing sensation John Parker. The album titled Another Girl produced a local hit, a reggae-funk inspired cover of the Maori folk song "E Papa".

In 1989, the band was assisted by Eagles member Joe Walsh, who produced, played slide guitar and sang on the band's Homegrown album, which featured a cover of "Walk Away Renee", originally recorded by The Left Banke. Walsh announced he had joined Herbs, but the union lasted less than a year. Walsh gives credit to the members taking him to 'the ruins at Hawke's Bay', where he had 'a moment of clarity' – for inspiring him to pursue sobriety.

They also provided two songs to the 1990 film, The Shrimp on the Barbie: A cover of the Peggy Lee song "Mañana (Is Good Enough for Me)" and "Listen". "Homegrown" from their 1990 album of the same name is featured on the soundtrack of Once Were Warriors.

Herbs are considered pioneers of the Pacific reggae sound, having paved the way for contemporary New Zealand reggae groups such as Fat Freddy's Drop, Katchafire, The Black Seeds, and Trinity Roots.

Although their last album of new material was released in 1990, Herbs still perform in New Zealand and Australia, with guitarist Dilworth Karaka the last remaining member of the original line-up that released What's Be Happen? in 1981.

Percussionist Thomas Nepia died in February 2018, following a battle with pancreatic cancer. Guitarist Tama Renata died in November that same year. Keyboardist Tama Lundon, who had played in the group since 1983, died in August 2025. And Dilworth Karaka, the primary founding member who remained with the band since its inception, died on 7 March 2026 aged 75.

== Members ==
=== Current members ===
- Walter Bianco — saxophone, flute, vocals (1999-2005, 2012-)
- Leyton Greening — drums (2001-2012, 2012-)
- Kaitapu Monga — bass guitar, vocals (2008-)

=== Past members ===
Deceased members are denoted with a cross (†).

- Dilworth Karaka (†) – vocals, guitar (1978-2026; died 2026)
- Toni Fonoti – vocals, percussion (1978-1982)
- Spencer Fusimalohi – vocals, guitar (1978-1983)
- Fred Faleauto (†) – vocals, drums (1978-1988; died 2001)
- Dave Pou – bass guitar (1978-1979)
- John Berkley – bass guitar (1980-1981)
- Phil Toms – vocals, bass guitar (1981-1982)
- Alan Foulkes – percussion (1982)
- Jack Allen – vocals, bass guitar (1982-1985)
- Tama Lundon (†) — vocals, keyboards (1983-2025; died 2025)
- Maurice Watene – vocals, saxophone (1983-1995, 2008-2012)
- Carl Perkins (†) – vocals, percussion (1983-1985; died 2018)
- Willie Hona (†) – vocals, guitar (1983-1988; died 2024)
- Thom Nepia (†) - vocals, percussion (1985-1992, 1995-2017; died 2018)
- Charles Tumahai (†) – vocals, bass guitar (1986-1995; died 1995)
- Gordon Joll – drums (1988-1993, 2010-2012)
- Joe Walsh – vocals, guitar, production (1988-1989)
- Tama Renata (†) – vocals, guitar (1992-2018; died 2018)
- Kristen Hapi – drums (1993-1995)
- Juanito Muzzio – percussion (1993-1997)
- Grant Pukeroa – vocals, drums (1995-1998)
- Max Hohepa – vocals, bass guitar (1996-2005)
- Lionel Nelson – vocals (2005)
- Ned Webster – drums (2005)
- Ryan Monga – drums (2008-2009)

== Discography ==
=== Albums ===
Title	Details	Peak chart positions
Title	Details	NZ
What's Be Happen?	Released: July 1981; Label: Warrior (Z 20012); Format: LP	40
Light of the Pacific	Released: March 1983; Label: Warrior (WAR 2005); Format: LP, cassette	49
Long Ago	Released: October 1984; Label: Warrior (WAR 2007); Format: LP, cassette	39
Sensitive to a Smile	Released: June 1987; Label: Warrior (WAR 2008); Format: LP, cassette, CD	10
Homegrown	Released: September 1990; Label: Tribal (9031727721–1); Format: LP, CD	—
"—" denotes a recording that did not chart or was not released in that territory.

=== Compilation albums ===
Title	Details	Peak chart positions
Title	Details	NZ
13 Years of Herbs: The Best of	Released: 1993; Label: Warner Music NZ (4509941522); Format: CD, cassette	14
Listen: The Very Best of	Released: 2001; Label: Warner Music NZ (0927419502); Format: CD, cassette	1
Lights of the Pacific: The Very Best of Herbs	Released: 22 November 2008; Label: Warner Music NZ (5186511252); Format: CD, digital download	8

=== Box sets ===
Title	Details
Herbs	Released: 25 August 2023; Label: Warrior; Details: 5×LP (What's Be Happen?, Light of the Pacific, Long Ago, Sensitive to a Smile, Homegrown)

=== Singles ===
Title	Year	Peak chart positions	Album
Title	Year	NZ	Album
"French Letter"	1982	11	Light of the Pacific
"Jah's Son"	1982	15	Light of the Pacific
"Long Ago"	1984	22	Long Ago
"Nuclear Waste"	1985	32	Long Ago
"Slice of Heaven" (as Dave Dobbyn with Herbs)	1986	1	Footrot Flats: The Dog's Tale
"Sensitive to a Smile"	1987	9	Sensitive to a Smile
"Rust in Dust"	1987	11	Sensitive to a Smile
"Listen"	1988	7	Sensitive to a Smile
"No Nukes (The Second Letter to France)"	1989	48	Sensitive to a Smile
"Parihaka" (as Tim Finn feat. Herbs)	1989	6	Tim Finn
"Homegrown"	1991	41	Homegrown
"See What Love Can Do" (as Annie Crummer feat. Herbs)	1992	3	Language
"Till We Kissed" (as Herbs feat. Ray Columbus)	1993	26	Non-album singles
"Good for Life" (as Herbs and Friends)	1994	—	Non-album singles
"French Letter '95"	1995	9	Non-album singles
"—" denotes a recording that did not chart or was not released in that territory.

== Critical reception and awards ==
=== RIANZ Awards ===
The New Zealand Music Awards are awarded annually by the RIANZ in New Zealand.

Year	Award	Work	Result
1983	Album of the Year	Light of the Pacific	Nominated
1983	Top Group of the Year		Nominated
1985	Album of the Year	Long Ago	Nominated
1985	Polynesian Album of the Year	Long Ago	Won
1986	International Achievement		Won
1987	Album of the Year	Sensitive to a Smile	Won
1987	Best Male Vocalist	Thom Nepia (Herbs)	Nominated
1987	Best Group		Nominated
1987	Best Polynesian Album	E Papa – Jah Knows	Won
1987	Best Songwriter	Charles Tumahai / Dilworth Karaka – "Sensitive to a Smile"	Won
1988	Best Male Vocalist		Nominated
1988	Best Group		Won
1990	Best Polynesian Album	Homegrown	Won
1996	Single of the Year	"French Letter '95"	Nominated

=== Aotearoa Music Awards ===
The Aotearoa Music Awards (previously known as New Zealand Music Awards (NZMA)) are an annual awards night celebrating excellence in New Zealand music and have been presented annually since 1965.

Year	Nominee / work	Award	Result	Ref.
2012	Herbs	New Zealand Music Hall of Fame	inductee	
