= Sensitive to a Smile (song) =

Herbs song

Single by Herbs

from the album Sensitive to a Smile
- B-side: "Station of Love"
- Released: 1987 (New Zealand)
- Recorded: 1987
- Genre: Reggae
- Length: 4:29
- Label: Warrior
- Songwriters: Dilworth Karaka; Charlie Tumahai; Todd Casella
- Producer: Billy Kristian

Herbs singles chronology
"Slice of Heaven (with Dave Dobbyn)" (1986)	"Sensitive to a Smile" (1987)	"Rust in Dust" (1987)

"Sensitive to a Smile" is a single from the New Zealand reggae band Herbs from the Sensitive to a Smile album. The single reached number 9 in the New Zealand chart.

== Background ==
"Sensitive to a Smile" was written by Dilworth Karaka and Charlie Tumahai with the American poet Todd Casella, who had moved to New Zealand and was a fan of the band. Karaka calls it "very much a family song".

The song and album were originally set to be released in 1986, but the success of the song "Slice of Heaven", that Herbs had recorded with Dave Dobbyn, meant that they held back the release of "Sensitive to a Smile" and the album.

== Music video ==
The video was made in Ruatoria so that the band could give support to the Rastafarian protests happening in the area. The video was shot by Lee Tamahori, the future director of Once Were Warriors.

== Awards and critical acclaim ==
At the 1987 New Zealand Music Awards, the single won the best video award and Charles Tumahai and Dilworth Karaka the best songwriter award.

In 2001, the song was voted 80th most popular New Zealand song as part of the APRA Best New Zealand Songs of All Time.

== Year-end charts ==
Chart (1987)	Position
New Zealand (Recorded Music NZ)	35

== Certifications ==
Region	Certification	Certified units/sales
New Zealand (RMNZ)	Platinum	30,000^{‡}
^{‡} Sales+streaming figures based on certification alone.

== Aotearoa Reggae All Stars version ==
"Sensitive to a Smile"

Single by Aotearoa Reggae All Stars
- Released: 21 June 2013
- Recorded: York Street Studios, Auckland, 2013
- Genre: Reggae
- Length: 4:05
- Label: Illegal Musik
- Songwriters: Dilworth Karaka; Charlie Tumahai; Todd Casella

In June 2013, a cover version of "Sensitive to a Smile" was released on iTunes by the Aotearoa Reggae All Stars, a supergroup of New Zealand reggae artists. It debuted at number 2 in the Official New Zealand Music Chart singles chart, and at number 1 in the Official New Zealand Music Chart. The single re-entered the New Zealand chart in February 2014 at number 30.

The song was released as a charity single, with proceeds benefiting the violence-free parenting advocacy charity Mana Ririki. The project was conceived by Avina Kelekolio of Tomorrow People and Rio Panapa of Sons of Zion. The group features Sons of Zion, Tomorrow People, Three Houses Down, House of Shem, Ria Hall, Majic Paora, Che Fu, Katchafire, 1814, Chad Chambers, NRG Rising and Tasty Brown.

The single release was accompanied by a behind-the-scenes documentary broadcast on Māori Television.

=== Chart performance ===
Chart (2013)	Peak position
New Zealand (RMNZ)	2
New Zealand singles (RMNZ)	1

== Hollie Smith version ==
In 2008, to celebrate the song's 20th anniversary, Herbs' 30th anniversary and the release of their career best-of album, the New Zealand singer Hollie Smith recorded a version of the song with the Mount Roskill Primary School choir. The song peaked at number 33 in the New Zealand singles chart. The song was included on Herbs' 2008 best-of album, Lights of the Pacific - The Very Best of Herbs.
