= Slice of Heaven =

1986 single by Herbs and Dave Dobbyn

Single by Dave Dobbyn with Herbs

from the album Footrot Flats: The Dog's ~~Tail~~ Tale soundtrack
- B-side: "Slice of Heaven" (Music mix)
- Released: 12 September 1986
- Studio: Marmalade
- Length: 4:38
- Songwriter: Dave Dobbyn
- Producers: Dave Dobbyn, Bruce Lynch

Dave Dobbyn singles chronology
"She Loves Me Back" (1985)	"Slice of Heaven" (1986)	"You Oughta Be in Love" (1986)

Herbs singles chronology
"Nuclear Waste" (1985)	"Slice of Heaven" (1986)	"Sensitive to a Smile" (1987)

Audio sample
- file; help

Music video
- "Slice of Heaven" at NZ On Screen

"Slice of Heaven" is a single by New Zealand singer-songwriter Dave Dobbyn with the band Herbs, released in 1986 on the soundtrack of the animated motion picture, Footrot Flats: The Dog's ~~Tail~~ Tale. The single reached No. 1 on the New Zealand Singles Chart for eight weeks and on the Australian Singles Chart for four weeks. It appears on Dobbyn's 1988 album, Loyal.

== Background ==
Dobbyn was writing in Sydney when he was given the opportunity to compose for the Footrot Flats film. He had previously used the line "Slice of Heaven" in the DD Smash album The Optimist, specifically "Don't Give Up" and chose to revisit it. He brought in Herbs to sing in the background based on his childhood experiences of Pacific gospel choirs.

== Composition ==
The song incorporates a synthesised Japanese flute made with an E-mu Emulator II.

== Reception ==
The song gained huge exposure in Australasia through the Footrot Flats trailer being shown before the popular Crocodile Dundee film, leading to high radio play before the single had been released. According to Dobbyn, one New Zealand rock station producer refused to play the song as they considered it "underproduced", but were forced to reconsider due to huge listener demand for the song. The song spent eight weeks at No. 1 in New Zealand and four weeks at No. 1 in Australia. It has been praised for the combination of Dobbyn's and Herbs' vocals. "Slice of Heaven" was awarded Best Song at the 1986 New Zealand Music Awards.

== Music video ==
The video features Dobbyn, Herbs and dancers recording the song, interspersed with clips from the Footrot Flats film. The music video was recorded in Wellington's Marmalade Studios. Notably, due to time constraints, the clips of the singers performing are from their live recording takes rather than being a recreation.

== Alternate versions ==
An alternate version of the song featured in the closing credits of the Footrot Flats movie, featuring less emphasis on the Herbs vocals and more focus on the percussion and bass of the song. In 2021, Dobbyn released a version in the Māori language titled "Hine Ruhi". In 2023, Australian-New Zealand band Coterie performed a cover of the song during their 2023 Australasian tour. After a strong response from fans, Coterie contacted Dobbyn to collaborate on recording a new version of the song, which was released as a single in September 2023. This version reached number four on the New Zealand artists singles chart.

== Legacy ==
"Slice of Heaven" was included in Nature's Best—New Zealand's Top 30 Songs of All Time, coming in at No. 7. It was voted No. 1 in 2009 by C4 viewers as New Zealand's favourite song and is often considered an unofficial national anthem of New Zealand, especially after its usage in New Zealand tourism ads in the 1980s and 1990s. It has also become synonymous with the Footrot Flats film.

== Charts ==
=== Weekly charts ===
Chart (1986–1987)	Peak position
Australia (Australian Music Report)	1
New Zealand (Recorded Music NZ)	1

=== Year-end charts ===
Chart (1986)	Position
New Zealand (RIANZ)	3
Chart (1987)	Position
Australia (Australian Music Report)	4

== Certifications ==
Region	Certification	Certified units/sales
New Zealand (RMNZ)	7× Platinum	210,000^{‡}
New Zealand (RMNZ) Coterie version	Gold	15,000^{‡}
^{‡} Sales+streaming figures based on certification alone.

== In popular culture ==
During the 2026 FIFA World Cup, "Slice of Heaven" was the goal song for New Zealand.
