= Charlie Tumahai =

New Zealand singer, bass player and songwriter

Background information
- Born: 14 January 1949; Ōrākei, Auckland, New Zealand
- Died: 21 December 1995 (aged 46) Auckland, New Zealand
- Genres: Progressive rock, reggae
- Occupations: Musician, songwriter
- Years active: 1964–1995
- Label: EMI

Charles Turu Tumahai (14 January 1949 – 21 December 1995) was a New Zealand singer, bass player and songwriter who was a member of several noted rock groups in New Zealand, Australia and the UK. He is best known internationally as the bassist and backing vocalist in Bill Nelson's Be-Bop Deluxe.

Tumahai was born in Ōrākei, Auckland, New Zealand, where he began his music career before moving to Australia in the late 1960s. He was a member of several notable Australian bands including Chain, Healing Force, Friends and Mississippi (which later evolved into Little River Band). Tumahai traveled to the UK with Mississippi in 1974 and remained there when Mississippi broke up. Later that year he joined Be-Bop Deluxe, with whom he played and recorded until 1978, when he joined The Dukes. In 1980 he joined Tandoori Cassette, a group featuring ex-members of Nazareth, Jethro Tull and The Sensational Alex Harvey Band, however this group did not make any recordings except a single "Angel Talk" c/w Third World Briefcases.

He returned to New Zealand in 1985 and joined the popular New Zealand reggae band Herbs. As well as music he became involved in Maori affairs, working as a voluntary member of a scheme set up to assist young Maori offenders in Auckland. He was also developing plans for an arts programme for Maori prisoners and for exploring new ways he could help young Maori people connect with their culture. He performed in the 1994 film Once Were Warriors.

He died suddenly after suffering a heart attack while working at the Auckland District Court on 21 December 1995, at age 46.

Tumahai was the subject of a 2010 television documentary.

== Equipment ==
- During his days with Be-Bop Deluxe, he used Fender Telecaster and Precision basses.
- From the late 1980s onwards, he became known for playing a black copy of a Steinberger XL2A made by Cort.
