= Pacific reggae =

Music genre

Pacific reggae or Island reggae is a style of reggae music found in the Pacific. This style is found in Polynesia (including New Zealand and Hawaii), and Melanesia (including Papua New Guinea and the Solomon Islands). Within this genre there are differing styles, for example between the New Zealand reggae sound (such as Katchafire), and that found in the Pacific Islands. According to Herbs co-founder Dilworth Karaka, it is a phrase UB40 came up with.

Pacific reggae differs from Jamaican reggae in the use of instruments such as the ukulele, traditional wooden drums, keyboard synthesizers and other Pacific sounds including Māori instruments. Reggae in the Pacific is not typically Rastafarian; in the Pacific Islands, songs are often remakes of traditional songs e.g. Small Axe's remake of Kalipolina. New Zealand reggae has Māori influences.

Notable Pacific reggae groups include Herbs, who originally played a more Jamaican reggae style. They were subsequently encouraged by Bob Marley when he toured New Zealand in 1979, to explore and develop the Pacific reggae sound.

Other notable groups include Three Houses Down, BrownHill, Kolohe Kai, Rebel Souljahz and artists such as Fiji, Swiss, Majic and Samoan descent Hawaiian based J Boog.
