= Horomona Horo =

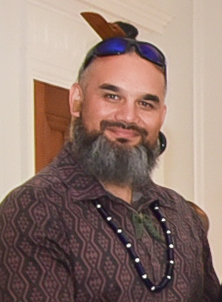
- Horo in 2020

Background information
- Born: 1978 (age 47–48); New Zealand
- Genres: Māori, roots revival, classical
- Occupations: Composer, musician
- Instrument: Taonga pūoro
- Years active: 2001–present
- Labels: Atoll, Rattle Records
- Website: www.horomonahoro.com

Horomona Horo (born 1978) is a New Zealand Māori musician and composer. He is a practitioner of taonga pūoro, the collective term for the traditional musical instruments of the Māori, which include an array of flutes, trumpets and percussive instruments.

== Career ==
Horo was mentored by the late Dr Hirini Melbourne and Dr Richard Nunns and was the winner of the inaugural Dynasty Heritage Concerto Competition in 2001. He has represented New Zealand music in Europe, Asia, South America and Oceania including engagements with the Weimaraer Staatskapelle Orchestra, touring Italy with Canti Maori opera and performing as a guest artist at the Battle of Passchendaele 90th Commemorations in Belgium. In 2009 Horo was described as the "master of his generation" by Maori cultural magazine, Mana and has collaborated with New Zealand composers such as Gareth Farr for the Voices New Zealand Chamber Choir and Victoria Kelly for the NZTrio. In 2010 Horo collaborated with UK film and concert composer, Paul Lewis (composer) on the Legends of Rotorua project for chamber ensemble, story teller and taonga pūoro. The forty-five-minute composition tells two of the great legends of the Te Arawa people and was premiered at the Rotorua Festival of the Arts in February 2011. Horo is the Maori consultant to Choirs NZ and taonga puoro musician.

In 2012 Horomona along with classical guitarist Joshua Henare Rogers formed Waiora who were subsequently invited to perform at the World Music Expo WOMEX. Waiora was the first group from New Zealand to be selected to participate in the coveted showcase in over a decade, showcasing taonga pūoro for the first time on a world meeting platform. The following year, he composed the taonga pūoro parts for New Zealand's first World War I commemorative work, Requiem for the Fallen, written for the Voices New Zealand Choir and New Zealand String Quartet and performed at the New Zealand International Festival.

== Discography ==
- Te Puaotanga O Te Ao: Debut album from the trio Waiora - Orowaru Arts & Minaaka Ltd 2015
- He Rangi Paihuarere: A Tribute to the late Dr Hirini Melbourne Various Artists Rattle 2012
- Nga Tae: Nga Tae Rattle 2012
- Quays Luca Manghi Atoll Records 2012
- He Ihimaera: Compilation | Witi Ihimaera 2011
- Toru: Martin Lodge Atoll Records 2011
- Tohu: Maisey Rika 2009
- Solid Territory: Indigenous Hip Hop & Roots 2008
- WHA: Moana and the Tribe 2008
- Aurora Australis: Asia Pacific Festival Atoll Records 2007
- Mokomoko: Carol Storey 2007
- Based on a True Story: Fat Freddys Drop 2005
