= Oceania (Oceania album) =

1999 album by Oceania

Studio album by Oceania
- Released: September 1999
- Genres: World music; Māori music; Pop; House
- Length: 59:06
- Label: Point Music
- Producer: Jaz Coleman

Oceania chronology
Oceania (1999)	Oceania II (2003)

Singles from Oceania
- 1. "Kotahitanga" Released: October 1999; 2. "Pukaea" Released: 2000

Oceania is the debut studio album by New Zealand musical act Oceania, a collaboration between New Zealand vocalist Hinewehi Mohi and English producer Jaz Coleman. Sung in Māori, the album is a blend of Māori music traditions and instruments with 1990s house and pop.

== Background ==
Hinewehi Mohi debuted as a solo musician in the early 1990s, while primarily working as a Television New Zealand producer. She met English producer Jaz Coleman of the band Killing Joke after he moved to New Zealand to become the composer-in-residence for the New Zealand Symphony Orchestra. Mohi sung at a tapu lifting ceremony for a recording studio, during which she impressed Coleman by her vocal ability.

Mohi developed songs alongside Jaz Coleman, often developing songs around an initial chorus melody composed by Mohi. Many of the songs on the album are inspired by the early life of Mohi's daughter Hineraukatauri, who was born with cerebral palsy. No instrument samples were used on the album, with all instruments performed live in studio sessions. Many taonga pūoro performed by traditional musicians were featured in the sessions, including performances by Hirini Melbourne. The name of the project, Oceania, was chosen by record executives, who wanted a name that European listeners could relate to. Mohi herself had wanted a Te Re Māori name for the project. Originally the album was planned for release in 1998, however was delayed due to the takeover of the PolyGram label by Universal Music.

== Release ==
Mohi arrived in Europe in August 1999 to promote the album, performing a promotional tour in Germany and the United Kingdom, and appearing on the BBC Breakfast. The album was promoted by the single "Kotahitanga (Union)", which was used to promote the All Blacks during the 1999 Rugby World Cup. During the event's opening ceremony, Mohi was invited to sing the national anthem of New Zealand. Mohi decided to sing the anthem in Māori instead of English, which received wide backlash in the New Zealand press at the time.

The album was a commercial success in New Zealand, debuting at number 15 and immediately receiving a gold certification. The album peaked at number 14, and spent 18 weeks in the top 40 chart. Eventually, the album was certified double platinum. It was the first Māori language album to be released internationally. In 2000, the song "Pukaea" was released as the second single in Europe.

== Track listing ==
All tracks are written by Hinewehi Mohi, Jaz Coleman.

No.	Title	Length
1.	"Pukaea (The Trumpet)"	6:32
2.	"Kotahitanga (Union)"	4:41
3.	"Hautoa (Warrior)"	4:46
4.	"Hineraukatauri (Goddess of Music)"	4:55
5.	"He Tangata (People)"	5:37
6.	"Kihikihi (Cicada)"	6:23
7.	"Haera Ra (Farewell)"	5:35
8.	"Pepepe (The Moth)"	6:17
9.	"Tino Rangatiratanga (Self-determination)"	6:11
10.	"Hautoa (Warrior)" (Beatmasters 7" Mix)	4:41
11.	"Kotahitanga (Union)" (Beatmasters 7" Mix)	3:28
Total length:		59:06

== Personnel ==
Credits are adapted from the album's liner notes.

=== Musicians ===
- Jaz Coleman – producer, writer, ocarina, classical guitar, keyboards, bass
- Hinewehi Mohi – vocals, backing vocals
- Livingi Asitamoni – banjo
- Inia Eruera – haka vocals
- Tumanako Farrell – backing vocals, haka vocals
- Rangiiria Hedley – taonga pūoro
- Billy Laing – guitar
- Martin Lee – oboe
- Bernard Makoare – taonga pūoro
- Marcelle Mallette – violin
- Hirini Melbourne – taonga pūoro
- Angie Smith – backing vocals, haka vocals
- Matai Smith – haka vocals
- Reo Takiwa – backing vocals, haka vocals
- Tawhao Tioke – Hawaiian guitar
- Richard Wehi – haka vocals

=== Technical ===
- Paddy Free – programming
- Philip Glass – executive producer
- Andy Green – assistant engineer
- Mark Haley – programming
- Rory Johnston – executive producer
- Kurt Munkacsi – executive producer
- Hugo Nicolson – mixing (tracks 1–3, 5–11)
- Jony Rockstar – programming
- Jeremy Shaw – programming
- Nigel Stone – recording (tracks 1–9)
- Jazz Summers – executive producer
- Keith Uddlin – assistant engineer
- Wayne Wilkins – string recording (track 4)

== Charts ==
Chart performance for Oceania
Charts (1999)	Peak position
New Zealand Albums (RMNZ)	12

== Certifications ==
Region	Certification	Certified units/sales
New Zealand (RMNZ)	2× Platinum	30,000^{^}
^{^} Shipments figures based on certification alone.

== Release history ==
Release dates and formats for Chromatica
Region	Date	Format(s)	Label(s)	Ref.=
New Zealand	September 1999	CD	Point Music	
United Kingdom	11 October 1999	CD	Point Music	
Japan	1 December 1999	CD	Mercury Music Entertainment	
