= Waiora =

New Zealand music trio

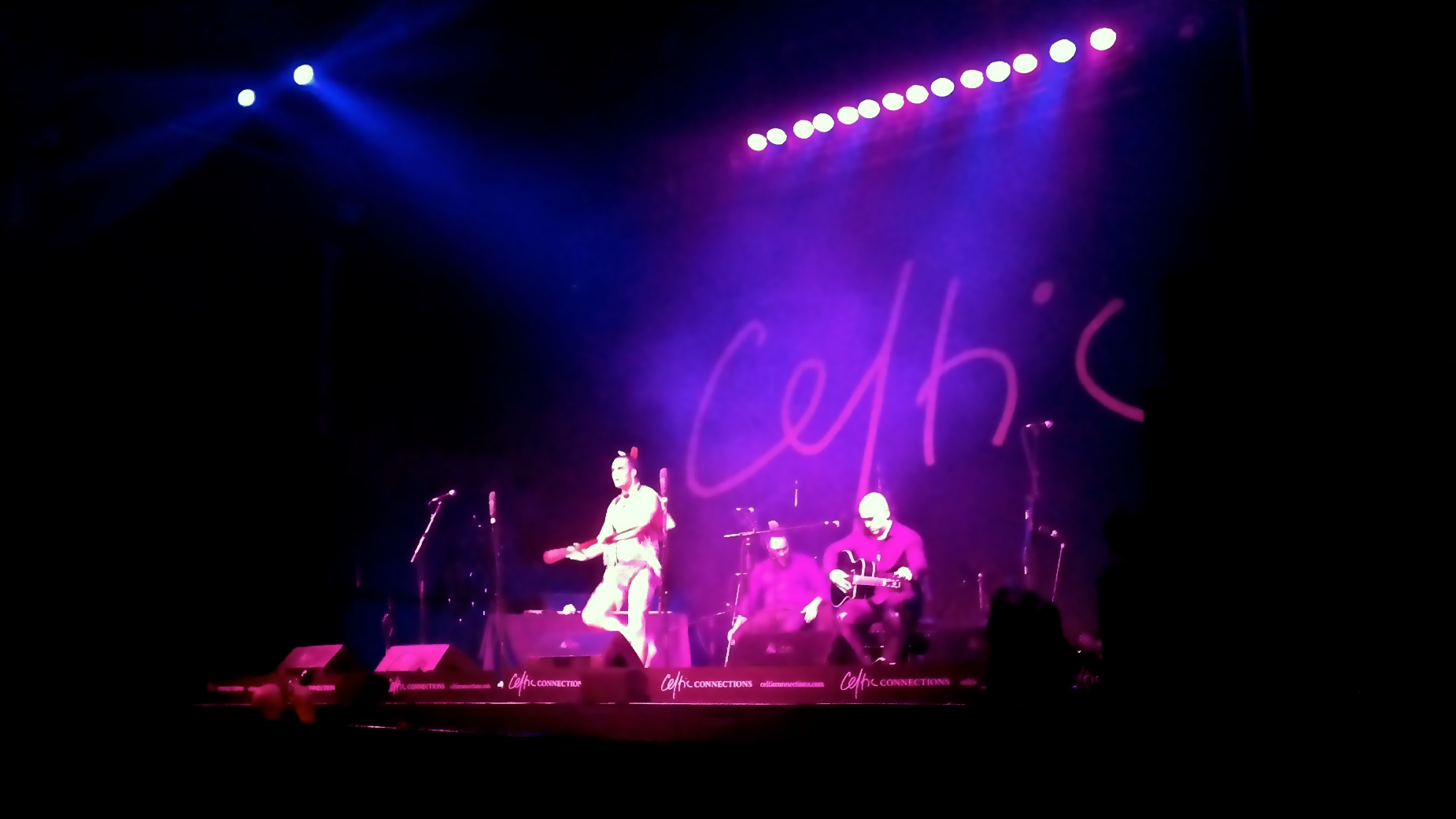
- Performing at Celtic Connections in Scotland 2015

Background information
- Origin: Bay of Plenty, New Zealand
- Genres: Ethnic, World music, cultural
- Years active: 2013–present
- Label: Orowaru Arts
- Members: Korey Atama; Horomona Horo; Joshua Henare Rogers

Waiora is a trio of indigenous Māori musicians from New Zealand.

The three members of Waiora are Horomona Horo, Korey Atama, and Joshua Henare Rogers. The musical performances of Waiora are centred upon the ancient cultural practices of the Maori people and their musical instruments commonly referred to as taonga pūoro. Their performances combine elements of traditional war dances or haka, melodic songs with lyrics written in the Maori language, and instrumental music that fuses the mystical sounds of taonga pūoro with guitar and percussive instruments from around the globe.

When the group was formed in early 2013 Waiora was originally a duo with the founding members being Horomona Horo and Joshua Henare Rogers. In March 2014 Korey Atama joined the group just before Waiora's performance at WOMAD Taranaki.

Historically the concept of Waiora was formed many years earlier in 2002 at a taonga pūoro workshop held at the Heitiki Art Gallery in Rotorua, New Zealand. Taonga pūoro expert Richard Nunns and his protégé Horomona Horo were tutoring the workshop. Classical guitarist Joshua Henare Rogers had decided to attend the workshop to learn more about the instruments to help with his composition of the seminal opus for taonga puūoro and classical guitar 'He Karanga Ki Te Ao' premiered three years later in Whakatane.

== Members ==
- Korey Atama - percussion and vocals
- Horomona Horo - taonga pūoro and vocals
- Joshua Henare Rogers - guitars and vocals

== Performances ==
- May 2013 tour of Slovakia, Ireland & Great Britain
- October 2013 tour of Scotland, Wales & Great Britain
- September 2013 performances at the Singapore Grand Prix
- March 2014 performance at WOMAD - Taranaki, New Zealand
- January 2015 performances at Celtic Connections

== Discography ==
Albums

- Te Puaotanga O Te Ao, 2015 (Orowaru Arts & Minaaka LTD)
