= Aroha Yates-Smith =

New Zealand performer and academic

- Born: Greta Regina Aroha Yates-Smith
- Education: University of Waikato
- Awards: Te Rangi Hiroa Medal
- Scientific career
- Workplaces: University of Waikato
- Thesis: Hine! E Hine! Rediscovering the Feminine in Māori Spirituality (1999)
- Doctoral students: Priscilla Wehi

Greta Regina Aroha Yates-Smith, known as Aroha Yates-Smith, is a New Zealand performer and academic, who affiliates to Te Arawa, Tainui, Takitimu, Horouta, and Mataatua. She is known for her research into Māori female deities.

== Early life and education ==
Yates-Smith grew up in Rotorua. As a child, she had wanted to know why there was a lack of stories about female Māori goddesses. Yates Smith completed a Masters degree and taught the Māori language before undertaking a PhD to look for lost stories of Māori female deities. She completed her thesis, titled Hine! e Hine!: rediscovering the feminine in Maori spirituality, at the University of Waikato in 1998. The thesis examines the role of atua wāhine (female Māori goddesses) in the Māori world view, and the marginalisation of the feminine, both past and present.

== Career ==
Yates-Smith became Dean at the University of Waikato's School of Māori and Pacific Development (Te Pua Wānanga ki te Ao). Her research interests have included Māori spirituality, traditional Māori medicine. She is also interested in Māori women’s arts and crafts, and the tradition of karetao (Māori puppetry), which she hopes to revive.

Yates-Smith curated an exhibition, including her own work, at the Rotorua Museum in 2000. The exhibition, Hine! E Hine!, was funded by the Arts Council Te Waka Toi (now Creative New Zealand), and explored the legacy of Māori women. She has featured on a number of recordings, including collaborating with Hirini Melbourne and Richard Nunns on the DVD Te Hekenga-ā-Rangi in 2003. The soundtrack was later released as a CD titled Karanga Te Po - Karanga Te Ao, and featured traditional Māori musical instruments taonga pūoro. She has composed work and done vocal work including the DVD Tau te Mauri Breath of Peace, which won the Sonja Davies Peace Award in 2005, and the 2007 film He Oranga He Oranga Healing Journeys, which received a Commended World Peace Film Award at the World Peace Film and Music Festival in Lucknow, India.

Yates-Smith's work was the inspiration for the video game MāoriGrl by her daughter Kahurangiariki Smith, and the digital exhibition of the same name held in the Depot Artspace in Devonport in 2018. The exhibition reinterpreted the story of Hine-tītama /Hine-nui-te-pō, the woman who became the goddess of death in Māori mythology.

== Honours and awards ==
In 1992 Yates-Smith won a Fulbright Scholarship to visit the East–West Center at the University of Hawai'i in Manoa.

In 2003 Yates-Smith was awarded the Te Rangi Hiroa Medal, which is awarded for "current issues in cultural diversity and cohesion", for her doctoral thesis. In 2017, she was selected as one of the Royal Society Te Apārangi's 150 women in 150 words.

In 2024 the Creative New Zealand Te Tohu Aroha mō Te Arikinui Dame Te Atairangikaahu Supreme Award was awarded to Yates-Smith at the annual Te Waka Toi Awards.

== Family ==
Yates-Smith lives in Hamilton with her husband, Lloyd Smith, and three children.

== Selected works ==
- Te Hekenga-ā-Rangi (in undetermined language), Performer: Hirini Melbourne, Richard Nunns, Aroha Yates-Smith, Steve Garden, New Zealand: Rattle, 2003, OCLC 155911921, Wikidata Q105091327
- Tau te mauri = breath of peace (in undetermined language), 2005, OCLC 166307286, Wikidata Q105091328
- Gillian Whitehead; Benjamin Russell Hoadley; Aroha Yates-Smith; Richard Nunns; Janet Roddick; Emma Sayers; Stephen De Pledge; Tuhonohono (Musical group) (2004), Arapātiki (in undetermined language), OCLC 906202193, Wikidata Q105091325
- He oranga he oranga = Healing journeys (in undetermined language), 2007, OCLC 183343941, Wikidata Q105091329
