= AEIOU (Moana and the Moahunters song) =

Single by Moana and the Moahunters

from the album Tahi
- Released: April 1991
- Genre: Dance; funk; hip hop
- Length: 4:02
- Label: Southside
- Songwriters: Mina Ripia; Moana Maniapoto; Teremoana Rapley
- Producers: Stuart Pearce; John Diamond

Moana and the Moahunters singles chronology
| "Black Pearl" (1990) | "AEIOU" (1991) | "Peace, Love and Family" / "Kua Makona" (1993) |

"AEIOU" - sometimes subtitled "Akona Te Reo" ["learn the (Māori) language"] - is a song by New Zealand musical group Moana and the Moahunters, released in April 1991 through Southside Records as the second single from their debut album Tahi (1993).

== Development and composition ==
While the song is sometimes solely credited to group member Mina Ripia, group leader Moana Maniapoto has alternatively commented that it was written by the entire group, with herself and Teremoana Rapley contributing verses around Ripia's original radio jingle chorus. Maniapoto has described the song's purpose as "blatant propaganda" and a "call to action," to both enforce the proper pronunciation of Māori vowels into the minds of Pākeha and encourage Māori youth to join the Māori language revival and learn te reo Māori. Its message has also been interpreted as a broader one aimed at all races to "get back to your roots."

The track is a dance song with a funk backing, and includes a rap by Rapley in its bridge. It was mixed by Mark Tierney of Strawpeople at Lab Studios in Auckland and produced by Stuart Pearce and John Diamond.

== Release ==
Upon its release, "AEIOU" became the first song to receive a music video funded by NZ On Air. The Kerry Brown-directed video includes cameos from singer Mika X, rap duo MC OJ & Rhythm Slave, actor Temuera Morrison, and Maniapoto's father, among others. It was filmed at Albert Park, St. Stephen's College in Bombay, and the home of Brown and his then-wife Rosanna Raymond (who served as the video's stylist). However, the track only reached No. 31 on the New Zealand charts in spite of the No. 2 peak of Moana and the Moahunters' previous single, "Black Pearl." Maniapoto has stated that radio stations considered the song to not "fit the format" and ignored it.

== Track listings ==
- New Zealand promo CD
1. AEIOU (Akona Te Reo) (radio mix)
2. AEIOU (Akona Te Reo) (instrumental)
- New Zealand 12-inch single
1. AEIOU (Akona Te Reo) (dance mix)
2. AEIOU (Akona Te Reo) (radio mix)
3. AEIOU (Akona Te Reo) (instrumental)

== Charts ==
| Chart (1991) | Peak position |
|---|---|
| New Zealand (Recorded Music NZ) | 31 |
