= Hinewehi Mohi =

New Zealand musician and producer

Dame Hinewehi Mohi DNZM
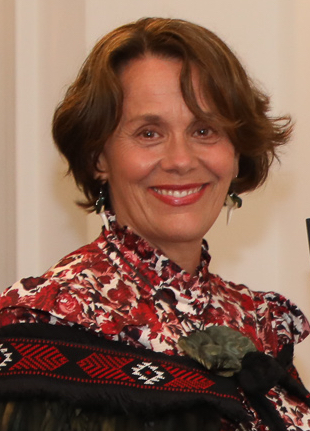
- Mohi in 2021

Background information
- Born: 1964 (age 61–62); Waipukurau, New Zealand
- Instrument: Vocals
- Years active: 1986–present

Dame Hinewehi Mohi DNZM (born 1964) is a New Zealand musician and producer, best known for her double-platinum album Oceania (1999) and its lead single "Kotahitanga (Union)", performing the New Zealand National Anthem in Māori during the 1999 Rugby World Cup, and as a producer for the 2019 Māori language compilation album Waiata / Anthems.

As a television producer, Mohi has worked to produce television programmes such as Mōteatea and Marae DIY.

== Early life ==
Mohi was born in Waipukurau in the Hawke's Bay Region, New Zealand, and is of Ngāti Kahungunu and Ngāi Tūhoe descent. She attended St Joseph's Māori Girls' College in Taradale, New Zealand, later receiving a BA in Māori from the University of Waikato in 1985, where she was heavily involved with kapa haka groups. At the University of Waikato, Mohi was mentored by musician and lecturer Hirini Melbourne.

== Career ==
Mohi began working as a television producer in the mid-1980s, focusing on Māori-related content. In 1992, Mohi released her debut single "Kia Ū", a Māori language song describing the mistreatment of Māori in New Zealand. Mohi's first album, Oceania, was released in 1999, and was a success, becoming double platinum certified in New Zealand. The album, a collaboration with English producer Jaz Coleman, blended Māori language lyrics, melodies and taonga pūoro (traditional instruments) with a 1990s pop house sound. The album's success made Mohi, alongside Moana and the Moahunters, famous as one of the few musical acts who promoted a distinctively Māori form of popular music.

In 1999, Mohi performed the New Zealand National Anthem at the opening game of the 1999 Rugby World Cup. Mohi was asked to sing the anthem and she requested permission to sing it in both English and Māori but was told that she could only sing it in one language, with the unspoken expectation that it be performed in English. Mohi decided to sing the anthem in Māori instead, which received wide backlash in the New Zealand press at the time. Mohi was bemused by the reaction, after being immersed in spaces in New Zealand that had celebrated Māori culture. This proved to be a turning point, sparking a national conversation about cultural identity and the first language of New Zealand, and is the reason why the anthem has begun to be sung bilingually since the early 2000s.

In the early 2000s, Mohi co-founded the Raukatauri Music Therapy Centre with her husband George Bradfield. They set up the centre because of their daughter (who has cerebral palsy) and her experiences with music therapy in London. In 2004 Mohi set up the television production company Raukatauri Productions, which has produced shows such as Mōteatea and Marae DIY, which won the best reality show award at the 2007 Qantas Television Awards. In 2013, Mohi released Raukatauri – Te Puhi o Te Tangi, an album reimagining her songs in collaboration with the Auckland Chamber Orchestra.

Mohi produced and curated the 2019 album Waiata / Anthems, a compilation album released for te Wiki o te Reo Māori (Māori Language Week), where popular New Zealand musicians re-recorded their songs in Māori. The album debuted at number 1 on the Official New Zealand Music Chart. Due to the success of the album, the project was revived in 2021, becoming Waiata Anthems Week, an annual celebration of music recorded in Te Reo Māori.

As a member of APRA, Mohi mentors musicians to promote the development of Māori music. In her capacity as Apra Amcos Māori development leader Mohi led the project of Lorde's te Reo Māori EP Te Ao Mārama. Mohi sings on "Hua Pirau / Fallen Fruit".

== Honours and recognition ==
Mohi was appointed a Member of the New Zealand Order of Merit in the 2008 Birthday Honours for her services to Māori.

In 2015, Mohi was awarded the Distinguished Alumni Award by the University of Waikato. In 2016, Mohi received the Te Puni Kōkiri Te Reo Māori Champion Award at the Women in Film and Television New Zealand Awards. She was inducted into the New Zealand Hall of Fame for Women Entrepreneurs in 2020.

In the 2021 Queen's Birthday Honours, Mohi was promoted to Dame Companion of the New Zealand Order of Merit, for services to Māori, music and television.

Mohi was inducted into the New Zealand Music Hall of Fame and celebrated at the Aotearoa Music Awards on 30 May 2024, in recognition of her ongoing contributions to the revitalisation of te reo Māori.

== Personal life ==
Mohi's daughter was born in 1996. Mohi was diagnosed with breast cancer in 2011.

== Discography ==
=== Studio albums ===
List of studio albums, with selected chart positions and certifications
Title	Album details	Peak chart positions	Certifications
Title	Album details	NZ	Certifications
Oceania (among Oceania, with Jaz Coleman)	Released: September 1999; Label: Point Music, Universal Music; Format: CD	12	RMNZ: 2× Platinum
Oceania II (among Oceania, with Jaz Coleman)	Released: March 2003; Label: Universal; Format: CD	50	
Raukatauri – Te Puhi o Te Tangi	Released: 2013; Label: Raukatauri Productions; Format: CD, digital download	— (Note: Raukatauri – Te Puhi o Te Tangi did not enter the Official New Zealand Music Chart, but peaked at number 16 on the Top 20 NZ artists' albums chart.)	

=== Singles ===
Title	Year	Peak chart positions	Album
Title	Year	NZ	Album
"Kia Ū"	1992	—	Non-album singles
"The Myth"	1993	46	Non-album singles
"Kotahitanga" (among Oceania)	1999	—	Oceania
"Pukaea" (among Oceania)	2000	—	Oceania
"Anchor Me" (Note: Cover of The Mutton Birds' song for Greenpeace, to mark the twentieth anniversary of the bombing of the Rainbow Warrior.) (with Kirsten Morelle, Che Fu, Milan Borich, Adeaze, Hinewehi Mohi, David Atai and Donald McNulty)	2005	3	Non-album singles
"Matariki (Te Whetū o Te Tau)"	2010	—	Non-album singles
"Not Given Lightly" (Note: Cover of the Chris Knox song, as a part of an all-star charity record in association with the New Zealand Breast Cancer Foundation to raise awareness of breast cancer.) (Various Artists)	2012	—	Non-album singles
"Āta Tū Mai"	2019	—	Non-album singles
"Te Kore" (Diaz Grimm and Dame Hinewehi Mohi)	2021	—	Non-album singles
"—" denotes a recording that did not chart.
