= Kotahitanga (song) =

1999 single by Oceania

Single by Oceania (Hinewehi Mohi and Jaz Coleman)

from the album Oceania
- Language: Māori
- Released: 1999
- Genre: Māori music; Pop; House
- Length: 2:50
- Label: Point Music
- Songwriters: Hinewehi Mohi; Jaz Coleman
- Producer: Jaz Coleman

Hinewehi Mohi singles chronology
"The Myth" (1993)	"Kotahitanga" (1999)	"Pukaea" (2000)

Jaz Coleman singles chronology
"Moruroa (Atoll of the Great Secret)" (1995)	"Kotahitanga" (1999)	"Pukaea" (2000)

Music video
- "Kotahitanga" on YouTube

"Kotahitanga" (English: "Unity"), is a song by Oceania, a musical act formed by New Zealand vocalist Hinewehi Mohi and English producer Jaz Coleman. A house remix of the song by Beatmasters was released as a single in New Zealand and Europe.

== Background ==
Mohi debuted as a solo musician in the early 1990s. She met English producer Jaz Coleman of the band Killing Joke after he moved to New Zealand to become the composer-in-residence for the New Zealand Symphony Orchestra. Mohi, who was working as a television producer, sung at a tapu lifting ceremony for a recording studio, during which she impressed Coleman by her vocal ability. Mohi wrote the song together with Coleman. Mohi developed the chorus melody ("whaka awe, awe awe") first before developing the song in the studio with producers. She was inspired to create a song which would inspire the spirit.

The song has two versions featured on the group's debut album Oceania: one acoustic and one dance remix. The house remix of the song, produced by Beatmasters, was added to the record at the insistence of Mohi's record label in the United Kingdom, in order for the album to have a youth appeal. The remix was released as the leading single from the album in New Zealand and Europe. Mohi promoted the single in the United Kingdom in 1999, during which she shot a music video for the song in Epping Forest near London, redressed to look like New Zealand bush.

Mohi re-recorded the song in collaboration with the Auckland Chamber Orchestra in 2013, as a part of her album Raukatauri – Te Puhi o Te Tangi.

== Composition ==
"Kotahitanga" is a song that blends Māori language lyrics, traditional melodies and taonga pūoro (traditional instruments) with modern house musical progression and structures. The lyrics discuss solidarity and freedom for the Māori people. The chorus lyrics are based around the repeating phrase "whaka awe, awe awe" ("be inspired"), and the bridge features a haka called "I Runga".

== Reception and impact ==
While Mohi was in the United Kingdom, she was asked to perform the New Zealand National Anthem at the opening game of the 1999 Rugby World Cup. Mohi decided to sing the anthem in Māori instead of English, which received wide backlash in the New Zealand press at the time. During the World Cup, "Kotahitanga" was used as a song to promote and cheer on the All Blacks, and a special remix created for the event was featured on Land of My Fathers (1999), a promotional album of songs associated with the 1999 Rugby World Cup.

In a 2002 ranking by Mana magazine, "Kotahitanga" was the fifth most popular waiata chosen among Māori celebrities. The song was prominently used by the Jump Jam aerobics programme in New Zealand primary schools in the early 2000s, and was used as the opening theme of the 2000 Brazilian telenovela Uga-Uga.

== Track listings ==
- EU single (562 417–2)
1. "Kotahitanga (Union)" (7" Beatmasters Remix) – 3:28
2. "Kotahitanga (Union)" (Rob B's Vocal Remix) – 2:50
3. "Hineraukatauri (Goddess of Music)" – 4:53
- EU single 2 (566 571–2)
1. "Kotahitanga (Union)" (7" Mix) – 3:26
2. "Kotahitanga (Union)" (12" Mix) – 6:20
- Kotahitanga (The Eric Kupper Remixes) (UCGR 00009–1)
1. "Kotahitanga" (Hysterical Vocal Remix) – 9:26
2. "Kotahitanga" (Mix Show Radio Edit) – 4:02
3. "Kotahitanga" (Hysterical Dub) – 7:14
4. "Kotahitanga" (Instrumental Mix) – 4:02

== Credits and personnel ==
Credits for "Kotahitanga (Union) (7" Beatmasters Remix)" adapted from the "Kotahitanga" single.

- Beatmasters – producer
- Jaz Coleman – writer, producer
- Clive Goddard – engineer
- Hinewehi Mohi – lead vocalist, writer
