= AEIOU =

AEIOU may refer to:

== Language ==
- a, e, i, o, u, a traditional list of vowel letters in the Roman alphabet
- A.E.I.O.U., a device used by the Habsburgs

== Media ==
=== Music ===
- A.E.I.O.U. (album), 2005, by Sistars
- "AEIOU", a song on the debut album Waves and the Both of Us by Charlotte Sometimes
- "AEIOU (And Sometimes Y)", a song by Ebn Ozn
- "A.E.I.O.U.", a song by Zion I from Deep Water Slang V2.0
- "A.E.I.O.U", a 1983 song by The Europeans
- "AEIOU" (Moana and the Moahunters song)
- "AEIOU" (Pnau and Empire of the Sun song)

=== Other ===
- aeiou Encyclopedia, a free online collection of reference works in German and English about Austria-related topics
- Aeiou, a cartoon character featured in the older version of Muse magazine
- AEIOU, a graphic novel by cartoonist Jeffrey Brown
- AEIOU (film), a 1979 Czechoslovak film

== See also ==
- IOU (disambiguation)
