= Kua Makona =

1986 single by Moana

Single by Moana

from the album Tahi
- Language: Māori
- Released: 1986
- Genre: Māori music; Pop
- Length: 2:50
- Label: Maui Records
- Songwriters: Dalvanius Prime; Ngamaru Raerino
- Producer: Dalvanius Prime

Moana singles chronology
"Kua Makona" (1986)	"Pupurutia" (1989)

Moana & the Moahunters singles chronology
"A.E.I.O.U." (1991)	"Peace, Love and Family" / "Kua Makona" (1993)	"I'll Be the One" / "Rebel in Me" (1993)

Music video
- "Kua Makona" at NZ On Screen

"Kua Makona" (English: "Isn't That Enough") is the debut single from Moana Maniapoto. Produced by Dalvanius Prime and sung in the Māori language, the song was used in a campaign for the Alcohol Advisory Council of New Zealand. In 1993, the song was re-recorded as a pop-reggae version entitled "Kua Makona (Kori Kori Tinana Mix)", released as a single by Maniapoto's group Moana & the Moahunters. This version was later included on their debut album Tahi (1993).

== Background and composition ==
Maniapoto had been singing in clubs and cover bands and doing backing vocals, when musician Dalvanius Prime encouraged her to release her own music. The pair first met after one of Prime's concerts, when Maniapoto's then husband Willie Jackson approached Prime and introduced Maniapoto to him as a promising musician.

A year later, Prime contacted Maniapoto and asked her to take part in a campaign for the Alcohol Advisory Council of New Zealand, around promoting moderation among Māori. The campaign featured a pop song sung in Māori, produced by Prime and Ryan Monga (of Ardijah), which was released as a single under Prime's label Maui Records in 1986. The song describes a woman's love and despair she feels for a man with a drinking problem, and is a warning on the perils of driving under the influence of alcohol. The lyrics of the song were written by Ngamaru Raerino, who at the time was the Māori coordinator for Alcohol Advisory Council .

The campaign launched in 1987, featuring a music video (which included an appearance by Hinewehi Mohi), and a number of magazine appearances. During this time, Maniapoto was working as a barrister and graphic artist at Kia Mōhio Kia Mārama Trust, and singing at Club 21 on Queen Street with her band Whiteline. Maniapoto was unused to the fashion style that Prime suggested for the magazine and music video appearances, feeling as if he had transformed her into "the Māori Cher". The single began charting on the New Zealand singles chart in May 1987, peaking at number 27 in June. At the 1987 New Zealand Music Awards, "Kua Makona" was nominated for Best Polynesian work, losing to Herbs' "E Papa / Jah Knows". At the same awards ceremony, Maniapoto won the Most Promising Female Vocalist award.

After the formation of her band Moana & the Moahunters, the song was revisited in 1993, re-recorded as a pop reggae song and released as a double A-side single with "Peace, Love and Family" before the release of the group's debut album Tahi. The original version of the song was added to the 1996 CD release of the Pātea Māori Club album Poi E.

== Track listings ==
- NZ 7-inch single (MAUI 10)
1. "Kua Makona" – 2:50
2. "Kua Makona" (Instrumental) – 2:50
- NZ 12-inch single and cassette single
1. "Kua Makona" (Dance Mix) – 2:50
2. "Kua Makona" (Computer Blues Mix) – 2:50
3. "Kua Makona" (Maxi Mix) – 2:50
4. "Kua Makona" (Moana's Theme) – 2:50
5. "Kua Makona" (Computer Blues Percussive Mix) – 2:50
6. "Kua Makona" (Ballad Vocal/ Instrumental) – 2:50
- NZ 7-inch single (MAUI 12)
1. "Kua Makona" (Dance Mix) – 2:50
2. "Kua Makona" (Moana's Theme) – 2:50
- 1993 NZ CD single
1. "Peace, Love and Family" – 4:10
2. "Peace, Love and Family (Club Mix)" – 3:45
3. "Kua Makona (Kori Kori Tinana Mix)" – 4:26
4. "Kua Makona (Tuarua Mix)" – 3:02
5. "Peace, Love and Family (Acapella)" – 3:22

== Credits and personnel ==
Credits for the 1986 version adapted from the "Kua Makona" single.

- Computer Blues – executive producer
- Moana Maniapoto-Jackson – vocalist
- Graham Myhre – engineering
- Dalvanius Prime – co-producer, director, writer
- Ngamaru Raerino – writer

Credits for the 1993 version adapted from the "Peace, Love and Family" / "Kua Makona" single.

- Kōwhai Intermediate School – haka
- Angus McNaughton – producer, engineer, programming, mixing
- Moana Maniapoto – lead vocal, additional lyrics
- Dalvanius Prime – writer
- Ngamaru Raerino – writer
- Teremoana Rapley – rap
- Mina Ripia – rap

== Charts ==
Chart (1987)	Peak position
New Zealand (Recorded Music NZ)	27
Chart (1993)	Peak position
New Zealand (Recorded Music NZ)	23
