= The Fitz (Palmerston North) =

Bar in New Zealand

Coordinates: 40°21′37.2″S 175°36′44.3″E

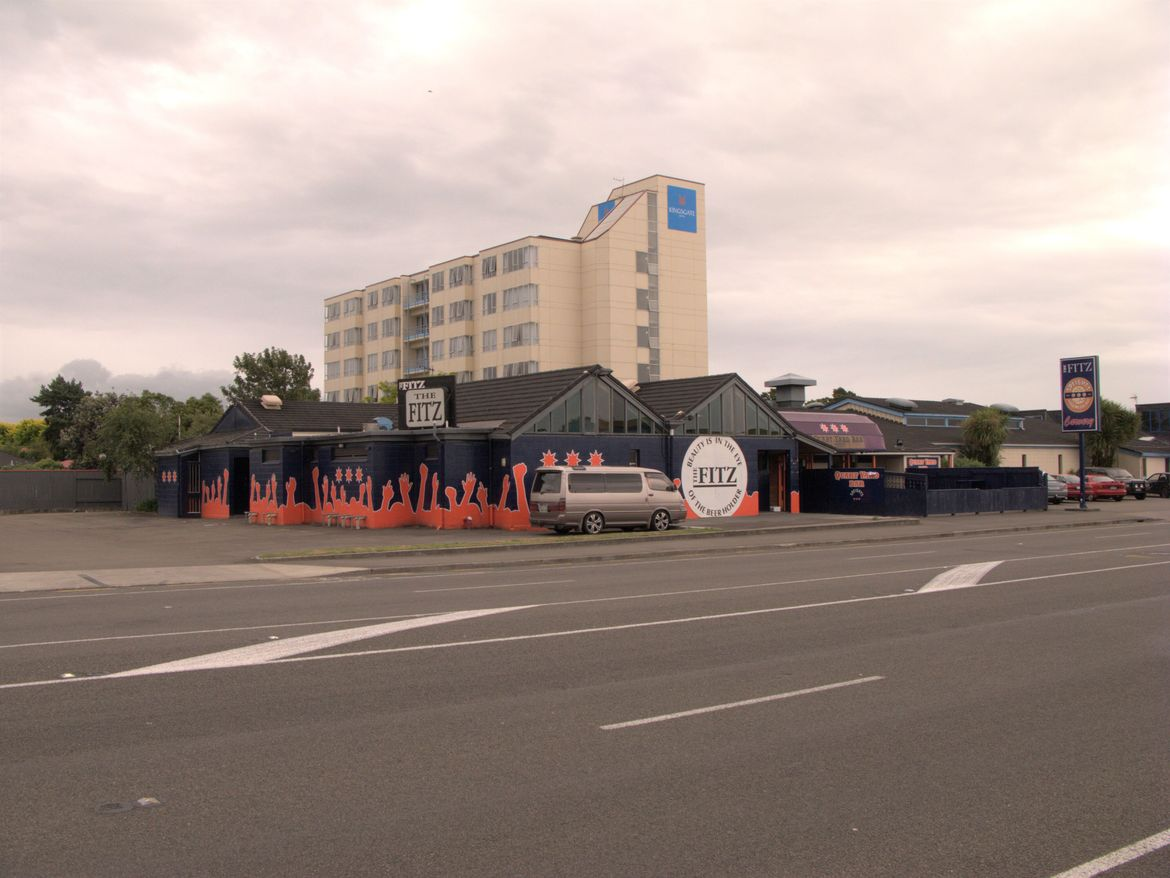
The Fitz Bar in the 2000s, before its closure, with the Kingsgate hotel in the background.

The Fitz was a notorious popular bar in Palmerston North, New Zealand. Opened in 1966, it gained notoriety as a student tavern until it closed in 2008. The building included the former Carvery bar and a liquor shop. The FItz and Carvery sections of the building were destroyed by fire in October 2025.

The pub was opened in 1966. It became known as Palmerston North's most infamous pub due to its house rules: "no dancing, no public displays of affection, no drinking with your right hand, and no nudity before 10pm". One regular customer, Deemo, allegedly set a world record by drinking an entire crate of beer (12 745ml bottles) in 58 minutes; he also "strawpedoed" an entire bottle of vodka in 4 seconds before stapling his genitals to the bar. In 1999 the bar organised a public game of nude rugby. A 2003 report in Salient described it as "a low-rent bogan hangout" with sticky floors and a drunk man seated in a canoe urinating into a beer jug.

In September 2003 a student, William Cranswick, died of a head injury after a drunken game of bullrush in the bar. The bar's duty manager was charged with criminal nuisance and supplying liquor to intoxicated persons, but the charges were dismissed in November 2004. He was subsequently stripped of his manager's certificate. An inquest into the death was told that Cranswick could have survived if an ambulance had been called.

In 2005 the pub was criticised by the Alcohol Advisory Council of New Zealand for its irresponsible promotion of drinking.

The pub closed in December 2008 after its owners decided that it was "not in keeping with our core business".

== 2025 fire ==
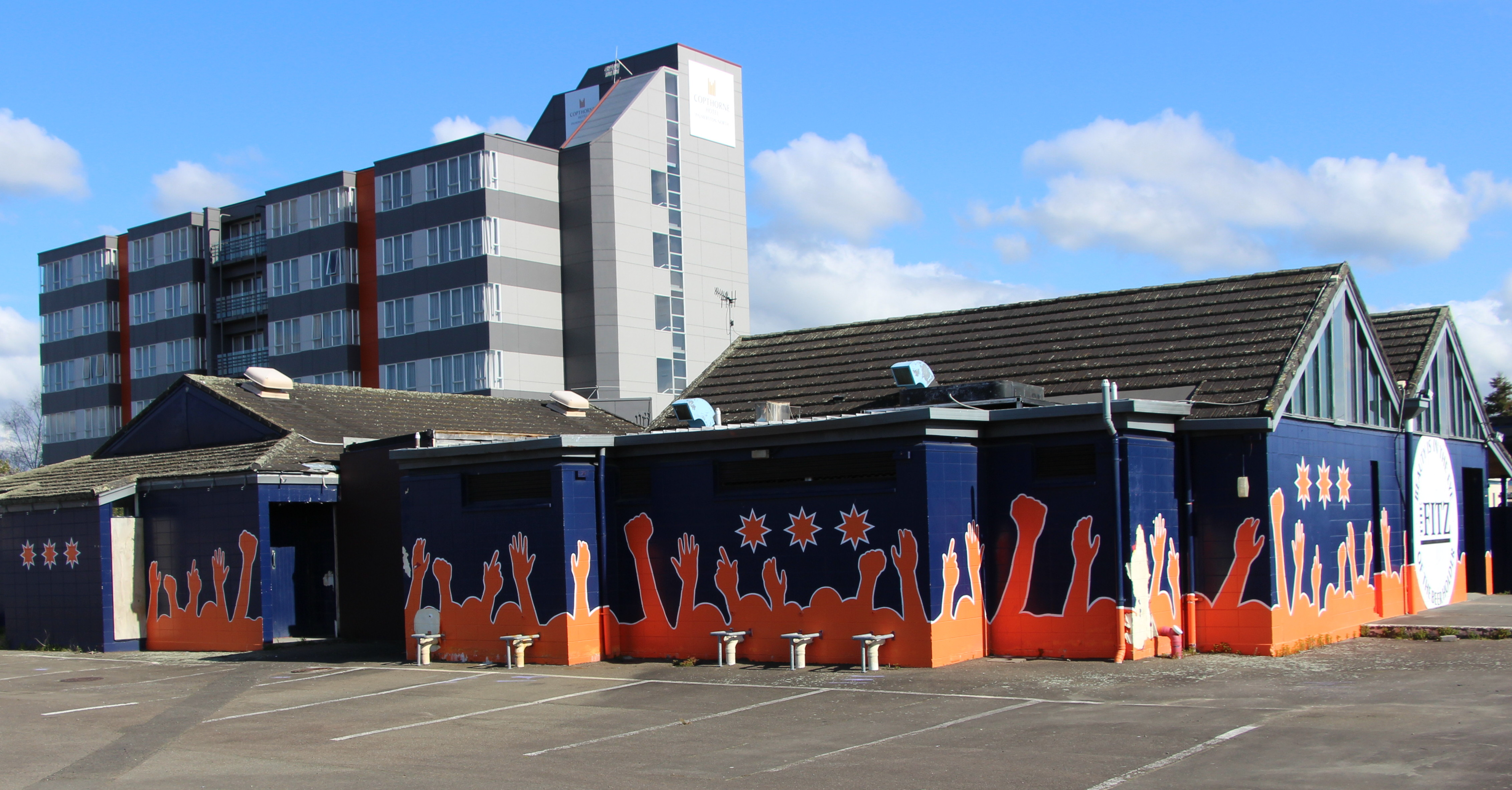
The Fitz site in 2015

A transformer fire in 2009 damaged the building. Following its closure the building was occasionally rented out for private parties, and in 2009 for a Tiki Taane concert. While the owners planned redevelopment, the site lay derelict for over a decade. In August 2024 its owners announced that it would be demolished. The building caught fire on 30 October 2025, prompting an emergency "stay indoors" warning over much of Palmerston North. Several schools, including the nearby Palmerston North Intermediate Normal School, were closed the next day due to concerns about airborne asbestos contamination from the fire.

An initial investigation found that the fire was suspicious. A teenager was subsequently charged with arson over the blaze.
