= IOU (disambiguation) =

An IOU is an acknowledgment of debt.

IOU may also refer to:

== Music ==
- I.O.U. (album), album by British jazz fusion guitarist Allan Holdsworth, 1982
- I.O.U., album by Gregory Isaacs, 1982
- "I.O.U." (Freeez song), 1983
- "I.O.U." (Jimmy Dean song), 1976
- "I.O.U." (Mike Shinoda song), 2018
- "I.O.U." (Lee Greenwood song), 1983
- "IOU", 2022 song by Five Finger Death Punch from AfterLife
- "I.O.U", 2020 song by NCT from NCT 2020 Resonance Pt. 2
- I.O.U. (hip hop group)

== Organizations ==
- Investor-owned utility, a supplier of basic services
- Intercultural Open University Foundation, a distance education institution
- Islamic Online University, an online, distance-learning university founded by Bilal Philips
- International Ornithologists' Union, new name of the International Ornithological Committee

== Other uses ==
- Interdependent Occupational Unit, the monetary unit of the Kingdom of Lovely in the British television series How to Start Your Own Country
- GURPS Illuminati University, a sourcebook for the GURPS role-playing game
- Intersection over union, a measure for the similarity of two sets, which is also known as Jaccard index

== See also ==
- IOYOU, former name of the Irish pop vocal group Westlife
- I Owe You, debut studio album by American contemporary gospel singer Kierra "Kiki" Sheard
- AEIOU (disambiguation)
