= Mina Ripia =

New Zealand musician

Mina Ripia (born 1969) is a New Zealand Māori (Ngā Puhi, Te Aupouri and Ngāti Kahungunu) musician.

== Biography ==
Ripia was born and grew up in Northland, in the small town of Te Kōpuru. She was an original member of the group Moana and the Moahunters. In 1999, she formed a Māori electronica group named Wai, which only performs in Māori.

In 2013, Ripia formed a Māori a cappella group, Whiri Tu Aka.

Ripia and her partner, Maaka McGregor, co-founded an audio production company, Minaaka, which specialises in producing Māori language audio products.
