= Hirini Melbourne =

Māori composer, singer, university lecturer, poet and author

Hirini (Sid) Melbourne ONZM (21 July 1949 – 6 January 2003) was a Māori composer, singer, university lecturer, poet and author who was notable for his contribution to the development of Māori music and the revival of Māori culture. He played traditional instruments (ngā taonga pūoro) and his waiata (songs) have preserved traditions and used Māori proverbs. He received the New Zealand Order of Merit in recognition of his services to Māori music. He was from Ngāi Tūhoe and Ngāti Kahungunu Māori tribes.

== Early life ==
Melbourne was born in Te Urewera of Ngāi Tūhoe and Ngāti Kahungunu descent.

== Career ==
Melbourne became a school teacher after attending Teachers College in Auckland but he did not enjoy teaching and left to become an editor of Māori texts at School Publications in the Department of Education in Wellington. From 1978 he was on the staff of the University of Waikato becoming an Associate Professor and Dean of the School of Māori and Pacific Development.

Melbourne had started composing waiata (songs) early in his career. In the last two decades of his life his musical interests extended to a fascination with traditional Māori instruments (ngā taonga pūoro). In 1985 he subsequently met ethnomusicologist and performer Richard Nunns. The two regularly performed together on marae, and in schools, galleries and concerts. Together with pounamu-carver Clem Mellish and carver Brian Flintoff, they also collected traditional knowledge about the instruments and how they were played.

Nunns and Melbourne released several recordings: Toiapiapi (1991), Te Kuraroa (1998), Te Ku te Whe (1994), and Te Hekenga-ā-rangi (2003), all widely regarded as influential in the ongoing ngā taonga pūoro revival. Rattle Records released Te Ku Te Whe, which included both original and traditional compositions and Te Hekenga-ā-rangi, where Melbourne and Nunns teamed with Aroha Yates-Smith. Te Hekenga-ā-rangi was recorded just weeks before Melbourne's death.

Melbourne regularly used his compositions to invoke the advice of elders to preserve and advance tikanga Māori. Melbourne's song E Kui e Koro incorporates the whakatauki (Māori proverb) "Mate kāinga tahi, Ora Kāinga rua" (when one home fails, have another to go to). Many Melbourne songs have been performed by other New Zealand musicians including Hinewehi Mohi, Moana Maniapoto, the Topp Twins and Mere Boynton.

== Activism ==
Melbourne was a member of the Nga Tamatoa protest group and many of his waiata were written as vehicles for ideals he was passionate about, most notably "Ngā Iwi E", composed for the New Zealand contingent heading to the 1984 Festival of Pacific Arts (cancelled after political unrest in New Caledonia). The song calls for unity among peoples of the Pacific. "Ngā Iwi E" has been a prominently used protest song for the Māori protest movement.

== Honours and awards ==
In 2002 Melbourne was awarded an Honorary Doctorate from the University of Waikato. He was appointed an Officer of the New Zealand Order of Merit in the 2003 New Year Honours, for services to Māori language, music and culture, just before his death a week later.

15 years after the original album, Rattle released Te Whaiao: Te Ku Te Whe Remixed, which won the Tui Award for the best Māori album at the New Zealand Music Awards in 2007, featuring what Nunns described as a "pretty stellar line-up" of contemporary New Zealand artists, including Salmonella Dub, Pitch Black and SJD.

In 2009 Melbourne and Nunns were inducted into the New Zealand Music Hall of Fame.

=== Aotearoa Music Awards ===
The Aotearoa Music Awards (previously known as New Zealand Music Awards (NZMA)) are an annual awards night celebrating excellence in New Zealand music and have been presented annually since 1965.

Year	Nominee / work	Award	Result	Ref.
2009	Hirini Melbourne	New Zealand Music Hall of Fame	inductee	

== Recordings ==
=== Solo ===
- Children Of Tane (New Zealand Birds Of The Forest) (Viking, 1979)
- Friends Of Maui - New Zealand Birds of The Sea (Viking, 1980)
- Te Aitanga a Tāne: Trees, birds & insects (Replay Radio 1984)
- Rūātoki children sing songs by Syd Melbourne (Replay Radio, 1985)
- Forest and Bird (Compilation, Viking, undated)
- Te Kuraroa (Kia Ata Mai, 1998)
- Te Wao Nui ā Tane (Huia, 1999)

=== With Richard Nunns ===
- Toiapiapi (Titi Tangiao, 1989; reissued Shearwaters, 2016)
- Te Kū Te Whē (Rattle Records, 1994)
- Te Hekenga-ā-rangi (Rattle Records, 2003)
- Te Whaiao (Te Kū Te Whē Remixed) (Rattle Records, 2006)

=== Scores ===
- Mauri (Awatea Films 1988)
- Hotere (2001)
- The Maori Merchant Of Venice (with Clive Cockburn) (Te Whai Rawa, 2002)
