= Richard Nunns =

New Zealand musician (1945–2021)

Richard Nunns QSM
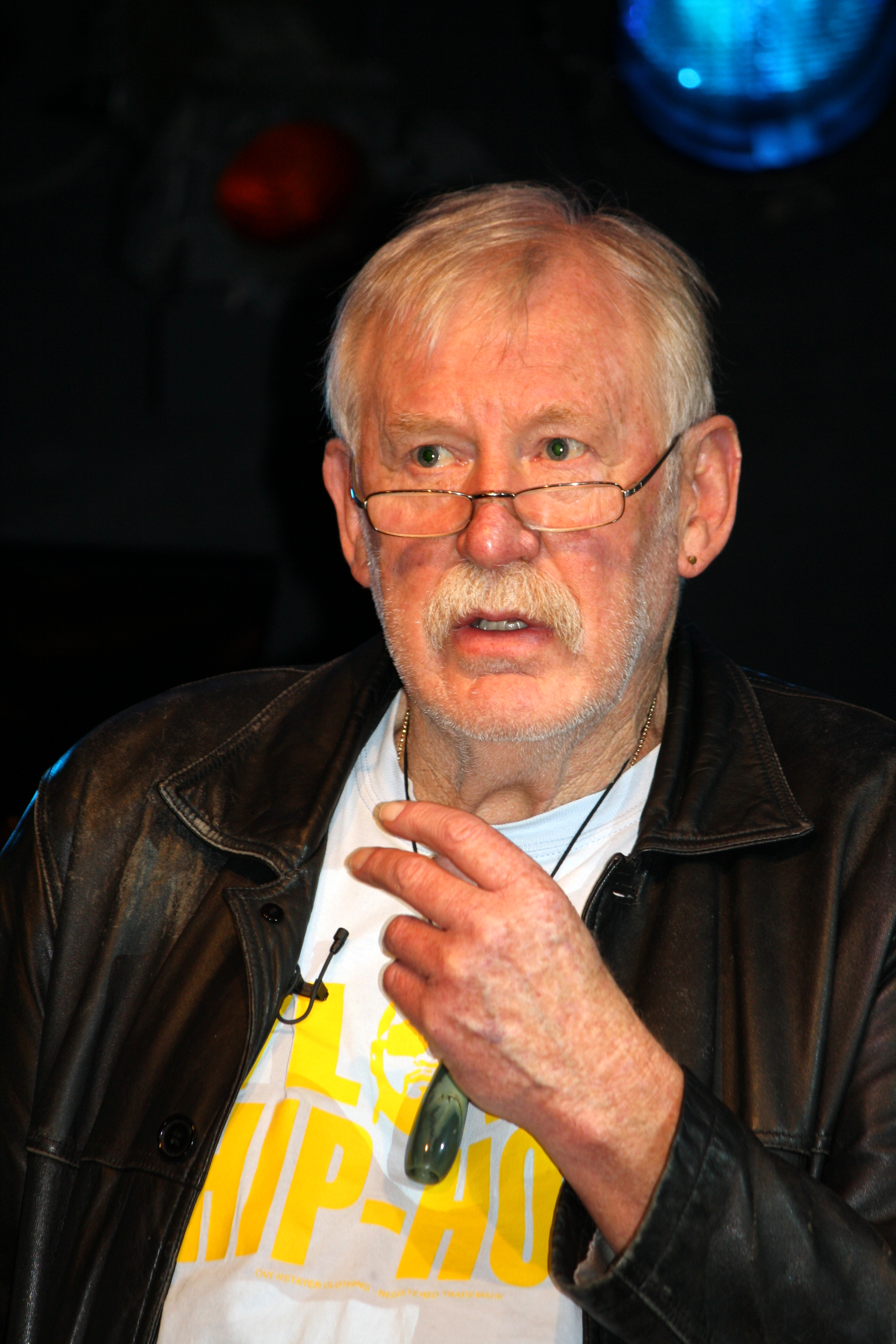
- Nunns in 2011

Background information
- Born: Richard Anthony Nunns; 7 December 1945; Napier, New Zealand
- Origin: New Zealand
- Died: 7 June 2021 (aged 75) Nelson, New Zealand
- Occupation: Musician
- Website: Official website

Richard Anthony Nunns QSM (7 December 1945 – 7 June 2021) was a Māori traditional instrumentalist of Pākehā heritage. He was particularly known for playing taonga pūoro and his collaboration with fellow Māori instrumentalist Hirini Melbourne. After Melbourne's death, he was regarded as the world's foremost authority on Māori instruments.

== Early life and family ==
Nunns was born on 7 December 1945 in Napier. He was a Pākehā of Scandinavian descent and was born into a musical family. After studying at Matamata College, he did teacher training at Canterbury University. As a teacher in his late 20s living in the Waikato, he helped build a marae, which fuelled his interest in Māori culture. At the time, he was a jazz musician. Nunns was married to writer Rachel Bush and had two daughters and five grandchildren.

== Professional life ==
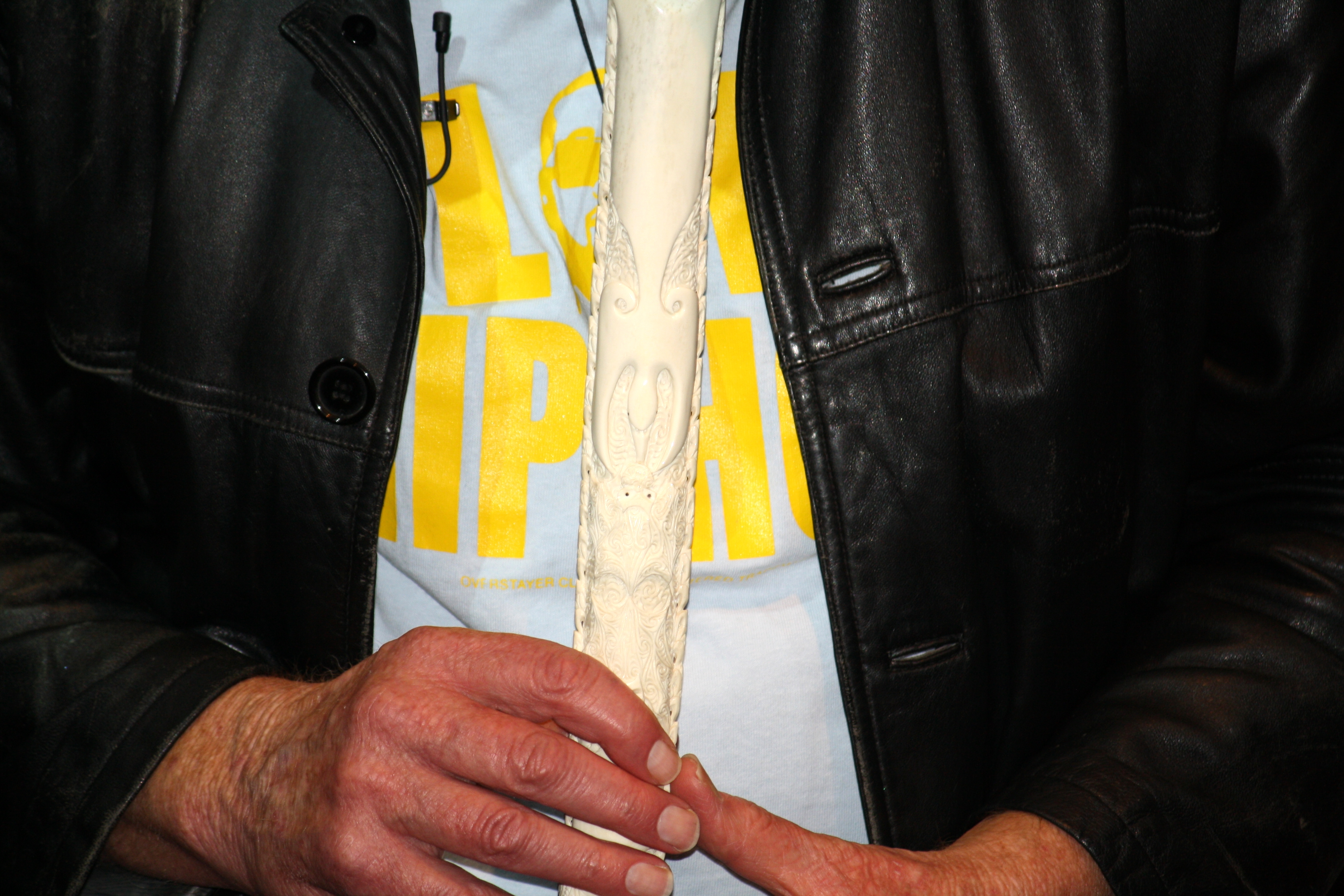
Richard Nunns playing a flute

For many years, Nunns performed with Hirini Melbourne (1949–2003), playing traditional Māori instruments. Together, they researched these instruments, which had not been played for over a century, as their use went out of tradition in the 1900s. For many of the instruments, which were still on display in museums, it wasn't even known what technique was used to play them. They are credited with reviving this part of Māori culture. After Melbourne's death, Nunns was regarded as the world's foremost authority on Māori instruments.

Nunns co-led the musicians at a dawn ceremony on opening day of Te Papa in 1998. He made recordings with musicians covering a wide variety of styles, including Moana and the Moahunters, the New Zealand Symphony Orchestra, the New Zealand String Quartet, King Kapisi, and Salmonella Dub. In addition, he toured with Māori musician Whirimako Black, jazz musician Evan Parker, pianists Marilyn Crispell, Paul Grabowsky and Mike Nock, and flautist Alexa Still. Nunns worked with composers Gareth Farr, Gillian Whitehead, and John Purser, and contributed to the soundtracks for The Lord of the Rings film trilogy and Whale Rider.

In 2001, Nunns achieved the position of research associate in the music department of the University of Waikato.

== Later life and death ==
Nunns was diagnosed with Parkinson's disease in 2005; he continued to perform (including an international tour in 2012) though his public appearances became rarer by 2015. In 2009, Nunns was given the Arts Laureate award by the Arts Foundation of New Zealand. Nunns was the subject of a tribute concert in his honour held at the Museum of New Zealand Te Papa Tongarewa in 2013. Nunns amassed over 70 traditional wind and percussion instruments within his collection throughout his long career. Nunns died in Nelson on 7 June 2021, aged 75.

== Honours and awards ==
Nunns held an honorary life membership of the New Zealand Flute Association. In 2001, Nunns received a citation for services to music from the Composers Association of New Zealand. He was a category winner twice in the New Zealand Music Awards (in 2006 and 2007). He was bestowed an honorary doctorate by Victoria University of Wellington in 2008 for his contributions to Tāonga Puoro. In the 2009 Queen's Birthday Honours, Nunns was awarded the Queen's Service Medal, for services to taonga pūoro. Later that year he and Melbourne were jointly inducted in the New Zealand Music Hall of Fame. Later in the same year, he received a Laureate Award from the Arts Foundation of New Zealand.

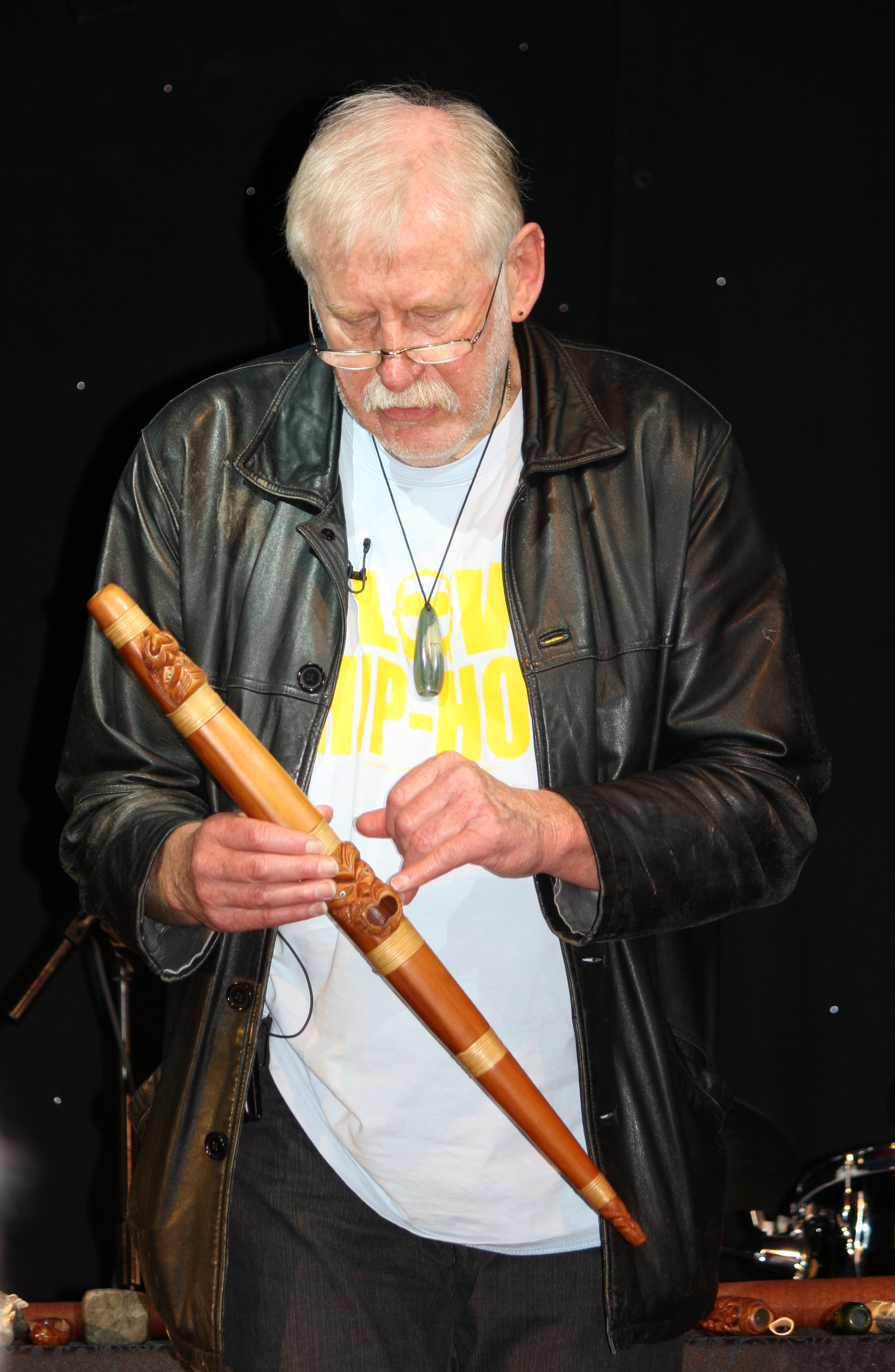
A pūtōrino (flute/trumpet)

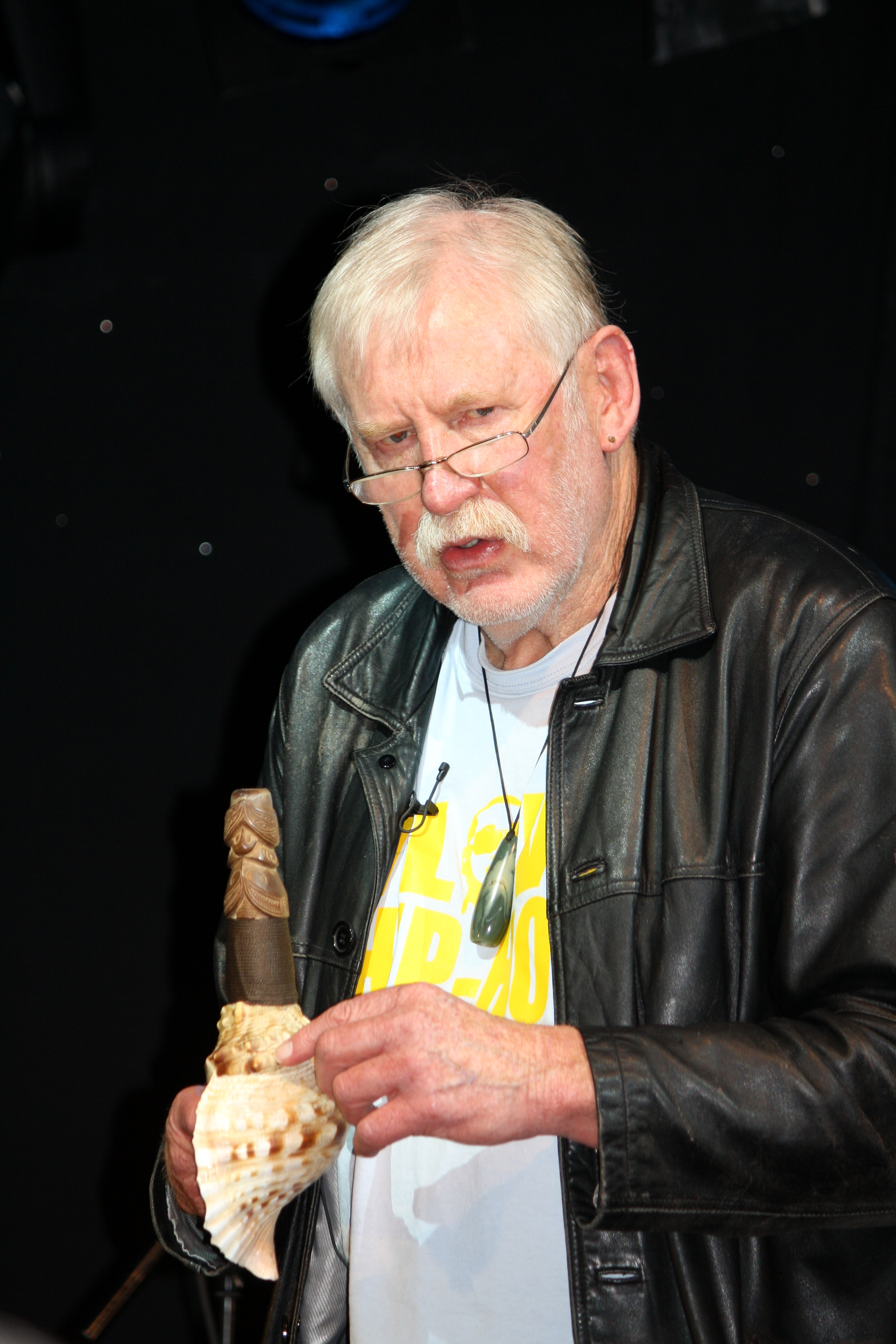
A pūtātara (conch horn)

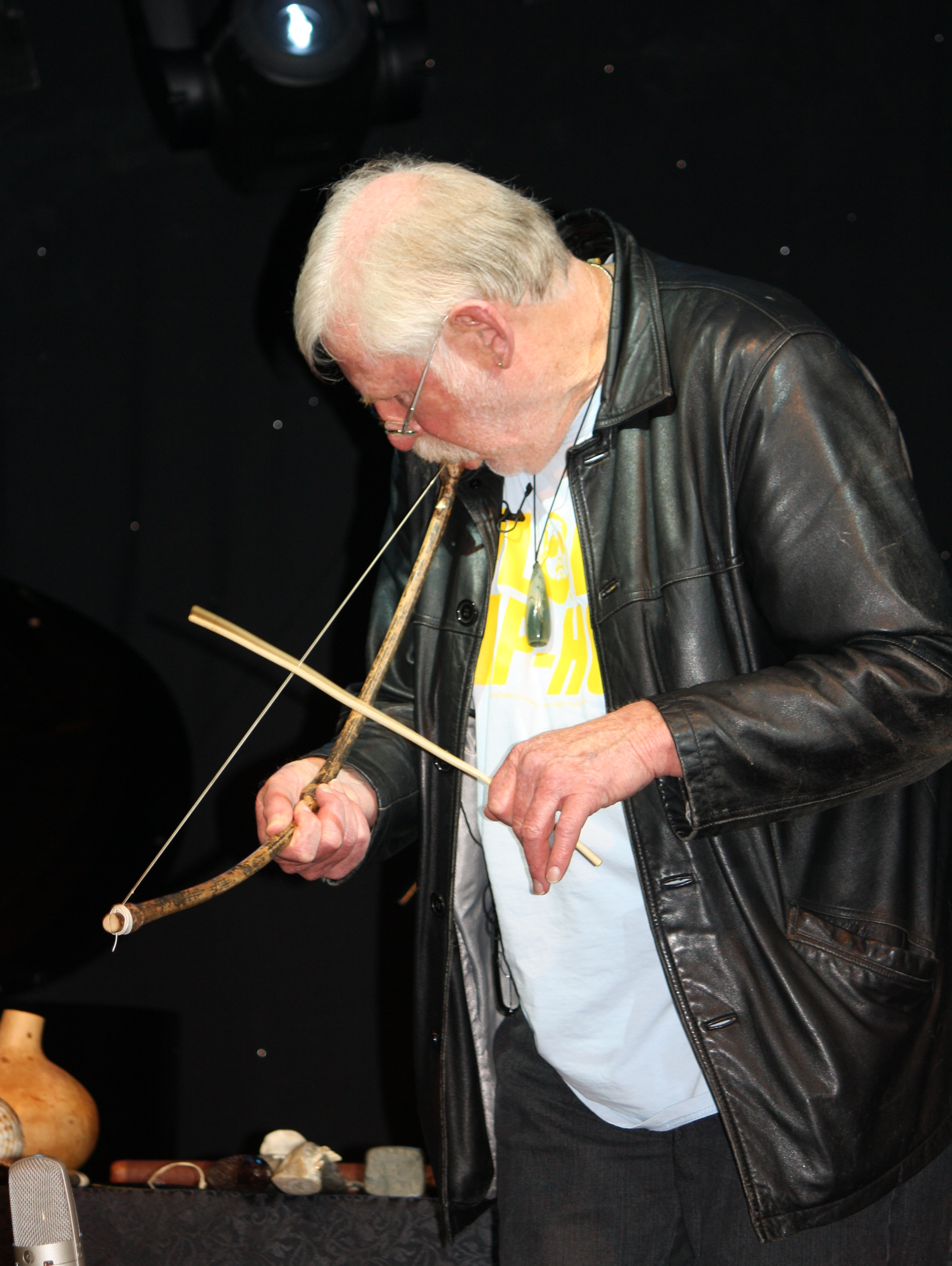
A kū (traditional musical bow)

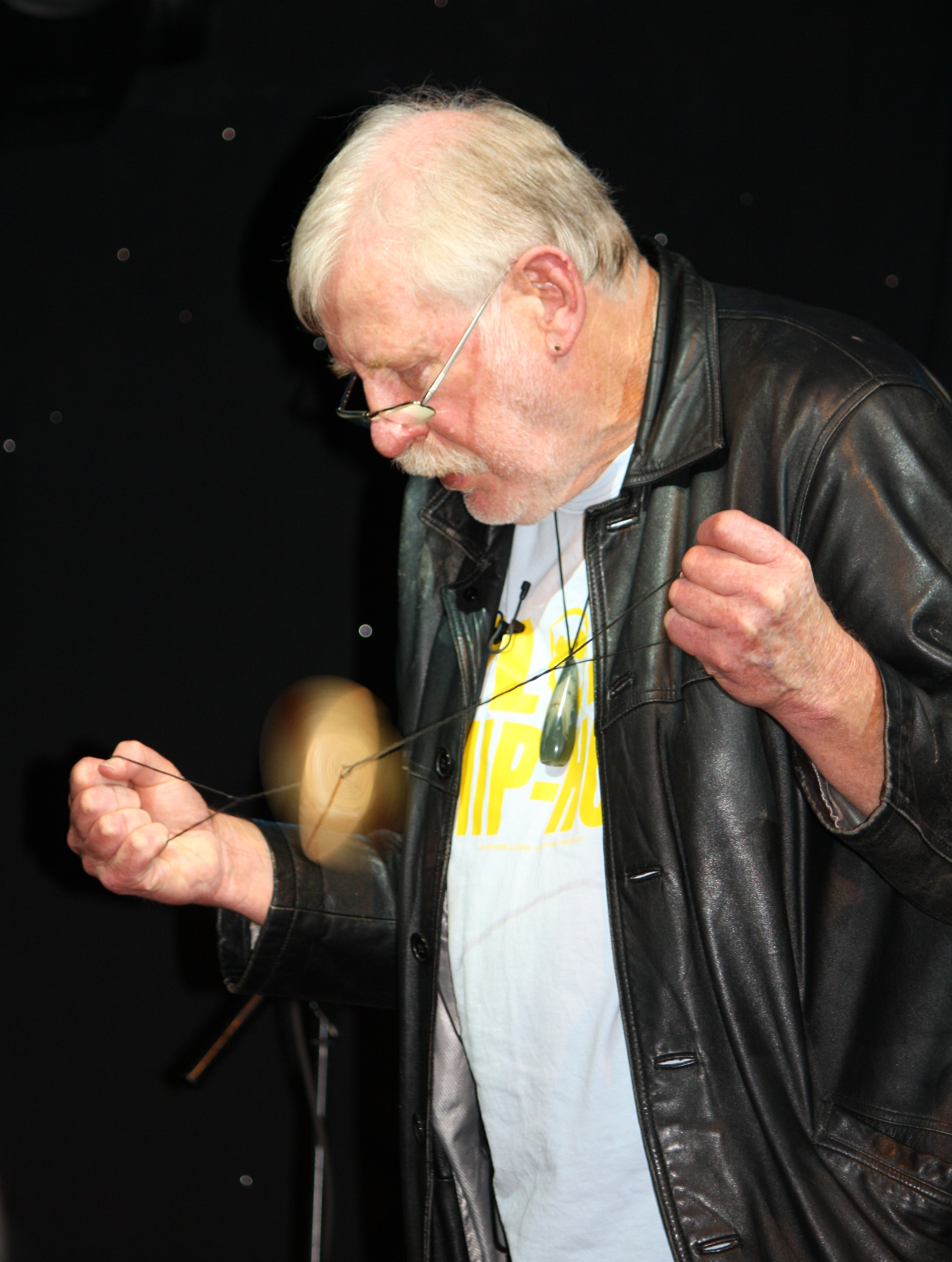
A porotiti, which is spun very quickly and then blown at

== Awards ==
=== Aotearoa Music Awards ===
The Aotearoa Music Awards (previously known as New Zealand Music Awards (NZMA)) are an annual awards night celebrating excellence in New Zealand music and have been presented annually since 1965.

Year	Nominee / work	Award	Result	Ref.
2009	Richard Nunns	New Zealand Music Hall of Fame	inductee	
