= Moana (singer) =

New Zealand singer, songwriter and film-maker

Moana MNZM
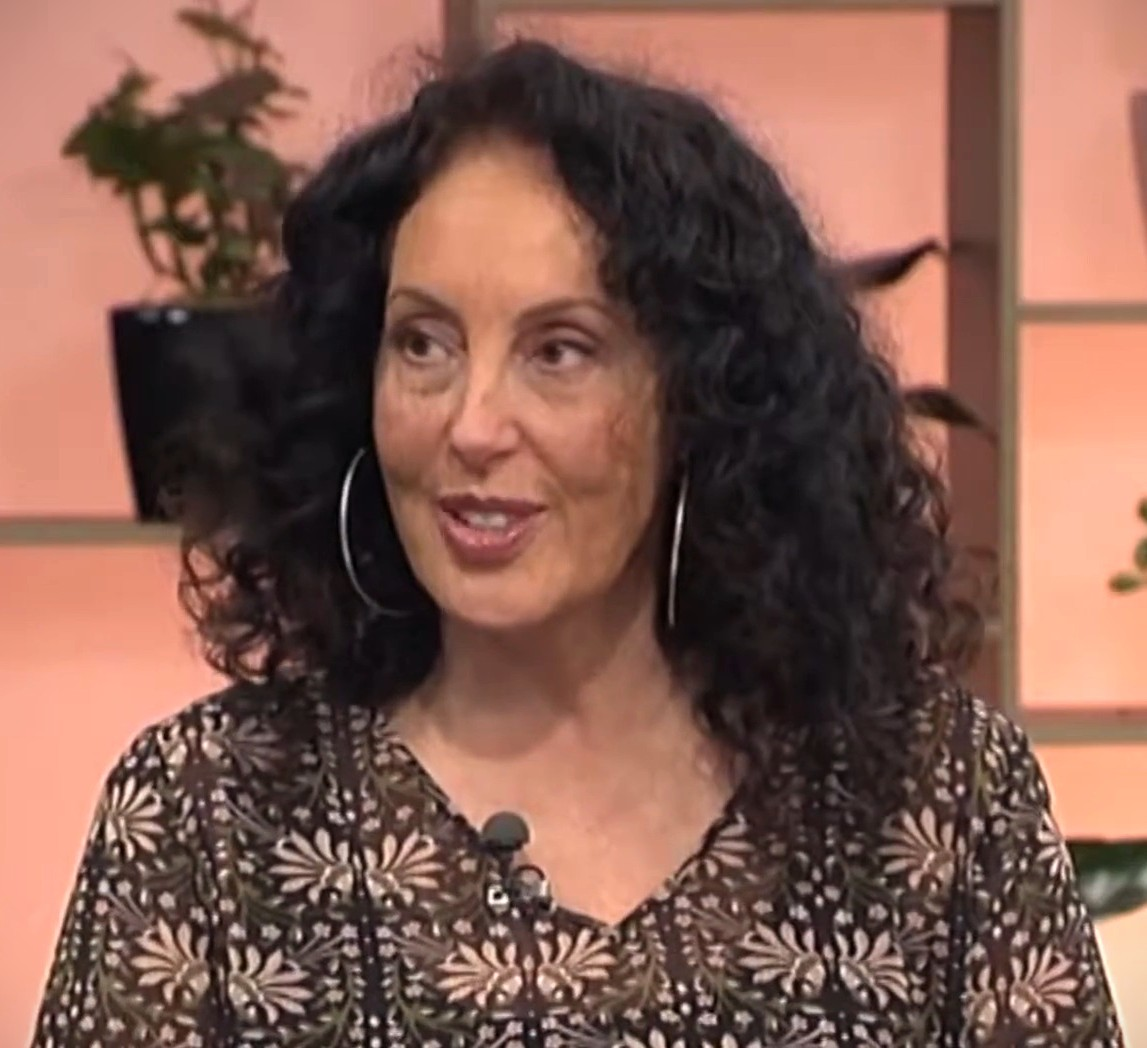
- Maniapoto in 2018

Background information
- Also known as: Moana Maniapoto-Jackson
- Born: Moana Maniapoto; 22 June 1961 (age 65); Invercargill, New Zealand
- Origin: New Zealand
- Genre: Pop
- Occupations: Singer, songwriter, film-maker
- Label: Black Pearl / Sony BMG / Ode / Rhythmethod
- Website: www.moananz.com

Moana Maree Maniapoto MNZM (born 22 June 1961) is a New Zealand singer, songwriter and documentary maker. She is widely considered one of New Zealand's most successful indigenous acts, and her music is described as a fusion of traditional Māori haka, chants and taonga pūoro, with contemporary soul, reggae and classical styles. Moana was briefly married to New Zealand politician and radio personality Willie Jackson, during which time she was known as Moana Maniapoto-Jackson; they divorced in 2001. In 2016, Moana was inducted into the New Zealand Music Hall of Fame.

== Early life ==
Maniapoto was born in Invercargill, New Zealand. Her Māori father, Nepia Tauri Maniapoto, was of Ngāti Tūwharetoa and Te Arawa descent. Her Southland-born mother, Bernadette Elizabeth Margaret (née Honywood; 1936–2025), was of Irish and English heritage. Maniapoto attended St Joseph's Māori Girls' College in Napier and completed her secondary school education at McKillop College, Rotorua. She is said to have paid her way through Auckland law school by singing covers in the highly competitive Auckland club circuit. She was raised Roman Catholic, with her cousin Max Mariu being the first Māori bishop. However during her college years Maniapoto began to question her Catholic beliefs, and abandoned them entirely after the birth of her children. She now considers herself a follower of traditional Māori spirituality.

== Career ==
=== 1986–1998: Moana and the Moahunters ===
In 1986, Moana debuted as a solo artist and released "Kua Makona" as a part of a campaign for the Alcohol Advisory Council of New Zealand. The song was produced by Maui Dalvanius Prime and peaked at number 27 on the RIANZ singles chart. In 1989, Moana formed Moana and the Moahunters with Teremoana Rapley and Mina Ripia.

In 1990, Moana and the Moahunters released "Black Pearl" which peaked at number 2 on the national charts in 1991, earning Moana her first gold.

In 1991, Moana and the Moahunters released "AEIOU (Akona Te Reo)" (English: Learn the Language), which combined rap with traditional Māori song. The lyrics of the single urged Māori youth to work to preserve their culture and traditions, learn about their history, and for all New Zealanders to learn the Māori language. The song was nominated for several awards in 1991. The band released their debut album Tahi in August 1993.

The band's second album, Rua, combined pop, hip-hop and Māori music. The songs on the album dealt with themes such as spirituality and prophecy, and the album cover used traditional Māori symbols. Other songs discussed colonial issues, such as the Treaty of Waitangi, signed between the Māori people and the British government in the 1840s. The group scored a gold record in New Zealand and a hit single. Moana retired the group after performing at the 1998 Vancouver Folk Festival.

==== Promotion of Māori culture ====
Moana and the Moahunters were well known for pioneering a distinctively Māori form of popular music, during a period when Māori language and culture was not as widely accepted or promoted as today. The band had a significant influence due to their style and message to the public. Besides their music, the group was well-known for their use of the traditional Māori haka. During concerts they projected images behind them related to the Māori people, such as the New Zealand landscape or traditional Māori tā moko tattooing.

Although they rap mostly in English, as most Māori youth did not speak much Māori in the early 1990s, the group's lyrics emphasise the necessity of studying their history and culture. When the group received a New Zealand Music Industry award in 1992, they accused the New Zealand radio of racism against Māori groups, whose music was categorised as "underground" and refused airtime by DJs.

=== 2002–present: Moana and the Tribe ===
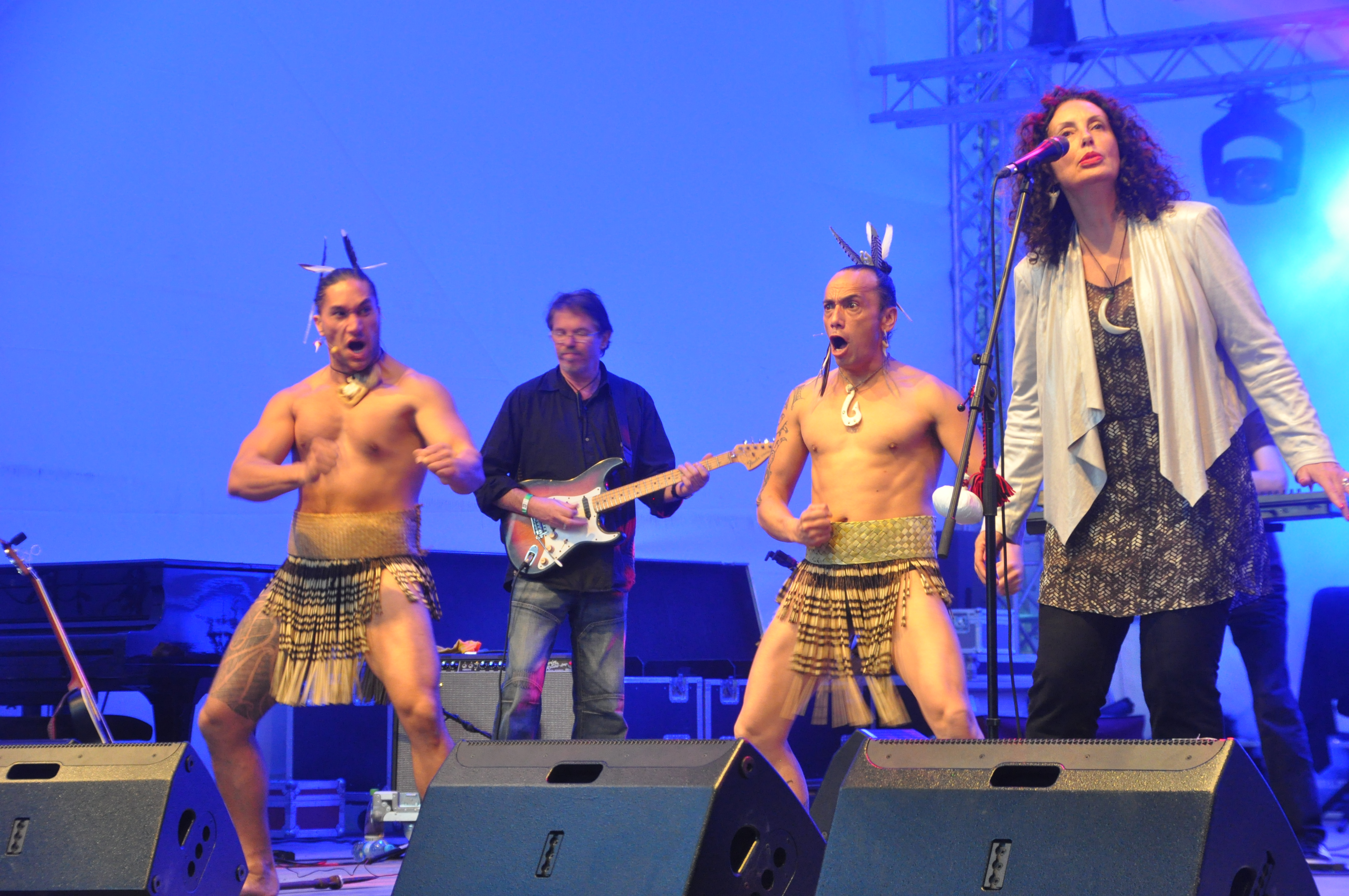
Moana and the Tribe (New Zealand), 11th Horizonte World Music Festival (2013) in Koblenz (Germany)

In 2002, Moana formed the band Moana and the Tribe which consisted of a large group of musicians and performers with a passion for Māori culture. Since their formation, the band has become one of the most successful indigenous bands to emerge from New Zealand.

In May 2008, Moana released Wha. She toured in 2008 and 2009 Germany, Australia, Netherlands, Turkey, New Zealand and performed at the opening of the Biennale in Venice / Italy in June 2009. Moana & the Tribe launched songs from their 5th album Rima in 2014 at Womad NZ.

In 2014, Moana and her band formed the Boomerang Collaboration with Scottish band Breabach, Shellie Morris, Casey Donovan and Djakapurra, playing concerts at Womad NZ, Sydney Opera House and HebCelt (Scotland). Rima was a finalist at the 2015 Vodafone NZ Music Awards and the song "Upokohue" was a finalist in the APRA Maioha Award. It won 2nd place in the World category at the International Songwriting Contest.

== Other activities ==
Moana is one half of an award-winning film-making team led by her partner and band member Toby Mills. Their documentary work includes Guarding the Family Silver, which screened in the National Geographic All Roads Film Festival and The Russians are Coming, which played at the Sydney Opera House during the Message Sticks Indigenous Film Festival in 2012.

She is also a regular writer for the Māori and Pacific online weekly newspaper e-tangata.

Moana is the presenter of the weekly current affairs television programme Te Ao with Moana, which broadcasts at 8 pm every Monday on Māori Television and is currently in its third series.

== Recognition ==
Moana won the grand prize at the 2003 International Songwriting Competition with her song "Moko". In 2003, New Zealand Herald described Moana's music as "music of great depth and beauty".

In the 2004 Queen's Birthday Honours, Moana was appointed a Member of the New Zealand Order of Merit, for services to Māori and music. She is also a Life Time Recipient of the Toi Iho Māori Made Mark and received the 2005 Te Tohu Mahi Hou a Te Waka Toi Award from Te Waka Toi (Creative N.Z.), in recognition of her outstanding leadership and contribution to the development of new directions in Māori art. Moana received a Music Industry Award at the Maori Waiata 2008 Awards, also for her positive contribution to Māori Music.

At the 2019 Taite Music Prize, Moana and the Moahunters won the seventh annual Independent Music NZ Classic Record award for Tahi, 26 years after its release.

== Discography ==
=== Studio albums ===
List of studio albums, with New Zealand chart positions
Title	Album details	Peak chart positions
Title	Album details	NZ
Tahi (as Moana and the Moahunters)	Released: August 1993; Label: Southside Records, Festival Records (D30787); Format: CD, Cassette	16
Rua (as Moana and the Moahunters)	Released: February 1998; Label: Tangata (TANGCD532); Format: CD, cassette	24
Toru (as Moana & the Tribe)	Released: 2003; Label: Format: CD	–
Wha (as Moana & the Tribe)	Released: 2008; Label: Ode Records (BP001); Format: CD	–
Acoustic (as Moana & the Tribe)	Released: 2010; Label: RAJON (RRCD44); Format: CD; Recorded in 2004 in Helen Young Studios, Auckland	–
Rima (as Moana & the Tribe)	Released: September 2014; Label: Black Pearl; Format: DD	–

=== Compilation albums ===
List of compilations
Title	Album details
The Best of Moana & The Tribe (as Moana and the Moahunters)	Released: February 2012; Label: Blackpearl; Format: DD

=== Extended plays ===
List of EP, with New Zealand chart positions
Title	Details	Peak chart positions
Title	Details	NZ
Kua Makona (as Moana)	Released: 1987; Label: Maui Records (MAUIEP 11); Format: 12" LP	30

=== Singles ===
List of singles with selected New Zealand positions
Title	Year	Peak chart positions	Album
Title	Year	NZ	Album
as Moana
1986	"Kua Makona"	27	Kua Makona
as Moana and the Moahunters
1990	"Black Pearl"	2	Tahi
1991	"AEIOU"	31	Tahi
1993	"Peace, Love and Family" / "Kua Makona"	23	Tahi
1993	"I'll Be the One" / "Rebel in Me"	39	Tahi
1994	"Tahi"	9	Tahi
1995	"Give It Up Now"	24	Rua
1996	"Prophecies"	—	Rua
1996	"Treaty"	—	Rua
1997	"Bird in a Tree"	—	Rua
1998	"Moko"	—	Rua
as Moana and the Tribe
2014	"Whole Worlds Watching "	—	Rima
2016	"Huakirangi"	—	
2016	"Fire in Paradise" (featuring Skarra Mucci)	—	

== Awards ==
=== Aotearoa Music Awards ===
The Aotearoa Music Awards (previously known as New Zealand Music Awards (NZMA)) are an annual awards night celebrating excellence in New Zealand music and have been presented annually since 1965.

Year	Nominee / work	Award	Result	Ref.
1987	Moana – "Kua Makona"	Polynesian of the Year	Nominated	
1987	Moana	Most Promising Female	Won	
1988	Moana Moahunters	Polynesian of the Year	Nominated	
1989	Moana & The Moahunters – "Pupurutia"	Polynesian of the Year	Nominated	
1989	Moana Jackson	Female of the Year	Nominated	
1992	Moana & The Moahunters – "A.E.I.O.U."	Māori of the Year	Won	
1992	Moana Jackson	Female of the Year	Nominated	
1992	Teremoana Rapley – Moana & The Moahunters/MC OJ	Most Promising Female	Won	
1992	Moana & The Moahunters – "A.E.I.O.U."	Music Video of the Year	Nominated	
1996	Moana and The Moahunters – "Give it Up Now"	Mana Māori of the Year	Nominated	
1996	Moana and The Moahunters – "Akona te Reo '95"	Mana Reo	Nominated	
1999	Moana and The Moahunters – Rua	Mana Māori of the Year	Won	
1999	Moana and The Moahunters – Rua	Mana Reo	Nominated	
2008	Moana & the Tribe – Wha	Māori of the Year	Nominated	
2015	Moana & the Tribe – Rima	Māori of the Year	Nominated	
2016	Moana	New Zealand Music Hall of Fame	inductee	
