= Alcohol Advisory Council of New Zealand =

- Kaunihera Whakatūpato Waipiro o Aotearoa

Agency overview
- Headquarters: Level 13, ABN Amro House, 36 Customhouse Quay, Wellington 6145
- Annual budget: $12.7m
- Agency executives: Peter Glensor, Chairman; Gerard Vaughan, Chief Executive Officer
- Website: http://www.alcohol.org.nz/

The Alcohol Advisory Council of New Zealand ("ALAC") was established in 1976, by the government of New Zealand, under the Alcohol Advisory Council Act of 1976, following a report by the Royal Commission of Inquiry into the Sale of Liquor. Its purpose is "the encouragement and promotion of moderation in the use of liquor, the discouragement and reduction of the misuse of liquor, and the minimisation of the personal, social, and economic harm resulting from the misuse of liquor."

ALAC is funded by a levy on alcohol produced and imported for sale in New Zealand. The levy is collected by the Customs Service.

== Current operations ==
ALAC has a 2008/09 budget of $12.7m and spent $13m in the 2007 year.

Most of its work revolves around providing information (pamphlets, on-line resources), advertising and education programs.
