= Taonga pūoro =

Māori traditional musical instruments

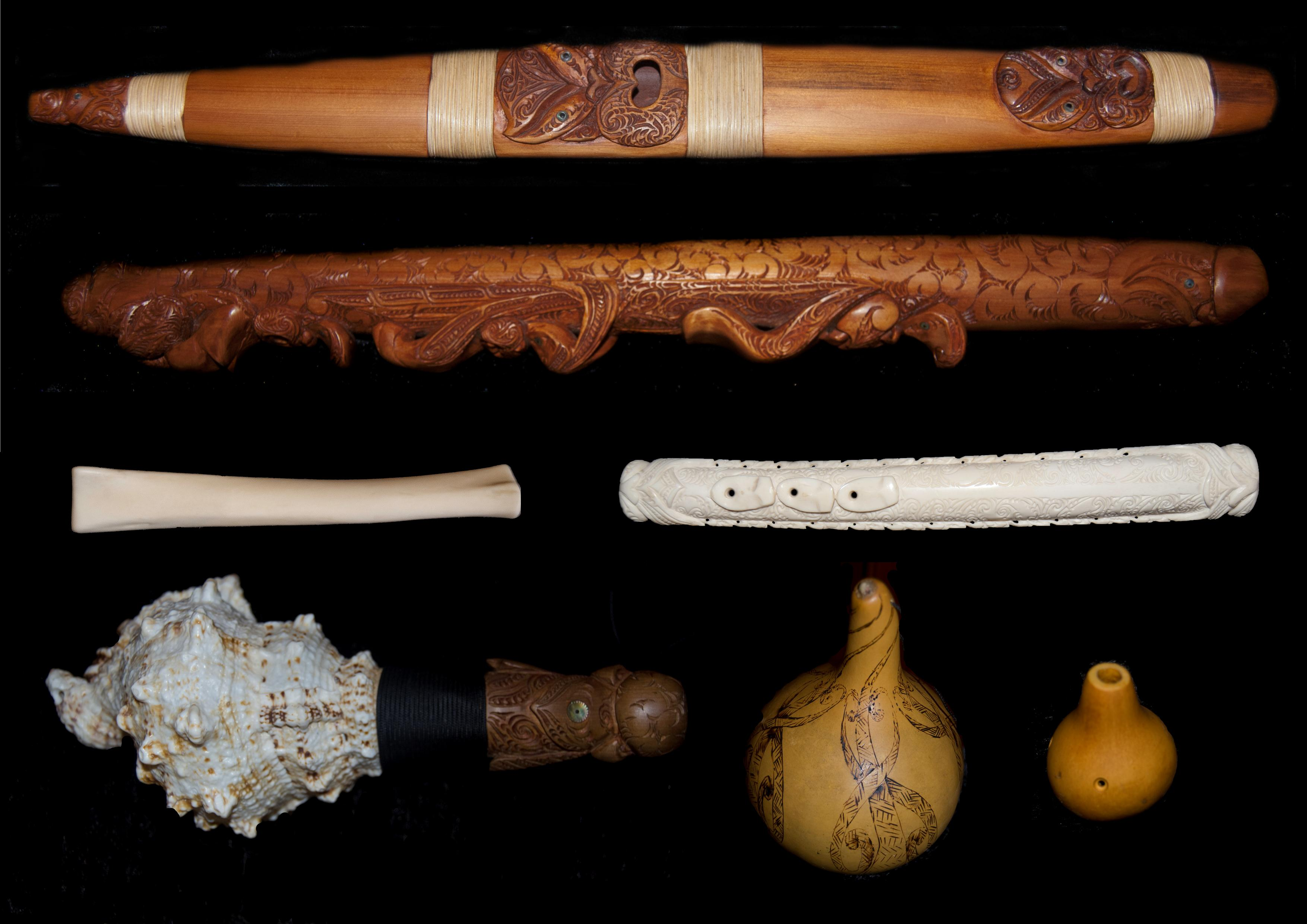
A selection of taonga pūoro from the collection of Horomona Horo

Taonga pūoro are the traditional musical instruments of the Māori people of New Zealand.

The instruments previously fulfilled many functions within Māori society including a call to arms, announcing the dawning of the new day, communications with the gods, and the planting of crops. They are significant in sacred rituals and also fulfill a story-telling role. Many of the sounds of the instruments and tunes are imitations of the sounds of nature, including the wind, the seas and the natural world of birds and insects.

Knowledge of taonga pūoro has been revived over the past thirty years by Hirini Melbourne, Richard Nunns, Brian Flintoff, and expert stone carver Clem Mellish.

== Cultural placement ==
=== Classifications ===
Taonga pūoro and their uses and classifications are intimately connected with Māori culture and religious practice. The instruments are all part of the families of the gods, and their classifications are directly related to the gods and the creation story where "The Gods sang the Universe into Existence". The universal building blocks of music, melody (Rangi) and rhythm (Papa) are named for the Sky Father and Earth Mother (Ranginui and Papatuanuku, or Rangi and Papa) from the Māori creation story. Further classifications are derived from their children. The god of the winds is Tawhiri, and from him come the wind instruments. The shell instruments are from Tangaroa, god of the sea, and Tane and his daughters Hine Pu te Hue and Hine Raukatauri govern the other instruments derived from forest and earth materials. Today, sometimes substitute materials are used in the making of the instruments and several instruments fall into more than one family being a combination of materials. Māori music inventory notably has no membranophones compared to neighbouring regional cultures.

=== Traditional usage ===
The use of these instruments, as part of the toolkit of the tohunga (Māori priests), seemed to be exclusively used as an oral flux between Ira Tangata (man) to Ira Atua (the Divine/Gods) or the temporal and the spiritual, which is why Māori regarded them with awe and respect; they were regarded as tapu (sacred/taboo) items of use from the tohunga. When used for entertainment and for recreation, it was a hidden and private practice.

Many of these musical traditions had been lost over time as a result of colonisation, but researchers and enthusiasts such as Richard Nunns, Hirini Melbourne, Clem Mellish and Brian Flintoff have done considerable restorative work and provided a wealth of knowledge and information around the sounds, history and stories of these taonga (treasures).

Today, taonga pūoro are used more frequently at Māori ceremonies and by New Zealand composers.

== Instruments ==
=== Wind instruments ===
==== Flutes (woodwind) ====
===== Kōauau =====
The kōauau is a small, ductless and notchless flute, 10 to 20 cm (4 to 8 in) long, open at both ends and having from three to six finger holes placed along the pipe. Kōauau resembles flutes the world over in tone quality and in the range of sounds that can be produced by directing the breath across the sharp edge of the upper aperture. Māori kōauau players were renowned for the power it gave them over the affections of women (notably illustrated by the story of Tūtānekai, who, by playing his kōauau to cause Hinemoa to swim to him across Lake Rotorua). Kōauau is made of wood or bone. Formerly the bone was of bird bone such as albatross or moa; some instruments were also of human bone and were associated with chiefly status and with the traditional practice of utu.

===== Nguru =====
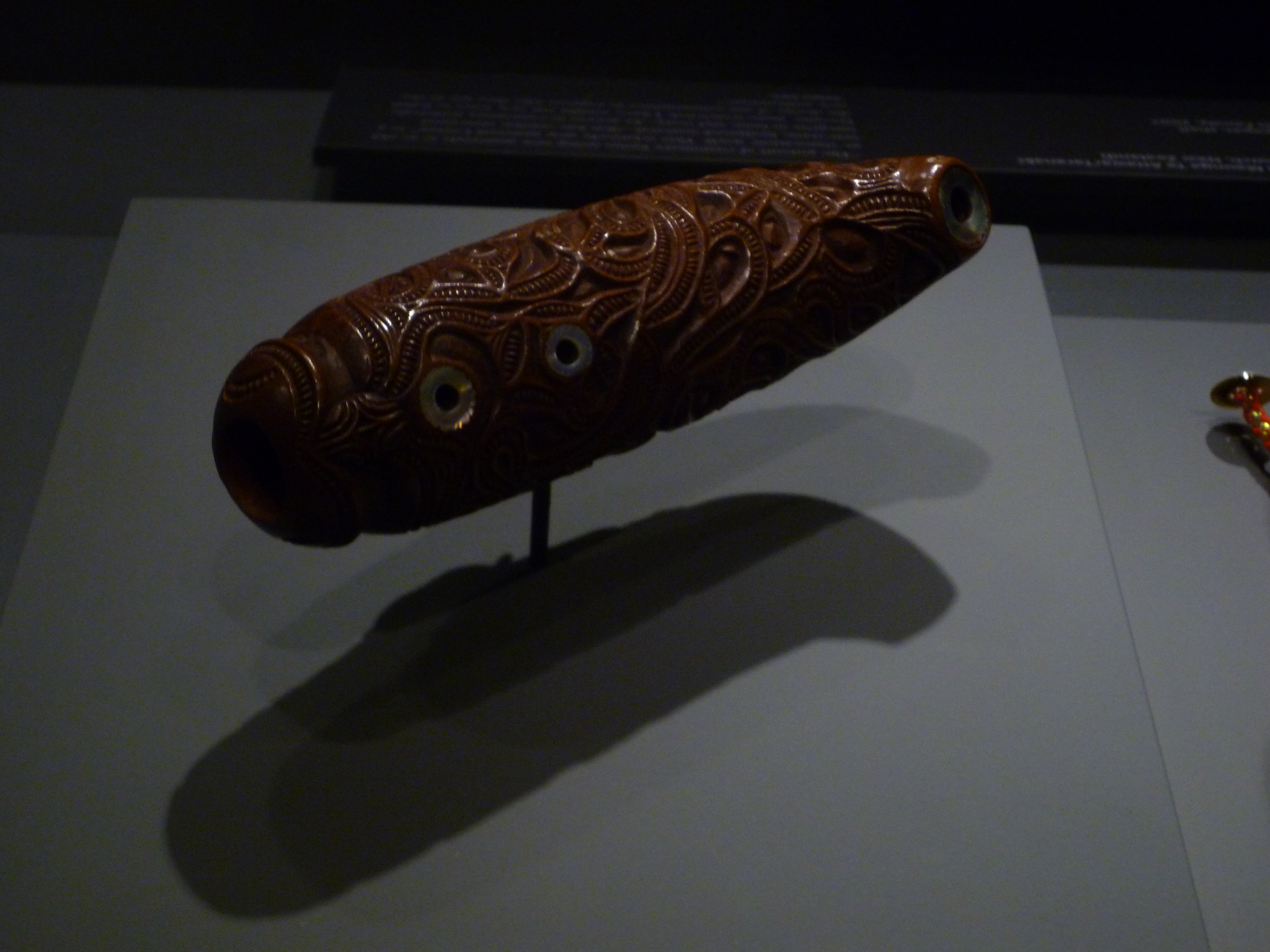
Nguru made from wood with pāua shell inserts

The nguru is a small vessel flute in the Helmholtz oscillator class, like an ocarina or xun. It is made of wood, soapstone or bone and shaped like a whale's tooth. Sometimes it is made from a whale's tooth. It is from 5 to 15 cm (2 to 6 in) in length, wide at the blowing end and tapering to the lower where it is slightly turned up. It has two or three finger holes and an extra hole bored on the underside, near the curved end, through which a cord could be passed so that it could hang around the owner's neck. It is played in the same way as a kōauau and produces a similar pure flute-like sound. The nguru is sometimes classified as a nose flute perhaps because the word nguru means to sigh, moan, or snore. This is unlikely because the large end is too wide for a nostril and, if the curved end were placed in that same position, the flute would lie at an impossible angle for the player to reach the finger holes.

===== Rehu =====
A long flute with a closed top and a transverse blowing hole and finger holes like a pōrutu.

===== Pūmotomoto =====
A long flute with a notched open top which is the blowing edge and a single finger hole near the end – the instrument was chanted through and was traditionally played over the fontanelle of an infant to implant songs and tribal information into the child's subconscious.

===== Pūtōrino =====
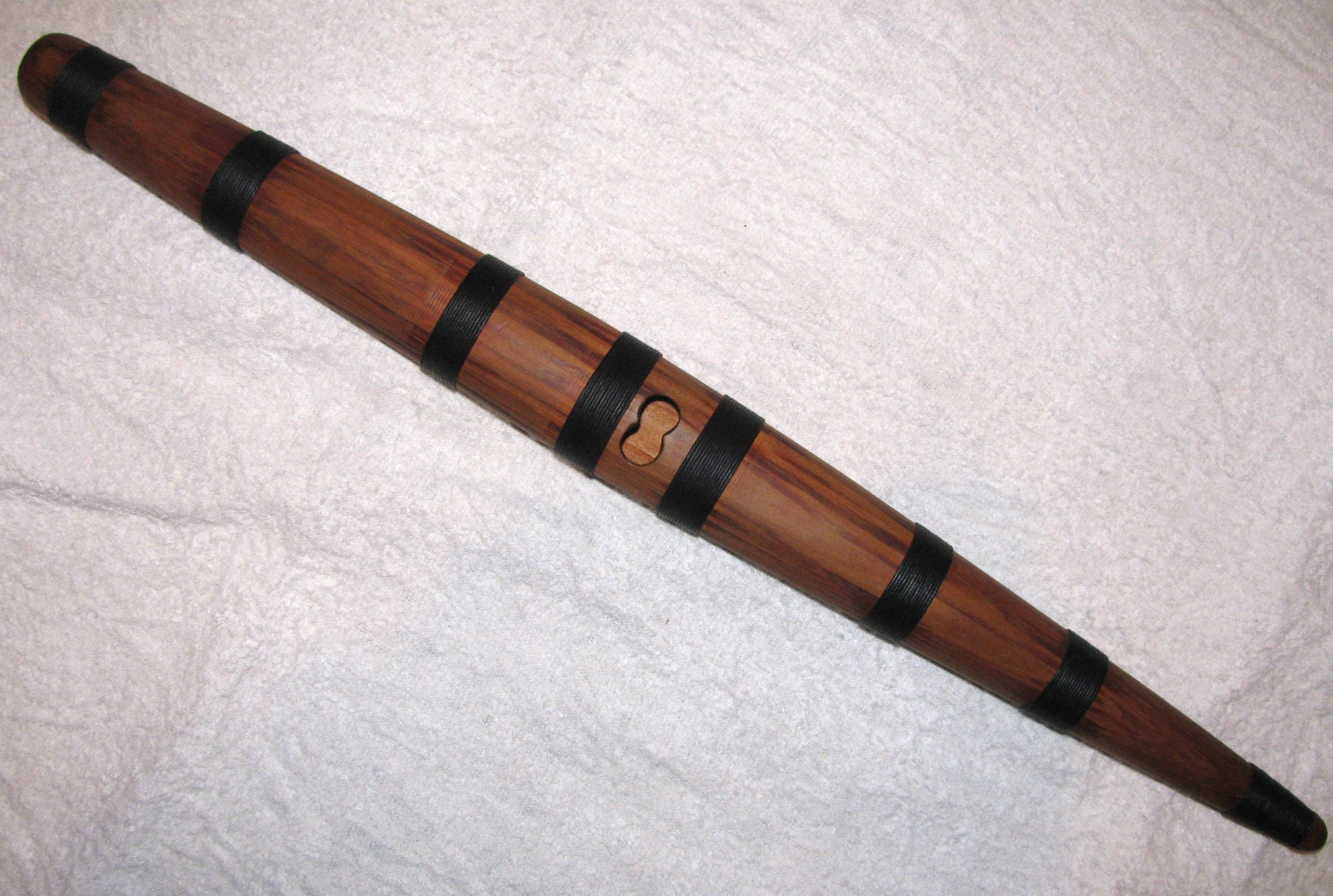
An example of a large Pūtōrino made by Tohunga Whakairo Warren Warbrick

The pūtōrino is known for its wide range of voices including a male voice (trumpet) and a female voice (flute). The pūtōrino varies in length from 20 to 50 cm (8 to 19.5 in) and has an uneven bore, swelling out to the centre and diminishing evenly towards the lower end, where the pipe is narrow and has either a very small opening or none at all. The outer shape is carved from a solid piece of wood, split in half lengthwise, hollowed out like two small waka and then lashed together again with flax cord or a similar substitute for binding. At the widest part of the pipe, there is an opening that often looks like an intricately carved humanistic mouth. The finest specimens are decorated at both ends with carved figures, and the open mouth is part of a head which is outlined on the flat surface of the pipe. It can be played with bugle technique, with closed lips which are set in vibration by the rapid withdrawal of the tongue. Small variations of pitch can be produced by moving the forefinger over the centre opening. The putorino is believed to be created by the goddess Raukatauri who was obsessed with moths (Liothula omnivora), so it is shaped like a moth chrysalis.

Its loudness can range between a flute, a trumpet, and a megaphone.

===== Pōrutu =====
The pōrutu is a long version of the kōauau, usually measuring from 38 to 57 cm (15 to 22 in) long. The playing quality differs depending on the material it is made from. New Zealand native hardwoods such as mānuka, mataī, or black maire are suitable for clean resonating effects. Like the pūtorino, it has two voices, the male (trumpet) and female (flute). The female voice can produce up to five harmonics depending on the bore.

==== Trumpets ====
===== Pūkaea =====
The pūkaea is a traditional Maori trumpet made of wood. There are several differing designs and lengths within the pūkaea genre. Pūkaea were used to announce relay signals at times of conflict and were also used to announce the rituals associated with the planting of kumara (sweet potato) and other crops. The function of this instrument is to herald spiritual pathways. As a war trumpet they were used in announcing an oncoming war-party and were dedicated to Tūmatauenga (god of war). In the announcement of harvest they were dedicated to Rongomatane (God of agriculture, arts and peace). Today they can be heard heralding the visitors onto the marae or at the opening and closing of important ceremonies.

===== Pūtātara =====
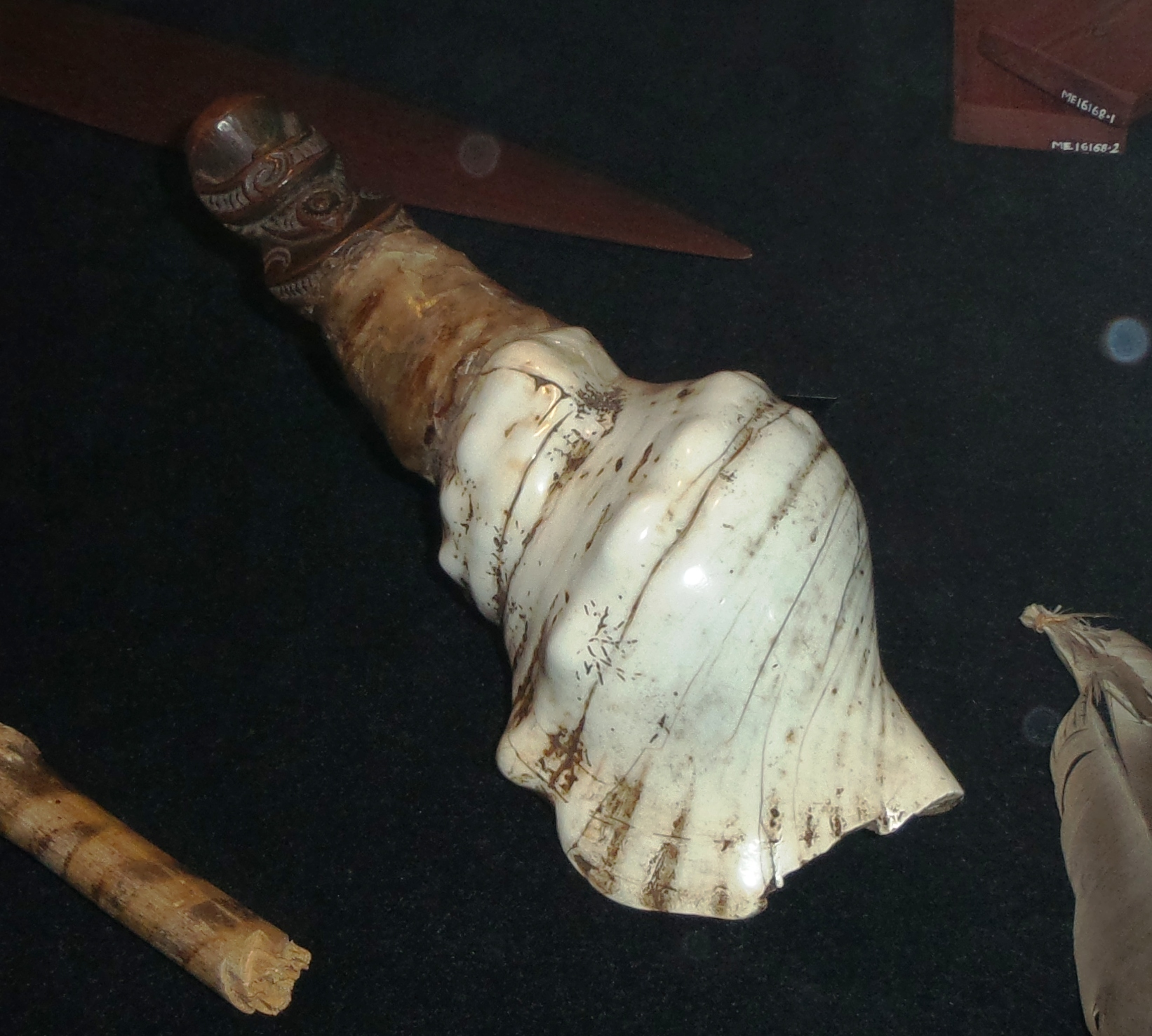
A pūtātara in Museum of New Zealand Te Papa Tongarewa

The pūtātara is a traditional Maori conch shell trumpet, which had a variety of roles from signalling to ceremonial and ritual use.

=== Percussion instrument ===
==== Pahū Pounamu ====
This Maori musical instrument is made of wood and a jade / greenstone gong and was used in the whare purakau (house of learning). Part of it is made of the jaw bone of the upokohue (pilot whale) and the striker is made from akeake, a native hardwood.

==== Tōkere ====
Refers to two kinds of wooden instruments: a pair of clappers used in the main islands, and a slit drum introduced from Tahiti (i.e. the tōʻere) via contact with the Cook Islands and its diaspora.

=== Whirled instruments ===
==== Pūrerehua ====
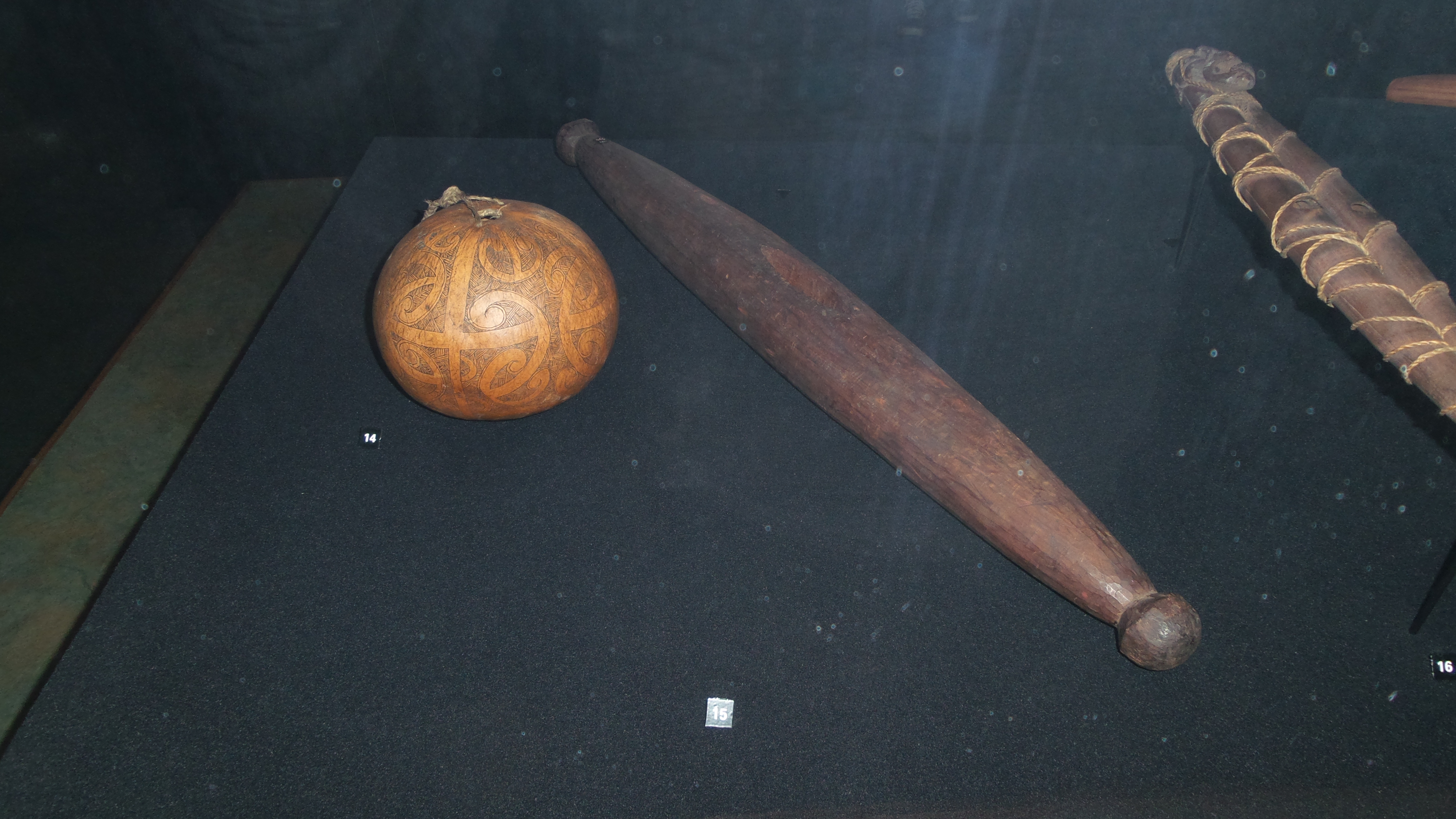
Poi awhiowhio or gourd instrument shown on the left

The pūrerehua can be made of bone, wood or stone, they are blade-like and swing on a long cord producing a loud, deep whirling that can be heard from a distance. A rapid spinning motion will start the music of the pūrerehua's song as it rotates and flutters. Uses vary from luring lizards, summoning rain, communicating and attracting a soul mate.

==== Poi awhiowhio ====
This Māori musical instrument was used as a bird lure. It was made by hollowing a gourd, drilling holes on either side and attaching a cord by which it could be swung around the head creating a whistling, chattering voice that attracted birds.

=== Lamellophones ===
==== Rōria ====
The rōria is a lamellophone, involving a small piece of flexible wood which is held in the mouth and plucked, to create a sound that modulated how spoken words and songs sounded. The instrument was often made from mamaku bark.

== Modern usage ==
Taonga pūoro are currently used for their traditional purposes, but also in many genres of music from classical, orchestral, chamber music, through to pop, alternative and in film music. They were used in the musical sound tracks of films such as Once Were Warriors and Whale Rider, and are becoming more widely used in television and film music to produce authentic natural sounds rather than artificially generated sounds.

New Zealand composers such as Gillian Whitehead and Martin Lodge have used taonga pūoro extensively in the genre of art music combining the traditional Maori instruments with western instruments. These composers were noted for this work in March 2013 by UK publication, Gramophone. In 2010, British film and orchestral composer, Paul Lewis collaborated with master taonga pūoro composer and performer, Horomona Horo, to produce Legends of Rotorua, a fifty-minute composition for a wide variety of taonga pūoro, string quartet, harp, flute, storyteller and soprano. In 2015, Ariana Tikao and Philip Brownlee composed the first concerto for taonga puoro, called Ko Te Tātai Whetu. Tikao performed the piece with the Christchurch Symphony Orchestra, Stroma and the Nelson Symphony Orchestra, and was due to perform it with New Zealand Symphony Orchestra in April 2020 (but this was postponed due to the COVID-19 pandemic).

Horomona Horo, the protege of the late Dr Hirini Melbourne and Richard Nunns, was the winner of the inaugural Dynasty Heritage Concerto Competition in 2001, using an array of taonga pūoro. He has collaborated with numerous artists such as Moana and the Moahunters (later Moana and the Tribe), the New Zealand String Quartet, Canto Maori, and Irish group, Green Fire Islands, incorporating taonga pūoro into hip-hop, chamber music, pop, and opera. Salmonella Dub, Tiki Taane and Fat Freddy's Drop have all used taonga pūoro on their albums.

The University of Waikato Conservatorium of Music has established a programme to study the instruments in a formal academic capacity under composer and director of The New Zealand Music Research Group, Martin Lodge. Richard Nunns was granted an honorary doctorate by the university in recognition of his contribution to New Zealand Music and the revival of taonga pūoro. He was also a research associate at the University of Waikato.

=== Haumanu Collective ===
In the 1990s Dr Hirini Melbourne, Brian Flintoff and Richard Nunns founded Haumanu Collective as an educational resource and performance group for the revitalisation of taonga pūoro. The name "hau-manu" means "breath of birds"; birdsong is an important touchstone for taonga pūoro instrumentation.

As of 2026, the governing board of Haumanu Collective includes:

- Elizabeth Gray
- Tāmihana Kātene
- Horomona Horo
- Awhina Tamapara
- James Webster
- Mahina-Ina Kingi-Kaui
- Jo'el Komene
- Eli Maiava
- Brendon Moses

==== Recent Haumanu Collective projects ====
Haumanu Collective produce books, podcasts, musical albums and community events centred around educating people about taonga pūoro.

- In 2021, they participated in Pūoro Tū: the first taonga pūoro music festival in Wellington.
- In 2022, Haumanu launched their podcast series, Oro Rua: Kōrero Taonga Pūoro.
- In 2023, Haumanu Collective produced He Kete Pūoro Vol 1 – an album by Horomona Horo and Elizabeth Gray, featuring several musical collaborators including Maisey Rika and Jeremy Mayall.
- In 2024, Elizabeth Gray's children's book Hineraukatauri me Te Ara Pūoro was published by Huia Publishers. This was illustrated by Rehua Wilson, and produced as a Haumanu Collective project.
- In 2025, Haumanu Collective hosted a large-scale taonga pūoro symposium over five days at Kirikiriroa Marae in Waikato. Later that same year they performed at the 18th Annual Waiata Māori Music Awards.
