= Hayley Westenra discography =

- Studio albums: 10
- Compilation albums: 8
- Singles: 4

This is the discography of New Zealand-born classical crossover singer Hayley Westenra.

Westenra is a Christchurch, New Zealand soprano, classical crossover artist.

== Solo studio albums ==
Title	Album details	Peak chart positions						Certifications (sales thresholds)
Title	Album details	NZ	AUS	UK	UK Classical	US	JPN	Certifications (sales thresholds)
Hayley Westenra	Released: 26 April 2001; Label: Universal; Formats: CD	1	—	—	—	—	—	RMNZ: 5× Platinum
My Gift to You	Released: 15 November 2001; Label: Universal; Formats: CD	4	—	—	—	—	—	RMNZ: 3× Platinum
Pure	Released: 10 July 2003; Label: Decca; Formats: CD	1	7	8	1	70	—	RMNZ: 12× Platinum; ARIA: Platinum; BPI: 2× Platinum
Odyssey	Released: 8 August 2005; Label: Decca; Formats: CD, digital download	1	21	10	1	—	—	RMNZ: 3× Platinum; BPI: Gold
Treasure (as Celtic Treasure in the US, Canada and AUS)	Released: 26 February 2007; Label: Decca; Formats: CD, digital download	1	47	9	1	184	—	RMNZ: 2× Platinum; BPI: Silver
Hayley Sings Japanese Songs	Released: 23 June 2008; Label: Universal; Formats: CD, digital download	—	—	—	—	—	10	
Hayley Sings Japanese Songs 2	Released: 17 March 2009; Label: Universal; Formats: CD, digital download	—	—	—	—	—	16	
Winter Magic (as Christmas Magic in NZ and AUS)	Released: 30 September 2009; Label: Decca / Universal; Formats: CD, digital download	20	—	95	9	—	—	
Paradiso (with Ennio Morricone)	Released: 18 April 2011; Label: Decca / Universal; Formats: CD, digital download	1	—	13	1	—	—	RMNZ: Gold
Hushabye	Released: 14 June 2013; Label: Decca / Universal; Formats: CD, digital download	14	—	35	—	—	—	

== Compilations and other albums ==
Year	Album title	Notes	Region
2000	Walking in the Air	Westenra's debut CD; very limited public release around Christchurch, NZ (mostly a memento for family and friends; self-released, in 2 varieties: one of 70 copies as Hayley Dee Westenra, the other of 1000 copies).	New Zealand
2004	Wuthering Heights	Referred to as a mini-album in her discography.	Japan
2006	Odyssey 2nd edition	Second edition of Odyssey that contains several new tracks.	UK
2006	Crystal	Compiled with tracks from Odyssey and Pure; also known in Japan as Classical Favorites.	Japan
2006	Hayley Westenra	A self-titled compilation album comprising tracks from Odyssey and Pure.	Asia
2007	The Best of Hayley Westenra	Compiled with tracks from Treasure and Odyssey.	Japan
2007	Prayer	A film-themed compilation that contains songs that Westenra has sung for movies and media and songs that were not previously released in Japan.	Japan
2008	River of Dreams: The Very Best of Hayley Westenra	Westenra's first European greatest hits compilation that compiled tracks from Treasure, Odyssey and Pure with a few newly recorded tracks. The NZ special edition of this album contains a bonus CD. The album peaked at No. 2 on the UK Classical Chart, No. 24 on UK Albums Chart and 13th on the New Zealand Albums Chart. It was certified Platinum in NZ and Silver in the UK.	UK and New Zealand
2009	Winter Magic (Japanese: Fuyu No Kagayaki – Koibito Tachi No Pure Voice; 冬の輝き – 恋人たちのピュア・ヴォイス)	Japanese special edition of Winter Magic that was released in Asia to coincide with her 2009 tour of Japan.	Japan
2010	The Best of Pure Voice	Japan limited offer; the album reached 7th on the "Western Pop Chart of Taiwan" and reached the "Hollywood Charts" in 2010.	Japan
2012	The Best – Hayley Sings Japanese Songs	Compiled with greatest hits from her Japanese albums. Featuring covers of popular songs in Japan. Includes a few newly recorded covers.	Japan
2014	The Best	Originally released in Japan on 26 March 2014; her second release of greatest hits in Asia; in two editions, regular and limited.	Japan

== DVDs ==
Year	DVD title	Notes
2004	Live From New Zealand	A live HD video album (DVD) and PBS Great Performances special, recorded in St. James Theatre, Wellington. The DVD consists Westenra's live songs, mostly from Pure
2008	On Tour To Northern Ireland	A documentary film which was supported by UNICEF due to Westenra's charity choices and covers Westenra's 2008 tour to Northern Ireland. After 2010, the sales of the DVD turned withdrew for some reasons

=== with Celtic Woman ===
Year	Album details	Peak chart positions	Certifications (sales thresholds)
Year	Album details	US	Certifications (sales thresholds)
2007	Celtic Woman: A New Journey: Released: 30 January 2007; Label: Manhattan; Formats: CD, DVD	4	RIAA: Gold; RIAA: 2× Platinum (DVD)

== Singles and EPs ==
=== Singles ===
Year	Single title	Region
2003	"Amazing Grace"	Japan
2005	"Wiegenlied"	Japan
2009	"Tsubomi"	Japan
2009	"Nemunoki no Komori Uta"	Japan

=== EPs ===
Year	EP title	Region
2004	Wiegenlied	Japan
2004	Amazing Grace	Japan

== Contributions ==
Year	Featured in	Notes
2003	Russell Watson 'The Voice'	Sang "I Dreamed a Dream" and a duet with Watson on the song "Pokarekare Ana"
2004	Nussknacker und Mausekönig Soundtrack	Sang "Peaches and Creamy World"
2005	Mulan II Soundtrack	Sang "Here Beside Me"
2005	The Merchant of Venice Soundtrack	Sang "Bridal Ballad"
2005	Lilo & Stitch 2	Sang "Always"
2005	The Choirboys The Choirboys	Sang Do You Hear What I Hear? with The Choirboys
2005	Aled Jones The Christmas Album	Sang Silent Night with Aled Jones
2006	The New World soundtrack	Sang "Listen to the Wind" and some other vocals and scores
2007	Celtic Woman A New Journey	Joined the group and sang "The Sky and the Dawn and the Sun", "Over the Rainbow", "Beyond the Sea", "The Last Rose of Summer", "Spanish Lady", "Mo Ghile Mear" and "You Raise Me Up". She soloed "Scarborough Fair" and "Lascia ch'io pianga".
2007	West Side Story	Sang the part of Maria for the album's 50th anniversary and the album nominated for 2007 Grammy Award
2007	Endless Ocean	Various songs of her featured in the game, including "Prayer" and "Pokarekare Ana", etc.
2007	Flood Soundtrack	Sang the theme song, "Flood".
2007	Jekyll soundtrack	Performed the vocals for the series' theme song.
2007	Helmut Lotti The Crooners	Sang "There's a Sparkle in Your Eyes" with Helmut Lotti
2007	Russell Watson Outside In	Sang "Time to Say Goodbye" in a duet with Watson
2007	Ryōichi Hattori Tanjo 100 Shunen Kinen Tribute Album	Sang "Shirobara – White Rose"
2008	Mike Oldfield Music of the Spheres	Sang "On My Heart" and "On My Heart (reprise)"
2008	Mario Frangoulis Passione	Sang "Be My Love" in a duet with Frangoulis
2008	Jonathan AnsellTenor at the Movies	Sang "Un Giorno Per Noi" from Romeo And Juliet with Ansell
2008	Blake Where Do We Go from Here? (Japan release)	Sang "Where Do We Go from Here" with the band Blake
2008	Songs of Praise	Sang "Abide With Me", from her album Treasure
2008	Shadows From The Sky	Full-length movie being filmed in Northern Ireland, England, and Australia, scheduled for release in 2015. Hayley plays herself, and portions of her 2008 Northern Ireland concert are included.
2009	Paul Potts Passione	Sang "Sei Con Me" in a duet with Potts
2009	Nativity! soundtrack	Sang "Silent Night" from Winter Magic and "One Night, One Moment"
2009	Lee Mead Nothing Else Matters	Sang "When The Stars Go Blue" with in a duet with Mead
2009	Lesbian Vampire Killers soundtrack	Performed various vocalizes and themes
2009	various artists Bandaged together	Sang "All You Need Is Love"
2009	United Artists We Will Remember Them	Sang "We Will Remember Them" along with the United Artists
2009	Ronan Keating Winter Songs	Sang "It's Only Christmas" in a duet with Keating
2010	Karl Jenkins Gloria	Sang the solo in "I'll Make Music"
2010	The Central Band of the Royal Air Force Reach for the Skies	Sang Danny Boy
2010	We Will Remember Them Words & Music For Remembrance	Sang "The Future" and "They Tell Me" as spoken vocals
2010	Karl Jenkins The Armed Man: A Mass for Peace – 10th Anniversary Special Edition	Sang "For the Fallen", set to the poem by Laurence Binyon.
2010	Junichi Inagaki Otoko to onna 3	Sang "Olivia wo kikinagara" with Junichi Inagaki
2011	André Rieu And the Waltz Goes On	Sang "Dreaming of New Zealand"
2012	Gary Barlow and The Commonwealth Band Sing	Sang "Amazing Grace" and the album earned notable peaks on multiple charts
2014	The Gypsy Queens Lost in the Music	Sang "Parole Parole" with the band
2015	Plácido Domingo My Christmas	Sang "Loving Christmas With You" in a duet with Domingo
