= List of number-one albums from the 2000s (New Zealand) =

This is the Recorded Music NZ list of number-one albums in New Zealand during the 2000s decade. Hayley Westenra's international debut album Pure charted at number one for 20 weeks. Four of the number one albums of the year have been from New Zealand artists: Bic Runga, Brooke Fraser, Fat Freddy's Drop, and Billy T James. Norah Jones' debut album Come Away with Me charted at number one for 12 weeks and was the top selling album for 2002.

In New Zealand, Recorded Music NZ compiles the top 40 albums chart each Monday. Over-the-counter sales of both physical and digital formats make up the data. Certifications are awarded for the number of shipments to retailers. Gold certifications are awarded after 7,500 sales, and platinum certifications after 15,000.

The following albums were all number one in New Zealand in the 2000s.

== Number ones ==
Key
* – Number-one album of the year (Note: Annual charts are sourced from the RMNZ website.)
† – Album of New Zealand origin (Note: Whether or not a song is of New Zealand origin is determined by RMNZ)
‡ – Number-one album of the year, of New Zealand origin

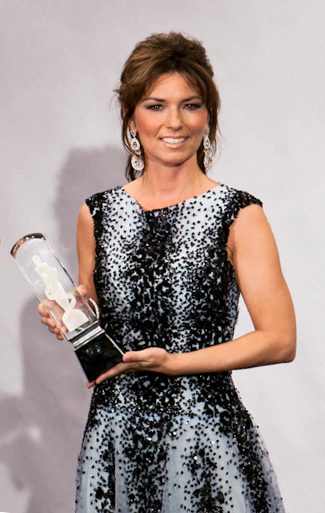
Shania Twain had the first No. 1 album of the 2000s, with Come on Over, and also had Up reach No 1 in 2002.

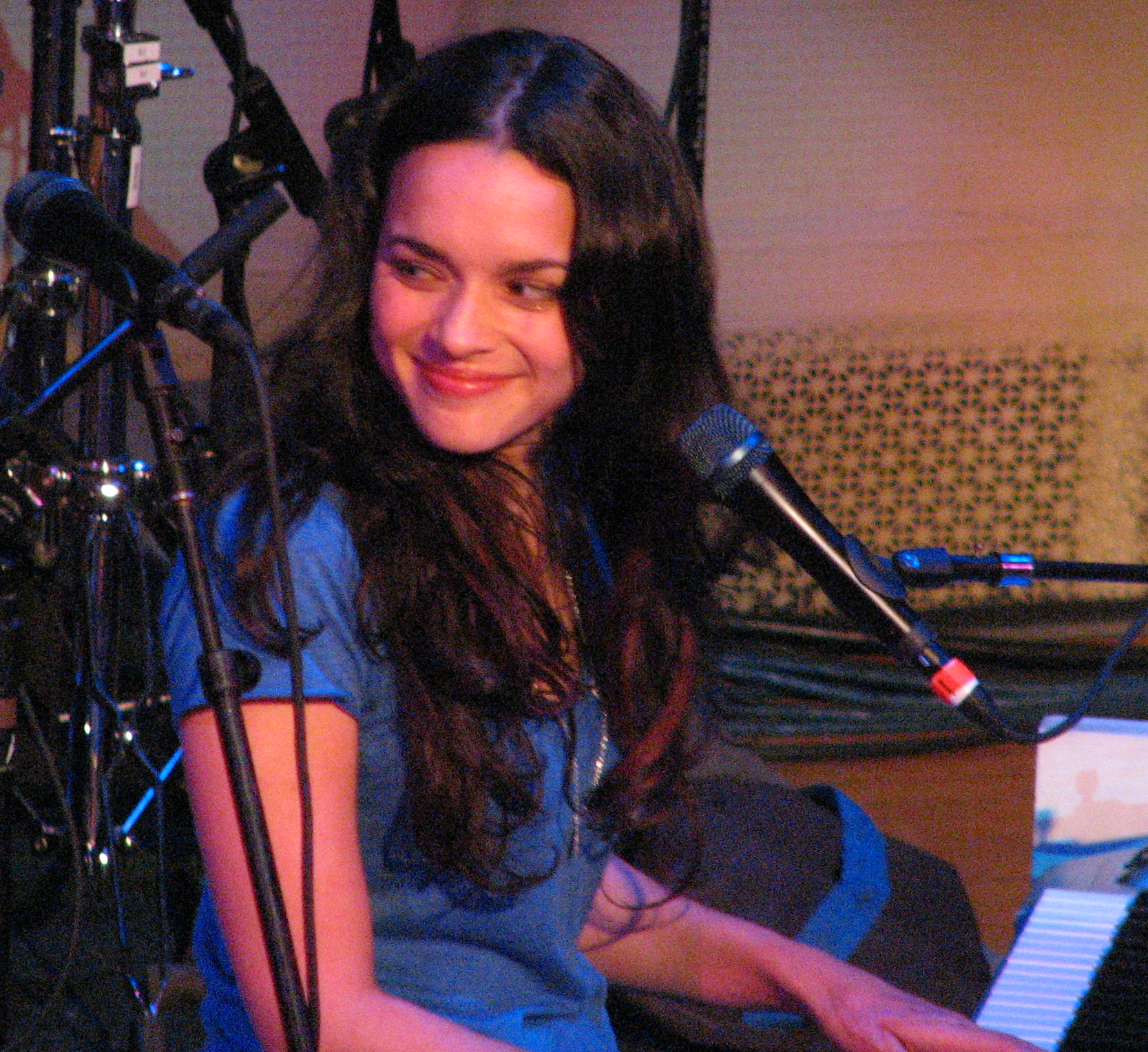
Norah Jones' debut album Come Away With Me was No. 1 for 13 weeks.

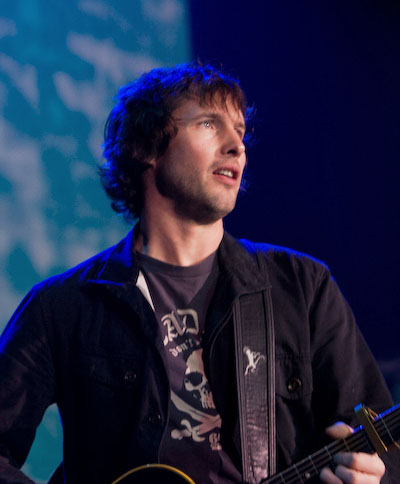
James' Blunt's internationally successful album Back to Bedlam was the top selling album of 2005.

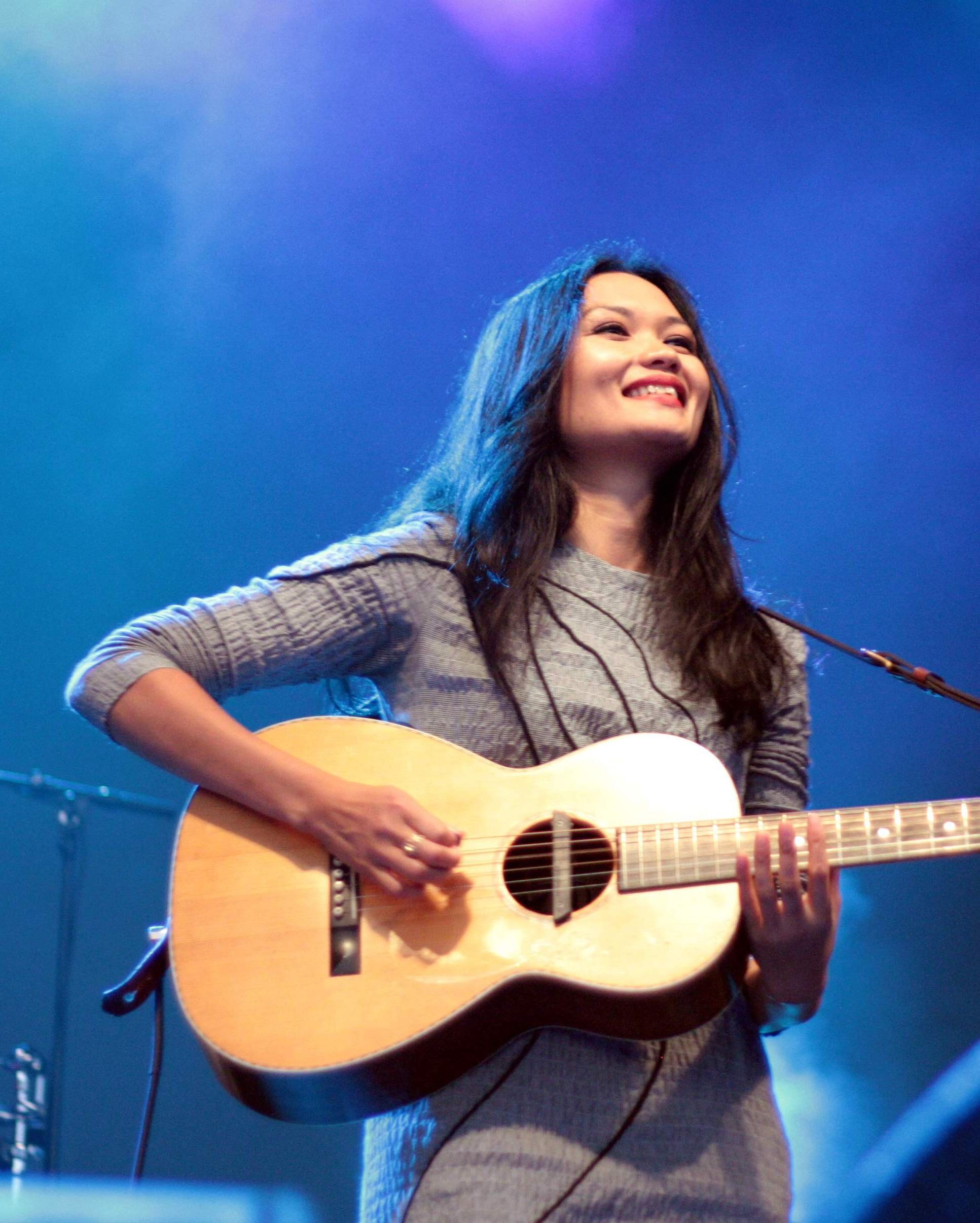
New Zealand singer-songwriter Bic Runga had two No. 1 albums, including Beautiful Collision, the top selling album of 2003.

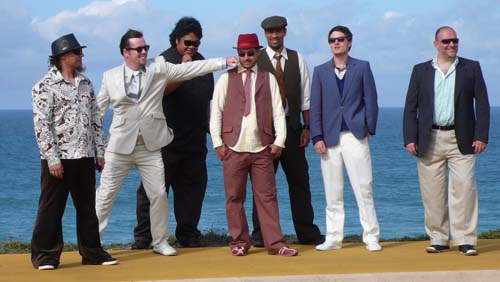
New Zealand band Fat Freddy's Drop spent 10 weeks at No. 1 with their album Based on a True Story, also the top-selling album of 2006.

Artist	Album	Weeks at number one	Reached number one	Certification
Summer break - no chart			2 January 2000	—N/a
Shania Twain	Come On Over	1	9 January 2000	Platinum x21
Red Hot Chili Peppers	Californication	1	16 January 2000	Platinum x8
Macy Gray	On How Life Is	4	23 January 2000	Platinum x4
Red Hot Chili Peppers	Californication	5	20 February 2000	Platinum x8
Santana	Supernatural	1	26 March 2000	Platinum x4
Moby	Play	3	2 April 2000	Platinum x7
Macy Gray	On How Life Is	1	23 April 2000	Platinum x4
Vengaboys	The Platinum Album	3	30 April 2000	Platinum x5
Bardot	Bardot	1	21 May 2000	Platinum
Pearl Jam	Binaural	1	28 May 2000	Gold
Moby	Play	1	4 June 2000	Platinum x7
Vengaboys	The Platinum Album	1	11 June 2000	Platinum x5
Eminem	The Marshall Mathers LP	4	18 June 2000	Platinum x5
Moby	Play	2	16 July 2000	Platinum x7
Anastacia	Not That Kind	3	30 July 2000	Platinum x3
Robbie Williams	The Ego Has Landed	1	20 August 2000	Platinum x9
Zed	Silencer (Bonus Disc)^{‡}	2	27 August 2000	Platinum x3
Robbie Williams	Sing When You're Winning	5	10 September 2000	Platinum x7
Radiohead	Kid A	2	15 October 2000	Gold
Limp Bizkit	Chocolate Starfish and the Hot Dog Flavored Water	2	29 October 2000	Platinum x5
U2	All That You Can't Leave Behind	2	12 November 2000	Platinum x3
The Beatles	1	5	26 November 2000	Platinum x15
Summer break - no chart			31 December 2000	—N/a
Artist	Album	Weeks at number one	Reached number one	Certification
The Beatles	1	3	7 January 2001	Platinum x15
Shaggy	Hot Shot	2	28 January 2001	Platinum x4
The Hollies	Greatest Hits	2	11 February 2001	—
Shaggy	Hot Shot	1	25 February 2001	Platinum x4
Dido	No Angel	4	4 March 2001	Platinum x5
Neil Finn	One Nil^{‡}	1	1 April 2001	Gold
Dido	No Angel	1	8 April 2001	Platinum x5
Shaggy	Hot Shot	1	15 April 2001	Platinum x4
Dido	No Angel	4	22 April 2001	Platinum x5
Hayley Westenra	Hayley Westenra^{‡}	4	13 May 2001	Platinum x3
Soundtrack	Moulin Rouge! Music from Baz Luhrmann's Film	1	17 July 2001	Platinum
Radiohead	Amnesiac	1	24 June 2001	—
Staind	Break the Cycle	4	1 July 2001	Platinum x2
Hear'Say	Hear'Say	1	22 July 2001	Platinum
Linkin Park	Hybrid Theory	1	29 July 2001	Platinum x5
Soundtrack	Bridget Jones's Diary	3	5 August 2001	Platinum x2
Salmonella Dub	Inside the Dub Plates^{‡}	1	26 August 2001	Platinum x2
Soundtrack	Bridget Jones's Diary	1	2 September 2001	Platinum x2
Elvis Presley	The 50 Greatest Hits	1	9 September 2001	Platinum
Che Fu	Navigator^{‡}	3	16 September 2001	Platinum x2
Live	V	1	9 October 2001	Gold
Anika Moa	Thinking Room^{‡}	2	14 October 2001	Platinum
The Feelers	Communicate^{‡}	1	28 October 2001	Platinum
Stellar	Magic Line^{‡}	1	4 November 2001	Platinum
Dr. Hook & The Medicine Show	Greatest Hits	1	11 November 2001	Platinum x2
Pink Floyd	Echoes: The Best of Pink Floyd	1	18 November 2001	Platinum x3
Robbie Williams	Swing When You're Winning	3	25 November 2001	Platinum x5
Bee Gees	Their Greatest Hits: The Record	1	16 December 2001	Platinum
Robbie Williams	Swing When You're Winning	1	23 December 2001	Platinum x5
Summer break - no chart			30 December 2001	—N/a
Artist	Album	Weeks at number one	Reached number one	Certification
Summer break - no chart			5 January 2001	—N/a
Robbie Williams	Swing When You're Winning	1	13 January 2002	Platinum x5
Bee Gees	Their Greatest Hits: The Record	1	20 January 2002	Platinum
Herbs	Listen: The Very Best Of^{‡}	1	27 January 2002	Platinum
Nickelback	Silver Side Up	1	3 February 2002	Gold
The Chemical Brothers	Come with Us	1	10 February 2002	Gold
Russell Watson	Encore - NZ Edition	2	17 February 2002	Platinum
Groove Armada	Goodbye Country (Hello Nightclub)	1	3 March 2002	Platinum
Ja Rule	Pain Is Love	4	10 March 2002	Platinum
Celine Dion	A New Day Has Come	1	7 April 2002	Platinum x2
Russell Watson	Encore - NZ Edition	1	14 April 2002	Platinum
Celine Dion	A New Day Has Come	5	21 April 2002	Platinum x2
Moby	18	2	26 May 2002	Platinum
Eminem	The Eminem Show	5	9 June 2002	Platinum x9
Bic Runga	Beautiful Collision^{‡}	1	14 July 2002	Platinum x10
Red Hot Chili Peppers	By the Way	1	21 July 2002	Platinum x2
Ronan Keating	Destination	1	28 July 2002	Platinum
Eminem	The Eminem Show	1	4 August 2002	Platinum x9
Norah Jones	Come Away with Me	2	11 August 2002	Platinum x11
Little River Band	Greatest Hits	1	25 August 2002	Platinum x3
Pacifier	Pacifier^{‡}	1	1 September 2002	Platinum
Little River Band	Greatest Hits	3	8 September 2002	Platinum x3
Avril Lavigne	Let Go	1	29 September 2002	Platinum x5
Elvis Presley	ELV1S: 30#1 Hits	2	6 September 2002	Platinum x3
Disturbed	Believe	1	20 October 2002	Gold
The Rolling Stones	Forty Licks	1	27 October 2002	Platinum x2
The Datsuns	The Datsuns^{‡}	1	3 November 2002	Gold
Blindspott	Blindspott^{‡}	1	10 November 2002	Platinum x2
U2	The Best of 1990–2000	3	17 November 2002	Platinum x4
Nesian Mystik	Polysaturated^{‡}	1	8 December 2002	Platinum x3
Shania Twain	Up!	1	15 December 2002	Platinum x3
U2	The Best of 1990–2000	1	22 December 2002	Platinum x4
Summer break - no chart			29 December 2002	—N/a
Artist	Album	Weeks at number one	Reached number one	Certification
Summer break - no chart			5 January 2003	—N/a
U2	The Best of 1990–2000	1	12 January 2003	Platinum x4
Jack Johnson	Brushfire Fairytales	2	19 January 2003	Platinum x3
Soundtrack	8 Mile	3	2 February 2003	—
Norah Jones	Come Away with Me	7	23 February 2003	Platinum x11
Linkin Park	Meteora	3	13 April 2003	Platinum x3
Norah Jones	Come Away with Me	4	4 May 2003	Platinum x11
Jack Johnson	On and On	1	25 May 2003	Platinum x2
Bic Runga	Beautiful Collision^{‡}	3	1 June 2003	Platinum x10
Metallica	St. Anger	1	22 June 2003	Platinum x2
Bic Runga	Beautiful Collision^{‡}	3	29 June 2003	Platinum x10
Elemeno P	Love & Disrespect^{‡}	1	20 July 2003	Platinum x2
Bic Runga	Beautiful Collision^{‡}	1	27 July 2003	Platinum x10
Hayley Westenra	Pure^{‡}	4	3 August 2003	Platinum x11
Salmonella Dub	One Drop East^{‡}	1	31 August 2003	Platinum
Hayley Westenra	Pure^{‡}	1	7 September 2003	Platinum x11
Michael Bublé	Michael Bublé	1	14 September 2003	Platinum x2
Hayley Westenra	Pure^{‡}	1	21 September 2003	Platinum x11
A Perfect Circle	Thirteenth Step	1	28 September 2003	Gold
Hayley Westenra	Pure^{‡}	2	5 October 2003	Platinum x11
Dido	Life for Rent	1	19 October 2003	Platinum x4
Hayley Westenra	Pure^{‡}	1	26 October 2003	Platinum x11
Scribe	The Crusader^{‡}	1	2 November 2003	Platinum x4
Hayley Westenra	Pure^{‡}	1	9 November 2003	Platinum x11
Brooke Fraser	What to Do with Daylight^{‡}	1	16 November 2003	Platinum x7
Hayley Westenra	Pure^{‡}	5	23 November 2003	Platinum x11
Summer break - no chart			28 December 2003	—N/a
Artist	Album	Weeks at number one	Reached number one	Certification
Summer break - no chart			4 January 2004	—N/a
Hayley Westenra	Pure^{‡}	5	11 January 2004	Platinum x11
Incubus	A Crow Left of the Murder...	1	15 January 2004	Platinum
Norah Jones	Feels like Home	6	22 February 2004	Platinum x3
Guns N' Roses	Greatest Hits	5	4 April 2004	Platinum x6
D12	D12 World	1	3 May 2004	Platinum
Amici Forever	The Opera Band	1	10 May 2004	Platinum x2
Adeaze	Always and for Real^{‡}	1	17 May 2004	Platinum x2
Amici Forever	The Opera Band	2	24 May 2004	Platinum x2
Usher	Confessions	2	7 June 2004	Platinum x2
Ben Lummis	One Road^{‡}	2	21 June 2004	Platinum x2
Usher	Confessions	4	5 July 2004	Platinum x2
Goldenhorse	Riverhead^{‡}	3	2 August 2004	Platinum x3
Brooke Fraser	What to Do with Daylight^{‡}	1	23 August 2004	Platinum x7
Finn Brothers	Everyone Is Here^{‡}	3	30 August 2004	Platinum x3
Yulia	Into the West^{‡}	4	20 September 2004	Platinum x4
Brooke Fraser	What to Do with Daylight^{‡}	1	18 October 2004	Platinum x7
Robbie Williams	Greatest Hits	4	25 October 2004	Platinum x2
Eminem	Encore	1	22 November 2004	Platinum x4
U2	How to Dismantle an Atomic Bomb	3	29 November 2004	Platinum x3
Eminem	Encore	3	20 December 2004	Platinum x4
Artist	Album	Weeks at number one	Reached number one	Certification
Live	Awake: The Best of Live	2	10 January 2005	Platinum
Maroon 5	Songs About Jane	6	24 January 2005	Platinum x5
Jack Johnson	In Between Dreams	1	7 March 2005	Platinum x4
50 Cent	The Massacre	1	14 March 2005	Platinum
Jack Johnson	In Between Dreams	7	21 March 2005	Platinum x4
Fat Freddy's Drop	Based on a True Story^{‡}	2	9 May 2005	Platinum x8
System of a Down	Mezmerize	1	23 May 2005	Platinum
Audioslave	Out of Exile	1	30 May 2005	Platinum
The Black Eyed Peas	Monkey Business	1	6 June 2005	Platinum x4
Coldplay	X&Y	1	13 June 2005	Platinum x4
Foo Fighters	In Your Honor	3	20 June 2005	Platinum x4
The Offspring	Greatest Hits	4	11 July 2005	Platinum
Amici Forever	Defined	1	8 August 2005	Platinum
Hayley Westenra	Odyssey^{‡}	2	16 August 2005	Platinum x3
James Blunt	Back to Bedlam	5	29 August 2005	Platinum x7
Crazy Frog	Crazy Hits	2	3 October 2005	Platinum x3
Disturbed	Ten Thousand Fists	1	17 October 2005	Gold
Crazy Frog	Crazy Hits	1	24 October 2005	Platinum x3
Robbie Williams	Intensive Care	1	31 October 2005	Platinum
James Blunt	Back to Bedlam	1	7 November 2005	Platinum x7
Il Divo	Ancora	1	14 November 2005	Platinum x2
Fat Freddy's Drop	Based on a True Story^{‡}	1	21 November 2005	Platinum x8
System of a Down	Hypnotize	1	25 November 2005	Platinum
Bic Runga	Birds^{‡}	1	5 December 2005	Platinum x3
Eminem	Curtain Call: The Hits	4	12 December 2005	Platinum x5
Artist	Album	Weeks at number one	Reached number one	Certification
Fat Freddy's Drop	Based on a True Story^{‡}	7	9 January 2006	Platinum x8
Jack Johnson	Sing-A-Longs and Lullabies for the Film Curious George	1	27 February 2006	Platinum
James Blunt	Back to Bedlam	3	6 March 2006	Platinum x7
Ben Harper	Both Sides Of The Gun	1	27 March 2006	Platinum
James Blunt	Back to Bedlam	1	3 April 2006	Platinum x7
Yulia	Montage^{‡}	1	10 April 2006	Platinum
James Blunt	Back to Bedlam	1	17 April 2006	Platinum x7
Nickelback	All The Right Reasons	2	26 April 2006	Platinum x3
Tool	10,000 Days	1	6 May 2006	Platinum
James Blunt	Back to Bedlam	1	15 May 2006	Platinum x7
Red Hot Chili Peppers	Stadium Arcadium	2	22 June 2006	Platinum x3
Blindspott	End The Silence^{‡}	1	5 June 2006	Platinum
Pussycat Dolls	PCD	1	12 June 2006	Platinum x2
Gnarls Barkley	St Elsewhere	2	19 June 2006	Gold
Pussycat Dolls	PCD	1	3 July 2006	Platinum x2
Red Hot Chili Peppers	Stadium Arcadium	1	10 July 2006	Platinum x3
Nelly Furtado	Loose	1	17 July 2006	Platinum x2
The Black Seeds	Into the Dojo^{‡}	5	24 July 2006	Platinum x2
Various artists	High School Musical OST	1	28 August 2006	Platinum
Bob Dylan	Modern Times	1	4 September 2006	Platinum
Audioslave	Revelations	1	11 September 2006	Gold
Snow Patrol	Eyes Open	3	18 September 2006	Platinum x3
The Killers	Sam's Town	1	9 October 2006	Platinum
Rod Stewart	Still the Same… Great Rock Classics of Our Time	2	16 October 2006	Platinum x2
My Chemical Romance	The Black Parade	2	30 October 2006	Platinum
Foo Fighters	Skin And Bones	1	13 November 2006	Platinum
The Feelers	One World^{‡}	1	20 November 2006	Platinum
U2	18 Singles	2	27 November 2006	Platinum x4
Brooke Fraser	Albertine^{‡}	1	11 December 2006	Platinum x4
U2	18 Singles	2	18 December 2006	Platinum x4
Artist	Album	Weeks at number one	Reached number one	Certification
Eminem	Eminem Presents the Re-Up	1	1 January 2007	Platinum x2
ABBA	Number Ones	3	8 January 2007	Gold
J. J. Cale and Eric Clapton	The Road to Escondido	1	29 January 2007	Platinum
Norah Jones	Not Too Late	1	5 February 2007	Gold
Fall Out Boy	Infinity on High	6	12 February 2007	Platinum
Hayley Westenra	Treasure^{‡}	2	26 March 2007	Platinum x2
Kings of Leon	Because of the Times	1	9 April 2007	Platinum
Akon	Konvicted	2	16 April 2007	Platinum x2
Hayley Westenra	Treasure^{‡}	3	30 April 2007	Platinum x2
Linkin Park	Minutes to Midnight	2	21 May 2007	Platinum x2
Hollie Smith	Long Player^{‡}	2	4 June 2007	Platinum
The Traveling Wilburys	The Traveling Wilburys Collection	4	18 June 2007	Platinum
The Smashing Pumpkins	Zeitgeist	2	16 July 2007	Gold
Pink	I'm Not Dead (Tour Edition)	1	30 July 2007	Platinum
Paul Potts	One Chance	6	6 August 2007	Platinum x3
50 Cent	Curtis	1	17 September 2007	Gold
James Blunt	All the Lost Souls	1	24 September 2007	Platinum
Foo Fighters	Echoes, Silence, Patience & Grace	3	1 October 2007	Platinum x2
Kora	Kora^{‡}	1	22 October 2007	Platinum
Various artists	Outrageous Fortune: Westside Rules^{‡}	1	29 October 2007	Platinum x2
Eagles	Long Road Out of Eden	2	5 November 2007	Platinum x3
Led Zeppelin	Mothership	7	19 November 2007	Platinum x3
Artist	Album	Weeks at number one	Reached number one	Certification
OpShop	Second Hand Planet^{‡}	3	6 January 2008	Platinum x3
Rod Stewart	The Story So Far: The Very Best of Rod Stewart	1	28 January 2008	Platinum x4
Leona Lewis	Spirit	1	4 February 2008	Platinum
Jack Johnson	Sleep Through the Static	3	11 February 2008	Platinum
Amy Winehouse	Back To Black: Deluxe Edition	7	3 March 2008	Platinum x3
Duffy	Rockferry	1	21 April 2008	Platinum x3
Shihad	Beautiful Machine^{‡}	1	28 April 2008	Gold
Flight of the Conchords	Flight of the Conchords^{‡}	1	5 May 2008	Platinum
Westlife	Unbreakable: 2008 NZ Tour Edition	1	12 May 2008	Platinum x2
Duffy	Rockferry	1	19 May 2008	Platinum x3
Neil Diamond	Home Before Dark	2	26 May 2008	Gold
Disturbed	Indestructible	2	9 June 2008	Platinum
Coldplay	Viva la Vida or Death and All His Friends	4	23 June 2008	Platinum x2
Mamma Mia cast	Mamma Mia: The Movie	2	21 July 2008	Platinum x2
Phil Collins	... Hits	1	4 August 2008	Platinum x3
Mamma Mia cast	Mamma Mia: The Movie	3	11 August 2008	Platinum x2
Slipknot	All Hope Is Gone	1	1 September 2008	Gold
Mamma Mia Cast	Mamma Mia: The Movie	1	8 September 2008	Platinum x2
Metallica	Death Magnetic	2	15 September 2008	Platinum
Kings of Leon	Only by the Night	4	29 September 2008	Platinum x5
AC/DC	Black Ice	1	27 October 2008	Platinum x2
Funhouse	Pink	2	3 November 2008	Platinum x3
The Feelers	The Best: 1998-2008^{‡}	2	17 November 2008	Platinum x2
Guns N' Roses	Chinese Democracy	1	1 December 2008	Platinum
High School Musical cast	High School Musical 3: Senior Year	1	8 December 2008	Platinum
Billy T. James	The Comic Genius of Billy T. James^{‡}	6	15 December 2008	Platinum x4
Artist	Album	Weeks at number one	Reached number one	Certification
Basshunter	Now You're Gone – The Album	1	26 January 2009	Platinum
Bruce Springsteen	Working on a Dream	1	2 February 2009	—
Various	Twilight OST	1	9 February 2009	Platinum
Basshunter	Now You're Gone – The Album	1	16 February 2009	Platinum
Kings of Leon	Only by the Night: Tour Edition	2	23 February 2009	Platinum x5
U2	No Line on the Horizon	2	9 March 2009	Platinum
Taylor Swift	Fearless	1	23 March 2009	Platinum x3
Kings of Leon	Only by the Night: Tour Edition	3	30 March 2009	Platinum x5
Paul Potts	Passione	1	20 April 2009	Gold
Ronan Keating	Songs For My Mother	3	27 April 2009	Platinum
Green Day	21st Century Breakdown	1	18 May 2009	Platinum
Eminem	Relapse	1	25 May 2009	Platinum
Fat Freddy's Drop	Dr Boondigga and the Big BW^{‡}	5	1 June 2009	Platinum x2
Michael Jackson	Thriller 25	1	6 July 2009	Platinum x12
Michael Jackson	Number Ones	1	13 July 2009	Platinum x4
Various	Hannah Montana: The Movie OST	1	20 July 2009	Platinum
Michael Jackson	The Essential Michael Jackson	2	29 July 2009	Platinum x2
The Black Eyed Peas	The E.N.D.	2	10 August 2009	Platinum x2
Fly My Pretties	A Story^{‡}	1	24 August 2009	—
The Black Eyed Peas	The E.N.D.	1	31 August 2009	Platinum x2
Roger Whittaker	Greatest Hits: The Golden Age of Roger Whittaker	1	7 September 2009	—
The Black Eyed Peas	The E.N.D.	1	14 September 2009	Platinum x2
Muse	The Resistance	1	21 September 2009	Platinum
Pearl Jam	Backspacer	1	28 September 2009	Gold
Paramore	Brand New Eyes	2	5 October 2009	Gold
Ladyhawke	Ladyhawke: Collector's Edition^{‡}	1	19 October 2009	Platinum
Gin	Holy Smoke^{‡}	1	26 October 2009	Platinum x4
Michael Jackson	This Is It	1	2 November 2009	Platinum x2
Foo Fighters	Greatest Hits	1	9 November 2009	Platinum
Shapeshifter	The System Is a Vampire^{‡}	2	16 November 2009	Platinum
Susan Boyle	I Dreamed a Dream	5	30 November 2009	Platinum x11
