= River of Dreams: The Very Best of Hayley Westenra =

River of Dreams

Greatest hits album by Hayley Westenra
- Released: 10 November 2008
- Genres: Classical, Crossover
- Label: Universal Records

Hayley Westenra chronology
Hayley Sings Japanese Songs (2008)	River of Dreams (2008)	Hayley Sings Japanese Songs 2 (2009)

River of Dreams: The Very Best of Hayley Westenra is a Greatest hits album released in UK and New Zealand by Christchurch soprano Hayley Westenra.

River of Dreams contains selections from her three best-selling Decca albums Pure, Odyssey and Treasure, combined with four newly recorded songs. Westenra's distinctive vocals were showcased through classical, traditional, and easy listening repertoires.

The New Zealand Special Edition of this album includes a second CD, featuring nine special fan favorites.

== Track listing ==
United Kingdom version

1. Pokarekare Ana
2. River of Dreams (adapted from "Winter" from Vivaldi's Four Seasons)
3. Dell'amore non si sa (with Andrea Bocelli)
4. Shenandoah
5. The Water Is Wide
6. Songbird
7. Both Sides, Now
8. Ave Maria (Caccini)
9. Benedictus
10. Amazing Grace
11. Danny Boy
12. Summer Rain
13. Never Say Goodbye (Adapted from "Pavane")
14. O Mio Babbino Caro
15. May It Be
16. Ave Maria (Bach/Gounod)
17. Now Is the Hour (Po Atarau/Haere Ra)

New Zealand version, with special edition Bonus disc

Disc 1

1. Pokarekare Ana
2. River of Dreams (adapted from "Winter")
3. Dell'amore non si sa (with Andrea Bocelli)
4. Shenandoah
5. Who Painted the Moon Black
6. The Water Is Wide
7. Songbird
8. Both Sides, Now
9. Ave Maria (Caccini)
10. Benedictus
11. Amazing Grace
12. Danny Boy
13. Summer Rain
14. Never Say Goodbye (adapted from "Pavane")
15. O Mio Babbino Caro
16. May it Be
17. Majesty
18. Ave Maria (Bach/Gounod)
19. Now Is the Hour (Po Atarau/Haere Ra)

Disc 2:

1. Hine E Hine
2. Mary Did You Know
3. Silent Night
4. Away in a Manger
5. Scarborough Fair
6. Abide with Me
7. E Pari Ra
8. Santa Lucia
9. God Defend New Zealand

== Release history ==
Region	Date	Label	Format	Catalogue
United Kingdom	27 October 2008	Universal Classics	CD/Download	
New Zealand	17 November 2008	Universal New Zealand	CD/Download	

== Charts ==
Chart (2008–2016)	Peak position
Irish Albums (IRMA)	74
New Zealand Albums (RMNZ)	13
UK Albums (OCC)	24
UK Classical Albums (OCC)	2

== Certifications and sales ==
Region	Certification	Certified units/sales
New Zealand (RMNZ)	Platinum	15,000^{^}
Taiwan	—	20,000 (Note: 2009 year-end sales, according to Taiwan Institute of Economic Research.)
United Kingdom (BPI)	Silver	60,000^{*}
^{*} Sales figures based on certification alone.^{^} Shipments figures based on certification alone.
