= Live from New Zealand =

Live From New Zealand

Live album by Hayley Westenra
- Released: 9 December 2004
- Genre: classical crossover
- Length: 70 minutes
- Label: Decca

Hayley Westenra chronology
Pure (2003)	Live From New Zealand (2004)	Odyssey (2005)

Live From New Zealand is a live high quality video album (DVD) and PBS Great Performances special by Christchurch, New Zealand soprano Hayley Westenra and featured duet with baritone Teddy Tahu Rhodes and soprano Sophie Westenra. It was recorded in St. James Theatre, Wellington and published in 2004.

The special consists mostly of songs from her debut international album, Pure and some bonus videos:"I Dreamed a Dream"(live in concert), "Pokarekare Ana", "100% Pure New Zealand" and "interviews from her family, neighbours and Christchurch school teachers".

== Track listing ==
No.	Title	Writer(s)	Length
1.	"Pokarekare Ana"
2.	"River of Dreams"	Charlie Dore
3.	"In Trutina"
4.	"Across the Universe of Time (with Sophie Westenra)"	Sarah Class
5.	"May It Be"	Enya, Nicky Ryan, and Roma Ryan
6.	"Beat of Your Heart"	George Martin and Giles Martin
7.	"Aria (Cantilena)"
8.	"Who Painted the Moon Black?"	Sonia Aletta Nel
9.	"How Many Stars? (with Teddy Tahu Rhodes)"	A.R. Rahman and Don Black
10.	"Ave Maria"
11.	"Down To The River (with the Musical Island Boys and the Elim Gospel Choir)"	Traditional
12.	"Amazing Grace"	John Newton
13.	"Benedictus (with the Wellington Cathedral Choir)"	Karl Jenkins
14.	"Mary Did You Know?"
15.	"Both Sides Now"	Joni Mitchell
16.	"Never Say Goodbye"
17.	"Wuthering Heights"	Kate Bush
18.	"Hine E Hine ("Maiden, O Maiden") (with Teddy Tahu Rhodes)"	Fanny Rose Howie "Princess Te Rangi Pai"
Total length:			70 min
