= The Best of Pure Voice =

Studio album by Hayley Westenra
- Released: 29 June 2010
- Genre: Classical, Traditional music, Classical Crossover
- Label: Decca Records

The Best of Pure Voice is an international album by Christchurch, New Zealand soprano Hayley Westenra. It was released in both standard and limited editions in Japan, and in other Asian areas as a regular CD, on 29 June 2010.

The Best of Pure Voice includes classical songs such as Amazing Grace, Danny Boy, and Ave Maria. There are also international duets featured, with Andrea Bocelli, Russell Watson, Minako Honda, and Blake.

The album climbed to the top of the Taiwan classical music charts after release and reached #3 on the Hollywood charts in 2010.

== Track listing ==
1. "Amazing Grace"
2. "Shiroi Irowa Koibitono Iro"
3. "I Am A Thousand Winds"
4. "Summer Rain"
5. "Prayer"
6. "Ave Maria (Caccini)"
7. "Dell`Amore Non Si Sa" (with Andrea Bocelli)
8. "Time to Say Goodbye" (with Russell Watson)
9. "Ave Maria (Bach)"
10. "Pokarekare Ana"
11. "Danny Boy"
12. "Songbird"
13. "Now Is The Hour" (Po Atarau/Haere Ra)
14. "Amazing Grace" (with Minako Honda)
15. "Where Do We Go From Here" (with Blake)
