= Rona Hurley =

New Zealand tobacco grower and buyer

Rona Marjory Hurley (née Hamilton, 2 October 1897 – 11 June 1985) was a New Zealand tobacco grower and buyer. Of Māori descent, she identified with the Ngāti Porou and Te Whānau-ā-Apanui iwi. She was born in Gisborne, New Zealand, on 2 October 1897. She was the granddaughter of Thomas William Porter and Herewaka Porourangi Potai, and the niece of Fanny Rose Howie.
