= My Gift to You =

My Gift to You may refer to:

- My Gift to You (Hayley Westenra album), 2001
- My Gift to You (Alexander O'Neal album), 1988
- "My Gift to You", a song by Korn from Follow the Leader
