= Thomas William Porter =

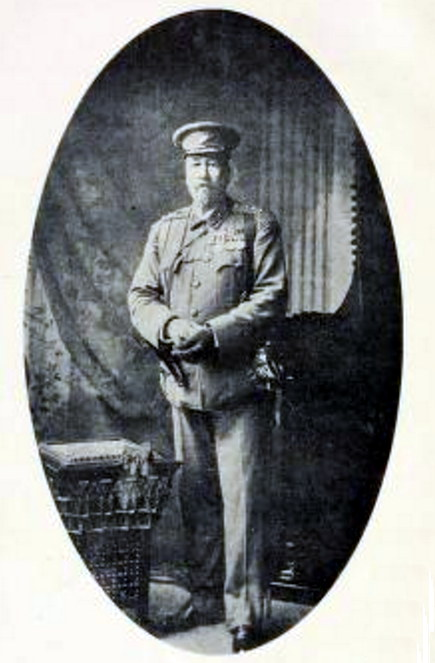
- Colonel T. W. Porter
- Born: Thomas William Potter; 2 August 1843; Surrey, England
- Died: 12 November 1920 (aged 77); Wellington, New Zealand
- Burial place: Karori Cemetery

Thomas William Porter (born Thomas William Potter; 2 August 1843 – 12 November 1920) was a New Zealand soldier and land purchase officer.

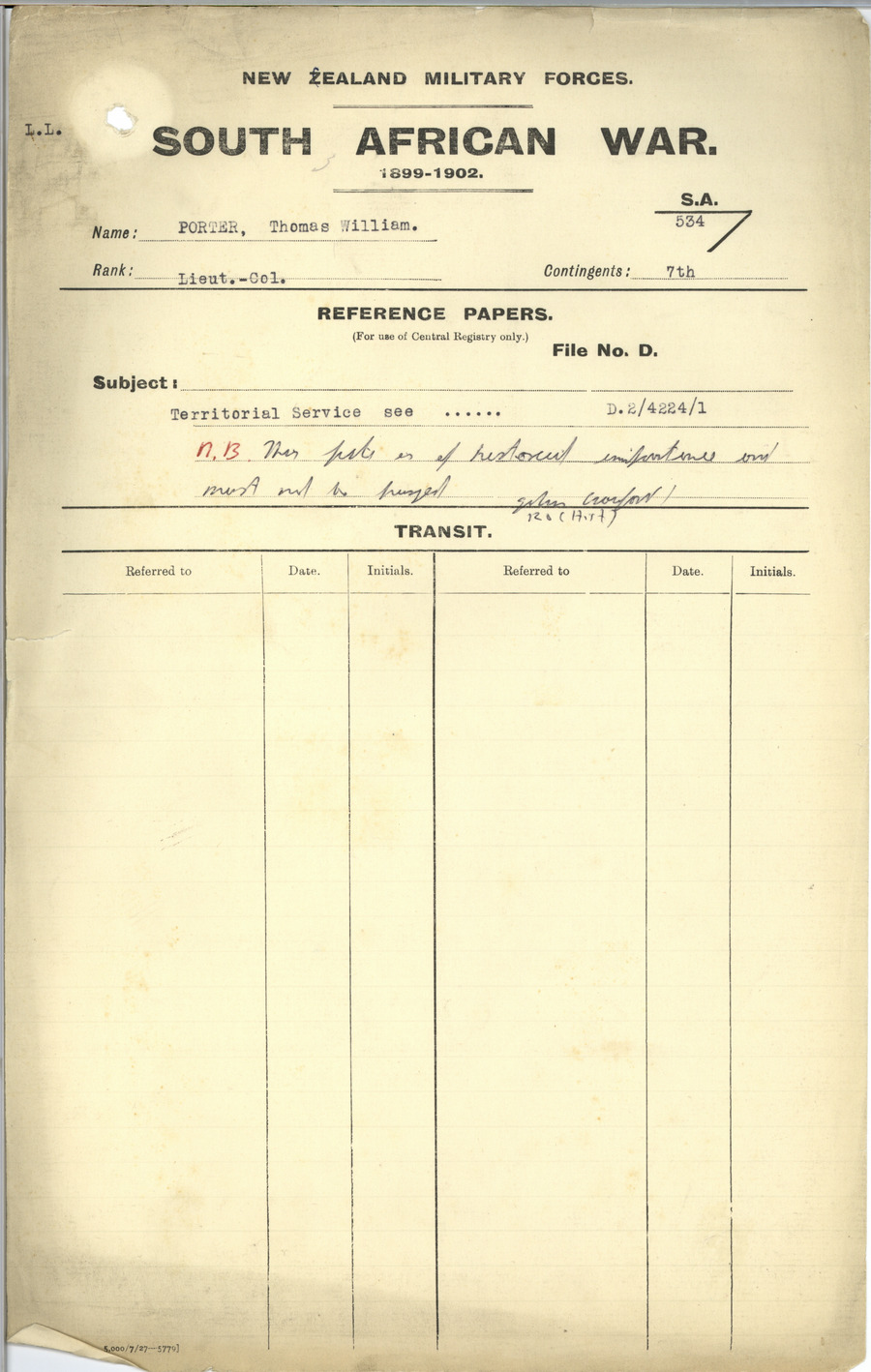
Thomas William Porter, New Zealand Military Forces personnel file (1899–1902)

He was born in Streatham, Surrey, England in 1843. He married Herewaka Porourangi Potai. Their children included the singer and composer Fanny Rose Howie and their grandchildren included Rona Hurley.

He was some time, before retiring in 1908, Acting Undersecretary for Defense. He was also vice-chairman of the Historical Section of the Wellington Philosophical Society. He was the author of a book on the East Coast Maori legends. He also completed a history of the Maori war with Te Kooti.

In 1878 he was elected mayor of Gisborne. He was re-elected unopposed in 1879 and 1880. He had intended to contest the East Coast electorate in the 1879 election but pulled out shortly before. In 1880 he was challenged for the mayoralty by former mayor William Fitzgerald Crawford, and won by just three votes. He retired the mayoralty in order to run for parliament in the 1881 election, in which he placed third. He returned to the mayoralty unopposed in 1883. He retired again in 1884 and endorsed recently defeated MP Cecil de Lautour for the mayoralty. He was elected mayor again in 1886 following the resignation of Allan McDonald.

The day before his death on 12 November 1920, parliament had passed a bill to award Porter with a permanent pension of £200 a year.

== See also ==
- List of New Zealand units in the Second Boer War
