= Hayley Sings Japanese Songs =

Studio album by Hayley Westenra
- Released: 23 June 2008
- Genre: Japanese music
- Label: Universal Music Group

Hayley Westenra chronology
Treasure (2007)	Hayley Sings Japanese Songs (2008)	River of Dreams: The Very Best of Hayley Westenra (2008)

Hayley Sings Japanese Songs is an album by Christchurch, New Zealand soprano Hayley Westenra. The album contains Westenra's interpretations of traditional and popular contemporary Japanese songs. Some of the songs have been translated into English while others were kept in Japanese.

The album contains the Japanese version of Amazing Grace and is a duet between Hayley and the late Japanese singer Minako Honda. The song was released as a single in Japan and topped the Japanese International Singles Chart.

The album debuted at number 12 on the Japanese Albums Chart, but broke into the Top 10 in its second week of release.

== Track listing ==
No.	Title	Lyrics	Music	Original artist	Length
1.	"Amazing Grace" (Japanese version of Amazing Grace with Minako Honda; the first verse is in English)
2.	"Hanamizuki"			Yo Hitoto
3.	"Yuki no Hana"			Mika Nakashima
4.	"Shiroi Iro wa Koibito no Iro" (白い色は恋人の色, English version)			Betsy & Chris
5.	"Sen no Kaze ni Natte"			Man Arai
6.	"Hana" (The full title of the original song is "Subete no Hito no Kokoro ni Hana O" (Flowers for Your Heart))			Shoukichi Kina
7.	"Nada Sōsō"			Ryoko Moriyama
8.	"Tsubasa wo Kudasai" (翼をください)	山上路夫	村井邦彦	赤い鳥
9.	"Sotsugyou Shashin"
10.	"Jidai"
11.	"I Believe"			Ayaka
12.	"Shiroi Iro wa Koibito no Iro" (白い色は恋人の色, Japanese version, only available on deluxe SHM-CD and Taiwanese editions)			Betsy & Chris

== Release history ==
Region	Date	Label	Format	Catalogue
Japan	4 June 2008	Universal Japan	CD/Download	

== Charts ==
Chart (2008)	Peak Position
Japanese Album Charts	10
