= Andrea (Andrea Bocelli album) =

Studio album by Andrea Bocelli
- Released: November 9, 2004
- Genre: Pop; operatic pop
- Label: Sugar, Universal, Philips
- Producer: Leo Z, Mauro Malavasi, Celso Valli, Guy Chambers, Steve Power, Corrado Rustici, Peppe Vessicchio, Jack Lenz

Andrea Bocelli chronology
| Sentimento (2002) | Andrea (2004) | Amore (2006) |

Andrea is the tenth studio album released by Italian tenor Andrea Bocelli, in 2004. This album, being Bocelli's fifth pop release, peaked at number 1 on the Dutch Albums Top 100, stayed on that chart for 33 weeks, and ended up being certified Gold. The song "L'Attesa" was written by Italian singer Mango.

== Track listing ==
Standard version
| No. | Title | Writer(s) | Producer(s) | Length |
|---|---|---|---|---|
| 1. | "Dell'amore non si sa" | Andrea Sandri, Leo Z, Mauro Malavasi | Leo Z, Malavasi |
| 2. | "L'attesa" | Mango | Celso Valli |
| 3. | "Un nuovo giorno (The First Day of My Life)" | Guy Chambers, Enrique Iglesias, Alessandra Scuri, Beatrice Quattrini | Chambers, Steve Power |
| 4. | "Tu ci sei" | Francesco Sartori, Lucio Quarantotto | Corrado Rustici |
| 5. | "Semplicemente (canto per te)" (bonus track) | Maurizio Costanzo, Nick The Nightfly | Rustici |
| 6. | "Libertà" | Sartori, Alessio Bonomo | Valli |
| 7. | "Per noi" | Amedeo Minghi, Paolo Audino | Valli |
| 8. | "Le parole che non ti ho detto" | Giuliano Sangiorgi | Rustici |
| 9. | "Sin tu amor" (featuring Mario Reyes) | David Mario Reyes | Valli |
| 10. | "Sempre o mai" | Pier Paolo Guerrini, Andrea Bocelli | Valli |
| 11. | "In-canto" | Giuseppe Vessicchio, Bruno Lanza | Peppe Vessicchio |
| 12. | "Quante volte ti ho cercato" | Lucio Dalla | Valli |
| 13. | "Go Where Love Goes" (featuring Holly Stell) (bonus track) | Jack Lenz, Ashley Lenz, Ciro Dammicco | J. Lenz |

North American version
| No. | Title | Writer(s) | Producer(s) | Length |
|---|---|---|---|---|
| 1. | "Dell'amore non si sa" | Andrea Sandri, Leo Z, Mauro Malavasi | Leo Z, Malavasi |
| 2. | "L'attesa" | Mango | Celso Valli |
| 3. | "Un nuovo giorno" | Guy Chambers, Enrique Iglesias, Alessandra Scuri, Beatrice Quattrini | Chambers, Steve Power |
| 4. | "Tu ci sei" | Francesco Sartori, Lucio Quarantotto | Corrado Rustici |
| 5. | "Sin tu amor" (featuring Mario Reyes) | David Mario Reyes | Valli |
| 6. | "Libertà" | Sartori, Alessio Bonomo | Valli |
| 7. | "Per noi" | Amedeo Minghi, Paolo Audino | Valli |
| 8. | "Le parole che non ti ho detto" | Giuliano Sangiorgi | Rustici |
| 9. | "Sempre o mai" | Pier Paolo Guerrini, Andrea Bocelli | Valli |
| 10. | "In-canto" | Giuseppe Vessicchio, Bruno Lanza | Peppe Vessicchio |
| 11. | "Quante volte ti ho cercato" | Lucio Dalla | Valli |
| 12. | "When a Child Is Born" | Zacar, Fred Jay | Malavasi |
| 13. | "Go Where Love Goes" (featuring Holly Stell) (bonus track) | Jack Lenz, Ashley Lenz, Ciro Dammicco | J. Lenz |

UK version
| No. | Title | Writer(s) | Length |
|---|---|---|---|
| 12. | "Domani" (bonus track) | Franco Marino, Malavasi |

Notes

- In the United Kingdom, "Quante volte ti ho cercato" has been replaced by "Domani".

== Charts ==
=== Weekly charts ===
| Chart (2004) | Peak position |
|---|---|
| Australian Albums (ARIA) | 12 |
| Austrian Albums (Ö3 Austria) | 19 |
| Belgian Albums (Ultratop Flanders) | 27 |
| Belgian Albums (Ultratop Wallonia) | 43 |
| Danish Albums (Hitlisten) | 18 |
| Dutch Albums (Album Top 100) | 1 |
| Finnish Albums (Suomen virallinen lista) | 25 |
| French Albums (SNEP) | 55 |
| German Albums (Offizielle Top 100) | 41 |
| Hungarian Albums (MAHASZ) | 3 |
| Irish Albums (IRMA) | 45 |
| Italian Albums (FIMI) | 19 |
| New Zealand Albums (RMNZ) | 14 |
| Norwegian Albums (VG-lista) | 17 |
| Portuguese Albums (AFP) | 15 |
| Scottish Albums (OCC) | 24 |
| Swedish Albums (Sverigetopplistan) | 8 |
| Swiss Albums (Schweizer Hitparade) | 12 |
| UK Albums (OCC) | 19 |
| US Billboard 200 | 16 |
| US Top Classical Albums (Billboard) | 1 |

=== Year-end charts ===
| Chart (2004) | Position |
|---|---|
| Dutch Albums (Album Top 100) | 32 |
| Swedish Albums (Sverigetopplistan) | 38 |

| Chart (2005) | Position |
|---|---|
| Dutch Albums (Album Top 100) | 83 |
| US Billboard 200 | 105 |

== Certifications ==
| Region | Certification | Certified units/sales |
|---|---|---|
| Canada (Music Canada) | Platinum | 100,000^{^} |
| Denmark (IFPI Danmark) | Gold | 20,000^{^} |
| Hungary (MAHASZ) | Gold | 10,000^{^} |
| Netherlands (NVPI) | Gold | 40,000^{^} |
| New Zealand (RMNZ) | Gold | 7,500^{^} |
| Norway (IFPI Norway) | Gold | 20,000^{*} |
| Sweden (GLF) | Gold | 30,000^{^} |
| United Kingdom (BPI) | Gold | 100,000^{^} |
| United States (RIAA) | Platinum | 1,000,000^{^} |
^{*} Sales figures based on certification alone.^{^} Shipments figures based on certification alone.
