= My Gift to You (Hayley Westenra album) =

Studio album by Hayley Westenra
- Released: 15 November 2001
- Genres: Crossover; pop
- Length: 37:58
- Label: Universal New Zealand
- Producers: James Hall; David Selfe

Hayley Westenra chronology
Hayley Westenra (2001)	My Gift to You (2001)	Pure (2003)

My Gift to You is the second major-label album by New Zealand singer Hayley Westenra. The album was released only in New Zealand and Australia. It was published by the Universal New Zealand label in 2001.

Westenra chose favourite Christmas and seasonal songs for the album, featuring guests such as Annie Crummer and Westenra's sister Sophie.

The album continued Westenra's commercial success in New Zealand. For the first time in her career she had an album certified platinum in its first week of release. The album peaked at number four on the New Zealand Albums Chart.

== Track listing ==
No.	Title	Length
1.	"All I Have to Give"	2:29
2.	"You'll Never Walk Alone"	2:21
3.	"Chestnuts Roasting on an Open Fire (The Christmas Song)"	3:10
4.	"Mary, Did You Know?"	3:00
5.	"The Peace Song"	2:05
6.	"Do You Hear What I Hear?"	2:55
7.	"Somewhere Over the Rainbow"	4:22
8.	"Gabriel's Message"	3:09
9.	"Pokarekare Ana"	2:41
10.	"Through These Eyes"	4:42
11.	"Morning Has Broken"	3:18
12.	"Silent Night"	3:46

== Certifications ==
Certifications
Region	Certification	Certified units/sales
New Zealand (RMNZ)	3× Platinum	45,000^{^}
^{^} Shipments figures based on certification alone.
