= Hayley Sings Japanese Songs 2 =

Studio album by Hayley Westenra
- Released: 17 March 2009
- Genre: Japanese music
- Label: Universal Music Group

Hayley Westenra chronology
River of Dreams: The Very Best of Hayley Westenra (2008)	Hayley Sings Japanese Songs 2 (2009)	Winter Magic (2009)

Hayley Sings Japanese Songs 2 is, as the title suggests, the second Japanese-themed album by Christchurch, New Zealand soprano Hayley Westenra. Like its predecessor, the album contains Westenra's interpretations of traditional and popular contemporary Japanese songs. Some of the songs have been translated into English while others were sung in Japanese.

The album entered the Japanese charts at number 30 but rose to number 16 in its second week. The album was certified Gold in Taiwan.

The song "Nemu No Ki No Komoriuta" is based on a poem Empress Michiko wrote as a teenager.

Before the album's releasing, A special DVD features Westenra performing in a landscape of New Zealand with "Nemu No Ki No Komoriuta" and "Tsubomi" was released on 4 March 2009.

== Track listing ==
1. Tsubomi 蕾 (Bud)
2. Mikazuki 三日月 (Crescent Moon)
3. Mirai E 未来へ (The Future)
4. Mama E ママへ (To Mother)
5. Love Love Love
6. 秋桜 (Cosmos)
7. Warabigami ～Yamatoguchi～ 童神～ヤマトグチ～ (Child of God)
8. Mama Ni Sasageru Uta ママに捧げる詩(うた)(Mother of Mine)
9. Itsumo Nando Demo いつも何度でも (Many Times Always)
10. フラワー (Flower)
11. Nemu No Ki No Komoriuta ねむの木の子守歌 (Lullaby of Nemunoki)

== Charts and certifications ==
=== Charts ===
Chart (2009)	Peak Position
Japanese Album Charts	16
Taiwan Classical Album Charts	1

=== Certifications ===
Country	Provider	Certification	Sales
Taiwan	RIT	Gold	15,000

== Release history ==
Region	Date	Label	Format	Catalogue
Japan	17 March 2009	Universal Japan	CD/Download	
