= Montage (Yulia album) =

Studio album by Yulia
- Released: 2006
- Label: Sony BMG

Yulia chronology
| Into The West Special Christmas Edition (2004) | Montage (2006) |

Montage is the final studio album released in 2006 by New Zealand operatic singer Yulia (Yulia MacLean).

== Track listing ==
1. "We're All Alone"
2. "No-One Like You"
3. "Maybe"
4. "You Are Here"
5. "Everything You Touched"
6. "Habarnera"
7. "Che Faro"
8. "To Ni Veter"
9. "With You I'm Born Again"
10. "Pavane"
11. "Nobody Does It Better"
12. "Plaisir D'Amour"
13. "The Actress"
14. "The Show Must Go On"

== Charts ==
| Chart (2006) | Peak position |
|---|---|
| New Zealand Albums (RMNZ) | 1 |

== Certifications ==
| Region | Certification | Certified units/sales |
|---|---|---|
| New Zealand (RMNZ) | Platinum | 15,000^{^} |
^{^} Shipments figures based on certification alone.
