= Dell'amore non si sa =

Single by Andrea Bocelli

from the album Andrea
- Released: October 19, 2004
- Genre: Operatic pop, pop
- Length: 3:44
- Label: Decca, Sugar
- Songwriters: Mauro Malavasi, Andrea Sandri, Leo Z

Andrea Bocelli singles chronology
"L'abitudine" (2001)	"Dell'amore non si sa" (2004)	"Un nuovo giorno" (2004)

"Dell'amore non si sa" is the lead single from Italian pop tenor Andrea Bocelli's 2004 album, Andrea. The song was written by Mauro Malavasi, Andrea Sandri and Leo Z, and is among Bocelli's most popular and well-known songs.

Bocelli performed the song at the 2004 ceremony of the Nobel Peace Prize.

The song was featured as a duet with Hayley Westenra on her 2005 album, Odyssey. The duet with Westenra also appears as a bonus track for the Japanese version of Bocelli's The Best of Andrea Bocelli: Vivere.

== Coverversions ==
- In 2018, the South Korean crossover male vocal quartet Forestella published a cover on their album 'Evolution'
