= Winter Magic (album) =

Studio album by Hayley Westenra
- Released: 16 November 2009
- Genres: Classical, Christmas music, Traditional music
- Labels: Decca Records, Universal Music Group

Hayley Westenra chronology
Hayley Sings Japanese Songs 2 (2009)	Winter Magic (2009)	Paradiso (2011)

Winter Magic is a Christmas album by Christchurch, New Zealand soprano Hayley Westenra. The album was called Christmas Magic in some territories, and was released in Japan as Winter Magic: Fuyu No Kagayaki – Koibito Tachi No Pure Voice. The album features traditional Christmas songs (like Coventry Carol) and more contemporary Christmas songs (as Joni Mitchell's classic, River).

Winter Magic includes "The Little Road to Bethlehem", "Silent Night", "Veni Veni Emmanuel", "The Little Drummer Boy", and "The Coventry Carol", among other seasonal songs. These Christmas tunes combine Westenra's voice with the accompaniment of a choral group. Westenra herself wrote three new songs for the CD: "Peace Shall Come", "All With You", and "Christmas Morning". The variety of melodies, as well as the different genres, of the songs included were designed to showcase the versatility of Hayley's voice to perform classically, as in "Corpus Christi Carol", as well as in a considerably more "pop" style for songs like "Peace Shall Come". Westenra's ability to achieve such variety in a single album has garnered her critical praise.

== Track listing ==
1. Little Road to Bethlehem
2. Carol of the Bells
3. Christmas Song (Chestnuts Roasting on an Open Fire)
4. Veni Veni Emmanuel
5. Silent Night
6. Christmas Morning
7. Sleigh Ride
8. River
9. Little Drummer Boy
10. Corpus Christi Carol
11. All with You
12. Coventry Carol
13. Winter's Dream
14. Peace Shall Come
15. On the Wings of Time (Japanese Bonus Track)
15. It's Only Christmas (with Ronan Keating (from Boyzone) - UK and NZ Bonus Track)

== Release history ==
Region	Date	Label	Format	Catalogue
Japan	30 September 2009	Universal Music Japan	CD/Download	
New Zealand	23 November 2009	Universal New Zealand	CD/Download	
United States	24 November 2009	Decca	CD/Download	
United Kingdom	30 November 2009	Decca	CD/Download	

== Charts ==
=== Album ===
Chart (2009)	Peak Position
New Zealand Music Charts	20
Taiwan Classical Album Charts	1
U.S. Billboard Classical Albums Charts	11
UK Classical Album Charts	9
UK Album Charts	95

== Tours ==
=== Asia ===
1. 3 October 2009– National Theater and Concert Hall, Republic of China, Taipei
2. 11 October 2009– Music in the Air Festival, Tokyo International Forum
3. 12 October 2009– Kobe International House, Kobe
4. 15 October 2009– Shirakawa Hall, Sakae, Nagoya
5. 17 October 2009– Tokorozawa Civic Cultural Centre Muse, Tokorozawa, Saitama
6. 18 October 2009– Yokohama Minato Mirai Hall, Yokohama

=== United Kingdom ===
1. 23 November 2009– Peterborough Cathedral
2. 24 November 2009– Ripon Cathedral
3. 26 November 2009– Manchester Cathedral
4. 28 November 2009– Banbury St. Mary's
5. 2 December 2009– Tewkesbury Abbey
6. 3 December 2009– Exeter Cathedral
7. 14 December 2009– Norwich Cathedral
8. 19 December 2009– Bristol Cathedral
9. 21 December 2009– Barbican Centre
