= Hine E Hine =

Māori lullaby

"Hine E Hine" is a lullaby in Māori written by Fanny Howie (also known by her stage name Princess Te Rangi Pai) in around 1907.

== History ==
An instrumental version of "Hine E Hine" was used from 1975 to 1994 as TV2's closedown song, which accompanied a cartoon featuring the Goodnight Kiwi.

It was the opening song on Kiri Te Kanawa's 1999 album Maori Songs. Hayley Westenra sang the song on her 2003 album Pure. The song features on the José Carreras album The José Carreras Collection. The Phoenix Foundation performed the song in the 2010 film Boy.

== Lyrics ==
E tangi ana koe
Hine e hine
Kua ngenge ana koe
Hine e hine.

Kāti tō pōuri rā
Noho i te aroha
Te ngākau o te Matua
Hine e hine.

You are weeping,
Little girl, darling girl,
you are weary,
Little girl, darling girl.

Be sad no longer,
There is love for you
in the heart of the Father,
Little girl, darling girl.

== Melody ==
After: Princess Te Rangi Pai (c. 1914). A Maori Slumber Song – Hine E Hine. London: Beal, Stuttard & Co. OCLC 153985184 – via Alexander Turnbull Library, New Zealand National Library.
