= Yulia (singer) =

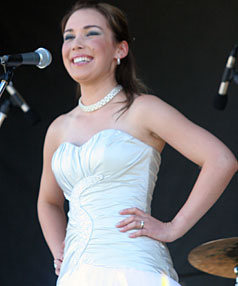

Background information
- Also known as: Yulia Townsend, Yulia MacLean, Yulia
- Born: Yulia Beredenko; January 13, 1986; Volgograd, Russia
- Genre: Classical Crossover
- Instrument: Vocals
- Years active: 2004–present
- Label: Oikos Music
- Website: www.yulia.co.nz

Yulia (also Yulia Townsend and Yulia MacLean) is a Russian-born New Zealand classical crossover singer. Her first solo album Into The West went platinum in its first week of sales in New Zealand. She won two NZ Music Awards; 'Best Female Solo Artist' and 42 Below 'Best Selling Album in New Zealand'. She has supported Amici Forever and Russell Watson with two sold-out tours in Tokyo. Yulia's albums Into the West and Montage had three top 40 radio hits in New Zealand, "Into the West", "Angel" and "We're All Alone". Yulia was the first female vocalist in New Zealand to have two back to back number one hit albums. Yulia's voice was once described as a "lovely rich contralto with passion and conviction", and she also has the ability to perform in the mezzo-soprano range.

== Life ==
MacLean was born and raised in Volgograd, Russia. She and her mother emigrated from Russia to Christchurch, New Zealand in 2002 after being abandoned by her abusive father.

== Career ==
Within two years of living in New Zealand, Yulia learned to speak English, finished her education and signed a recording deal with Sony Music New Zealand. Yulia was first discovered on regional television as a last minute subject for a ten-minute segment on Good Living With Kerry Pierson on Christchurch's local television station CTV. Her debut album, Into the West was released in 2004 and was a commercial success, reaching number one in New Zealand's album chart and went four times Platinum. Two years later, Yulia released her second album, Montage which also topped the charts.

Soon after the release of Montage, Sony and Yulia parted ways. After becoming disillusioned with the music industry, Yulia decided to change her career and become a flight attendant. In 2007, she met Glyn MacLean, the director and owner of Oikos Music Group. MacLean encouraged her to continue with her career in music and signed Yulia to a management and publishing deal. The pair married in February 2008 and invited 168 fans to the wedding at their own cost. In March 2011, the couple announced that Yulia was pregnant with the couple's first child. She gave birth to a son late 2011. She had another son in early 2014. The couple separated in 2015, after their second child was born. Glyn moved to Australia and ceased being her manager, and Yulia reverted to her maiden name.

In 2010, Yulia won the Grand Prix in the European Song Competition in Riga, Latvia, and the national award for Best Nationwide Entertainment in the Corporate Events Guide 2010 People's Choice Awards. While in London in November 2010, Yulia "delivered" for producer Craig Leon. Leon, who has worked with a variety of artists including Blondie, The Bangles, The Ramones, and Pavarotti, heard Yulia's music online and requested a meeting. Yulia signed a music production deal with Craig Leon in November 2010 and was reported to be working on pre-production for a third studio album, but this did not materialise.

In 2010, Yulia recorded and self-produced four live shows which were presented as limited edition collectable CDs. Live at Mills Reef, Live at Mill Bay Haven, Enchanted Song and Live at Ascension Wine Estate.

In 2013, Yulia's international music career was to be launched by Grammy Award Winning music producer Craig Leon and International Media Executive Gustavo Sagastume. She was part of a world music TV special to appear on PBS TV USA called Divinas along with Irish singer Méav Ní Mhaolchatha and Persian-born Israeli singer Rita. Following the U.S. public television premiere of this special, a Divinas tour was set to take place in the United States in the Spring of 2013.

== Discography ==
=== Albums ===
- Into the West (2004) #1 NZ (4× Platinum – 60,000+)
- Into the West Special Christmas Edition (2004)
- Montage (2006) #1 NZ (2× Platinum – 30,000+)

2010 Live Concert Series; limited edition collectables:

- Live at Mills Reef
- Live at Mill Bay Haven
- Enchanted Song
- Live at Ascension Wine Estate
