= Into the West (album) =

Studio album by Yulia
- Released: 2004
- Label: Sony BMG

Yulia chronology
Into the West (2004)	Montage (2006)

Into the West is the debut album released in 2004 by New Zealand singer, Yulia (Yulia MacLean). That same year, the album was rereleased in December as a two disc special edition, entitled Into The West Special Christmas Edition.

== Track listing ==
=== Original release ===
1. "Into The West"
2. "Scarborough Fair"
3. "Angel"
4. "The Prayer"
5. "L'hymne à l'amour"
6. "Hoki Hoki Tonu Mai/E Pari Ra"
7. "Softly Whispering I Love You"
8. "I Go To Sleep"
9. "If You Go Away"
10. "One Day I'll Fly Away"
11. "Ombra mai fu"
12. "Russia"
13. "Bailero"
14. "Otchi Tchornia"

=== Special Christmas Edition ===
The Special Christmas Edition contained a bonus disc with the tracks:

1. "I'll Be Home For Christmas"
2. "Teehaya Noch (Silent Night)"
3. "Mary's Boy Child"

== Charts ==
Chart (2004–05)	Peak position
New Zealand Albums (RMNZ)	1

== Certifications ==
Region	Certification	Certified units/sales
New Zealand (RMNZ)	4× Platinum	60,000^{^}
^{^} Shipments figures based on certification alone.
