= Hayley Westenra (album) =

Studio album by Hayley Westenra
- Released: 26 April 2001
- Genres: Crossover; pop
- Length: 47:06
- Label: Universal New Zealand
- Producers: David Selfe; Gray Bartlett

Hayley Westenra chronology
Walking in the Air (2000)	Hayley Westenra (2001)	My Gift to You (2001)

Hayley Westenra is the major-label debut studio album by Hayley Westenra, released through Universal New Zealand on 26 April 2001. This album was released only in New Zealand and Australia. The last two tracks were released on special editions of the disc – the other editions do not include these tracks. It was published by the Universal New Zealand label in 2001.

The album was a commercial success in New Zealand, being certified Gold in its first week and topping the New Zealand Albums Chart for four weeks.

== Track listing ==
No.	Title	Length
1.	"Walking in the Air"	3:15
2.	"Ave Maria (Bach)"	2:27
3.	"Memory"	4:02
4.	"All I Ask of You"	3:18
5.	"Somewhere"	3:18
6.	"The Mists of Islay"	2:28
7.	"Ave Maria (Schubert)"	3:21
8.	"Bright Eyes"	4:05
9.	"Pie Jesu"	2:41
10.	"Wishing You Were Somehow Here Again"	3:08
11.	"I Dreamed a Dream"	3:44
12.	"Love Changes Everything"	3:30

=== Bonus tracks ===
No.	Title	Length
13.	"God Defend New Zealand"	3:31
14.	"Amazing Grace" (live)	4:18

== Certifications ==
Certifications
Region	Certification	Certified units/sales
New Zealand (RMNZ)	5× Platinum	75,000^{^}
^{^} Shipments figures based on certification alone.
