= Fanny Howie =

Te Whanau-a-Apanui and Ngati Porou; singer, composer

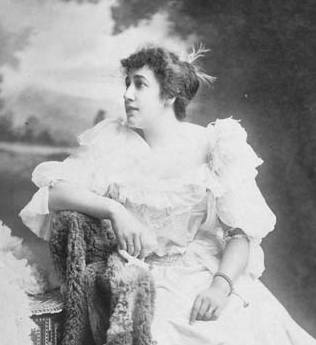
- Howie, c. 1898
- Born: Fanny Rose Porter; 11 January 1868; Tokomaru Bay, New Zealand
- Died: 20 May 1916 (aged 48); Ōpōtiki, New Zealand
- Other names: Fanny Rose Poata; Te Rangi Pai; Princess Te Rangi Pai
- Occupation(s): Singer and composer
- Years active: 1898–1909
- Known for: "Hine E Hine"
- Spouse: John Howie (m. 1891)
- Children: 1
- Relatives: Thomas William Porter (father)

Fanny Rose Howie (née Porter or Poata; 11 January 1868 – 20 May 1916), also known by her stage name Te Rangi Pai, was a New Zealand singer and composer. Of Māori descent, she identified with the iwi of Ngāti Porou and Te Whānau-ā-Apanui. The lullaby "Hine E Hine" is her most famous composition, and she was well known in Britain as a singer of opera and popular music from 1901 to 1905.

== Early life ==
She was born in Tokomaru Bay, New Zealand, on 11 January 1868, the daughter of Thomas William Porter and Herewaka Porourangi Potae (also known as Te Rangi-i-pāea). She was the eldest of their nine children. Her mother was the daughter of Tama-i-whakanehua-i-te-rangi (a high-ranking Ngāti Porou chief and signatory to the Treaty of Waitangi) and Mereana Tongia, and held high rank in Te Whānau-ā-Apanui, Te Whānau-ā-Ruataupare and Ngāti Porou. From her mother, Howie would inherit the title of ariki tapairu, meaning first-born female of a family of rank.

Howie's father was a soldier and after his prominent role in the expeditions against Te Kooti was given command of the East Coast Militia and Volunteer District in 1877. The family settled on the East Coast, where he became mayor of Gisborne between 1878 and 1886, and Howie's mother was a well-known member of the Anglican church. Howie and her three sisters attended Mrs Sheppard's Ladies' School in Napier and were given a musical education at home, where their parents occasionally hosted touring musicians such as Pollard's Lilliputian Opera Company. Howie impressed these visitors with her talent and in 1891, at the age of around 23, was encouraged by visiting singer Madame Patey to obtain formal training overseas. On 15 October 1891 she married civil servant John Howie in Christchurch, and they settled in Nelson where Howie became an amateur opera singer.

== Overseas career ==
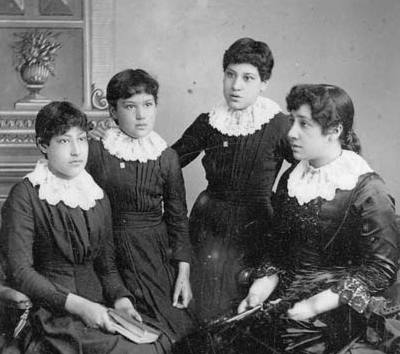
Howie (right) and her three sisters in around 1885

In 1898, Howie went to Australia to study singing, accompanied by her husband, and toured there the following year with speakers Charles Clark and RS Smythe, before returning to New Zealand. By 1900 she had starting using the stage name of Te Rangi Pai (meaning "the beautiful sky", and a shortened form of her mother's name) or sometimes Princess Te Rangi Pai. In December 1900 she travelled to England where she embarked on concert, oratorio and ballad training with (amongst others) the baritone Charles Santley. Her vocal range was from mezzo soprano to contralto and allowed her to cover many styles.

In 1901 she gave her debut performance in Liverpool under the stage name "The Princess Te Rangi Pai", and received praise from critics, after which she performed widely at promenade and formal concerts, charity performances and all England's major concert halls, often aside leading singers of the day. She sang at the Royal Albert Hall on several occasions including at the Grand Irish Festival and Grand Scotch Festival, both in 1902. She also organised a colonial concert that same year at the Queen's Hall, featuring New Zealand and Australian vocalists as well as the performance of a haka by a Māori group who had come to London for the planned coronation of Edward VII. A reviewer said that Howie "has a voice of admirable power and quality, and knows exceedingly well how to use it". Her husband had by this stage returned to New Zealand and after his departure she had little money and had to take any available engagement. On occasion this meant going without food in order to pay for the necessary outfits for her concerts.

In 1903 she toured the United Kingdom with the baritone Edward Rangiuia, who like her came from Gisborne, and a New Zealand representative brass band, the Hinemoa Band. She sat on the Children's Protection League committee and, at an entertainment arranged by the League, was invited to sing by Queen Alexandra, which she said was "quite a special thing" and "of course, very gratifying". She sang before the King and Queen on several other occasions, and was able to perform a number of Māori songs for British audiences including many of her own compositions, of which the most successful was "Hine E Hine".

== Return to New Zealand ==
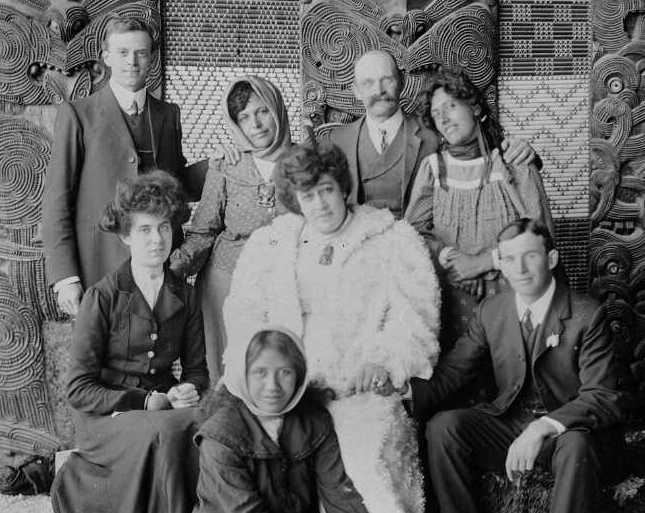
Concert party including Howie (centre) and Maggie Papakura (standing, far right), in Rotorua, 6 October 1906

Howie's mother and youngest brother died in late 1904, and in consequence Howie returned to New Zealand in 1905. She intended to stay temporarily and to return to London via an American tour in 1908. In 1906 and 1907 she undertook several popular tours throughout New Zealand, performing to packed concert halls, including a tour with a concert party which included Maggie Papakura. However, she was prevented from returning to London by ill health; she suffered from diabetes and her health problems were exacerbated by disputes with her father, who had sold her mother's extensive Māori land interests. In 1908 she and her siblings failed to obtain a court judgment for the recovery of rent on one of her mother's former properties.

In 1908, she retired from performing and moved to Gisborne to live with her husband, who had recently been appointed collector of customs for the Poverty Bay area. In 1910, after her health deteriorated further, she went to live in a house built for her by her husband and adopted son on her ancestral land at Maungaroa, near Te Kaha. Later in life she continued to teach singing and to compose her own original songs. She also learned to speak te reo Māori, her father having not allowed her to learn it as a child. She died at Ōpōtiki on 20 May 1916, and was buried under a pōhutukawa tree at Maungaroa.

An instrumental arrangement of her lullaby "Hine E Hine" was aired on New Zealand television every night from 1981 to 1994 as part of the Goodnight Kiwi animated short. The animation signalled that the day's broadcasting had ended, and is considered part of "kiwiana" or New Zealand culture.
