= Minako Honda =

Japanese singer (1967-2005)

Minako Honda 工藤美奈子
- Minako Honda on the cover of her album Cancel (1986).

Background information
- Also known as: Minako Honda
- Born: Minako Kudo; July 31, 1967; Itabashi, Tokyo, Japan
- Origin: Asaka, Saitama, Japan
- Died: November 6, 2005 (aged 38) Bunkyo, Tokyo Japan
- Genres: Pop, kayokyoku, operatic pop, classical crossover
- Occupations: Singer, actress
- Instrument: Vocals
- Years active: 1985–2005
- Labels: Toshiba-EMI, Columbia Music Entertainment
- Website: www.minako-channel.com
- Education: Horikoshi High School

Minako Kudo (Japanese: 工藤美奈子, Hepburn: Kudō Minako; July 31, 1967 – November 6, 2005), better known as Minako Honda (Japanese: 本田美奈子, Hepburn: Honda Minako), was a Japanese idol and musical singer. In 1985, she made her debut with the single "Satsui no Vacance".

She was diagnosed with acute myelogenous leukemia on January 5, 2005. At 4:38 A.M. on November 6, 2005, Honda died at the Juntendo University Hospital in Bunkyō, Tokyo.

== Early life ==
Kudo was born in Japan on July 31, 1967, at Narimasu Maternity Hospital in Narimasu, Itabashi. Kudo's family initially lived in Shibamata, Katsushika. They moved to Asaka, Saitama, where Kudo enrolled at Shirayuri Kindergarten.

== Beginnings ==
As a child Kudo was very involved with singing, largely influenced by her mother who dreamed of becoming a singer. In Kudo's graduation collection from Asaka's 6th Elementary School in Aska City, she wrote that, "It would be nice if I could become an actress or singer." While at Asaka Daiichi Junior High School at the age of 14, she would audition for Star Tanjō!, where in the TV qualifying round she would sing "Hello Goodbye" by Yoshie Kashiwabara which would win her that round and advance her to the battle tournament round, for that she would sing "Blue Angel" by her cousin, Seiko Matsuda, however none of the production companies expressed interest and Kudo would not win the competition.

While Kudo was enrolled at Tokyo Seitoku University Junior & Senior High School in 1983, she would visit Harajuku because the record label Bondo Kikaku was recruiting a new member for the group called Shojotai. Bondo Kikaku had also participated in the show Star Tanjō!. While still working with Bondo Kikaku in 1984, she heard a demo of Meiko Nakahara's song "Kimitachi Kiwi Papaya Mango da ne", which had just become a hit, this lead Kudo to believe Bondo Kikaku's President, Keiji Takasugi was taking the company in the wrong direction, and would make her decide to become a solo artist.

In 1984, Kudo performed at the Nagasaki Kayo Festival, which was a television contest to where teenagers and young adults competed to become new idols by winning what was called the grand prix. On the show, Honda was highly evaluated by judges who noted her powerful voice and overwhelming singing ability which led her to win the Grand Prix part of the competition.

Following her success in the Nagasaki Kayo Festival, Kudo would make her debut under the name Minako Honda with the song "Satsui no Vacance", this lead her to receive a Japan Record Award for the best new artist of that year.

Looking to follow up on the success of "Satsui no Vacane", Honda would release "1986 nen no Marilyn", in which a controversy would arise from her performances, in which Honda would shake her hips suggestively while wearing a navel costume, at the time this was not common for idols and was thought to be offensive.

In 1988, she made an attempt to revive her dwindling career by forming an all girl rock group called "Minako with Wild Cats", the group however would disband a year later due to lack of any hit songs.

In 1990 a turning point came for her career. Honda had auditioned for a part in the Tokyo production of Broadway play Miss Saigon, she won out over 15,000 other candidates for the part of Kim. While still starring in the role as Kim in Miss Saigon in the 1990s, Honda visited Vietnam. There she visited the famous Củ Chi tunnels just outside Ho Chi Minh City. She was found by Vietnamese authorities having photographs taken of her in the Củ Chi tunnels draped only in a Vietnamese flag. She was fined and expelled from Vietnam shortly after.

She would go on to perform in leading roles in Fiddler on the Roof, The King and I, and Les Miserables.

== Later career and illness ==
Towards the end of her life, she released several classical albums demonstrating her soprano singing voice, including religious works such as "Amazing Grace" and Ave Maria. She also sang theme songs for several anime programs.

She did not abandon pop music in her adult career; indeed, she became recognized for her vocal improvement in the adult pop genre. Her song "Tsubasa" is famous for the "long note" that she holds for 30 seconds.

In 2004, Honda would add a period to the end of her name; this was done because Honda believed there was judgment to her surname.

Honda became ill in late 2004, but still performed in December in spite of a fever and fatigue. When her cold-like symptoms failed to improve, she sought medical treatment and was diagnosed with acute myelogenous leukemia on January 5, 2005.

Honda was able to celebrate her 38th birthday at home feeling relatively well, but had a relapse shortly afterwards. Chromosome aberration was discovered and she received a dose of anticancer medicine from the United States to treat it. She recovered again briefly, but then suffered another relapse.

== Death ==
Honda developed lung complications on October 21, 2005, and she lapsed into a coma on November 3. At 4:38 a.m. on November 6, 2005, Honda died at the Juntendo University Hospital in Bunkyō, Tokyo, officially from acute myelogenous leukemia. She was 38 at the time of her death.

== Discography ==
During her life, Honda released 14 original albums, 5 compilation albums, 25 physical singles, 1 digital single and 6 home-video releases.

- Note: All releases after 2005 are posthumous.

=== Singles ===
==== As soloist ====
List of singles, with selected chart positions
Year	Single	Peak chart positions	Formats
Year	Single	JPN Oricon	Formats
1985	"Satsui No Vacance" （殺意のバカンス）	21	CD, LP, Cassette, digital download
1985	"Suki To Iinasai" （好きと言いなさい）	21	CD, LP, Cassette, digital download
1985	"Aoi Shumatsu" （青い週末）	23	CD, LP, Cassette, digital download
1985	"Temptation"	10	CD, LP, Cassette, digital download
1986	"1986 Nen No Marilyn" （1986年のマリリン）	3	CD, LP, Cassette, digital download
1986	"Sosotte"	3	CD, LP, Cassette, digital download
1986	"Help"	2	CD, LP, Cassette, digital download
1986	"The Cross: Ai No Jyujika" (愛の十字架)	5	CD, LP, Cassette, digital download
1987	"Oneway Generation"	2	CD, LP, Cassette, digital download
1987	"Crazy Nights/Golden Days"	10	CD, LP, Cassette, digital download
1987	"Heart break"	3	CD, LP, Cassette, digital download
1987	"Kodoku Na Hurricane" (孤独なハリケーン)	2	CD, LP, Cassette, digital download
1987	"Kanashimi Swing" (悲しみSWING)	3	CD, LP, Cassette, digital download
1989	"7th Bird: Ai Ni Koi (愛に恋)	53	CD, LP, digital download
1990	"Shangri-La"	62	CD, digital download
1994	"Tsubasa" (つばさ)	62	CD, digital download
1995	"Lullaby: Yasashiku Dakasete" (ら・ら・ば・い～優しく抱かせて)	19	CD, digital download
1995	"Boku No Heya De Kurasou" (僕の部屋で暮らそう)	99	CD, digital download
1995	"Fall in Love With You: Koi ni Ochite" (恋に落ちて)	–	CD, digital download
1996	"Shining Eyes"	–	CD, digital download
1999	"Kaze no Uta" (風のうた)	300	CD, digital download
2000	"Honey"	289	CD, digital download
2001	"Hoshizora" (星空)	–	CD, digital download
2003	"Nadja!!" (ナージャ!!)	150	CD, digital download
2004	"Shinsekai" (新世界)	85	CD, digital download
"—" denotes items which did not chart.

==== As Minako With Wild Cats ====
List of singles, with selected chart positions
Year	Single	Peak chart positions	Formats
Year	Single	JPN Physical	Formats
1988	"Anata To Nettai" （あなたと、熱帯）	10	CD, LP, Cassette, digital download
1988	"Stand Up: Full Metal Armor"	59	CD, LP, Cassette, digital download
1989	"Katte Ni Sasete" （勝手にさせて）	49	CD, LP, digital download
"—" denotes items which did not chart.

=== Albums ===
==== As soloist ====
List of albums, with selected chart positions
Title	Album details	Peak positions
Title	Album details	JPN Oricon
M'Syndrome	Released: November 21, 1985; Label: EMI Music Japan; Formats: CD, LP, Cassette tape, digital download, streaming	2
Lips	Released: June 4, 1986; Label: EMI Music Japan; Formats: CD, LP, Cassette tape, digital download, streaming	3
Cancel	Released: September 28, 1986; Label: EMI Music Japan; Formats: CD, LP, Cassette tape, digital download, streaming	2
Oversea	Released: June 22, 1987; Label: EMI Music Japan; Formats: CD, LP, Cassette tape, digital download, streaming	4
Midnight Swing	Released: June 22, 1988; Label: EMI Music Japan; Formats: CD, LP, Cassette tape, digital download, streaming	23
Junction	Released: September 24, 1994; Label: Mercury Records; Formats: CD, digital download, streaming	75
Hare Tokidoki Kumori (晴れ ときどき くもり)	Released: June 25, 1995; Label: Mercury Records; Formats: CD, digital download, streaming	99
Ave Maria	Released: May 21, 2003; Label: Nippon Columbia; Formats: CD, digital download, streaming	22
Toki (時)	Released: November 35, 2004; Label: Nippon Columbia; Formats: CD, digital download, streaming	39
Amazing Grace	Released: October 19, 2005; Label: Nippon Columbia; Formats: CD, CD+DVD, digital download, streaming	7
Kokoro wo Komete (心を込めて)	Released: April 20, 2006; Label: Nippon Columbia; Formats: CD, digital download, streaming	23
Yasashii Sekai (優しい世界)	Released: November 6, 2006; Label: Nippon Columbia; Formats: CD, CD+DVD, digital download, streaming	46
Eternal Harmony	Released: November 6, 2008; Label: Nippon Columbia; Formats: CD, CD+DVD, digital download, streaming	163
Last Concert (ラスト・コンサート)	Released: December 10, 2008; Label: Nippon Columbia; Formats: CD, digital download, streaming	128
Again	Released: November 4, 2015; Label: Nippon Columbia; Formats: CD, digital download, streaming	89
"—" denotes items which did not chart.

==== As Minako With Wild Cats ====
List of albums, with selected chart positions
Title	Album details	Peak positions
Title	Album details	JPN Oricon
Wild Cats	Released: August 5, 1988; Label: EMI Music Japan; Formats: CD, LP, digital download, streaming	32
Hyōteki (豹的 -Target-)	Released: July 5, 1989; Label: EMI Music Japan; Formats: CD, LP, digital download, streaming	86

=== Compilation albums ===
List of albums, with selected chart positions
Title	Album details	Peak positions
Title	Album details	JPN Oricon
The Minako Collection	Released: December 20, 1986; Label: EMI Music Japan; Formats: CD, LP, Cassette tape, digital download, streaming	13
Look over my shoulder	Released: October 26, 1988; Label: EMI Music Japan; Formats: CD, SHM-CD, digital download, streaming	63
Life Minako Honda: Premium Best	Released: May 21, 2005; Label: Nippon Columbia; Formats: CD, CD+DVD, digital download, streaming	23
CD+DVD THE Best	Released: December 7, 2005; Label: Nippon Columbia; Formats: CD+DVD	19
I Love You	Released: March 29, 2006; Label: Nippon Columbia; Formats: CD, digital download, streaming	113
Angel Voice: Minako Honda Memorial Best	Released: April 18, 2007; Label: Nippon Columbia; Formats: CD+DVD, digital download, streaming	66
Classical Best: Ten ni Hibiku Uta	Released: April 20, 2007; Label: Nippon Columbia; Formats: CD+DVD, LP, digital download, streaming	32
Anthem of Life: Sweet Ballads Best	Released: April 20, 2007; Label: Nippon Columbia; Formats: CD+DVD, digital download, streaming	233
"—" denotes items which did not chart.

=== Home-video release ===
List of albums, with selected chart positions
Title	Album details	Peak positions
Title	Album details	JPN Oricon
The Virgin Concert in Budokan	Released: February 20, 1986; Label: EMI Music Japan; Formats: VHS, LD, DVD	208
Dangerous Bond Street	Released: November 21, 1986; Label: EMI Music Japan; Formats: VHS, LD	–
Dramatic Flash	Released: June 21, 1987; Label: EMI Music Japan; Formats: VHS, LD, DVD	–
DISPA 1987	Released: December 16, 1987; Label: EMI Music Japan; Formats: VHS, LD, DVD	–
Minako in L.A.	Released: January 10, 1989; Label: EMI Music Japan; Formats: VHS, LD	–
Katteni Sasete	Released: June 28, 1989; Label: EMI Music Japan; Formats: VHS, LD	–
Tropical Holiday in Hawai	Released: January 1991; Label: EMI Music Japan; Formats: VHS, LD	–
Tropical Holiday	Released: December 10, 1991; Label: EMI Music Japan; Formats: VHS, LD	–
"—" denotes items which did not chart.

=== Movie soundtracks ===
- Passenger (October 25, 1988)
- Hunter x Hunter (1999, Ending no. 1 – Kaze no Uta)

=== Theatre ===
- Miss Saigon (1992–1993) – Kim
- Fiddler on the Roof (1994–1998) – Hodel
- The King and I (1996–2002) – Tuptim
- Les Misérables (1997–2001) – Éponine
- Himeyuri (2002–2004) – Kimi
- Twelfth Night (2003) – A Cat
- Claudia (2004) – Claudia

Note: Minako Honda was originally cast as Fantine in Les Misérables for the Japanese tour in 2005, but due to her death, another actor was given the part.

Preceded by Yukiko Okada	FNS Music Festival for Best New Artist; 1985	Succeeded by Shonentai
Preceded by Kōji Kikkawa, Yukiko Okada	Shinjuku Music Festival for Gold Prize; 1985 (with : Shigeyuki Nakamura)	Succeeded by Shonentai, Mariko
