= Treasure (Hayley Westenra album) =

Studio album by Hayley Westenra
- Released: 26 February 2007 (UK)
- Genre: Crossover, pop
- Label: Decca Music Group

Hayley Westenra chronology
Odyssey (2005)	Treasure (2007)	Hayley sings Japanese Songs (2008)

Treasure (titled Celtic Treasure in some countries) is the third internationally released album by Christchurch, New Zealand soprano Hayley Westenra, released in 2007. The album celebrates Westenra's Irish roots by covering Irish songs like "Danny Boy" and religious classics like "Whispering Hope", "The Heart Worships", while also including three new songs which Hayley has co-written.

Treasure became Westenra's fourth album to hit #1 on the New Zealand music charts, and her third album to debut at #1 on the New Zealand music charts, making her the most successful female album artist in the history of the Official New Zealand Music Charts. The album spent five weeks in the number 1 position on the New Zealand charts.

Treasure became Westenra's second album to chart in the US and peaked within the Top 10 in the UK (it was the second highest new entry its debut week).

A special edition of the album released in Westenra's native New Zealand includes that country's national anthem God Defend New Zealand.

== Track listing ==
=== US, Australia, New Zealand and Canadian version ===
1. Let Me Lie
2. Scarborough Fair
3. Shenandoah
4. Summer Fly
5. Whispering Hope
6. Danny Boy
7. Summer Rain
8. The Last Rose of Summer
9. One Fine Day
10. Sonny
11. The Water Is Wide
12. Melancholy Interlude
13. Abide with Me

=== UK and International version ===
No.	Title	Length
1.	"Let Me Lie"
2.	"Le Notte De Silenzio" (featuring Humphrey Berney, tenor)
3.	"Santa Lucia"
4.	"Whispering Hope"
5.	"Summer Rain"
6.	"Danny Boy"
7.	"One Fine Day"
8.	"Shenandoah"
9.	"The Heart Worships"
10.	"E Pari Ra"
11.	"Sonny"
12.	"Summer Fly"
13.	"Melancholy Interlude"
14.	"Bist Du Bei Mir"
15.	"Abide with Me"

==== United Kingdom iTunes version ====
1. Let Me Lie
2. Le Notte De Silenzio
3. Shenandoah
4. Whispering Hope
5. Summer Rain
6. Danny Boy
7. One Fine Day
8. Santa Lucia
9. The Heart Worships
10. E Pari Ra
11. Sonny
12. Summer Fly
13. Melancholy Interlude
14. Bist Du Bei Mir
15. Abide With Me
16. Jekyll theme song (digital bonus version only)
17. The Last Rose of Summer (iTunes bonus version only)

=== New Zealand special edition ===
1. Let Me Lie
2. Scarborough Fair
3. Shenandoah
4. Summer Fly
5. Whispering Hope
6. Danny Boy
7. Summer Rain
8. The Last Rose of Summer
9. One Fine Day
10. Sonny
11. The Water is Wide
12. Melancholy Interlude
13. Abide With Me
14. Le Notte De Silenzio
15. E Pari Ra
16. Bist Du Bei Mir
17. The Heart Worships
18. Santa Lucia
19. God Defend New Zealand

== Charts ==
Chart performance for Treasure / Celtic Treasure
Chart (2007)	Peak position
Australian Albums (ARIA)	47
New Zealand Albums (RMNZ)	1
UK Albums (OCC)	9
US Billboard 200	184
US Top Classical Albums (Billboard)	3

== Certifications ==
Certifications for Treasure
Region	Certification	Certified units/sales
New Zealand (RMNZ)	2× Platinum	30,000^{^}
United Kingdom (BPI)	Silver	60,000^{^}
^{^} Shipments figures based on certification alone.
