= Odyssey (Hayley Westenra album) =

Studio album by Hayley Westenra
- Released: 8 August 2005
- Recorded: September 2003, July 2004, February–June 2005
- Genre: Pop
- Length: 50:22
- Label: Decca Music Group
- Producer: Giles Martin

Hayley Westenra chronology
Pure (2003)	Odyssey (2005)	Treasure (2007)

Professional ratings
Review scores
Source	Rating
AllMusic	3.5/5 stars

Odyssey is the second internationally published album by Hayley Westenra. Her other previous albums, with the exception of Pure, were released only in New Zealand and Australia. It was published by the Decca Music Group label in 2005.

Odyssey included a duet with Andrea Bocelli called "Dell'Amore Non Si Sa", a cover of Andrew Fortier's "I Say Grace", an inspired cover of Joni Mitchell's "Both Sides, Now", "May it Be" – an Enya song from The Lord of the Rings, as well as a cover of the song "What You Never Know (Won't Hurt You)" from the Sarah Brightman album Harem. "Never Saw Blue" is a cover of "Never Saw Blue Like That" by Shawn Colvin from the Dawson's Creek soundtrack.

Odyssey debuted at number one on the New Zealand Album Chart, being certified platinum in its first week of release.

== Track listing ==
=== International version ===
This excludes the US, UK and Japanese versions.

1. "Prayer"
2. "Never Saw Blue"
3. "Dell'amore non si sa" (with Andrea Bocelli)
4. "Ave Maria (Caccini)"
5. "Both Sides, Now"
6. "What You Never Know (Won't Hurt You)"
7. "May It Be"
8. "Quanta Qualia"
9. "Bachianas Brasileiras No 5 Aria (Cantilena)"
10. "She Moves Through the Fair"
11. "I Say Grace"
12. "My Heart Belongs to You"

=== New Zealand special edition bonus disc ===
1. Bridal Ballad
2. O mio babbino caro
3. Laudate Dominum
4. Wiegenlied
5. Ave Maria (Bach) (English Lyrics)
6. The Mists of Islay

=== Japanese version ===
1. Prayer
2. Never Saw Blue
3. "Dell'amore non si sa" (with Andrea Bocelli)
4. Ave Maria
5. Both Sides Now
6. What You Never Know (Won't Hurt You)
7. May It Be
8. Quanta Qualia
9. Bachianas Brasileiras No. 5 Aria (Cantilena)
10. She Moves Through the Fair
11. I Say Grace
12. My Heart Belongs to You
13. Bridal Ballad From The Merchant of Venice
14. The Mummers Dance
15. Wiegenlied (From Lorelei)

=== United Kingdom version ===
There were two different versions of the UK album released. The first was released on 26 September 2005 and the second was released on 10 April 2006.

First version

No.	Title	Length
1.	"Prayer"	4:21
2.	"Dell'amore non si sa"	3:41
3.	"Never Saw Blue"	4:37
4.	"Ave Maria"	3:41
5.	"What You Never Know (Won't Hurt You)"	3:41
6.	"Quanta Qualia"	4:24
7.	"Both Sides, Now"	3:43
8.	"May It Be"	3:38
9.	"Bachianas Brasileiras"	4:25
10.	"Bridal Ballad"	4:36
11.	"Mists of Islay"	2:46
12.	"O mio babbino caro"	2:32
13.	"Laudate Dominum"	4:27
14.	"Wiegenlied"	3:41
15.	"She Moves Through the Fair"	4:36
16.	"Dido's Lament"	3:46

Cover of second release

Second version

1. May It Be
2. The Water Is Wide
3. Dell'amore non si sa
4. Lascia ch'io pianga
5. Prayer
6. Ave Maria
7. Scarborough Fair
8. Quanta Qualia
9. O mio babbino caro
10. What You Never Know (Won't Hurt You)
11. Both Sides, Now
12. Mists of Islay
13. Laudate Dominum
14. She Moves Through The Fair

=== US Version ===
1. Prayer – 4:21
2. Both Sides, Now – 3:43
3. Never Saw Blue [Full Length Drums Mix] – 4:37
4. Dell'amore non si sa – 3:45
5. What You Never Know (Won't Hurt You) [Sunrise Mix] – 3:43
6. May It Be – 3:39
7. Quanta Qualia – 4:25
8. You Are Water – 4:03
9. She Moves Through the Fair – 4:35
10. My Heart Belongs to You [US Mix] – 4:41
11. Ave Maria – 3:44
12. I Say Grace – 5:06

==== iTunes exclusive EP tracks ====
1. "Mary, Did You Know?" (Orchestral Version) – 3:29
2. Vesperae solennes de confessore, K. 339 (Mozart): "Laudate Dominum" – 4:27
3. Gianni Schicchi: "O mio babbino caro" – 2:32
4. Dido and Aeneas: "Dido's Lament" ("When I am laid in earth") – 3:43

== Charts ==
Chart performance for Odyssey
Chart (2005)	Peak position
Australian Albums (ARIA)	21
New Zealand Albums (RMNZ)	1
UK Albums (Official Charts)	10
US Top Classical Albums (Billboard)	3

== Certifications ==
Region	Certification	Certified units/sales
New Zealand (RMNZ)	3× Platinum	45,000^{^}
United Kingdom (BPI)	Gold	100,000^{^}
^{^} Shipments figures based on certification alone.
