= Pōkarekare Ana =

New Zealand love song

"Pōkarekare Ana" is a traditional New Zealand love song, probably communally composed about the time World War I began in 1914. The song is written in Māori and has been translated into English. It enjoys widespread popularity in New Zealand as well as some popularity in other countries.

== Composition ==
Eastern Maori politicians Paraire Tomoana and Āpirana Ngata published the song in 1919, but neither of them claimed to have composed it. They explained that it had "emanated North of Auckland" and was popularised by Māori soldiers who were training near Auckland before embarking for the war in Europe.

The Māori words have remained virtually unaltered over the decades, with only the waters in the first line being localised. For example, some versions refer to Lake Rotorua in the North Island. It is then associated with the story of Hinemoa swimming across the lake to her forbidden lover, Tūtānekai, on Mokoia Island. However, there have been many different English translations.

"Pōkarekare Ana" was originally written predominantly in triple time, with the verse in duple time, but has been more commonly heard in duple time since World War II.

== Lyrics and melody ==
From Anon. (1926). Two Maori Songs. arranged by Hemi Piripata. Auckland: Arthur Eady – via Alexander Turnbull Library.

Māori

Pōkarekare ana,
ngā wai o Waiapu
Whiti atu koe hine,
marino ana e.

Refrain
E hine e,
hoki mai ra.
Ka mate ahau
I te aroha e.

Tuhituhi taku reta,
tuku atu taku rīngi,
Kia kite tō iwi
raru raru ana e.
Refrain

Whati whati taku pene
ka pau aku pepa
Ko taku aroha
mau tonu ana e.
Refrain

E kore te aroha
e maroke i te rā
Mākūkū tonu i
aku roimata e.
Refrain

English

They are agitated,
the waters of Waiapu,
But when you cross over girl,
they will be calm.

Refrain
Oh girl,
return to me,
I could die
of love for you.

I have written my letter,
I have sent my ring,
so that your people can see
that I am troubled.
Refrain

My poor pen is shattered,
I have no more paper,
But my love
is still steadfast.
Refrain

My love will never
be dried by the sun,
it will be forever moistened
by my tears.
Refrain

== Use ==
The song is very popular in New Zealand, and has been adapted for multiple purposes, including in advertising and by sporting groups. Notable uses include:

- "Sailing Away", which promoted New Zealand's 1987 America's Cup challenge, and featured an ensemble choir of famous New Zealanders recording as "All of Us".
- It was used in multiple TV advertisements for Air New Zealand in the 1990s (using a recording with Kiri Te Kanawa) and in 2000. Air New Zealand also used the song again in 2020 to mark the 80th birthday of New Zealand's national airline, this time, using a recording from Hayley Westenra. For the airline's 85th anniversary, it was performed by Marlon Williams.
- In April 2013, members and spectators in the New Zealand Parliament sang "Pōkarekare Ana" after the house passed the bill legalising same-sex marriage in New Zealand.

In popular culture, "Pōkarekare Ana" was used as the theme song for the 2005 South Korean film Crying Fist.

In Civilization VI: Gathering Storm, the 2019 expansion pack for Civilization VI, the main theme for the added Māori civilization is "Pōkarekare Ana" and the haka "Ka Mate". There are four renditions of the theme, each corresponding to a different era in the game. These renditions were composed by Geoff Knorr and Phill Boucher.

== Versions ==
=== Recordings ===
Dozens of recording artists throughout the world have performed and recorded the song.

A version of "Pōkarekare Ana" by Rhonda Bryers appears on the 1981 CBS various artists album The Mauri Hikitia.

Richard Clayderman recorded an instrumental version in 1984, which appeared on the album Memories.

Among New Zealand opera singers to record and perform "Pōkarekare Ana" are Kiri Te Kanawa and Malvina Major.

"Pōkarekare Ana" was featured on the 2003 album Pure, by the New Zealand soprano Hayley Westenra.

A version of the song features on the self-titled album by Angelis, a British classical crossover singing group.

On the CD Classical-Crossover Compilation 2011, Hollie Steel sings "Pōkarekare Ana". Steel later released the song as a charity single for those suffering from the 2011 earthquake in Christchurch, New Zealand.

=== Adaptations ===
Pōkarekare Ana has been translated into many languages.

It was known that the song was introduced to South Korea by New Zealand soldiers fighting in the Korean War (although there is no record of New Zealand soldiers spreading the song during Korean War). It was eventually given Korean lyrics and a Korean title, "Yeonga" (Korean: 연가), and has become popular across the country.

Since the 1960s, it has been sung in Timor-Leste under the title "Ha'u Hakerek Surat Ida". The lyrics are by Momô dos Mártires.

The melody of "Pōkarekare Ana" was used for an Irish hymn to the Blessed Virgin: "A Mhuire Mháthair, sé seo mo ghuí".

A homophonous translation into Hebrew was composed in 2007 by Ghil'ad Zuckermann. In this translation the approximate sounds of the Māori words are retained while Hebrew words with similar meanings are used. In this translation, however, "Waiapu" is replaced by "Rotorua" (oto rúakh, Hebrew for "that wind").

Norwegian soprano Sissel covered this song on her 1989 album Soria Moria also exists.
