= Pure (Hayley Westenra album) =

Studio album by Hayley Westenra
- Released: 10 July 2003
- Recorded: February–April 2003
- Studios: Air Lyndhurst and Eastcote, London
- Genres: Classical crossover; pop
- Length: 48:36
- Label: Decca Music Group
- Producer: Giles Martin

Hayley Westenra chronology
My Gift to You (2001)	Pure (2003)	Odyssey (2005)

Pure is the first internationally released album by New Zealand soprano Hayley Westenra. It became the highest-selling New Zealand album, which Westenra was awarded for at the New Zealand Music Awards of 2004. It was published by the Decca Music Group label in 2003. It was distributed in the United States by Universal Classics in 2004. During its first week of sales it sold 19,068 copies. As of 2007, Pure is the best-selling classical album of the 21st century in the UK, and in New Zealand remains the best-selling album by a New Zealand artist.

Pure features takes on well known classical pieces, as well as pop and traditional Māori choral singing, including renditions of "Who Painted the Moon Black?", "Hine e Hine" (a song in Māori), "In Trutina", from Orff's Carmina Burana, "Wuthering Heights" (a cover of the Kate Bush hit), and the hymn "Amazing Grace". Sir George Martin co-wrote the track "Beat of Your Heart" just for the album. Also on the album is "Pokarekare Ana", a New Zealand love song that has become Westenra's signature song. "Never Say Goodbye" is an adaptation of the tune from Maurice Ravel's solo piano piece Pavane pour une infante défunte.

Pure topped the New Zealand Album Chart for eighteen weeks, being certified 12× Platinum, as well as topping the Australian and UK Classical Albums Charts.

Pure was recorded at Air Lyndhurst and Eastcote Studios in London, England.

== Track listing ==
=== New Zealand version ===
1. "Who Painted the Moon Black"
2. "Beat of Your Heart"
3. "Never Say Goodbye"
4. "Dark Waltz" (composed and written by Frank Musker, Matteo Saggese and Umberto Morasca)
5. "Heaven"
6. "In Trutina"
7. "Across the Universe of Time"
8. "River of Dreams"
9. "Wuthering Heights"
10. "My Heart and I"
11. "Benedictus"
12. "Hine e Hine"

Collector's edition bonus CD

1. "Pokarekare Ana"
2. "Amazing Grace"
3. "The Mummers' Dance"
4. "Mary Did You Know"
5. "Silent Night, Holy Night"
6. "Away in a Manger"

=== Australian version ===
1. "Across the Universe of Time"
2. "Never Say Goodbye"
3. "Beat of Your Heart"
4. "Pokarekare Ana"
5. "Who Painted the Moon Black?"
6. "River of Dreams"
7. "Benedictus"
8. "Hine e Hine"
9. "Dark Waltz"
10. "Amazing Grace"
11. "My Heart and I"
12. "In Trutina"
13. "Heaven"
14. "Wuthering Heights"
15. "Pokarekare Ana" (duet with Russell Watson)

Collector's edition bonus CD

1. "Silent Night"
2. "Away in a Manger"
3. "Mary Did You Know"
4. "The Mummers' Dance"

=== UK version ===
1. "Pokarekare Ana"
2. "Never Say Goodbye"
3. "Who Painted the Moon Black?"
4. "River of Dreams"
5. "Benedictus"
6. "Hine e Hine"
7. "Dark Waltz"
8. "Amazing Grace"
9. "In Trutina"
10. "Beat of Your Heart"
11. "Heaven"
12. "Wuthering Heights"
13. "Hine e Hine" (Māori mix)

Collector's edition bonus CD

1. "Mary Did You Know"
2. "Bridal Ballad"
3. "Pokarekare Ana" (Vocalise)
4. "My Heart and I"
5. "Across the Universe of Time"
6. "Silent Night, Holy Night"
7. "Away in a Manger"

=== US version ===
1. "Pokarekare Ana (Come Back to Me)" – 3:18
2. "Never Say Goodbye" – 3:13
3. "Who Painted the Moon Black?" – 3:38
4. "River of Dreams" – 4:21
5. "Beat of Your Heart" – 3:13
6. "Amazing Grace" – 3:42
7. "Benedictus" – 3:50
8. "Hine E Hine (Maiden, O Maiden)" – 5:06
9. "Across the Universe of Time" – 3:42
10. "Dark Waltz" – 4:18
11. "In Trutina" (From Carmina Burana) – 2:22
12. "Heaven" – 4:09
13. "Wuthering Heights" – 3:44

=== Japanese version ===
1. "Pokarekare Ana"
2. "Never Say Goodbye"
3. "Who Painted the Moon Black?" (Sonia Aletta Nel / arr. Sarah Class)
4. "River of Dreams" (Vivaldi: The Four Seasons – Winter / arr. Sarah Class)
5. "Benedictus" (Karl Jenkins) (Benedictus)
6. "Hine e Hine" (Māori lullaby / arr. Sarah Class)
7. "Dark Waltz" (Author Frank Musker / arr. Sarah Class)
8. "My Heart and I" (TV drama La piovra theme song)
9. "In Trutina" (Orff: Arrangement from Carmina Burana)
10. "Beat of Your Heart" (Sir George Martin / Giles Martin)
11. "Across the Universe of Time" (Sarah Class)
12. "Heaven" (Frank Musker / Ronan Hardiman)
13. "Wuthering Heights" (Kate Bush / arr. Sarah Class)
14. "Mary Did You Know?" (bonus track)
15. "Amazing Grace" (arr. Sir George Martin; Shiroi Kyotō theme song; bonus track)

=== International version ===
No.	Title	Length
1.	"Pokarekare Ana"
2.	"Never Say Goodbye"
3.	"Who Painted the Moon Black"
4.	"River of Dreams"
5.	"Benedictus"
6.	"Hine e Hine"
7.	"Dark Waltz"
8.	"Amazing Grace"
9.	"My Heart & I"
10.	"In Trutina"
11.	"Beat of Your Heart"
12.	"Across the Universe of Time"
13.	"Heaven"
14.	"Wuthering Heights"

== Personnel ==
- Hayley Westenra – vocals
- Giles Martin – guitar, keyboards, programming
- Robbie McIntosh – guitar
- Tony Ingelby – guitar
- Dave Hartley – piano
- James Brett – keyboards
- Steve Pearce – bass
- Mark Brown – bass
- Andres Kallmark – programming
- Mary Hammond – background vocals
- Royal Philharmonic Orchestra

== Charts ==
=== Weekly charts ===
Weekly chart performance for Pure
Chart (2003–2004)	Peak position
Australian Albums (ARIA)	7
German Albums (Offizielle Top 100)	73
New Zealand Albums (RMNZ)	1
Scottish Albums (Official Charts)	10
UK Albums (Official Charts)	7
US Billboard 200	70
US Top Classical Albums (Billboard)	2
US Heatseekers Albums (Billboard)	13

=== Year-end charts ===
2003 year-end chart performance for Pure
Chart (2003)	Position
Australian Albums (ARIA)	80
New Zealand Albums (RMNZ)	11
UK Albums (OCC)	24

2004 year-end chart performance for Pure
Chart (2004)	Position
New Zealand Albums (RMNZ)	7

== Certifications ==
Certifications for Pure
Region	Certification	Certified units/sales
Australia (ARIA)	Platinum	70,000^{^}
New Zealand (RMNZ)	12× Platinum	180,000^{^}
United Kingdom (BPI)	2× Platinum	600,000^{^}
^{^} Shipments figures based on certification alone.

== See also ==
- List of best-selling albums in New Zealand
