= Hayley Westenra =

New Zealand singer (born 1987)

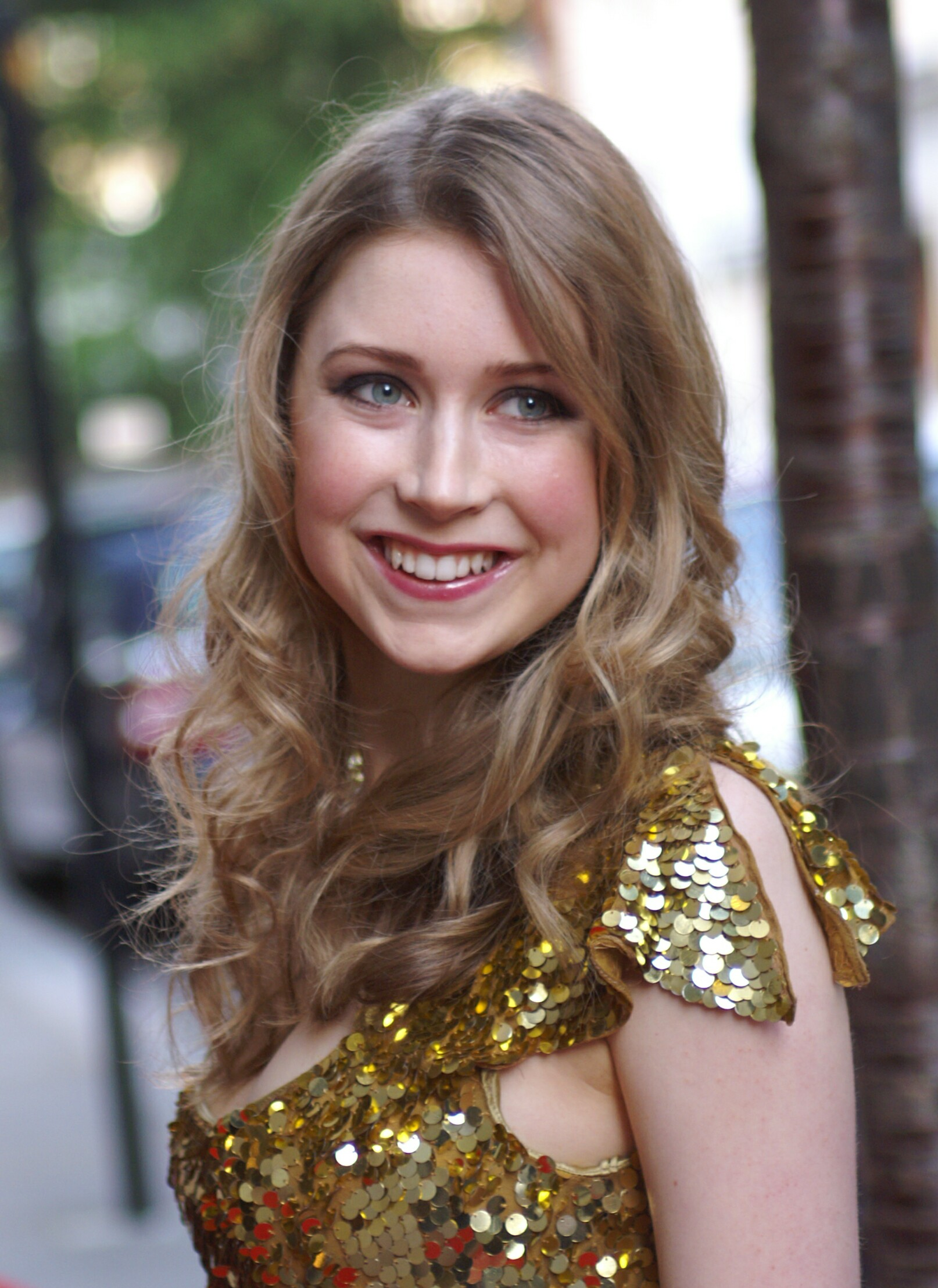
- Westenra in 2006
- Born: Hayley Dee Westenra; 10 April 1987 (age 39); Christchurch, New Zealand
- Occupation: Singer
- Years active: 1998–present
- Musical career
- Genres: Celtic; operatic pop; classical crossover; new-age; rock
- Instruments: Vocals; piano; guitar
- Labels: Universal New Zealand; Decca
- Formerly of: Celtic Woman
- Website: www.hayleywestenra.me

Hayley Dee Westenra (born 10 April 1987) is a New Zealand classical crossover singer. Her first internationally released album, Pure, reached number one on the UK classical charts in 2003 and has sold more than two million copies worldwide, making it one of the fastest selling albums in her country's history.

She is one of the youngest UNICEF Ambassadors to date.

Westenra has sung in English, Māori, Irish, Welsh, Spanish, Italian, German, French, Portuguese, Latin, Japanese, Standard Mandarin Chinese, Catalan, and Taiwanese Hokkien.

== Early life ==
Westenra was born on 10 April 1987 at Christchurch Women's Hospital in Christchurch, New Zealand. Her parents, Gerald and Jill Westenra, have other children. Her sister Sophie is an academic and teaches law at Oxford. Westenra's grandmother Shirley Ireland was a singer, and her grandfather was a pianist who also played the piano accordion. She has Irish, Dutch and English heritage.

She began performing at age six in the Christmas play at her school, Fendalton Open Air School. After the show, a teacher said she was "pitch perfect" and encouraged Westenra to learn how to play a musical instrument; soon after she learned to read music and play the violin, piano, guitar, and recorder. She then began voice lessons and discovered a passion for musical theatre. By age 11, she had performed more than 40 times on stage, and was often given male parts. Westenra attended Cobham Intermediate School in 1998 and 1999, where a performing arts building was later named in her honour.

== Career ==
=== 2000–2002: Debut ===
At the age of 12, Westenra entered a professional recording studio to record Walking in the Air, a demo album originally created for friends and family, with 70 copies made; they soon made 1000 more copies, and attracted attention from a journalist with Canterbury Television, who asked Westenra to appear on air. Gray Bartlett, the director of a concert promotion company, saw the show and shortly after, she was offered a recording deal with Universal Records New Zealand. On that label, Westenra, who in the meantime was attending Burnside High School, with Callum Scott, released a self-titled album of show tunes and light classical songs, as well as My Gift to You, a CD of Christmas music. Following the success of her albums, she was offered and later received lessons from Malvina Major.

=== 2003–2004: Pure ===
Westenra attracted worldwide attention when she signed with Decca Records and recorded Pure, a CD of classical, light pop, and traditional Māori songs. Pure became the fastest-selling international debut album in the history of the UK classical chart, with 19,068 copies purchased in its first week alone, quickly reached No. 1 on the British charts, and entered the UK Album Chart at number 8. Over two million copies of Pure have been sold to date. In New Zealand, Pure has been certified 12 times platinum, making her the best-selling artist, regardless of genre, in the country's history. In 2004 Westenra recorded the end-title song for the Disney movie Mulan II. They also featured her in the national Radio Disney music education tour for middle-school students. Later that year, she was featured in the song "Bridal Ballad" recorded for the movie The Merchant of Venice.

Westenra was the 2004 Vodafone New Zealand Music Awards winner of "Highest Selling New Zealand Album" and "International Achievement Award". On 20 February 2004, Prime Minister Helen Clark awarded her for being the first New Zealand artist to receive the tenfold platinum status in the New Zealand market, where she held the number one artist position for 18 weeks. She has won two Japanese Grammies for her work (Song of the Year, "Amazing Grace" and Album of the Year, Pure). Her version of Amazing Grace was used as the theme song for the popular Japanese drama, Shiroi Kyotō (The White Tower). Westenra met the cast of the series during a promotional tour of Japan in October 2003.

Also in 2004, she began her world tour of New Zealand, Australia, Japan, the UK and the US, performing in a concert in November for Queen Elizabeth II, Prime Minister Tony Blair, Charles, Prince of Wales, Colin Powell, Condoleezza Rice and President George W. Bush. In her autobiography, she remembered feeling more nervous in an audition where she sight read to Andrew Lloyd Webber an unreleased piece that he had written.

After her world tour, Westenra recorded a live DVD, Hayley Westenra: Live from New Zealand, featuring duets with baritone Teddy Tahu Rhodes and soprano Sophie Westenra in St. James Theatre. David Horn, the producer of her live TV special, which aired on the PBS program Great Performances, said, "Her singing is so gorgeous, it's reminiscent of the great boy-soprano sound of Anglican church choirs." She joined the Boston Pops Orchestra as guest soloist for their Christmas tour at the end of 2004.

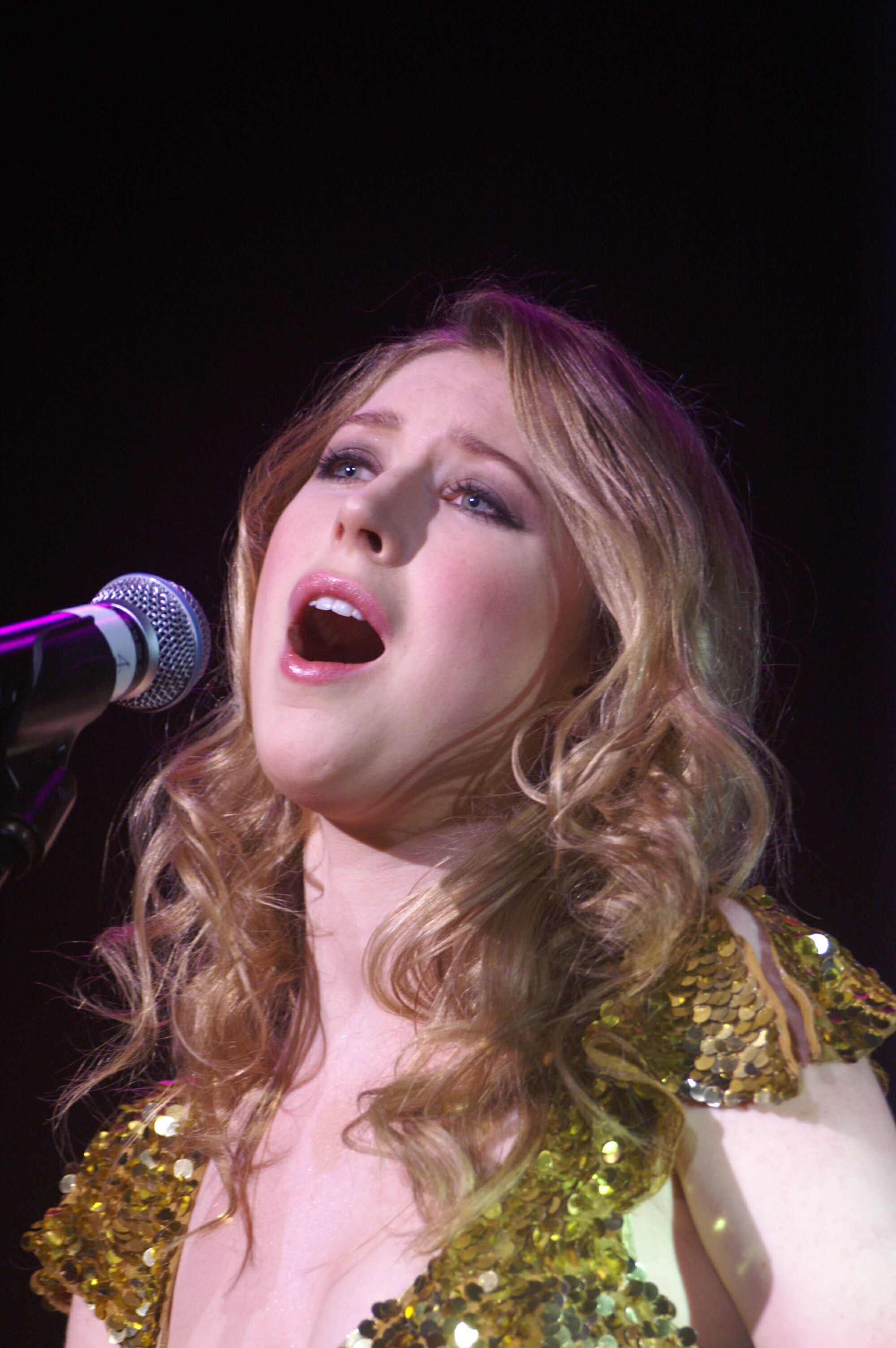
Westenra in 2006

=== 2005–2007: Odyssey; touring with Il Divo; Treasure; and Celtic Woman ===
On 5 September 2006, Westenra was named as one of the ten outstanding young people in the world by the Junior Chamber International, becoming the first New Zealander so honoured. On 13 November 2006, she participated in the dedication of the New Zealand War Memorial in London, performing "God Save the Queen" and "God Defend New Zealand", the national anthems of the UK and New Zealand. Three of Westenra's great-uncles served in World War II; one was killed.

In August 2006, Westenra joined Celtic Woman and is featured on their second major DVD/CD album, Celtic Woman: A New Journey, which was released 30 January 2007 and immediately hit the Billboard Top 200 music chart at number four. She toured with the group in the United States in 2007, with scheduled appearances in 88 venues across the country; the tour ended in June. During this time, Westenra alternated with Méav Ní Mhaolchatha, who had recently returned from maternity leave, to maintain a five-member line-up. She considered that the toughest tour she had been on to date, and wrote in her second biography that she preferred having control of her own schedule as a solo performer.

Westenra's third international album, Treasure, was released on 26 February 2007 in the UK. All the songs on this CD were chosen by Westenra, who gave her record company "no say in the matter." She said, "I basically didn't let them in on what I was recording until the last minute so they had no choice. I didn't give them much room to disagree."

Tracks on this album include "E Pari Ra", "One Fine Day", "Let Me Lie", "Danny Boy", and "Abide with Me". Westenra co-wrote four of the fifteen tracks, and the album also features singer Humphrey Berney. The US/Australia/NZ edition followed in March under the name Celtic Treasure. Westenra dedicated the album to her grandmother, Shirley Ireland. Inside the sleeve of the British edition, she wrote:

"I come from a musical family, and one with a real sense of history. My forefathers were on the maiden voyage from Ireland to Christchurch, New Zealand in 1850 – there's even a commemoration plaque in Cathedral Square, Christchurch, which bears the name Westenra. My grandmother used to sit me on her knee and sing songs like Danny Boy from as early as I can remember. A singer herself in her earlier years, she has always been a never-ending source of songs. It's this legacy of music that she's been passing down to me since my childhood, and it's many of these beautiful old songs that I've explored here on my album."

On the day before St. Patrick's Day 2007, she performed as part of Celtic Woman for President George W. Bush at the White House. She had plans to present the president with a petition to place a mandatory carbon cap on the United States. The goal of the petition was compliance with the commitment made by President Bill Clinton in previous years to follow the Kyoto Protocol.

Also in 2007, Westenra's vocals were featured in the soundtracks of the movie Flood and the television series, Jekyll, composed by Debbie Wiseman, in the UK. In November 2007, Westenra successfully staged a Japan "Treasure" concert tour in Fukuoka, Sapporo, Tokyo, Sendai, Nagoya, Osaka, Yokohama, Hiroshima.

=== 2008–2010: Hayley Sings Japanese Songs; and Paradiso ===
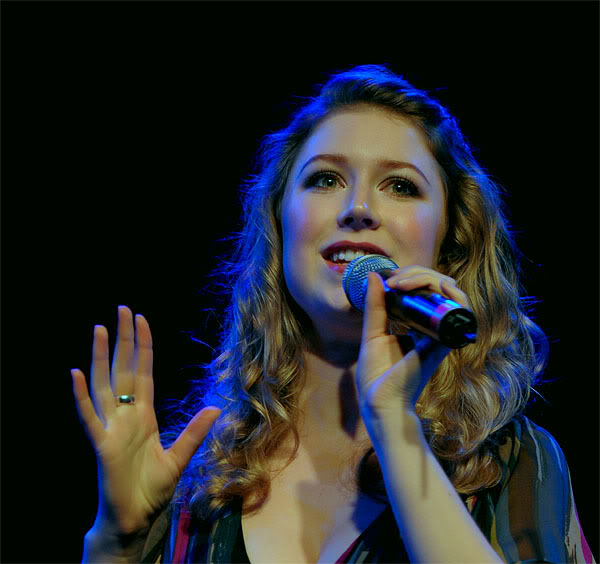
Westenra in 2009

In early 2008, Westenra provided guest vocals for the Mike Oldfield album Music of the Spheres, performing the vocal on the track "On My Heart" and its reprise. Westenra and Oldfield performed "On My Heart" live on the British ITV daytime TV program The Alan Titchmarsh Show on 18 March 2008.

On 1 October 2008, Westenra recorded solo vocals on the CD Different Voice, composed and conducted by Debbie Wiseman and the Royal Philharmonic Orchestra, with narration by Stephen Fry and lyrics written by Don Black. On 30 November 2008, Westenra was presented by Elaine Paige with the Variety Club Showbiz Awards 2008 Classical Performer of the Year for raising money to help sick, disabled and disadvantaged children and young people.

In the spring and summer of 2010, Westenra began working with film composer Ennio Morricone for a collaboration on her album Paradiso. The album featured new songs written by Morricone, as well as some of his best known film compositions of the last 50 years. Westenra recorded the album with Morricone's orchestra in Rome during the summer 2010.

On 30 October 2010, Westenra staged a recital at the Shanghai Grand Theatre with international backing musicians in an East Asian concert tour.

=== 2011–present: Various concerts and the China Tour ===
On Memorial Day, 29 May 2011, Westenra was invited to perform for the annual PBS special, the National Memorial Day Concert live in Washington, D.C. She performed the song "Pie Jesu" following the emotional story of a woman who had never met her father, who died in the Vietnam War, but got to know him many years later through a soldier who had fought alongside him. On 22 July, Westenra was among artists performing with the BBC Concert Orchestra in an American West-themed show on the BBC radio concert programme Friday Night Is Music Night.

On 23 October 2011, Westenra performed the New Zealand national anthem "God Defend New Zealand" at Eden Park in Auckland before the final of the 2011 Rugby World Cup, and also performed the traditional New Zealand song "Now Is the Hour" to bring the event to a close.

In October 2011, Songs of Praise broadcast "Whispers in a Dream" and "Amazing Grace" performed by Westenra in Salisbury Cathedral. On 31 October 2011, Westenra was featured on André Rieu's classical music album And the Waltz Goes On with the vocal track "Dreaming of New Zealand".

To promote Paradiso, Westenra embarked on the Paradiso Homecoming Tour from 17 September 2011 to 8 March 2012. On 12 March 2012, Westenra attended a reception for celebrating the achievements of inspirational women today the event held by the Duchess of Cornwall to mark Commonwealth Day. On 22 April 2012, Westenra staged a debut concert at the Koncerthuset in Copenhagen and on 14 June, Westenra staged a concert with RTÉ Concert Orchestra and David Brophy at National Concert Hall in Dublin.

In April 2013, Westenra staged a Far East tour in Taipei, Tainan, Kaohsiung and performed with Chinese tenor DinYi in Beijing. On 30 November and 1 December 2013, Westenra staged a concert with City Chamber Orchestra of Hong Kong, Hong Kong Welsh Male Voice Choir and the Hong Kong Treble Choir in Hong Kong.

On 29 April 2014, Westenra was one of the performers at Classic FM Live in Royal Albert Hall London.

== Performances ==
=== 2000s ===
On 24 August 2003, Westenra performed on the stage with opera tenor José Carreras and Bryn Terfel in front of the capacity crowd of 10,000 people from Faenol Festival in Wales.

On 28 July 2004, Westenra joined American tenor James Doing and the Wisconsin Chamber Orchestra on the latter's annual Concerts on the Square in Madison, capital city of Wisconsin. The concert was broadcast by Wisconsin Public Television. On 18 December 2005, she made an appearance on Kurt Browning's programme Gotta Skate, in which she performed with Andrea Bocelli. She was guest soloist with the Boston Pops Orchestra for their Christmas tour of the east coast of the United States in December 2004.

In 2006 as a part of the Canterbury Festival (27 Oct), Westenra performed a concert with tenor Alfie Boe in Canterbury Cathedral. On 6 May 2007, Westenra was invited to the Crystal Cathedral as a guest performing "Abide with Me" on the Hour of Power, an American Christian television program. She had performed there twice before, the first time singing "Amazing Grace" and the second time "I Say Grace".

On 28 July 2007, she starred in Woburn LIVE 2007, where she performed a selection of the music of West Side Story with the other recording artists, including Vittorio Grigolo, from the 2007 release. On 7 August, Westenra performed solo and duet with Malvina Major at St James's Church, Piccadilly among ChristChurch Cathedral Choir 2008 UK Tour.

On 17 August 2008, Westenra participated in the tribute concert Lyrics by Don Black, which was held at the London Palladium and featured performances of Black's songs by a selection of guest artists. She sang the duet Amigos Para Siempre, the score of which was written by Andrew Lloyd Webber, with Jonathan Ansell. The evening, hosted by Michael Parkinson, was recorded by on the BBC Radio 2 program Friday Night Is Music Night and broadcast on 22 August 2008. On 8 November, Westenra performed at the Festival of Remembrance at the Royal Albert Hall, singing "River of Dreams", duet "Today Won't Come Again", written by Geoff Stevens and Don Black, with English tenor Jonathan Ansell, and accompanied Ansell on Here's to the Heroes, by Black and John Barry, when returning soldiers proceeded into the auditorium. The Annual Festival of Remembrance was broadcast by the BBC.

On 7 November 2009, Westenra performed again at the Festival of Remembrance, singing "We'll Meet Again" at the Royal Albert Hall, in the presence of Queen Elizabeth II and Vera Lynn, who had made the song famous during World War II. In December 2009, Westenra performed with Faryl Smith and Camilla Kerslake in a special service for British troops serving in Afghanistan from St Clements Church, London. On 13 November 2010, Westenra performed for a third time at the Festival of Remembrance, singing "For the Fallen", a poem by Laurence Binyon set to music by Karl Jenkins. It is featured on the special 10th anniversary edition of Karl Jenkins' The Armed Man: A Mass for Peace. In April 2011, Westenra was invited as a guest performer to Mario Frangoulis TV concert in Greek. On May, Westenra was a guest performer on Italian tenor Andrea Bocelli's The Magic of Love Asian concert tour; Westenra and Bocelli had previously collaborated on Westenra's album Odyssey and live performances. On 9 July 2011, Westenra was invited as a guest performer to Joseph Calleja's annual concert in Malta.

=== 2010s ===
On 20 September 2011, Westenra sang Laurence Binyon's "For The Fallen" on the service of the 90th anniversary of the Royal British Legion held at Westminster Abbey in the presence of The Princess Royal, Church of England members and family of Royal Marines. On 5 December, Westenra performed solo "Whispers in a Dream" and duet with Rolando on the Royal Variety Performance in the presence of the Princess Royal.

On 16 March 2012, Westenra was invited to perform and make the presentation to the winner of the Korean live TV show Operastar. On 28 April 2012, Westenra performed with Chinese tenor Din Yi and Nie Jian Hua on the 2nd Beijing International Film Festival symphony concert at Olympic Green accompanying by Royal Philharmonic Orchestra.

In May 2012, Westenra was featured with Laura Wright and Alfie Boe on the souvenir album Gary Barlow & The Commonwealth Band in celebration of the Diamond Jubilee of Elizabeth II. On 21 June, Westenra performed at Greek tenor Mario Frangoulis' Boston Symphony Hall concert accompanying by Boston Pops Orchestra.

In November 2012, Westenra was a guest performer on the David Foster & Friends' Far East tour.

== Film, television and video game appearances ==
She took her first acting role on the US programme American Dreams ("Charade"), where she played guitar and sang "Who Painted the Moon Black?"

Westenra provided vocals for the music of the 2007 Wii game Endless Ocean.

On 27 July 2011, Westenra was announced as the voice of UK broadcaster ITV's coverage of that year's Rugby World Cup, with her special version of "World in Union".

== Philanthropy and charity ==
=== In the 2000s ===
Westenra is active in contributing to charities around the world. On 26 November 2003, Westenra performed "Pokarekare Ana" and "Amazing Grace" on the 75th anniversary of the Royal Variety Performance show in the presence of Queen Elizabeth II and Prince Philip on behalf of the Entertainment Artistes' Benevolent Fund.

Hayley performed at the Royal Concert Hall, Glasgow along with the Black Dyke Band as guests of Govan Salvation Army Songsters (choir). The songsters & band accompanied Hayley in a performance of ‘Hine e Hine’.

Westenra is the second youngest UNICEF Ambassador to date, behind Selena Gomez. In 2005, Westenra visited Ghana to publicise her project, "Bikes for Ghana", and actively helped with fundraising to purchase bicycles for young girls, allowing them to get to their schools from outlying surrounding areas.

In 2006, a new Hybrid Tea Rose was named in honour of Westenra to raise charity funds for UNICEF. The Hayley Westenra Rose won the 2010 Rose of the Year Award and also the best Hybrid Tea Rose Award. In June 2006, she appeared at a fundraiser for UK charity Act Against Bullying. On 24 February 2007, Westenra took part in the HemiHelp "Children Helping Children" concert at Cadogan Hall, Sloane Square, London in front of 900 people, including the charity's patron Princess Alexandra. On 8 June 2007, Westenra performed in a fundraising concert for Bikes for Ghana at the Victoria Hall in Stoke-on-Trent.

On 4 September 2008, Westenra became a patron of Royal New Zealand Air Force. Also in September, Westenra sang for the British Armed Forces in Basra, Iraq, where she helped to launch the Poppy Appeal. In October, Westenra and tenor Jonathan Ansell took to the streets to sell poppies at Waterloo Station to support the Royal British Legion. She has also been the ambassador for Save the Children in Hong Kong. More recently, she took part in a breast cancer awareness campaign in New Zealand. One of the other charities that she helps is the Women's Environmental Network. Another major charity she supports is the Nordoff-Robbins Center for Music Therapy, which provides help for children who are disabled.

On 7 September 2009, she joined the Dame Vera Lynn Trust, a charity for children with cerebral palsy, as a vice-president. On 22 October, the original Second World War Forces Sweetheart Dame Vera Lynn was joined by Westenra in launching the Poppy Appeal for 2009 with a fundraising goal of £31 million. On 6 October, Westenra, whose uncle served in the Royal New Zealand Air Force, contributed to the charity CD We Will Remember Them.

=== In the 2010s ===
On 3 March 2011, Westenra, whose hometown is Christchurch, sang the national anthem "God Defend New Zealand" at a vigil service for the February 2011 Christchurch earthquake at Westminster Cathedral, attended by about 5,000 New Zealanders. On 18 March, Westenra performed "Amazing Grace" in the national Christchurch memorial service at Hagley Park in Christchurch. On 27 March, Westenra was invited to read aloud a testimony as part of the Christchurch memorial service at Westminster Abbey.

During her Paradiso Homecoming Tour from 17 September 2011 to 8 March 2012, Westenra raised charity attention to her UNICEF Goodwill Ambassador appeal and the Christchurch Earthquake Relief fund to help Christchurch rebuild.

On 24 August 2012, Westenra staged a concert in the Gŵyl Gobaith Music Festival in Wales to support for charities Cancer Research UK, Wales Air Ambulance, CLIC Sargent and HeadtoHeart. In Christmastime 2012, Westenra was featured on the album Starship Christmas Album along with Justin Bieber and others, to support Starship Children's Health. On 30 November, Westenra lent her support to Kate Winslet's Golden Hat Foundation for a concert in Carnegie Hall. She appeared again for that cause at Carnegie Hall in December 2016.

== Personal life ==
In 2013, Westenra married French-born Arnaud Sabard, who worked as a sound engineer during her tours. They have since divorced.

In 2019, Westenra married record producer Chris McFarland (aka Chris Gaelan). They divorced in 2022.

Hayley and her partner, Travis, welcomed their first child in July 2022 and second child in August 2026.

== Discography ==
=== International studio albums ===
- Pure (2003)
- Odyssey (2005)
- Treasure (2007)
- Winter Magic (2009) (Christmas Magic in Australia and New Zealand)
- Paradiso (2011)
- Hushabye (2013)

=== Regional studio albums ===
- Walking in the Air (Hayley Westenra album) (2000)
- Hayley Westenra (2001)
- My Gift to You (2001)
- Crystal (2006)
- Hayley Sings Japanese Songs (2008)
- Hayley Sings Japanese Songs 2 (2009)
- World in Union (2011)
- Hayley Westenra – The Best (2014)

=== Compilations ===
- River of Dreams: The Very Best of Hayley Westenra (2008 Regional)
- The Best of Pure Voice (2010 International)
- The Best of Hayley Sings Japanese Songs (2012 Regional)
