= Shihad discography =

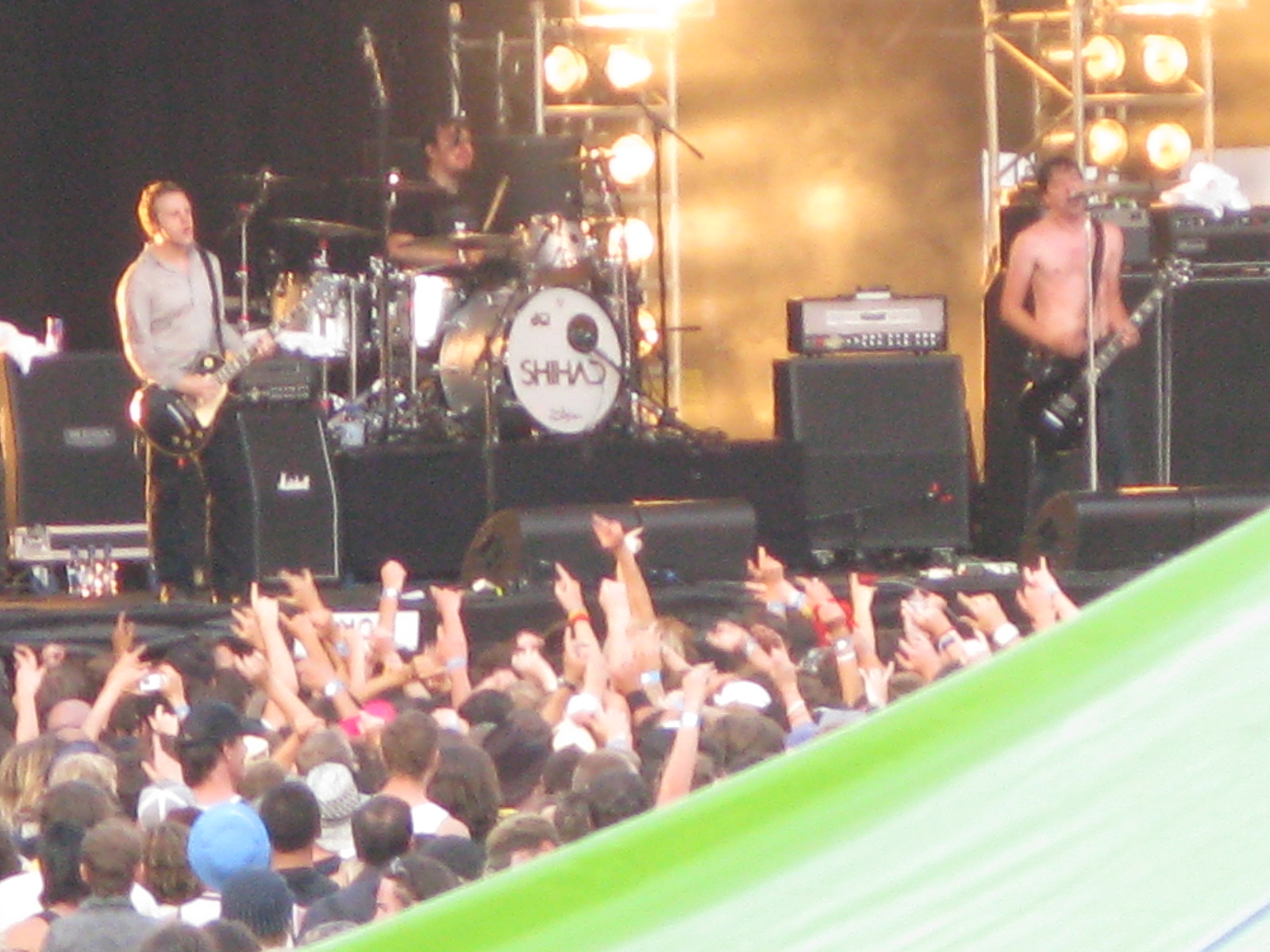
- Shihad performing in 2008
- Studio albums: 10
- EPs: 8
- Live albums: 1
- Compilation albums: 1
- Singles: 36
- Music videos: 40

The discography of Shihad, a New Zealand rock band, consists of ten studio albums, one live album, one compilation album, eight EPs, 36 singles and 40 music videos.

Shihad's first release was the Devolve EP, released in 1990. Its most recent release is the 2021 album Old Gods. Their discography includes two albums, one EP and four singles from the period of 2002 to 2003, that were released under the name band Pacifier. Shihad received music video funding grants from broadcast funding agency NZ On Air for 31 music videos, the most any New Zealand artist has had funded.

== Albums ==
=== Studio albums ===
List of albums, with selected chart positions and certifications
Title	Album details	Peak chart positions		Certifications
Title	Album details	NZ	AUS	Certifications
Churn	Released: 12 July 1993; Label: Wildside	9	—	RMNZ: Gold
Killjoy	Released: 19 May 1995; Label: Wildside	4	—	RMNZ: Platinum
Shihad	Released: 25 October 1996; Label: Wildside; Also known as The Fish Album	11	—	RMNZ: Platinum
The General Electric	Released: 2 October 1999; Label: Wildside	1	23	RMNZ: 3× Platinum; ARIA: Gold
Pacifier	Released: 19 August 2002; Label: WEA, Warner Music Group, Arista, BMG; Released under band name Pacifier	1	8	RMNZ: 2× Platinum
Love Is the New Hate	Released: 2 May 2005; Label: WEA, Warner Music Group	2	11	RMNZ: Platinum
Beautiful Machine	Released: 21 April 2008; Label: WEA, Warner Music Group	1	11	RMNZ: Gold
Ignite	Released: 20 September 2010; Label: Roadrunner (AUS), Warner Music Group (NZ)	1	44	RMNZ: Gold
FVEY	Released: 8 August 2014; Label: Roadrunner (AUS), Warner Music Group (NZ)	1	9	RMNZ: Gold
Old Gods	Released: 8 October 2021; Label: ADA, Warner	1	15	
"—" denotes a recording that did not chart or was not released in that territory.

=== Live albums ===
List of albums, with selected chart positions and certifications
Title	Album details	Peak chart positions	Certifications
Title	Album details	NZ	Certifications
Pacifier: Live	Released: 23 November 2003; Label: WEA, Warner Music Group; Released under band name Pacifier	19	NZ: Gold

=== Compilation albums ===
List of compilation albums, with selected chart positions and certifications
Title	Album details	Peak chart positions	Certifications
Title	Album details	NZ	Certifications
The Meanest Hits	Released: 7 November 2011; Label: WEA, Warner Music Group	7	NZ: Platinum

== EPs ==
List of EPs, with selected chart positions
Title	Album details	Peak Chart Positions
Title	Album details	NZ
Devolve	Released: 1990; Format: LP (1990), CD (1991); Catalogue: PACD1073/4357732	16
Happy Families Tour	Released: 1995; Catalogue: N 0258-3; Split with Head Like A Hole and SML	—
B-Sides	Released: 1996; Catalogue: HAD 0022; Released as a giveaway with Killjoy in 1996	—
Flaming Soul/Gates of Steel	Released: 1997; Catalogue: ML10688	—
Blue Light Disco	Released: October 1998; Catalogue: HAD092	17
Suck On This	Released: 2002; Catalogue: ARPCD-5213; Released as Pacifier	—
Alive	Released: 15 February 2005; Catalogue: 5046766592	6
ZM Live Lounge	Released: 20 May 2008; Format: Digital download	—
"—" denotes a recording that did not chart or was not released in that territory.

== Singles ==
List of singles, with selected chart positions and certifications
Title	Year	Peak chart positions			Certifications	Album
Title	Year	NZ	AUS	US Rock	Certifications	Album
"I Only Said"	1993	3	—	—		Churn
"Stations"	1994	35	—	—		Churn
"Derail"	1994	33	—	—		Churn
"You Again"	1995	20	—	—		Killjoy
"Bitter"	1995	20	—	—		Killjoy
"Gimme Gimme"	1995	39	—	—		Killjoy
"Deb's Night Out"	1996	41	—	—		Killjoy
"La La Land"	1996	39	—	—		Shihad
"It's a Go" (Note: "It's a Go" was released as a single exclusively in Europe.)	1996	—	—	—		Shihad
"A Day Away"	1997	44	—	—		Shihad
"Home Again"	1997	42	—	—	RMNZ: Platinum	Shihad
"Yr Head Is a Rock"	1998	45	—	—		Shihad
"Ghost from the Past" (Note: "Ghost from the Past" and "Right Outta Nowhere" were released exclusively as singles in Australia.)	1998	—	—	—		Shihad
"My Mind's Sedate"	1999	6	90	—		The General Electric
"The General Electric"	2000	22	—	—		The General Electric
"Pacifier"	2000	48	83	—	RMNZ: Platinum	The General Electric
"Sport and Religion"	2000	—	—	—		The General Electric
"Comfort Me" (as Pacifier)	2002	34	40	—		Pacifier
"Run" (as Pacifier)	2002	36	64	—	RMNZ: Gold	Pacifier
"Bullitproof" (as Pacifier)	2003	48	58	27		Pacifier
"Everything" (as Pacifier)	2003	36	—	—		Pacifier
"Alive"	2005	5	38	—		Love Is the New Hate
"All the Young Fascists"	2005	—	59	—		Love Is the New Hate
"Shot in the Head"	2005	—	—	—		Love Is the New Hate
"Dark Times"	2005	—	—	—		Love Is the New Hate
"None of the Above"	2006	—	—	—		Love Is the New Hate
"One Will Hear the Other"	2008	21	—	—		Beautiful Machine
"Vampires"	2008	31	—	—		Beautiful Machine
"Beautiful Machine"	2008	—	—	—		Beautiful Machine
"Rule the World"	2008	—	—	—		Beautiful Machine
"Sleepeater"	2010	36	—	—		Ignite
"Lead or Follow"	2010	—	—	—		Ignite
"Right Outta Nowhere"	2012	—	—	—		The Meanest Hits
"Think You're So Free"	2014	40	—	—		FVEY
"I Got You"	2020	—	—	—		True Colours, New Colours – The Songs of Split Enz
"Tear Down Those Names"	2021	— (Note: "Tear Down Those Names" did not enter the NZ Top 40 Singles Chart, but peaked at number 39 on the NZ Hot Singles Chart.)	—	—		Old Gods
"Little Demons"	2021	—	—	—		Old Gods
"Feel the Fire"	2021	— (Note: "Feel the Fire" did not enter the NZ Top 40 Singles Chart, but peaked at number 21 on the NZ Hot Singles Chart.)	—	—		Old Gods
"Empire Falling"	2021	—	—	—		Old Gods
"—" denotes a recording that did not chart or was not released in that territory.

== Music videos ==
Year	Song	Director
1992	"What We Get"	
1993	"I Only Said"	Nigel Streeter
1994	"Stations"	Matt Palmer
1994	"Derail"	Joe Fisher
1995	"You Again"	Darryl Ward
1995	"Bitter"	Darryl Ward
1995	"Gimme Gimme"	Glen Standring
1996	"Deb's Night Out"	Chris Mauger
1996	"La La Land"	Kevin Spring
1996	"It's a Go"	Kevin Spring
1996	"A Day Away"	Kevin Spring
1997	"Home Again"	Mark Hartley
1998	"Yr Head is a Rock"	Greg Page
1998	"Ghost from the Past"	Julian Boshier
1998	"Interconnector"	Julian Boshier
1999	"Wait and See"	Reuben Sutherland
1999	"My Mind's Sedate"	Reuben Sutherland
2000	"The General Electric"	Paul Butler and Scott Walton
2000	The General Electric (alternate version)	Reuben Sutherland
2000	"Pacifier"	Jolyon Watkins
2000	"Sport and Religion"	Aaron Dustin
2002	"Comfort Me"	Nash Edgerton
2002	"Run"	Jolyon Watkins
2003	"Bullitproof"	
2003	"Everything"	
2003	"Home Again Live"	
2005	"Alive"	Gary Sullivan
2005	"All the Young Fascists"	Mark Alberson
2005	"Shot in the Head"	Simon Ward
2005	"Dark Times"	Simon Ward
2006	"None of the Above"	Hinge Design
2008	"One Will Hear the Other"	Adam Jones
2008	"Vampires"	Adam Jones
2008	"Beautiful Machine"	Sam Peacocke
2008	"Rule the World"	Adam Jones
2010	"Sleepeater"	Sam Peacocke
2010	"Lead or Follow"	Tim Van Dammen
2010	"Ignite"	Tim Van Dammen
2011	"Engage"	James Soloman
2014	"Think You're So Free"	Sam Peacocke
2014	"FVEY"	Phil Knight
2014	"Song For No One"	Robert Wallace
2021	"Tear Down Those Names"	Shae Sterling
2021	"Feel the Fire"	Shae Sterling
