= List of number-one albums in New Zealand by New Zealand artists =

This is a list of number-one albums by New Zealand artists in New Zealand from the Official New Zealand Music Chart albums chart.

== List ==
Key

‡ – Number-one single of the year.
† – Number-one single of the year, of New Zealand origin.

Reached number one	Title	Artist	Weeks at number one
5 March 1976	Bill & Boyd	Bill & Boyd	1
19 November 1976	The World's Great Classics	New Zealand Symphony Orchestra	1
2 March 1980	True Colours	Split Enz	3
8 June 1980	Space Race	Mi-Sex	4
19 April 1981	Waiata	Split Enz	3
25 April 1982	Cool Bananas	DD Smash	1
2 May 1982	Time and Tide	Split Enz	6
23 January 1983	Enz of an Era	Split Enz	2
21 August 1983	Escapade	Tim Finn	1
10 September 1989	Piano by Candlelight II	Carl Doy	4
24 June 1990	Submarine Bells	The Chills	2
2 September 1990	Together Again	Gray Bartlett, Jodi Vaughan, Brendan Dugan	1
30 September 1990	Moonlight Sax	Brian Smith	3
22 March 1992	Something Beginning with C	The Exponents	2
26 April 1992	Woodface	Crowded House	4
21 November 1993	Together Alone	Crowded House	1
17 July 1994	Traction	Supergroove	4
14 January 1996	Once Bitten, Twice Bitten: The Singles 1981–1995	The Exponents	1
14 July 1996	Recurring Dream: The Very Best of Crowded House	Crowded House	8
10 August 1997	Drive	Bic Runga	3
28 June 1998	Try Whistling This	Neil Finn	3
23 August 1998	The Islander	Dave Dobbyn	1
6 September 1998	Supersystem (Note: Supersystem was the highest ranked album by a New Zealand artist in both 1998 and 1999.)	The Feelers	1
13 September 1998	Espresso Guitar	Martin Winch	3
27 June 1999	Dream	TrueBliss	1
26 September 1999	Mix	Stellar	1
10 October 1999	The General Electric	Shihad	1
27 August 2000	Silencer	Zed	2
1 April 2001	One Nil	Neil Finn	1
20 May 2001	Hayley Westenra†	Hayley Westenra	4
26 August 2001	Inside the Dub Plates† (Note: While initially charting in 2001, Inside the Dub Plates was the highest ranked album by a New Zealand artist in 2002.)	Salmonella Dub	1
16 September 2001	Navigator	Che Fu	3
14 October 2001	Thinking Room	Anika Moa	2
28 October 2001	Communicate	The Feelers	1
4 November 2001	Magic Line	Stellar	1
27 January 2002	Listen: The Very Best Of	The Herbs	1
14 July 2002	Beautiful Collision‡	Bic Runga	8
1 September 2002	Pacifier	Pacifier	1
3 November 2002	The Datsuns	The Datsuns	1
10 November 2002	Blindspott	Blindspott	2
8 December 2002	Polysaturated	Nesian Mystik	1
20 July 2003	Love & Disrespect	Elemeno P	1
3 August 2003	Pure	Hayley Westenra	20
31 August 2003	One Drop East	Salmonella Dub	1
2 November 2003	The Crusader	Scribe	1
16 November 2003	What to Do with Daylight‡	Brooke Fraser	3
17 May 2004	Always and for Real	Adeaze	1
21 June 2004	One Road	Ben Lummis	2
2 August 2004	Riverhead	Goldenhorse	3
30 August 2004	Everyone Is Here	Finn Brothers	3
20 September 2004	Into the West	Yulia	4
9 May 2005	Based on a True Story‡ (Note: Based on a True Story was the highest ranked album by a New Zealand artist in both 2005 and the top ranked overall album in 2006.)	Fat Freddy's Drop	10
15 August 2005	Odyssey	Hayley Westenra	2
5 December 2005	Birds	Bic Runga	1
10 April 2006	Montage	Yulia	1
5 June 2006	End The Silence	Blindspott	1
24 July 2006	Into the Dojo	The Black Seeds	5
20 November 2006	One World	The Feelers	1
11 December 2006	Albertine	Brooke Fraser	1
26 March 2007	Treasure†	Hayley Westenra	5
4 June 2007	Long Player	Hollie Smith	2
22 October 2007	Kora	Kora	1
29 October 2007	Outrageous Fortune: Westside Rules	Various artists	1
6 January 2008	Second Hand Planet	Opshop	3
28 April 2008	Beautiful Machine	Shihad	1
5 May 2008	Flight of the Conchords	Flight of the Conchords	1
17 November 2008	The Best: 1998–2008	The Feelers	2
15 December 2008	The Comic Genius of Billy T. James‡	Billy T. James	6
1 June 2009	Dr Boondigga and the Big BW	Fat Freddy's Drop	5
24 August 2009	A Story	Fly My Pretties	1
19 October 2009	Ladyhawke: Collector's Edition	Ladyhawke	1
26 October 2009	Holy Smoke† (Note: Holy Smoke was the top ranked album by a New Zealand artist in both 2009 and 2010.)	Gin Wigmore	5
16 November 2009	The System Is a Vampire	Shapeshifter	2
22 March 2010	Humour and the Misfortune of Others	Hollie Smith	1
5 April 2010	The Experiment	Dane Rumble	1
9 August 2010	Until the End of Time	Opshop	1
30 August 2010	From the Inside Out	Stan Walker	1
13 September 2010	Passive Me, Aggressive You	The Naked and Famous	1
27 September 2010	Ignite	Shihad	1
18 October 2010	Flags	Brooke Fraser	1
21 February 2011	Island Vibration	House of Shem	1
14 March 2011	In the World of Light	Tiki	1
4 April 2011	Maori Songbook	Dennis Marsh	1
9 May 2011	Paradiso	Hayley Westenra	1
17 October 2011	Six60† (Note: Six60 was the top ranked album by a New Zealand artist in both 2011 and 2012.)	Six60	2
14 November 2011	Gravel & Wine	Gin Wigmore	2
16 April 2012	Dust and Dirt	The Black Seeds	1
7 May 2012	Home Brew	Home Brew	1
6 August 2012	White Rabbit: The Very Best of Peter Posa	Peter Posa	6
18 February 2013	Mt. Zion	Various Artists	1
10 June 2013	Delta	Shapeshifter	1
1 July 2013	Blackbird	Fat Freddy's Drop	4
5 August 2013	Country Songbook	Dennis Marsh	1
19 August 2013	Jackie Thomas	Jackie Thomas	2
23 September 2013	Blacklistt	Blacklistt	2
7 October 2013	Pure Heroine	Lorde	8
25 November 2013	Sol3 Mio‡ (Note: Sol3 Mio was the top ranked overall album in 2013 and the highest ranked album by a New Zealand artist in 2014.)	Sol3 Mio	9
21 July 2014	We Rise	Devilskin	3
18 August 2014	FVEY	Shihad	1
1 September 2014	Evergreen	Broods	1
9 March 2015	Six60	Six60	3
6 April 2015	Lest We Forget	Dennis Marsh	1
6 July 2015	Blood to Bone	Gin Wigmore	1
13 July 2015	The Quin Tikis: New Zealand's Premier Maori Show Band^{‡}	The Quin Tikis	2
2 November 2015	Bays	Fat Freddy's Drop	1
21 March 2016	On Another Note	Sol3 Mio	1
11 April 2016	Water or Gold	Hollie Smith	1
25 April 2016	Songs for Bubbas 2	Anika Moa	1
4 July 2016	Conscious	Broods	4
1 August 2016	Brown Girl	Aaradhna	1
7 November 2016	Meant to Be	The Koi Boys	1
14 November 2016	E Ipo: The Very Best Of	Prince Tui Teka	1
21 November 2016	Be Like the River	Devilskin	1
23 June 2017	Melodrama	Lorde	3
4 December 2017	A Very M3rry Christmas	Sol3 Mio	4
5 February 2018	"BBQ" Reggae	Tomorrow People	1
26 February 2018	Make Way for Love	Marlon Williams	1
8 July 2019	IV	Beastwars	1
18 November 2019	SIX60 (3)	SIX60	28
28 December 2020	L.A.B. IV	L.A.B.	5
29 August 2021	Solar Power	Lorde	1
11 March 2024	Dangerous Day To Be A Cold One	DARTZ	1
4 July 2025	Virgin	Lorde	1

== New Zealand albums with the most weeks at #1 ==
28 weeks

- SIX60 (3) - SIX60

20 weeks

- Pure - Hayley Westenra

10 weeks

- Based on a True Story - Fat Freddy's Drop

9 weeks

- Sol3 Mio - Sol3 Mio

8 weeks

- Pure Heroine - Lorde
- Recurring Dream: The Very Best of Crowded House - Crowded House
- Beautiful Collision - Bic Runga

6 weeks

- Time and Tide - Split Enz
- The Comic Genius of Billy T. James - Billy T. James
- White Rabbit: The Very Best of Peter Posa - Peter Posa

5 weeks

- Into the Dojo - The Black Seeds
- Treasure - Hayley Westenra
- Dr Boondigga and the Big BW - Fat Freddy's Drop
- Holy Smoke - Gin Wigmore
- L.A.B. IV - L.A.B.

== New Zealand artists with the most number-one albums ==
- Hayley Westenra (5)
- Split Enz (4)
- The Feelers (4)
- Lorde (4)
- Gin Wigmore (3)
- Bic Runga (3)
- Brooke Fraser (3)
- Crowded House (3)
- Fat Freddy's Drop (3)
- Shihad (3)
