= Pacifier (disambiguation) =

A pacifier is an artificial nipple given to an infant to suck upon.

Pacifier may also refer to:

- Pacifier (band), a short-lived name for the New Zealand band Shihad
  - "Pacifier", the 1999 song for which the band renamed themselves, found on The General Electric
  - Pacifier (Shihad album), by Shihad (as Pacifier), 2002
  - Pacifier Live, a double album released in 2003
- Pacifier (Nothingface album) or the title song, 1997
- "Pacifier" (song), by Catfish and the Bottlemen, 2014
- The Pacifier, a 2005 action comedy film starring Vin Diesel
- "The Pacifier" (The Simpsons short), a 1987 animated short
