= FVEY (album) =

2014 album by Shihad

Studio album by Shihad
- Released: 8 August 2014
- Recorded: York Street Studio, Auckland, New Zealand
- Genres: Alternative metal; hard rock
- Length: 52:34
- Labels: Roadrunner, Warner
- Producer: Jaz Coleman

Shihad chronology
Ignite (2010)	FVEY (2014)	Old Gods (2021)

Singles from FVEY
- 1. "Think You're So Free" Released: 27 June 2014

FVEY (pronounced Five Eyes) is the ninth studio album by New Zealand alternative rock band Shihad, released on 8 August 2014. The album debuted at number one on the New Zealand albums chart, making it Shihad's fifth New Zealand number one album. The chart position also makes Shihad the only New Zealand band to have five number one albums, tying them with solo artist Hayley Westenra who also has five number one albums.

The album name is a reference to "Five Eyes", often abbreviated as FVEY, an intelligence alliance comprising Australia, Canada, New Zealand, the United Kingdom and the United States.

== Background ==
For the production of their ninth studio album, Shihad worked with Jaz Coleman, of English post-punk band Killing Joke. Coleman produced Shihad's debut album, Churn, but a disagreement with the band occurred after the release of the album. Following a 15-year period in which Coleman and Shihad did not communicate, Coleman made amends with the band members at a London, UK awards ceremony. Toogood explained in June 2014:

Three years ago we were at the Metal Hammer awards. I hadn't talked to Jaz for ages. We'd had a falling out, I just didn't have time for him. Tom [Larkin] went and chatted to him and was like, "come over and talk to him". I was like, "Fuck that guy". But he was softer—he doesn't drink alcohol anymore. He's still gnarly and idealistic and brutal but minus the alcohol that makes him this focused machine. It was just the perfect meeting of what we wanted to do and having the right guy to do it with.

Toogood explained that the entirety of the ninth album was recorded live, while Coleman conducted, and the band members were forced to focus entirely on each song as they were recorded, without outside distractions, such as mobile phones.

FVEY was released on 8 August 2014 on the Warner Music New Zealand label. The first single, "Think You're So Free", was described by Australia's Double J radio station as sounding "more furious now than they ever have" and the music video for the song was published on YouTube on 5 July 2014. Prior to the release of the album, Toogood explained that anger towards social injustice was a primary motivation during the songwriting process, stating: "I don't have any answers but just as a concerned citizen, I'm going, 'This is bullshit'. The music's how we feel about that. It's fucking frustrating." Musically, the band chose a heavier sound, signifying a return to the first album, which the band found most enjoyable to play during their greatest hits tour.

== Reception ==
Professional ratings
Review scores
Source	Rating
Metro	8/10 stars
The Music	3/5 stars
The New Zealand Herald	5/5 stars
Renowned for Sound	3.5/5 stars
Rolling Stone	4/5 stars

FVEY received mostly positive reviews. Chris Schulz of The New Zealand Herald praised the intensity of the album, stating "They've just made the angriest album of their career - and it's a work of beauty."

== Track listing ==
All tracks are written by Shihad

FVEY track listing
No.	Title	Length
1.	"Think You're So Free"	4:07
2.	"FVEY"	5:31
3.	"The Big Lie"	5:18
4.	"Grey Area"	3:02
5.	"The Living Dead"	4:47
6.	"Song for No One"	3:54
7.	"The Great Divide"	6:38
8.	"Model Citizen"	3:33
9.	"Wasted In the West"	3:11
10.	"Loves Long Shadow"	4:50
11.	"Cheap As"	7:43
Total length:		52:34

Limited edition additional tracks
No.	Title	Length
12.	"The Reason Why"	5:44
13.	"Dark Secret"	4:53
14.	"All Right Here"	4:18
15.	"Funeral Dance"	6:09
Total length:		73:38

== Personnel ==
Shihad

- Jon Toogood – vocals, guitars
- Tom Larkin – drums
- Phil Knight – guitars
- Karl Kippenberger – bass guitar

Art and design

- Alt Group – artwork

Production and recording

- Evan Short – recording, engineering
- Scott Seabright – additional engineering
- Micha Livesay – additional engineering
- Forrester Savell - mixing, mastering
- Samuel K Sproull - vocal recording, mixing (tracks 12, 14, 15)
- Jaz Coleman – producer

== Charts ==
=== Weekly charts ===
Weekly chart performance for FVEY
Chart (2014)	Peak position
Australian Albums (ARIA)	9
New Zealand Albums (RMNZ)	1

=== Year-end charts ===
Year-end chart performance for FVEY
Chart (2014)	Position
New Zealand Albums (RMNZ)	29

== Certifications ==
Certifications for FVEY
Region	Certification	Certified units/sales
New Zealand (RMNZ)	Gold	7,500^{^}
^{^} Shipments figures based on certification alone.
