= Jaz Coleman =

English musician (born 1960)

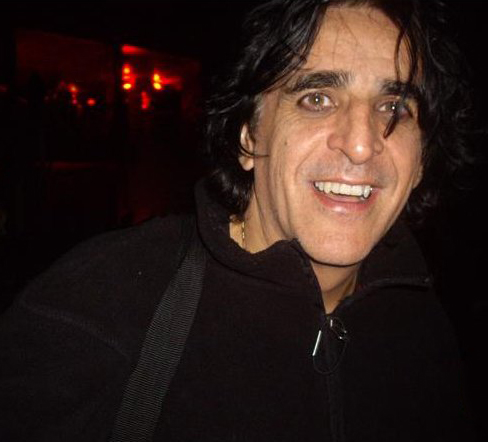
- Coleman in 2008

Background information
- Born: Jeremy Coleman; 26 February 1960 (age 66); Cheltenham, Gloucestershire, England
- Genres: Post-punk; industrial metal; classical music
- Occupations: Singer; musician; songwriter; composer; producer
- Instruments: Vocals; keyboards; synthesizer
- Years active: 1978–present
- Labels: Cooking Vinyl; Red Ink; Sony; Zoo/Volcano; E.G.; Virgin; Spinefarm
- Member of: Killing Joke
- Website: jazcoleman.com

Jeremy "Jaz" Coleman (born 26 February 1960) is an English singer and musician. He came to prominence in the early 1980s as the lead vocalist and keyboardist of post-punk group Killing Joke, of which he has been the only constant member. In addition, Coleman has composed orchestral and soundtrack pieces.

As Killing Joke's singer, Coleman is known for his raspy baritone voice and intense stage presence (occasionally appearing wearing face makeup). Bill Janovitz, a writer for the website AllMusic, described Coleman's stage presence and voice as "almost always full-on in his approach, with a terrifying growl of a voice that is similar to that of Motörhead's Lemmy". In the first part of their career, Coleman also played synth while singing, adding electronic atonal sounds to create a disturbing atmosphere to their music. He still continues to play keyboards and synths in studio recordings. James Hetfield picked Coleman as one of his favourite singers. In November 2010, the band received the "Innovator Award" at the 2010 Classic Rock Roll of Honour; the award was presented to Killing Joke by admirer and friend Jimmy Page of Led Zeppelin, who stated: "I go back a long way with Jaz Coleman and the band. I used to go and see the band, and it was a band that really impressed me."

He moved to New Zealand in the 1990s and became a citizen of that country in 1992.

== Early life ==
Coleman was born in Cheltenham, Gloucestershire, England, to Ronald A. and Gloria H. (née Pandy) Coleman: an English father and an Anglo-Indian mother of half-Bengali descent, both of whom were school teachers. He studied piano and violin under Eric Coleridge, head of music for Cheltenham College, until the age of 17, and was a member of several cathedral choirs in England.

Coleman studied in Leipzig, East Germany, in 1978, and Cairo Conservatoire in 1979, completing an extensive study of Arabic quarter tones at the latter institution. According to his own account, Coleman also studied international banking for three years in Switzerland and is an ordained priest with a church in New Zealand.

== Music career ==
=== Killing Joke ===
In 1978, Coleman founded Killing Joke with drummer Paul Ferguson in Notting Hill, England. The pair then recruited guitarist Geordie Walker and bassist Martin Glover (a.k.a. Youth). The group released their first single in October 1979 and their first eponymous album was released in 1980. Coleman told biographer Jyrki "Spider" Hämäläinen that forming the band felt "it was the destiny". Coleman contributed lead vocals and keyboards to the band's songs, which are categorised as post-punk, and the music later inspired the industrial rock and metal genres.

=== Solo composition and recordings ===
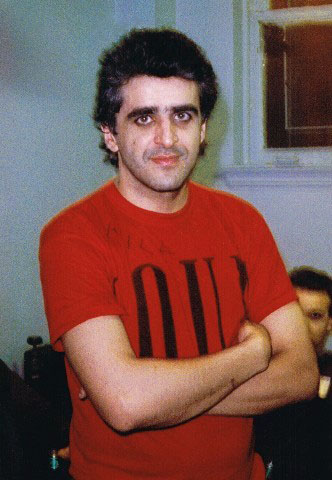
Coleman in 1991

Coleman travelled to Iceland and announced his intention to become a classical composer. Ten years of studying and ongoing Killing Joke involvement later, he commenced conducting and worked with some of the world's leading orchestras. Conductor Klaus Tennstedt described him as a "new Mahler".

In 1990, in collaboration with Anne Dudley and the French-Algerian-Jewish singer and talented guitarist Enrico Macias Coleman released his first purely instrumental album entitled Songs from the Victorious City, which is formally classified as "World Music", but is primarily composed of a mixture of middle eastern folk themes mixed with western pop-oriented themes. The album received media coverage including a report on BBC2's Rapido.

In 1995, Coleman released his first of three albums of symphonic rock music: Us and Them: Symphonic Pink Floyd, which peaked at number one in the Billboard Magazine Top Classical Crossover Albums chart, and Kashmir: Symphonic Led Zeppelin were both written and produced by Coleman with Peter Scholes conducting the London Philharmonic Orchestra. In June 2007, Coleman collaborated with over 150 youth musicians in the Contemporary Youth Orchestra, based in Cleveland, Ohio, to perform the entirety of Kashmir: Symphonic Led Zeppelin along with additional orchestrations of Led Zeppelin's music. In 1999, he produced and arranged an album of Doors material for orchestra, performed by classical musicians including Nigel Kennedy and the Prague Symphony Orchestra, called Riders on the Storm: The Doors Concerto (CD released in 2000). He has worked with the New Zealand Symphony Orchestra, who have issued a CD of his Symphony No. 1 "Idavoll" with the Auckland Philharmonia Orchestra, and as composer-in-residence to the Prague Symphony Orchestra.

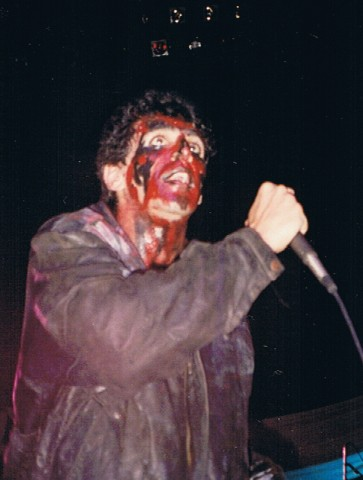
Coleman performing with Killing Joke in 1991

In 1996, he released Pacifica: Ambient Sketches, recorded with the New Zealand String Quartet.

In 1999, Coleman and Maori singer Hinewehi Mohi formed Oceania (with Hirini Melbourne and many others) which recorded the album Oceania. The record went double platinum in New Zealand. The song "Pukaea" appeared in the film Year of the Devil (2002). Oceania II appeared in 2002.

In 2001, Coleman was commissioned by the Royal Opera House in Covent Garden London for his first large scale opera entitled The Marriage at Cana.

Also commissioned by the Royal Opera House was Coleman's Unwanted, a concerto grosso for violin, viola and string orchestra whose theme portrays the plight of the Romany people of central Europe. This work was in collaboration with Czech photographer Jana Tržilová, whose portraits of the Roma taken within her own country moved the composer with their deep compassion and humanity.

On 22 March 2003, Coleman was commissioned by the Institute for Complex Adaptive Matter (ICAM) to compose a three-part concerto Music of the Quantum, expressing the ideas of the quantum and emergence in musical form, which he co-produced with his elder brother, Piers Coleman (born 13 February 1958), who is a condensed matter physicist at Rutgers University.

On 22 March, Sir Laurence Gardner's book Secrets of the Lost Ark, which expounds on anti-gravity and prehistory, was published. Coleman and Gardner publicly exchanged their work (book and scores) at the Occulture Lectures in Brighton on 20 July 2003, a gesture appropriate to Coleman's interest in themes of renaissance, collaboration, and working in parallels.

Also in 2003, Coleman completed a second work with Nigel Kennedy and the Kroke Trio in the role of friend and producer of their album, East Meets East, released through EMI Classics.

In 2004 and 2005, Coleman arranged the Sarah Brightman album Harem and wrote a further 12 Arias to be recorded with her. He also continues with his work as composer in residence of the Prague Symphony Orchestra. In early 2006 Joseph McManners performed Coleman's Daughter of England at the Royal Albert Hall with the Royal Philharmonic to standing ovation.

In 2009, Coleman recorded the Nirvana Suite with the Czech National Symphony Orchestra, and played summer festivals across Europe with Killing Joke. Coleman travelled from Japan to South India with former bandmate Paul Raven's ashes and participated in Pradakshina. In December, Coleman's Us and Them: Symphonic Pink Floyd was performed at the Berlin Konzerthaus for the 20th anniversary of the fall of the Wall.

In 2010, Coleman completed his Magna Suscitatio for solo violin, chorus and full orchestra, which illustrates the process of transformation and illumination of the human condition "from our current barbaric state". Coleman also began work with the Prague Chamber Orchestra and was in discussion about a series of concerts. Coleman's second symphony, recorded by the Auckland Philharmonic Orchestra, was due for release with the Nirvana Suite.

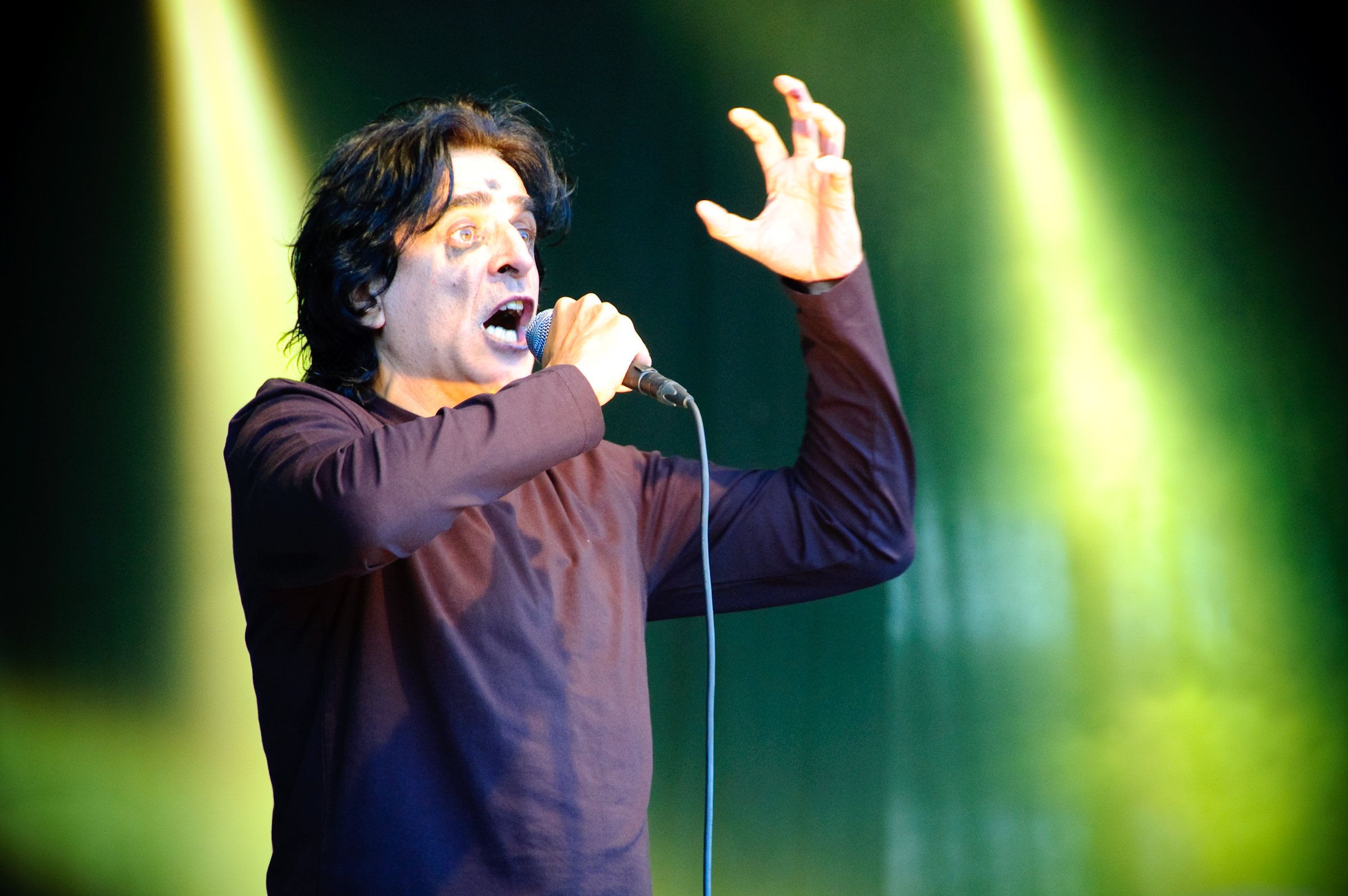
Coleman performing at the 2009 Ilosaarirock festival

In 2014, Coleman began the year by conducting the NSO Symphony Orchestra (UAE) for the opening ceremony of the Dubai World Cup, which was broadcast to 160 countries. Later that year, Coleman recorded with the Moscow State Film Orchestra and performed his Zep Symphony some 30 kilometres outside St. Petersburg at Gatchina Palace for the White Night gala with the Minsk Philharmonic. One month later, Coleman recorded The Nirvana Dialogues with the St. Petersburg State Symphony Orchestra for Universal records. Due to the success of this recording, Coleman has entered into a two-year contract as composer-in-residence with the St. Petersburg State Symphony Orchestra. Also in 2014, Us and Them: Symphonic Pink Floyd was performed by the Melbourne Ballet Orchestra on 22 October and 1 November.

2015 saw the release of Tambours du Bronx's album Corros, featuring a collaboration with Coleman on the track "Human Smile".

On 28 February 2016, Coleman gave a spoken word performance in Auckland, titled "'Going Over to the Dark Side', A light hearted look at the state of world affairs by the Dark Lord". Later in the year, his Doors Concerto was performed at the White Nights Festival in Saint Petersburg, Russia.

2016 also saw the release of the Levee Walkers, a collaboration between Coleman, Duff McKagan and Pearl Jam guitarist Mike McCready. McKagan stipulated who and what a Levee Walker is: "To become a Levee Walker you must have at least 25 years of musical experience, survived battles with the forces of darkness, and perhaps even kissed death on the cheek. More importantly, there must exist a deep reverence for the music of your comrades, and the commitment they made to this hardest of paths."

In September 2016, Coleman was invited by the Étrange festival in Paris for a "carte blanche" programme of six films and a spoken word performance.

In 2019, Coleman collaborated with the industrial duo from Rome Deflore for the EP Party In The Chaos.

== Other work ==
=== Films and soundtracks ===
In 2002, Coleman starred (as himself) in a Czech film by Petr Zelenka, Rok ďábla (Year of the Devil). The film was awarded the Crystal Globe at the Karlovy Vary International Film Festival. He also co-produced a documentary-style music film with Filmmaker Shaun Pettigrew called "The Death And Resurrection Show", named after a song on Killing Joke's 2003 album. The film was premiered at the British Film Institute on 19 February 2015.

=== Production ===
Together with Martin Williams and Malcolm Welsford, Coleman founded the York Street Studio in New Zealand. The studio was closed after Coleman produced the ninth album of New Zealand band Shihad, FVEY, which was released in the second half of 2014.

Coleman produced Shihad's debut album, Churn—also recorded at York Street—but a disagreement with the band occurred after the release of the album. Following a 15-year period in which Coleman and Shihad did not communicate, Coleman made amends with the band members at a London, UK awards ceremony. Shihad's lead singer and guitarist Jon Toogood explained in June 2014:

We'd had a falling out, I just didn't have time for him [Coleman] ... I was like, "Fuck that guy". But he was softer—he doesn't drink alcohol anymore. He's still gnarly and idealistic and brutal but minus the alcohol that makes him this focused machine. It was just the perfect meeting of what we wanted to do and having the right guy to do it with.

Prior to the recording of FVEY, Coleman informed the band, "I'm going to work you until you've made a great record" and, after the completion of a two-month recording period, Toogood referred to the band's time with Coleman as a "bootcamp"; however, Toogood further explained that the band "needed someone to crack the whip" and he felt "purged" afterward.

=== Books ===
In 2006, Coleman wrote a book about permaculture, free energy, freedom and freedom-loving individuals. Titled Letters from Cythera, it was released in early 2014 and was described by Coleman as an overview of "how the occult sciences have shaped my philosophical outlook expounding on my preferred system for a personalized renaissance (the supersynthesis)"—Coleman stated that the book was written between 2007 and 2008. When asked to expound upon his "supersynthesis" concept, Coleman explained:

[Supersynthesis is] the idea that we can stretch ourselves in 12 different directions all at once, and I put myself out as a guinea-pig and put myself through the paces and I’m in the process of sharing my results with people, to show how far I got. The thing about the super-synthesis is you choose one opus magnum, a huge work to do, then you chose 12 other non related projects that you’re meant to take to mastery and so I’ve finished pretty much everything and now is the execution of all of these – some of which I’ve done …

In the wake of the book's publishing, Coleman did a spoken word performance at London's St Pancras Old Church on 17 June 2015.

== Awards and accolades ==
In 2001, Coleman recorded the multi-platinum album Proměny with Czech band Čechomor, which won three Anděl (Angel) awards.

Coleman was made Chevalier des Arts et des Lettres by the French Minister of Culture for his contribution to contemporary music, and was decorated by the French government on 27 September 2010, while Killing Joke were in concert at the Bataclan theatre in Paris.

On 24 November 2021, Coleman’s contribution to both contemporary and classical music was recognised by the University of Gloucestershire by awarding him an Honorary Doctorate of Music.

== Personal life ==
Coleman is a supporter of the concept of environmental sustainability and has invested in the creation of two ecovillages in the South Pacific and in Chile.

Coleman does not support any particular political party and is politically non-partisan.

When asked about his perspective on the United States in a May 2013 interview, Coleman explained:

It's different from 30 years ago. There's no rebellion left. Everyone is just a passive zombie. Food supply has something to do with it – it's dumbed down everyone to obese, lethargic corpses ... People are worn down ... It's a fragmented society. People have access now to amazing amounts of information, but their attention spans are getting shorter, their focus is gone. Instant gratification. Instant knowledge orgasm! I think that a lot of the great thinkers couldn't achieve what they did through a computer.
