= Devolve (EP) =

EP by Shihad
- Released: 1990 (Vinyl) 1991 (CD) (Cassette)
- Recorded: May 1990
- Genre: Thrash metal
- Length: 22:04
- Label: Pagan Records
- Producer: Malcolm Welsford & Shihad

The Devolve EP is the 1990 debut release by New Zealand rock band Shihad and was co-produced by the group with Malcolm Welsford. The EP was originally released in 1990 on a limited run of 1000 vinyl copies, and re-released in the following year on CD. It reached the top 20 on the New Zealand albums chart.

Devolve received critical acclaim and while being the band's first EP, they were one of the most talked about bands in New Zealand, and had already opened for such other metal acts, Faith No More and Anthrax.

The line-up of Shihad (then typeset as Shihäd) included Hamish Laing on bass guitar, along with mainstays Jon Toogood on lead vocals and rhythm guitar, Phil Knight on lead guitar and Tom Larkin on drums. The EP is Laing's last recording for Shihad, he was replaced by Karl Kippenberger on bass guitar in 1991.

The track "Down Dance" had been released as a B-side on the New Zealand version of Australian band, the Angels' first single, "Dogs Are Talking" (1990), from their Beyond Salvation (June 1990) album. Also included on that split single was Auckland band Nine Livez, with both New Zealand bands supporting the Angels on their NZ tour in 1990.

The track "The Wizard" is a cover of the Black Sabbath song "The Wizard" that was on the self-titled Black Sabbath album.

== Track listing ==
1. "It"
2. "Down Dance"
3. "Subject Matters"
4. "The Wizard" (Black Sabbath Cover)
