= Last of the Lonely Gods =

Studio album by Jon Toogood
- Released: October 2024

Last of the Lonely Gods is the first solo album by Shihad guitarist and singer Jon Toogood. Released in October 2024 it peaked at No. 9 in New Zealand's albums chart, and at No. 2 on the chart of albums by New Zealand artists.

Played on acoustic guitar, the songs were inspired by years of what Toogood called "personal carnage". This included a 2021 COVID-19 lockdown in Melbourne preventing him from seeing his mother before she died, a later lockdown in Wellington stranding him away from his wife and children while he lived with his sister and dying brother-in-law, and then a COVID infection leaving him with severe tinnitus that prevented him from sleeping and led to panic attacks.

The album's songwriting began after a cognitive behavioural therapist suggested that Toogood play guitar as a mindfulness exercise, which helped alleviate his tinnitus symptoms and anxiety.

== Track listing ==
1. Lost in My Hometown
2. Shouldn't Leave it Like That
3. Last of the Lonely Gods
4. Gravity
5. Love is Forever
6. Us Against the World
7. Swallow Song
8. The Best You Can
9. Maybe It Was Your Heart
10. Missing Paradise
