= Old Gods =

Studio album by Shihad
- Released: 8 October 2021
- Genre: Alternative metal
- Length: 38:27
- Label: ADA, Warner
- Producer: Adam Spark

Shihad chronology
FVEY (2014)	Old Gods (2021)

Singles from Old Gods
- 1. "Tear Down Those Names" Released: 8 July 2021; 2. "Little Demons" Released: 30 July 2021; 3. "Feel the Fire" Released: 24 August 2021; 4. "Empire Falling" Released: 7 October 2021

Old Gods is the tenth and final studio album by New Zealand rock band Shihad, released on 8 October 2021. The album debuted at number one in New Zealand.

== Production ==
Much of the album was inspired by Jon Toogood's experiences after his conversion to Islam, before his marriage to Dana Salih in Sudan in 2014, and the band's disgust at the rise of Conservative politicians in the world. The song "Little Demons" was one of the first songs written for the album, inspired by a televised Australian political debate where a Liberal Party of Australia told an Aboriginal Australian woman to call the police when she experiences racist threats.

== Release and promotion ==
The album was announced on 8 July 2021, at the same time when the first single from Old Gods was released, "Tear Down Those Names". This was followed by "Little Demons" on 30 July, "Feel the Fire" in August and "Empire Falling" on 7 October.

The album was originally slated for release on 27 August, however the album was postponed due to the 2021 COVID-19 lockdowns in New Zealand, eventually released on 8 October.

The album debuted at number one in New Zealand, scoring the band the record for New Zealand band with the most number one albums in history.

The band intended to tour the album in Australia with a seven-date tour in October, and a planned five date tour of New Zealand in November, however both were cancelled due to COVID-19 restrictions in the countries. Shihad held their This Is the Sound of an Empire Falling tour in New Zealand, performing four dates in September and October 2022.

== Track listing ==
All tracks are written by Jon Toogood, Karl Kippenberger, Phil Knight and Tom Larkin.

Old Gods track listing
No.	Title	Length
1.	"Tear Down Those Names"	4:01
2.	"Old Gods"	3:19
3.	"Mink Coat"	4:04
4.	"The Hill Song"	3:54
5.	"Feel the Fire"	4:07
6.	"Little Demons"	4:01
7.	"Empire Falling"	3:37
8.	"Just Like You"	4:17
9.	"Slow Dawning"	3:47
10.	"The Wreckage"	3:09
Total length:		38:27

== Credits and personnel ==
Shihad

- Jon Toogood – guitar, songwriting
- Karl Kippenberger – bass, songwriting
- Phil Knight – guitar, songwriting
- Tom Larkin – drums, songwriting

Production and recording

- Adam Spark – mixing, producer
- Tom Baker – mastering

== Charts ==
=== Weekly charts ===
Weekly chart performance for Old Gods
Chart (2021)	Peak position
Australian Albums (ARIA)	15
New Zealand Albums (RMNZ)	1

=== Year-end charts ===
Year-end chart performance for Old Gods
Chart (2021)	Position
New Zealand Artist Albums (RMNZ)	19
