= General Electric (disambiguation) =

General Electric is an American multinational conglomerate.

General Electric may also refer to:

- General Electric Company, a former UK consumer and defence electronics company
- Portland General Electric, a public utility in Oregon, U.S.
- The General Electric, a 1999 album by Shihad
