= I Only Said =

I Only Said may refer to:

- "I Only Said", Shihad's first single from their 1993 debut album Churn (Shihad album)
- "I Only Said", a song by My Bloody Valentine from their 1991 album Loveless (album)
