= Outrageous Fortune discography =

The following is a list of soundtracks that have been released for the New Zealand television comedy/drama series Outrageous Fortune.

== Soundtracks ==
=== Music from Outrageous Fortune – Westside Rules ===
Music from Outrageous Fortune – Westside Rules

Soundtrack album by various artists
- Released: 24 October 2007
- Genre: Rock
- Label: Mana
- Producer: Chris Gough; Jonathan Hughes

Outrageous Fortune soundtrack chronology
Music from Outrageous Fortune – Westside Rules (2007)	Repeat Offenders (2008)

Music from Outrageous Fortune – Westside Rules is the first soundtrack album for the New Zealand comedy-drama television series, Outrageous Fortune, and draws on New Zealand music. It was released on 24 October 2007, and debut at number 1 in its first week of release. The album leads off with the series' theme song Hello Sailor's "Gutter Black".

==== Track listing ====
No.	Title	Writer(s)	Artist	Length
1.	"Gutter Black"	Dave McArtney	Hello Sailor
2.	"Buck It Up"		Goodshirt
3.	"Beers"		Deja Voodoo
4.	"All Aboard"		The Datsuns
5.	"Be Mine Tonight"	Ian Morris/Dave Dobbyn	Th' Dudes
6.	"Feel So Good"	Julian Hanson	The Spelling Mistakes
7.	"B Your Boy"	Buzz Moller	Voom
8.	"Run Run Run"	Kirsten Reade	Goldenhorse
9.	"I'll Say Goodbye"	Jordan Luck	Dance Exponents
10.	"Won't Give In"	Neil Finn/Tim Finn	Finn Brothers
11.	"No Ordinary Thing"		Opshop
12.	"Beach in Cali High"	Jolyon Mulholland	Gasoline Cowboy
13.	"80's Celebration"	James Milne	The Reduction Agents
14.	"Lock and Load"	Paseload	Paseload
15.	"Jesus for the Jugular"	Finn Andrews	The Veils
16.	"Mine"	Shayne Carter	Dimmer
17.	"Let's Get Down"		The Black Seeds
18.	"God Left Town"	Andrew Thorne	Calico Brothers
19.	"Save Yourself"	Greg Johnson	Greg Johnson
20.	"All for You"		Goodnight Nurse
21.	"Titirangi Thugs"	Dogs of War	Dogs of War

=== Repeat Offenders ===
Repeat Offenders

Soundtrack album by various artists
- Released: 3 October 2008
- Genre: Soundtrack
- Label: Warner Music NZ

Outrageous Fortune Soundtrack chronology
Westside Rules (2007)	Repeat Offenders (2008)

Repeat Offenders is the second compilation soundtrack album for the show, and again draws on New Zealand music for its track listing. It was released on 3 October 2008, and entered the New Zealand charts at #32, rising to #7 in its second week.

==== Track listing ====
1. Shihad - "Home Again"
2. The Roulettes - "You Want It"
3. Splitter - "I Don't Rate Your Man"
4. Shaft - "Dinah"
5. Hello Sailor - "Blue Lady"
6. Kora - "Time"
7. The Rock and Roll Machine - "Want U Bad"
8. The Tutts - "K"
9. Cut Off Your Hands - "Oh Girl"
10. The Black Seeds - "Sometimes Enough"
11. dDub - "Hesitate No"
12. Dimmer - "One Breath At A Time"
13. Dead Flowers - "Might As Well Get Used To It"
14. The Veils - "Under The Folding Branches"
15. The Brunettes -" End Of The Runway"
16. Fur Patrol - "Long Distance Runner"
17. Samuel F. Scott & The B.O.P - "Llwellyn"
18. Goodshirt - "Dumb Day"
19. Atlas - "Firefly"
20. Graham Brazier - "East Of Eden"

== Album charts ==
Year	Album	Chart	Position
2007	Westside Rules	RIANZ Albums Chart	1
2008	Repeat Offenders	RIANZ Albums Chart	6
