= Tom Larkin (diplomat) =

New Zealand diplomat and public servant (1917–2021)

Tom Larkin ONZM

Ambassador of New Zealand to Japan
- In office 1972–1976
- Preceded by: Hunter Wade
- Succeeded by: Rod Miller

Personal details
- Born: Thomas Cedric Larkin; 17 November 1917 Wellington, New Zealand
- Died: 17 August 2021 (aged 103) Wellington, New Zealand
- Spouse: Sarah Marianne Williams (m. 1970; died 2018)
- Relatives: Tom Larkin (son)
- Education: New Plymouth Boys' High School
- Alma mater: Victoria University College

Thomas Cedric Larkin ONZM (17 November 1917 – 17 August 2021) was a New Zealand public servant and diplomat, serving as New Zealand ambassador to Japan between 1972 and 1976. He also played representative cricket for Taranaki in the 1930s.

== Early life and family ==
Born in Wellington on 17 November 1917, Larkin was the son of Herbert James Larkin and Irene Mary O'Connor. He was educated at New Plymouth Boys' High School, and went on to study at Victoria University College, graduating Master of Arts with second-class honours in 1940. While at Victoria, Larkin represented the university at rugby union.

Between 1941 and 1945, Larkin served in the Royal New Zealand Naval Volunteer Reserve.

On 28 November 1970, Larkin married Sarah Marianne Williams. Their three children include the musician Tom Larkin.

== Cricket ==
A left-hand batsman and right-arm medium-pace bowler, Larkin played Hawke Cup cricket for Taranaki between 1934 and 1939. While playing for the New Plymouth Boys' High School 1st XI in 1936, Larkin and Martin Donnelly shared a record partnership of 234 that stood until 1965.

As an 18-year-old, Larkin played for Taranaki in their two-day match against the touring MCC team, scoring six and four runs, respectively, in his two innings, and bowling two overs without success. In 1946, he represented Wellington, but did not appear in any first-class matches. He also played for the New Zealand Universities team while he was a student at Victoria University College, and was awarded a cricket blue.

== Career ==
Larkin joined the Department of External Affairs in 1946. In 1953, he served as official secretary at the New Zealand High Commission in Canberra, and was the New Zealand ambassador to Japan from 1972 to 1976. The remainder of his career was spent based in Wellington. He was a New Zealand delegate to the United Nations General Assembly in 1948–1949, 1952, 1956–1958, and 1968, and attended the Suez Canal Conference in 1956.

Particularly interested in Asian and Japanese affairs, Larkin wrote books on the subject, including New Zealand and Japan in the post-war world, published in 1969, and Japan today (1983).

== Later life and death ==
In the 2008 Queen's Birthday Honours, Larkin was appointed an Officer of the New Zealand Order of Merit, for services to New Zealand–Japan relations. He was also awarded the Grand Cordon of the Order of the Rising Sun.

Larkin was predeceased by his wife, Sarah, in 2018. He died in Wellington on 17 August 2021, aged 103.
