= Shihad (album) =

Studio album by Shihad
- Released: September 1996
- Recorded: York Street Studios, Auckland, June 1996 - July 1996
- Genre: Alternative rock
- Length: 44:50
- Label: Wildside Records
- Producer: Shihad & Malcolm Welsford

Shihad chronology
Killjoy (1995)	Shihad (1996)	The General Electric (1999)

Professional ratings
Review scores
Source	Rating
Allmusic	4/5 stars

Shihad is the third studio album released by New Zealand rock band, Shihad.

Released in New Zealand in September 1996 on the Wildside Records label, it is sometimes known as "the fish album" - a reference to the fish that feature in the album's artwork.

The album was dedicated to the memory of the band's manager and friend, Gerald Dwyer, who had died earlier that year.

The album was recorded at York Street Studios, Auckland, New Zealand and produced & engineered by Malcolm Welsford. Tracks include the singles "La La Land", "A Day Away", "Home Again" and "Yr Head Is A Rock". "It's A Go" was released as a single in Europe and "Ghost From The Past" as a single in Australia. "Home Again" went on to be one of New Zealand's biggest hits of all time.

== Track listing ==
1. "Home Again" - 3:35
2. "Ghost From The Past" - 2:58
3. "Hate Boys" - 4:09
4. "It's A Go" - 3:31
5. "La La Land" - 2:30
6. "Attack" - 3:08
7. "Pig Bop" - 5:05
8. "Leo Song" - 3:29
9. "A Day Away" - 2:27
10. "Yr' Head Is A Rock" - 3:53
11. "Missionary" - 1:43
12. "Outta Phase" - 3:29
13. "Boat Song" - 4:53

== Credits ==
- All songs by: Shihad
- Produced by: Shihad & Malcolm Welsford
- Assistant Engineer: Aron Ross
- Mixed by: Malcolm Welsford except 1 - 4, and 9 mixed by Adam Kaspar
- Mastered by: Dave Collins

== Certifications ==
Region	Certification	Certified units/sales
New Zealand (RMNZ)	Platinum	15,000^{^}
^{^} Shipments figures based on certification alone.
