= List of ambassadors of New Zealand to Japan =

The Ambassador from New Zealand to Japan is New Zealand's foremost diplomatic representative in Japan, and in charge of New Zealand's diplomatic mission in Japan.

The embassy is located in Tokyo, Japan's capital city. New Zealand has maintained a resident ambassador in Japan since 1958, and a resident Head of Mission since 1947.

== List of heads of mission ==
=== Government Trade Representatives in Japan ===
- Bill Challis (1947–1952)

=== Chargés d'Affaires in Japan ===
- Bill Challis (1952–1956)

=== Minister in Japan ===
- John S. Reid (1956–1958)

=== Ambassadors to Japan ===
- John S. Reid (1958–1961)
- Ted Taylor (1961–1965)
- John Scott (1965–1969)
- Hunter Wade (1969–1972)
- Tom Larkin (1972–1976)
- Rod Miller (1976–1983)
- Graham Ansell (1983–1984)
- Roger Peren (1984–1987)
- Richard Nottage (1987–1988)
- Rod Gates (1988–1992)
- David McDowell (1992–1994)
- Maarten Wevers (1994–1998)
- Neil Walter (1998–1999)
- Phillip Gibson (1999–2005)
- John A. McArthur (2005–2007)
- Ian Kennedy (2007–2012)
- Mark Sinclair (2012–2016)
- Stephen Payton (2016–2019)
- Hamish Cooper (2019–present)
