= Ignite (Shihad album) =

Studio album by Shihad
- Released: 20 September 2010
- Studios: The Studio in the City, Melbourne, Australia
- Genres: Alternative metal; electronic rock
- Length: 44:53
- Labels: Roadrunner, Warner
- Producer: Shihad

Shihad chronology
Beautiful Machine (2008)	Ignite (2010)	FVEY (2014)

Singles from Ignite
- 1. "Sleepeater" Released: 2010; 2. "Lead or Follow" Released: 2010; 3. "Ignite" Released: 2010; 4. "Engage" Released: 2011

Ignite is the eighth studio album by Shihad and was released on 20 September 2010 in New Zealand and 24 September 2010 in Australia. Ignite debuted at number one on the New Zealand Music Chart, eventually achieving gold sales there.

The cover features the Maunsell sea forts that were built in the Thames and Mersey estuaries during the Second World War to help defend the United Kingdom.

== Recording ==
The band started working on Ignite soon after the release of Beautiful Machine (2008). Like the previous album, they used drummer Tom Larkin's studio in Melbourne and acted as their own producers. Singer Jon Toogood had already begun working on what would become the first album by The Adults, and found the Ignite sessions meandering and boring by comparison.

== Critical reception ==
Scott Kara from The New Zealand Herald gave Ignite four out of five stars, praising Shihad's heavy and potent music. The Dominion Post's Lindsay Davis lauded its "raw, dirtier sound" rating the album three-and-a-half out of five stars. Nick Ward of The Nelson Mail gave it four out of five stars, commending the maturity and versatility of the band.

Jon Toogood calls Ignite his least favourite Shihad album.

== Commercial performance ==
Ignite debuted on the New Zealand Albums Chart at number one on 27 September 2010, which made Shihad the first New Zealand band to have four albums debut at number one. The album also appeared on the Australian Albums Chart at number forty-four on 10 October 2010.

Lead single "Sleepeater" is featured in Konami's Pro Evolution Soccer 2011 video game.

== Track listing ==
No.	Title	Length
1.	"The Final Year of the Universe"	6:05
2.	"Lead or Follow"	4:38
3.	"I'm a Void"	3:14
4.	"In the Future"	4:44
5.	"Sleepeater"	4:02
6.	"Ignite"	4:40
7.	"Engage"	4:27
8.	"This Lonely Fire"	5:01
9.	"Nemesis (Dark Star)"	3:30
10.	"Cold Heart"	4:27
Total length:		44:53

Limited Edition
No.	Title	Length
11.	"Beatlab"	5:22
12.	"Lead or Follow" (The Naked and Famous Remix)	3:09
13.	"Sleepeater" (Optimus Gryme remix)	4:29
14.	"This Lonely Fire" (Killjoy House Remix)	5:14
15.	"Sleepeater" (Concord Dawn remix)	5:55
Total length:		68:59

iTunes Store Deluxe Edition bonus tracks
No.	Title	Length
11.	"Beatlab"	5:22
12.	"Lead or Follow" (The Naked and Famous Remix)	3:09
13.	"Sleepeater" (Optimus Gryme remix)	4:29
14.	"This Lonely Fire" (Killjoy House Remix)	5:14
15.	"Sleepeater" (Concord Dawn remix)	5:55
16.	"Sleepeater" (Video)
17.	"Lead or Follow" (Video)
18.	"Sleepeater" (Video performance cut)

== Certifications ==
Region	Certification	Certified units/sales
New Zealand (RMNZ)	Gold	7,500^{^}
^{^} Shipments figures based on certification alone.
