= Killjoy (Shihad album) =

Studio album by Shihad
- Released: May 1995
- Recorded: July 1994
- Genre: Alternative metal; alternative rock; industrial rock; grunge
- Length: 41:47
- Label: Wildside Records
- Producer: Shihad & Malcolm Welsford

Shihad chronology
Churn (1993)	Killjoy (1995)	Shihad (1996)

Professional ratings
Review scores
Source	Rating
Allmusic	4.5/5 stars

Killjoy is the second full-length album released by New Zealand rock band Shihad. This album was released in May 1995.

It is their first album to go gold in New Zealand and has since gone platinum in said country. It is widely regarded as a classic New Zealand rock album.

According to MTV, Iggy Pop and the members of metal band Metallica have both highly praised this album.

== Track listing ==
All tracks written by Shihad.

Original release
No.	Title	Length
1.	"You Again"	4:39
2.	"Gimme Gimme"	5:17
3.	"The Call"	5:13
4.	"Envy"	3:55
5.	"Debs Night Out"	3:38
6.	"Bitter"	4:15
7.	"For What You Burn"	5:44
8.	"Silvercup"	5:04
9.	"Get Up"	4:10
Total length:		41:55

20th anniversary remaster
No.	Title	Length
10.	"N.I.L."	4:48
Total length:		46:35

== Credits ==
- All songs by: Shihad
- Produced by: Shihad & Malcolm Welsford
- Assistant Engineer: Nick Treacy
- Recorded and Mixed by: Malcolm Welsford
- Digital Editing: Evan Robertson
- Additional Percussion: DLT

== Awards ==
The album won Best Album at the 1996 New Zealand Music Awards.

== Certifications ==
Region	Certification	Certified units/sales
New Zealand (RMNZ)	Platinum	15,000^{^}
^{^} Shipments figures based on certification alone.
