= Love Is the New Hate =

2005 studio album by Shihad

Studio album by Shihad
- Released: 2 May 2005
- Recorded: 2004
- Studio: Armoury Studios, Vancouver, British Columbia, Canada; Birdland Studios Melbourne, Australia
- Genre: Alternative metal; hard rock; punk rock
- Length: 39:00
- Label: WEA
- Producer: GGGarth; Shihad

Shihad chronology
Pacifier (2002)	Love Is the New Hate (2005)	Beautiful Machine (2008)

Alternative covers
- Love Is the New Hate Limited Edition Live CD/DVD

Love Is the New Hate is the sixth studio album by the rock group Shihad. It was released on 2 May 2005, and yielded the singles "Alive", "All the Young Fascists", "Shot in the Head", "Dark Times" and "None of the Above".

The album is a return to Shihad's earlier heavier style, after an ill-fated attempt to make it big in the United States. The lyrics themselves are notably darker because of this - and are far more politically oriented than their earlier material, following their experiences touring the US under the Bush administration.

The album entered the New Zealand music charts at number two, going Gold in its first week of release - and then Platinum two weeks later. It peaked at No. 11 on the ARIA Albums Chart.

On 8 May 2006, the band released a Limited Edition copy of Love is the New Hate which came with a DVD of their 1 May 2005 performance in Aotea Square.

== Track listing ==
1. "None of the Above" – 2:22
2. "Empty Shell" – 3:27
3. "Day Will Come" – 3:11
4. "All the Young Fascists" – 3:10
5. "Saddest Song in the World" – 4:11
6. "Big Future" – 2:04
7. "Shot in the Head" – 3:20
8. "Dark Times" – 4:02
9. "Traitor" – 2:54
10. "Stop" – 2:49
11. "Alive" – 4:03
12. "Guts and the Glory" – 3:28
13. "Groupies" - 1:43

== DVD listing ==
1. "Empty Shell"
2. "Comfort Me"
3. "My Mind's Sedate"
4. "All the Young Fascists"
5. "Pacifier"
6. "Day will Come"
7. "None of the Above"
8. "The General Electric"
9. "Dark Times"
10. "Home Again"
11. "You Again"
12. "Alive"

== Credits ==
- GGGarth - producer
- Lindsay Gravina - mixing
- Howie Weinberg - mastering

== Certifications ==
Region	Certification	Certified units/sales
New Zealand (RMNZ)	Platinum	15,000^{^}
^{^} Shipments figures based on certification alone.
