= Beautiful Machine =

Studio album by Shihad
- Released: (New Zealand) 21 April 2008
- Recorded: Sing Sing Studios, Melbourne
- Genre: Alternative rock; electronic rock; post-punk revival
- Label: Warner Music
- Producer: Alan Moulder, Shihad, Scott Horscroft

Shihad chronology
Love Is the New Hate (2005)	Beautiful Machine (2008)	Ignite (2010)

Alternative covers
- Beautiful Machine 2 CD cover

Alternative cover
- Beautiful Machine pre-release artwork

Singles from Beautiful Machine
- 1. "One Will Hear the Other" Released: January 2008; 2. "Vampires" Released: March 2008; 3. "Beautiful Machine" Released: June 2008; 4. "Rule the World" Released: November 2008

Beautiful Machine is the seventh studio album by Shihad and was released on 21 April 2008 in New Zealand and 17 May 2008 in Australia.

The album is much softer than previous Shihad releases, including many electronica elements and '80s backing rhythms - to the point where lead singer Jon Toogood has called some tracks "dance songs".

The lead single "One Will Hear the Other" was released early January 2008, where it peaked as the second most played Kiwi song. "Vampires" was the album's second single and surpassed "One Will Hear the Other" in airplay, peaking as the number one most played Kiwi song shortly after its release.

Beautiful Machine entered the New Zealand Music Chart at number 1, going Gold on its first day of release (7,500+ sales). Despite this achievement it failed to go Platinum, Shihad's first album to not do so in 12 years.

Like Shihad's previous album Love Is the New Hate, Beautiful Machine's top position on the Australian ARIA Albums Chart was 11.

== Track listing ==
No.	Title	Length
1.	"One Will Hear The Other"	4:01
2.	"Rule The World"	4:22
3.	"Hard To Please"	3:59
4.	"Beautiful Machine"	4:14
5.	"Vampires"	4:04
6.	"Count It Up"	2:22
7.	"Waiting Around For God"	5:13
8.	"Chameleon"	3:37
9.	"Eliza"	4:39
10.	"The Bible And The Gun"	4:22
11.	"When You Coming Home?"	3:44
12.	"The Prophet"	5:14
Total length:		51:56

2 CD Bonus Disk Tracks
No.	Title	Length
1.	"Lowlife"	3:15
2.	"Won't Let You Down"	4:09
3.	"Skank" (Played live 2007)	3:50
4.	"It's a Crime"	4:39
5.	"Lightbulb"	2:49
6.	"Name Your Price"	4:22
Total length:		23:24

iTunes Only Bonus Tracks
No.	Title	Length
1.	"Violence+Bloodshed"
2.	"Easy Life Romance"
3.	"No Religion (Getting Nowhere Fast)"

Unreleased B-Sides
No.	Title	Length
1.	"Settle Down"
2.	"Michaelangelo"
3.	"Alazama"
4.	"Outta Here" (Played live 2006)
5.	"Whatever" (Played live 2006)

== Certifications ==
Region	Certification	Certified units/sales
New Zealand (RMNZ)	Gold	7,500^{^}
^{^} Shipments figures based on certification alone.
