= Institute for Complex Adaptive Matter =

International multicampus collective of scientists

The Institute for Complex Adaptive Matter (ICAM) is an international multicampus collective of scientists studying emergent phenomena in biology, chemistry and physics and in wider context. ICAM was founded in December 1998 at the Los Alamos National Laboratory with support from the University of California by experimental condensed matter physicist Zack Fisk and theoretical physicist David Pines, receiving support from the University of California Office of the Present, ICAM member branches all over the world, the US National Science Foundation between 2003 and 2013, and the Gordon and Betty Moore Foundation for QuantEmX Fellows from 2015 onwards.
