= Pacifier Live =

Live album by Shihad (as Pacifier)
- Released: 23 November 2003
- Recorded: 23–31 August 2003
- Venue: Civic, Christchurch; Altitude, Hamilton; St. James Theatre, Auckland; The Starlight Ballroom, Wellington
- Genre: Rock music
- Length: 97:46
- Label: WEA
- Producer: Malcolm Welsford, Shihad

Pacifier Live is a live album by Shihad (then-performing as Pacifier), which was recorded on their August 2003 tour of their homeland New Zealand. It was issued on 2×CD on 23 November 2003 via WEA with an additional 1000 copies on vinyl. Pacifier Live reached the top 10 on the New Zealand albums chart.

== Track listing ==
=== Disc 1 ===
1. "You Again" - 5:11
2. "Gimme Gimme" - 5:29
3. "Run" - 3:52
4. "Semi Normal" - 3:12
5. "Wait And See" - 5:02
6. "La La Land" - 2:53
7. "Bullitproof" - 3:31
8. "Derail" - 4:28
9. "Bitter" - 4:00
10. "Everything" - 4:55
11. "The Brightest Star" - 3:05
12. "My Mind's Sedate" - 3:14

=== Disc 2 ===
1. "Comfort Me" - 3:15
2. "Interconnector" - 2:48
3. "Ghost From The Past" - 2:49
4. "Deb's Night Out" - 4:11
5. "The General Electric" - 6:18
6. "Pacifier" - 4:10
7. "Toxic Shock" - 3:48
8. "Screwtop" - 6:05
9. "The Call" - 4:40
10. "Thin White Line" - 3:20
11. "A Day Away" - 2:44
12. "Home Again" - 4:40

== Certifications ==
Certifications for Live
| Region | Certification | Certified units/sales |
|---|---|---|
| New Zealand (RMNZ) | Gold | 7,500^{^} |
^{^} Shipments figures based on certification alone.
