= Pacifier (Shihad album) =

Studio album by Shihad (as Pacifier)
- Released: 19 August 2002
- Recorded: Pulse Recording Studios, Los Angeles
- Genre: Hard rock; alternative rock; post-grunge
- Length: 44:00
- Label: WEA, Warner Music Group, Arista Records, BMG
- Producer: Josh Abraham

Shihad chronology
| The General Electric (1999) | Pacifier (2002) | Love Is The New Hate (2005) |

Singles from Pacifier
- 1. "Comfort Me" Released: 2002; 2. "Run" Released: 2002; 3. "Bullitproof" Released: 2003; 4. "Everything" Released: 2003

Professional ratings
Review scores
| Source | Rating |
|---|---|
| AllMusic | 3/5 stars |

Pacifier (re-released as The Pacifier Album) is the fifth studio album released by New Zealand rock band Shihad. At the time of the release, they were performing under the name Pacifier due to controversy surrounding the similarity of the word Shihad to jihad. The name Pacifier was derived from the single of the same name from their previous album, The General Electric.

Released on 19 August 2002, songs such as "Run" and "Bullitproof" went on to become hit singles. "Bullitproof" peaked at number 27 on the US Billboard Mainstream Rock Tracks and number 37 on the Billboard Modern Rock Tracks. However, it still failed to break the band into the United States. "Everything" was used in the closing credits of the 2002 film Swimfan while Bullitproof was featured on the soundtrack for the video game MVP Baseball 2003.

The band, and lead singer Jon Toogood especially, have since expressed displeasure with the album, calling it "overproduced" and "bullshit – that would've been the wrong album to be big on." In 2023, bassist Karl Kippenberger said, "I love those songs. I love them being part of our history...It's OK to fall in and out of love with your own stuff, you know?"

This album features Scott Weiland (Stone Temple Pilots and Velvet Revolver) and DJ Lethal (Limp Bizkit and House of Pain) on the track "Coming Down".

The album was produced by Josh Abraham, of Thirty Seconds to Mars/Michelle Branch/Weezer fame.

One version of this album included the "Weapons of Mass Destruction" bonus disc and yet another version contained a bonus disc featuring live acoustic tracks from the "Helen Young Sessions".

== The Pacifier Album re-release ==

In 2023, the album was re-released on vinyl. For this edition the band name is restored to Shihad and the album is retitled The Pacifier Album.

== Track listing ==
| No. | Title | Length |
|---|---|---|
| 1. | "Comfort Me" | 3:18 |
| 2. | "Semi-Normal" | 2:55 |
| 3. | "Run" | 3:49 |
| 4. | "Everything" | 4:29 |
| 5. | "Stranger" | 3:30 |
| 6. | "Home" | 4:01 |
| 7. | "Nothing" | 3:31 |
| 8. | "Bullitproof" | 3:25 |
| 9. | "Walls" | 4:28 |
| 10. | "Just a Shadow" | 3:17 |
| 11. | "Trademark" | 3:21 |
| 12. | "Coming Down" | 4:15 |
| Total length: | | 44:17 |

== Bonus discs ==
=== Weapons of Mass Destruction ===
| No. | Title | Length |
|---|---|---|
| 1. | "Toxic Shock" | 3:14 |
| 2. | "Early Grave" | 2:52 |
| 3. | "Analizer" | 3:30 |
| 4. | "The Wrong Idea" | 3:40 |
| 5. | "Really Glad" | 2:40 |

=== Helen Young Sessions ===
| No. | Title | Length |
|---|---|---|
| 1. | "Run" | 3:57 |
| 2. | "Weight of the World" | 4:13 |
| 3. | "Coming Down" | 4:02 |
| 4. | "Brightest Star" | 2:53 |
| 5. | "Walls" | 4:08 |
| 6. | "Home" | 3:42 |

== Credits ==
- All songs by: Pacifier (except "Bullitproof" written by Pacifier and Dave Bassett)
- Produced by: Josh Abraham
- Recorded and Mixed by: Ryan Williams, with Andy Wallace on "Comfort Me", "Everything", "Bullitproof"
- Mastered by: Tom Baker

== Certifications ==
| Region | Certification | Certified units/sales |
|---|---|---|
| New Zealand (RMNZ) | 2× Platinum | 30,000^{^} |
^{^} Shipments figures based on certification alone.
