= Churn (Shihad album) =

Studio album by Shihad
- Released: 12 July 1993
- Recorded: February 1993
- Studio: York Street Studio
- Genre: Alternative metal; noise rock
- Length: 41:24
- Label: Wildside Records
- Producer: Jaz Coleman

Shihad chronology
Devolve EP (1991)	Churn (1993)	Killjoy (1995)

Churn is the debut album by Shihad, released in New Zealand by Wildside Records on 12 July 1993 and in Europe on 25 June 1994 on Modern Music. The album was recorded in February 1993, with production by Jaz Coleman of Killing Joke.

== Track listing ==
1. "Factory" - 5:17
2. "Screwtop" - 6:09
3. "Fracture" - 5:08
4. "Stations" - 4:39
5. "Clapper Loader" - 3:29
6. "I Only Said" - 4:00
7. "Derail" - 4:46
8. "Bone Orchard" - 3:25
9. "The Happy Meal" - 4:30

The Japanese version included an additional track called "Prayer".

== Singles chart performance ==
Year	Single	NZ Top 40 Singles
February 1994	"Stations"	35
August 1994	"Derail"	33

== Certifications ==
Region	Certification	Certified units/sales
New Zealand (RMNZ)	Gold	7,500^{^}
^{^} Shipments figures based on certification alone.
