= York Street Studio =

Recording studio based in New Zealand

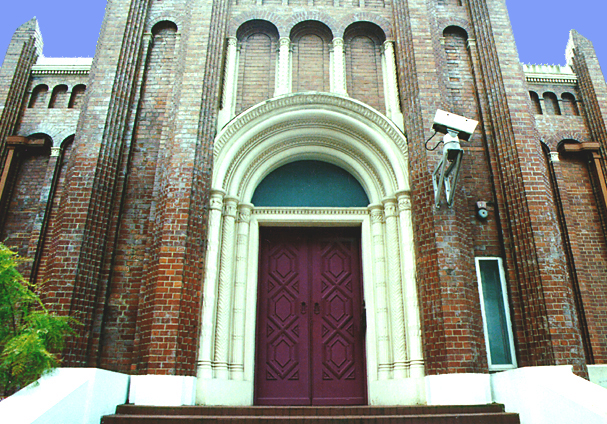
Studio 2 on Shortland Street

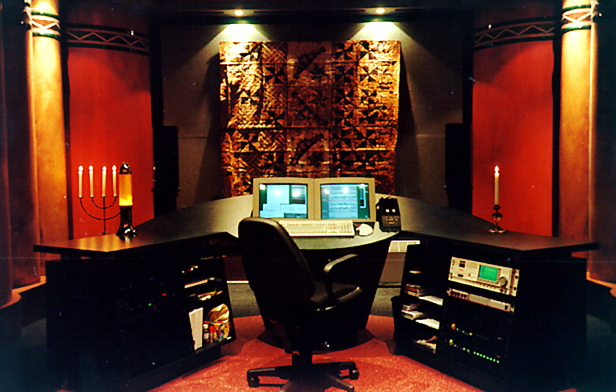
Mastering Room at Studio 2

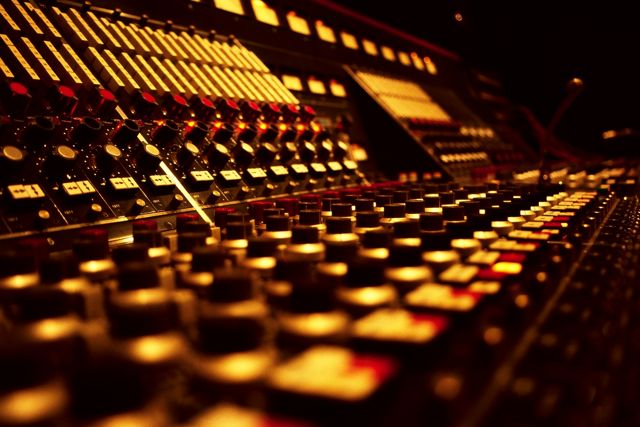
Close up view of Neve

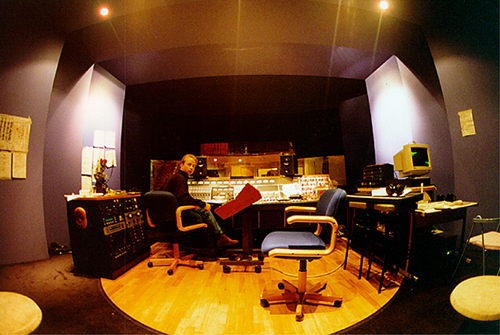
Studio 1 Control Room

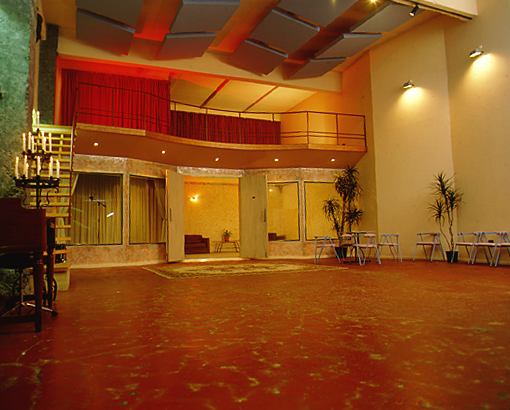
The Live Room

York Street Recording Studio was a Recording Studio based in Auckland, New Zealand. Founded and built by producer and engineer Martin Williams, producer Malcolm Welsford and Jaz Coleman it quickly became New Zealand's leading music recording, mixing and mastering facility. In 2000 the studio was purchased by software developer Adrien de Croy and was then managed by Jeremy McPike. In April, 2014, though at that time still very busy, the Studios closed due to its 21-year lease, and was sold. Manager Jeremy McPike then went to work at Roundhead Studios.

== The Studio ==
The studio had a vintage 1974 EMI Neve, one of only seven made. The recording area was a 1,000 sq ft (93 m^{2}) main room and mezzanine, with two adjoining isolation rooms and a third separate isolation booth. The main room was 20 ft (6.1 m) high and was New Zealand's only high-stud professional studio live room. It had virtually no permanent acoustic absorption, relying on room shape and deflective elements to achieve control of reverberation.

== Artists and producers ==
The studio was frequented by various artists from throughout New Zealand and Australia, as well as several other artists from around the world. The list of the studio's clients include: Silverchair, Crowded House, Bic Runga, Shihad, Interpol, Che Fu, Dave Dobbyn, Daniel Bedingfield, Goldenhorse, No Doubt, Fur Patrol, The Feelers, Strawpeople, Killing Joke, Black River Drive, Bailterspace, Semisonic, The Exponents, Headless Chickens, The Stereo Bus, Engelbert Humperdinck, Hello Sailor, Blindspott, Tadpole, Head Like A Hole, Zed, Ben King, Pluto, Scarf, Supergroove, Brooke Fraser, Payola, Carly Binding, 48May, Phil Rudd, The Dukes, The Lookie Loos and Zero T.

Producers who have worked at the studio include; Mitchell Froom, Jaz Coleman, Youth (producer), Gil Norton, Malcolm Foster, Chris Van De Geer, Andrew Buckton, Malcolm Welsford, Danton Supple, Tchad Blake, Brian Paulson, Greg Haver, Bradey Blade, Scott Seabright, P Money, and Jonathan Campbell.
