= Malcolm Welsford =

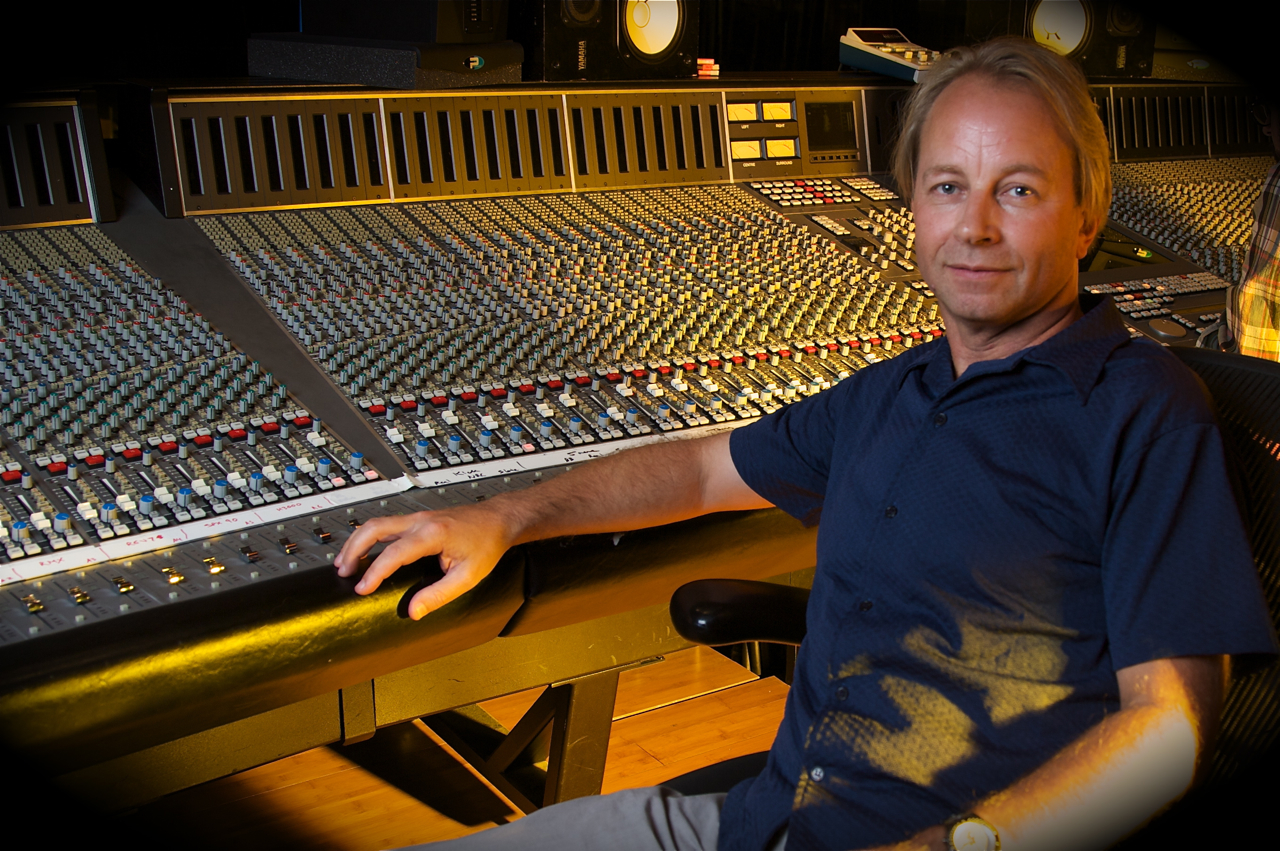

Background information
- Origin: New Zealand
- Genre: Rock
- Occupations: Record producer, audio engineer
- Website: www.welsford.net

Malcolm Welsford is a New Zealand record producer best known for his work with Shihad, The Feelers and Supergroove.

== Early career ==
Welsford's professional recording career began in 1984 at a small largely unknown Studio called Frontier Studios, Wellington New Zealand. Frontier was located in the same building as Marmalade Audio and was best known for recording local reggae bands on 1-inch 16-track tapes. In 1986 he became a freelance engineer at Marmalade Studios until relocating to Auckland in 1989 where he mainly worked out of Mandrill Studios and Phil Rudd's Phil Rudd own personal Studio.

In 1992 he began construction of York Street Studios with Producer/engineer and studio owner Martin Williams & Killing Joke front man Jaz Coleman which opened to the public in 1993. In 1996 Welsford took over the old Radio New Zealand Studio building on Shortland Street which became Studio Two and housed several other private studios including Tom Bailey's studio.

Welsford relocated his production operation to Karekere Studios early 2000. Karekare, New Zealand is best known for its natural beauty, black sand beaches and isolation.

Between 1993 and 2005, Welsford contributed to the success of many international and local New Zealand artists such as ZED, Garageland, Pacifier, Shihad, Bike, The Feelers, Supergroove, Headless Chickens, The D4, Indicator Dogs, Eight, PanAm, Eye TV, Neil and Tim Finn, Bic Runga and Killing Joke.

Welsford moved to the United States early 2005 to focus on artist development.

== Later career ==
Welsford developed and produced two albums with Adam Lambert who was the runner up for the 2009 American Idol series. He is the producer of Take One, Adam Lambert's current release with Coldwater Entertainment. Welsford also produced over a dozen unreleased tracks which Adam Lambert penned with Guitarist Monte Pittman.

Production/mix credits include Christina Perri, Adam Lambert, Shihad, Supergroove, The Feelers, Breathe, Garageland, Tadpole, Bike, Eight, Stellar*, Neil Finn, Tim Finn, The Headless Chickens, Emma Paki, The D4, ZED, and Under the Influence - 21 Years of Flying Nun Records.

== Selected discography ==
- ANDY GRAMMER - 'Slow'
- CHRISTINA PERRI - 'Jar of Hearts' Billboard UK#4, Billboard US #11
- ADAM LAMBERT - Take One | Billboard#6 Indie, Billboard #72 Top 200
- NEIL FINN - One Nil (Capitol) (Charts: #1 NZ, #9 Aus, #14 UK, #29 US) Neil Finn
- TIM FINN - Feeding the Gods
- SHIHAD/PACIFIER (BMG/Polygram/Warners Churn (Gold), Killjoy (Gold), Shihad/Shihad (Gold), Pacifier Live (Gold)Shihad
- TADPOLE ( EMI-Buddafinger Album, 2× Platinum Tadpole (band)
- RUNGA/DOBBYN/FINN (Together in Concert – Sony)Together in Concert: Live
- THE FEELERS – Warner Music, Supersystem (No.1 selling album for over 59 weeks, 5× Platinum Supersystem (album)
- SUPERGROOVE (BMG, Traction – No.1 selling album, 6× Platinum Supergroove
- THE HEADLESS CHICKENS (Mushroom George – No.1 selling single The Headless Chickens
- ZED (Title track: "The Hot Chick" Soundtrack - Touchstone Pictures)
- The D4 (Get Loose. Charted #64 on UK Charts The D4
- LONDON SYMPHONY ORCHESTRA (Rolling Stones Symphonic Album)

== Awards ==
"The National Academy of Recording Arts & Sciences is also known as the Recording Academy concur that Mr. Welsford's accomplishments are widely recognized within the United States and abroad. Since 1994 he has been the recipient of eight Grammy recognized awards as well as three gold album awards, five platinum album award and four multi-platinum album awards".

- 2000 Music awards – nominated best Producer.
- 1999 Top NZ selling album by a NZ artist.
- 1998 Top NZ selling album.
- Awarded Producer of the Year at the 1998 New Zealand Music Awards - Pressure Man (The Feelers).
- Awarded Producer of the Year at the 1997 New Zealand Music Awards Backspacer (Supergroove). Award shared with Karl Steven
- Awarded Producer and Engineer of the Year at the 1995 New Zealand Music Awards Traction (Supergroove). Producer award was shared with co-producer, Karl Steven
- Awarded Engineer of the Year, 1994 New Zealand Music Awards Churn (Shihad) 1994.
- US Billboard Visionary Award for Outstanding Producer/Engineer
