= Tom Larkin (musician) =

New Zealand drummer

- Born: 18 September 1971 (age 55); Wellington, New Zealand
- Genre: Alternative rock
- Occupations: Musician, producer, band manager
- Instrument: Drums
- Member of: Shihad

Tom Larkin (born 18 September 1971) is a New Zealand musician and record producer. He is the drummer, backing vocalist and a founding member of the alternative rock band Shihad. He grew up in Wellington, New Zealand but now lives in Melbourne in Australia.

== Early life and family ==
Larkin was born in Wellington, New Zealand, to Thomas Cedric Larkin and Sarah Marianne Williams. As a kid, he often played the drums so loud in his parents’ big Kelburn house in Wellington, that the neighbours sometimes complained. While at school at Wellington High in the late 1980s he met Jon Toogood and together they formed Shihad back in 1988. The first gig was at the Clarendon Tavern in Courtenay Place which was the first of thousands of live gigs performed by the band over many years.

Shihad's first release was back in 1990 with the single 'Devolve' which went to number 13 on the New Zealand charts.

Tom Larkin is the son of former New Zealand cricketer (he played for Taranaki and Wellington) and New Zealand diplomat Thomas Cedric Larkin who died at the age of 103 in 2021. He has a sister Daisy and a brother Adam.

== Career ==
In addition to being one of the founders, Larkin was Shihad's manager and tour manager during the band's early era. As of 2022, Shihad have released 12 albums and 8 EPs over 30 years. Shihad's most recent studio album Old Gods was released in 2021 after a seven-year break and reached number one on the New Zealand charts.

In addition to his involvement with Shihad, Larkin runs a recording studio in Melbourne called Homesurgery Recordings. As of August 2014, Homesurgery represents the bands The Butterfly Effect, Cairo Knife Fight, Calling All Cars, The Sinking Teeth, Strangers and Villainy. The recording facility is located in the Melbourne suburb of Brunswick.

In the role of producer, Larkin has worked with bands such as Bodyjar, Alien Weaponry, Young and Restless, The Galvatrons, Calling All Cars, The Getaway Plan, Rook, Reptiles, Red Ink, Fur Patrol, Villainy, Strangers, High Tension, Shihad, King Cannons, Arts Martial, Young Heretics and Ceres.

=== Aotearoa Music Awards ===
The Aotearoa Music Awards (previously known as New Zealand Music Awards (NZMA)) are an annual awards night celebrating excellence in New Zealand music and have been presented annually since 1965.

Year	Nominee / work	Award	Result	Ref.
2010	Tom Larkin (as part of Shihad)	New Zealand Music Hall of Fame	inductee	
2018	Simon Gooding, Tom Larkin, Hammerhead for Tū (album by Alien Weaponry)	Producer of the Year	Won	
2018	Simon Gooding, Tom Larkin, Scott Seabright & Samuel Sproull for Tū (album by Alien Weaponry)	Engineer of the Year	Nominated	
