= The General Electric =

1999 studio album by Shihad

Studio album by Shihad
- Released: 4 October 1999
- Recorded: June–July 1999
- Studios: Factory Studios, Vancouver
- Genres: Alternative rock; industrial rock; hard rock
- Length: 48:01
- Label: WEA
- Producer: GGGarth

Shihad chronology
Shihad (1996)	The General Electric (1999)	Pacifier (2002)

Singles from The General Electric
- 1. "My Mind's Sedate" Released: 1999; 2. "The General Electric" Released: 2000; 3. "Pacifier" Released: 2000; 4. "Sport and Religion" Released: 2000

The General Electric is the fourth studio album by New Zealand band Shihad, released in October 1999. It peaked at No. 1 on the New Zealand albums chart and was certified triple platinum (under New Zealand). and on the Australian ARIA Albums Chart it peaked at No. 23. It was their first album to gain platinum certification in New Zealand (has since gone 3× platinum) and is Shihad's best selling album to date.

Previously released songs – "Wait and See", "Just Like Everybody Else" and "Spacing" – were re-recorded for the album.

The General Electric was produced by Garth Richardson, who had previously produced bands such as Rage Against the Machine, Chevelle and Red Hot Chili Peppers, Mudvayne, and Rise Against.

== Reception ==
Andrew McMillen of The Australian said, "This Kiwi-born band bottled lightning with its fourth album, which found the sweet spot between massive guitar riffs, pop sensibilities and singer Jon Toogood's penchant for writing anthemic choruses best sung en masse."

== Track listing ==
No.	Title	Length
1.	"Intro"	1:05
2.	"My Mind's Sedate"	2:54
3.	"The General Electric"	5:46
4.	"Wait and See"	4:35
5.	"Pacifier"	4:03
6.	"Thin White Line"	3:16
7.	"Only Time"	4:39
8.	"Just Like Everybody Else"	2:50
9.	"Sport and Religion"	4:32
10.	"Spacing"	4:20
11.	"The Metal Song"	4:24
12.	"Life in Cars"	4:03
13.	"Brightest Star"	3:30
Total length:		48:01

=== Bonus disc ===
1. "The General Electric" Live at the Gold Coast BDO
2. "Thin White Line" Live at Adelaide BDO
3. "You Again" Live at Sydney BDO
4. "My Mind's Sedate" Live at Melbourne BDO
5. "Pacifier" Live at the Gold Coast BDO
6. "Home Again" Live at the Auckland BDO
7. "The General Electric" Music Video
8. "My Mind's Sedate" Music Video
9. "Pacifier" Music Video
10. "Wait and See" Music Video

This bonus disc was also released by itself as either The Channel V Tapes in Australia or The Channel Z Tapes in New Zealand

== Credits ==
- All music and lyrics by Shihad
- Produced by GGGarth
- Mixed by Randy Staub
- Mastered by Howie Weinberg
- Recorded by GGGarth, Sleepy J and Scott Ternan at the Factory Studios, Vancouver, BC, Canada in July 1999
- Mixed at The Factory Studios, Vancouver, BC, Canada
- Mastered at Masterdisc, New York, NY, USA
- Additional background vocals by Jamie Koch

== Certifications ==
Region	Certification	Certified units/sales
Australia (ARIA)	Gold	35,000^{^}
New Zealand (RMNZ)	3× Platinum	45,000^{‡}
^{^} Shipments figures based on certification alone.^{‡} Sales+streaming figures based on certification alone.
