= Karl Kippenberger =

New Zealand bassist

- Birth name: Karl Brenton Jamie Kippenberger
- Born: 26 August 1973 (age 51); Wellington, New Zealand
- Genres: Alternative rock
- Occupation: Musician
- Instrument: Bass guitar
- Member of: Shihad

Karl Brenton Jamie Kippenberger (born 26 August 1973) is a New Zealand musician, best known as the bass guitarist for the rock band Shihad.

== Biography ==
He is the grandson of Captain E.T Kippenberger, great nephew of Major-General Sir Howard Kippenberger. His mother is of Cook Islands descent, from the islands of Rarotonga, Mangaia, and Atiu.

Kippenberger grew up in Pukerua Bay just north of Wellington and attended Kāpiti College (formerly Raumati District High School). Kāpiti College is also the same high school that produced film director Peter Jackson, former All Black Christian Cullen as well as several other well-known Kiwi musicians, including Ara Adams-Tamatea of Katchafire and Danny Rodda.

After his 6th Form (year 12) year, he left to attend Aotea College for his final high school year.

== Awards and nomination ==
=== Aotearoa Music Awards ===
The Aotearoa Music Awards (previously known as New Zealand Music Awards (NZMA)) are an annual awards night celebrating excellence in New Zealand music and have been presented annually since 1965.

Year	Nominee / work	Award	Result	Ref.
1997	Karl Kippenberger & Jon Toogood for Shihad	Album Cover of the Year	Nominated	
2000	Karl Kippenberger for The General Electric	Album Cover of the Year	Won	
2010	Karl Kippenberger (as part of Shihad)	New Zealand Music Hall of Fame	inductee	
