= Shihad =

New Zealand alternative rock band (1988–2025)

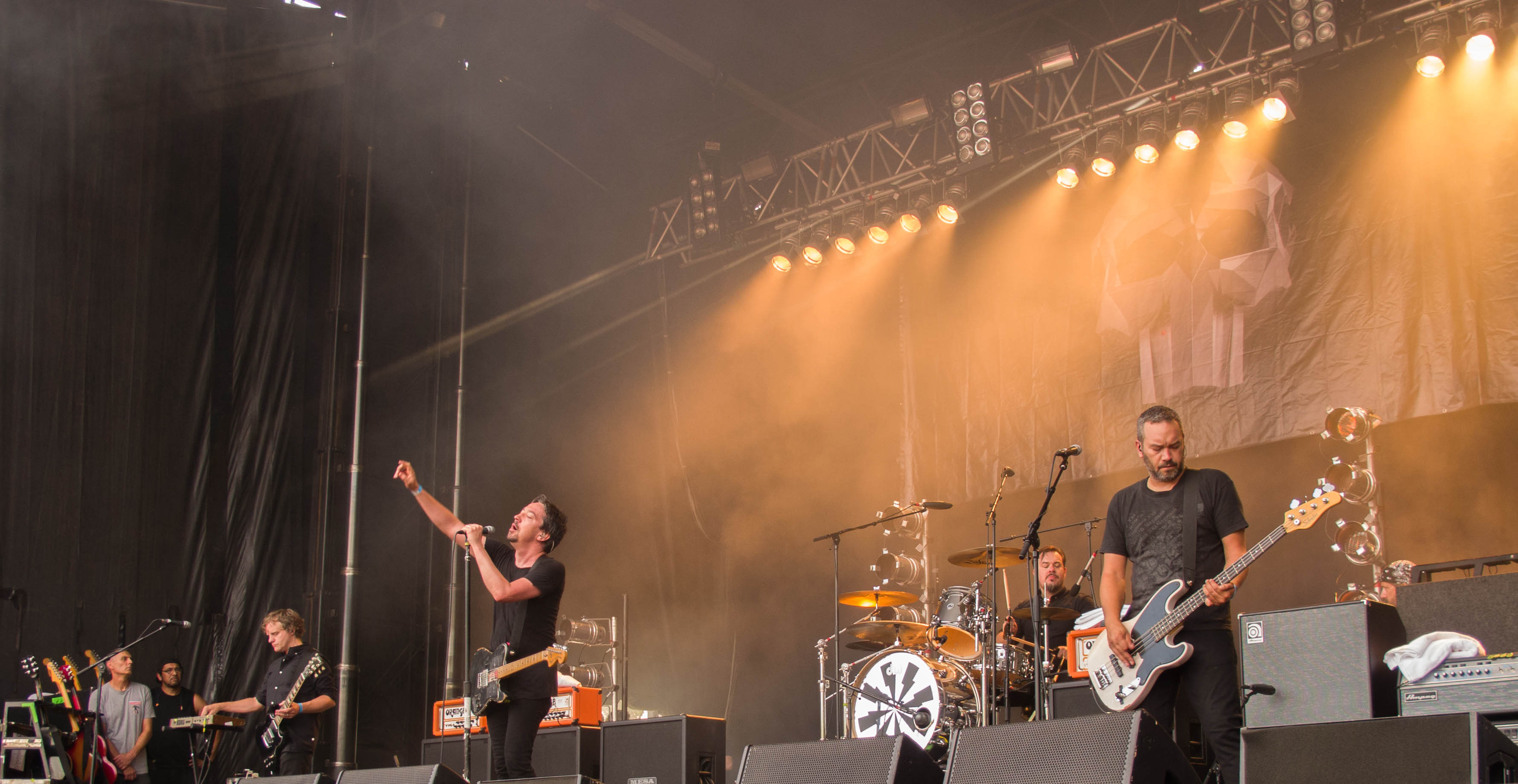
- Shihad performing in 2016; L to r: Phil Knight, Jon Toogood, Tom Larkin, Karl Kippenberger

Background information
- Also known as: Exit (1988), Pacifier (2002–2004)
- Origin: Wellington, New Zealand
- Genres: Alternative rock; alternative metal; hard rock; industrial rock (early)
- Years active: 1988–2025
- Labels: Pagan; Wildside; Noise; Festival; Polydor; Warner; Roadrunner; Arista; BMG
- Spinoffs: The Adults
- Past members: Tom Larkin; Jon Toogood; Phil Knight; Karl Kippenberger; Geoff Duncan; Geoff Daniels; Hamish Laing
- Website: shihad.com

Shihad were a rock band formed in Wellington, New Zealand, in 1988. The band consisted of founders Tom Larkin (drums, backing vocals, samplers), Phil Knight (lead guitar, synthesiser, backing vocals) and Jon Toogood (lead vocals, rhythm guitar), who were joined by Karl Kippenberger (bass guitar, backing vocals) in 1991. The band were known as Pacifier between 2002 and 2004.

Six of Shihad's studio albums have peaked at number one–The General Electric (October 1999), Pacifier (September 2002), Beautiful Machine (April 2008), Ignite (September 2010), FVEY (August 2014) and Old Gods (October 2021). They hold the record for most number-one records for any New Zealand artist, with six. As of 2014, Shihad had the most Top 40 New Zealand chart singles for any local artist, with 25; three of these reached the top ten. The singles "Home Again", "Pacifier", and "Bitter" are listed at No. 30, 60 and 83, respectively, in the APRA Top 100 New Zealand Songs of All Time.

== History ==
=== Formation and early years (1988–1996) ===
Tom Larkin and Jon Toogood formed Exit in 1985 in Wellington with various short-term fellow school members. Larkin and Toogood had met at Wellington High School, and shared an interest in heavy metal. They were generally found in the school's music room, as Toogood later recalled, "That's where we learnt to be a band – it had amps and a guitar and a drum-kit – that's what kept us at school." During their Year 11 school ball, having no one to dance with, they spray-painted graffiti in the toilets, including "AC/DC Rules", and were suspended from school.

Exit were renamed Shihad in mid-1988 when Geoff Duncan on bass guitar and Phil Knight on guitar joined. The new name was a misspelling of jihad (Arabic for "striving" or "struggling") as used in Frank Herbert's science-fiction novel, Dune (1965). They had heard the term when watching David Lynch's 1984 film of the same name. Larkin later told John Grayson of Opus (University of Newcastle, Australia), "Well, see that's the biggest cock-up out. When we were 15 we were all into this sci-fi movie Dune. See, Dune uses all these Arabic words throughout the movie and the end battle is a Jihad. We were stupid and thought it'd be a great name for a band so we called ourselves Shihad cause we couldn't even spell it."

The group's influences were Metallica and Slayer, and later included Pink Floyd, AC/DC and Led Zeppelin. The group began performing in local pubs, even though they were under-age, and performed cover versions of Metallica and Motörhead tracks. At Shihad's debut performance they provided a cover version of Sex Pistol's "Anarchy in the U.K." but blew out the venue's PA. Duncan left soon after and following a succession of temporary musicians they were joined in 1989 by Hamish Laing on bass guitar. In 1990, Gerald Dwyer, the former frontman of local punk band Flesh-D-Vice became their talent manager. He also managed Shihad's then-support act, Head Like a Hole (HLAH).

Phil Knight (at right), Shakespeare Hotel, Napier, New Zealand, December 1993

The line-up of Knight, Larkin, Laing and Toogood recorded their debut track, "Down Dance", which was issued in August 1990 as a B-side of a split single with the A-side, "Dogs Are Talking" by Australian group, the Angels. The other B-side, "Live It Up", was by Auckland band, Nine Livez. Both Shihad and Nine Livez supported the Angels at their New Zealand shows during 1990. Shihad supported tours by international visitors, Faith No More and Motörhead. "Down Dance" also appeared on their first extended play, Devolve (1990) via Pagan Records, which was re-released in mid-1991 and reached the New Zealand singles chart top 20 in July. Another EP track, "The Wizard", was a cover version of Black Sabbath's 1970 work. Bridget Herlihy of Ambient Light described the EP as a "thrash-metal affair" with "four hard and fast tracks."

In August 1991 Laing left and was replaced on bass guitar by Karl Kippenberger. Kippenberger's second gig with the group was a support slot to AC/DC at Athletic Park, Wellington in front of an audience of 20,000. During 1992 Larkin and Toogood collaborated with Nigel Regan (of HLAH) on guitar in the side-project, SML, which later issued an album, Is That It?, in 1995. Shihad signed with Wildside Records to release their debut studio album, Churn (1993), which was produced by Jaz Coleman (of Killing Joke). It reached No. 9 on the New Zealand albums chart.

According to music journalist, Ed Nimmervoll, "their sound had grown more industrial under the influence of [Coleman]." Herlihy noticed their sonation "had evolved to be more mature; a fuller sound and slightly more melodic approach." The album provided their highest charting single, "I Only Said", which peaked at No. 3. They toured both New Zealand and Australia. They were described by a Woroni writer, in September 1993, as an "industrial metal band" and "despite coming out of a country only recently introduced to colour TV, this is damn close to the cutting edge of a very interesting genre." In February 1994 they performed at the Big Day Out concert in Auckland – the first time the roving festival occurred in New Zealand. The group signed with Noise Records in August for European releases and toured there for two months.

Their second album, Killjoy, was released in May 1995 and was produced by Malcolm Welsford, who also engineered and mixed the record. It reached No. 4 and they followed with a tour of Western Europe supporting Faith No More for seven weeks. They remained in Europe for four months attending various festivals, Dynamo in Holland, the Phoenix Festival in Britain, and the Roskilde in Denmark. From September of that year they worked in the United States for three months including appearing at Foundations Forum alongside Motörhead, and at gigs in Los Angeles and New York City. At the 1996 New Zealand Music Awards they won four trophies, Album of the Year for Killjoy, Best Male Vocalist for Toogood, Best Group and International Achievement.

Their manager at the time Gerald Dwyer died of a morphine overdose just after Shihad's performance at the 1996 Big Day Out, in Auckland. They had found Dwyer's body in his motel room after returning from the gig. The group missed the Gold Coast concert to attend Dwyer's funeral and then re-joined the Big Day Out tour in Sydney and continued to the other Australian venues.

=== Self-titled album and The General Electric (1996–2001) ===
The group started work on their third studio album, Shihad, in June 1996 at Auckland's York Street Studios, co-produced by the group with Welsford. They also toured both New Zealand and Australia. The album's lead single, "La La Land" (October 1996), received "strong airplay support" on Australia's national youth radio station, Triple J. Shihad followed in the next month and peaked at No. 11 in New Zealand but did not reach the top 50 on the ARIA Albums Chart. Nimmervoll observed, "[it] marked a shift towards a more melodic sound." Jody Scott and Iain Shedden of The Australian felt they were their country's "most popular band" and the album "is bound to earn them universal favour." They appeared on the front cover of Rip It Up Magazine, with the accompanying article by John Russell describing their support slot for AC/DC's Ballbreaker World Tour in Auckland in November 1996. Russell noticed, "[they] battled for almost half an hour against audience indifference and the most horrid guitar sound I think they've ever had."

From February 1997 they supported the European release of their album with concerts in Germany, France, the Netherlands, Spain, Italy and United Kingdom. Along the way the group had briefly performed alongside Australian band Silverchair, who were on their first European tour. After that tour Shihad relocated to Melbourne as their base by 1998 and negotiated a contract with Warner Music Australasia. At Vancouver's Factory Studios in mid-1999 they recorded their fourth studio album, The General Electric (October 1999) with Canadian producer Garth Richardson (Rage Against the Machine, Chevelle, Red Hot Chili Peppers). It is their first number-one album on the New Zealand charts and also reached the top 30 in Australia. Nimmervoll felt they "welded the melody and harmony they had discovered on the self-titled album with multi-tracking experimentation and the hard edge in keeping with [their] live sound." While Sedate's Brannavan Gnanalingam wrote, "another classic album – tighter and more focused... [they] felt settled and creative, and experienced one of their most productive periods."

The album's lead single, "My Mind's Sedate" (September 1999), reached the New Zealand top 10. Australian radio station, Double J's programme Classic Albums revisited the album in September 2019 and its reviewer responded, "[it] roars out of the blocks with an onslaught of vitriol in the song 'My Mind's Sedate'... [they] waste no time getting to one of many truths on their fourth album." Another popular track from the album, "Pacifier", was issued in 2000 as the album's third single. Double J's reviewer continued, "whilst tracks like 'Wait and See' and 'Pacifier' deliver a heavy dose of exhilaration as they swoop and soar. But, at their core, these songs are all born and bound together by a focused emotional, social and culturally rooted vision of the world at large."

Oz Music Project's Delilah Dede caught their performance at The Playroom, Brisbane in March 2000 on a bill with Magic Dirt and Pretty Violet Stain. Dede observed, "it's hard not to like Toogood, with his Bobby Gillespie rock-star looks (without the pretensions), and the passion and blistering ferocity of Trent Reznor. The boy's got charisma: he's got stage presence, and he was bounding all over the stage: he has energy." She felt, "their sound was hard and bangin', pulled in with anthemic overflow, a touch of funk and electronica, and eloquent, gutsy lyrics. Bold and raw, yet pure poetry."

=== Naming conflict: Shihad to Pacifier (2001–2004) ===
Early in 2001 Shihad focused their attention on the US market and signed with an American-based management. They started work on their next album, Pacifier (September 2002) with Josh Abraham producing at Hollywood's Pulse Recording Studios. However before recording was completed the September 11 attacks had occurred. Their management convinced the band to change their name due to the similarity between Shihad and the Arabic word jihad, which was now a sensitive term in the US. In January 2002 Shihad announced their intention to change their name, and at the 2002 Big Day Out concert in Auckland they sold T-shirts with Shihad and Remote printed below, indicating Remote was the new name. However due to Remote already being used, they settled on Pacifier, after the single from The General Electric. In mid-February their first performance as Pacifier occurred at the Viper Room, Los Angeles.

Some of their Australasian fan base was disappointed by the name change and protested with claims of the band selling out. Nevertheless the album reached number one in New Zealand and was their highest charting in Australia at No. 8. They had signed with US label, Arista Records for its North American release, which had a different track listing and included the track, "My Mind's Sedate" from The General Electric. Pacifier's third single, "Bullitproof", reached No. 27 on the Billboard Modern Rock Tracks chart – their only appearance on a US chart. Pacifier co-headlined the Kings of Rock Tour with Australian metallers Superheist. Sean Kemp of Oz Music Project caught their performance at Adelaide's Le Rox, and noticed they, "are still bundles of energy and always make sure that each and every person in the venue are getting into the sounds they create." While his "favourite Pacifier 'pop' song (according to Jon, this was a Heavy Metal night) a ditty called 'Bulletproof' [sic]." The group also issued a live album, Pacifier Live (November 2003), which had been recorded during their New Zealand tour earlier that year.

In Vancouver in September 2004, they started recording their sixth studio album, with Richardson co-producing. During the sessions the band announced they would change their name back to Shihad, "The events surrounding the name change and our choice to be known as Pacifier are well documented. As much as we believed in what we were doing, and the reasons for doing it at the time – the truth is we were wrong." In August 2005 Toogood expanded on why they had returned to Shihad:

We were in America while it invaded Iraq and had to play at festivals that were supposedly 'support the troops festivals' when we didn't believe in the war at all. That's what the song "All the Young Fascists" is about – the day we played Miami in front of 30,000 kids at this festival that was originally just a rock festival. A week out, just because of the timing, it was turned into the support the troops show and it was being simulcast live to Iraq. We were on this bill with these really ugly – what we call WWF – metal bands, and we were shitting ourselves. I just wanted to get out of there. Beside the stage was a paintball gun alley where kids were lining up to shoot effigies of Saddam Hussein, Osama bin Laden and (French president) Jacques Chirac. That was the weirdest one. The amount of times I actually pointed out to Americans the fact that their Statue of Liberty was a gift from the French and they were supposed to be mates.

The band's former name, Pacifier, was raffled off by the Australian radio station Triple J's Jay and the Doctor and was claimed by a little known band from Tasmania, Theory of Everything.

=== Love Is the New Hate, Beautiful Machine and Ignite (2005–2011) ===
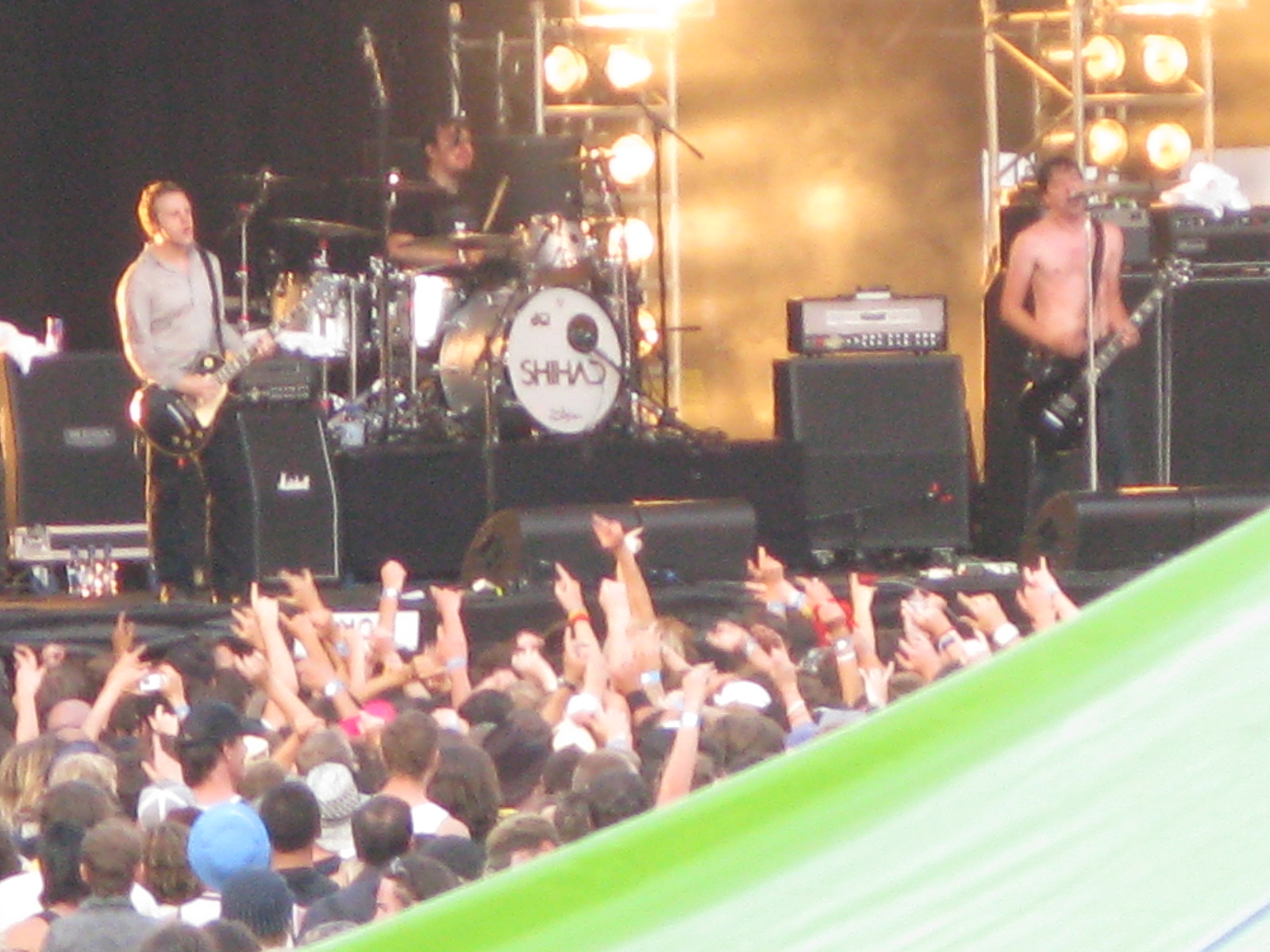
Shihad performing in 2008

Shihad released Love Is the New Hate in May 2005, with the related tour beginning with a free concert in Auckland's Aotea Square and comprised an extensive tour of Australia and New Zealand. In July they took to the main stage at Byron Bay's Splendour in the Grass, in front of an audience of 20,000. Love Is the New Hate reached No. 2 in New Zealand and No. 11 in Australia. It provided five singles but only "Alive" (January 2005) had any chart success, which peaked at No. 5 in New Zealand and top 40 in Australia. The band also toured with Cog, the Datsuns, and opened for Evanescence on part of their 2006 to 2007 world tour.

During February and March 2008 the band completed their One Will Hear The Other Tour, along Australia's east coast, playing 30 shows. "One Will Hear the Other" (January 2008) was released ahead of their seventh studio album, Beautiful Machine (April 2008), co-produced by the group with Alan Moulder (Nine Inch Nails, The Killers, Billy Corgan) and Scott Horscroft (the Sleepy Jackson, the Presets, the Panics) at Melbourne's Sing Sing Studios. In the second half of the year they toured New Zealand on the Beautiful Machine Tour promoting the album, which reached No. 1 in New Zealand and No 11 in Australia. For the tour they played medium-sized venues including Wellington Town Hall, with support from the Mint Chicks and Luger Boa. Shihad also toured with Gyroscope around Australia for that group's Australia Tour during that year. For New Year's Eve 2008/2009 the band performed in Gisborne, followed by shows later in January at the Coroglen Tavern and the Lake Hāwea Motor Inn.

Shihad supported AC/DC for the New Zealand leg of that group's Black Ice World Tour in January and February 2010. Also in January Shihad's new single "Cold Heart" was released, and was followed by "Sleepeater" (April) and "Lead or Follow" (July). "Sleepeater" is the only one to reach the local top 50. The singles appeared ahead of their eighth studio album, Ignite (24 September 2010) via Roadrunner Records/WEA, which was produced by the group. It debuted at number one in New Zealand, their fourth number-one studio album, and eventually achieved a gold certification. In Australia it peaked in the top 50. The band toured New Zealand in August 2010 performing their earlier albums Killjoy and The General Electric in full.

At the 2010 New Zealand Music Awards Shihad won the Legacy Award and were inducted into the New Zealand Music Hall of Fame. The group released a compilation album, The Meanest Hits, in October 2011, in two formats: a 20-track standard edition and a deluxe 38-track, two-disc edition. The standard version peaked in the top 10 in New Zealand. Also in October the band re-released their 1990 EP Devolve, for the first time in digital form on iTunes, and their entire singles and B-sides back catalogue, also on iTunes. On the second disc of the Australian version of The Meanest Hits, "Down Dance" was replaced with "Right Outta Nowhere", which does not appear on the New Zealand version.

=== FVEY and 30th anniversary (2012–2020) ===
For the production of their ninth studio album, Shihad worked with Jaz Coleman, of English post-punk band Killing Joke. Coleman produced Shihad's debut album, Churn, but a disagreement with the band occurred after the release of the album. Following a 15-year period in which Coleman and Shihad did not communicate, Coleman made amends with the band members at a London, UK awards ceremony. Toogood explained in June 2014:

Three years ago we were at the Metal Hammer awards. I hadn't talked to Jaz for ages. We'd had a falling out, I just didn't have time for him. Tom [Larkin] went and chatted to him and was like, "come over and talk to him". I was like, "Fuck that guy". But he was softer—he doesn't drink alcohol anymore. He's still gnarly and idealistic and brutal but minus the alcohol that makes him this focused machine. It was just the perfect meeting of what we wanted to do and having the right guy to do it with.

Prior to the recording process, Coleman informed the band, "I'm going to work you until you've made a great record". Toogood explained that the entirety of the ninth album was recorded live-in-the-studio, while Coleman conducted, and the band members were forced to focus entirely on each song as they were recorded, without outside distractions, such as mobile phones. After a two-month recording period, Toogood referred to their time with Coleman as a "bootcamp" and explained that they "needed someone to crack the whip" and he felt "purged" afterwards, "It's great to hang around guys you've been hanging around with since you were 18."

FVEY, the band's ninth album was released on 8 August 2014 via Warner Music New Zealand, and Toogood referred to FVEY as Shihad's best album in 15 years. It is their fifth number-one album, which at the time equalled the record for most number-one records by a New Zealand artist with Hayley Westenra. As of August 2014 the group had the most Top 40 New Zealand chart singles for any local artist, with 25.

The first single, "Think You're So Free", which was described by Double J's writer as sounding "more furious now than they ever have." Its music video was published on YouTube on 5 July 2014. Prior to the release of the album, Toogood explained that anger towards social injustice was a primary motivation during the songwriting process, "I don't have any answers but just as a concerned citizen, I'm going, 'This is bullshit'. The music's how we feel about that. It's fucking frustrating." Musically, the band chose a heavier sound, signifying a return to the first album, which the band found most enjoyable to play during their greatest hits tour. Shihad were featured on a new version of Jimmy Barnes' track, "Love and Hate", for the artist's album, 30:30 Hindsight (August 2014).

Shihad performed their second album, Killjoy, to support its re-release as a remastered version at The Powerhouse, Auckland in May 2015. Together with Carl Cox they co-headlined the 2015 Rhythm & Alps festival at Cardrona Valley, Wānaka on New Years Eve. The band celebrated their 30th anniversary with tours in New Zealand and Australia during 2018. Ambient Light's Tim Gruar attended their show in October at The Waterfront's Shed 6, Wellington, and felt, "[they] have come from a thrash metal beginning but as they've grown they've become more and more tuneful, bringing us really great anthems along the way. And we heard those tonight." Chris Familton of Doubtful Sounds caught their set at Sydney's The Metro Theatre in late November, which "began with 'Think You're So Free' from their most recent album FVEY and worked its way back, in chronological order to 'Factory' from their debut Churn.

In November 2020 Shihad signed with UNIFIED, the announcement coincided with the release of the group's cover version of Split Enz's "I Got You", the lead single from a tribute album by various artists, True Colours, New Colours: The Songs of Split Enz, due in February 2021.

=== Old Gods (2021–2025) ===
Throughout the first months of 2021, the band regularly updated Facebook with the progress of their 10th studio album, which was produced by Birds of Tokyo's Adam Spark. "Tear Down Those Names" was released to streaming services as the lead single to the band's tenth studio album, entitled Old Gods, which was released in October 2021.

On 13 November 2024, the band announced their final tour, which started in December and ended on 16 March 2025 in Wellington.

== Side projects ==
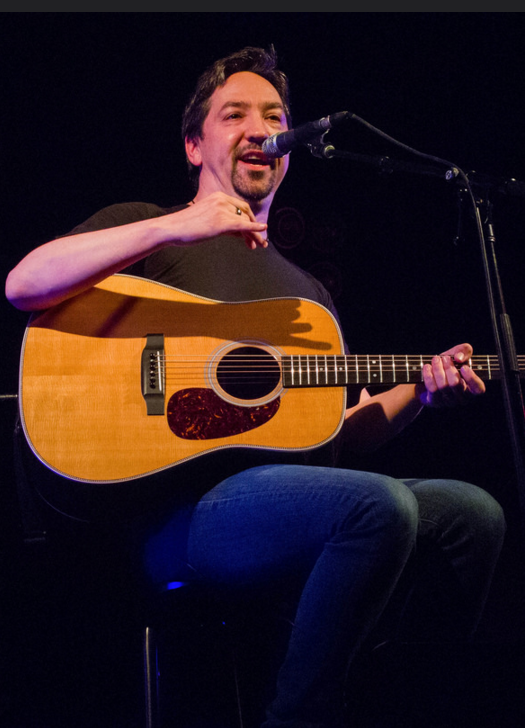
Jon Toogood, solo acoustic tour, at Tuning Fork, Auckland, October 2015

Shihad's members have pursued side projects or solo work. Larkin had established his own recording studio in Melbourne in 2008 as The Studio's in the City, which became Homesurgery Recordings in 2018. With fellow producers he worked on material by the Getaway Plan, Northeast Party House, and High Tension. Larkin recalled working with Karina Utomo of High Tension, "[who] found the concept of a standing in front of a microphone, headphones on, singing directly into it a disconnected and awkward" so he cleared the room like a stage, "giving her a simple handheld vocal mic and standing back as she cut loose, punching the walls, dropping to her knees screaming and delivering vocal takes that were brutal, unrepeatable and amazing to behold."

Toogood has collaborated with New Zealand artists, outside his work with Shihad, since 2009. He worked with Shayne Carter (Dimmer), Julia Deans (Fur Patrol), Ladi6, Anika Moa, Ruban and Kody Neilson (the Mint Chicks), and Tiki Taane. In the following year they formed the Adults as a rock supergroup, which released a self-titled album in June 2011. He has undertaken solo performances from 2015. Knight created a podcast series, What's Phil Worried About Today? He started the podcast series to help other people after he had experienced acute anxiety disorder and associated alcohol addiction. His alcohol addiction had affected his early years with Shihad, "I had a problem with drinking and playing back then also. Stopping that was a big positive shift in my performing."

== Members ==
=== Final line-up ===
- Tom Larkin – drums, backing vocals, samplers (1988–2025)
- Jon Toogood – lead vocals, rhythm guitar (1988–2025)
- Phil Knight – lead guitar, synthesiser, backing vocals (1988–2025)
- Karl Kippenberger – bass guitar, backing vocals (1991–2025)

=== Former members ===
- David Pokai - lead guitar (1988)
- Geoff Duncan – bass guitar (1988)
- Geoff Daniels – bass guitar (1988–1989)
- Hamish Laing – bass guitar (1989–1991)

== Discography ==
- Churn (1993)
- Killjoy (1995)
- Shihad (1996)
- The General Electric (1999)
- Pacifier (2002)
- Love Is the New Hate (2005)
- Beautiful Machine (2008)
- Ignite (2010)
- FVEY (2014)
- Old Gods (2021)

== Awards ==
=== Aotearoa Music Awards ===
The Aotearoa Music Awards (previously known as New Zealand Music Awards (NZMA)) are an annual awards night celebrating excellence in New Zealand music and have been presented annually since 1965.

Year	Nominee / work	Award	Result	Ref.
1992	Shihad	Most Promising Group	Won	
1992	Jon Toogood - Shihad	Most Promising Male	Nominated	
1994	Malcolm Welsford for Churn by Shihad	Engineer of the Year	Won	
1994	Jaz Coleman for Churn by Shihad	Producer of the Year	Nominated	
1994	Jon Toogood - Shihad	Male Vocalist of the Year	Nominated	
1995	Shihad	International Achievement	Nominated	
1996	Killjoy	Album of the Year	Won	
1996	Shihad	Group of the Year	Won	
1996	Jon Toogood - Shihad	Male Vocalist of the Year	Won	
1996	Shihad	International Achievement	Won	
1997	Karl Kippenberger & Jon Toogood for Shihad	Album Cover of the Year	Nominated	
1997	Shihad	Group of the Year	Nominated	
1997	Jon Toogood - Shihad	Male Vocalist of the Year	Nominated	
1997	Kevin Sprig for "La La Land" by Shihad	Music Video of the Year	Nominated	
1998	"Home Again"	Single of the Year	Nominated	
1998	Shihad	Group of the Year	Won	
1998	Jon Toogood - Shihad	Male Vocalist of the Year	Won	
1998	Mark Hurley for "Home Again" by Shihad	Music Video of the Year	Won	
1999	Shihad	Group of the Year	Nominated	
1999	Reuben Sutherland for "Wait & See" by Shihad	Music Video of the Year	Won	
2000	The General Electric	Album of the Year	Nominated	
2000	Shihad & Karl Kippenberger for The General Electric	Album Cover of the Year	Won	
2000	Shihad	Group of the Year	Nominated	
2000	Shihad	International Achievement	Nominated	
2000	"My Minds Sedate"	Single of the Year	Nominated	
2000	Jon Toogood - Shihad	Male Vocalist of the Year	Won	
2000	Reuben Sutherland for "My Minds Sedate" (Shihad)	Music Video of the Year	Won	
2001	"Pacifier"	Single of the Year	Nominated	
2001	Shihad	International Achievement	Won	
2001	Jon Toogood - Shihad	Male Vocalist of the Year	Nominated	
2001	Shihad	Group of the Year	Nominated	
2005	Love Is the New Hate	Album of the Year	Nominated	
2005	Love Is the New Hate	Rock Group of the Year	Won	
2005	Shihad	Peoples Choice	Nominated	
2005	Shihad	Group of the Year	Nominated	
2008	"One Will Hear the Other"	Single of the Year	Nominated	
2008	Beautiful Machine	Rock Group of the Year	Won	
2008	Shihad	Group of the Year	Nominated	
2010	Shihad	New Zealand Music Hall of Fame	inductee	
2010	Sam Peacocke for "Sleepeater" by Shihad	Music Video of the Year	Nominated	
2011	Ignite Shihad	Rock Group of the Year	Won	
2011	Ignite Shihad	Group of the Year	Nominated	
2015	FVEY	Album of the Year	Nominated	
2015	Shihad	Group of the Year	Nominated	
2015	Shihad	Rock Group of the Year	Won	
2015	Evan Short for FVEY by Shihad	Engineer of the Year	Nominated	
2015	Alt Group for FVEY by Shihad	Album Cover of the Year	Nominated	
2022	Old Gods	Rock Group of the Year	Nominated	

=== ARIA Music Awards ===
The ARIA Music Awards are a set of annual ceremonies presented by Australian Recording Industry Association (ARIA), which recognise excellence, innovation, and achievement across all genres of the music of Australia. They commenced in 1987.

Year	Nominee / work	Award	Result	Ref.
2000	The General Electric	Best Rock Album	Nominated	
2005	Love Is the New Hate	Best Rock Album	Nominated	
2014	FVEY	Best Hard Rock or Heavy Metal Album	Nominated	
2022	Old Gods	Best Hard Rock or Heavy Metal Album	Nominated	
