= Jon Toogood =

New Zealand musician (born 1971)

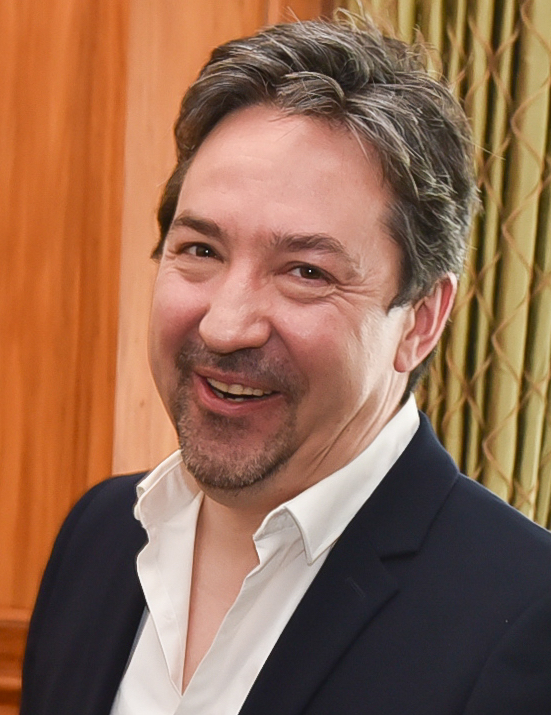
- Toogood in 2020

Background information
- Born: Jonathan Charles Toogood; 9 August 1971 (age 55); Wellington, New Zealand
- Genres: Alternative rock, hard rock, industrial rock, pop, worldbeat, acoustic rock
- Occupations: Singer, musician, songwriter
- Instruments: Vocals, guitar
- Member of: Shihad

Jonathan Charles Toogood (born 9 August 1971) is a New Zealand musician who was the frontman (lead vocals and guitar) of the rock band Shihad. He started playing guitar when he was "8 or 9" and became friends with Tom Larkin while at Wellington High School. Toogood and Larkin were fans of AC/DC and Metallica and started Shihad in 1988.

== Non-Shihad projects ==
=== SML (mid-1990s) ===
After their respective bands were established on Wildside Records Toogood, Larkin, and Nigel Reagan (Head Like a Hole) had a side project called SML. They recorded two albums in The Stench Room studio, titled Is That It? and Mixdown released in 1995 and 1996.

=== The Adults (2009–2012 and 2014–2018) ===
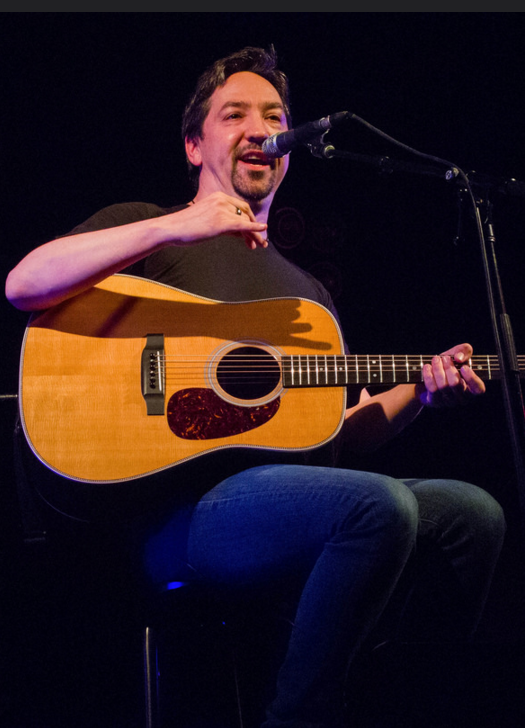
Toogood performing in Auckland, October 2015

In 2009, Toogood revealed he had been travelling around New Zealand to collaborate with other New Zealand artists for a project that is "extra-curricular" to Shihad's music. Collaborators included Tiki Taane, Ruban and Kody Neilson from the Mint Chicks, Julia Deans from Fur Patrol, Anika Moa, Shayne Carter of Dimmer/Straitjacket Fits fame and Ladi 6. The Adults was released as a full-length album in New Zealand in June 2011. Toogood subsequently toured New Zealand and Australia under this banner, joined onstage by Deans and Carter.

A second Adults album featured entirely different (musicians other than Toogood). Haja combined New Zealand hip hop and Aghani Al-Banat music from Sudan. Toogood encountered Aghani Al-Banat, which translates as "women's music", in 2014 as part of his wedding ceremony in his wife's home country. Haja was released in 2018 and reached #14 on the national album charts. Toogood's main musical contribution is on bass guitar, and he also sings on two songs. He hadn't originally intended for it to be released as "The Adults", but his record company offered more support for the project if it carried this name.

In 2018, Toogood completed a master of fine arts degree at Massey University, with a thesis on Aghani Al-Banat music. In 2020 Toogood was inducted into Massey University's College of Creative Arts' hall of fame.

=== 2020–2024: Come Together and Last of the Lonely Gods ===
Toogood is a key player in Come Together, a changing New Zealand supergroup that covers classic rock in live shows around the country. The group has recreated eight albums in their entirety:

- Abbey Road by The Beatles (2020)
- Brothers in Arms by Dire Straits (2020)
- Making Movies by Dire Straits (2023)
- Rumours by Fleetwood Mac (2023)
- Goodbye Yellow Brick Road by Elton John (2021)
- Damn the Torpedoes by Tom Petty and the Heartbreakers
- Harvest by Neil Young (2023)
- Live Rust by Neil Young (2020)

Come Together's "End of Year Bash" tours of 2023 and 2024 did away with full album play-throughs and instead are celebrations of what Toogood calls "the greatest rock songs".

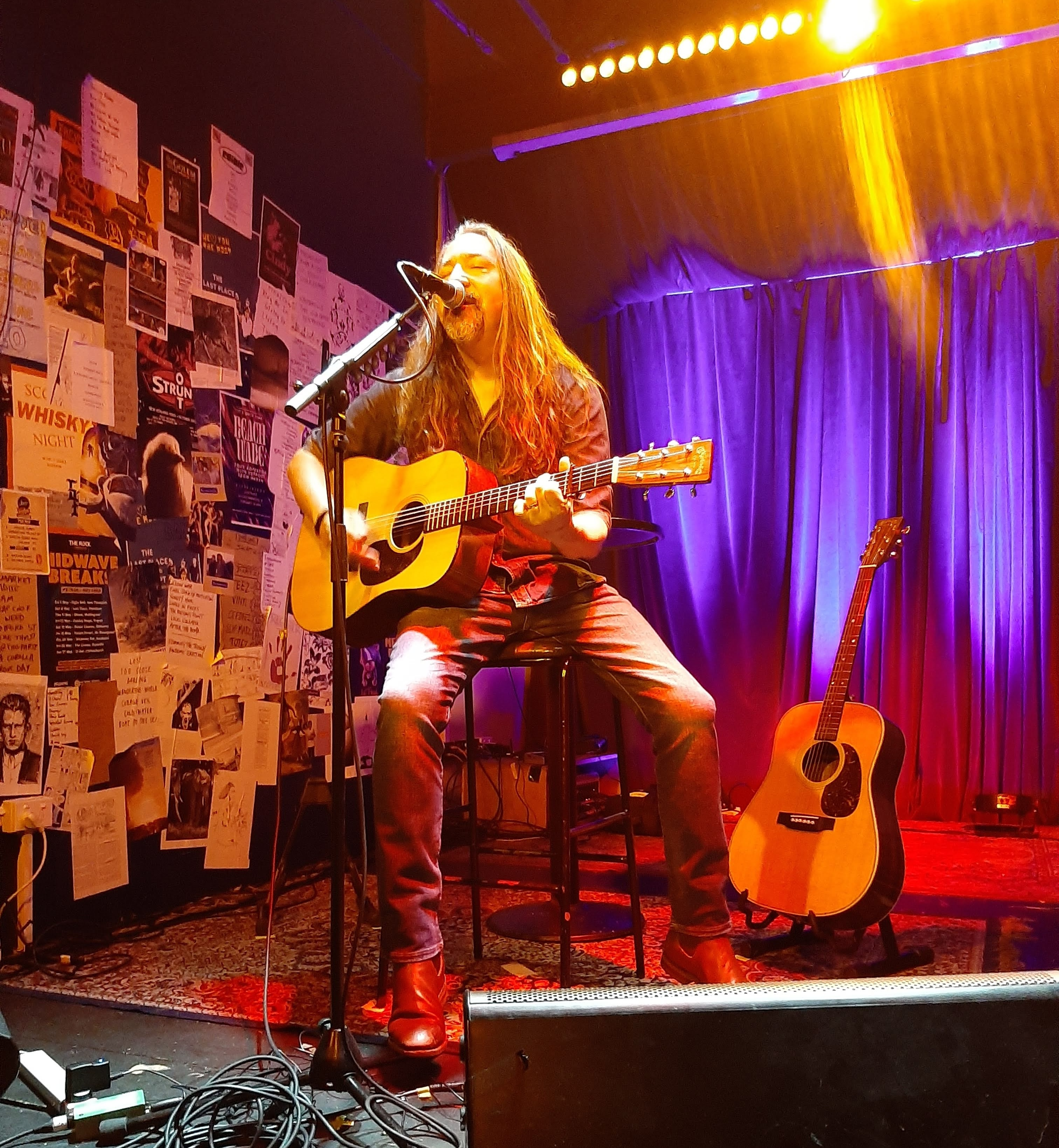
Jon Toogood playing a solo show at Last Place Bar, Hamilton, New Zealand, on 7 November 2024.

Toogood's debut solo album, Last of the Lonely Gods, was released in 2024. Played on acoustic guitar, the songs were inspired by years of what he called "personal carnage". This included a 2021 COVID-19 lockdown in Melbourne preventing him from seeing his mother before she died, a later lockdown in Wellington stranding him away from his wife and children while he lived with his sister and dying brother-in-law, and then a COVID infection leaving him with severe tinnitus that prevented him from sleeping and led to panic attacks.

The album's songwriting began after a cognitive behavioural therapist suggested that Toogood play guitar as a mindfulness exercise, which helped alleviate his tinnitus symptoms and anxiety. It was released in October 2024.

== Personal life ==
Toogood's parents migrated from England to New Zealand in the 1950s. His mother comes from an Ashkenazi Jewish family that changed its name during World War II. He has described his parents as "very egalitarian".

Toogood was a keen cricket player in high school, and at one stage captained the Wellington secondary schools' representative cricket team.

As of April 2005 Toogood was married to Ronise Paul, with whom he had a stepdaughter. In 2008 they moved to Melbourne where the rest of Shihad already lived. The marriage, which Toogood later described as making him "miserable", lasted until his step-daughter was 18.

In 2014 Toogood married second wife Dana Salih, who is a Sudanese Muslim, in Sudan. Toogood had converted to Islam prior to the wedding but only spoke publicly about his religion after 2019's Christchurch mosque shootings. They have two children.

== Awards ==
=== Aotearoa Music Awards ===
The Aotearoa Music Awards (previously known as New Zealand Music Awards (NZMA)) are an annual awards night celebrating excellence in New Zealand music and have been presented annually since 1965.

| Year | Nominee / work | Award | Result | Ref. |
|---|---|---|---|---|
| 1992 | Jon Toogood – Shihad | Most Promising Male | Nominated | |
| 1994 | Jon Toogood – Shihad | Male Vocalist of the Year | Nominated | |
| 1996 | Jon Toogood – Shihad | Male Vocalist of the Year | Won | |
| 1997 | Karl Kippenberger & Jon Toogood for Shihad | Album Cover of the Year | Nominated | |
| 1997 | Jon Toogood – Shihad | Male Vocalist of the Year | Nominated | |
| 1998 | Jon Toogood – Shihad | Male Vocalist of the Year | Won | |
| 2000 | Jon Toogood – Shihad | Male Vocalist of the Year | Won | |
| 2001 | Jon Toogood – Shihad | Male Vocalist of the Year | Nominated | |
| 2010 | Jon Toogood (as part of Shihad) | New Zealand Music Hall of Fame | inductee | |
