= List of compositions by Leo Sowerby =

The following is a list of compositions by Leo Sowerby.

== Choral ==
=== Cantatas ===
- A Liturgy of Hope (selections from the Psalms) (1917)
- The Vision of Sir Launfal (poem of James Russell Lowell (1925)
- Forsaken of Man (Passion setting, adapted from the Gospels by Edward Borgers) (1939)
- The Canticle of the Sun (St Francis of Assisi) (1944), mentioned above
- The Throne of God (Book of Revelation) (1956)

=== Anthems ===
- "Ad te levavi animam meam"
- "Behold, O God our Defender"
- "Christians, to the Paschal Victim"
- "Come, Holy Ghost, our souls inspire"
- "I was glad when they said unto me"
- "I will lift up mine eyes"
- "Love came down at Christmas"
- "Thy Word is a lantern" (in memory of President John F. Kennedy)

== Organ ==
=== Solo ===
- Carillon (1917)
- Symphony in G (1930)
- Pageant (1931)
- Prelude on "The King's Majesty" (1945)
- Canon, Chacony, & Fugue (1948)
- Ten Preludes on Hymn Tunes (1950s, published by H.W. Gray in 1956, includes Deus tuorum militum, Sine nomine, St. Dunstan's, Capel, Song 46, St. Patrick, Were you there?, Land of rest, Charterhouse, and Ad perennis vitae fontem)
- Sinfonia Brevis (1965)
- Passacaglia (1967)

=== With other instruments ===
- Organ concerto (1938)
- Toccata on 'A.G.O.' for organ, brass and timpani
- Festival Musick for organ, brass and timpani
- Classic concerto for organ and orchestra (1944)
- Mediæval Poem for organ, vocalist and orchestra
- Concertpiece for organ and orchestra, (1951)

== Orchestra & other instruments ==
- Violin Concerto, premiered 1913, revised 1924
- A Set of Four: A Suite of Ironics, published in 1931
- Five Symphonies
- Concert overture for orchestra
- Harp Concerto
- Passacaglia (1964) for carillon

== Chamber music ==
- Violin sonatas in A major, B♭ major and D major
- Vello sonata
- Viola sonata (playable on clarinet or viola)
- Piano Trio in C♯ minor
- Serenade for string quartet in G major published 1921
- Wind Quintet published in 1931
- Piano Sonata
- Passacaglia for piano
