= Gabriel Asaad =

Assyrian musician (1907 – 1997)

Gabriel Asaad ܓܒܪܐܝܠ ܐܣܥܕ
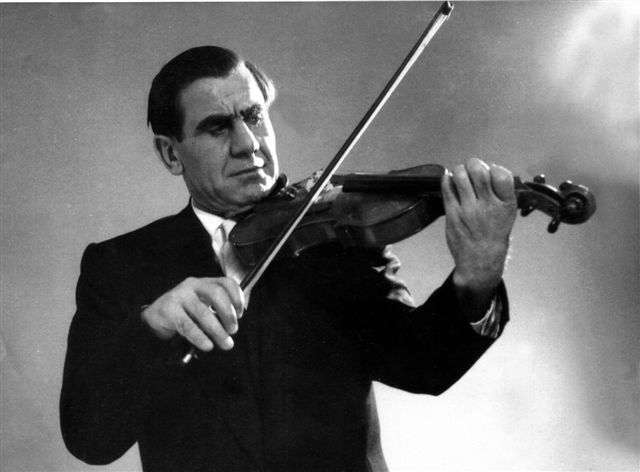
- Gabriel Asaad in 1962
- Born: March 18, 1907; Midyat, Ottoman Empire
- Died: July 6, 1997 (aged 90); Stockholm, Sweden
- Known for: Composer and Assyrian nationalist

Gabriel Asaad (Syriac: ܓܒܪܐܝܠ ܐܣܥܕ) (March 18, 1907 – July 6, 1997), also spelled Gabriel Assad, was an Assyrian composer, musician and nationalist. Born in Midyat to a Syriac Orthodox family, his family moved to Adana before the Assyrian genocide, where he studied languages at the Taw Mim Semkath orphanage. His experience at the orphanage would later inspire him to pursue a career in music, which had never been pursued in his family before.

Inspired by Assyrian nationalistic activities, which he began in Syria, Asaad is considered a pioneer in modern Assyrian folk-pop music. In the 1920s, he composed the first song in Surayt (Turoyo), and from then on, he would travel across West Asia performing music. In Syria, he continued his activities as the musical director of a cultural center in Qamishli, where he would teach and play with other rising musicians.

Asaad moved to Sweden in 1979, and lived there until his death in 1997. Today, he is retrospectively regarded as a master in Assyrian music and a popular hero among Western Assyrians and musicians.

== Early life ==
Asaad was born in Midyat in the Ottoman Empire on March 18, 1907, to a Syriac Orthodox family. His surname was derived from his father, while his "official" surname was "Some". For work reasons, in 1914, his family moved to Adana in Cilicia, and Asaad was enrolled at the Taw Mim Semkath orphanage school. He studied languages under Philoxenos Yuhanon Dolabani, and then settled in the Syrian capital of Damascus in 1921.

In Syria, Asaad's father worked as a merchant. Though he aspired a musical education, work as a musician was frowned upon among the Syriac Orthodox at the time. Although nobody had ever pursued music in his family before, his parents did not object to his wishes of becoming a musician. His years at Taw Mim Semkath would influence his passion for Assyrian identity and music, with his early inspiration from Syriac Orthodox hymns, as well as his education on Assyrian history.

== Career ==
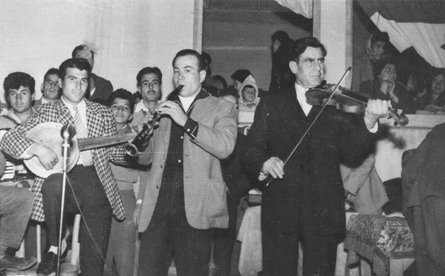
Asaad playing the violin alongside Serop Yaqub (clarinet) and Aram Tigran (jumbush) in Qamishli, c. 1960's.

In 1926, Asaad moved to the Lebanese capital of Beirut and began to play the violin as his choice of instrument. It was there that he composed his first song, "Othuroye Ho Mtoth Elfan l-Metba'" (Syriac: ܐܬܘܪܝܶܐ ܗܐ ܡܛܬ ܐܠܦܢ ܠܡܛܒܥ, lit. 'Assyrians, our Ship is Sinking'). The song is considered to be the first song ever composed in Surayt. Between 1931 and 1936, he lived in Mandatory Palestine, composing and performing more music, including two pieces commemorating the Simele massacre (Sohde Othur, Syriac: ܣܗܕܐ ܕܐܬܘܪ). During his stay there, Asaad performed music with many Arab artists such as Marie Jubran and Saleh Abdel Hai. He moved to Qamishli in 1937.

Asaad began nationalistic activities with music making in Syria, where he aimed to cause a revolution with music. In 1953, Asaad wrote a book about music, titled "From Our Modern Music," containing 13 of his works. Six years later, in 1958, found work as a musical director in a cultural center in Qamishli to continue his work. As Arab nationalism began to rise in Syria, Asaad's book was censured and only thirteen of his thirty songs could be published. At the same time, he took great notice of the trend of Ignatius Aphrem I's (then-patriarch of the Syriac Orthodox Church) stance against Assyrian identity, as everything named "Assyrian" was changed to "Syrian." Asaad appeared to maintain a stance of neutrality in the divide between the Syriac Orthodox Church and the Assyrian Democratic Organization during this time.

Asaad briefly led a scout celebration featuring fellow Assyrian musician Ninib Lahdo playing the cümbüş. During this timeframe, Asaad was also giving musical lessons to younger Assyrian musicians such as Gabi Shimun, Joseph Malke, and Fuad Ispir. Originally, Asaad was considered to compose poems by Danho Dahho such as "Shamo mar" (Syriac: ܫܡܐ ܡܪܝ), but rejected the composition since he mostly composed songs in Classical Syriac and preferred to compose serious, nationalistic songs. The song would eventually be given to Habib Mousa and recorded in August 1968. Other songs that Asaad worked on include "Ho Donho Shemsho" (Syriac: ܗܐ ܕܢܚܐ ܫܡܫܐ, lit. 'The Sun is Shining'), "Motho rḥimto nisho dil" (Syriac: ܡܬܐ ܪܚܝܡܬܐ ܢܝܫܐ ܕܝܠܝ, lit. 'My beloved nation is my goal'), "Monaw kuoro" (Syriac: ܡܢܘ ܟܘܐܪܐ, romanized: Who is the blind person?) and "Moth Beth-Nahrin" (Syriac: ܡܬܝ ܒܝܬܢܗܪܝܢ, lit. 'Mesopotamia, My Nation').

Like with other musicians such as Nouri Iskandar and Joseph Malke, Asaad maintained that Syriac chant and sacral music was rooted in pre-Christian origins influenced by the surrounding region. He published a book titled "The Syrian Music Throughout History" (Arabic: الموسيقى السورية عبر التاريخ), which documented musical nodes and an ancient Syriac musical scale. His last song, Ema G-ḥozena Shlomo? ("When will we see peace?) was recorded in 1984.

== Personal life and death ==
Asaad's son Sardanapal was encouraged to take up fine arts and studied music with his help. He moved to Sweden in 1979 where he would stay for the rest of his life, before he passed on July 6, 1997 at the age of 90.

Asaad was cousins with Ghattas Danho Maqdisi Elias, and composed one of his anthems, Taw Netkanaš, into music.

== Legacy ==
Asaad, like other Assyrian nationalists such as Naum Faiq, regarded music and poetry as being a means of uniting people. When asked about the developments of Assyrian folk-pop music, Asaad remarked that he was proud that it could now be played freely without issues. He is remembered as a pioneer and as the leading composer for West Assyrian music during the 1930s and 40s. Asaad's music also created a backbone for identity among Assyrians in Sweden as associations began building up activities. His work is also regarded as a conquest for taking back Assyrian folk-pop music from the realm of the church, who restricted its adherents from composing music.

Asaad's compositions have since been documented by his son Sardanapal, and his compositions have become a standard among Assyrians today. In 2006, a collection of his work was released in Sweden on a CD titled "An Assyrian Music Pioneer". His legacy was additionally carried on by other musicians in the Western Assyrian community, including Iskandar and Mousa.

== See also ==
- List of Assyrian musicians
- Assyrian folk-pop music

== Bibliography ==
- Akbaş, Arif (September 30, 2023). "Orta Doğu Müziğine Sosyolojik Bir Bakış" [A Sociological Look at Middle Eastern Music]. Turkish Academic Research Review. 8 (3): 1099. doi:10.30622/tarr.1298509. eISSN 2602-2923 – via DergiPark.
- Atto, Naures (2011). Hostages in the Homeland, Orphans in the Diaspora: Identity Discourses Among the Assyrian/Syriac Elites in the European Diaspora (PDF). Leiden University Press.
- Jarjour, Tala (May 24, 2018). Sense and Sadness: Syriac Chant in Aleppo. Oxford University Press. doi:10.1093/oso/9780190635251.001.0001. ISBN 9780190635299.
- Lundberg, Dan (December 1, 1998). "Welcome to Assyria – your land on the Cyber Space: Music and the Internet in the establishment of a transnational Assyrian identity". Etnomusikologian vuosikirja. 10. Finland: 13–28. doi:10.23985/evk.101081.
- Lundberg, Dan (2009). "Translocal Communities: Music as an Identity Marker in the Assyrian Diaspora". Music in Motion. Transcript Verlag. pp. 153–172. doi:10.1515/9783839410745-009. ISBN 978-3-8376-1074-1.
- Makko, Aryo (July 19, 2017). "The Assyrian "concept of unity" after Seyfo" (PDF). In Travis, Hannibal (ed.). The Assyrian Genocide: Cultural and Political Legacies (1st ed.). London. pp. 239–253. doi:10.4324/9781315269832. ISBN 9781315269832.
- Zeitoune, Abboud (2016). Music Heritage of Mesopotamia. Assyrischer Jugendverband Mitteleuropa e.V. ISBN 978-3-00-053601-4.
