= Whispers in a Dream =

Song by Hayley Westenra

from the album Paradiso
- Released: 18 April 2011
- Recorded: 2010
- Genre: Classical
- Length: 4:27
- Label: Universal Decca
- Songwriter(s): Hayley Westenra
- Producer(s): Ennio Morricone

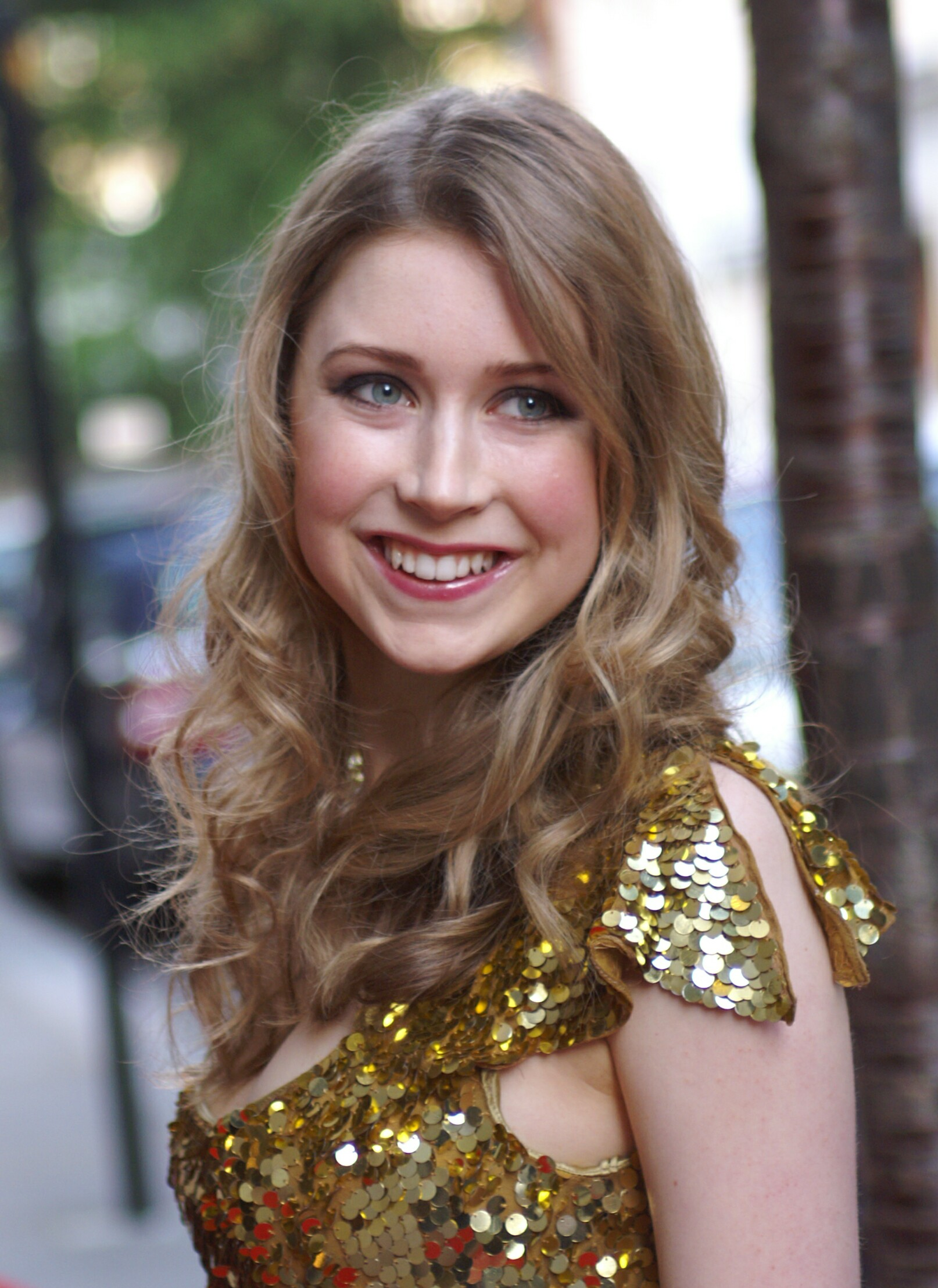
Hayley Westenra

"Whispers in a Dream" is a Christian hymn, written in 2011, by Christchurch Anglican soprano and songwriter, Hayley Westenra. It was recorded as the first song on the international album Paradiso. It was released worldwide on 18 April 2011, beginning with New Zealand.

== Background ==
Speaking about the hymn, Westenra mentioned in some interviews that she was not only inspired by "Gabriel's Oboe" (the theme from the 1986 film The Mission), but also contributed lyrics to "Whispers In A Dream", with her genuine wish for world peace. The tune of the hymn was written by Italian composer Ennio Morricone.

== International performing ==
On 17 July 2011, classical singer Hayley Westenra talked about cooperation with world-renowned composers in Paradiso, when she was interviewed by Terry Wogan, and performed live for a BBC Radio 2 program, with the track "Whispers In A Dream". On 1 September, Premier Christian Radio interviewed Westenra about recording Paradiso with Morricone and an orchestra in Rome. On 15 September, Westenra appeared as a guest star on the popular Italian reality TV show for children, "Io Canto" (Canale 5), and sang "Whispers In A Dream" with last year's winner, Benedetta Caretta. In October, BBC programme Songs of Praise broadcast a performance of "Whispers In A Dream" by Westenra in Salisbury Cathedral. On 5 December 2011 Westenra performed "Whispers In A Dream" on the Royal Variety Performance show, in the presence of The Princess Royal. During the Paradiso Homecoming Tour, Westenra performed "Whispers In A Dream" in concert, traveling to New Zealand, eastern Asia, and the United Kingdom.
