= Juliana Jendo discography =

Discography of Assyrian musician Juliana Jendo

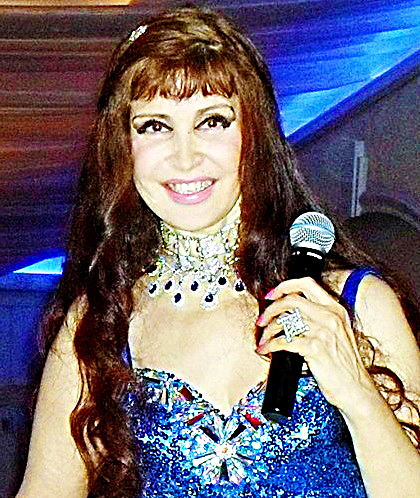
- Studio albums: 11
- Live albums: 2
- Singles: 11

Juliana Jendo is an Assyrian singer and performer originally from Tel Tamer, Syria. Over the course of a career spanning more than 30 years, she has released numerous albums and singles. Jendo is known for her versatility, performing in a variety of dialects including Sureth, Turoyo, and, occasionally, Arabic.

Her debut album, Mardita, was released in 1986. Since then, she has remained an active figure in the Assyrian music scene.

== Albums ==
=== Studio albums ===
Mardita (1986)
No.	Title	Lyrics	Length
1.	"Mardita"	Ninos Nirari	4:08
2.	"Matenie"	Ninos Nirari	4:39
3.	"Jwanqa Shoharana"	Ninos Nirari	6:24
4.	"La Parpellet"	Ninos Nirari	6:24
5.	"Aineh Kharshaneh"	Ninos Nirari	4:43
6.	"Jowanqa Manileh"	Ninos Nirari	5:34
7.	"Shopat D Edatoukh"	Ninos Nirari	5:33
8.	"Sapar"	Ninos Nirari	6:00

Khater Aynatukh (1988)
No.	Title	Lyrics	Music	Length
1.	"Khatir Ainatokh"	Wardia Jendo	Ashoor Baba	6:39
2.	"Syamando"	Yatron Darmo	Ashoor Baba	6:26
3.	"Aoueleh"	Shimon Barkho	Ashoor Baba	4:14
4.	"Shqouly Rekhqa"	Shimon Barkho	Ashoor Baba	4:39
5.	"Breeneh D Khouba (feat. Raad Zaia)"	Miriam Odisho	Ashoor Baba	6:34
6.	"Guliana"	Emmanuel Georges	Ashoor Baba	4:15
7.	"Nineveh"	Adam Homeh	Ashoor Baba	6:04
8.	"La Zaloukh"	Isaac Alqoushi	Ashoor Baba	4:56
9.	"Bar Panjara"	Ninos Nirari	Ashoor Baba	4:33
10.	"Beriyeh"	Peter Sana	Ashoor Baba	5:01

Love & Dance (1990)
No.	Title	Lyrics	Music	Length
1.	"Derdee"	Edwar Mousa	Ashoor Baba	4:38
2.	"Khloula"	Edwar Mousa	Ashoor Baba	4:08
3.	"Barda ("Ana Bratet Matwateh")"	Nazeh Baba	Ashoor Baba	6:38
4.	"Minshoqta"	Esho Sarkis	Ashoor Baba	5:05
5.	"Spara"	Esho Sarkis	Ashoor Baba	4:03
6.	"Sogoul"	Edwar Mousa	Ashoor Baba	3:50
7.	"Rawaya"	Orahim Lazar	Ashoor Baba	4:28
8.	"Jouanqa"	Amanowel Skandar	Ashoor Baba	4:55
9.	"Tlibee"	Edwar Mousa	Ashoor Baba	3:46
10.	"Nani"	Anwar Abraham	Ashoor Baba	5:07

Wardeh Deesheh (1993)
No.	Title	Lyrics	Music	Length
1.	"Zowaa Kasheera"	Ashur Bet Sargis	William Shlemoon	5:44
2.	"La Ya Libbee La"	John Homeh	Sarmen Arissian	5:05
3.	"Wardeh Deesheh" (Song from the movie Wardeh Deesheh)	Adam Homeh	William Shlemoon	7:42
4.	"Bandee"	Edward Moshe	William Shlemoon	7:53
5.	"Bereethan"	Edward Moshe	William Shlemoon	5:18
6.	"Leh Shoqinnakh"	John Homeh	Sarmen Arissian	5:40
7.	"Khon Elee"	Samir Shabela	William Shlemoon	5:19
8.	"Krohmanlokh Habib"	George Shamoon	Prof. Joseph Malkeh	7:52
9.	"Ishtar O Tamouz"	Hanna Gergo	Prof. Joseph Malkeh	6:17
10.	"Athraythee"	George Faraje	Prof. Joseph Malkeh	5:03
11.	"Bourja D Babel"	Atallah Gevargis	William Shlemoon	5:10
12.	"Mkheleh Kha Pokha"	Yatroon Darmo	William Shlemoon	7:21

Beble D-Atur (The Flowers of Assyria) (1994)
No.	Title	Lyrics	Music	Length
1.	"Leileh Kol Watan Yemma"	John Homeh		3:31
2.	"Allep Beit"	John Homeh	Joseph Malki	3:35
3.	"Tateh"	John Homeh	Joseph Malki	3:05
4.	"Choo Choo"	Lida Lawendo	Lida Lawendo	3:30
5.	"Tawalyata D Sorota"	Yosip Rehana	Yosip Rehana	4:00
6.	"Bet Yalda"	Helen Lazar		3:21

Athro Halyo (Turoyo album) (1995)
No.	Title	Lyrics	Music	Length
1.	"Athro Halyo"	George Shamoun	Joseph Malki	4:32
2.	"Lo Lalyo Lalyo"	George Shamoun	Joseph Malki	6:16
3.	"Laime Du Football"	George Shamoun	Joseph Malki	5:18
4.	"Tur Abdin"	George Shamoun	Fawzi Al Kass	5:43
5.	"Shalio"	George Shamoun	Fawzi Al Kass	6:46
6.	"Tokh Matfina"	George Shamoun	Fawzi Al Kass	6:46
7.	"Laibi Tayona"	George Shamoun	Joseph Malki	4:26
8.	"Gol Gol"	George Shamoun	Joseph Malki	5:57

Asheq D-Matwatan (1998)
No.	Title	Lyrics	Music	Length
1.	"Narneh & Hal-hallan"	Ramzee Ballo & Edward Moushe	Edward Moushe	8:24
2.	"Mathenee"	George Shanko	John Dashto	13:17
3.	"Ashek D Mathouathan"	Yousif Shikwana	William Malko
4.	"Odisho"	Ramzee Ballo	John Dashto	8:30
5.	"Nala"	Ameer Younan	Ameer Younan	3:58
6.	"Saskani"	Yousif Shikwana		3:32
7.	"Mendo"	Shlemoun Kasha		5:27
8.	"Janderma"	Ramzee Ballo	William Malko	5:58
9.	"Senjaneh Sayada"	Ramzee Ballo, Sargon Esha	Sargon Esha	9:39
10.	"Marou"	Edward Moushe	Edward Moushe	3:24
11.	"Habewee"	Samir Shablla	Samir Shablla	6:40

Mellati (2003)
No.	Title	Length
1.	"Alqosh Araden"	11:29
2.	"Halla Eedokh"	16:00
3.	"Shara, Garbeya, Zakho"	14:36
4.	"Pokheh Rameh"	8:44
5.	"Tel Tamar"	16:16
6.	"Shimma D Khobba"	4:09

Elemo Halyo (Turoyo album) (2008)
No.	Title	Lyrics	Length
1.	"Elemo Halyo"	George Shamoun	8:13
2.	"Emo Hlitho"	George Shamoun	6:27
3.	"Midyad"	George Shamoun	4:02
4.	"Twaro Aqayde"	George Shamoun	7:46
5.	"Dmakh Habibo"	George Shamoun	7:14
6.	"Zmirothokh"	George Shamoun	4:56
7.	"Gilgamesh"	George Shamoun	6:27
8.	"Gawriye" (Song noted as Turoyo version)	George Shamoun	5:39
9.	"Sargon Halyo"	George Shamoun	7:05

Tel Kepeh (Sureth and Arabic album) (2008)
No.	Title	Length
1.	"Tel-Kepeh"	7:24
2.	"Ana-Mamnoun (feat. Rafid Sawa)"	5:49
3.	"Iraqi Soccer"	6:13
4.	"Chobia"	10:05
5.	"Ya Taer"	5:02
6.	"Tannoura"	5:49
7.	"Bagiye"	9:39
8.	"Ana Habaytak"	4:50
9.	"Rah-Llbasra"	6:04

Golden Tunes (2010)
No.	Title	Lyrics	Length
1.	"Shtranta"	Amir Younan	7:24
2.	"Akko"	Dawod Barkho	3:20
3.	"Diri Dakhta Hokee"		7:41
4.	"Barwari" (Dedicated to Barwari)	Dawod Barkho	4:51
5.	"Gaorlyeh"	Dawod Barkho	5:27
6.	"Chicago"	Amir Younan	5:34
7.	"Yalda"	Dawod Barkho	3:30
8.	"M.De.Syria"	Fahed Issak	7:55
9.	"Khmathie"	Dawod Barkho	4:20
10.	"Saskanie"	Farmo Markos	4:40
11.	"Slow"	Dawod Barkho	6:35
12.	"Gubare"	Ramzy Ballo	8:34
13.	"Groushla Eedie"	Ninos Aho	8:50

=== Live albums ===
Juliana Live: 3 CDs (2011)
No.	Title	Length

Studio Live (feat. Tony Gabriel) (2018)
No.	Title	Length

== Singles ==
Title	Release
"Taliboota"	2015
"Brekha Ethokhon"	2018
"Go Qaploukh Babi"	2021
"Mdalal Qalbi" (Arabic song)	2021
"Taloukh Baby" (ft. Kynexx Obimba)	2022
"Aweleh"	2022
"Alqoshnaya"	2023
"Jwanqa Shetrana"	2023
"Aha Khouba"	2024
"A Tribute to Tel Keppe"	2024 (Note: This song is a cover of Josef Ozer’s “Ahna Kulan Suryoye” dedicated to the village of Tel Keppe, sung in Sureth)
"Laylee"	2024
"Go Matan"	2025
"Al Henna"	2025
"Zyaptet Khetna"	2025

== Other appearances ==
=== Guest appearances ===
Year	Album	Artist
1987	Yemma	Janan Sawa
1988	Maliktit Khoolmany (Queen of My Dreams)	Geliana Esho
1991	Ktawa	George Homeh
1992	Tekhsaro	Shabeh Lawando
1993	Simele	Simon Kaplo
1995	Hala Ey Bayinakh	Manuel Simon
1999	Broony	Janan Sawa
2009	Ishtar	Janan Sawa
2010	Akh Babo	Issam Arabo
2011	Kasreh Rameh	Lazar Malko
2011	Zapileh	Shabeh Lawando
2012	Wardeh Ma'Arwaye	Shabeh Lawando
2014	Tarat Babo	Rama Younan
2016	Mahnahyet D'khoba	Sandy Rekany
2018	Qessat D'Khoba	Nuwell Benyamin
2024	Champs Élysées	Stuart Benyamin
