= Leon Stein =

American classical composer

Leon Stein (September 18, 1910 in Chicago – May 9, 2002 in Laguna Hills, California) was an American composer and music analyst.

Stein attended DePaul University, where he achieved his MM in 1935 and his Ph.D. in 1949; he studied under Leo Sowerby, Eric DeLamarter, Frederick Stock, and Hans Lange. He taught at DePaul from 1931 to 1978; he was dean of the School of Music there between 1966 and 1976. Stein was also Director of the Graduate Division at De Paul University of Music. College of Jewish Studies, Chicago. He directed a number of Chicago ensembles, including the City Symphony of Chicago.

Stein's compositions were modernist in character; his works for saxophone are his most popular pieces. He also wrote on music, particularly Jewish music. His manuscripts are held in the Richardson Library at DePaul.

He has two sons.

== Books ==
- The Racial Thinking of Richard Wagner (1950)
- Structure and Style: The Study and Analysis of Musical Forms (1962, 3rd ed. 1979)
- Anthology of Musical Forms (1962)

== Music ==
Stage

- The Fisherman’s Wife (1954)
- Deirdre (1955)
- 2 early ballets

Orchestral

- Violin Concerto (1939)
- 3 Hassidic Dances (1940–41)
- Symphony No. 1 (1940)
- Symphony No. 2 (1942)
- Triptych on 3 Poems of Walt Whitman (1943)
- Symphony No.3 (1950–51)
- Rhapsody (1954)
- Then Shall the Dust Return (1971)
- Symphony No. 4 (1974)
- Cello Concerto (1977)
- Concerto for clarinet and percussion (1979)

Chamber/solo

- Sonata for violin and piano (1932)
- String Quartet No. 1 (1933)
- Woodwind Quintet (1936)
- Invocation and Dance (1938)
- Quintet for saxophone and string quartet (1957)
- Sextet (1958)
- Violin Sonata (1960)
- Trio for Three B♭ Trumpets (or B♭ Clarinets) (1958)
- Trio for Saxophone, violin, and piano, (1961)
- String Quartet No. 2 (1962)
- String Quartet No. 3 (1964)
- String Quartet No. 4 (1965)
- Sonata for tenor sax and piano (1967)
- String Quartet No.5 (1967)
- Suite for saxophone quartet (1967)
- Sonata for Solo Viola (1969)
- Suite for wind quintet (1970)
- Sonata for Solo Bass (1970)
- Brass Quintet (1975)
- Duo Concertante for viola and cello (1978)
- Suite for string trio (1980)
- Three for Nine (1982)
- other works for solo instruments and keyboard

Vocal

- Liederkranz of Jewish Folksongs (1936)
- The Lord Reigneth (1953)
- other religious choral works to Hebrew and English texts
