= Hush-a-bye =

Hush-a-bye or Hushabye may refer to:

- "Hushabye", a song recorded by The Mystics
- Hushabye (album), by Hayley Westenra
- "All the Pretty Little Horses", a lullaby also called "Hush-a-bye"
- "Rock-a-bye Baby", a lullaby also called "Hush-a-bye"
