= Eric DeLamarter =

American classical composer

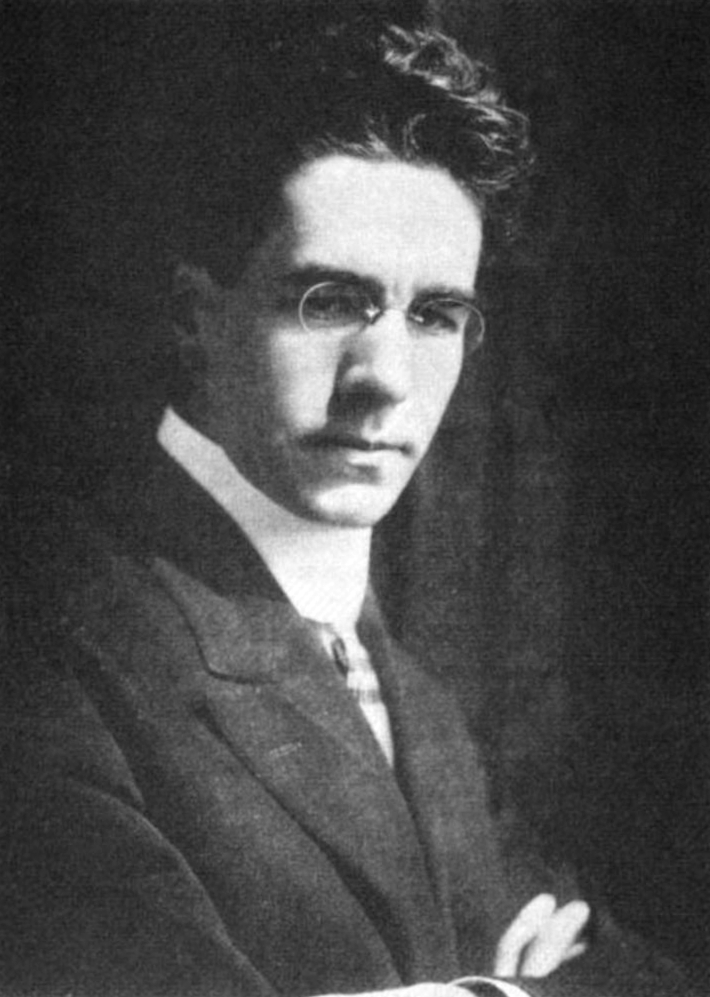
- Born: February 18, 1880; Lansing, Michigan
- Died: May 17, 1953 (aged 73); Orlando, Florida
- Education: Albion College
- Occupations: Composer, organist
- Spouse: Margaret Healy
- Children: 2

Eric DeLamarter (February 18, 1880 – May 17, 1953) was an American composer and classical organist.

== Biography ==
DeLamarter's grave at Mount Hope Cemetery

Eric DeLamarter was born in Lansing, Michigan on February 18, 1880, the child of Dr. Louis and Mary B. DeLamarter. He attended public schools in Kalamazoo, then Albion College. He was a music critic for the Chicago Tribune in 1909, 1910, 1915, and 1916.

He served as assistant conductor of the Chicago Symphony Orchestra from 1918 to 1933 and from 1933 to 1936 he served as their associate conductor. He was also an uncredited orchestra conductor in the 1946 film Humoresque.

Among his pupils was Leon Stein.

Eric DeLamarter was a composer, church organist, and music and drama critic of The Inter Ocean. He was also a close friend and adviser to Leo Sowerby as well as a champion of Sowerby's music. DeLamarter aided Sowerby in his becoming an accomplished organist. In 1915 he was organist at the Fourth Presbyterian Church in Chicago, IL. The following year he commissioned and gave the premiere performance of Sowerby's Comes Autumn Time.

He died in Orlando, Florida on May 17, 1953. He was buried at Mount Hope Cemetery in Lansing.

The Lila Acheson Wallace Library of The Juilliard School has several of his holographs as well as printed items. The University of Michigan Library holds the holograph of his organ concerto and a number of printed items.
