= Joseph Malke =

Syrian musician (1948–2014)

Joseph Malke ܝܘܣܦ ܡܠܟܝ
- Born: 1948; Qamishli, Syria
- Died: 18 April 2014 (aged 65–66) Sweden
- Genres: Assyrian folk-pop music
- Occupations: Musician, composer
- Years active: 1968–2014

Joseph Gergis Malke Khuri (sometimes Malki; Syriac: ܝܘܣܦ ܡܠܟܝ) (1948 – 18 April 2014) was a Syrian musician. Born to a family originally from Midyat, he studied music from an early age, beginning his career in the 1960s composing Assyrian songs. Later, he would move to Sweden where he founded the Assyrian National Federation and bring Sweden's Assyrian community together through music and dance.

Malke is considered to be one of the most well known Assyrian musicians, having a significant impact on the development of Assyrian folk-pop music in the 20th century. Throughout his career, he composed songs for various other Assyrian musicians, and argued for the right of Assyrians to make music.

== Early life and beginnings ==
Joseph Gergis Malke Khuri was born in the Syrian city of Qamishli in 1948, to a family originally from Midyat in southeastern Turkey. In his youth, he studied music with the Syriac Scout Band where he played the saxophone. He began studying music in the early 1960s under the direction of Hasan al-Turk, and played with a big brass band alongside other musicians; he would later continue to play saxophone with the same musicians under the direction of Gabriel Asaad.

Around this time, music making among Assyrians was still considered taboo due to the belief that the Syriac language was sacred. Malke and Abrohom Lahdo tried to convince some poets to write songs, but their efforts proved futile. In 1967, Malke composed his first song, "Rhimto d'leb" (Syriac: ܪܚܝܡܬܐ ܕܠܒܝ), which was written by Abrohom Lahdo and recorded by both Jalil Maiilo and Ninib Lahdo. In the same year, he composed the song "Grishla Idi" (Syriac: ܓܪܫ ܠܗ ܐܝܕܝ), written by Chabo Bahé in 1962. He would follow after by composing "Thet Lamfido" (Syriac: ܬܬ ܠܡܦܝܕܐ), written by Hanna Lahdo.

== Career ==
In 1968, Malke's professional career would begin when he moved to Damascus and played with the city's radio orchestra. While in Damascus, he worked professionally as a musician in night clubs. In the early 1970s, Malke studied to become a film director in Spain, where afterwards he migrated to Sweden in 1971. During this time, he organized parties in cities where Assyrians lived such as Motala, Linköping, and Gothenburg. Malke was also one of the founders of the Assyrian National Federation in Sweden, and utilized music to bring people together as many were abstinent to the idea of founding the Federation. In 1975, he founded the Babylon Music Group with Afram Asaad, George Sawma, and brothers Boutros and Simon Hadrouli; the group would play on Swedish national television in 1977.

Malke assisted with production of the first Swedish-Assyrian LP-disc, "Azzen Azzen" (Syriac: ܐܙܝܢ ܐܙܝܢ), sung by Ninib Lahdo. Throughout the 1980s, Malke would lead many of the musical initiatives in the Assyrian National Federation as its music director. He played and composed music for albums recorded by Sardanapal Asaad, Mona Betros, Fuad Ispir, and Jacob Melki. Over the years, Malki was also a music teacher, and taught students which included members of the Qenneshrin music group.

Malke, much like his successor Gabriel Asaad, emphasized the importance of the Syriac Orthodox Church in the history of Assyrian music. However, while Asaad emphasized influences from Western music, Malke insisted on using characteristics of Arabic and Turkish music due to their roots in the church. In an interview from 1997, Malke stated:

We have a musical legacy which goes back to the time before the Turks. Our ancestors sang this music. So these maqams existed. We know that Mar Afrem the Great and Bar Daisan taught these maqams, these scales in the church music, to pupils in Antioch and in Edessa and Nsi bin (which is called Diyarbakir today) as early as the 11th century.

In his later years, Malke began to collect nursery rhymes and set existing texts to music. He had previously released two children songs' cassettes in 1980 and 1983 with the Ishtar Music Group. One of his tunes, "Alap Beth" (Syriac: ܐܠܦ ܒܝܬ), became a song sung by Juliana Jendo in her album The Flowers of Assyria. In 2003, Malke produced a video cassette of children's songs which contained subtitles in Swedish.

Malke's songs have been sung by a range of different Assyrian musicians, including Fuad Ispir, Jalil Maiilo, Ninib Lahdo, Jacob Malki, Boutros Hadrouli, among others. He additionally composed a song performed by Juliana Jendo, "Laime du Football", in support of Assyriska FF. In 2007, Malke was honored by the Assyrian Democratic Organization during their 50th anniversary celebration in Sweden. In 2009, Syriac Music held a concert in Södertälje paying tribute to Malke, featuring performances from Ninib Lahdo, Fuad Ispir, and Pascal Touma.

== Death and legacy ==
Malke died on 18 April 2014, at aged 65, in Sweden. Later in June, a memorial concert for Malke was organized by various Assyrian associations in Sweden.

Malke is considered to be one of the most well known Western Assyrian musicians alongside Nouri Iskandar and Habib Mousa, as well as the first professional Assyrian musician in Sweden. Abboud Zeitoune writes that "Malke's contribution in the field of the Assyrian music sustained continuously from the early sunrise of the folk songs in second half of the 1960's until now." In an interview from 1997, Malke stated that if it were not for music, he would not have been able organize Assyrians in Sweden in the 1970s. In his career, he provided arguments for the Assyrians' right to music.

== Bibliography ==
- Lundberg, Dan (1 December 1998). "Welcome to Assyria – your land on the Cyber Space: Music and the Internet in the establishment of a transnational Assyrian identity". Etnomusikologian Vuosikirja. 10. Finland: 13–28. doi:10.23985/evk.101081.
- Lundberg, Dan (2009). "Translocal Communities: Music as an Identity Marker in the Assyrian Diaspora". Music in Motion (PDF). Transcript Verlag. pp. 153–172. doi:10.1515/9783839410745-009. ISBN 978-3-8376-1074-1.
- Zeitoune, Abboud (2007). Music pearls of Beth-Nahrin: an Assyrian/Syriac discography (PDF). Wiesbaden, Germany. p. 548. ISBN 978-3931358099.
