= John Kelsall =

British composer and conductor (1947–1986)

John Lawrence Kelsall (31 July 1947 – 4 November 1986) was a British composer, conductor and lecturer.

== Studies ==
Kelsall was born in East Retford and studied composition, piano and organ at Aberdeen University, gaining an MA, with composition a major part of his final submission. His PhD (Compositional Techniques in the Music of Stockhausen (1951–1970)) was completed at Glasgow University in 1975. He completed a Cert. Ed in 1975 and was awarded the FLCM in Composition in 1979. He wrote a considerable amount of sacred and secular repertoire for choir and organ, and numerous chamber works.

== Academic work ==
Kelsall was a lecturer at Kingston Polytechnic, now Kingston University, from 1977 until his untimely death in 1986. He founded the Polytechnic's Chamber Choir, becoming its first director, composing for the group and establishing a demanding calendar of concerts and cathedral residencies. The Chamber Choir under Kelsall became one of the Polytechnic's premier ensembles, performing at major venues up and down the UK, as well as giving a Purcell Room performance.

He died in Kingston-upon-Thames on 4 November 1986, aged 39.

Much of Kelsall's output has remained unjustly neglected since his death. Kelsall's music is currently edited and published by Ben Costello.

On Monday 28 July 2008 the John Kelsall Memorial Recital took place at St Michael's, Cornhill, London, given by the resident organist and Director of Music Jonathan Rennert.

== The School of Music, Kingston Polytechnic ==
Throughout the late 1970s and early 1980s the Music Centre at Kingston Polytechnic was offering a BA Hons Mus Ed degree (CNAA), designed to develop the wider range of skills required in music education, with an emphasis on combining academic and practical aspects of music-making.

Other courses were offered including a one-year post-graduate/post-diploma course, a BEd Hons (CNAA) course, a BEd in-service course for teachers already in the profession, and supervision of approved research for MPhil and PhD (CNAA).

A wide variety of ensembles were available for the students to partake in, and the Music Centre was situated (as it is today) in an elegant Regency mansion set in extensive grounds adjacent to Richmond Park. The professional ensembles based at the Music Centre included the Medici Quartet and the London Sinfonietta, and the International Society for the Study of Tension in Performance was also established at the Music Centre.

After Kelsall's death in 1986, the Chamber Choir was directed by Peter Johnson until his move to Birmingham Conservatoire in 1990.

== John Kelsall Retrospective ==
This event celebrating the life and work of John Kelsall and directed by Ben Costello, took place at St. Andrew's Church, Surbiton, Surrey, England, on Saturday, 4 November 2006. It marked the exact twenty-year anniversary of Kelsall's death, which occurred on 4 November 1986. Choral Evensong led by the Reverend Val Cory was followed by a reception and a brief panel discussion regarding Kelsall's life and work. The evening concluded with a short chamber concert featuring a selection of Kelsall's secular works.

=== Choral evensong ===
Introit: Kelsall – Eternal God, we look to thee (1979); Preces and Responses: Kelsall (Fourth Set, 1979); Canticles: Kelsall – Magnificat (1986) and Nunc Dimittis (Kelsall/Costello, 2006); Psalm 22: Chants by S. S. Wesley, B. Costello and J. Kelsall; Anthem: Kelsall – I call with my whole heart (1969); Organ Voluntary: Kelsall – Rhapsody No. 3 (1986)

The choirs of St Andrew and St Mark, Surbiton, and guests, members of the Clerkes of Old Sarum, members of Kingston Chamber Singers. Organist – Simon Harvey. Choirmaster – Ben Costello

=== Panel discussion ===
Speakers: Peter Johnson, John Bate, Ben Costello

=== Chamber concert ===
Yes (1978), Sonata for Bassoon and Piano (1978), Three Miniatures (1979), Prelude and Fugue (1979)

Performers: Heather Keens (soprano), Victoria Medcalf (bass clarinet), Ingrid Pearson (clarinet), Neil Strachan (bassoon), Julia Crowell (flute), Mary Parker (flute), Roger Beeson (piano), Ben Costello (piano)

== Works by John Kelsall ==
=== Original choral works ===
- Ave plena gracia (unacc. anthem for Tr solo and SATB)

Text: 15th Century; Anon / Completed: unknown (revised on 25 August 1973)

- Bless ye the Lord! (anthem for SATB and organ)

Text: from the Benedicite / Completed: 14 September 1982

- Burning Babe, The (unacc. carol-anthem for SATB with divisions)

Text: Robert Southwell / Completed: 1985 (published by Oecumuse in 1985) / Commissioned by the John Bate Choir (now Thames Philharmonic Choir)

- Canite tuba in Sion (unacc. anthem for SATB with divisions)

Completed: unknown

- Christus factus est (unacc. anthem for trebles)

Completed: 1978

- Dove Descending, The (Anthem for Pentecost) (unacc. anthem with divisions)

Text: T S Eliot / Completed: 1983

- Ecce, Agnus Dei (unacc. setting and solos, with some divisions) / Completed: 29 September 1970
- Easter Past (unacc. anthem with divisions)

Text: I Corinthians vs. 15 and 20, and Wie Schön Leuchtet / Completed: 1986

- Epsom Mass (setting for congregation, SATB and organ)

Text: ICET Text (adapted) / Completed: 1985

- Eternal God, we look to Thee (unacc. anthem for SATB with divisions)

Text: Gloria, with poem of 1763 by James Merrick (1720–69) / Completed: 24 January 1979

- First Shorter Litany, The (unacc. setting for SATB with divisions) / Completed: unknown
- I call with my whole heart (unacc. anthem for SATB with divisions)

Text: from Psalm 119 (office of None) / Completed: 1 May 1969 (Aberdeen)

- I sing of a myden (unacc. anthem for solos and SATB)

Text: Early 15th Century (slms 2593) to be sung in Middle English / Completed: 24 October 1969

- I will lift up mine eyes (unacc. anthem for SATB with some divisions)

Text: From Psalm 121 / Completed: unknown

- Jesus Christ the Apple Tree (1st version) (unacc. S solo and SATB with divisions)

Text: “Divine Hymns” compiled by J. Smith, USA, 1784 / Completed: 1980

- Jesus Christ the Apple Tree (2nd version) (unacc. S solo and SATB)

Text: “Divine Hymns” compiled by J. Smith, USA, 1784 / Completed: 1980

- Jubilate Deo (anthem for SATB choir and organ)

Completed: 1970 (MA submission) May to June 1969, revised September 1969.

- Like as the hart desireth the waterbrooks (anthem for SATB with divisions and organ)

Text: from Psalm 42 / Composed: March 1969 (Aberdeen, Scotland)

- Love Came Down at Christmas (carol for SATB with divisions and organ)

Text: Christina Rossetti / Completed: 5 October 1975

- Magnificat (SATB with divisions and organ)

Completed: 19 September 1986

- Mass (St Alban’s Mass) (unison setting for choir and organ of the Rite A Communion Service)

Completed: 1981

- Matin Responsory (First Responsory) (unacc. SATB)

Completed: unknown

- Matin Responsory (Responsory of Mattins) (unacc. SATB with divisions)

Completed: unknown

- Matin Responsory (St Dunstan’s) (unacc. SATB)

Completed: unknown

- Missa Brevis (unacc. SMA soloists and choir with multiple divisions)

Text: Latin Mass / Completed: 1978

- Missa Super Hodie Beata Virgo Maria (unacc. SATB for Candlemas)
- Noctem Quietam (Benediction) (unacc. anthem for S solo and double SATB choir)

Completed: 16 May 1974

- Nunc Dimittis (unacc. SSAATB)

Completed: April 1979

- Nunc Dimittis Written to partner the Magnificat of 1986 (setting for baritone solo, SATB with divisions and organ)

Music: Ben Costello, after John Kelsall / Completed: August 2006

- Preces and Responses in E (Nuthall) 1st set (setting for unacc. SATB with divisions)

Text: BCP / Completed: 24 June 1967 (Nuthall)

- Preces and Responses (Festal) 2nd set (setting for unacc. SSATB with occasional divisions)

Text: BCP / Completed: 1972

- Preces and Responses (Ferial) 3rd set (setting for unacc. SATB)

Text: BCP / Completed: unknown

- Preces and Responses (Festal) 4th set (setting for unacc. SSATB with occasional divisions)

Text: BCP / Completed: 1979

- Prothalamion (unacc. anthem for SATB with divisions)

Text: I Corinthians 13 (vs. 11 – 13) / Completed: 24 January 1984

- Psalm Chant in C (Double Chant for SATB)
- Rex Pacificus (unacc. anthem for SATB with divisions)

Text: late 15th Century, from Trinity College, Cambridge MS 0.3.58 (adapted) / Completed: 1982

- Save us, Lord (unacc. short anthem for SATB with occasional divisions)

Completed: 1963

- Set me as a seal upon thy heart (unacc. anthem for soprano solo and five-part choir)

Text: The Song of Songs Ch. 8 vs. 6 and 7 / Completed: 14 January 1980

- Song for Fidele (Cymbeline) (anthem for accompanied SATB with divisions)

Text: Shakespeare / Completed: 18 July 1983

- Sursum Corda (setting for unacc. TTBB)

Words: Christina Rossetti / Composed: 1985

- Thre Kingés (unacc. carol-anthem for soprano solo and SAB)

Text: National Library of Scotland Ms. Advocates 193.1; f.59a / Completed on 26 December 1983

- Veni Creator Spiritus (unacc. short introit for SATB with occasional divisions)

Text: attrib. Rabanus Maurus (776–856) / Completed: 7 December 1974

- Virgin’s Lullaby, The (carol for two-part choir, with two treble recorders and ‘cello (flutes or descant recorders may be substituted, ‘cello may be substituted for euphonium)) / Text: from William Ballet's Lute Book, 17th Century, Mss in Trinity Coll., Dublin / Completed: 2 September 1969 (Nuthall, Nottingham)

=== Choral arrangements ===
- Little Jesus (Rocking) (unacc. anthem for SATBaB with divisions)

Music: Traditional Czech Christmas carol / Text: Shawn Colvin / Arranged: 1981

- My Dancing Day (anthem for SATB with divisions and organ)

Music: Traditional / Text: Traditional 16th Century / Arranged: 1976

- Infant King, The (unacc. carol for SSAA)

Music: Basque Noel / Text: S. Baring-Gould / Arranged: unknown

- Lord’s Prayer, The (unacc. setting for SATB)

Music: Maurice Duruflé (orig. F major) / Text: The Lord's Prayer / Arranged: c. 1979

- Scarborough Fair / Canticle (unacc. song for SATB with optional treble recorder)

Music: Traditional/Paul Simon / Arranged: 1976

- Sussex Carol, The (carol for double SATB choir with some divisions and organ)

Music: Traditional / Melody and Text from Mrs Verrall, Monk's Gate, Sussex / Arrangement started on 22 October 1984 and completed on 3 November 1984

- Sweet was the song the Virgin sang (carol for SATB with occasional divisions and organ)

Music: 16th Century Anon (collected from British Library Egerton 2971 and British Library Add MSS 17786-17791 / Text: Anon / Arrangement completed on 3 December 1985

=== Instrumental works ===
- Sonatas and Variations (fl, ob, cl, bsn)

Completed: 1 December 1977

- Variations for two bassoons (2 bsn)

Completed: 1978

- Variations for violin with piano (vn, pF)

Completed: unknown (Piano part missing)

- Caprice (piano duet)

Completed: 1970 (MA submission)

- Cold Angel – Overture for Orchestra (2 (1), 2, 2, 2; 2, 2; tps; str (multiple divisions))

Completed: Kingston-upon-Thames 27 July 1979

- Copula (vc, gtr)

Completed: 1978

- Dal Nacimiento (sop, 2 fl, 2 vc, 2 org, vib, mar, various perc.)

Text: Romance IX – San Juan de la Cruz / Completed: 15 October 1982

- Prelude and Fugue (pF)

Completed: April 1979

- Romance (hn and pF)

Completed: 1983

- Rhapsody No.1 (org)

Completed: 1983

- Rhapsody No.2 (org)

Completed: 15 March 1986

- Rhapsody No.3 (org)

Completed: 1 July 1986

- Serenade (brass quintet)

Completed: 29 June (?) 1983

- Sonata for Bassoon and Piano (bsn, pF)

Completed: 1978

- Three Miniatures (ob or fl)

Completed: 2 September 1979

- Triptych (string quartet)

Completed: Easter 1970 (MA Aberdeen submission)

- Toccata in D (org)

Completed: 1985

=== Instrumental works with voice ===
- Metamorphoses XIII (sop, bar, rec, choir, tape and small ensemble)

Text: Anne Muir (b. 1948)

- Yes (m-s, fl, cl, bass cl)

Text: words taken from the closing lines of Joyce's Ulysses (1914–1921) / Completed: 1978

- Three songs for mezzo-soprano (m-s solo, 2 fl (dbl. picc.), 2 bs, 2 cl, alt sx, ten sx, 2 tpts, 2 tbn, elec. piano, perc.)

Text: Various / Completed: Christmas 1978

- Rosemoundé (soprano and small ensemble)
- Sunwards (alt, fl, ob, 2 bsn)

Text: George Mackay Brown / Completed: 23 March 1978

- Three Songs for Feste (voice, fl)

Text: Shakespeare / Completed: 27 August 1979

=== Editions ===
- Thomas Ebdon – Responses (1756–1811)

Edited by John Kelsall in 1982 Sacred music composed for the use of the choir of Durham (1790–1811) (p. 104 BL: I.219)

- William Smith (of Durham) – Preces and Responses

Edited by John Kelsall in 1978

- Daniel Purcell – Ode to Saint Cecilia

Edited by John Kelsall in 1978

- Orlande de Lassus (c.1530–1594) – Missa Super Osculetur Me (1582)

Edited by John Kelsall in 1986

- Orlande de Lassus – Ne reminiscaris, Domine (Munich, 1577)

Edited by John Kelsall in 1984

(List correct as at March 2025.)
