= Paradiso (Hayley Westenra album) =

Studio album by Hayley Westenra and Ennio Morricone
- Released: 18 April 2011
- Recorded: 2010
- Genre: Classical, traditional music
- Length: 58:23
- Label: Decca, Universal
- Producer: Ennio Morricone

Hayley Westenra chronology
Winter Magic (2009)	Paradiso (2011)	Hushabye (2013)

Ennio Morricone chronology
Come Un Delfino (2011)	Paradiso (2011)

Paradiso is a studio album by New Zealand soprano Hayley Westenra, in collaboration with Italian maestro Ennio Morricone. It was released worldwide beginning 18 April 2011 in New Zealand.

Paradiso features new compositions written by Morricone for Westenra, as well as Westenra performing some of his best-known film compositions in vocalese. Westenra also contributed new English lyrics for some of Morricone's most well-known pieces, such as "Gabriel's Oboe", "La Califfa", and "Malena". Westenra said she not only was inspired by "Gabriel's Oboe" (the theme from the 1986 film classic The Mission), but also contributed lyrics to "Whispers In A Dream" (music: "Gabriel's Oboe") in the spirit of world peace.

Morricone produced all of Westenra's vocal performances and created new arrangements for each track, conducting instrumental sessions with his own 120-piece orchestra, Sinfonietta di Roma. On 18 July 2011, Morricone commented, "When I first heard Hayley’s voice I was impressed and fascinated. I was very pleased when I was asked to compose and arrange the pieces that Hayley sings on her CD and am delighted with the results. I want to mention that this is not just a small anthology but also includes new songs performed and recorded for the first time... I wish our CD great fortune and many listeners and to this beautiful performer, a great career." Oscar-winning lyricist Don Black, Sir Tim Rice, and Marilyn and Alan Bergman also contributed lyrics to the multi-language album (including some English and Italian songs, a French and a Portuguese song).

Paradiso became the 85th local number 1 album since the inception of the Official New Zealand Music Charts in 1975. It has been certified gold in New Zealand, and became Westenra's fifth number one album in New Zealand, breaking the record for the New Zealand artist with the most number 1 albums.

Paradiso hit number 1 on the official UK Classical Charts, as well as the Classic FM chart, after its release in the UK.

== Track listing ==
1. "Gabriel's Oboe (Whispers In A Dream)" - lyrics by Hayley Westenra
2. "Cinema Paradiso: Profumo Di Limone" - lyrics by Ennio Morricone
3. "La Califfa" - lyrics by Ennio Morricone & Hayley Westenra
4. "Once Upon A Time In The West" - lyrics by Ennio Morricone
5. "Metti Una Sera A Cena" - lyrics by Ennio Morricone
6. "Cinema Paradiso: Would He Even Know Me Now?" - lyrics by Don Black
7. "Per Natale (L'Esprit de Noël)" - lyrics by Josephine Drai
8. "I Knew I Loved You (Deborah's Theme)" - lyrics by Ennio Morricone, Alan Bergman & Marilyn Bergman
9. "Lezione Di Musica" - lyrics by Ennio Morricone
10. "Da Quel Sorriso Che Non Ride Piu" - lyrics by Ennio Morricone
11. "The Edge Of Love" - lyrics by Tim Rice
12. "Amália Por Amor" - lyrics by Joao Mendonca
13. "Here's To You" - lyrics by Joan Baez
14. "Malena" - lyrics by Hayley Westenra

Japan Release:

1. "Gabriel's Oboe (Whispers In A Dream)" - lyrics by Hayley Westenra
2. "Cinema Paradiso: Profumo Di Limone" - lyrics by Ennio Morricone
3. "La Califfa" - lyrics by Ennio Morricone & Hayley Westenra
4. "Once Upon A Time In The West" - lyrics by Ennio Morricone
5. "Metti Una Sera A Cena" - lyrics by Ennio Morricone
6. "Cinema Paradiso: Would He Even Know Me Now?" - lyrics by Don Black
7. "Per Natale (L'Esprit de Noël)" - lyrics by Josephine Drai
8. "I Knew I Loved You (Deborah's Theme)" - lyrics by Ennio Morricone, Alan Bergman & Marilyn Bergman
9. "Lezione Di Musica" - lyrics by Ennio Morricone
10. "Da Quel Sorriso Che Non Ride Piu" - lyrics by Ennio Morricone
11. "The Edge Of Love" - lyrics by Tim Rice
12. "Amália Por Amor" - lyrics by Joao Mendonca
13. "Here's To You" - lyrics by Joan Baez
14. "Malena" - lyrics by Hayley Westenra
15. "Cinema Paradiso: Profumo Di Limone (Bonus Track)" - [Japanese Lyrics]
16. "Amazing Grace" (Special Bonus Track)

Disc 2 [SHM-CD Special Edition]

1. "Gabriel's Oboe (Whispers In A Dream)" Music Video

== Promotion ==
On 17 July 2011, Westenra talked about working with world-renowned composers on Paradiso when interviewed by Terry Wogan, and performed "Whispers In A Dream" and "Songbird" live for BBC Radio 2. On 1 September, Premier Christian Radio interviewed Westenra about recording Paradiso with Morricone and his orchestra in Rome. On 15 September, Westenra appeared as a guest star on the Italian reality TV show for children Io Canto and sang "Whispers In A Dream" and "Cinema Paradiso: Profumo di Limone" with the show's 2010 winner, Benedetta Caretta. The BBC programme Songs of Praise broadcast "Whispers In A Dream" as performed by Westenra in Salisbury Cathedral. Westenra was also interviewed by several American media outlets, including Fox News, to promote the album's release in the United States. On 17 October, Westenra appeared on CNN for an interview entitled "Prodigy Puts Words to Morricone's Classics".

== Paradiso Homecoming Tour ==
To promote and spread Paradiso, Westenra announced her plan to embark on the Paradiso Homecoming Tour, a tour of the UK, New Zealand, and east Asia.

== Charts and Certifications ==
=== Charts ===
Chart (2011)	Peak position
Australian Top 100 Physical Album Chart	81
Australian Classical Album Chart	2
Irish Albums Chart	66
Irish Classical Album Chart	1
New Zealand Albums Chart	1
New Zealand Classical Music Chart	1
UK Albums Chart	13
UK Classical Album Chart	1
Taiwan Classical Album Chart	1
US Billboard Classical Albums Chart	7

=== Certifications ===
Region	Certification	Certified units/sales
New Zealand (RMNZ)	Gold	7,500^{^}
^{^} Shipments figures based on certification alone.

== International Release ==
Region	Date	Label	Format	Source
New Zealand	18 April 2011	Decca	CD	
Japan	8 June 2011	Universal Music Japan	CD/DVD	
Australia	10 June 2011	Universal	CD	
Portugal	28 August 2011	Decca	CD	
United Kingdom	29 August 2011	Decca	CD	
Canada	29 August 2011	Universal	CD	
Russia	29 August 2011	Decca	CD	
Spain	29 August 2011	Decca	CD	
Germany	30 August 2011	Decca	CD/MP3-Downloads	
France	30 August 2011	Decca	CD/MP3-Downloads	
TaiWan	31 August 2011	Decca	CD	
Italy	20 September 2011	Decca	CD	
United States	29 August (for DD) /4 October 2011 (for CD)	Decca	CD/Digital Download	
China	October 2011	Decca	CD	
