= Philoxenos Yuhanon Dolabani =

Syriac Orthodox metropolitan of Mardin

- Metropolitan of the Diocese of Mardin
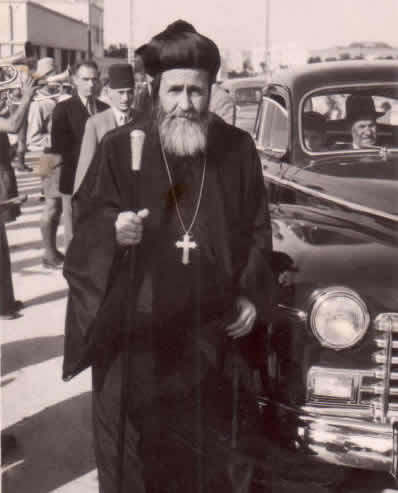
- Dolabani arriving in Aleppo after his ordination in May 1947
- Native name: ܦܝܠܘܟܣܝܢܘܣ ܝܘܚܢܢ ܕܘܠܒܐܢܝ
- See: Diocese of Mardin
- In office: 1947—1969
- Previous post: Priest

Orders
- Ordination: 1918

Personal details
- Born: 27 September 1885 Mardin, Ottoman Empire
- Died: 1969 (aged 83–84) Mardin, Republic of Turkey
- Buried: Mor Hananyo Monastery

Sainthood
- Venerated in: Syriac Orthodox Church of Antioch

Mor Philoxenos Yuhanon Dolabani (Syriac: ܦܝܠܘܟܣܝܢܘܣ ܝܘܚܢܐ ܕܘܠܐܒܐܢܝ; 1885–1969), also known as Philoxenos Yuhanon Dolabani or simply Yuhanon Dolabani, was the Syriac Orthodox Metropolitan of Mardin, Turkey, and its Environs. Born in Mardin, he became interested in becoming a monk in the early 20th century, to which his parents objected at first. He was ordained in the Mor Hananyo Monastery in 1908, and later as a bishop in 1933. In 1947, he was ordained Metropolitan of Mardin.

Dolabani authored many works throughout his life, and is acclaimed as a prominent Syriac writer to this day. Over the course of his life, he published as many as 69 books, including 10 translations, and had overseen control of publishing materials from his residence in Mardin. He is known to have also composed many poems, including Assyrian nationalist ones, which he was later forbidden from writing or expressing due to conflict with Syriac Orthodox clergymen. Despite these issues, Dolabani stuck to his ideals and continued to express Assyrian identity.

Many Assyrians have cited Dolabani as an influential figure of the 20th century, and praise him for his works as well as his nationalism. As a teacher of Syriac in the Taw Mim Semkath orphanage, he taught many figures who would later become prominent in the Assyrian community. In 2007, a biography about Dolabani was published that included his writing and poetry.

== Early life ==
Dolabani was born in Mardin on 27 September 1885 to a religious family that came to the city from Savur in the 18th century. At the age of six, he attended school at the Forty Martyrs Church, learning a variety of different subjects. He attended the local Turkish school, and after he finished his education, he resided across different monasteries in Mardin and Tur Abdin. Originally, Dolabani embarked on a shoe-making career, and his parents did not want him to become a monk. Although Ignatius Abded Aloho II had tried to convince Dolabani to forget about monastic life at the request of his parents, it was unsuccessful.

In 1908, Dolabani became a monk in the Mor Hananyo Monastery, where he resided for the majority of his life. He became a teacher in the monastery's Patriarchal School in 1910, and was ordained a priest in 1918.

== Religious work ==
At the Taw Mim Semkath orphanage school, Dolabani taught Syriac and Arabic to students until its closure in 1921. Among the students he taught at the orphanage include Gabriel Asaad, Abrohom Sawma, Athanasius Yeshue Samuel, and Danho Maqdasi Elias. Dolabani also taught those who would later become clergymen such as Abed Mshiho Neman Qarabashi, Murad Saliba Barsoum, and Nu'man Aydin, and frequented education at various monasteries. Dolabani frequently wrote to different places in order to request financial aid for Taw Mim Semkath, and according to Nicholas Al-Jeloo, his instruction in Syriac fueled many prominent writers and luminaries.

Dolabani accompanied Ignatius Elias III on a pastoral tour across the Middle East in 1919 after Sayfo, and later attended another visit in 1925 to Aleppo and Jerusalem. On 4 December 1921, he attended the ceremony for the Treaty of Ankara (1921) at Adana, and visited various Turkish officials afterwards to negotiate for the release of the treasurer of Taw Mim Semkath. Dolabani departed for Aleppo in 1922 following increased persecution against the remaining Christians in Adana, but relocated to Beirut to teach Syriac at the re-established orphanage, remaining there until 1926. He eventually served the Syriac Orthodox community in Jerusalem, staying at the Monastery of Saint Mark, and was later joined by Sawme from the Assyrian orphanage.

Dolabani had ordained many priests, monks and deacons to serve in remote areas as far as Bitlis and Van. In total, he made 303 appointments of individuals to clerical positions throughout his life. He was one of many clerical figures to emphasize structural reforms to propel education in the church. Dolabani was consecrated as a bishop in 1933. After Ignatius Aphrem I moved the Syriac Orthodox patriarchate from Mardin to Homs, community leadership in Mardin desired to elect Dolabani to the position of anti-patriarch, but he rejected this. He was ordained Metropolitan of the Diocese of Mardin in 1947.

== Literary works ==
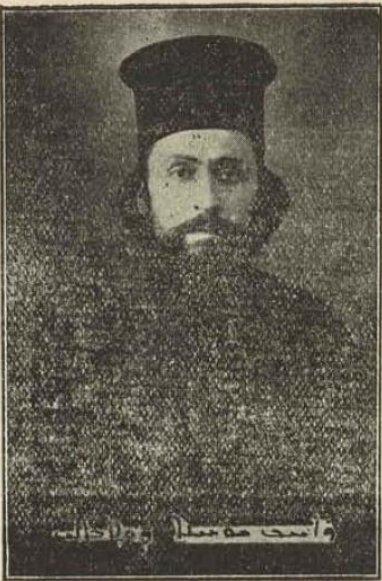
Portrait of the Monk Dolabani from 1920

Dolabani is known for his literary works which he produced throughout his life. He authored numerous works written in Syriac, Arabic, and Turkish, which namely included translations of Syriac literature and writings on history/poetry. Dolabani also wrote poems, including one dedicated to the Saffron Monastery, as well as 'culturally Assyrian' poems such as Othur (Syriac: ܐܬܘܪ). He, alongside other clerical and community figures, contributed to the Assyrian journal Sefro Suryoyo (Syriac: ܣܦܪܐ ܣܘܪܝܝܐ), which was published by the Syriac Orthodox Archdiocese of Aleppo and edited by Danho Maqdisi Elias. He also oversaw the publishing of the Hikmet journal while he was a monk at the Mor Hananyo Monastery.

In 1929, Dolabani published a book of compiled poems which included literary works by Barhebraeus. He additionally compiled a series of catalogues of manuscripts from different locations which remained unpublished until 1994, and translated Ignatius Aphrem I's book, The Scattered Pearls: A History of Syriac Science and Literature, into Syriac. Throughout most of his life, Dolabani kept a diary where he detailed daily occurrences and events in his life. In his memoirs, he describes a meeting with Isma’il Beg Chūl in 1910, suggesting that he had cordial relations with Yazidis. In total, Dolabani published 69 books, including 10 translations.

Dolabani frequently faced challenges and heavy pressure from Turkish authorities regarding his publishing opportunities, including an instance in 1949 when he applied to create a Bible study course. Records of correspondence between him and authorities show that the difficulties were so immense, including requirements of compulsory Turkish language, history, and geography classes, that he was forced to give up entirely, as he failed to make substantial progress. Dolabani was the first to translate Syriac Orthodox liturgical prayer into Turkish for those who had moved to Istanbul. When he was ordained Metropolitan in 1947, Dolabani moved the church's printing press from Mor Hananyo Monastery to the Forty Martyrs Church in Mardin.

== Views on nationalism ==
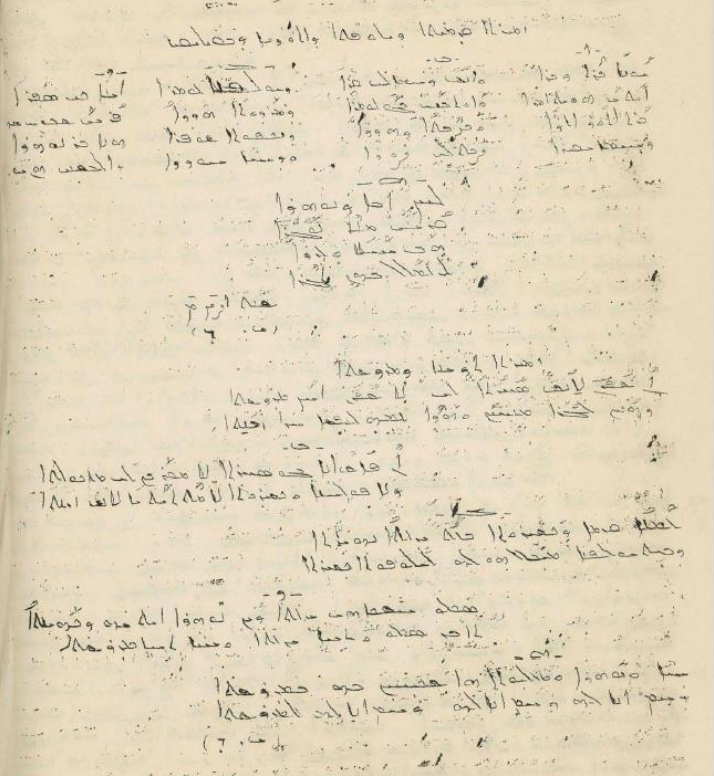
Two poems that Dolabani wrote for Taw Mim Semkath, published in the Assyrian-American periodical Babylon in 1920

Dolabani wrote many poems inspired by Assyrian heritage and identity, most of them being composed in Adana. Additional poems that he wrote include Neshono d'Othur (Syriac: ܢܨܚܢܐ ܕܐܬܘܪ; the poem was sung at Taw Mim Semkath) and Yolufotho d-Othuroye b-Qiliqiya (Syriac: ܝܠܘܦ̈ܬܐ ܕܐܬܘܪ̈ܝܐ ܒܩܝܠܝܩܝ, lit. 'The Students of the Assyrians in Cilicia'). In some of his poems, identification with the ancient Arameans is also present, leading to contemporary disputes and competition over his choice of identity.

After the failure of the Assyro-Chaldean delegation at the Paris Peace Conference, Dolabani was forbidden from expressing nationalistic ideals by church hierarchy. Dolabani was also reported to have been excommunicated for six months due to this reason. Although he continued to express Assyrian identity, he did so under a lower profile. In the magazine Leshono d'Umtho, Dolabani published nationalistic poems anonymously.

Dolabani was one of only two clergymen, alongside Ignatius Ya'qub III, to oppose the excommunication of Farid Nuzha by Aphrem Barsoum. His magazine continued to be sent to Dolabani even while he was excommunicated. He also criticized a tribute to Naum Faiq by bishop Murad Cheqqe, which expressed distaste towards Faiq's Assyrian activism.

== Death and legacy ==
Dolabani died in 1969. The week before his death, when he saw his last article in the Patriarchal Magazine, he said: “I’m afraid that the pen will fall out of my hand and I won’t be able to write anymore.” His funeral was reported to have been a grand event, with thousands of Assyrians from Syria taking part. He is buried in the Mor Hananyo Monastery. After his death, the Metropolitan See of Mardin remained vacant due to harsh political conditions until 2003.

Many prominent figures from the Syriac Orthodox Church fondly remembered Dolabani's humility and wisdom. Sebastian Brock, who met Dolabani when he was 28, was greatly influenced by him, and later established a memorial fund at the University of Oxford in his honor. Syriac Orthodox Archbishop Julius Yeshu Çiçek was taught by Dolabani and lived with him for three years in Mardin. In his accounts of Dolabani, he stated:

He was such a spiritual loving man, always praying. It was enough to see him, to be with him, to live with him. We were living and praying together. He was a man of God, a living example, which is better than words and long talks.

According to historian Michael Abdalla, Dolabani is considered one of the great Assyrians of the twentieth century. Khalid Dinno considered Dolabani a role model for younger generations of Syriac Orthodox Christians, especially for those from southeastern Turkey, helping to strengthen the revival of the church. In 2007, the Assyrian Federation in Sweden (Swedish: Assyriska Riksförbundet i Sverige) published a biography about Dolabani, which included his writings and poetry. A biography was published nearly a decade later by his former secretary, Elias Shahin, through the Swedish publisher Tigris Press. The Assyrian Youth Association of Central Europe in Germany (German: Assyrischer Jugendverband Mitteleuropa e.V.) has hosted Camp Dolabani, named after Dolabani, since 2010.

== Publications ==
- Dolabani, Philoxenos Yuhanon (8 October 2009). Ibrahim, Yohanna (ed.). Catalogue of the Syriac Manuscripts in St. Mark’s Monastery. Gorgias Press. ISBN 9781607242512.
- Dolabani, Philoxenos Yuhanon (6 November 2009). Ibrahim, Yohanna (ed.). Catalogue of Syriac Manuscripts in Za‘faran Monastery. Gorgias Press. doi:10.31826/9781463218546. ISBN 9781463218546.
- Dolabani, Philoxenos Yuhanon (17 January 2010). Ibrahim, Yohanna (ed.). Catalogue of Syriac Manuscripts in Syrian Churches and Monasteries. Gorgias Press. ISBN 9781607242598.
- Dolabani, Philoxenos Yuhanon (20 May 2010). A Commentary on the Mysteries. Translated by Kaplan, Clement Awgen. Gorgias Press. doi:10.31826/9781463217921. ISBN 9781463217921.
- Dolabani, Philoxenos Yuhanon, ed. (13 August 2010). A History of the Time of Persecution in Edessa, Amid, and all of Mesopotamia. Gorgias Press. doi:10.31826/9781463230685. ISBN 9781463230685.
- Dolabani, Philoxenos Yuhanon (9 September 2010). Distinct Confessions of Christ. Gorgias Press. doi:10.31826/9781463230609. ISBN 9781463230609.
- Dolabani, Philoxenos Yuhanon (30 December 2010). Fundamentals 1: Syriac Pronunciation. Gorgias Press. doi:10.31826/9781463230555. ISBN 9781463230555.
- Dolabani, Philoxenos Yuhanon (30 December 2010). Selections from the Mysteries. Translated by Kaplan, Clement Awgen. Gorgias Press. doi:10.31826/9781463230616. ISBN 9781463230616.
- Dolabani, Philoxenos Yuhanon (3 January 2011). Fundamentals 2: Grammatical Meditations. Gorgias Press. doi:10.31826/9781463230562. ISBN 9781463230562.
- Dolabani, Philoxenos Yuhanon (4 January 2011). The Life and Works of Jacob of Serug. Gorgias Press. doi:10.31826/9781463231279. ISBN 9781463231279.
- Dolabani, Philoxenos Yuhanon (12 July 2011). History of the Monastery of Mor Gabriel. Gorgias Press. doi:10.31826/9781463230739. ISBN 9781463230739.
- Ma`dani, John Bar (27 October 2011). Dolabani, Philoxenos Yuhanon (ed.). Selected Poems of John Bar Ma`dani. Gorgias Press. doi:10.31826/9781463230760. ISBN 9781463230760.
- Michael Mina, Al-Kamus (23 December 2010). Theology. Translated by Dolabani, Philoxenos Yuhanon. Gorgias Press. ISBN 9781611432060.

== Bibliography ==
- Abdalla, Michael; Kiczko, Łukasz (2021). Sayfo - An Account of the Assyrian Genocide. Edinburgh University Press. pp. xv–xxii. ISBN 9781474447522.
- Al-Jeloo, Nicholas (January 2020). "From Boston to Cilicia: The Adana Assyrian Orphanage and Ḥannā Dolabānī's Correspondence with Assyrian-American Periodical Babylon". Hikmet'in İzinde Bir Ömür, Metropolit Hanna Dolabani [A Life in the Footsteps of Hikmet, Metropolitan Hanna Dolabani]. Mardin Artuklu University. pp. 117–173.
- Atto, Naures (2011). Hostages in the Homeland, Orphans in the Diaspora: Identity Discourses Among the Assyrian/Syriac Elites in the European Diaspora (PDF). Leiden University Press.
- Aydın, Cebrail (1988). ܕܘܠܒܐܢܝ: ܩܦܝܣܐ ܕܡܘܥܝܬܗ ܘܬܪܒܝܬܗ [Dolabani BG: Metropolitan Mor Filiksinos Hanna Dolapönü's Curriculum Vitae] (in Turkish). Holland: Bar Hebraeus Verlag.
- BarAbraham, Abdulmesih; Beṯ-Şawoce, Jan (2021). "Osmanlı ve Türkiye Coğrafyası Kökenli Doğu-Batı Asur Yayın Organları" [Ottoman and Turkish Geography Origins of East-West Assyrian Publications]. Osmanlı'da Türkçe Dışı Süreli Yayınlar [Non-Turkish Periodicals in the Ottoman Empire] (in Turkish). Kebikeç Journal of Human Resources Research. pp. 297–328.
- DelCogliano, Mark (7 January 2006). Syriac Monasticism in Tur Abdin: A Present-Day Account. Vol. 41. Cistercian Studies Quarterly. pp. 341–343.
- Dinno, Khalid S (November 2018). "The Revival of the Syrian Orthodox Christians Following The First World War". Living Stones Yearbook 2017-18: Faith on Trial, Attrition and Politics in the Middle East (PDF). Living Stones of the Holy Land Trust. pp. 71–96. ISBN 978-0955208881.
- Donabed, Sargon; Mako, Shamiran (1 September 2009). "Ethno-Cultural and Religious Identity of Syrian Orthodox Christians". Revue d'Histoire de l'Université de Balamand. ISSN 1608-7526 – via SSRN.
- Gaunt, David; Atto, Naures; Barthoma, Soner O., eds. (1 May 2017). Let Them Not Return: Sayfo – The Genocide Against the Assyrian, Syriac, and Chaldean Christians in the Ottoman Empire (PDF). Berghahn Books. ISBN 978-1-78533-499-3.
- Kiraz, George A., ed. (2008). Malphono W-Rabo D-Malphone: Studies in Honor of Sebastian P. Brock. Gorgias Press (published 16 December 2008). ISBN 9781593337063.
- Önder, Josef (29 September 2025). "Literary works within the Syriac Orthodox Church of Antioch in Germany with a focus on Baden-Württemberg". In Murre-van den Berg, Heleen (ed.). Labour of Love: Text and Tradition in Contemporary Transnational Oriental Orthodoxy (PDF). Radboud University Press. pp. 114–115. doi:10.54195/utqa4903. ISBN 9789465151632.
- Sims, Michael B. (1 June 2020) [9 March 2020]. "Claiming the Ezidis (Yezidis): Nineteenth- and twentieth-century Assyrian, Kurdish and Arab sources on Ezidi religious and ethnic identity". Journal of Contemporary Iraq & the Arab World. 14 (1): 36. doi:10.1386/jciaw_00017_1. eISSN 2515-8546. ISSN 2515-8538.
