= Habib Mousa =

Syrian singer (born 1952)

Habib Mousa ܚܒܝܒ ܡܘܣܐ
- Born: 9 October 1952 (age 73); Al-Malikiyah, Syria
- Genres: Assyrian folk-pop
- Occupation: Singer
- Instrument: Vocals
- Years active: 1968–present

Habib Mousa (Syriac: ܚܒܝܒ ܡܘܣܐ; born 9 October 1952) is a Syrian musician. From an early childhood, he was interested in music until his formal career began in 1968 with the release of "Shamo Mar".

Mousa remains one of the most popular Western Assyrian musicians to date, and is referred to as the "King of the Suryoyto Song" for his influence in secular Assyrian folk-pop music. He is considered the second person to compose and sing songs in Classical Syriac (Kthbonoyo/Lishana Atiqa). His music is additionally played on Swedish Radio and has appeared on television and at parties. Alongside other musicians as Joseph Malke, he has worked to bring Assyrians together in organizations through the use of music.

== Early life ==
Mousa was born on 9 October 1952, in Al-Malikiyah, and raised in Qamishli. His family's origins are from Azakh (modern day İdil, Turkey). From his early childhood, he was enrolled in a Syriac school where he first took his inspiration for music from Syriac sacral music. At the age of ten, he was appointed as the head of his church's choir, and he would also become a deacon. Although his first language was Arabic, he eventually picked up and became fluent in Syriac.

== Career ==
Mousa's professional career began in 1968 when he produced the song "Shamo Mar" (Syriac: ܫܡܐ ܡܪܝ); the song was composed by Danho Dahho who tried to convince the Assyrian composer Gabriel Asaad to compose the song. However, Asaad rejected this as he mostly composed music in Classical Syriac. Habib Mousa was the first person chosen to record the song, being successfully recorded in August 1968. In the same year, Mousa recorded the song "Talakh Khliti Sogul d'Libbi" (Syriac: ܬܐ ܠܟܝ ܚܠܝܬܝ ܣܘܿܓܘܼܠ ܕܠܒܝ) to be incorporated in the first Western Assyrian folklore album.

Shortly after the release of "Shamo Mar", Mousa left to Beirut, Lebanon in 1969; he would later meet Assyrian composer Nouri Iskandar and they released four songs together, including "O Habibo" (Syriac: ܐܘ ܚܒܝܒܐ) and "Zliqe Frse" (Syriac: ܙܠܩ̈ܐ ܦܪܣܝ). In 1973, Mousa participated in the first modern festival of Assyrian music at the UNESCO PalaceBeirut, performing a number of Assyrian folk songs with the Lebanese musician Wadi al-Safi; the concert was arranged by Iskandar. In the same year, he performed "O Habibo" on Lebanese TV, the first TV performance ever held by a Western Assyrian musician.

While in Lebanon, the Assyrian musician Ninib Lahdo accompanied Mousa as an oud player. In 1978, Mousa recorded a few songs in Suret that were originally recorded by Oshana Youel Mirza. The same year, he released his first musical cassette in Sweden after he immigrated there, containing covers of Eastern Assyrian songs by Mirza and Albert Ruel Tamras. His first independent album since immigrating, Ninwe, was published in 1986.

In 2001, Mousa released the album Urhay, in collaboration with musicians such as Saiid Lahdo and Abrohom Lahdo. In 2010, Mousa was stopped by Ba'athist Syrian security forces from performing at celebrations of Kha b-Nisan in Qamishli; ADO sent a press release after stating that the reasons for his performance ban were politically based.

In 2015, Mousa took part in a series of concerts titled "Best of Sweden", along with Nasser Razazi, Osman Abdulrahim, Ramy Essam, and Safoura Safavi. In 2021, Mousa released his first album in 20 years, a compilation album titled 50 Years with Habib Mousa. The album was released a few years after Mousa's music began the process of digitization, and was released on Spotify and Apple Music. Aside from his official releases, Mousa has been a regular performer at several Assyrian events and parties in the past.

== Messaging in music ==
During the 1980s, Mousa was involved in competition between the Assyrer and Syrianer movements as part of the Assyrian naming dispute and naming conflict in Sweden, and felt that he was ostracized from both communities for not taking a position along either movements. Although he made a song as an attempt to compromise, those of the Syrianer movement usually do not invite him to perform.

Mousa has addressed Turkification policies that impacted Assyrian villages in Midyat. In one song, he sings about the village of Enhil, challenging actions by the government of Turkey in removing traces of the Assyrian heritage of Tur Abdin, while establishing himself and other "Enhiloye" as the village's leaders. Mousa's songs have also addressed Assyrians being forced to leave their homeland in exchange for an uncertain future.

== Discography ==
The following discography is listed on Qeenatha and from Mousa's archived website:

=== Albums ===
- Shamo Mar Vol. 1 (1968)
- Yelta Men Demmi: Assyrian Folklore (1978)
- Ninwe (1986)
- O Habibo - Collection 1971-72 (reissue) (1989)
- Mazlo Li Qritho (1990)
- Cafro D-Beth Nahrain (1995)
- Urhoy (2001)
- 50 Years with Habib Mousa (2021)

=== Singles ===
- Single Vol.2a, ‘Laymoutho w-Hubo and Lebi Kriho-Yo (1971)
- Single Vol.2b, O Habibo and Lo Tehfokh (1971)
- Single Vol.2c, Zabno Tloumo and Shlome Shlome (1971)
- Single Vol.2d, Zliqe Frisi and G-Rohmo-No O Habibaydi (1972)
- Single Vol.2e, Shamo Mar and Wardo (1972)

== Bibliography ==
- Atto, Naures (5 October 2011). Hostages in the homeland, orphans in the diaspora: identity discourses among the Assyrian/Syriac elites in the European diaspora (Doctoral thesis). Leiden University.
- Lundberg, Dan (1 December 1998). "Welcome to Assyria – your land on the Cyber Space: Music and the Internet in the establishment of a transnational Assyrian identity". Etnomusikologian Vuosikirja. 10. Finland: 13–28. doi:10.23985/evk.101081.
- Zeitoune, Abboud (2016). Music Heritage of Mesopotamia. Assyrischer Jugendverband Mitteleuropa e.V. ISBN 978-3-00-053601-4.
