= Gabriel's Oboe =

Main theme for the 1986 film The Mission

- The Mission (soundtrack)

Song
- Released: 5 August 1986
- Recorded: September 1985 – February 1986
- Genre: Soundtrack
- Length: 2:14
- Label: Virgin
- Composer: Ennio Morricone
- Producer: Ennio Morricone

"Gabriel's Oboe" is the main theme for the 1986 film The Mission, directed by Roland Joffé, starring Robert de Niro, Jeremy Irons, and Liam Neeson. The theme was written by Italian composer Ennio Morricone, and has since been arranged and performed several times by artists such as Yo-Yo Ma, Holly Gornik, and Brynjar Hoff, among others. The theme has been called "unforgettable" and a "celebrated oboe melody". Vocalist Sarah Brightman convinced Morricone to allow her to set lyrics to the theme to create her own song, "Nella fantasia". In 2010, Morricone encouraged soprano Hayley Westenra to write English lyrics for "Gabriel's Oboe" in her album Paradiso.

== Film soundtrack ==
Gabriel's Oboe
From The Mission soundtrack by Ennio Morricone

The soundtrack for the film was very well received amongst critics, being nominated for an Academy Award for Best Original Score and earning Morricone the Golden Globe Award for Best Original Score.

In the film, the theme is most prominently used when the protagonist, the Jesuit Father Gabriel, walks up to a waterfall and starts playing his oboe, aiming to befriend the natives with his music so he can carry his missionary work in the New World. The Guaraní tribesmen, who have been stalking him from a distance, approach Gabriel for the first time, puzzled by the sounds of the unknown instrument. The chief of the tribe, however, is displeased by this, and breaks Gabriel's oboe. This marks the beginning of the relationship between Father Gabriel and the Guaraní natives.

Several orchestras have performed "Gabriel's Oboe", often under the direction of Morricone himself. The most famous renditions of the piece, other than in the movie, are probably those found in the Morricone Conducts Morricone series of concerts during the mid-2000s.

== SATB choral arrangement ==
Extending the simple lyrics of the Christmas carol adaptation of Christina Rossetti's poem "Love Came Down at Christmas", Tom Fettke's SATB (soprano-alto-tenor-bass) arrangement incorporates Morricone's wind treatment as the voice of the eponymous Archangel in his piece titled The Annunciation.

== Certifications ==
Region	Certification	Certified units/sales
United Kingdom (BPI)	Silver	200,000^{‡}
^{‡} Sales+streaming figures based on certification alone.
