= Comes Autumn Time =

Concert overture by Leo Sowerby

Comes Autumn Time is a concert overture by Leo Sowerby. Originally composed for organ in October 1916, it was orchestrated the following year. The organ version was both commissioned and premiered by Eric DeLamarter at Fourth Presbyterian Church in Chicago on October 20, 1916. Because the piece was so well received, DeLamarter then asked the composer for an orchestral version, which he led in an all-Sowerby concert in Chicago in January 1917. With the score's publication in 1919 by the Boston Music Company, writes Francis Crociata of the Leo Sowerby Foundation, Comes Autumn Time was soon performed "in Boston by Pierre Monteux, Philadelphia by Stokowski, Minneapolis by Ganz, New York by Damrosch, London by Harty and Wood, Berlin by Rosbaud, and Vienna by Bruno Walter."

The piece is one of Sowerby's most popular, and was inspired by a poem by Bliss Carman entitled "Autumn". (In tribute to Carman's contribution to the piece's origin, Sowerby directed that a copy of the poem be included with every printed copy of the score, a practice which is still carried on today.) The piece became a personal favorite of Frederick Stock, then Music Director of what is now the Chicago Symphony Orchestra; upon Stock's death in 1942, the piece was played at his funeral at Stock's request.

The work opens with an exuberant and lively theme played on the bass clarinet, horns, and low strings. A transition in the woodwinds bring on the second main subject, iterated by flutes and celesta against a harp and clarinet background. The first subject is then developed, the second returning only in the recapitulation, followed by the first. The piece finishes with a brilliant and lively coda, developed from the second theme.
