= Wardeh Deesheh =

1991 Assyrian-Australian film

- ܘܪ̈ܕܐ ܕܝ݂ܫ̈ܐ
- Directed by: John Homeh
- Screenplay by: John Homeh
- Produced by: John Homeh
- Starring: Juliana Jendo; George Homeh
- Cinematography: John Homeh; Younan David
- Edited by: John Homeh
- Music by: Eshaya Nano; Rennie Daniel; George Homeh
- Production companies: Studio 46; J.H.P Sydney
- Release date: 1991
- Running time: 92 minutes
- Country: Australia
- Language: Assyrian

Wardeh Deesheh (Syriac: ܘܪ̈ܕܐ ܕܝ݂ܫ̈ܐ), transl. Trampled Flowers or Crushed Flowers), also spelled Warde Deeshe and Warde Deshe, is a 1991 Assyrian-Australian independent film written and directed by John Homeh. The film primarily features Assyrian musicians George Homeh, who is John's brother, and Juliana Jendo, and is set in both Sydney and the Assyrian homeland. (Note: For convenience and economic reasons, the substitute location for the Assyrian homeland was Sydney, Australia. Though home video footage of Assyrians in the homeland was edited in with the scenes set there.)

A straight to video romantic-drama film with musical and comedy elements, it primarily focuses on the love triangle between Nineb (George Homeh), Nineveh and Nina (Jendo, in a dual role) within an allegorical narrative. Capturing the tensions that Assyrians face living in the diaspora, the film is renowned as the first and most successful Assyrian feature length film, and for being one of the first movies in Assyrian Neo-Aramaic.

== Plot ==
The film opens with a wedding celebration in an unnamed Assyrian village in the Nineveh Plains, with villagers gathering around in traditional Assyrian clothing. The camera than pans away from the wedding to a more solemn conversation as Nineb (Homeh) and Nineveh (Jendo) say their goodbyes due to the former's immigration to Australia. Nineveh warns him that there will come a day where he regrets leaving her, his brother, and their homeland. Nineveh, having realized that Nineb's mind has been made to move, leaves him with a piece of advice: to protect his heart against the "sickness of the West".

The rest of the story takes place after Nineb's immigration to Sydney. After he lands, he ignores Nineveh's romantic pleas for him and develops a depression and homesickness following culture shock. As he intends to overcome the language barrier between Assyrian and English, he meets and becomes infatuated with Nina. Nina is a woman who strikingly resembles Nineveh, to Nineb's surprise and beguilement, where he ultimately faces a direful dilemma over the two. While Nineb continues to ignore Nineveh's letters, he begins to meet Nina's family and they eventually profess their love for each other.

In the meantime, Nineb experiences familial problems as he interacts with his generous brother Sargon, his emotionally abusive sister-in-law Suzy and her sister-in-law Asmar, Asmar's husband Enkidu, and Nina's avaricious father David, in suburban Sydney. David, who is greedy, lustful, and prejudiced, is considered as the film's antagonist and rejects Nineb for being broke and a nokhraya (Syriac: ܢܘܼܟ݂ܪܵܝܵܐ, lit. 'Foreigner'). As he is rejected by David, Nineb storms out, but not before telling him that Assyrians who highlight differences and drive wedges between tribes and sects are far more dangerous.

The climax of the film occurs as Nina avoids David following the bad interaction between him and Nineb. David brings a young businessman to his house where they get incredibly drunk, and eventually, the businessman reveals his interest in Nina to him. David approves in order to smooth over a million dollar business venture; as David checks on her drunkenly, his drink is spiked with drugs and he passes out. The businessman than rapes Nina and takes her virginity. Meanwhile, Suzy attempts to buy Nineb off in order to get her end of the deal with David to keep him away from Nina. As Nina and Nineb meet once more, Nina suddenly breaks off her relationship with Nineb, and the film's title ballad Wardeh Deesheh begins to play. Meanwhile, Nina and Nineb's families each face their own trauma as Enkidu confronts Nina's rapist in a violent exchange that leaves him dead. Furthermore, Sargon and Suzy's household, which often grapples with domestic violence, have their own fight which culminates in their daughter Cathy's death after falling on a stairstep.

In the final scene, Nineb makes a choice between Nina and Nineveh. Nina delivers a letter from Nineveh, disappointed that he did not think to write back to her after she had fallen ill, and informs him that his brother Ashour has died from the same sickness. As Nineb attends Cathy's funeral, he prays to ask for a second chance at life with Nineveh, and he flies back to his homeland.

== Themes ==
Allegorically, Nineb's love for Nineveh symbolises the Assyrian's yearning for the homeland and his love for Nina represents the desire for a prosperous lifestyle in the West. According to Homeh, the reason why Nineb chose Nineveh and flew back to Nineveh in the final scene was because, in his view, Assyrians as a people belong in Assyria. Like Nineb, many Assyrian immigrants face depression, culture shock, economic disturbance and homesickness as they resettle abroad.

According to the director John Homeh in a 2020 interview, the rape scene of Nina is a metaphor for the attack and raping of the Assyrian diaspora's existence. Nina's sexual assault terminates her relationship with Nineb due to shame, which thereby symbolises the death of the Assyrian cause in the future, in the diaspora. Homeh also included the scene as a critique of the stigma that victims of rape deal with after an episode of sexual assault, something that hadn't been previously seen in Assyrian art. Thereafter, Nineb realises he has no future being away from Nineveh and must return to his homeland to be with his first love Nineveh, who is a symbolic personification of the Assyrian city Nineveh.

== Soundtrack ==
=== Songs ===
Ninwetee (Syriac: ܢܝܼܢܘܵܝܬܝܼ) is a notable duet performed by Nineb and Nineveh (Homeh and Jendo) during the movie, and is featured on Homeh's 1991 album, Ktawa. During the part of the film where Homeh and Jendo sing their duet, Nineb and Nineveh avow their love for another on an electric boat while sailing down the Sydney Harbour.

In 1993, Jendo released a new musical album titled Wardeh Deesheh, named after the film. Although the album contains new songs, some of the songs from the film such as Bereethan, Le Shoqinakh (featuring George Homeh) and Wardeh Deesheh were also present. The album was recorded at Assyrian run-studios in both Australia and Sweden, and a 10-track cassette was issued in Aleppo the same year.

=== Background music ===
Recurring background music includes Concierto De Aranjuez by Joaquín Rodrigo and Solenzara by Enrico Macias (with the former being used as the film's romantic theme music), and Naghmeh from the 1983 album NeyNava by Iranian musician Hossein Alizadeh (which serves as the film's sorrowful theme). Recurring dramatic or pensive music used in the film include excerpts from the tracks The Mission and River by Ennio Morricone, which are from the soundtrack of The Mission (1986).

Furthermore, Lullaby by Johannes Brahms, She (instrumental) by Charles Aznavour and Herbert Kretzmer, and El Degüello by Victor Hamilton are used in one sequence of the film. A sample of a Michael Jackson song can also be briefly heard as Nineb enters Australia for the first time.

== Legacy ==
Retrospectives of the film highlight its success as being the first popular Assyrian movie, despite it not being the very first movie from the Assyrian community. Jendo highlighted her performance in the film as one of the highlights of her singing career in a 2020 interview, where she reflected on the positive working relationship she had with the cast and the harsh conditions on set. The themes of the film have also been retrospectively discussed as new to the Assyrian community and addressing taboo subjects that were not previously discussed.

The duet between Nineb and Nineveh continues to remain a popular classic Assyrian song, with Assyrians today both reminiscing of and enjoying Homeh and Jendo's performance.

== Cast ==
- George Homeh as Nineb
- Juliana Jendo as Nina/Nineveh (dual role)
- Lydia Bennett as Suzy
- George Slivo as Enkidu
- Yonia Slewo as Asmar
- Wilson Youmaran as Sargon
- Awrahim Khanu as David
- Rita Homeh as Cathy
- Sargon Mama as Yonatan
- Toris Yako as the Mother
- Margarette David as Khana
- Shlemon Askaroo as Zaia
- Ramzi Bazi as the Doctor
