= Nouri Iskandar =

Syrian musicologist (1938–2023)

Nouri Iskandar ܢܘܪܝ ܐܣܟܢܕܪ نوري إسكندر
- Born: 1938; Deir al-Zor, Syria
- Origin: Aleppo, Syria
- Died: 25 December 2023 (aged 85) Örebro, Sweden
- Genres: Syriac sacral music, Assyrian folk music
- Occupations: musicologist, composer
- Years active: 1960s–2023

Nouri Iskandar (Syriac: ܢܘܪܝ ܐܣܟܢܕܪ, Arabic: نوري إسكندر, 1938–2023) was a Syrian musicologist and composer. Influenced from his youth to pursue musical studies, he became a composer of Syriac sacral and Assyrian folk-pop music, for which he is most well-known.

With a career that spanned more than 50 years, Iskandar is regarded as one of the pioneers of modern Assyrian music, having presented many studies, musical works, and independent research on Syriac melodies. He is considered one of the most popular Western Assyrian musicians alongside Gabriel Asaad and Joseph Malke. Throughout his career, he played a role in establishing multiple choirs and creating/preserving more than 700 sacral songs.

== Early life ==
Nuri Iskandar was born in Deir al-Zor to an Assyrian family originally from Urfa in modern-day Turkey. His family moved to Raqqa before settling in Aleppo, where he later joined the local Syriac Orthodox scout band playing the trumpet. He studied at the Higher Institute of Music at the University of Cairo between 1959 and 1964 and graduated with a bachelor's degree in music. After finishing his studies he returned to Aleppo and began to work as a school teacher, teaching singing and choir courses.

Throughout his time as a schoolteacher, Iskandar continued to teach himself music lessons from textbooks and learned how to play the oud.

== Career ==
Starting in the early 1960s, Iskandar composed folk songs that would eventually become some of the most popular in modern Assyrian music, such as O Habibo (Syriac: ܐܘ ܚܒܝܒܐ), Zliqe Frse (Syriac: ܙܠܩ̈ܐ ܦܪܣܝ), Lo Tehfukh (Syriac: ܠܐ ܬܗܦܟ), and an opera called Parqana (Syriac: ܦܪܩܢܐ). Iskandar's compositions have been compared to those by Gabriel Asaad, who is also considered a modern pioneer of Assyrian folk-pop music. These compositions are regarded as a mix of the modal structures of Syriac sacral music of the Syriac Orthodox Church and the Arabic maqam, with influences from Western music. Upon returning to Syria he established a number of choirs and groups, such as the Shamiram Folklore and Musical Group alongside Aho Gabriel and Amanuel Salamon from 1970 to 1973.

In 1971, Iskandar heard of Habib Mousa's song "Shamo mar" (Syriac: ܫܡܐ ܡܪܝ) and worked with the Assyrian Democratic Organization to release a record. In the same year, he composed two songs by Jan Barbar, titled “Ḥabib at ḥaye” (Syriac: ܚܒܝܒܝ ܐܢܬܝ ܚܝ̈ܐ) in Surayt and "Talakh ya khliti" (Syriac: ܬܐ ܠܟܝ ܝܐ ܚܠܝܬܝ) in Suret.

In 1973, Iskandar participated in the first modern festival of Assyrian music at the UNESCO Palace in Beirut, presenting a number of Assyrian folk songs with the Lebanese musicians Wadi al-Safi and Habib Mousa. In 1977, Iskandar composed and recorded a cassette in collaboration with the Shamiram Folklore and Music Group in Aleppo, which featured singers such as Juliana Ayoub and Ghandi Hanna. Iskandar also composed soundtracks for several shows and films in Syria throughout his career.

In 1991, Iskandar conducted a concert in Europe with the Nineveh Music and Folklore Band, considered a milestone for Assyrian music on the continent. In 1992 Iskandar published a comprehensive book commissioned by UNESCO that compiled his previously published songs into one book. The book, titled Beth Gazo (Syriac: ܒܝܬ ܓܙܐ, lit. 'The Treasury of Songs'), is written in both Arabic and Turoyo, and contains more than 700 different Syriac Orthodox chants. The book received reeditions in 1996 and 2003, and addresses the repertoire of Deir al-Zafaran and Ruha.

Iskandar was the director of the Music Conservatory of Aleppo from 1996 until 2011, and moved to Örebro, Sweden in 2014, having fled Aleppo due to the violence of the Syrian civil war.

== Personal life ==
Iskandar commonly remarked on the importance of Syriac sacral music in the history of the music of Syria, noting its pagan origins from before Christianity and its influences from Mesopotamia. He had previously expressed interest in Islamic and Arabic music, having been greatly influenced by his travels and studies to incorporate them into his methodology. He married and had two daughters, Mariam and Sousan.

== Death and commemoration ==
On Christmas Day 2023, Iskandar died at the age of 85. His death was announced the same day by the Syrian Ministry of Culture and was commemorated across Assyrian communities in the diaspora and Sweden, with musician Lolita Emmanuel writing "Malfono worked tirelessly to document our culture and to celebrate the continuity of ancient Assyrian heritage...He showed the world the historically rooted contributions of indigenous Assyrians to the Middle Eastern musical landscape."

A tribute concert was held in his memory shortly after his death. His funeral service was held on January 4 of the next year. His death was honored by the Nineveh Music Group in early February 2024. The Assyrian Monitor for Human Rights organized a commemorative event in Eskilstuna featuring a documentary that chronicled his life's work and testimonials from many that knew him personally.

In late 2024, it was announced that a commemorative album would be released in honor of Nouri. The album contains a recording of one of Iskandar's concerts from 2014 and was released on Spotify the same day.

== Bibliography ==
- Lundberg, Dan (1 December 1998). "Welcome to Assyria – your land on the Cyber Space: Music and the Internet in the establishment of a transnational Assyrian identity". Etnomusikologian vuosikirja. 10. Finland: 13–28. doi:10.23985/evk.101081.
- Sørensen, Søren Møller (2017). "Interview with the Syrian composer Nouri Iskander" (PDF). Department of Arts and Cultural Studies. Danish Musicology Online. 8. University of Copenhagen: 31–43. ISSN 1904-237X.
- Zeidieh, Ghyas (Spring 2020). A Performance Guide to the Syrian Composer Nouri Iskandar's "Concerto for Cello and Chamber Orchestra" with Emphasis on Its Syrian and Assyrian Roots (Thesis). University of Iowa. doi:10.17077/etd.005458.
- Zeitoune, Abboud (2016). Music Heritage of Mesopotamia. Assyrischer Jugendverband Mitteleuropa e.V. ISBN 978-3-00-053601-4.
