= The Mission (soundtrack) =

Soundtrack album by Ennio Morricone
- Released: August 5, 1986 (Original); December 17, 2002 (Remastered)
- Recorded: September 1985–February 1986, London
- Genre: Classical
- Length: 48:47
- Label: Virgin Records
- Producer: Ennio Morricone

Ennio Morricone soundtracks chronology
The Venetian Woman (1986)	The Mission (1986)	C.A.T. Squad (1986)

Singles from The Mission
- 1. "Gabriel's Oboe" Released: August 5, 1986

Professional ratings
Review scores
Source	Rating
Allmusic	4.5/5 stars
Filmtracks.com	5/5 stars

The Mission is the soundtrack from the film of the same name (directed by Roland Joffé), composed, orchestrated, conducted and produced by Ennio Morricone. The work combines liturgical chorales, native drumming, and Spanish-influenced guitars, often in the same track, in an attempt to capture the varying cultures depicted in the film. The main theme, "Falls", remains one of Morricone's most memorable pieces, and has been used in numerous commercials since its original release. The Italian song "Nella Fantasia" ("In My Fantasy") is based on the theme "Gabriel's Oboe" and has been recorded by multiple artists including, Sarah Brightman, Amici Forever, Il Divo, Russell Watson, Hayley Westenra, Jackie Evancho, Katherine Jenkins, Amira Willighagen and Yasuto Tanaka.

The soundtrack was nominated for an Academy Award in 1987 and won the Golden Globe Award for Best Original Score and the BAFTA Award for Best Music. It was selected as the 23rd best film score in American Cinema in the American Film Institute's 100 Years of Film Scores. The music was also used during the 2002 Winter Olympics in Salt Lake City, Utah.

== Track listing ==
All songs by Ennio Morricone.

1. "On Earth as It Is in Heaven" – 3:50
2. "Falls" – 1:55
3. "Gabriel's Oboe" – 2:14
4. "Ave Maria Guaraní" – 2:51
5. "Brothers" – 1:32
6. "Carlotta" – 1:21
7. "Vita Nostra" – 1:54
8. "Climb" – 1:37
9. "Remorse" – 2:46
10. "Penance" – 4:03
11. "The Mission" – 2:49
12. "River" – 1:59
13. "Gabriel's Oboe" – 2:40
14. "Te Deum Guaraní" – 0:48
15. "Refusal" – 3:30
16. "Asunción" – 1:27
17. "Alone" – 4:25
18. "Guaraní" – 3:56
19. "The Sword" – 2:00
20. "Miserere" – 1:00

== Charts ==
Chart (1987)	Peak position
Australia (Kent Music Report)	26

== Certifications and sales ==
Region	Certification	Certified units/sales
Argentina (CAPIF)	Gold	30,000^{^}
Canada (Music Canada)	Gold	50,000^{^}
France (SNEP)	Gold	100,000^{*}
Poland (ZPAV)	Platinum	100,000^{*}
Spain (Promusicae)	Platinum	100,000^{^}
United Kingdom (BPI)	Gold	100,000^{^}
United States (RIAA)	Gold	500,000^{^}
^{*} Sales figures based on certification alone.^{^} Shipments figures based on certification alone.

== Personnel ==
- Ennio Morricone: Conductor, arranger.
- David Bedford: Conductor.
- London Philharmonic Orchestra.
- Joan Whiting: Oboist
- Barnet Schools Choir.

== Academy Awards ==
Morricone's score for The Mission did not win the Oscar for Best Original Score, losing to Herbie Hancock's Round Midnight. The award is considered one of the most controversial in that category, because it defeated James Horner's score for Aliens, Jerry Goldsmith's score for Hoosiers and that of Ennio Morricone for The Mission. In his review of the score to Hoosiers, Christian Clemmensen of Filmtracks.com stated: "The awarding of the Original Score Oscar for 1986 to Herbie Hancock for Round Midnight is considered one of the greatest of the many injustices that have befallen nominees for that category. Ennio Morricone and, to a lesser extent, James Horner were worthy of recognition that year, though Goldsmith's Hoosiers stands in a class of its own because of its immense impact on the picture."

Morricone, who did not win a competitive Oscar until 2015 (for Quentin Tarantino's The Hateful Eight), said in an interview: "I definitely felt that I should have won for The Mission, especially when you consider that the Oscar-winner that year was Round Midnight, which was not an original score. It had a very good arrangement by Herbie Hancock, but it used existing pieces. So there could be no comparison with The Mission. There was a theft!". As a result, the music branch of the Academy decided to "tighten up the rules" so that "Scores diluted by the use of tracked (inserted music not written by the composer) or pre-existing music" would no longer be eligible for award nomination.

== See also ==
- Nella fantasia
