= Mary Jubran =

Syrian musician, born 1911

Mary Jubran ماري جبران
- Born: ماري جبران; 1907; Beirut, Ottoman Empire
- Died: 1956 (aged 48–49) Damascus, Syria
- Genres: Dawr, Muwashshah, patriotic Syrian songs
- Occupations: Classical Arabic music singer and dancer
- Instrument: oud
- Years active: 1927-1950s

Mary Jubran, also spelled Marie Joubran, (Arabic: ماري جبران; 1907 or 1911–1956) was a Syrian soprano singer mainly active in Ottoman Egypt and Syria. She was known for her interpretations of classical Arabic vocal genres, including dawr and muwashshah, as well as for her patriotic Syrian songs.

== Life ==
Jubran was born in 1911 in Beirut, Ottoman Empire. As a young child she moved with her family from Beirut to Damascus to flee the events that were taking place in Lebanon during the First World War. At the death of her father Yussef Jubran, Jubran when to live with her aunt, the actress Marie Jubran, with whom she lived with in Jerusalem. At age 10, Jubran began to study Arabic dance, theater, singing and the oud. She then became a singer in the troupe of an Egyptian actor, Husayn al-Barbari.

She went on to perform in Jaffa, Haifa, in Mandate Palestine, and Cairo. In Jerusalem, her artistic reputation grew and she became known as Mary "La petite" to differentiate her from her aunt. She returned to Damascus between 1924 and 1925 after nine years of absence. She then left Damascus for Beirut due to the uprising of the Syrian population for independence from French rule.

In 1927 she returned to Syria where she performed successively in Damascus and Aleppo. In the early 1930s, Jubran's artistic reputation spread to Cairo, where she performed for seven years. In the late 1930s, she returned to Damascus where she performed at the Al-Abbassiyat Club. In 1950 she was elected president of the Syrian Musicians' Union.

During her career, Mary Jubran sang with well-known Egyptian musicians, such as Sayed Darwish, Dawood Hosni, Zakariyya Ahmad, Abu Al-'ala Muhammad, Mohamed al-Qasabgi, and Mohammed Abdel Wahab. Further, she performed with Syrian musicians including Zaki Muhammad, Najib al-Sarrâj, Muhammad Muhsen, Riyad al-Bundak, and Rashid Azzou. After the start of the Syrian National Radio in 1947, Jubran's voice was broadcast on the radio, among others featuring her songs "Khamrat al-Rabi'" (Wine of Spring), as well as patriotic songs "Dimashq" (Damascus) and "Zenobia", composed by Zaki Mohammad.

An anthology of Mary Jubran's recordings was published in 2000 by the Syrian Ministry of Culture as no. 16 of the Collection of Masters of Music and Syrian Song. She died of cancer in Damascus in 1956.
