= Taw Mim Semkath =

Assyrian school and orphanage

- Classical Syriac: ܬܡܣ
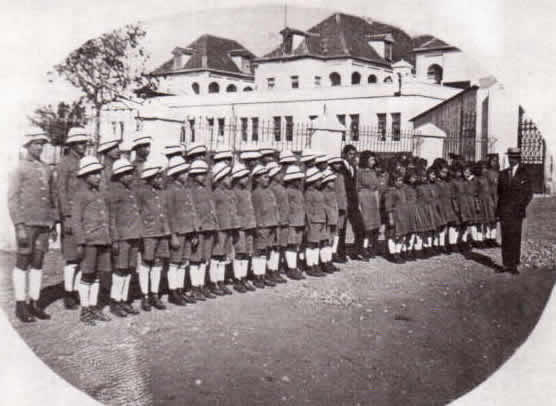
- Orphaned Assyrian children outside Taw Mim Semkath in October 1922 after it was closed by Turkish authorities.

Information
- Former names: Classical Syriac: ܒܝܬ ܝܬܡܐ ܕܐܬܘܪܝܐ ܒܩܝܠܝܩܝܐ; Assyrian National School Association
- Established: 1919; 107 years ago

Taw Mim Semkath (Syriac: ܬܡܣ T.M.S., originally ܒܝܬ ܝܬܡܐ ܕܐܬܘܪܝܐ ܒܩܝܠܝܩܝܐ Beth Yatme d-Othuroye b-Qiliqiya), also known as Assyrian National School Association (ANSA) after its founding organisation, is an Assyrian school and orphanage that opened in Adana in 1919 for orphaned Assyrian children who survived the Assyrian genocide. The Assyrian National School Association, established in Stirling, New Jersey in 1899 by Assyrian immigrants from Diyarbakir who fled the massacre in 1895, founded the school with help from the French High Commissioner. The Syriac Orthodox bishop Yuhanon Dolabani was an important figure at the school, contributing a lot with teaching and organizing. In 1921, the school was closed by the Turkish authorities and moved to Bourj Hammoud, Lebanon, where it is still running.
