= The Canticle of the Sun (Sowerby) =

Musical composition by Leo Sowerby

The Canticle of the Sun is a musical composition by Leo Sowerby (1895–1968) setting Matthew Arnold's English translation of Francis of Assisi's "Canticle of the Sun" for chorus and orchestra in 1945; the work was awarded the Pulitzer Prize for Music the following year. The first performance was in New York at Carnegie Hall by the Schola Cantorum and the New York Philharmonic on April 16, 1945. The first recording of it by Chicago's Grant Park Orchestra and Chorus under Carlos Kalmar was released in June 2011. The piece was commissioned by the Alice M. Ditson Fund.

The 1946 Jury Report is lost and thus the other finalists are unknown for that year, however the jury consisted of Chalmers Clifton, Aaron Copland, and Howard Hanson.
