= Hushabye (album) =

Studio album by Hayley Westenra
- Released: 14 June 2013
- Recorded: 2013
- Genre: Classical, Traditional music
- Length: 43:36
- Label: Decca, Universal
- Producer: Jon Cohen

Hayley Westenra chronology
Paradiso (2011)	Hushabye (2013)

Hushabye is the sixth international studio album by Christchurch, New Zealand soprano Hayley Westenra. The album consists of lullabies and other gentle songs, and is intended to be a calming experience for both children and adults; Westenra sang closer to the microphone than normal in order to create an appropriate atmosphere.

The fourth track on the album, "Sleep On", was composed by Paul Mealor with lyrics by Brendan Graham as a lullaby for the then-Duke and Duchess of Cambridge's baby. Westenra and her record company, Decca Records, will be giving away a copy of the album to every new parent in the UK, Australia, and New Zealand whose child was born on the same day as the royal baby.

== Track listing ==
1. "Pretty Little Horses"
2. "Hushabye Mountain" (from Chitty Chitty Bang Bang)
3. "Dream a Little Dream"
4. "Sleep On"
5. "Twinkle Twinkle Little Star"
6. "Go to Sleep"
7. "Brahms Lullaby"
8. "Goodnight My Angel"
9. "All Through the Night"
10. "Baby Mine" (from Dumbo)
11. "Hine E Hine"
12. "When at Night I Go to Sleep"
13. "Stay Awake" (from Mary Poppins)

Deluxe edition

14. "All I Have to Do Is Dream"
15. "Bau Bei"
16. "All Through the Night" (Welsh version)

Japanese edition

14. "Yurikago No Uta (Cradle Song)"
15. "Nemunoki No Komoriuta"
16. "Bridge Over Troubled Water"

== Charts ==
Chart (2013)	Peak position
New Zealand Albums Chart	14
