= Paradiso 10th Anniversary Homecoming Tour =

2011–12 concert tour by Hayley Westenra

- Tour by Hayley Westenra
- Associated album: "Paradiso"
- Start date: 17 September 2011
- End date: 8 March 2012
- Legs: 3
- No. of shows: 10 in New Zealand; 8 in UK; 18 total
Hayley Westenra tour chronology
Christmas Wishes Tour (2010)	Paradiso 10th Anniversary Homecoming Tour (2011)

Paradiso Homecoming Tour was a concert tour by New Zealand classical crossover singer Hayley Westenra.

To promote the 5th international studio album and spread love messages from Paradiso, New Zealands biggest selling artist of all time, Westenra embarked on the Paradiso Homecoming Tour, a tour of UK, New Zealand, and the east of Asia.

During the New Zealand homecoming tour, Westenra would perform with guest artist Sir Edmund Hillary-Scholar Chase Douglas and would raise charity attention to her UNICEF Goodwill Ambassador appeal and the Christchurch Earthquake Relief fund to support revival of Christchurch.

== Tour dates ==
Date	City	Country	Venue
Europe
17 September 2011	Blaina	Wales	Ebbw Vale
24 September 2011	Conwy	Wales	Llandudno
Oceania
15 November 2011	Hamilton	New Zealand	Claudelands Arena
16 November 2011	Auckland	New Zealand	Auckland Civic Theatre
18 November 2011	Wellington	New Zealand	Michael Fowler Centre
20 November 2011	Addington	New Zealand	CBS Canterbury Arena
21 November 2011	Timaru	New Zealand	Theatre Royal
23 November 2011	Invercargill	New Zealand	Civic Theatre
24 November 2011	Dunedin	New Zealand	Regent Theatre
26 November 2011	Palmerston North	New Zealand	Regent on Broadway
27 November 2011	New Plymouth	New Zealand	TBS Theatre - TBS Showpiece
29 November 2011	Napier	New Zealand	Napier Municipal Theatre
Asia
14 December 2011	Tainan	Taiwan	Tainan Culture Centre Hall
16 December 2011	Taichung	Taiwan	Taichung Yuanman Outdoor Theatre
17 December 2011	Taipei	Taiwan	National Concert Hall
Europe
29 February 2012	Gateshead	England	Gateshead The Sage
1 March 2012	Rhyl	Wales	Rhyl Pavilion
4 March 2012	Northampton	England	Northampton Derngate
5 March 2012	Manchester	England	Bridgewater Hall
7 March 2012	Westcliff-on-Sea	England	Cliffs Pavilion
8 March 2012	Bournemouth	England	Bournemouth Pavilion
