= Love Came Down at Christmas =

Poem by Christina Rossetti

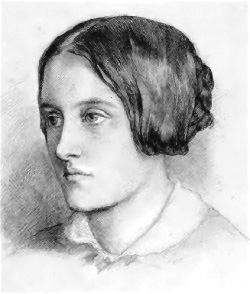
Christina Rossetti

"Love Came Down at Christmas" is a Christmas poem by Christina Rossetti. It was first published without a title in Time Flies: A Reading Diary in 1885. It was later included in the collection Verses, published by SPCK, in 1893 under the title "Christmastide".

The poem has been set to music as a Christmas carol by many composers including R O Morris, Harold Darke, Leo Sowerby, John Kelsall and John Rutter and is also sung to the traditional Irish melody "Garton". More recently, the poem was given a modern treatment by Jars of Clay on its 2007 album, Christmas Songs. American composer Jennifer Higdon set the text for solo soprano, harp and four-part chorus. A new setting by the British composer David J Loxley-Blount was performed in Southwark Cathedral on 8 December 2014 by the Financial Times Choir, conducted by Paul Ayres. It was repeated by the Trafalgar Square Christmas Tree on 11 December 2014.

Studwell describes the poem as "simple, direct and sincere" and notes that it is a rare example of a carol which has overcome the disadvantage of "not having a tune (or two or three) which has caught the imagination of holiday audiences."

Love came down at Christmas,
Love all lovely, Love Divine,
Love was born at Christmas,
Star and Angels gave the sign.

Worship we the Godhead,
Love Incarnate, Love Divine,
Worship we our Jesus,
But wherewith for sacred sign?

Love shall be our token,
Love be yours and love be mine,
Love to God and all men,
Love for plea and gift and sign.

== See also ==
- List of Christmas carols
