= Juliana Jendo =

Assyrian-American singer and actress

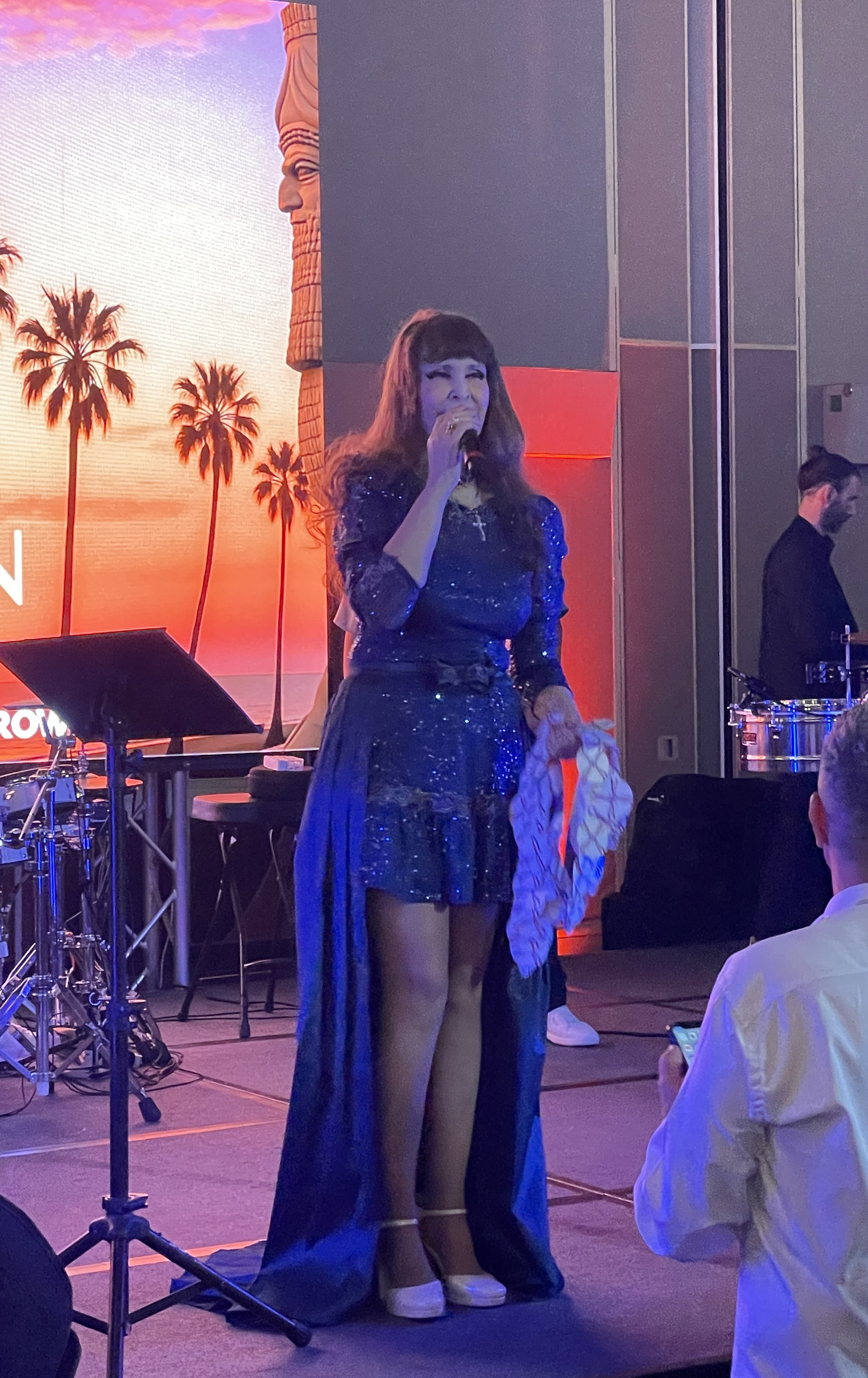
- Jendo performing at a convention, 2025

Background information
- Born: Juliana Jendo; November 30, 1956 (age 69); Tel Tamer, Al-Hasakah Governorate, Syria
- Genres: Assyrian music, Pop, Folk pop, World music, Dance, Folk dance.
- Occupations: Singer and actress
- Instrument: vocals
- Years active: 1986–present

Juliana Jendo (Syriac: ܓܘܠܝܢܐ ܓܢܕܐ; born November 30, 1956, in Tel Tamer, Syria) is a Syrian Assyrian singer and actress who, unlike many other Assyrian Neo-Aramaic-speaking artists, has occasionally recorded songs in Surayt/Turoyo and Arabic. She has mostly recorded folk dance music.

== Biography ==
Born in Tel Tamer, Syria, she studied French literature at a university there. Her family was displaced from their homeland in Tur Abdin during Sayfo, and they were deported to Syria. In 1980, she and her family immigrated to the United States. She currently resides in Michigan and frequently visits Chicago, Illinois. Furthermore, she is an honorary chairwoman of the organization Nasraya Ad Dema that she founded.

== 2024 arrest in Sweden ==
On 20 October 2024, Jendo was planned to perform at a party in Södertälje, Sweden but due to suspicion of tax fraud before the planned performance, it was cancelled. The organizer of the event stated that there have previously been no issues in organizing performances with Assyrian artists. Much indicates that the organizer of the event had not provided all the necessesary paper-work before the planned event, which caused the event being cancelled. Jendo has performed in Sweden several times through the years, without any complications.

In a statement on her social media later that day, it was announced that Juliana would later be released after efforts from Swedish Assyrian lawyers.

== Discography ==
=== Albums ===
- Mardita (1987)
- Khater Aynatoukh (1988)
- Love & Dance (1990)
- Wardeh Deesheh (1993)
- Beble D-Atour (The Flowers Of Assyria) (1994)
- Qadri (Arabic) (1994)
- Athro Halyo (Turoyo) (1995)
- Asheq D-Matwatan (1998)
- Mellati (2003)
- Elemo Halyo (Turoyo) (2008)
- Tel Keppe (Arabic, Turoyo) (2008)
- Golden Tunes (2010)

=== Singles ===
- "Talibootha" (2015)
- "Brekha Ethokhon" (2018)
- "Go Qaploukh Babi" (2021)
- "Mdalal Qalbi" (2021)
- "Aweleh" (2022)
- "Taloukh Baby" feat. Kynexx Obimba (2022)
- "Alqoshnaya" (2023)
- "Jwanqa Shetrana" (2023)
- "Aha Khouba" (2024)
- "A Tribute to Tel Keppe" (2024)
- "Laylee" (2024)
- "Kopala d'Jeelou (2025)
- "Zyaptet Khetna" (2025)
- "Ankawa" (2025)

== Filmography ==
- 1988 – Semeleh (Silent short film)
- 1991 – Wardeh Deesheh (Trampled Flowers) (Dual role: Nineveh and Nina)
- 1994 – The Flowers of Assyria (eight music videos)
- 2005 – The Cost of Happiness (Supporting role: Yimma "Mother")
