= Leo Sowerby =

American composer and church musician (1895–1968)

- Born: Leo Salkeld Sowerby; May 1, 1895; Grand Rapids, Michigan, U.S.
- Died: July 7, 1968 (aged 73); Port Clinton, Ohio, U.S.
- Education: American Conservatory of Music
- Occupations: Composer; church musician; organist
- Years active: 1910s–1960s
- Employers: American Conservatory of Music; Fourth Presbyterian Church of Chicago; St. James Episcopal Church; Washington National Cathedral
- Notable work: The Canticle of the Sun; (List of compositions)
- Style: Classical
- Awards: Rome Prize (1921); Pulitzer Prize for Music (1946)

Leo Salkeld Sowerby (May 1, 1895 – July 7, 1968) was an American composer and church musician. He won the Pulitzer Prize for Music in 1946 and was often called the "Dean of American church music" in the early to mid-20th century. His many students included Florence Price and Ned Rorem.

== Biography ==
Leo Sowerby was born on May 1, 1895, to Florence Gertrude Salkeld and John Sowerby in Grand Rapids, Michigan, where he began to compose at the age of ten. His interest in the organ began at the age of 15, and he was self-taught on the instrument. He studied composition with Arthur Olaf Andersen at the American Conservatory of Music in Chicago. Early recognition came when his Violin Concerto was premiered in 1913 by the Chicago Symphony Orchestra. He spent time in France during World War I as a bandmaster. In 1921, he was awarded the Rome Prize (from the American Academy in Rome), the first composer to receive it. He began teaching at the American Conservatory of Music in 1924. He received the 1946 Pulitzer Prize for Music for his cantata, The Canticle of the Sun, written in 1944.

In 1919, Sowerby became associate organist at the Fourth Presbyterian Church of Chicago, and, in 1927, he became organist and choirmaster at St. James Episcopal Church in Chicago, which was consecrated as a cathedral in 1955 while he was there.

In 1962, after his retirement from St. James, he was called to Washington National Cathedral to become the founding director of the College of Church Musicians, a position he held until his death in 1968. He died in Port Clinton, Ohio, while at Camp Wa-Li-Ro in Put-in-Bay, Ohio, the summer choir camp where he had taught for many years. He is buried in Washington National Cathedral.

His substantial output includes over 500 works in many classical genres, excluding opera and ballet. His later works, composed while he was at St. James, Chicago, and Washington National Cathedral, are primarily church music for choir and organ.

For Sowerby's notable pupils, See: List of music students by teacher: R to S#Leo Sowerby. (Note: ccc)

== Selected works ==
=== Choral ===
- Cantatas
  - A Liturgy of Hope (selections from the Psalms; 1917)
  - The Vision of Sir Launfal poem of James Russell Lowell (1925)
  - Forsaken of Man (Passion setting, adapted from the Gospels by Edward Borgers; 1939)
  - The Canticle of the Sun (St. Francis of Assisi; 1944)
  - Christ Reborn, for voices and organ (1950)
  - The Throne of God (Book of Revelation), for voices and orchestra (1956)
  - The Ark of the Covenant, for voices and organ (1961)
- Anthems
  - "Ad te levavi animam meam"
  - "Be ye followers of God"
  - "Behold, O God our Defender"
  - "Christians, to the Paschal Victim"
  - "Come, Holy Ghost, our souls inspire"
  - "Eternal light"
  - "I was glad when they said unto me" (Psalm 122)
  - "I will lift up mine eyes" (Psalm 121)
  - "Love Came Down at Christmas"
  - "Now There Lightens Upon Us"
  - "Thy Word is a lantern" (in memory of President John F. Kennedy)
  - "Seeing We Also Are Compassed About" (Hebrews 12:1–2, commissioned by the Illinois Wesleyan University Collegiate Choir in the fall of 1957)

=== Solo voice with accompaniment ===
Originally published by H. W. Gray, reprinted by the Leo Sowerby Foundation, Bryn Mawr, Pa., Theodore Presser, sole selling agent, 1996.

- The Edge of Dreams, song cycle, with piano (Mark Turbyfill), H. 154 (1920)
1. "The Adventurer"
2. "After-thought"
3. "Sorrow"
4. "Pulse of Spring"
5. "The Forest of Dead Trees"
6. "O Love that has Come at All"
- "I Will Lift Up Mine Eyes", with organ (Psalm 121), H. 147
- "O God of Light" (Matthew 5:13–16) (1934)
- "O Jesus, Lord of Mercy" (1934)
- " Perfect Love" (D. F. Gurney), H. 237 (1939)
- "Thou Art My Strength", with organ (Psalm 30)
- Three Psalms for bass and organ, H. 189 (1949)
1. "Hear My Cry, O God" (Psalm 61)
2. "The Lord Is My Shepherd" (Psalm 23)
3. "How Long Wilt Thou Forget Me?"
- Three Psalms for baritone or contralto and organ, H. 228
1. "Whoso Dwelleth" (Psalm 91)
2. "O Be Joyful in the Lord" (Psalm 100)
3. "I Will Lift Up Mine Eyes" (Psalm 121)

=== Organ solo ===
- Comes Autumn Time (1916)
- Carillon (1917)
- Requiescat in Pace (1920)
- Symphony in G (1930)
- Pageant (1931)
- Toccata for Organ (1941)
- Meditations on Communion Hymns (1942)
- Prelude on "The King's Majesty" (1945)
- "Canon, Chacony, & Fugue" (1948)
- Ten Hymn Preludes (published separately; 1950s)
- Suite for Organ (1951)
- "Sinfonia Brevis" (1965)
- Passacaglia (1967)

=== Organ with other instruments ===
- Elevation, for violin and organ (1912)
- Ballade, for English horn and organ (1949)
- Festival Musick for organ, brass and timpani (1953)
  - Toccata on 'A.G.O.' (third movement of Festival Musick)
- Fantasy, for trumpet and organ (1962)

=== Orchestra ===
- Five symphonies
  - No. 1 (1921)
  - No. 2 (1927)
  - No. 3 (1939–40)
  - No. 4 (1944–47)
  - No. 5 (1964)
- Comes Autumn Time, "program overture" (organ version 1916; orchestrated 1917)
- From the Northland, suite for orchestra (1923)
- Synconata, symphonic poem for jazz orchestra (1924)
- Symphony for Jazz Orchestra (“Monotony”), suite for jazz orchestra (1925)
- Prairie, symphonic poem for orchestra (1929)
- A Set of Four: A Suite of Ironics, published in 1931

=== Orchestra with solo instruments ===
- Violin Concerto in G major (1913, revised 1924)
- Cello Concerto in A major (1914–16)
- Piano Concerto no. 1 (1916, revised 1919)
- Ballad of King Estmere, for two pianos and orchestra (1922)
- Medieval Poem, for organ and orchestra (1926)
- Cello Concerto [no. 2] in E minor (1929–34)
- Piano Concerto no. 2 (1932)
- Organ Concerto no. 1 (1937)
- Classic Concerto, for organ and string orchestra (1944)
- Concerto in C, for organ and orchestra
- Harp Concerto
- Concert Piece, for organ and orchestra (1951)

=== Chamber music ===
- Three Violin Sonatas
  - No. 1 in A major
  - No. 2 in B♭ major (1922)
  - No. 3 in D major
- Sonata for Cello and Piano (1920)
- Sonata for Viola and Piano (also playable on clarinet)
- Piano Trio in C♯ minor
- Serenade for string quartet in G major composed in 1917 as a birthday gift to Elizabeth Sprague Coolidge, published 1921
- Trio for flute, viola, and pianoforte composed 1919
- Wind Quintet (1916, published in 1930 by H.T. FitzSimons)
- Piano Sonata in D major (1948, rev. 1964)
- Passacaglia for piano
- Sonata for trumpet and piano (1958)
- Sonata for Clarinet and Piano (1944)

== Discography ==
- "Impressions: Music for Piano" (Suites: "Florida" and "From the Northland" Folksong and Country Dance Tunes: "Three Folk-tunes from Somerset", "Money Musk", "Fisherman's Tune", "The Irish Washerwoman: A Country Dance Tune", "L'Amour Di Quei Due (The Two Lovers): A Milanese Popular Song") – Malcolm Halliday, pianist : (Troy 226), Albany: Troy Records, 1997 Records
- My Love Unspoken (21 songs), (Troy 196), Albany: Troy Records, 1996 (with Robert Osborne, bass-baritone, and Malcolm Halliday, pianist; John Yaffé, producer).
- I Will Lift Up Mine Eyes – The Roberts Wesleyan College Chorale & Roberts Wesleyan Brass Ensemble, Robert Shewan, conductor – (Troy 238), Albany NY: Troy Records, 1997
- Leo Sowerby: American Master of Sacred Song – Gloriae Dei Cantores, Elizabeth Patterson, conductor; David Chalmers, James E. Jordan, jr., organists – Orleans MA: Paraclete Press, (GDCD 016), 1994
- Organ Music of Leo Sowerby (Symphony in G, Requiescat in pace, Fantasy for Flute Stops) – Catharine Crozier, organ – Chatsworth CA: Delos International, (D/CD 3075), 1988
- Leo Sowerby: Works for Organ and Orchestra (Classic Concerto, Medieval Poem, Pageant, Festival Music) – David Craighead, David Mulbury, organ; The Fairfield Orchestra, John Welsh, conductor – NAXOS 8.559028
- Violin & Organ, The Murray/Lohuis Duo (Poem) – Robert Murray, Violin, Ardyth Lohuis, organ – Richmond, VA: Raven Recordings, (OAR 200), 1991
- Rondo, Works for Violin & Organ, Vo. 2 (Ballade) – Robert Murray, Violin, Ardyth Lohuis, organ – Richmond, VA: Raven Recordings, (OAR 230), 1993
- Leo Sowerby: Music for Violin and Piano (Sonata in B-Flat, H165; Sonata in D, H 367; Two American Pieces, H 174) – Robert Murray, Violin; Gail Quillman, Piano – New York, NY: Premier Recordings, Inc., (PRCD 1049), 1995
- All American, Works for Violin and Organ, Volume 5 (Elevation, H 66) – Robert Murray, Violin, Ardyth Lohuis, organ – Richmond, VA: Raven Recordings, (OAR 650), 2003
- Leo Sowerby: The Paul Whiteman Commissions & Other Early Works (Synconata, H 176a, Symphony for Jazz Orchestra, H 178) – Andy Baker Orchestra, Avalon String Quartet, Winston Choi, Piano – Chicago, IL: Cedille Records, (CDR 90000 205), 2021
- Trios from the City of Big Shoulders, Lincoln Trio, Cedille CDR90000203 (2021), includes Trio for violin, violoncello and pianoforte, H. 312 (1953)
