= Antonio Dixon =

Antonio Dixon may refer to:

- Antonio Dixon (American football)
- Antonio Dixon (songwriter)

== See also ==
- Tony Dixon (disambiguation)
- Antonie Dixon, New Zealand thief and murderer
