= How to Dad =

New Zealand Internet personality (born 1988)

- Watson in 2016
- Born: Jordan Watson; 2 January 1988 (age 38)
- Spouse: Jody (m. 2012)
- Children: 3

YouTube information
- Channel: How to DAD
- Years active: 2015–present
- Genre: Comedy
- Subscribers: 1.5 million
- Views: 241 million
- Last updated: 5 September 2026

Jordan Watson (born 2 January 1988), better known as How to Dad, is a New Zealand YouTuber and Internet personality. In 2015 he began uploading tongue-in-cheek videos describing how to be a father, the first of which instructed viewers on how to hold a baby. In 2021 he co-founded the jandal company Golden.

== Early life and education ==
Watson was born on 2 January 1988. He was raised in Te Kauwhata, north of Hamilton. When he was eight, his parents divorced. At the age of 15, he moved in with his mother in Morrinsville, and he attended Morrinsville College. During his youth he enjoyed rugby. At the suggestion of a career advisor, when he left college he began studying radio at the Bay of Plenty Polytechnic. At the first day there he met a woman named Jody, who later became his wife. After two months of dating, Watson began living with her in Auckland.

== Career ==
For some time Watson worked on the television series Eating Media Lunch, The Unauthorised History of New Zealand, Let's Get Inventin' and Jono and Ben.

=== Social media ===
Watson in 2016 with his first book

Watson created his first How to Dad video in 2015. It was a tongue-in-cheek description of seven methods of holding a baby, with names for each of them, such as "The Standard Shoulder Hold", "The Dance Partner" and "The Other Dad's Superman Hold". He uploaded this video to his friend's Facebook page, and within 10 hours it had received 250,000 views. Several videos with similar topics ensued, such as "How to travel with a baby" and "How to get a baby to clean the house". Watson has described his portrayal of himself in his videos as "just a typical Kiwi dad. Kind of taken to the extreme in the DIY style". His first brand deal was with Tourism Rotorua in 2016, and he has since done brand deals with other companies such as McDonald's (to promote the Kiwiburger) and The Warehouse. The same year he signed a book deal. In about 2017 Watson left his job to work as a full-time YouTuber. In 2018 he expressed his dislike of the terms "YouTuber" and "social media influencer", stating that they make him think of a "cocky little teenager whose rich daddy bought him some fancy camera gear and now he has millions of subscribers and is making ridiculous money through being a douche online".

In 2019 Watson uploaded a non-serious audition video for joining The Wiggles. In May 2020 he created a cooking YouTube series with HelloFresh, named "How to Dinner". It features several New Zealand celebrities, such as Suzanne Paul. By 2023 he had uploaded 600 videos and had over 422 million views across YouTube and Facebook. In 2023 he was earning about $3,000 per month from YouTube, excluding revenue from brand sponsorships. He told The New Zealand Herald that year that "I can't live off my YouTube money". In 2023 he was uploading about two videos per week on his How to DAD channel.

In late 2021, Watson co-founded the jandal company Golden, designed to prevent jandal straps from disconnecting from the sole. They do this by placing a replica bread clip at the end of the strap, and under the sole, so the strap cannot pop out. As of 2023 Watson owns 20% of the company. He has made several videos about jandals promoting the product, such as in 2023 when he uploaded a YouTube video in which he unofficially broke the Guinness World Record for the fastest 100 metre sprint in jandals.

=== Television and web series ===
In August 2020, a six-part television series called Last Man Standing was released, hosted by Watson and the comedian Melanie Bracewell. In the series, fathers compete on telling the best dad jokes. In 2026 the web series Out of my League was released on RNZ video and YouTube. In each of the six 10-minute episodes, he trains with and competes against olympic athletes, such as Dame Lisa Carrington, in their respective sports.

== Personal life ==
In 2012, Watson married his wife Jody. In August 2017, Watson announced that he and his wife were expecting their third child. He also made a video instructing people how to announce new children. In about 2019 he became an ambassador for the charitable trust KidsCan. In 2019 Watson and his wife moved to Tauranga, his wife's hometown, and they became first home buyers in the process. As of 2024 they lived in the suburb of Papamoa.
