= LMNOP =

LMNOP are the twelfth through sixteenth letters of the ISO basic Latin alphabet and may refer to that alphabet as a whole.

LMNOP may refer to:

- A verse in "The ABC Song"; they are spoken twice as fast as the rest of the letters.
- Elemeno P, a New Zealand rock band
  - Elemeno P (album), the band's third studio album
- Ella Minnow Pea, a novel by Mark Dunn
- Elemeno Pea, a play by Molly Smith Metzler
