= Great Southern Television =

New Zealand production company

- Industry: Film and Television Creation, Financing and Production. Studio Facilities.
- Founded: 2002
- Headquarters: Auckland / Sydney
- Key people: Cate Calver (CEO); Philip Smith (CCO); Vicky Maples (CFO); ); Kathleen Anderson (Head of Drama); Adrian Stevanon (Head of Factual); Cass Donaldson (Head of Production)
- Products: Film, drama, factual, reality, comedy, entertainment and documentary
- Owner: Philip Smith, Leanne Malcolm
- Website: greatsouthern.tv

Great Southern Television (GSTV) is a film and television production company based in Auckland, New Zealand.

== History ==
GSTV was launched in 2002 by former journalist Philip Smith, and retailer Sir David Levene. The company is now fully owned by Smith. It is represented by CAA.

Since launching in 2002, the company has produced 46 factual series, 13 drama series, 10 comedy series, two feature films and two short films, winning 103 local and international television awards.

== Activities and content ==
The company operates both scripted and unscripted departments and in 2023 has series with several major international broadcasters and streamers, including Netflix, the BBC, AMC (USA) and HBO Max.

Domestically it has series on TVNZ, TV3 (Warner Bros. Discovery) and Sky, and in Australia its work is broadcast on SBS, Foxtel and Channel 7.

The GSTV drama department has produced 13 drama series and two feature films, and in 2023 has three dramas in full production including Friends Like Her (Discovery, Fifth Season); Brokenbacks (Sky, Hattrick) and Noob (Sky, Oble). It runs a development slate of 12 drama projects and has a team of five drama specialists.

The GSTV factual department has recently produced the adventure reality series Tracked for Discovery and HBO Max, and also makes the multi award-winning series the Casketeers (TVNZ, Netflix, SBS). It runs a slate of 20 development projects and has team of four factual executives.

The company also produces current affairs, making the acclaimed weekly Maori Current Affairs show, The Hui, for TV3 (Warner Bros Discovery).

The company has full service studios in Mt Eden, Auckland, and provides international drama production services.

Between 2015 and 2026, GSTV also produced a Māori current affairs show called The Hui, which is hosted by Julian Wilcox. On 6 November 2026, GSTV confirmed that The Hui would air its final episode on 7 December 2026 after the Māori broadcasting funding agency Te Māngai Pāho ceased providing financial support due to budgetary constraints.

== Productions ==
=== Drama ===
- The Kick (2014) Telefeature
- Agent Anna (2013-2014) Series 1-2
- The Cult (2009) Series 1
- Bogan Brothers (2009) Series 1
- The Pretender (2007-2008) Series 1-2
- Why Does Love? The Exponents Story. (2017)
- Hillary (2016)
- The Basement (2020)
- One Lane Bridge (2020-2022)
- NZ Wars (2021, 2022, 2023)
- Jonah (2019) Mini series
- Friends Like Her (2023)
- nOOb (2023)
- Spinal Destination (2023)
- The Ridge [In Production] (2025)
- Blue Murder Motel (2026)

=== Comedy ===
- The Unauthorised History of New Zealand (2005-2008) Series 1-4
- The Millen Baird Show (2010) Series 1
- Feedback (2010) Series 1
- 1000 Apologies (2008) Series 1
- Eating Media Lunch (2003-2008) Series 1-8
- Back of the Y (2001-2008) Series 1-3
- The Spinoff 2018
- 2Tube
- Back of the Y - New Year Special
- Birdland
- n00b (2024–present)

=== Film ===
- Honk If You're Horny (Short)
- Show of Hands (Feature Film, Melanie Lynskey, Antony McCarten)
- Apron Strings (Feature Film)
- Babylon (Short)

=== Current affairs ===
- The Hui, 2016–present.

=== Factual / Reality / Entertainment ===
- Shearing Gang (2011-Current) Series 1-3
- Coast New Zealand (2015) Series 1
- Crayfishers (2015) Series 1
- Coast Australia (2013-2014) Series 1-2
- Drug Bust (2012-2013) Series 1-2
- Rescue 1 (2009-2012) Series 1-4
- The Claim Game (2011) Series 1
- Danger Beach (2010-2011) Series 1-2
- The Lion Man (2004-2007) Series 1-3
- Loggers
- The Casketeers
- Remarkable Vets
- Truth Files
- Real Escapes
- Kia Ora Good Evening
- Family, Faith Footy
- My Maori Midwife
- Village People
- The Casketeers on the Road
- The Hui
- The Check Up
- Million Dollar Catch
- Coast Australia
- Outward Bound
- The Apprentice
- Singing Bee
- Make the Politician Work
- Who Wants to be a Millionaire
- Taking Off
- NZ Wars
