= Antonie Dixon =

New Zealand thief and murderer

Antonie Dixon (1968 – 4 February 2009) was a convicted New Zealand thief and murderer. His most notorious crimes were committed in an 11-hour spree of violence in 2003 in which he completely or partially severed the hands or arms of two women with a Samurai sword, shot a man dead with a homemade sub-machine gun and kidnapped another man. Dixon acquired over 150 convictions, mostly for theft and burglary; he was imprisoned at least 14 times. His former girlfriend Simonne Butler said he used methamphetamine from at least 2001.

Dixon suffered horrendous abuse as a child, according to evidence given at his 2007 Appeal Court hearing. In prison he beat and attempted to gouge the eye of another inmate and pulled a weapon on his own lawyer. He took his own life in prison in 2009.

== Major violent crimes ==
Dixon attacked both of his partners, Renee Gunbie and Simonne Butler, with a Samurai sword at Pipiroa on 21 January 2003. Before the sword broke, Gunbie's left hand was completely severed and both of Butler's arms were partially severed. After stealing a vehicle and travelling to Auckland, Dixon fatally shot James Te Aute in Highland Park with a burst of ten bullets from a homemade sub-machine gun. He then took a man hostage and engaged in a standoff with the police. Eleven hours after he started, Dixon surrendered to the New Zealand Police. He used methamphetamine throughout the episode. Renee Gunbie lost her left hand; Simonne Butler's arms were both reattached.

=== Trials ===
During his trial, Dixon advanced a defence based primarily on insanity. Throughout much of the trial he bore a wild, wide-eyed look and an odd haircut. Photographs of this appearance featured in leading newspapers around the country. At the conclusion of the trial, he was convicted of murder, wounding, kidnapping, shooting at police and aggravated burglary; he was acquitted on five charges of attempted murder. For the murder, he was sentenced to life imprisonment with 20 years' minimum non-parole.

He appealed against his conviction to the Court of Appeal of New Zealand with several arguments. First, it was argued that the trial judge, Judith Potter, did not properly instruct the jury on the law relating to insanity. Second, it was argued that manslaughter should have been available to the jury as an alternative verdict to murder. On 7 September 2007 the Court of Appeal overturned Dixon's convictions and ordered a new trial.

The retrial began in June 2008 and concluded with a second guilty verdict on 30 July 2008. Dixon was remanded in custody pending a sentencing hearing set down for 5 February 2009. Dixon was reported to have made it known that he intended to appeal against the outcome of this second trial as well. A cousin named Andre Joel Wilkie Mail was later jailed for attempting to bribe a juror during Dixon's second trial.

== Death ==
Prison staff intervened quickly to subdue Dixon and avoid any injury to his lawyer Barry Hart after Dixon made moves to attack Hart. Corrections Minister Judith Collins was informed of the incident and ordered a full report. She also encouraged Hart to lay a complaint with police. Hart chose not to lay a formal complaint as he felt that his client was suffering from severe mental health issues. On National Radio on the afternoon of 4 February, Hart denied that an attack had happened at all, refusing to speak further about it with the interviewer.

At 10:30 PM on 4 February 2009, the night before his scheduled re-sentencing, Dixon was found dead in his cell at Auckland Prison. It was reported the next morning that he had died of self-inflicted injuries. An inquest confirmed that Dixon's death was self-inflicted.

== Dixon in popular culture ==
Due to the nature of the crimes and the prominence of the trial, images of Dixon took root in the public psyche. Some aspects of the crime, such as Gunbie's severed hand giving the bird, or the use of the homemade sub-machine gun and claims of being followed by 747s, were viewed as humorous.

- On the television programme Eating Media Lunch, cast members could be seen wearing T-shirts with an unflattering portrait of Dixon's face printed on them. A shot of Dixon with his notorious facial expressions and haircut also features in the shows opening credits.
- On an episode of Bro'town, Vale Pepelo described "upside-down b" (P is a common slang term for 'Pure' (methamphetamine)) as "that highly addictive drug that makes you cut off peoples hands!" a reference to the Dixon case.
- Deja Voodoo referenced the case in their song "P" with the lyrics "I smoked P and I didn't cut anybody's hands off".
- Craccum, the Auckland University Students' Association magazine, referenced "Antonie Ronnie" (as his name was commonly misspelled) Dixon in issue 9, 2007, saying that Dixon had made his hairstyle "...the most popular haircut in West Auckland since the mullet."
- In August 2008, it came to light that a MySpace page attributed to Dixon had been created with the help of an unknown third-party outside prison.
- The name of indie band Cut Off Your Hands references Dixon's crimes.
- Hip hop artist Cyphanetik referenced Dixon's crimes in the song "Misfits My Bitches" - "Write another diss and I'll find the hands the writ them / chop them motherfuckers straight off like Antonie Dixon".
- In 2011, a television comedy series Hounds renamed a racing greyhound from Lundybainwatson to Lundydixonwatson after David Bain's lawyer, Joe Karam complained to the network, citing bad taste and a possible defamation lawsuit. Writers and producers The Down Low Concept had named the dog after three infamous and controversial New Zealand murder cases due to the original owner of the dog being a high court judge. The name referred to the cases of Mark Lundy, Scott Watson and the recently acquitted David Bain. At the behest of the network the production company re-shot and re-recorded audio in the few scenes where the dog's name was mentioned, the Dixon in the name referring to Antonie Dixon.
