= Anthony Ellison =

New Zealand cartoonist and animator

- Born: 1966 (age 59–60); New Zealand
- Occupations: Cartoonist; Animator

Anthony Ellison (born 1966) is a New Zealand cartoonist and animator.

Ellison is of Māori descent, from the Ngai Tahu iwi.

Ellison has been the political cartoonist for The Sunday Star-Times since 1988 and was at one stage the youngest political cartoonist in New Zealand. His cartoons addressed Māori issues but did not stereotype Māori and women. Frustrated by the limitations of the medium, Ellison abandoned political cartooning and began a bizarre weekly cartoon 'Meantime' for the New Zealand Listener. 'Meantime' survived two changes of editor before being dropped by the current editor who favoured a more conservative approach to the magazine.

Ellison created the character Media Dog for the media satire show Eating Media Lunch and also created the 1920s pastiche Happy Hori for the comedy show The Unauthorised History of New Zealand. According to an interview with Chris Slane, Ellison does not use story boards for his animations, "just writes a script, takes it into the recording studio and sees what happens".

In 2005, Ellison made his first foray into live-action comedy with the one-off television pilot 'Barry'. New Zealand Listener TV critic Diana Witchel describes Ellison's television work as representing "some of the most disturbing material on television this side of Destiny TV" and goes on to say that 'Barry' "as comment on the pretensions of the intelligentsia, the gullibility of the media and the stunning incomprehensibility of late-night innovative comedy, it's a triumph." In addition to editorial cartoons he has also published adult minicomics, including 'Popeye has a Fuck' (1977),'Tard' (1998), and 'Ray Gun Girls' (1999), which Pavement has described as "An unsettling mixture of Japanese school-girl eroticism, fifties ray-guns and haunting landscapes".
