= Back in Brown =

Studio album by Deja Voodoo
- Released: 2006
- Genre: Hard rock
- Label: Liberation Music

Deja Voodoo chronology
Brown Sabbath (2004)	Back in Brown (2006)

Professional ratings
Review scores
Source	Rating
Punk TV	7/10 stars
Critic	6.5/10 stars

Back in Brown is the second studio album by New Zealand band Deja Voodoo that was released in 2006. It reached number 20 on the New Zealand album chart.

== Track listing ==
1. "Team Police"
2. "Can't Do (What I Wanna Do)"
3. "Shotgun"
4. "Auckland Girls" (feat. Foamy Ed)
5. "Weed On"
6. "Frat Nation"
7. "Light The Fuse"
8. "Tracy"
9. "Society (Why Me)?"
10. "History Never Deletes"
11. "Noise Control"
