= Morrinsville College =

Secondary school in New Zealand

Location
- Alexandra Avenue; Morrinsville 3300; New Zealand; 37.650826°S 175.534069°E

Information
- Funding type: State
- Ministry of Education Institution no.: 126
- Principal: Scott Jenkins
- Years offered: 9–13
- Gender: Coeducational
- Enrolment: 758
- Socio-economic decile: 6N
- Website: http://www.morrcoll.school.nz

Morrinsville College is a state secondary school located in Morrinsville, Waikato, New Zealand. The school has a roll of approximately 758 students from years 9 to 13 (approx ages 13 to 18) as of July 2026.

The school dates back to 1923 when Morrinsville School (established 1877) opened a secondary department and became Morrinsville District High School. The district high school was split into separate primary and secondary schools in 1950, forming the current Morrinsville School and Morrinsville College.

== Enrolment ==
As of July 2026, Morrinsville College has a roll of 758 students, of which 197 (26.0%) identify as Māori.

As of 2026, the school has an Equity Index of 481, placing it amongst schools whose students have above average socioeconomic barriers to achievement (roughly equivalent to decile 4 under the former socio-economic decile system).

== Notable alumni ==
- Jacinda Ardern – former prime minister of New Zealand
- David Mitchell – architect
- How to DAD – Internet personality
- Vaughan Smith – current radio presenter ZM Fletch, Vaughan and Hayley
