= Jeremy Wells =

New Zealand broadcaster (born 1977)

- Born: 19 January 1977 (age 49); Auckland, New Zealand
- Presenting career
- Station: Radio Hauraki
- Country: New Zealand
- Relatives: John Wells (father); Sheryl Wells (mother)

Jeremy Wells (born 19 January 1977) is a New Zealand media personality who hosts the Radio Hauraki breakfast show with Manaia Stewart, Seven Sharp alongside Hilary Barry, and Taskmaster New Zealand.

== Career ==
Wells first appeared on television in 1997 on MTV. He later appeared as Newsboy on Mikey Havoc's television show. Wells and Havoc went their separate ways when the show finished; Havoc fronting a show on TV3 and Wells hosting Eating Media Lunch on TVNZ. He also presented the satirical The Unauthorised History of New Zealand in 2005 and an episode of Intrepid Journeys in 2007. The New Zealand Listener described Wells' deadpan delivery as "newsnight-of-the-living-dead", saying he would be "compelling viewing reading the phone book."

Wells and Havoc satirically labelled Gore the gay capital of New Zealand in 1999, during Havoc and Newsboy's Sell-out Tour. Returning to town to cover the 2008 election, Wells was confronted by 15 men angry over the comments. The group started harassing him at a petrol station, and followed him back to his hotel room, where he was trapped for 90 minutes until the police were called. Gore District Mayor Tracy Hicks said Wells was "either very brave or very stupid" for coming back.

Wells became the subject of controversy multiple times in relation to episodes of Eating Media Lunch, a satirical news show he hosted. One episode spoofed the current affairs programme Target, which often used hidden cameras to catch unreliable tradespersons or workers. The spoof depicted two actors as Target camera technicians in someone else's home, caught on hidden camera in acts such as masturbation, defecation (on a kitchen stove), drug use and phone sex. One technician stripped naked, covered himself with cling wrap, and appeared to urinate on the other technician. Several viewers complained but, in March 2004, the BSA (Broadcasting Standards Authority) of New Zealand found the episode had not breached any guidelines. In 2005, Wells was awarded a Bravo award by the New Zealand Skeptics for his "scathing look at the psychic and medium business on Eating Media Lunch".

Wells spent 23 days travelling with the 108 members of the New Zealand Symphony Orchestra in October 2010 and produced a documentary The Grand Tour, a product of his own interest in classical music. The programme contains several interviews with the musicians and support crew, including Dame Kiri Te Kanawa.

Wells co-hosted The Saturday Special with Steve Simpson on bFM; the show continued when both hosts moved to Radio Hauraki. In 2014, Wells changed shows to become a co-host of the Radio Hauraki breakfast show alongside Matt Heath and Laura McGoldrick. McGoldrick left the show in late 2015. In 2016, Wells and Heath were the subject of widespread controversy after broadcasting a conversation with English cricketer Ben Stokes' mother despite having told her she was not live on air and were temporarily suspended as a result. Heath left the show in 2024 and now co-hosts Newstalk ZB's Afternoons alongside Tyler Adams; Manaia Stewart has cohosted alongside Wells since early 2025.

Since 2018, Wells has co-hosted TVNZ's Seven Sharp with Hilary Barry. Wells has been the host and titular Taskmaster of Taskmaster New Zealand, the New Zealand version of the TV series Taskmaster, since 2020, with Paul Williams as the Taskmaster's assistant.

In November 2020, he was named one of the best dressed men in show business on David Hartnell MNZM's Best Dressed List.

== Personal life ==
Wells was born in Auckland, New Zealand, the son of sports administrators Sir John Wells and Sheryl, Lady Wells. He was expelled from the exclusive Wanganui Collegiate School in his sixth-form year for giving marijuana oil to a recovering drug addict, and later attended St Paul's Collegiate in Hamilton.

== See also ==
- List of New Zealand television personalities
