= The Devil Dared Me To =

- Directed by: Chris Stapp
- Written by: Chris Stapp; Matt Heath
- Produced by: Matt Heath, Karl Zohrab
- Starring: Chris Stapp; Matt Heath; Bonnie Soper; Dominic Bowden
- Music by: Peter Hobbs
- Release date: 11 October 2007
- Running time: 77 minutes
- Country: New Zealand
- Language: English

The Devil Dared Me To is a New Zealand film written by and starring Chris Stapp and Matt Heath. The film revolves around a fictional stuntman, Randy Cambell, who aspires to be the greatest living New Zealander in that profession. The character was first developed as the stuntman in Stapp and Heath's Back of the Y Masterpiece Television.

Stapp told the New Zealand Listener: "Our aim is to make the greatest New Zealand film since Goodbye Pork Pie".

The film was released in theatres across New Zealand on 11 October 2007. The film grossed $93,950 after four days on 35 screens to rank sixth on the week's box office top 20; after seven days, it had earned $127,320, and earned another $52,000 over Labour Weekend.

== NZFC support ==
In May 2006, Devil Limited Ltd received a total of $859,314 from the New Zealand Film Commission to produce the film. This included full blow-up from HD acquisition and sound-post to digital-dolby 35mm in support the film's NZ multi-plex release strategy.

== Release ==
The Devil Dared Me To had its world premiere at SXSW and screened at over 20 International Film Festivals. It has sold to Wild Bunch for the United Kingdom, Vivendi for the United States and Boll AG for the rest of the world.

The Devil Dared Me To is rated R16 in New Zealand for sex scenes, violence, drug use and offensive language.

== Cast ==
- Chris Stapp as Randy Cambell
- Matt Heath as Dick Johansonson
- Bonnie Soper as Tracy 'Tragedy' Jones
- Andrew Beattie as Spanner's Dad
- Phil Brough as Spanners Watson
- Ria Vandervis as Cindy Cockburn
- Dominic Bowden as Sheldon Snake
- Zach Baker as Kid Randy
- Nicholas Houltham as Kid Spanners
- Floyd Alexander-Hunt as Kid Tracy
- Ross Harper as Uncle Norm
- Cameron Rhodes as Butler
