= Eating Media Lunch =

New Zealand satirical television series

- Genre: News parody
- Created by: Jeremy Wells, Philip Smith, Paul Casserly
- Written by: Paul Casserly; Jeremy Wells; Philip Smith; Graeme Hill; Lee Baker; Steve Braunias; Wendyl Nissan
- Directed by: Paul Casserly; Lee Baker; Jonathan Brough
- Presented by: Jeremy Wells
- Country of origin: New Zealand
- Original language: English
- No. of series: 8
- No. of episodes: 52

Production
- Executive producer: Philip Smith
- Producers: Cass Avery; Paul Casserly; Claire Logan
- Editors: Phil Green; Jonathan Brough; John Cleave
- Running time: 30 min (including commercials)
- Production companies: Great Southern Television; TVNZ Production

Original release
- Network: TV2
- Release: 18 November 2003 – 21 November 2008

Eating Media Lunch (EML) is a satirical New Zealand news show hosted by Jeremy Wells. It aired on TV2 from 2003 to 2008. The show was frequently controversial during its run.

== Notable episodes ==
In 2005, it shocked some viewers when it depicted two newsreaders fornicating (a parody of Naked News). It frequently caused complaints to the Broadcasting Standards Authority, ranging from complaints about the show's treatment of New Zealand celebrities to complaints about an episode which showed a cat in a microwave oven (S4, E3, "Life After Death"). Producer Paul Casserly noted that portrayals of violence against animals were certain to attract complaints, such as the show which claimed to feature famous sheep Shrek being slaughtered, while the spoof Māori porn movie 'Anal Mana' saw no complaints.

== Innovations ==
The show features a regular animated segment by Anthony Ellison titled Media Dog which was available online. Since 2004 the series had included an annual 'awards' show which "honour[s] the absurd and the unusual as seen on television, radio and newspapers" categories include: "Services to Scaremongering, Worst Moment on Reality TV, The Inappropriate Touching Award and the much coveted New Zealander of the Year trophy."

The 2006 season featured former Close Up reporter Hugh Sundae as well as Matt Heath and Chris Stapp from Back of the Y. According to TVNZ the 2006 season tackled "racism, reality TV and the country's best-known protesters". The 2008 season won best comedy at the Qantas Film and TV Awards.

== Last season ==
In 2009 when TVNZ faced $25 million in budget cuts as a result of the recession and declining advertising revenue, the network made the decision not to commission a 2009 season of Eating Media Lunch.

== See also ==
- The Unauthorised History of New Zealand, satirical series also hosted by Wells
