= Tony Dixon =

Tony Dixon may refer to:

- Tony Dixon (Brookside)
- Tony Dixon (DJ) (1958–2010), Irish disc jockey
- Tony Dixon (American football) (born 1979), American football player
- Tony Dixon (biologist), British biologist and professor of ecology

== See also ==
- Antonie Dixon (1968–2009), New Zealand murderer
- Anthony Dixon (born 1987), American football player
- Boogie (rapper), real name Anthony Dixson (born 1989), American rapper
