= The Moment (New Zealand TV series) =

- Genre: Comedy; Sports
- Directed by: Samuel Capelin
- Presented by: Matt Heath; Mike Lane
- Opening theme: This is the Moment
- Country of origin: New Zealand
- Original language: English
- No. of seasons: 1
- No. of episodes: 7

Production
- Executive producers: Edward Kindred; Vicki Keogh
- Production locations: Studio 1A, TVNZ Studios; Auckland; New Zealand
- Running time: 30 Minutes
- Production company: TVNZ Productions

Original release
- Network: TVNZ Duke
- Release: April 5 – April 13, 2018

The Moment is a live television series on TVNZ Duke which was broadcast weeknights during the 2018 Commonwealth Games. The programme was presented by Matt Heath and Mike Lane.

The show chronicled the sports of the day with a New Zealand perspective, and featured comedic commentary over highlights of selected events.

Each episode featured a live cross to a 1News reporter. They included Peter Williams, Jenny-May Clarkson and Andrew Saville.
