= Matt Heath (actor) =

New Zealand radio host

- Born: Leslie Matthew Heath; 20 April 1972 (age 54); Oxford, England
- Occupations: Media personality, actor, musician

Leslie Matthew Heath is a New Zealand actor, producer, radio host, sports commentator, columnist and musician. He played Danny Parker on Back of the Y Masterpiece Television and Dick Johansonson in the feature film The Devil Dared Me To. He was guitarist and singer for the 2000s band Deja Voodoo. He has worked on shows for MTV2 in the UK and appeared on Eating Media Lunch. Heath previously hosted the Matt and Jerry Breakfast Show with Jeremy Wells on Radio Hauraki. He has been a columnist for The New Zealand Herald since June 2014 and provides cricket commentary for The Alternative Commentary Collective. Heath runs the motion graphics company Vinewood Animation Studios with Philip Brough. In 2018, he co-hosted The Moment with Mike Lane on TVNZ Duke throughout the 2018 Commonwealth Games. Heath is the author of a cookbook titled "The Best of Leslie's Kitchen".

== Personal life ==
Born on 20 April, Heath was given the first name Leslie as a tribute to his mother's favourite actor Leslie Nielsen. Co-host Jeremy Wells announced Heath's legal name on the Hauraki Breakfast Show, prompting Heath to acknowledge while his birth certificate says Leslie, he goes by the name Matt and would like an apology. As a result of this, several listeners of the breakfast show submitted parodied songs making fun of Heath's birth name.

In a Twelve Questions interview with the New Zealand Herald, Heath reveals his father Christopher Heath was in medicine, often referring to him as Doctor Heath during the Hauraki Breakfast radio show. Heath's mother taught languages at secondary level and he was the only boy in a family of 3 sisters.

Heath has two children, Charlie and Barry Heath, with Lani Purkis. In 2018, Heath mentioned on his radio show that he was no longer together with Purkis. They previously lived in the suburb of Mount Eden in Auckland.

== Television ==
Heath was a contestant in series 2 of Taskmaster NZ, a show hosted by his radio colleague, Wells. In 2023, Heath appeared on Guy Montgomery's Guy Mont-Spelling Bee. Heath also competed on the first series of The Traitors NZ, where he was named as one of the starting Traitors. He was banished in the fourth episode.
