= Chris Stapp =

New Zealand actor, director and musician

Chris Stapp is a New Zealand actor, director and musician best known for his role as stuntman Randy Cambell in Back Of The Y Masterpiece Television. He and Back of the Y co-star Matt Heath appear in season 6 of Eating Media Lunch. In 2005 the pair also hosted a weekly radio show Thursday Drive on bFM. He appeared, again as Randy Cambell, in the first season of the British show Balls of Steel, and later in the film The Devil Dared Me To where Cambell is the central character.

Recently told the New Zealand Listener "our aim is to make the greatest New Zealand film since Goodbye Pork Pie."
