= Richie McCaw =

New Zealand international rugby union player (born 1980)

Richie McCaw ONZ
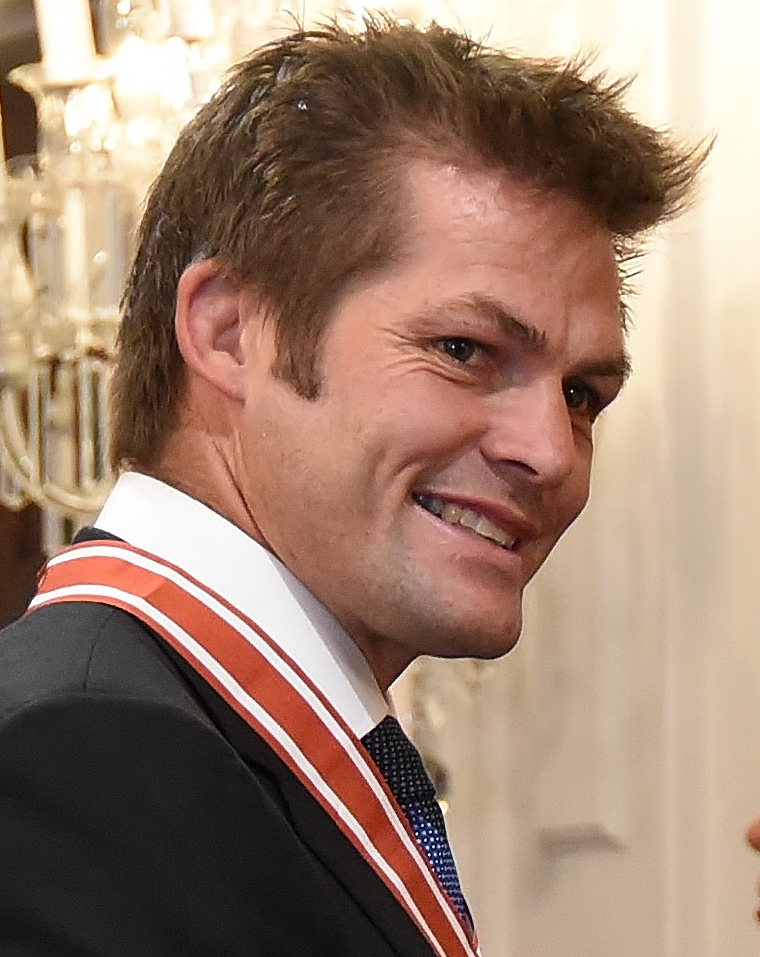
- McCaw in 2016
- Born: Richard Hugh McCaw; 31 December 1980 (age 45) Oamaru, New Zealand
- Height: 187 cm (6 ft 2 in)
- Weight: 107 kg (236 lb; 16 st 12 lb)
- School: Otago Boys' High School
- University: Lincoln University

Rugby union career
- Position(s): Flanker, Number 8
Senior career
Years	Team	Apps	(Points)
2000–2009	Canterbury	34	(50)
2001–2015	Crusaders	145	(135)
- Correct as of 1 April 2023
International career
Years	Team	Apps	(Points)
2000–2001	New Zealand U21	5	(15)
2001–2015	New Zealand	148	(135)
- Correct as of 1 April 2023

Richard Hugh McCaw ONZ (born 31 December 1980) is a New Zealand retired professional rugby union player. He captained the New Zealand national team, the All Blacks, in 110 out of his 148 test matches, and won two Rugby World Cups. He has won the World Rugby Player of the Year award a joint record three times and was the most capped test rugby player of all time from August 2015 to October 2020. McCaw was awarded World Rugby player of the decade (2011–2020) in 2021. McCaw is also a winner of the New Zealand sportsman of the decade award.

McCaw was the first All Black to reach 100 caps, and the first rugby union player to win 100 tests. He was the most-capped player in rugby union history with 148 caps, having overtaken Brian O'Driscoll's record in 2015 and losing the record to Alun Wyn Jones in 2020. McCaw has also equaled the record for most appearances at the Rugby World Cup, with Jason Leonard.

McCaw predominantly played in the openside flanker position for the New Zealand, Crusaders and Canterbury teams, but also played as a blindside flanker and no. 8. During McCaw's career, Canterbury won the NPC (later Mitre10 Cup) five times, and the Crusaders won four Super Rugby titles. In addition to winning two world cups, the All Blacks won seven Tri-Nations titles, completed three successful Grand Slam tours and won the Bledisloe Cup eight times.

He made his debut in 2001 for the Crusaders, and was selected for the All Blacks' 2001 end-of-year tour, despite having played only eight minutes of Super 12 rugby. His debut for New Zealand was against Ireland, where he was awarded man-of-the-match. McCaw became a regular selection for New Zealand, only missing a few games due to recurring concussions. In 2004 he was appointed captain of the All Blacks, whom he led at the 2007 Rugby World Cup. After their elimination in the quarter-finals, his captaincy came under criticism, but he was retained and eventually led the team to consecutive Rugby World Cup titles in 2011 and 2015, becoming one of only 43 players who have won the Rugby World Cup on multiple occasions. McCaw is however one of the two only captains to have won two Rugby World Cups, the other one being Siya Kolisi.

McCaw holds the international record for most game wins as a player at 131. He also holds the international record for most games as a captain at 110.

== Family and early years ==
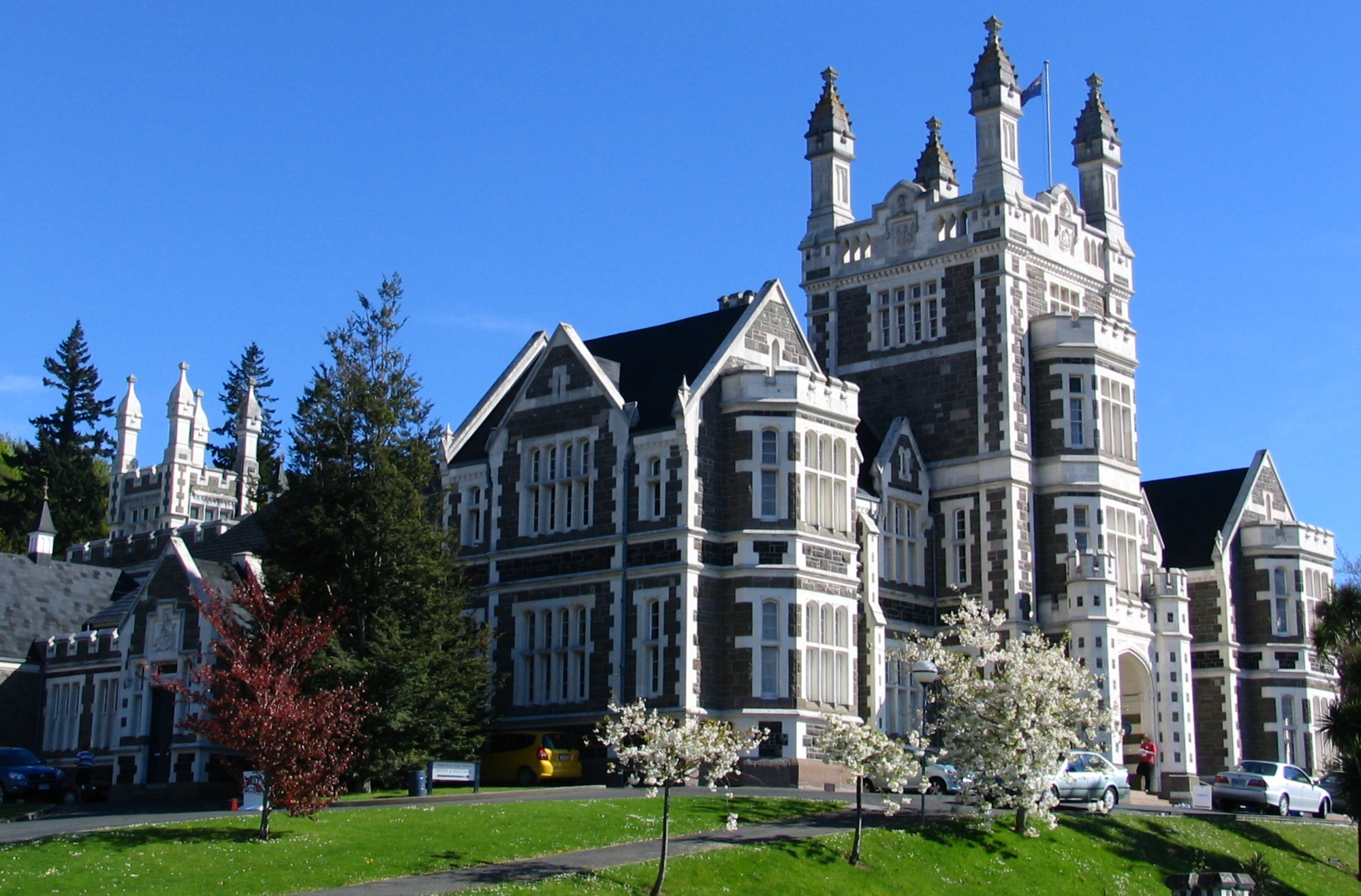
Otago Boys' High School, Dunedin. Richie McCaw boarded at the school from 1994 to 1998.

His paternal fourth great-grandfather was Seth Smith, who built large proportions of Belgravia & Mayfair in London in the 1830s, related through his great, great-grandmother Sarah Annette Seth-Smith McCaw. McCaw's great-great-grandfather immigrated to New Zealand from the Scottish Borders in 1893, and settled in the Hakataramea Valley, Waimate District, South Canterbury. McCaw's father took over the family farm and his mother was a teacher at Kurow.

On New Year's Eve 1980, Richard Hugh McCaw was born in the nearby town of Oamaru. He grew up on his parents' farm along with his sister Joanna. McCaw started flying gliders with his grandfather J H 'Jim' McCaw, a Tempest pilot during World War II credited with shooting down 20 V1 missiles, when he was nine years old. He played rugby for the local Kurow rugby club as a youngster, but it was not until 1994, when he boarded at Otago Boys' High School in Dunedin, that he started to take the game seriously.

In his last year at Otago Boys' High, McCaw was head boy, proxime accessit (runner up) to the dux and played in the school's 1st XV. McCaw came to the attention of national selectors during a 5-all draw with Rotorua Boys' High School in the 1998 New Zealand secondary schools rugby final in Christchurch. However, he failed to make the New Zealand Secondary Schools Team, losing out to Sam Harding, Angus McDonald and Hale T-Pole. With Sam Harding moving south to study at the University of Otago, McCaw headed to Christchurch's Lincoln University to study agricultural science and pursue his rugby interests. He achieved all but two papers for his Bachelor of Agricultural Science degree before deciding to pursue his rugby career instead. He received an honorary doctorate in recognition of his sporting achievements in April 2012.

In 1999, McCaw was selected in the New Zealand under-19 squad (coached by Mark Shaw), which won the world championship in Wales. During that series, McCaw realised his All Blacks dream could be attainable. The following year he was selected in the New Zealand under-21 squad and debuted for Canterbury in the National Provincial Championship (NPC) against North Harbour. On 31 March 2001, he made his Super Rugby debut with the Crusaders, playing a few minutes in a losing effort against the Hurricanes. That year he only played twice for the Crusaders, both times as a substitute, for a total of just eight minutes playing time. He did however play a full season with NPC champions Canterbury and captained the New Zealand Under 21s.

== Playing career ==
=== International debut ===
Although the then 20-year-old McCaw had only played seventeen matches for Canterbury, John Mitchell, the new All Black coach, selected him for the 2001 end of year tour to Ireland, Scotland and Argentina. This led Josh Kronfeld, a former All Black openside flanker, to criticise the selection: "You might as well just give All Black jerseys to everybody. The fact they picked guys off one NPC season is bloody incredible".

McCaw's debut international test was against Ireland at Lansdowne Road on 17 November 2001. His first touch of the game resulted in a knock-on when he was hit in a tackle and New Zealand were trailing the Irish 16–7 at half-time. In the second half the All Blacks recovered to win 40–29 and McCaw was named man of the match, receiving a standing ovation at the post-match function. A turning point came in the second half when McCaw was able to steal the ball from Ireland, which led to a try to left wing Jonah Lomu. After the match McCaw recalled the experience: "it was a hell of a stadium to play at, a real rugby stadium, a big crowd – something I'll always remember, very special."

McCaw played all three tests on the tour, with the All Blacks beating Scotland 37–6 and winning 24–20 against Argentina. At the end of season rugby awards, McCaw was selected as both the New Zealand Rugby Football Union Under-21 and Air New Zealand NPC Division One Player of the Year.

=== 2002–2003 ===
In the lead-up to the 2003 World Cup McCaw was a regular player for Canterbury, the Crusaders and the All Blacks. In 2002 and 2003 the Crusaders competed in the Super Rugby final, beating the Brumbies in 2002 and losing to the Blues in 2003. The Canterbury provincial rugby team lost the semi-final to the eventual winners Auckland in 2002. McCaw and the other All Blacks were "rested" during the 2003 national provincial championship.

In 2002 McCaw played for the All Blacks against the touring Ireland team (15–6 and 40–8 victories) and in the Tri Nations against Australia and South Africa. Of the six 2002 test matches McCaw played in, five were won by New Zealand with the only loss to Australia. The 14–16 loss occurred in New Zealand's third Tri Nations match and ensured the Bledisloe Cup stayed with Australia. During the All Blacks match against South Africa in Durban a pitch invader attacked Irish referee David McHugh as a scrum was being set, dislocating his shoulder in the process. McCaw and A.J. Venter wrestled the assailant off the referee and, according to McHugh, if they had not got involved his shoulder would have been broken. McCaw was rested, along with 20 other members of the Tri Nations squad, from the 2002 end-of-year tour to Europe.

In 2002 McCaw was voted as Newcomer of the Year by the International Rugby Players Association. This award is voted on by all international players, with players not allowed to vote for members of their own team.

After another successful campaign with the Crusaders in 2003 (reaching the Super 12 finals), McCaw was again selected as first choice openside flanker for the All Blacks. In June he was involved in a narrow 13–15 defeat at home to England, was a non-playing reserve in a 55–3 victory against Wales and played in a 31–23 win over France. The 2003 All Blacks retained the Tri Nations title, regained the Bledisloe Cup for the first time since 1997 and were ranked second behind England leading into the World Cup.

McCaw was selected as openside flanker for the 2003 All Blacks World Cup squad and played in every game at the tournament. New Zealand won all their pool games and beat South Africa in the quarter-finals to qualify for a semi-final match-up against Australia. In an upset, the Australians defeated the All Blacks, knocking them out of the tournament. At the end of the season awards McCaw received the Kel Tremain Trophy for the New Zealand Rugby Union player of the year.

=== 2004–2005 ===
The Crusaders finished as runner-ups in the 2004 Super 12 season, losing the final to the Brumbies. Following the World Cup, John Mitchell was dropped as All Black coach and replaced by Graham Henry. McCaw was selected as first choice openside flanker and made vice captain. In the first test against England he was escorted off the field after suffering concussion following a clash of heads with fellow All Black Xavier Rush. He was a late withdrawal from the second England test and then played 70 minutes against Argentina before again leaving the field due to dizziness. Still suffering headaches a month later, he withdrew from the rest of the home campaign and the 2004 Tri Nations to focus on recovery. McCaw returned to captain Canterbury to the finals at the tail end of the NPC season. In November 2004 he returned for the All Blacks' end-of-season tour to Italy, Wales and France. He was made captain at the age of 23 for the first time against Wales as regular captain Tana Umaga was rested.

In April 2005, while captaining the Crusaders, McCaw again suffered a concussion. He was stretchered off the field two minutes into the game after attempting a tackle on Bulls prop Richard Bands. After the incident, McCaw visited a young boy in hospital who had broken his neck playing rugby and started to question whether he should be playing the game. Another paraplegic in the ward told him he had broken his neck swimming on holiday in Fiji, convincing McCaw that it could happen anywhere, and you may as well "do what you enjoy". A month later, in May 2005, McCaw returned to training with the Crusaders and led them in their semi-final and final victories.

McCaw returned to international rugby in 2005, playing in the 91–0 victory over Fiji before the British and Irish Lions arrived. He then played the first two test against the Lions, including a record 48–18 victory in Wellington. The All Blacks defeated the touring Lions 3–0 in the series. McCaw was part of the successful Tri Nations campaign (losing just one game) and Grand Slam (when victory is achieved against the four home nations) end of year tour. He missed the game against England after suffering his third serious head knock against Ireland. Despite his injury concerns, McCaw was shortlisted for the 2005 IRB International Player of the Year, which was won by All Black teammate Dan Carter.

=== 2006–2007 ===
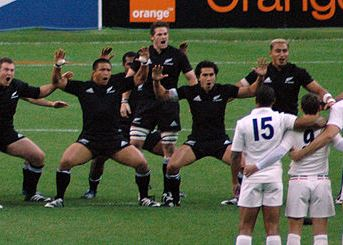
New captain McCaw leading a haka against France in 2006

McCaw led the Crusaders to the Super Rugby title again in 2006. In May 2006, at the age of 25 and after 36 test matches, McCaw was named captain of the All Blacks. His first two games as regular captain were against Ireland in New Zealand, while a separate squad led by Jerry Collins was named to travel to Argentina for a one-off game. McCaw started his captaincy with victory over Ireland and then mentored stand-in captain Jerry Collins in Argentina. New Zealand emerged as 2006 Tri Nations champions (the only loss away to South Africa by one point) and retained the Bledisloe Cup. A successful European tour saw comfortable victories against England, France twice and Wales. McCaw was captain in every match and after being short listed in 2002, 2003 and 2005 was named the 2006 IRB International Player of the Year.

Because 2007 was a World Cup year, All Black management decided that a select group of 22 players, including McCaw, would undergo "reconditioning" by not playing in the first seven rounds of the Super 14. McCaw returned to the Crusaders in the eighth round and helped them reach the semi-finals. New Zealand then beat a below-strength France team in two tests and won a one-off test against Canada. McCaw started on the bench for the Canadian match, with Reuben Thorne returning as captain. The Tri Nations was shortened because of the World Cup, with each team playing the other two teams twice (one home and one away game). Led by McCaw, New Zealand again dropped just one game (this time a five-point loss against Australia in Melbourne) retaining the Tri Nations crown and the Bledisloe cup.

==== 2007 World Cup ====
The 2007 World Cup was held in France, Scotland and Wales. The All Blacks were in a pool that included Italy, Portugal, Scotland and Romania. The All Blacks comfortably made it through the pool play with scores of 76–14, 108–13, 40–0 and 85–8 respectively. McCaw made just three appearances (two starts and one as a reserve) due to Henry's rotation policy. In the quarter-finals the All Blacks lost to France 18–20, resulting in New Zealand's earliest exit from a World Cup. With semi-final exits after being among the favourites at the 1991, 1999 and 2003 World Cups, they were once again accused of "choking on the world's biggest stage".

An emotional McCaw could not hide his disappointment at the after-match press conference: "If I knew the answers we would have sorted it out. We will be thinking about it for a long time". McCaw denied New Zealand's easy run into the quarter-finals played a part in the loss "A lot of the guys have been through this before, they've played big test matches." Graham Henry's policy of using squad rotation and resting key players during the Super 14 was criticised. McCaw also came under attack. He was accused of not inspiring his team, lacking the ability to change policy when plan A was not working and not providing enough leadership on the field.

=== 2008 ===
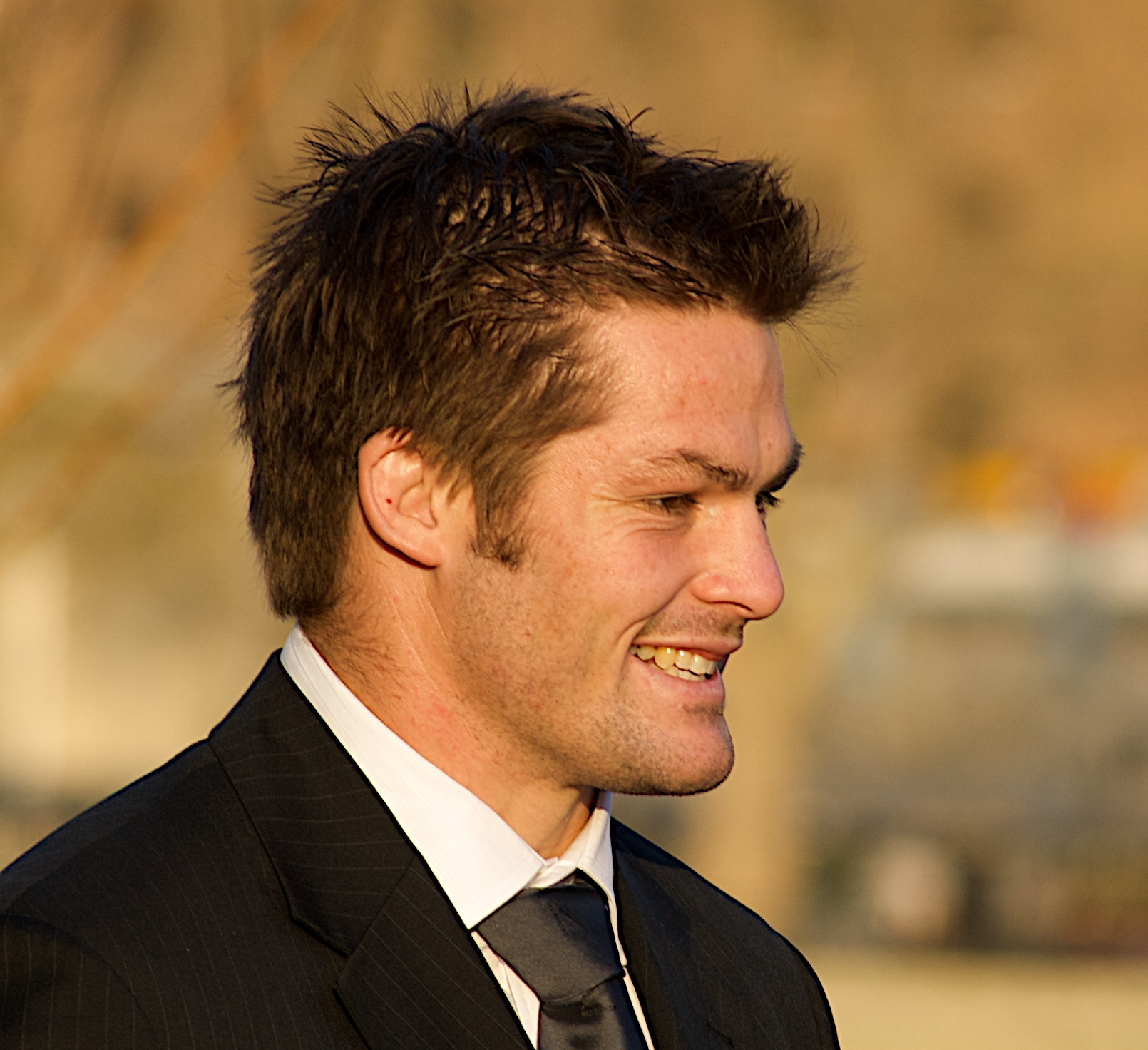
McCaw in London, 2008

Despite much speculation that Henry would lose the All Black coaching job to coach Robbie Deans, he was retained on a contract for the next two years, later extended to include the 2011 World Cup. He immediately stated that he would retain McCaw as his captain. Robbie Deans instead signed with the Australian Rugby Union, becoming head coach of Australia. In Deans' last season (2008) as Crusaders coach they won the Super Rugby title for the seventh time. Ireland and England toured to New Zealand in June 2008 and the All Blacks came away with a hard-fought win against Ireland, and two comfortable victories against England. McCaw tore a ligament in his ankle against England and missed the start of the Tri Nations.

Rodney So'oialo was made stand-in captain and started the Tri Nations with a win and two losses. McCaw returned for the fourth game and the All Blacks won the remaining three matches to retain the Tri Nations title and Bledisloe Cup. McCaw was seen as an inspiration after his return from injury, with Henry rating his performance in the 19–0 win in South Africa (the first time the South Africans had been kept scoreless on home soil in 105 years) as his best so far for the All Blacks.

In 2008 a fourth Bledisloe match was played in Hong Kong with the intention of expanding the game of rugby and in a close 19–14 game McCaw scored the match winning try. The Grand Slam tour to the United Kingdom and Ireland resulted in victories over Scotland (32–6), Ireland (22–3), Wales (29–9) and England (32–6). During 2008 McCaw won every test he captained and a total of 26 out of 28 games he played in at all levels. The All Blacks won 13 of a record 15 tests, retained the Bledisloe Cup and Tri Nations Trophy, completed the Grand Slam and reclaimed the world No. 1 ranking from South Africa.

McCaw finished 2008 by making his debut for the Barbarians against Australia at Twickenham in an 11–18 loss.

=== 2009–2010 ===
The Crusaders, under new coach Todd Blackadder, had a slow start to the 2009 season, losing four of their first five games. They recovered to finish fourth on the table, losing the semi-final at Loftus Versfeld to the Bulls. McCaw injured his knee and missed the start of the international season, returning for the Tri Nations tournament. South Africa beat the All Blacks in every match to win the title and regain the number 1 ranking, with New Zealand beating Australia three times to finish second. It was the first time New Zealand had not won the competition in five years and the fifth time since the Tri Nations started in 1996. A fourth Bledisloe Test against Australia was played in Japan before New Zealand toured Europe. Although New Zealand won every match on tour, an earlier loss to France and three defeats by the South Africans were the most suffered by the All Blacks in a season since McCaw joined the team in 2001. Despite the team's relatively poor season, McCaw was named the IRB International Player of the Year for a second time.

The 2010 season started in much the same way with the Crusaders finishing fourth during the round robin stage and losing to the Bulls in the semi-final. During the season McCaw played his 100th Super Rugby game in a losing effort against the Cape Town-based Stormers. New Zealand recorded victories over the touring Ireland and Wales teams, Ireland losing their match by a record 66–28 after number eight Jamie Heaslip received a red card for kneeing McCaw in the head. The All Blacks went through the Tri Nations undefeated with the final game of the tournament against Australia marking McCaw's 52nd time captaining the All Blacks, surpassing Sean Fitzpatrick as New Zealand's most-capped test captain.

The fourth Bledisloe Cup match was again scheduled for Hong Kong and Australia ended a ten match losing streak to the All Blacks. It was to be the only loss the All Blacks would suffer that season as they went on to win another Grand Slam tour, defeating England, Scotland, Ireland and Wales. In the match against Ireland McCaw, along with teammate Mils Muliaina played in their 93rd test match passing Sean Fitzpatrick to become the most capped All Blacks. At the end of the year McCaw was named the IRB International Player of the Year for the second successive season and the New Zealand sportsperson of the year at the Halberg Awards.

=== 2011 Rugby World Cup ===
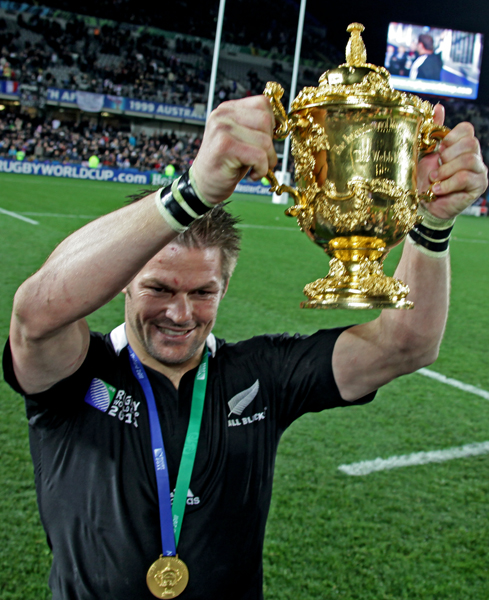
Richie McCaw holding the William Webb Ellis Trophy after the 2011 World Cup final

During preseason training in January 2011 McCaw injured his foot, subsequent x-rays revealed that he had received a stress fracture in the fifth metatarsal of his right foot. It was determined his best chance of recovery was to undergo an operation where a pin was inserted. As a result, McCaw missed the opening two months of the Super Rugby season. During the All Black's third Rugby World Cup pool match against France, McCaw became the first All Black to reach 100 test caps. However, it was also during this match McCaw re-aggravated his foot injury. In order to rest his injury, he was forced to skip the more physical aspects of training and miss the All Blacks' final pool match against Canada. Prior to the quarter-final against Argentina McCaw decided against having another x-ray. Following the re-occurrence of his injury it was uncertain whether McCaw could continue to play for the All Blacks, this forced the coaching staff to develop contingency plans and Matt Todd was called into the All Black training squad. McCaw was able to continue to play throughout the World Cup tournament and lifted the Webb Ellis trophy after a tense 8–7 victory over France. This was the lowest score in a final in World Cup history. After the final, the All Black coach Graham Henry stated "He can hardly walk and how he played today I just don't know," and he acknowledged the All Blacks probably would not have won without him. Following the World Cup x-rays showed that the screw in his foot, necessary to stop the deterioration of the original injury had caused a second fracture. The fracture again, required a further operation.

After the Rugby World Cup McCaw was selected in the RWC Dream Team. This team was determined by public vote, with over 160,000 votes cast. In addition, for the second successive year McCaw was named the New Zealand sportsperson of the year at the Halberg Awards.

=== 2012–2015 ===
Under new coach Steve Hansen, the All Blacks won 12 tests, drew one and only lost one test in 2012, as well as winning the new Rugby Championship with a 100% winning record. During this time McCaw overtook George Gregan for most times on the winning side with 94. He also recorded his 100th win against South Africa in Dunedin. McCaw was a nominee for the IRB Player of the Year award but lost out to teammate Dan Carter.

In the first half of 2013, in order to rest his body and improve his chances of playing in the 2015 Rugby World Cup McCaw enforced the sabbatical clause in his NZRFU contract. As a result, he only played the latter rounds of Super Rugby, and missed the 2013 French Test Series. He later returned to captain the All Blacks as they successfully defended the Rugby Championship. During this campaign, McCaw equalled (with Brian O'Driscoll of Ireland and John Smit of South Africa) the record as captaining the most test matches (83). McCaw subsequently overtook this record when playing in Japan on 2 November 2013. Following the All Blacks victory over the Springboks in Ellis Park, McCaw has played and won at every major Rugby Test stadium. Along with Kieran Read, McCaw led the All Blacks to a perfect season in 2013, winning 14 out of 14.

McCaw captained New Zealand for the 100th time on 22 November 2014 in the end of year international against Wales. He is the first rugby union player to achieve 100 caps as captain. On 15 August 2015, McCaw surpassed Ireland's Brian O'Driscoll world record, as the most capped rugby player when he won his 142nd cap against Australia in the Bledisloe Cup. He would go on to hold this title for five years until 31 October 2020 when Welsh captain Alun Wyn Jones got his 149th cap.

On 31 October 2015, McCaw captained New Zealand to retain the Rugby World Cup after a 34–17 win against Australia in the final at Twickenham. This match was the thirteenth Rugby World Game as captain and is the current world record for this statistic. During the tournament he received a yellow card for foottripping in the opening game against Argentina. On 19 November 2015, McCaw announced his retirement from rugby.

=== Leading of haka ===
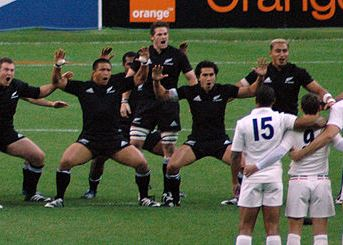
McCaw leading a reindition of the haka 'Ka Mate' against France

Despite McCaw often being captain in tests, he generally turned down the role of haka leader (kaea). He only served as the kaea in 11 tests, only when the All Blacks performed 'Ka Mate'.

== Playing style ==
McCaw predominately played at openside flanker, although he has played in the other "loose forward" positions of blindside flanker and number eight for the Crusaders. The openside flanker binds to the side of the scrum farthest from the touch-line and is usually one of the first players to reach a breakdown. In 2008, McCaw told the IRB:

"My main role as a flanker is, defensively, to tie in with the back line to ensure that the defence works well. On attack I think my primary role at first phase is to look after our ball. You attack the back line and I'm usually the first person there to make sure we secure that ball. Thirdly I put pressure on break downs and make sure I disturb their ball and try to turn their ball over."

McCaw has been described as the best openside flanker of all time. He has been awarded the IRB Player of the Year a record three times and has been nominated on eight occasions. When he received the IRB Player of The Year award for the third time former Australian lock and award chairperson John Eales described him as "an outstanding captain, a world class player and a role model for our sport". Along with Dan Carter, he is seen as one of the most influential members of the All Blacks. McCaw considers his ability to anticipate play as one of his most important skills.

Australian openside David Pocock, who was also shortlisted for the IRB award, admires the way he reads the game as well as his ability to read the referee. One of McCaw's strengths is his ability to re-invent himself. For example, he adapted quickly to changes in the breakdown laws (e.g., the 2008 the Experimental Law Variations (ELVS) and the 2010 New IRB Law Interpretations) and, over time, other areas of his game.

Not all agree with McCaw's playing style and many believe that he pushes the boundaries of legality. He has been labelled a "cheat" by both former South Africa coach Peter de Villiers and former Australian coach Bob Dwyer. Longtime Springboks lock Victor Matfield said in 2010 that the referees let "him get away with murder" at the breakdown. Shortly after the 2011 Rugby World Cup final, veteran France back-rower Imanol Harinordoquy criticised McCaw saying that "he played the whole match in our [Frances] camp." Former Australian coach Eddie Jones and flanker Phil Waugh say he does no more than any other good openside, but his skill at judging how the referee will interpret the breakdown is the main reason for his success. McCaw admits that he tests the referee early "to know what you can get away with" and that only an "idiot" would not adapt to their rulings.

Teammate Aaron Mauger, along with many New Zealand fans, have suggested that McCaw's influence and playing style has made him a target for illegitimate play. International players Phil Waugh, Jamie Heaslip, Marcus Horan, Lote Tuqiri, Andy Powell, Dylan Hartley, Quade Cooper, Dean Greyling, Kevin McLaughlin and Scott Higginbotham have been accused of making "cheap shots" on McCaw. He has even been on the receiving end from his All Black teammates when playing for the Crusaders, with Neemia Tialata, Jerry Collins and Ali Williams becoming frustrated with his play. According to McCaw "what happens on the field stays on the field" and if he gets extra attention it is because he "must be doing something right".

In 2012, Wallabies coach Robbie Deans and selectors wagered the potential returns in finishing games with two openside flankers on the field as a way to counter McCaw. In September 2012 after the All Blacks v South African Test in Dunedin, then South African coach Heyneke Meyer said that McCaw was the greatest rugby player the world has ever seen. Following the All Blacks win over Wallabies to claim their 3rd World Cup, All Blacks Coach Steve Hansen praised McCaw's and Dan Carter's career efforts, distinguishing McCaw from Carter:

“Richie is the best All Black we have ever had and Dan is a close second,” said Hansen. “The only thing that separates them is Richie has played 148 matches at flanker, which is unheard of - you put your body on the line every time you go there. The challenge for the other guys now is to try and become as great as him and Dan.”

== International record by opposition ==
Against	Played	Won	Lost	Drawn	Tries	Points	% Won
Argentina	10	10	0	0	1	5	100
Australia	37	29	6	2	11	55	78.38
British and Irish Lions	2	2	0	0	1	5	100
Canada	2	2	0	0	0	0	100
England	14	12	2	0	1	5	85.71
Fiji	2	2	0	0	0	0	100
France	13	12	1	0	1	5	92.31
Georgia	1	1	0	0	0	0	100
Ireland	14	14	0	0	0	0	100
Italy	3	3	0	0	4	20	100
Japan	1	1	0	0	1	5	100
Namibia	1	1	0	0	0	0	100
Romania	1	1	0	0	0	0	100
Scotland	7	7	0	0	1	5	100
Samoa	1	1	0	0	0	0	100
South Africa	26	20	6	0	6	30	76.92
Tonga	2	2	0	0	0	0	100
Wales	11	11	0	0	0	0	100
Total	148	131	15	2	27	135	88.51

== Playing achievements ==
Year	Canterbury (NPC) (Note: The competition was originally called the National Provincial Championship (NPC) until 2006. It was then split into two competitions, the Air New Zealand Cup and the Heartland Championship. Canterbury contested the Air New Zealand Cup, which was later renamed the ITM Cup due to a change in sponsorship in 2010 and since 2016 has been known as the Mitre 10 Cup.)	Crusaders (Super Rugby)	All Blacks (Tri Nations/ The Rugby Championship) (Note: The competition was called the Tri Nations from its formation in 1996 through 2011. It was renamed The Rugby Championship starting in 2012 when Argentina entered the competition.)	Awards	Career highlights
2001	Champions	10th (played only eight minutes)	Not selected (Note: The openside flankers selected in the Tri Nations squad were Taine Randell and Marty Holah. McCaw was not to make his All Black debut until the end of year tour, after the Tri Nations had finished.)	New Zealand Under 21 Player of the Year; NPC Division One Player of the Year	All Black debut
2002	Semi-finalist	Champions	Champions	International Rugby Players Association Newcomer of the Year	Perfect season with Crusaders
2003	Did not play	Finalist	Champions	New Zealand Player of the Year	2003 World Cup
2004	Champions	Finalist	Did not play due to injury	NPC Division One Player of the Year	Captain of Canterbury
2005	Semi-finalist	Champions	Champions		Captain of the Crusaders British and Irish Lions; Grand Slam
2006	Quarter-finalist	Champions	Champions	New Zealand Player of the Year; IRB International Player of the Year	Captain of the All Blacks
2007	Semi-finalist	Semi-finalist	Champions		2007 World Cup
2008	Champions	Champions	Champions		Grand Slam
2009	Champions	Semi-finalist	2nd	New Zealand Player of the Year; IRB International Player of the Year	
2010	Champions	Semi-finalist	Champions	IRB International Player of the Year; New Zealand Sportsman of the Year	100 Super Rugby caps Grand Slam; Most capped All Black captain Equal most capped All Black
2011	Champions	Finalist	2nd	New Zealand Sportsman of the Year	100 Test Caps; 2011 World Cup Champion
2012		Semi-finalist	Champions	New Zealand Player of the Year	100 test wins Most caps as captain
2013		Semi-finalist	Champions		'Perfect Year' (14 wins from 14 tests)
2014		Finalist	Champions		Most Test tries by a forward from a tier-one nation (24 tries) Most tries by any player against a tier-one opponent (11 tries against Australia) Victory at every major test rugby stadium
2015		7th	2nd		Most-capped international test player 2015 World Cup champion

== Personal life ==
In January 2013, it was reported that he had been seeing hockey player Gemma Flynn for the past six months. McCaw announced his engagement to Flynn in January 2016. They married on 14 January 2017. Their daughter was born in December 2018 and a second daughter in May 2021. Their third daughter Ella Mae was born in April 2023. In December 2024, McCaw's family said they were soon to move to Wānaka after 10 years living in Christchurch.

His other sporting passion is flying and he was made an honorary Squadron Leader in the Royal New Zealand Air Force in 2010 and was promoted to honorary Wing Commander in September 2016.

McCaw was taught to fly gliders by his grandfather J H 'Jim' McCaw who flew more than 300 missions in the Second World War. In 2009 he convinced the head of the Discovery network in Australia and New Zealand to do a show about gliding. They filmed McCaw gliding at Omarama on the extreme sports series Sportstar Insider, which was hosted by Australian former rugby league footballer Andrew Ettingshausen. After the 2010 Canterbury earthquake, he auctioned a personal flying lesson through Trade Me to raise money for the badly damaged Hororata St Johns Church. He also raised money for a young Samoan who broke his neck playing rugby and whose village was destroyed in the 2009 Samoa earthquake and tsunami. It was revealed at his retirement announcement in 2015 that McCaw would work at Christchurch Helicopters, where he is a Director and Shareholder, and was obtaining a commercial helicopter licence. McCaw has since obtained said licence and has continued working as a helicopter pilot. He flew several rescue and reconnaissance missions following the 2016 Kaikōura earthquake that struck the South Island. He also performed milk drops around rural areas of New Zealand while having an endorsement with Fonterra, in which his sister and her husband are dairy farmers.

In 2010, McCaw and Dan Carter were on an NZ$750,000 a year contract that saw them through to the end of the 2011 Rugby World Cup, making them the highest paid rugby players in New Zealand at the time. This contract would still have applied if they had not been selected for the World Cup squad.

== Honours and awards ==
In 2019, World Rugby inducted McCaw to its Hall of Fame, alongside Shiggy Konno, Os du Randt, Peter Fatialofa, Graham Henry, and Diego Ormaechea.

=== Order of New Zealand ===
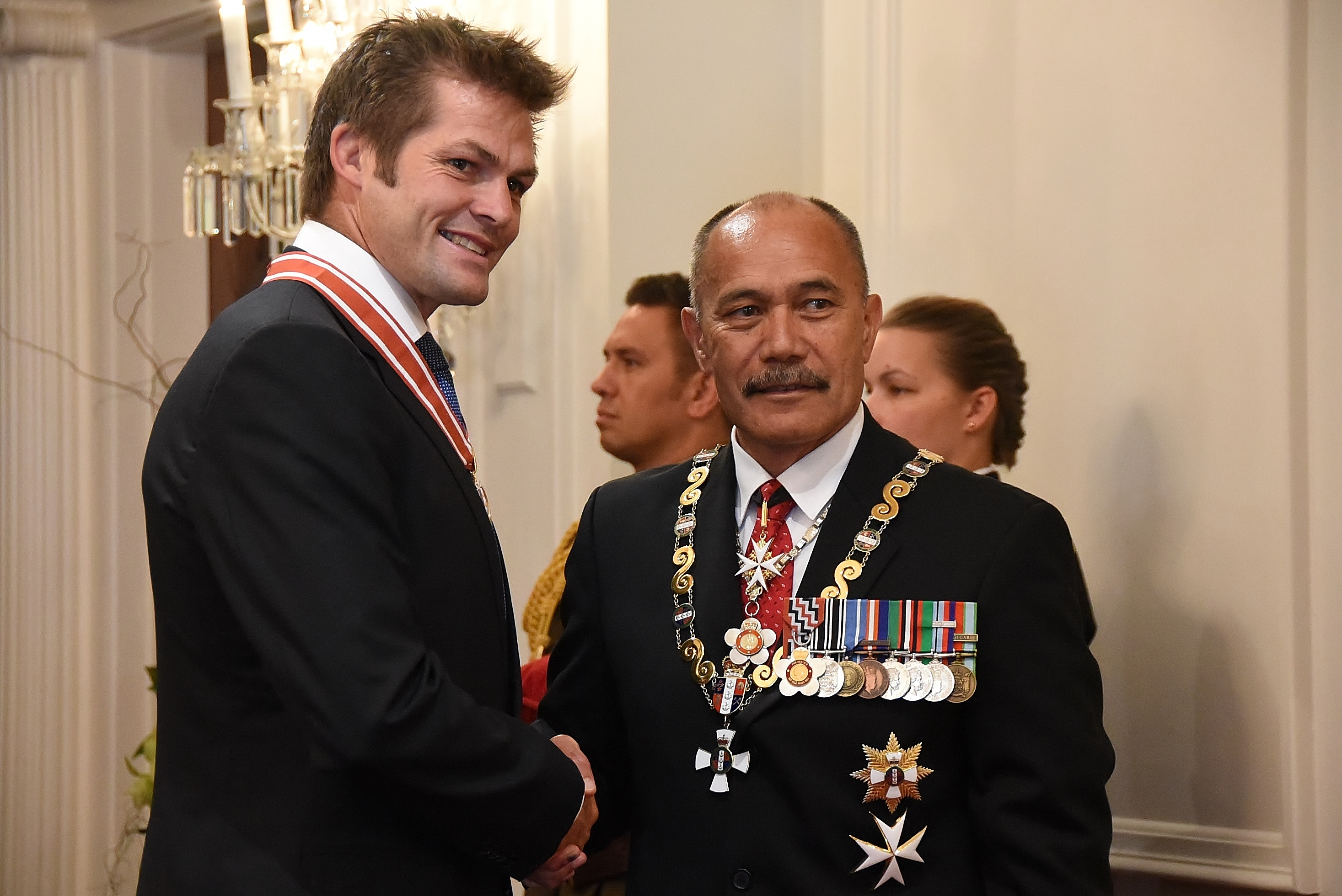
McCaw (left), after his investiture as a Member of the Order of New Zealand by the governor-general, Sir Jerry Mateparae, at Government House, Wellington, in April 2016

In December 2011, then Prime Minister John Key revealed that he had asked McCaw about the possibility of a knighthood in the 2012 New Year Honours, but that McCaw had turned it down. According to Key, "He made the call that he's still in his playing career and it didn't feel quite right for him, that day where he's no longer on the pitch may be the right time for him." No formal offer was ultimately made. McCaw was appointed a member of New Zealand's highest honour, the Order of New Zealand, in the 2016 New Year Honours. The honour surpassed the knighthood he had previously turned down prior to his retirement because only 20 living New Zealanders can gain membership at any one time. McCaw represented the Order in the Royal Procession at the 2023 Coronation.

== Notes ==
Awards
Preceded by Mahé Drysdale	New Zealand's Sportsman of the Year; 2010, 2011	Succeeded by Mahé Drysdale
Preceded by John Wells	Leadership Award; 2013	Succeeded by Barbara Kendall
Rugby union
Preceded by Tana Umaga	All Blacks captain 2006–2015	Succeeded by Kieran Read
Preceded by John Smit	IRB World Cup winning captain 2011, 2015	Succeeded by Siya Kolisi
