= Foamy Ed =

New Zealand pop punk girl band

- Origin: New Zealand
- Genre: Rock
- Years active: 1996–present
- Members: Fleur Parker; Mieke van der Walle; Aimee Banks; Lani Purkis; Katherine Millar

Foamy Ed is a New Zealand pop punk girl band.

They formed in high school in 1996, since then the band released their debut EP Go Where U Know in 2000 and another EP A Moment's Need. They have performed in the Big Day Out and many national gigs. They have also performed alongside huge international bands such as Blink 182, Pennywise, 28 Days, The Vandals, The 5.6.7.8's, Plain Sunset and BugGirl. New Zealand supports include; Fur Patrol, Elemeno P, HLAH, The Feelers, Sommerset and many more.

In 2003, Aimee left the band and Mieke was brought in to replace her on guitar. Aimee returned in 2004 to make Foamy Ed a five-piece.

Lani Purkis is currently in another band Elemeno P.

== Discography ==
Release date	Title
2000	Go Where U Know
2002	A Moments Need
