= John Wells (sports administrator) =

New Zealand businessman and sports administrator

Sir John Wells KNZM
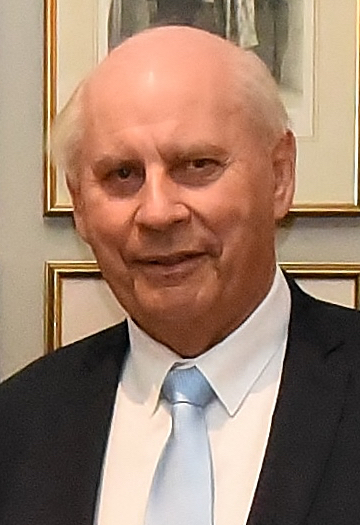
- Wells in 2017
- Born: Murray John Wells; 23 July 1943 (age 81); Whanganui, New Zealand
- Education: Auckland Grammar School
- Occupation: Merchant banker
- Spouse: Sheryl Jane Gavin (m. 1969)
- Children: 2
- Relatives: Jeremy Wells (son)

Sir Murray John Wells KNZM (born 23 July 1943) is a New Zealand businessman and sports administrator.

== Biography ==
Born in Whanganui on 21 July 1943, Wells was educated at Auckland Grammar School from 1957 to 1961. In 1969, he married Sheryl Jane Gavin, and the couple went on to have two children including broadcaster Jeremy Wells.

An associate chartered accountant, Wells was chief general manager of NZI Financial Corporation from 1980 to 1986. In 1987, he was appointed chairman of the Auckland-based merchant bank Bancorp Holdings. He has served as a director or non-executive chair of other companies, including Baycorp Holdings, Fisher Funds Management, Vector, and Aetna Health (NZ).

Wells is best known as a sports administrator. He was appointed to the New Zealand Sports Foundation in 1998, and chaired Sport and Recreation New Zealand (SPARC) between 2001 and 2009. Wells chaired boards organising the 2007 World Netball Championships in Auckland, the Auckland stopover of the 2011–2012 Volvo Ocean Race, and the 2012 ITU World Triathlon Series grand final in Auckland. He was a member of the New Zealand bid committee that won the hosting rights for the 2011 Rugby World Cup, and subsequently served on the Rugby World Cup establishment board. In 2011, he was appointed to the board of New Zealand Rugby.

== Honours and awards ==
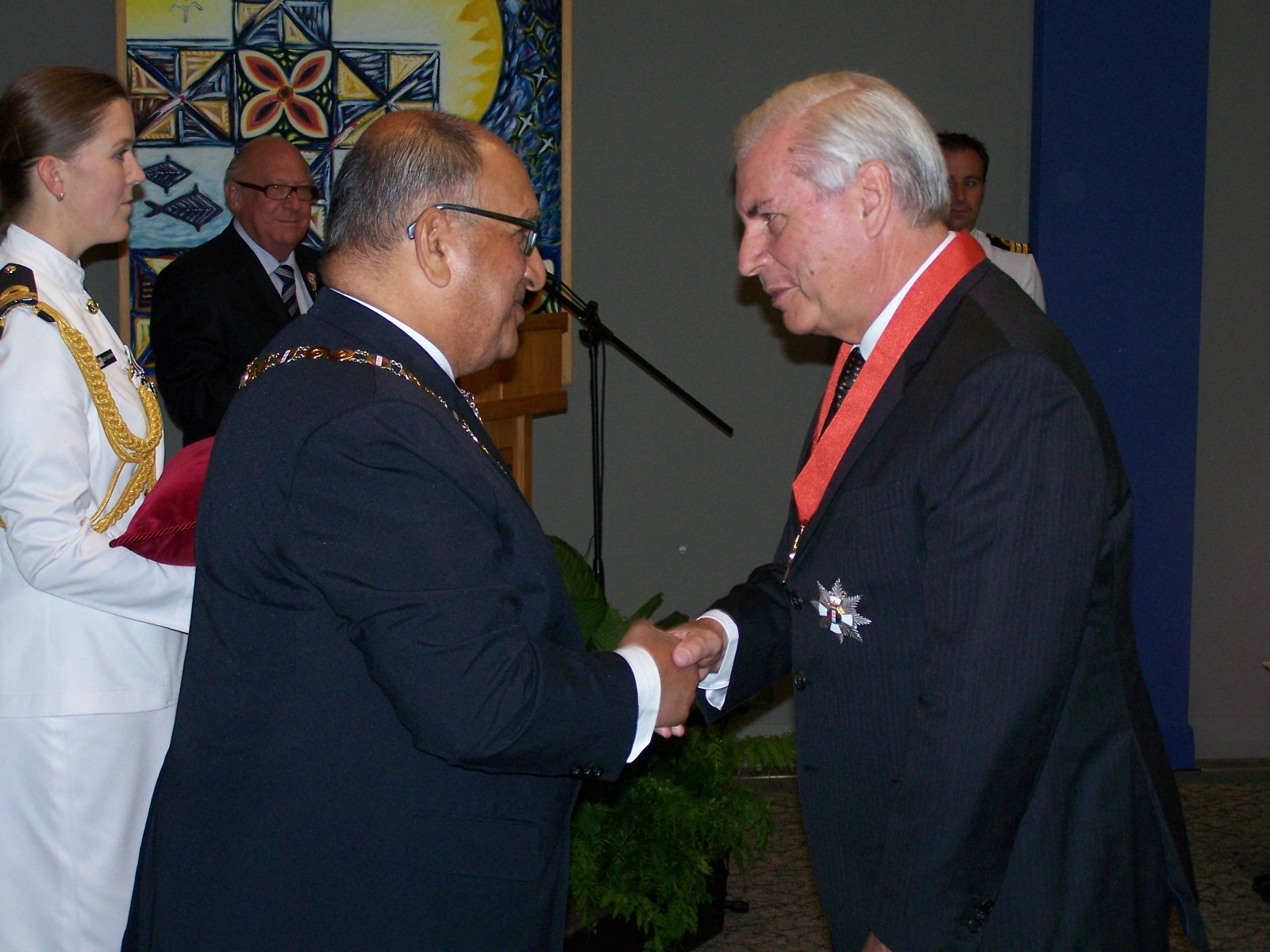
Wells (right) is congratulated by the governor-general, Sir Anand Satyanand, after being invested as a Distinguished Companion of the New Zealand Order of Merit at Government House, Auckland, on 1 April 2009

In the 2009 New Year Honours, Wells was appointed a Distinguished Companion of the New Zealand Order of Merit, for services to business and sport. A few months later, following the restoration of titular honours by the New Zealand government, he accepted redesignation as a Knight Companion of the New Zealand Order of Merit.

At the 2012 Halberg Awards, Wells received the Sports New Zealand leadership award, which recognises an individual who has displayed inspiring, focused and effective leadership in sport.

Awards
Preceded by Murray Halberg	Halberg Leadership Award; 2012	Succeeded by Richie McCaw
