= Sheryl Wells =

New Zealand sports administrator

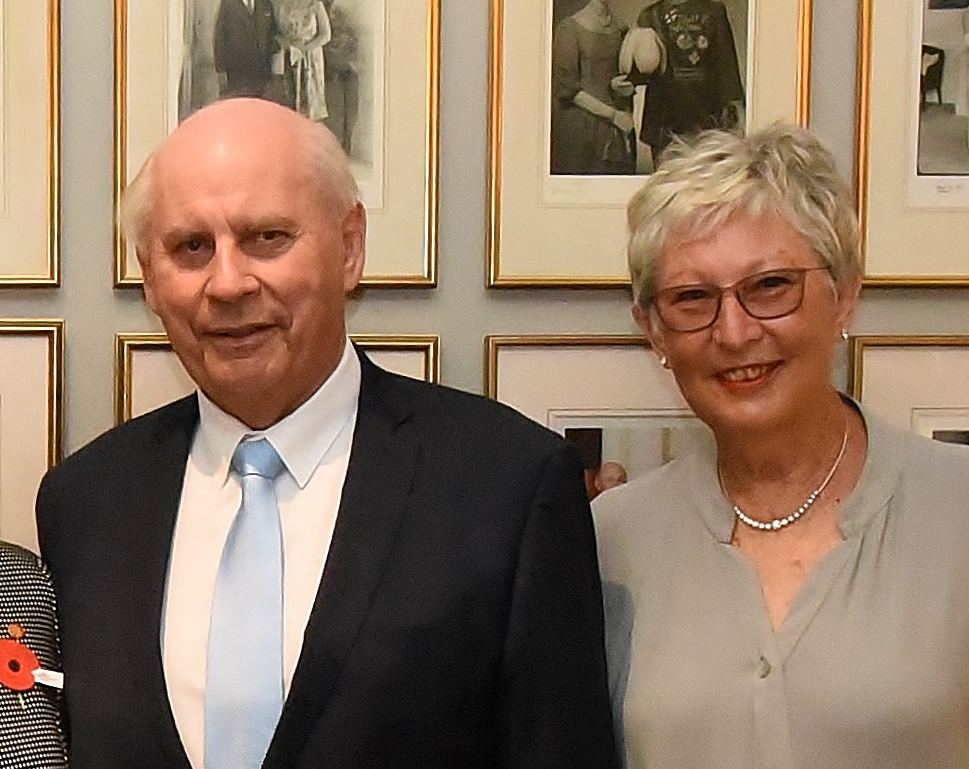
Sir John Wells, and Sheryl, Lady Wells, in April 2017

Sheryl Jane Wells, Lady Wells CNZM (née Gavin) is a New Zealand sports administrator. She is the former manager of the national netball team, the Silver Ferns, and the past president of Netball New Zealand.

== Biography ==
Wells was born in Auckland. She started playing netball in the 1960s. From 1992 to 2004, she was the team manager for the Silver Ferns, including for the 2003 World Netball Championships, which the Silver Ferns won. In 2010, Wells managed the LG Mystics in the ANZ Championship. In 2011 she was appointed president of Netball New Zealand for a three-year term.

=== Recognition ===
In the 2004 Queen's Birthday Honours, Wells was appointed a Companion of the New Zealand Order of Merit, for services to netball.

Wells was awarded the Alwyn Moon Memorial Trophy by the Auckland Amateur Sports Association in 1995 for her services and administration to sport. In 2006 she became a life member of Netball New Zealand.

=== Personal life ===
Wells is married to Sir John Wells, also a sports administrator. Their son Jeremy Wells is a television broadcaster.
