= Love & Disrespect =

Studio album by Elemeno P
- Released: 4 July 2003
- Genre: Punk rock, indie rock, pop punk, alternative rock
- Length: 35:53 (Original Release); 59:30 (Special Edition)
- Label: Universal
- Producer: Sam Gibson

Elemeno P chronology
Love & Disrespect (2003)	Trouble in Paradise (2005)

Love & Disrespect is the debut album of New Zealand band, Elemeno P. It was released 4 July 2003 through Universal Records. Love & Disrespect debuted at #1 on the New Zealand Album charts.

The first single "Fast Times in Tahoe", peaked at #32 in the New Zealand Singles chart, and "Urban Getaway" reached #27.

"On My Balcony" is also known as "Fight For You".

Every Day's a Saturday was released as a single in 2002. It has been used in both KFC and Coca-Cola New Zealand TV ads.

== Track listing ==
=== Original release ===
No.	Title	Length
1.	"Nirvana"	2:29
2.	"Verona"	2:47
3.	"Goodbye"	2:33
4.	"Urban Getaway"	2:11
5.	"The Benjamins"	3:01
6.	"Fast Times In Tahoe"	3:10
7.	"Claim To Fame"	3:22
8.	"I Don't Know"	3:16
9.	"Hold On"	2:02
10.	"On My Balcony"	3:25
11.	"Every Day's A Saturday"	2:51
12.	"Weed Out"	4:46
Total length:		35:53

Special Edition
No.	Title	Length
1.	"Christmas"	2:32
2.	"Sister"	2:59
3.	"Country Tahoe"	2:01
4.	"Big Band Nirvana"	3:00
5.	"Some Other Summertime"	2:33
6.	"Electro Saturday"	4:03
7.	"Boxcar" (Jawbreaker cover)	2:29
8.	"Hip Hop Verona"	4:00
Total length:		59:30

== Charts ==
=== Weekly charts ===
Chart (2003)	Peak position
New Zealand Albums (RMNZ)	1

=== Year-end charts ===
Chart (2003)	Position
New Zealand Albums (RMNZ)	14
Chart (2004)	Position
New Zealand Albums (RMNZ)	37

== Certifications ==
Certifications for Love & Disrespect
Region	Certification	Certified units/sales
New Zealand (RMNZ)	2× Platinum	30,000^{^}
^{^} Shipments figures based on certification alone.
