= Jo McCaw =

New Zealand netball player

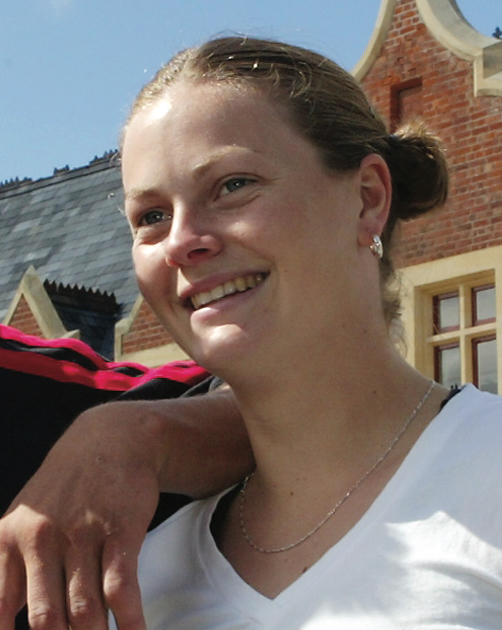
- McCaw in 2003

Personal information
- Born: 28 May 1983 (age 43) Oamaru, New Zealand
- Height: 1.79 m (5 ft 10 in)
- Relative: Richie McCaw (brother)

Netball career
- Playing positions: WD, C
Years	Club team	Apps
2008	Canterbury Tactix	
- Updated on 27 September 2010

Jo McCaw (born 28 June 1983 in Oamaru, New Zealand) is a New Zealand netball player. McCaw was a member of the Canterbury Flames in the National Bank Cup, and played for the Canterbury side again (under the new name of the Canterbury Tactix) in the inaugural season of the ANZ Championship. As of September 2010, McCaw continues to play with Canterbury in the National Provincial Championship. Her older brother Richie McCaw is captain of the Crusaders and New Zealand All Blacks rugby teams.
