= Deja Voodoo (New Zealand band) =

New Zealand rock band

- Origin: New Zealand
- Genres: Rock; Hard rock
- Years active: 2002–present
- Label: Liberation Music
- Members: Matt Heath; Chris Stapp; Piers Graham; Gerald Stuart
- Past members: Travis Mack; James Goodfellow; Phillip Bruff
- Website: http://www.backofthey.co.nz/

Deja Voodoo are a rock band from Auckland, New Zealand, where they formed in 2002.

== History ==
Deja Voodoo began as the fictional house band in the New Zealand television show Back Of The Y Masterpiece Television, which featured them in 15 seconds of mimed rock n' roll at the start of each episode. This led to a nationwide tour, which featured a finale where Heath smashed ten burning acoustic guitars over Chris Stapp's head. The tour was featured in the TV special Back of the Y Goes to Hollywood, with the band supplying the soundtrack.

On returning from the tour, drummer Phil 'Spanners Watson' Bruff left the band, to be replaced by Matt's girlfriend's little brother James. Five sold-out gigs around Auckland followed.

The band was put on hold when Chris and Matt sold their TV show to MTV. They went to the UK, but were back within six months. On their return to New Zealand they signed a four-figure record deal with Liberation Music and recorded their first studio album, Brown Sabbath.

Brown Sabbath was to be a beer-drinking concept album. Songs included "Beers", "Feelings", "We are Deja Voodoo", and "Today Tomorrow Timaru". Brown Sabbath was released in July 2004. Thousands of copies have been sold New Zealand wide, and the album has even made it to Australian record shelves.

In early 2006, a new single was released from their upcoming album Back in Brown entitled "Can't do". In typical Deja Voodoo tradition its main chorus line is "Can't do what I wanna do with you (you weren't even born in the '80s!!!)". Their second single from Back in Brown was "Shotgun", another typical tongue-in-cheek approach for the band featuring the main chorus line "I call shotgun on you". Back in Brown was released in July 2006.

== Band members ==
- Matt Heath (guitar, vocals)
- Chris Stapp (bass, vocals)
- Matthew Castles (drums)
- Gerald Stewart (lead guitar)

== Discography ==
Date of Release	Title	Label	Charted	Country	Catalog Number
Albums
2002	Haven't I heard this shit somewhere before?		-	-	
2004	Brown Sabbath	Liberation Music	24	NZ	LIBCD61312
2006	Back in Brown	Liberation Music	20	NZ	LIBCD82135
2009	The Shape of Grunge to Come...	Sub Grunge Records		NZ	RIPC001
EPs
2003	We Are Deja Voodoo		-	-	

=== Singles ===
Year	Single	Album	Charted	Certification
2004	"We Are Deja Voodoo"	Brown Sabbath	-	-
2004	"Beers"	Brown Sabbath	-	-
2004	"Today, Tomorrow, Timaru"	Brown Sabbath	-	-
2005	"P"	Brown Sabbath	-	-
2006	"Can't Do"	Back in Brown	-	-
2006	"Shotgun"	Back in Brown	-	-
2008	"Punisher"	The Shape of Grunge To Come	-	-
