= Brown Sabbath =

Studio album by Deja Voodoo
- Released: 2004
- Genre: Hard rock
- Length: 51:04
- Label: Liberation Music
- Producers: Brett Eccles and Matt Hiene

Deja Voodoo chronology
We Are Deja Voodoo (2003)	Brown Sabbath (2004)	Back in Brown (2006)

Brown Sabbath is the debut studio album by New Zealand band Deja Voodoo that was released in 2004. It is a "beer-themed" concept album.

== Track listing ==
1. "We Are Deja Voodoo"
2. "Beers"
3. "Today, Tomorrow, Timaru"
4. "Your Boyfriend Sucks"
5. "P"
6. "Jack the Ripper"
7. "One Horse Town"
8. "Feelings"
9. "Randy"
10. "250 ffm"
11. "More Beers"
