= Elemeno P (album) =

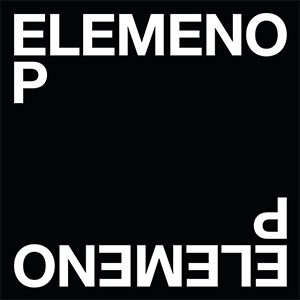

Studio album by Elemeno P
- Released: 26 May 2008
- Genre: Rock
- Label: Universal

Elemeno P chronology
Trouble in Paradise (2005)	Elemeno P (2008)

Singles from Elemeno P (album)
- 1. "Baby Come On" Released: 5 December 2007; 2. "Take The High Road" Released: 17 March 2008; 3. "Better Days" Released: 26 May 2008; 4. "Louder Louder" Released: September 2008

Elemeno P is the self-titled third studio album of New Zealand rock band Elemeno P. It was released on 26 May 2008. The band say that they "decided to make this record self titled as it really felt like it's the most honest and elemeno p-ish record to date."

A week before the release date, Elemeno P decided to put a song from their album on their Myspace each day (Monday 19 May - Sunday 25 May) for fans to listen to, so that by the time the album was Released the following Monday, Elemeno P fans would have listened to the whole album. Fan reaction from the first few songs was very good.

"Better Days" is the third single from the album and will be released late May - early June. The video was filmed at the Lawn Bowls Club in Grey Lynn, and Dave uploaded backstage pictures of the video shoot. The album was designed by London-based art-director and long-time friend of Dave and Justyn, Samuel Muir.

== Track listing ==
1. "Beverly Laurel (3:03)"
2. "Baby Come On (3:14)"
3. "Take the High Road (3:38)"
4. "Loaded Gun (3:52)"
5. "Pay For It (3:49)"
6. "Better Days (3:41)"
7. "Anna Don't Let Go (4:40)"
8. "Takes A Radical (3:08)"
9. "Louder Louder (2:59)"
10. "Some Things (4:31)"
11. "Yesterday" (bonus track)

== Review ==
Scene Newspaper, Todd Wilson, Matamata, NZ

4/5 Back with their 3rd album New Zealand’s own Elemeno P have definitely matured and have developed their music style since their previous two albums. The album was self-produced by the band, which was ideal as it best reflects where the band is currently at in their career by allowing them to portray their new-found depth. The album features a handful of tracks that will have your feet tapping along throughout the album. Some highlights from the album are ‘Louder Louder’, a kind-of bubbly, folk song that brings an uplifting atmosphere to the album and ‘Better Days’ which gradually builds momentum creating a great anthem for the album and a fitting third single. This is definitely their best album to date and is a must get if you are a proud supporter of New Zealand music.
