= Back of the Y Masterpiece Television =

New Zealand Television Series

- Also known as: Back of the Y Back of the Y TV
- Genre: Comedy; Action
- Created by: Matt Heath; Chris Stapp
- Written by: Chris Stapp; Matt Heath
- Directed by: Chris Stapp
- Starring: Matt Heath; Chris Stapp; Phil Bruff; Grubby; Chris Winn; Matt Perkins; Piers Graham; Melissa Goodfellow; Emma Savonije
- Composer: Deja Voodoo
- Country of origin: New Zealand
- Original language: English
- No. of series: 3

Production
- Executive producer: David Rose
- Producer: Mat Heath
- Editors: Chris Stapp; Matt Heath
- Running time: 30 minutes
- Production companies: Boty Prod; Great Southern Television

Original release
- Network: Triangle TV; TV2 (2001); C4 (2008–09)
- Release: 4 September 2001 – 7 July 2008

Back of the Y (also known as Back of the Y TV during series 1 and Back of the Y Masterpiece Television during series 2) is a New Zealand television series, created by Chris Stapp and Matt Heath. The show glorified Jackass-style stunts, the consumption of copious amounts of alcohol, casual violence and scatalogical or toilet humour. It took its name from being filmed in a building located close to the local YMCA, not from the Season 2 Hollywood special episode (which featured Randy Campbell jumping off the "Y" of the famous Hollywood Sign) as the show was already named prior to that episode.

== Cast ==
- Matt Heath as Danny Parker / Dick Johansonson
- Chris Stapp as Randy Cambell
- Phil Bruff as Spanners Watson
- Grubby as Prof. "Crash" Endicott
- Chris Winn as Wally Symons
- Matt Perkins as Skip Butler
- Piers Graham as Ray Smoodiver
- Melissa Goodfellow as Cindy Cockburn
- Emma Savonije as Communications Officer

== Concept and history ==
Back of the Y is centred on a mock live TV show, featuring segments such as "Randy Campbell's Extreme Stunts" and "Cunstables". The show was low budget, and apparently filmed with amateur equipment and edited on home computers. A description of the show at the start of the first episode established the premise for the show, with reference to one of the characters: "Phil Bruff had a dream. To make a New Zealand TV show that wasn't complete shit. He failed... Miserably!!!"

The second series consisted of seven episodes of Back of the Y Masterpiece Television and The Back of the Y Goes to Hollywood Special (2002).

In addition to New Zealand, the show was broadcast on MTV2 in the UK and on Channel V in Australia.

Back of the Y features the New Zealand band Deja Voodoo, originally a fictional house band. After Back of the Y Stapp and Heath developed Deja Voodoo into a real band.

In 2007, Stapp and Heath released The Devil Dared Me To (The Randy Campbell Story), backed by Headstrong Productions, in association with the New Zealand Film Commission. The film tells the story of Randy Campbell, Back of the Y's Stuntman character, and how he rose to become "the world's greatest stuntman". The film stars Chris Stapp as the titular Randy Campbell, and Matt Heath as Dick Johansonson as well as an all-New Zealand cast.

Back of the Y began shooting a third series from 24 September 2007 to 28 September 2007 at Henderson Valley Studios in Auckland. The third series was aired on C4 in New Zealand from 26 May 2008 and is made up of six episodes plus a making-of special.

== Regular features ==
- "Vaseline Warriors": a Mad Max parody set in a post-apocalyptic future where all women have been destroyed, and men fight over ripped up pornographic magazines and vaseline.
- "Bottlestore Galactica": a Battlestar Galactica parody. Space pilots Steineken and Heinlager get drunk and fly around the galaxy. Most episodes centred on drinking copious amounts of alcohol and the viewer observing the effects.
- "Ass/Off": a parody of Face/Off
- "Poo Man and Wees": a scatological Batman and Robin parody. Poo Man and his sidekick Wees fight against distasteful characters such as Scatwoman and the Shitty Mummy. Episodes usually end with multiple characters ingesting faeces and/or urine.
- "The Fart Tycoon": a recurring skit about a flatulent millionaire, whose good-hearted attempts at philanthropy are thwarted by his gaseous outbursts.

== Episodes ==
=== Series 2 ===
No.	Title	Directed by	Written by	Original release date
1	"Episode 1"	Chris Stapp	Chris Stapp and Matt Heath	4 September 2001
2	"Bullying Special"	Chris Stapp	Chris Stapp and Matt Heath	11 September 2001
3	"Episode 3"	Chris Stapp	Chris Stapp and Matt Heath	18 September 2001
4	"Episode 4"	Chris Stapp	Chris Stapp and Matt Heath	25 September 2001
5	"Episode 5"	Chris Stapp	Chris Stapp and Matt Heath	2 October 2001
6	"Episode 6"	Chris Stapp	Unknown	9 October 2001
7	"Behind the Y"	Unknown	Unknown	16 October 2001

=== Special (2002) ===
No.	Title	Directed by	Written by	Original release date
8	"Back of the Y Goes to Hollywood Special"	Chris Stapp and Matt Heath	Chris Stapp and Matt Heath	3 December 2002

=== Special (2005) ===
No.	Title	Directed by	Written by	Original release date
9	"Twenty O Six Beyond the Y – Back of the New Year"	Chris Stapp and Matt Heath	Unknown	31 December 2005

=== Series 3 ===
No.	Title	Directed by	Written by	Original release date
1	"Technology"	Unknown	Unknown	26 May 2008
2	"Woman"	Unknown	Unknown	2 June 2008
3	"Society"	Unknown	Unknown	9 June 2008
4	"Religion"	Unknown	Unknown	16 June 2008
5	"TV"	Unknown	Unknown	23 June 2008
6	"Tolerance"	Unknown	Unknown	30 June 2008
7	"The Making of Special"	Unknown	Unknown	7 July 2008

== Releases ==
- Complete Artswholes - A video cassette no longer available to the general public, this video contains every single second of Artswhole to ever be aired on the television show Space, including an episode that was banned.
- Back of the Y 2002 Annual - a book containing jokes, stories, pictures and comics. Only 10 copies were made.
- Back of the Y Masterpiece Television Series One (VHS) - a video containing the six episodes that played on Channel 2 in 2001.
- Back of the Y: The Two DVDs - contains all seven episodes of series one, and a number of bonus features.
