= Elemeno P =

New Zealand rock band

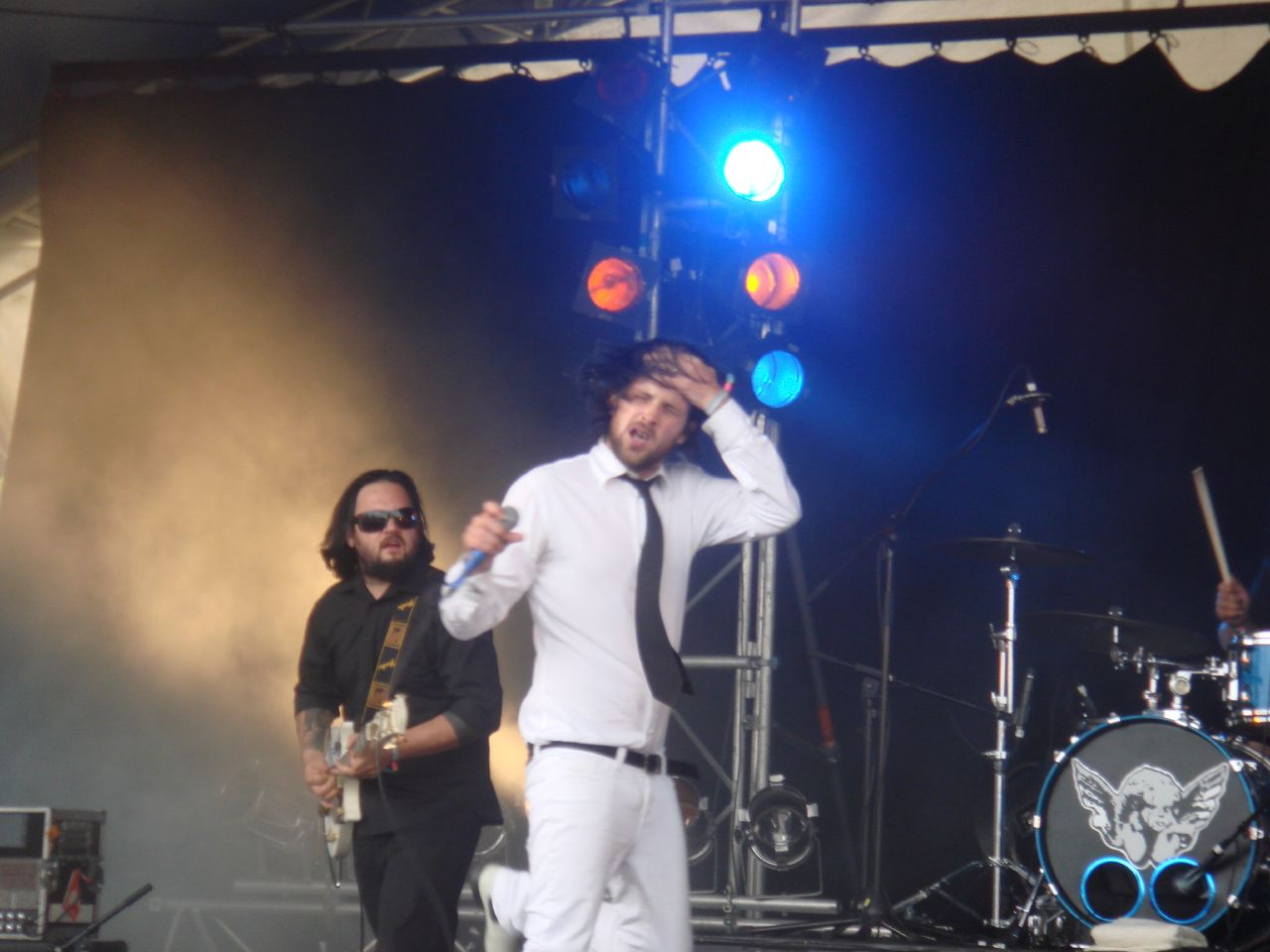
- Elemeno P at the 2007 Big Day Out

Background information
- Origin: New Zealand
- Genres: Rock, pop punk, pop rock
- Years active: 2003–2012, 2016– present
- Members: Scotty Pearson; Dave Gibson; Lani Purkis; Justyn Pilbrow

Elemeno P is a New Zealand rock band. The band's first album, Love & Disrespect was released on 4 July 2003, and reached number one on the RIANZ albums chart. Their second album, Trouble in Paradise was released on 24 November 2005 and includes the singles "11:57", "Burn", "One Left Standing", and "You Are". Their third album, Elemeno P was released on 26 May 2008.

Elemeno P has been referred to as New Zealand's biggest selling rock band and in 2006 won Best Group at the New Zealand Music Awards.

== Band members ==
Current

- Scotty Pearson – drums, backing vocals
- Dave Gibson – vocals, (baritone)
- Justyn Pilbrow – guitar, backing vocals
- Lani Purkis – bass, backing vocals

Live performance members

- Godfrey DeGrut – guitar, keyboard, saxophone, percussion
- Jessie Booth – guitar, keyboard, backing vocals

Former members

- Paul Gerring – bass, backing vocals (2001–2003)
- Dave Goodison – guitar, backing vocals (2009–2011)

During Elemeno P's set at the 2009 Big Day Out it was announced that founding member Justyn Pilbrow would be leaving the band to seek opportunities overseas. The guitarist standing in for the live shows is Dave Goodison, formerly of Garageland and the City Newton Bombers. Pilbrow returned to the band in late 2011.

In May 2009, Elemeno P announced they were writing new material for a new album (described by Pearson as a "story-so-far album"), a timeframe for release is yet to be confirmed.

December 2011 saw Elemeno P release a new song called Slow Down Boy which they allowed fans to download for free after sharing on Twitter or Facebook.

In an interview on The Edge radio station in January 2012, Dave Gibson has said that the band plan on releasing a greatest hits album with a couple of new tracks in March 2012, along with a tour.

In February 2021, Elemeno P released three compilations, under the names Just the B-Sides, Just the Hits, and Just the Misses, which labelled their previous songs under the three categories b-sides, "hits", and "misses".

== Tours ==
The band have toured with the Australian band End of Fashion. Elemeno P toured New Zealand to promote their album Trouble in Paradise in late 2005/early 2006. This was part of the Summer Burn Tour which included New Zealand bands Deja Voodoo, Steriogram and Shihad (Christchurch show only). The band has also toured with Goodnight Nurse, performing all age gigs around New Zealand. In the 2007/08 summer, Elemeno P toured New Zealand with The Feelers and Atlas.

Winter 2008 saw Elemeno P, Streetwise Scarlett and Deja Voodoo tour New Zealand playing all the main centres and many small towns.

Elemeno P teamed up with New Zealand music legends Supergroove in the summer of 2008/2009 for the Rock and Roll Caravan tour, playing all the summer hotspots such as the Coroglen Tavern, Riwaka Hotel, and (with Shihad and The Datsuns) the Lake Hawea Motor Inn.

In January 2011, they were a headliner for the annual Christian Parachute Music Festival. In March 2011, they played at the Jim Beam Homegrown festival.

Dave Gibson has said in an interview with The Edge radio station 7 January 2012 that the band was looking at a tour in March 2012 to promote their greatest hits album which is currently in the works.

In March 2017, the members of Elemeno P came together from their respective homes in the US and Auckland to play shows in Christchurch, Auckland, and at Wellington's Homegrown festival.

== Discography ==
=== Albums ===
Date of Release	Title	Label	Charted	Certification
2003	Love & Disrespect	Universal	1	3× Platinum
2005	Trouble in Paradise	Universal	2	Platinum
2008	Elemeno P	Universal	3	

=== Singles ===
Year	Title	Chart Positions	Album
Year	Title	New Zealand RIANZ Singles	Album
2002	"Fast Times in Tahoe"	32	Love & Disrespect
2002	"Nirvana"	—	Love & Disrespect
2002	"Every Day's a Saturday"	—	Love & Disrespect
2003	"Verona"	10	Love & Disrespect
2003	"Urban Getaway"	27	Love & Disrespect
2004	"Claim to Fame"	—	Love & Disrespect
2005	"Verona" (re-release)	—	Love & Disrespect
2005	"11:57"	10	Trouble in Paradise
2005	"Burn"	36	Trouble in Paradise
2006	"You Are"	35	Trouble in Paradise: Special Edition
2006	"One Left Standing"	—	Trouble in Paradise
2006	"S.O.S"	—	Trouble in Paradise
2007	"Baby Come On"	13	Elemeno P
2008	"Take The High Road"	—	Elemeno P
2008	"Better Days"	—	Elemeno P
2008	"Louder Louder"	—	Elemeno P

=== Compilations ===
Date of Release	Title	Label
2021	Just the B-Sides	Universal
2021	Just the Hits	Universal
2021	Just the Misses	Universal
