= The Unauthorised History of New Zealand =

New Zealand comedic history television series

- Created by: Jeremy Wells; Philip Smith; Paul Casserly
- Written by: Lee Baker; Paul Casserly; Jeremy Wells; Steve Braunias; Graeme Hill
- Directed by: Paul Casserly
- Presented by: Jeremy Wells
- Theme music composer: Bernie Allen
- Country of origin: New Zealand
- Original language: English
- No. of series: 4
- No. of episodes: 28

Production
- Executive producer: Philip Smith
- Producers: Claire Logan; Paul Casserly
- Editors: Jonathan Brough; Fabiana Hornos; Gary Hunt
- Production companies: Great Southern Television; TVNZ Production

Original release
- Network: TV One
- Release: 20 September 2005 – 14 September 2008

The Unauthorised History of New Zealand is a New Zealand comedic history talk show series that tells the "real truth" behind the history of New Zealand.

== Synopsis ==
Some of the archive footage seen on the show has never been seen on television before because it was deemed too shocking by TV executives to screen at the time. Some material created for the programme, including the 1920s-style animated series Happy Hori, is presented as though it were archival.

The series does not tackle history chronologically; instead, each episode explores a topic.

The nation was shaped by visitors, and the first episode examines the impact of such diverse guests as sheep, Colonel Sanders, the Shah of Iran and Muhammad Ali on New Zealand. Famous troublemakers such as Hongi Hika, the Ingham twins and the Neil Roberts' (the suicide bomber and the TV producer) feature in an episode devoted to Trouble.

Other episodes in the series consider some of the country's most powerful people, its legends, and reveal some of the most shocking and sexiest moments in the nation's history.

== Episodes ==
=== Series 1 (2005) ===
No. overall	No. in series	Title	Original release date
1	1	"Visitors"	20 September 2005
2	2	"Sex"	27 September 2005
3	3	"Trouble"	4 October 2005
4	4	"Escape"	10 October 2005
5	5	"Power"	18 October 2005
6	6	"Belief"	25 October 2005
7	7	"Shock"	12 November 2005

=== Series 2 (2007) ===
No. overall	No. in series	Title	Original release date
8	1	"Fame"	12 February 2007
9	2	"Leisure"	19 February 2007
10	3	"Evil"	5 March 2007
11	4	"Ingenuity"	12 March 2007
12	5	"Money"	19 March 2007
13	6	"Conflict"	26 March 2007
14	7	"Folly"	2 April 2007

=== Series 3 (2008) ===
No. overall	No. in series	Title	Original release date
15	1	"Spirituality"	6 January 2008
16	2	"Future"	13 January 2008
17	3	"Crime"	20 January 2008
18	4	"Greed"	27 January 2008
19	5	"Beauty"	22 June 2008
20	6	"Fear"	29 June 2008
21	7	"Tribes"	6 July 2008

=== Series 4 (2008) ===
No. overall	No. in series	Title	Original release date
22	1	"Politics"	13 July 2008
23	2	"Leaders"	20 July 2008
24	3	"Elections"	27 July 2008
25	4	"Issues"	3 August 2008
26	5	"Entertainment"	31 August 2008
27	6	"Delinquents"	7 September 2008
28	7	"Aroha"	14 September 2008

== Crew ==
- Lee Baker (director)
- Jonathan Brough (Director 'Dr Rangi' & various segments)
