= Rock music in New Zealand =

- Other names: New Zealand rock music Kiwi rock music
- Stylistic origins: Rock music Rock and roll music
- Cultural origins: 1955 and the 1960s in New Zealand

Rock music in New Zealand, also known as Kiwi rock music and New Zealand rock music, rose to prominence first in 1955 with Johnny Cooper's cover version of Bill Haley's hit song "Rock Around the Clock". This was followed by Johnny Devlin, sometimes nicknamed New Zealand's Elvis Presley, and his cover of "Lawdy Miss Clawdy". The 1960s saw Max Merritt and the Meteors and Ray Columbus & the Invaders achieve success. In the 1970s and early 1980s the innovative Split Enz had success internationally as well as nationally, with member Neil Finn later continuing with Crowded House. Other influential bands in the 1970s were Th' Dudes, Dragon and Hello Sailor. The early 1980s saw the development of the indie rock "Dunedin sound", typified by Dunedin bands such as The Clean, Straitjacket Fits, and The Chills, recorded by the Flying Nun record label of Christchurch.

== 1950s ==
Rock music began in New Zealand in 1955 when Wellington-based country singer Johnny Cooper (popularly known as the "Maori cowboy") recorded a cover version of American Bill Haley’s hit song "Rock Around the Clock" for HMV, the first rock and roll record recorded outside the United States. In 1956, Cooper wrote and recorded an original song called "Pie Cart Rock and Roll". The song referred to a pie cart that he visited while managing talent shows in Whanganui. The song is believed to be New Zealand's first indigenous rock and roll recording, although "Resuscitation rock", written by Wellington teenager Sandy Tansley in March 1957, may have been released a few weeks earlier than Cooper's song. Singer Johnny Devlin was touted as New Zealand's Elvis Presley and his cover of "Lawdy Miss Clawdy" remains one of New Zealand's biggest-selling singles, having sold 100,000 copies in 1959–60. In 1959, Mabel Howard, Minister of Social Welfare, went to see Johnny Devlin perform at the Christchurch Town Hall, declaring at half-time, "There’s nothing much wrong with rock and roll". New Zealand's studios lagged behind their counterparts in the Northern Hemisphere and 1950s recording stars The Tumbleweeds recorded six of their hit albums in the living room of one of their band members.

== 1960s ==
New Zealand radio's conservative programming approach was increasingly challenged by young people in the 1960s. Radio Hauraki initially began life as a pirate radio station, broadcasting in international waters 50 miles (80 kilometres) offshore from Auckland in the Hauraki Gulf, a deliberate move that allowed them to circumnavigate restrictive broadcasting legislation and broadcast their own playlist. This in part spearheaded the way for the gradual deregulation of the radio industry. Towards the end of the 1960s radio stations like Radio Hauraki and, later, Radio I, were playing exclusively rock and pop music to a teenage and young adult audience.

The 1960s also witnessed a dramatic rise in locally written and recorded popular music. However, many pop bands and performers of the time also released their own versions, or "covers" of hits by overseas artists. It was an era when vinyl reigned supreme and teenagers queued outside local music and record shops to buy the latest hit singles. The Fourmyula's "Nature", written by Wayne Mason in 1969, still retains considerable popularity and was voted the top New Zealand song of the last 75 years in 2001.

In Christchurch, Max Merritt and the Meteors played regularly at The Teenage Club and achieved iconic status in New Zealand with their songs "Get a Haircut" and "C’mon Let’s Go". Ray Columbus & the Invaders were influenced by the early 1960s work of Cliff Richard and the Beatles. Columbus styled his band on the mod look and they were noted for their Fender equipment and vivid blue suits. After the Beatles toured New Zealand in 1964 Ray Columbus & the Invaders had a number one hit in Australia and New Zealand in 1964 with their cover version of "She's a Mod", a song by The Senators.

== 1970s ==
In contrast to the 1960s, relatively few New Zealand groups released records. In 1976, six million records were sold, with only seven singles and four albums from local performers reaching the Top 50. The following year eight singles and three albums charted, but overall record sales dropped to five and a half million.

Some of the more influential rock bands in the 1970s were Th' Dudes (whose guitarist Dave Dobbyn formed DD Smash in the 1980s), Dragon, Hello Sailor and Split Enz, fronted by Tim Finn, and later, his brother Neil Finn who went on to form Crowded House.

The first punk rock bands – including the Suburban Reptiles and the Scavengers – formed in Auckland in the late 1970s and were soon followed by groups in Christchurch, Wellington and Dunedin. With guitarist Alec Bathgate, Knox formed the Tall Dwarfs and, with a rudimentary four-track TEAC tape deck, he began recording various post-punk bands that had cropped up in Dunedin, starting with the Clean. AK79, a compilation album featuring Auckland punk bands, was issued in late 1979.

The Redwood 70 music festival, held six months after Woodstock in 1970, was cautiously sub-titled New Zealand's first national music convention. Held at Redwood Park in Swanson in Auckland's far west, the festival was organised by Auckland promoter Phil Warren. Redwood 70's headline act was a newly solo Robin Gibb, backed by a string quartet. The New Zealand groups who made up the bulk of the two-day festival's entertainment were less mainstream than Gibb and played rock music. Though over 9000 fans attended, the festival lost money, a pattern that has continued in New Zealand in regard to multi-day outdoor festivals in this country. There were smaller festivals in 1971 – the Englefield Rock Festival at Belfast near Christchurch, another at Waikanae over Easter weekend, and the University Arts Council's Jam Factory in July.

The Great Ngaruawahia Music Festival of early January 1973, was organised by music promoters Robert Raymond and Barry Coburn. They followed the Woodstock template closely, including plans for a live album and film, which is how the New York State festival turned a profit. They chose a rural site with good access to large population centres, arranged trains from Auckland and Wellington, and selected international headline rock acts including Black Sabbath and Sandy Denny. They drew heavily on the still vibrant counterculture for New Zealand performers like Blerta, Mammal, Billy TK and Powerhouse. Only 18,000 fans paid the $8 to attend; 25,000 were needed to make a profit. Problems with inadequate space and toilets added further costs. Neither a film nor a live album eventuated (although some live recordings were made). Even so, music historian John Dix considered the event a success: it was a key event in New Zealand rock history, which introduced the acts that would dominate the local music scene in the mid-1970s.

The 1979 Nambassa Festival, held on a 400-acre farm on Landlyst Rd in Golden Valley, just north of Waihi, drew over 65,000 fans and was a key event for New Zealand's hippie generation. Nambassa was named after the Big Nambas tribal group from northwest Malekula, Vanuatu. Organiser Peter Terry was inspired by the group's traditional lifestyle, self-sufficiency, and lack of exposure to Western commercialism. The headline act was Little River Band. Media reaction to Nambassa was mostly positive. The Auckland Star ran extensive coverage, and the Dominion devoted its front page to the event. Peter Terry used the Woodstock model to successfully spin off a feature film and a book from the event, for which a profit of $200,000 was eventually declared.

== 1980s ==
The 1980s saw the emergence of independent labels like Propeller Records in Auckland and the Flying Nun record label in Christchurch who were highly influential in the development of modern indie rock. Early 1980s Dunedin groups like The Clean, Straitjacket Fits, and The Chills, recorded by Flying Nun, typified what became known as the ‘Dunedin sound’ – droning vocals, jangly guitars, simple drumbeats and keyboards, and saw some success internationally, particularly on American and European college radio. The Chills were an inspiration for Californian bands like Jay Reatard, Ty Segall, and Wavves.

Split Enz, Th’ Dudes, Dragon, and Hello Sailor continued to gain chart success in New Zealand and other parts of the world. Ex-members of Split Enz then went on to form Crowded House, one of New Zealand's most successful bands. Phil Judd, another ex-Split Enz member, formed The Swingers who released "Counting the Beat" in 1981.

By the late nineteen-eighties, the New Zealand punk generation was ageing; anti-socialist reaction had curbed the generosity of the dole, which in turn reduced the free time New Zealand musicians had directed towards writing and performing.

== 1990s ==
Formed in 1988, hard rock band Shihad released several albums in the 1990s with great success in New Zealand. Also successful locally in the 1990s were bands The Feelers, Zed, Head Like A Hole, and Dead Flowers Auckland singer/songwriter Darcy Clay was critically lauded in 1997 for his Number 5 hit "Jesus I Was Evil".The skate punk scene also brought out bands like Muckhole, Brubeck and Kitch who often supported overseas acts like Pennywise and played at the Van's Warped Tour in New Zealand. Blindspott formed in West Auckland in 1997, was one of the pioneers in the nu metal genre and has recently reunited with live performances.

== 2000s ==
In the 2000s, New Zealand indie bands continued to be successful, with bands like The Naked and Famous, Die! Die! Die! and The Mint Chicks releasing successful recordings. The members of The Mint Chicks went on to form Unknown Mortal Orchestra and Opossum. Indie band The Phoenix Foundation and artist Liam Finn, the son of Neil Finn, found success in New Zealand.

Garage Rock revival bands such as The Datsuns and The D4 became very active at this time, playing many shows in NZ and abroad. The Datsuns' self-titled album came out in 2002 to much fanfare after the band appeared on John Peel’s BBC1 Radio Show.

The rock band Elemeno P also had success between 2002 and 2008 with three well-received albums. Elemeno P has been referred to as New Zealand's biggest selling rock band.

The pop/rock group consisting of three brothers from NZ, Evermore, found success based out of Sydney with their debut album Dreams in 2004.

Singer-songwriter Gin Wigmore (folk/blues rock) won the US-based International Songwriting Competition in 2004, launching a successful national and international career. Each of her albums has reached number 1 in New Zealand, and her songs have regularly been synched for advertising.

City of Souls was formed in August 2015 by guitarists Trajan Schwencke and Steve Boag, soon joined by vocalist Richie Simpson. City of Souls went on to win the Aotearoa Music Awards for best rock album Synaesthesia in 2020.

Formed in 2010, Alien Weaponry rose to be New Zealand's most successful rock act following the release of their debut album Tū in 2018. This led to European and American tours with shows at some of the world's biggest heavy metal festivals.

== See also ==
- Psychedelic rock in Australia and New Zealand
