= Keil =

Keil is a surname, and may refer to:

- Alfredo Keil (1850–1907), Portuguese romantic composer and painter
- Alphonso Keil (1944–2008) Samoan-born rock & roll musician, founding member of The Zodiacs and The Kavaliers
- Birgit Keil (born 1944), German prima ballerina
- Carl Friedrich Keil (1807–1888), German Biblical scholar
- Eliza Keil, Samoan-born singer and member of Keil Isles
- Ernst Keil, (1816–1878), German publisher and founder of Die Gartenlaube
- Herma Keil, Samoan-born rock & roll singer of the 1960s and lead singer of the Keil Isles
- Francisco Keil do Amaral (1910–1975), Portuguese architect, composer, painter, and photographer
- Franz von Keil (1862–1945), Austrian naval officer
- Freddie Keil (19??–1994), Samoan-born rock & roll singer and lead singer of the Keil Isles
- Heinrich Keil (1822–1894), German classical philologist
- Johann Friedrich Karl Keil (1807–1888), German Bible commentator
- Josef Keil (1878–1963), Austrian historian, epigrapher, and archaeologist
- Klaus Keil (1934–2022), American astronomer and father of Mark
- Lillian Kinkella Keil (1916–2005), American flight nurse
- Mark Keil (born 1967), American tennis player and son of Klaus
- Olaf Keil (born 1934), Samoan-born guitarist, founder of the Keil Isles and custom guitar builder
- Peter Keil (born 1942), German painter
- Susanne Keil (born 1978), German hammer thrower
- William Keil (1812–1877), American founder of communal religious societies

== See also ==
- Keil (company), technology company
- Keil School, Dumbarton, Scotland
- Keils, Jura, Argyll and Bute, Scotland
- Kiel, Schleswig-Holstein, Germany
