= Zodiac Records (New Zealand) =

- Parent company: Stebbing Recording
- Founded: 1950
- Founder: Eldred Stebbing; Phil Stebbing
- Genre: Various
- Country of origin: New Zealand
- Location: Auckland
- Official website: www.stebbing.co.nz

Zodiac Records was a New Zealand based label founded in 1950. It was originally owned by Stebbing Recording and Sound, Ltd.(until 1965) then Zodiac Records Ltd., headquartered in Auckland; the company also released both 78s and 45s. Artists that released their records on that label included Howard Morrison, Herma Keil The Keil Isles, Ray Columbus and The Invaders, Allison Durbin, Sandy Edmonds, The Pleazers, The Gremlins. It also had a distributed label, Viscount Records, owned by Gary Daverne, Eldred's cousin.

== History ==
Zodiac was founded by Eldred Stebbing and his brother Phil Stebbing. Stebbing and his brother were partners until 1952. They had a falling out and Phil left. After a five-year break, Eldred restarted the label. His wife Margaret came on board, and from the late 1960s on, his sons Robert and Vaughan. The brothers now own the company (now called Stebbing Recording Centre Ltd.)

Besides having many famous and hit making New Zealand acts on its releases, Zodiac Records were the first New Zealand record label to have a number one hit outside of New Zealand.

Eldred Stebbing, the label's founder died on 6 December 2009.

== Selected releases ==
- Z-1002 - Hager Sisters - Manu Rere / Bill wolfgramm's Hawaiians - Ai Ai Malie (78 RPM0
- Z-1003 - Hagar Sisters - Maui Girl / Maui Chimes - (1957) (78 rpm)
- Z-1004 - Daphne Walker & Bill Wolfgramm's Hawaiians - Polynesian Love Song / Hawaiian War Chant - (1957) (78 rpm)
- Z-1005 - Benny's Five With Morgan Clarke - Haka Boogie / Hawaiian Boogie - (1958) (45 rpm & 78 rpm)
- Z-1006 - Morgan Clarke And The Zodiac Paradise Islanders - Dusky Polynesian / Ninety-Nine Ways - (1957) (78 rpm)
- Z-1007 - Johnny Granger With The Rock A Billys - I'm Stickin' with You / Empty Arms - (1957) (45 rpm & 78 rpm)
- Z-1008 - Morgan Clarke & Bill Sevesi & His Novelty Five- Christmas Time / Go Man Go - (1957) (First 45 rpm only release)
- Z-1009 - The Howard Morrison Quartet - There's Only One Of You / Big Man - (1958) (First single for Howard Morrison Quartet)
- Z-1010 - The Howard Morrison Quartet - Haere Ra E Hine / Marama Pai - (1958) (Rumoured to have a 78 rpm release)
- Z-1011 - Bob Paris And The Auckland Jive Centre Band - Rebel Rouser / Rumble (1959)
- Z-1011 - The Howard Morrison Quartet - Deep Purple / Marie (1958) (78 rpm Only)
- Z-1012 - The Howard Morrison Quartet - Po Kare Kare Ana / Hoki Mai - (1959)
- Z-1013 - The Howard Morrison Quartet Featuring Jerry Merito - Goodbye Baby / Short Fat Fanny - (1959)
- Z-1014 - Eddie Howell With The Bob Paris Combo - Kansas City / Bob Paris Combo - Big Girl - (1959)
- Z-1015 - Red Hewitt And The Buccaneers - The Girl With In Teddy Bear Coat / Betty Lou's Got A New Pair Of Shoes - (1959)
- Z-1016 The Beatnicks - Juvenile Delinquent / Dirty Feet - (1959)
- Z-1017 Eddie Howell With The Bob Paris Combo - Summertime / I Need Your Love Tonight - (1959)
- Z-1018 - ?
- Z-1019 Eddie Howell - Primrose Lane / Just A Closer Walk With Thee - (1959)
- Z-1020 Bob Paris And The Peppermints - Time Bomb / Theme From Peter Gunn (1959)
- Z-1021 Eddie Howell - Sitting In The Back Seat / I'm In The Mood For Love (1959)
- Z-1022 Herma Keil And The Keil Isles - Don't You Know / Blue Guitar - (1959)

== 1960s ==
=== 1960 ===
- Z-1024 The Howard Morrison Quartet -" Hawaiian Cowboy Song" / "Little Darlin'" - (1960)
- Z-1025 - Owen Griffiths And Clive Weir & The Rockettes - "Out Of The Blue Gums"/ "Waltzing Matilda" - (1960)
- Z-1026 - Apaapa Sisters With The Down Town Boys - "Mail Man", "Bring Me No More Blues" / "Guess Things Happen That Way" - (1960)
- Z-1027 - Jan Linden with the Jock Nisbet group and Ann Holmes - Among My Souvenirs / Blue Skies (1960)
- Z-1028 - Eddie Howell (featuring the Jock Nisbet Group) "Teenage Baby" /(With The Choir Of The Auckland Choral Society. Conductor, Ray Wilson; Harp, Dorothea Franchi; Accordion, Silvio De Pra And Bass, Bob Ofsosk) "When Its Springtime In The Rockies" - (1960)
- Z-1029 - Red Hewitt And Buccaneers - "Midnight Special" / "Beatnik Fly" - (1960)
- Z-1030 - Herma Keil And The Keil Isles - "Be My Guest" / "Do You Miss Me" - (1960)
- Z-1031 - Red Hewitt And Buccaneers - "Boston Blues Blues" / "Stay Away From Me" - (1960)
- Z-1032 - Luke Dalton - "Outside My Window" / "Wedding Bliss" - (1960)
- Z-1033 - Eddie Howell And The Buccaneers - "Lonely Blue Boy" / "By The Light Of The Silvery Moon" - (1960)
- Z-1034 - Glyn Tucker With Ian Lowe & The Tornadoes - "I'm In Love" / "Carol" (1960)
- Z-1035 - Herma Keil And The Keil Isles - "Boogie Boy" / "Shakey" - (1960)
- Z-1036 - Eddie Howell - "Little Baby Girl" / "If I Had A Girl" - (1960)
- Z-1037 - Herma Keil And The Keil Isles - "Country Boy" / "Poor Man's Riches" - (1960)
- Z-1038 - The Howard Morrison Quartet - "Because Of You" / "Hoki Mai" - (1961)
- Z-1039 - Eddie Howell With Ben Tawhiti And The Matonaires - "Hippy Hippy Shake" / "Stuck on You" - (1960)
- Z-1040 - Herma Keil And The Keil Isles - "Made To Be Loved" / "Come And Get Me" - (1960)
- Z-1041 - Charlie Couch & Toko Sisters & Jack Nisbett Group - "Starlight Starbright" / "If I Had A Way" -(1960)
- Z-1042 - Danny Robinson & The Toko Sisters - King Tawhiao / Pamai - (1960)
- Z-1043 - The Three Lads - "Seabird" / "Drunken Sailor" - (1960)
- Z-1044 - The Voices of Eddie Howell with Ben Tawhiti & The Matonaires - "Cathy's Clown" / "Well Don't You Know It Well" - (1960)
- Z-1045 - Zodiac Paradise Islanders - Hawaiian Boogie / You And I On Our Lanai - (1960)
- Z-1046 - Owen Griffiths & The Rockettes - "Swingin' School" / "Angela Jones" - (1960)
- Z-1047 - Peter Posa - "Sweet Georgia Brown" / "Some Of These Days" - (1960)
- Z-1048 - Bill Morton - "The Hanging Tree" / "Riders In The Sky" - (1960)
- Z-1049 - Esme Stephens And The Silhouettes With The Peter Posa Combo - "Sixteen Reasons" / "Paper Roses" - (1960)
- Z-1050 - Red Hewitt And Buccaneers - "Down Yonder" / "Goofus" - (1960)
- Z-1051 - The Silhouettes - "My Tani" / "Alley Oop" - (1960)
- Z-1052 - Apaapa Sisters With The Down Town Boys - "Train Of Love" / "Sentimental Kid" - (1960)
- Z-1053 - Eddie Howell With The Silhouettes, With Ben Tawhiti And The Matonaires - "Tell Laura I Love Her" / Trouble In Paradise (1960)
- Z-1054 - Herma Keil And The Keil Isles - "Don't Come Knockin'" / "My Heart Crys For Me" - (1960)
- Z-1055 - Daphne Walker - "Via Con Dios" / "Broken Wings" - (1960)
- Z-1056 - Charlie Couch & The Silhouettes & The Peter Posa Combo - "Looking For A Star / The Shrine On The Second Floor" - (1960)
- Z-1057 - Red Hewitt And The Buccaneers - Dreamin' / It Is A Bluebird - (1960)
- Z-1058 - Apaapa Sisters - "E Waka" / "E Tehia" - (1960)
- Z-1059 Rod Derret - "Teddy Boy's Picnic" / "The Jester" - (1960)
- Z-1060 Happy Hill - "The Full Pack Of Cards" / "Pine Trees To Toothpicks" - (1960)
- Z-1061 Peter Posa - "Josephine" / "Steel Guitar Rag" - (1960)
- Z-1065 Claude Papesch - "In Apple Blossom Time" / "Danny Boy"
- Z-1082 Freddie Keil And The Kaveliers The Twist / Tossin' And Turnin'
- Z-1164 Ray Columbus and The Invaders - "She's a Mod" / "Poison Ivy"

== CD ==
- Various Artists - Zodiac Records Sampler 1964 - 1972 - ANCD034
- Ray Columbus & The Invaders - The Definitive Collection - Zodiac ZCD4009 - 2009
- The Howard Morrison Quartet - This Was The Howard Morrison Quartet
- Deryn Trainer - Deryn Trainer
- Evan Silva - Out Of The Shadows
