= Waves (band) =

New Zealand folk rock band

- Origin: Auckland, New Zealand
- Genre: Folk rock
- Years active: 1974–1977, 2013–present
- Label: Direction Records
- Members: Graeme Gash; David Marshall; Kevin Wildman; Michael Mason
- Past members: Michael Matthew; Rex Carter

Waves was a New Zealand folk rock band that recorded a top-selling self-titled album in 1975 before disbanding in 1977. Its lineup emerged from an acoustic trio, Rosewood, which originally included Geoff Chunn, who later joined Split Enz. Despite making only sporadic live appearances—one of which was a double billing shared with Split Enz—their singles gained major airplay on Auckland radio and the Waves album reached No.7 on the New Zealand album charts, later becoming a sought-after collector's item.

In 1976 the band recorded a second album that was rejected by their record company, which later erased the tapes. Dejected, the band split up in September 1977. A surviving rough mix of the second album was released in 2013 as Misfit, a bonus disc with the first official CD release of Waves.

A co-founder of the band, Graeme Gash, released a solo album, After the Carnival, in 1981.

Waves reformed in 2013 for a record store performance in Auckland and announced they were writing songs for a further album.

== History ==
In the early 1970s Auckland Technical Institute art and design students Graeme Gash and Kevin Wildman formed Rosewood, an acoustic folk-pop trio, with Geoff Chunn, gigging regularly at an Auckland venue and also at the 1973 Ngaruawahia Music Festival. Rosewood disbanded when Chunn left in April 1973 to join Split Enz as drummer.

Gash and Wildman continued to meet to play guitar and work on their vocal harmonies, mixing with other Auckland musicians at the Parnell Rd home of Geoff and Mike Chunn. Gash recalled: "One day David Marshall crashed our jam; we were gobsmacked. He was great. We snapped him up. Michael Matthew was hanging out with a bunch of musos we knew, and we cajoled him into accompanying us on the bashwalk to glory."

Adopting the name Waves, the band—with Gash, Wildman and Marshall on guitar and Matthew on bass—played at folk clubs, cafes and eventually at Auckland Town Hall, His Majesty's Theatre, the Maidment and the Mercury, playing soft rock and singing four-part harmonies. They avoided the pub circuit, as Gash explained: "They wanted something to drink to, not think to. So we needed venues where the intricacies of our music would be heard." The band had three writers, with each member excelling at singing or guitar-playing. Gash said the band felt proud playing original New Zealand songs. "Back then it wasn't particularly popular to front up and play all your own music. People tended to get a little bored with that."

With continued performances, the band sensed a building excitement and air of anticipation. "Split Enz had embedded themselves into the national psyche, or at least the leading edge of it," Gash said. "Hot Licks was championing a lot of local work. Radio stations like Hauraki were into doing their bit for the locals as well. Hauraki were great in those days; they used to do Buck-a-Head concerts. Big venue, one dollar for two bands."

== Waves album ==
In 1975 Roger Jarrett, the editor of local music magazine Hot Licks, introduced the band to Kerry Thomas and Guy Morris, co-owners of the magazine and Direction Records, a retail chain and independent record label. On 7 July 1975 the band began a five-day recording session for their debut album at Stebbing Studios in Jervois Rd, Ponsonby, across the road from the eight-bedroom colonial villa where Waves members lived. Gash recalled: "Before walking through the front door of Stebbings, we’d prepared, done a lot of practice and a lot of live work with the material, so we knew it back to front. Let’s face it, we’d been living across the road getting ourselves ready for this moment for about a year."

Thomas arranged expatriate New Zealand producer Peter Dawkins, then living in Sydney, to return to Auckland to produce the album. Gash said: "Dawkins had five days, and he marshalled us through the procedures in a most efficient fashion. That was his job, and he did it well. He was tough though: one of our friends wasn’t cutting it quickly enough with his solo, and Peter made me go into the studio and fire him on the spot. We freely availed ourselves of notable contributors. Some—Mike Chunn, Mike Caen, Roy Mason—were personal friends; others—Vic Williams, Murray Grindlay, Mike Harvey, Paul Lee—were introduced to us in the studio." He told The New Zealand Herald: "We were in a world we had dreamed of being in. It was a mix of excitement and terror."

At the end of the week, Dawkins flew back to Sydney with the finished tapes to mix them. "No doubt, in his world this was standard procedure," Gash said. "However what it did was disengage us from the process. When the mixes came back to Auckland, we didn’t understand them. They were not the way we heard ourselves. We voiced our desire to remix the album. Almost miraculously, Kerry Thomas agreed, and gained my gratitude forever. We kept Peter’s mixes of "Waterlady Song" and "Arrow"; the rest the band remixed at Stebbing's with (engineer) Phil Yule, and that is what appeared on the album."

The album was released in October 1975, reached No.7 on the album charts and became one of the best-selling albums by New Zealand artists of the 1970s. Three singles were released—"The Dolphin Song"/"Letters", "Arrow"/Clock House Shuffle" and "At the Beach"/Waitress".

== Follow-up and breakup ==
The success of Waves attracted the attention of major record labels and in 1976 the band—now with a drummer, Rex Carter, and new bassist Michael Mason, who replaced Michael Matthew—entered Mandrill Studios in Parnell to record their second album for WEA Records. Some of the songs followed the folk-rock style of the debut album, while on others the band began to explore a new direction with electric guitars.

Gash said: "We were producing it ourselves, and it was all ourselves; unlike the first album, there were no guest performances. The rhythm section was jelling nicely, the songs and the playing seemed a step up and we felt much more relaxed and in control of the process than we had previously. Things were looking pretty good." But with just a few solo overdubs to complete and on the verge of mixing, the band was told that label boss Tim Murdoch didn't like what they had done and had ordered that the multi-track tapes should be recorded over.

Studio boss Dave Hurley allowed the band to copy a rough mix of the tapes before it was wiped. "That is the only record we have of our endeavours, an entire album’s worth of work," Gash told NZ Musician magazine. "We had worked hard. It deserved better. Maybe we just weren’t tough enough; certainly, after a few good blows to the head you start to wonder what it’s all for. The second album being wiped just prior to the mix broke our hearts."

In July 1977 the band recorded one last song, "Vegas", at Mascot Studios and delivered it to Murdoch. "It was some of our best playing," Gash said. "Almost unbelievably, the plug was once again pulled just prior to mixing."

In 1981 Gash produced a solo album, After the Carnival, while Marshall became a member of Lip Service in 1980 and Martial Law in 1984.

== 2013 revival ==
The band reformed in 2003 for a one-off gig at the St James Theatre in a lineup that included Dave Dobbyn, Don McGlashan, Anika Moa, Liam Finn and Martin Phillipps. In 2012 the band was contacted by Roger Marbeck of Ode Records and music enthusiast and archivist Grant Gillanders to reissue the 1975 Waves album—by then a collector's item fetching high prices—on CD and vinyl for Record Store Day in April, with the release launched by a live performance at the Real Groovy record store in Auckland. Neither Marbeck nor Gillanders was aware a second album also existed, albeit in a rudimentary form and decided to re-release them both as a double CD. "I think it was the idea of getting that out of the shadows and into the light that swung the deal for me," Gash said.

As planning began, it was discovered the original master tapes for the Waves album had vanished with the collapse in the 1970s of Direction Records. "It came down to the small number of unplayed vinyls I had stashed away under the bed for the last 38 years," Gash said. "They were old, but mint, and I took them to Stebbings, where we ran them on a very high-end turntable and transferred it all to digital files. It worked superbly. We then mastered it there for vinyl with Steve McGough, pulling in the original engineer, Phil Yule, to listen as well. I then redid all the cover art and designed a new insert for photos and info, Kevin did a take on the original Direction label, and we sent it all off for cutting, pressing and packaging to United Record Pressing in Nashville." He said: "It actually sounds good, if not better, than the original."

For the previously unreleased 1976 album, McGough also took the single tape that existed of the unmixed recordings and transferred it to digital, while Marbeck succeeded in locating the multi-track tapes of "Vegas", the final song Waves recorded. Gash said: "They are the only multi-tracks we have of any of our material, and therefore the only song we had the opportunity to do an actual mix on. And so, we have 'Vegas', recorded July 1977, mixed January 2013. We had to bake the tape at Stebbings prior to running it, but we retrieved everything. We then took those files to York St Studios in Parnell, where we mixed 'Vegas' with engineer Hayden Taylor and mastered the Mandrill sessions. I would have loved to have mixed them as well, but with the multi-tracks destroyed back in 1976, that was not an option."

The end result was the Waves album, remastered for both vinyl and CD, plus a bonus disc, Misfit, containing nine of the original 12 songs of the previously unheard second album. Five hundred copies of the vinyl album were pressed and 1000 copies of the double CD package. The band played at Real Groovy and signed copies of the new releases. Gash said: "We started rehearsing every weekend and working it back up. But it was lovely because people had come from all over the place to see us. Most of them were old, but not all of them. Some came up clutching their original Waves album, but then some of them also bought the new vinyl. Some we had to sign both, and some came up with After the Carnival. There was a flurry of doing interviews, stuff which I hadn't thought about for decades. It was exhausting but interesting. We were amazed at where the fans were: this radio programmer still had the T-shirts, that television producer wanted us to do the show because he was a massive fan. We were amazed at the level of interest and didn't expect it."

The band announced they were rehearsing and writing again for a new Waves album. Gash said: "I'm very conscious it's very hard to beat the old songs that people will love. You tend to disappoint people with your follow-up stuff, but having said that I think what we are doing now is better. It is just as song-based so it's not like it's gone somewhere else, but as songs there is some really strong material there.

"Kevin Wildman—who really only managed to put a stake in the ground twice, but they were spectacular songs—is now spinning them out practically one a week and there are some gems. So he has prompted me and David (Marshall) to try harder because we can't let them get away with that. It's always been a band with three writers."

== Discography ==
=== Albums ===
- Waves (Direction, 1975)
- Waves /Misfit (remastered) (Ode, 2013)

=== Singles ===
- "The Dolphin Song"/"Letters" (Direction, 1975)
- "Arrow"/Clock House Shuffle" (Direction, 1975)
- "At the Beach"/Waitress" (Direction, 1975)
