= Lyn Barnett =

New Zealand singer

- Barnett in 1974

Background information
- Also known as: Lynn Barnett, Lynne Barnett
- Born: Lynne Kera Barnett; 1945; Wellington, New Zealand
- Died: January–February 2017 Sydney, Australia
- Genre: Pop
- Occupation: Singer
- Years active: 1960s–1970's
- Labels: Viking, Lexian, RCA Victor

Lynne Kera Barnett (born 1945 – died early 2017) as Lyn Barnett was a New Zealand singer who had success in her home country. Later she moved to Australia and also became popular there. She made many appearances on Australian TV. She had a hit with a cover of "Please Mr. Postman". She was also the sister of singer Christine Barnett. She died in January or February 2017.

== Background ==
Barnett was born in Wellington, New Zealand.

Her sister Christine Barnett was a recording artist and had released a number of singles on the Lexian label, which included "Cry for You" and "Teenage Queen". Christine would also tour with Blerta in Australia in the 1970s.

In 1964 Lyn Barnett married Michael Puddefoot aka Mike Leyton, who sang in the Merseymen band.

== Career ==
=== 1960s ===
Barnett had a contract with the Viking label which ran from 1962 to 1963. During that period she released five singles. She also recorded an album Lyn for Viking backed by Garth Young and his Orchestra.

For the week ending 24 February 1962, Billboard reported that her version of "No Heart At All" was climbing rapidly in many charts. By 31 March, her recording of "Please Mr. Postman" entered the New Zealand Top 10. By 28 April, it was at no. 6. By 5 May, it was at no. 4.

In 1962, her album which was credited to Lyn Barnett with Garth Young and his orchestra was released on Viking. The tracks included "On Again Off Again", "This Little Boy Of Mine", "Please Mr. Postman", and "No Heart At All". The 7 July 1962 issue of Billboard reported that US Label Chancellor Records were very interested in her after Ron Dalton took her LP to the United States.

On 31 March 1963, she was booked to appear at the Stars of the Royal Command Show at the Opera House in New Plymouth. Other artists on the bill were Howard Morrison and Bill & Boyd. Also in 1963 she had "Birthday Party" bw "That's Why I Love Him" released on the Lexian label, the same label her sister Christine had at least four singles released on. The following year "What If Johnny Says No" bw "Second Hand Rose" was released on RCA Victor.

In February 1964 she was set to take part in the "Startime Spectacular" which would tour the North Island. It was organized by promoter Jim Haddleton. The artists headlining included herself, Bill & Boyd and Max Merritt & The Meteors. At the last moment Barnett had to cancel. Max Merritt suggested that Dinah Lee should replace her. Lee was doing nightly 30 minute slots backed by The Meteors. Impressed by what he saw, Haddleton signed her up for a management deal and took control of Lee's career. Also that year Barnett had married Mike Leyton, who sang in the Merseymen band and at some stage they moved to Sydney.

In June 1967, she appeared on the music show Bandstand. Also that year she appeared in a couple of episodes of The Go!! Show. She appeared with The Mixtures and The Ram Jam Big Band, which aired on 30 August 1967. On the episode that aired on 1 September 1967, Buddy England, The Groove and Billy Thorpe were also featured.

=== 1970s ===
In 1970, The New Zealand Herald reported in its 4 July issue that she was based in Sydney and was engaged for a two-week stint at Tommo's Place. The following year she was involved in a car crash. In 1974 she was featured in an article of the New Zealand Woman's Weekly in its 12 August issue. Also that year, Hammond Electrique by blind keyboard player Claude Papesch was released on the His Master's Voice label in Australia. The musicians that played on the album were Dave Donovan, Bruno Lawrence and Dave Ellis. She along with Papesch provided the backing vocals for the album. During 1974 and 1975 she appeared multiple times on the Ernie Sigley Show.

== Later years ==
In later years, she became reclusive. According to the Daily Telegraph, she would refuse to answer her phone. She was also a sufferer of the lung condition chronic obstructive pulmonary disease.

=== Death ===
She died at some point in January or February 2017. Her body had been lying undiscovered for about a month. The last time she was seen alive was on 30 January. Police found her body on 27 February after neighbours sounded an alarm. Her friend Garvan Dormer who she had known for 40 years had last seen her in December 2016. He said she was feeling a bit down. Dormer wasn't even aware that she had died and he only found out about her death on Wednesday 19 July when he was included in her will. Even her younger sister Christine didn't know she had died until Lyn's nephew in New Zealand was contacted on 21 July.

She was buried without a funeral.

== Discography ==
Singles
Title	Release info	Year	Peak Position	Notes
"No Heart At All" / "This Little Boy Of Mine"	Viking VS.68	1962		
"Please Mr. Postman" / "On Again, Off Again"	Viking VS. 74	1962	#4	
"Love Me To Pieces" / "Ya Gotta"	Viking VS.77	1962		
"Ordinary Guy" / "Aren't Some People Funny"	Viking 110	1962		
"Birthday Party" / "That's Why I Love Him"	Lexian LS-17	1963		
"What If Johnny Says No" / "Second Hand Rose"	RCA Victor 60384	1964		

Albums
Title	Release info	Year	Notes
Lyn	Viking VP 76	1962	

== Appearances ==
Various artist compilations
Title	Release info	Year	Track	Notes
Very Best Of Kiwi Rock & Roll	EMI – 7243 578451 2 0	2004	"Greasy Kids Stuff"	
Early Rock from New Zealand, Vol. 11–12	Collector/White Label 7758	2005	"Ya Gotta"	

Session and guest vocalist
Artist	Title	Release info	Year	Role	Notes
Claude Papesch	Hammond Electrique	Zodiac ZLP 1055	1974	Vocals	Australian version released on His Master's Voice SOELP-10175
