= The Kavaliers =

New Zealand rock band

- Origin: New Zealand
- Genres: Rock and roll
- Past members: Freddie Keil; Billy Belton; Dave Smith; Dave Paul; Brian Smith; Vic Williams; Jimmy Murphy

The Kavaliers were an early 1960s New Zealand rock and roll band that evolved out of a group called The Zodiacs and were fronted by Samoan born lead singer Freddie Keil. They released a string of singles in the 1960s. The band's name would be resurrected in the 2000s by Freddie's younger brother Alphonso Keil.

== The Zodiacs ==
The Zodiacs were fronted by Freddie Keil on lead vocals. Jimmy Murphy was their lead guitarist and Freddie's younger brother Alphonso Keil was the rhythm guitarist. Vic Williams was the drummer and John Harrison the bassist while Jimmy Langabeer played piano. After scuppered plans to record with the La Gloria label, they recorded on the Zodiac Records label. As such, they changed their name from the Zodiacs to the Kavaliers. When they were still called the Zodiacs, while Freddie Keil had returned to Western Samoa for a short time, they were fronted by Terry Dean and the Nitebeats singer, Terry Dean (also known as Terry Fidow).

=== The Zodiacs line up ===
- Freddie Keil, Vocals (Died 1994)
- Jimmy Murphy, Lead guitar
- Vic Williams, Drums
- John 'Yuk' Harrison, Bass
- Jimmy Langabeer, Piano
- Alphonso Keil, Rhythm guitar (Died 2008)
- Terry Dean aka Terry Fidow, Vocals

== The Kavaliers ==
After Freddie Keil had some problems with his cousin Herma Keil, he left the Keil Isles and formed The Zodiacs. They would later change their name to Freddie Keil and the Kavaliers. They released eleven singles and an album from 1960 to 1965.

=== The Kavaliers line up ===
- Freddie Keil, Vocals
- Billy Belton, Rhythm Guitar
- Steve Smith, Piano
- Dave Paul, Saxophone
- Brian Smith, Bass Guitar
- Vic Williams, Drums
- Jimmy Murphy, Lead Guitar
- Alphonso Keil, Drums

== Discography ==
=== Freddie Keil And The Kavaliers ===
- "I Found A New Love" / "Three Nights A Week" - Zodiac Z-1063 - (1961)
- "What About Me" / "Take Good Care of Her" - Zodiac Z-1079 (1962)
- "The Wanderer" / "Twisting The Night Away" - Zodiac Z-1085 - (1962
- "Should I" / "Its Only A Paper Moon" - Zodiac Z-1105 - (1963)
- "All The Other Boys Are Talking" / "Take These Chains from My Heart" - Zodiac Z-1109 - (1963)
- "Don't Try To Fight It Baby" / "No Signs Of Loneliness Here" - Zodiac Z-1114 - (1963)
- "Girls" / "Learnin', Trying To Forgive" - Zodiac Z-1147- (1963)

=== The Kavaliers ===
- "The Twist" / "Tossin' And Turning" Zodiac Z-1082 (1962) - (Note A-side was credited to Freddie Keil)

== The Maori Kavaliers ==
They were a 1960s band that were more or less a spin-off from Freddie Keil & the Kavaliers, rather than an extension of the group. The group consisted of ex Freddie Keil and the Kavaliers members, Brian Smith and Billy Peters. Their name came about because of Smith and Peter's past association with the group.

== Alphonso Keil and The Kavalliers ==
Alphonso Keil, the younger brother of Freddie Keil, was born in Samoa in 1944, and was a child when he came to New Zealand. In the late 1950s, he was the rhythm guitarist for a group called The Sundowners. He also played some guitar for the Keil Isles. He was a cousin of founding members Olaf, Herma, Rudolf and Klaus. He was also rhythm guitar player for the Zodiacs. His playing can be heard along with Vic Williams, Jimmy Langabeer and Jimmy Murphy on "Be Bop A Lula" that features on the Pie Cart Rock 'n' Roll compilation. He was also the drummer for Freddie Keil & The Kavaliers. He formed a version of this group many years later in 2002. There were a few different musicians in this line up with lead guitarist Clive Whelan, Alphonso Keil rhythm guitar, drummer Mike Beck, various bass players and Steve Smith on keyboards. Bass guitarist Bruce Jarvis joined in 2006. Instead of the group being called The Kavaliers they were now called The Kavalliers.

In addition to being member of various New Zealand rock and roll recording groups, Alphonso Keil was an Elvis Presley impersonator, who was inspired by Andy Stankovich, an Elvis tribute artist. Keil was well known for his participation in the annual Elvis in the Park concerts in Henderson, Auckland.

He died in 2008 at age 64 from cancer, but the rest of the band carried on as The Kavalliers.

=== Members ===
- Alphonso Keil - died July 2008
- Clive Whelan, Lead Guitar - Retired January 2010
- Bruce Jarvis, Bass/Vocals - Joined 2006
- Mike Beck, drums
- Robert Pattinson, keyboards

== The Kavalliers in 2010 ==
Since Alphonso Keil died in 2008, the band has continued. Mac McInman then came in as rhythm guitar/vocals. Clive Whelan, the lead guitarist, retired in January 2010. Mike Beck left the band. Pete Traille joined as lead guitar/vocals and Andy Shackleton stepped in as drummer/vocals. At this point in time, 2011, the group consists of Bruce Jarvis, Mac McInman, Pete Traille and Andy Shackleton. The group still performs regularly, and with great success, at venues and private functions around Auckland, New Zealand.

www.kavalliers.co.nz

=== Line up ===
- Pete Traille - Lead Guitar/Vocals
- Mac McInman - Rhythm Guitar/Vocals
- Bruce Jarvis - Bass/Vocals
- Andy Shackleton - Drums/Vocals
