= Eliza Keil =

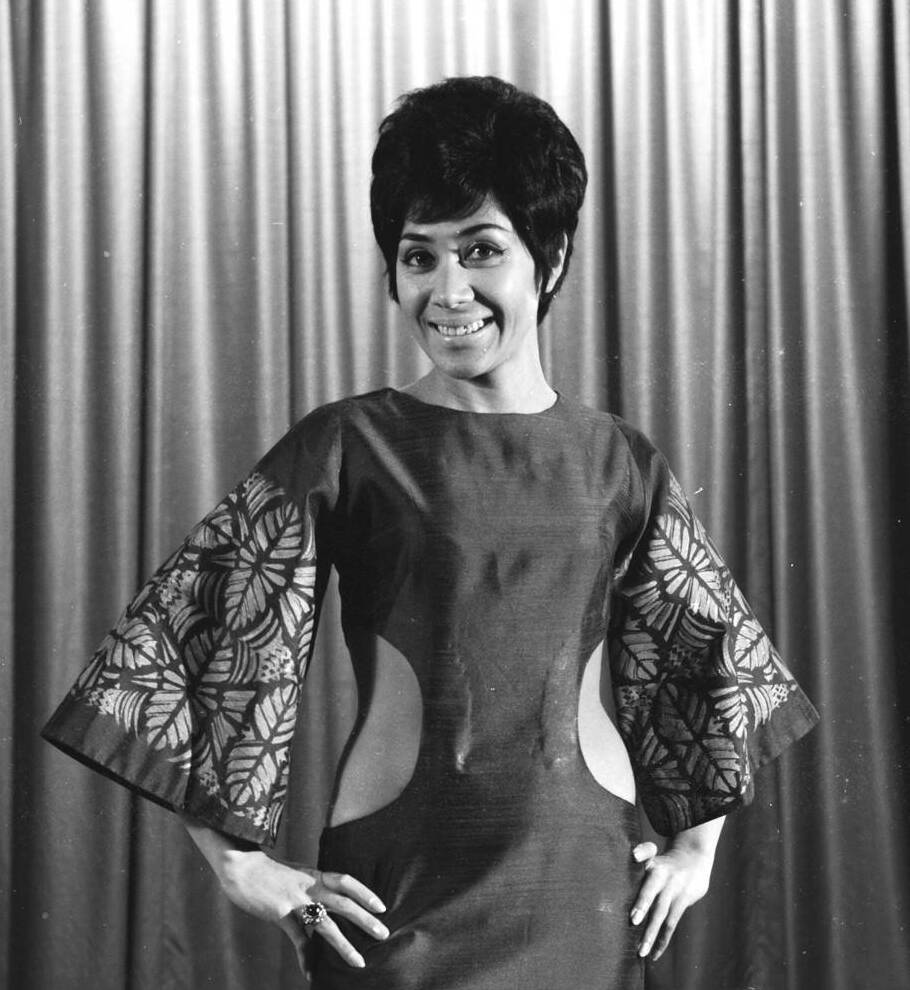
- Keil in 1968

Background information
- Origin: Western Samoa
- Genres: pop,
- Occupation: Musician
- Instrument: Vocals
- Years active: 1956– ?
- Labels: Viking Records, Salem Records, Philips Records, Family Records

Samoan-born Eliza Keil started out singing with her brothers in the popular New Zealand rock & roll group the Keil Isles and would later become a solo artist in her own right with a string of TV appearances and a part in a film.

== Career ==
=== 1960s ===
Eliza Keil was the sister of Olaf, Herma and Klaus Keil. She was also the cousin of Freddie and Alphonso. In approximately a ten-year period she had at least five singles released as well as three albums from 1967 to 1973.

In 1966 she and brother Herma appeared in the film Don't Let It Get To You. This film also featured Kiri Te Kanawa and Sir Howard Morrison.

In or around 1967 she was a regular resident singer on Television New Zealand's "C'mon" show. She was on the touring spectacular of the show with her brother Herma. She was invited to guest on his farewell tour for New Zealand singing star Mr Lee Grant in 1968.

=== 1970s ===
In 1970, her album Raindrops Keep Fallin' On My Head, which was arranged by Don Richardson was released on the Philips label. It was reported that year in the March 28 edition of The New Zealand Herald that she and her seven-piece backing group were on a tour, doing a round of the Pacific Islands. She was to perform in Fiji, Western Samoa and American Samoa, doing stage shows and a hotel engagement.

In later years she moved to the United States with her brothers and sisters. Her parents were in the States and her move there in 1972 was partly to gain some overseas experience.

== Releases ==
=== 45 ===
- Unloved, Unwanted / When The Man in the Moon – Viking VS 085 (1962)
- "Somewhere My Love" / "Homeward Bound" – Salem XS 114 (1967)
- "Raindrops Keep Falling on My Head" / "The White Rose of Athens" Philips 6036004 (1970)
- "Every Day Is Sunday" / "Something in the Way She Moves" – Family 1011 (1972)
- "You'll Never Be Young Again" / "Evil Ways" – Family 1012 (1972)

=== LP ===
- Live at Logan Park – Salem XP 5036 (1967)
- Raindrops Keep Falling on My Head – Philips 633 4005 (1970)
- Your Songs – Family FLY 200 (1973)

Compilation appearances

- 20 Studio One Hits - "Everyday Is Sunday" - Music for Leisure 440 - 1972

== Film and television appearances ==
- Don't Let It Get To You
