= SMS Budapest =

Austro-Hungarian Navy's Monarch-class coastal defense ship

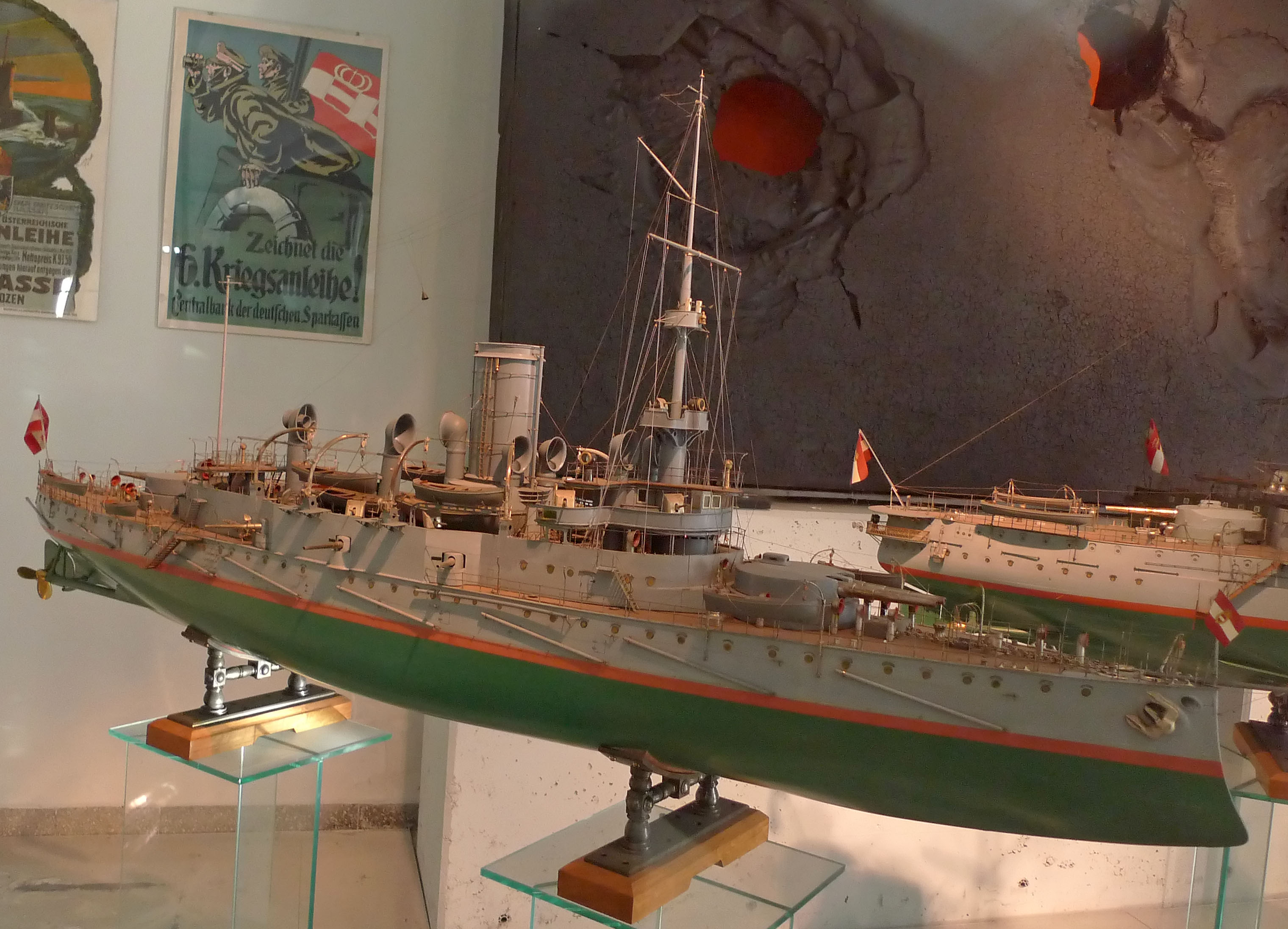
- A model of Budapest at the Heeresgeschichtliches Museum, Vienna

History

Austro-Hungarian Empire
- Name: SMS Budapest
- Namesake: Budapest, Hungary
- Ordered: May 1892
- Builder: Stabilimento Tecnico Triestino, Trieste
- Laid down: 16 February 1893
- Launched: 27 April 1896
- Sponsored by: Countess Marie Széchényí-Andrássy
- Commissioned: 12 May 1898
- Decommissioned: 11 March 1918
- Fate: Scrapped, 1921

General characteristics
- Class & type: Monarch-class coastal defense ship
- Displacement: 5,785 tonnes (5,694 long tons) (full load)
- Length: 99.22 m (325 ft 6 in)
- Beam: 17 m (55 ft 9 in)
- Draught: 6.4 m (21 ft 0 in)
- Installed power: 9,100 ihp (6,800 kW); 16 × Belleville boilers
- Propulsion: 2 × Shafts; 2 × Vertical triple-expansion steam engines
- Speed: 17.8 knots (33.0 km/h; 20.5 mph)
- Range: 3,500 nmi (6,500 km; 4,000 mi) @ 9 knots (17 km/h; 10 mph)
- Complement: 26 officers and 397 enlisted men
- Armament: 2 × 2 - 240 mm (9.4 in) Krupp guns; 6 × 1 - 150 mm (5.9 in) Škoda guns; 1 × 7 cm (2.8 in) anti-aircraft gun; 10 × 1 - 47 mm (1.9 in) Škoda guns; 4 × 1 - 47 mm (1.9 in) Hotchkiss guns; 2 × 450 mm (17.7 in) torpedo tubes
- Armour: Waterline belt: 120–270 mm (4.7–10.6 in); Deck: 40 mm (1.6 in); Gun turrets: 250 mm (9.8 in); Casemate: 80 mm (3.1 in); Conning tower: 220 mm (8.7 in)

SMS Budapest (Note: "SMS" stands for "Seiner Majestät Schiff ", or "His Majesty's Ship" in German.) ("His Majesty's Ship Budapest") was a Monarch-class coastal defense ship built for the Austro-Hungarian Navy in the 1890s. After their commissioning, Budapest and the two other Monarch-class ships made several training cruises in the Mediterranean Sea in the early 1900s. Budapest and her sisters formed the 1st Capital Ship Division of the Austro-Hungarian Navy until they were replaced by the newly commissioned Habsburg-class pre-dreadnought battleships at the turn of the century. In 1906 the three Monarchs were placed in reserve and only recommissioned during the annual summer training exercises. After the start of World War I, Budapest was recommissioned and assigned to 5th Division together with her sisters.

The division was sent to Cattaro in August 1914 to attack Montenegrin and French artillery that was bombarding the port, and they remained there until mid-1917. Budapest and her sister Wien were sent to Trieste in August and bombarded Italian fortifications in the Gulf of Trieste. The ship was briefly decommissioned in early 1918 and became an accommodation ship, but she was fitted with a large siege howitzer for shore bombardment shortly afterwards and recommissioned. A shortage of ammunition caused the gun to be removed before it could be used, and Budapest reverted to her previous role. The ship was awarded to Great Britain by the Paris Peace Conference in 1920. The British sold her for scrap, and she was broken up in Italy beginning in 1921.

== Description and construction ==
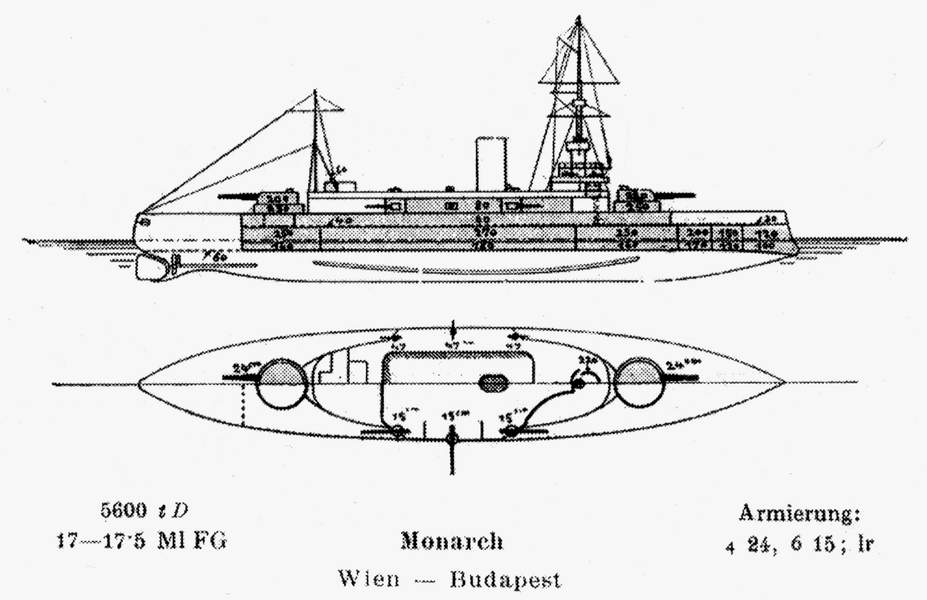
Right elevation and plan of the Monarch class; the shaded area is armored.

At only 5,785 tonnes (5,694 long tons) maximum displacement, the Monarch class was less than half the size of the battleships of other major navies at the time and were officially designated as coast defense ships. The Austro-Hungarian government believed that the role of its navy was solely to defend her coast.

Budapest had an overall length of 99.22 meters (325 ft 6 in), a beam of 17 meters (55 ft 9 in) and a draft of 6.4 meters (21 ft 0 in). Her two 4-cylinder vertical triple-expansion steam engines produced a total of 9,100 indicated horsepower (6,800 kW) using steam from 16 Belleville boilers. These gave the ship a maximum speed of 17.8 knots (33.0 km/h; 20.5 mph). Budapest's maximum load of 500 metric tons (490 LT) of coal gave her a range of 3,500 nautical miles (6,500 km; 4,000 mi) at a speed of 9 knots (17 km/h; 10 mph). She was manned by 26 officers and 397 enlisted men, a total of 423 personnel.

The armament of the Monarch class consisted of four 240-millimeter (9.4 in) Krupp K/94 guns mounted in two twin-gun turrets, one each fore and aft of the superstructure. The ships carried 80 rounds for each gun. Their secondary armament was six 150-millimeter (6 in) Škoda guns located in casemates in the superstructure. Defense against torpedo boats was provided by ten quick-firing (QF) 47 mm (1.9 in) Škoda guns and four 47-millimeter QF Hotchkiss guns. The ships also mounted two 450-millimeter (18 in) torpedo tubes, one on each broadside. Each torpedo tube was provided with two torpedoes. In 1917 a Škoda 7 cm K10 anti-aircraft gun was installed.

The ship's nickel-steel waterline armor belt was 120–270 millimeters (4.7–10.6 in) thick, and the gun turrets were protected by 250 millimeters (9.8 in) of armor. The casemates had 80 millimeters (3.1 in) thick sides while the conning tower had 220 millimeters (8.7 in) of armor. Budapest's deck armor was 40 millimeters (1.6 in) thick.

The Monarch-class ships were ordered in May 1892 with Budapest and Wien to be built at the Stabilimento Tecnico Triestino shipyard in Trieste. Both ships were laid down on 16 February 1893, the first ships in the class to be laid down. Budapest was launched on 27 April 1896 by Countess Marie Széchényí-Andrássy, wife of the Governor of Fiume, and commissioned on 12 May 1898.

== Service history ==
=== Peacetime ===
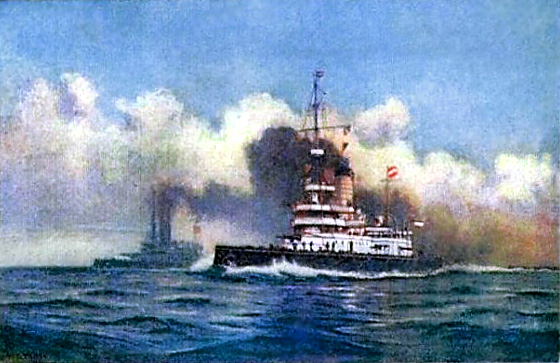
A painting from Alexander Kircher showing SMS Wien and the other ships of the Monarch class on maneuvers

Budapest and her sisters formed the Navy's 1st Capital Ship Division (I. Schwere Division), and Budapest conducted the first wireless telegraphy trials in the Navy when she was briefly fitted with a Marconi radio in December 1898. In late 1899 the division made a training cruise to the Eastern Mediterranean where they made port visits in Greece, Lebanon, Turkey and Malta. In early 1902 they made another training cruise to the Western Mediterranean with port visits in Algeria, Spain, France, Italy, Corfu, and Albania. The ship was fitted with a Siemens-Braun radio early the following year. The ships of the division were inspected by Archduke Franz Ferdinand, the heir to the throne, in March 1903 at Gravosa. Shortly afterwards, Budapest, Wien, the battleship Habsburg and the destroyer Magnet made a cruise to the Eastern Mediterranean. In 1904, the Monarch-class ships formed the 2nd Capital Ship Division, and they took part in the 1904 cruise of the Adriatic and Mediterranean Seas as well as training exercises in which the three Habsburg-class battleships engaged the Budapest and her sisters in simulated combat. Those maneuvers marked the first time two homogeneous squadrons consisting of modern battleships operated in the Austro-Hungarian Navy.

The Monarchs were relegated to the newly formed Reserve Squadron on 1 January 1906 and were only recommissioned for the annual summer exercises. They participated in a fleet review by Archduke Franz Ferdinand in September conducted in the Kolocepski Channel near Šipan. The ships were briefly recommissioned at the beginning of 1913 as the 4th Division after the start of the Second Balkan War, but were decommissioned again on 10 March. From December 1912 to March 1913 the ship's commander was future Hungarian leader Miklós Horthy.

=== World War I ===
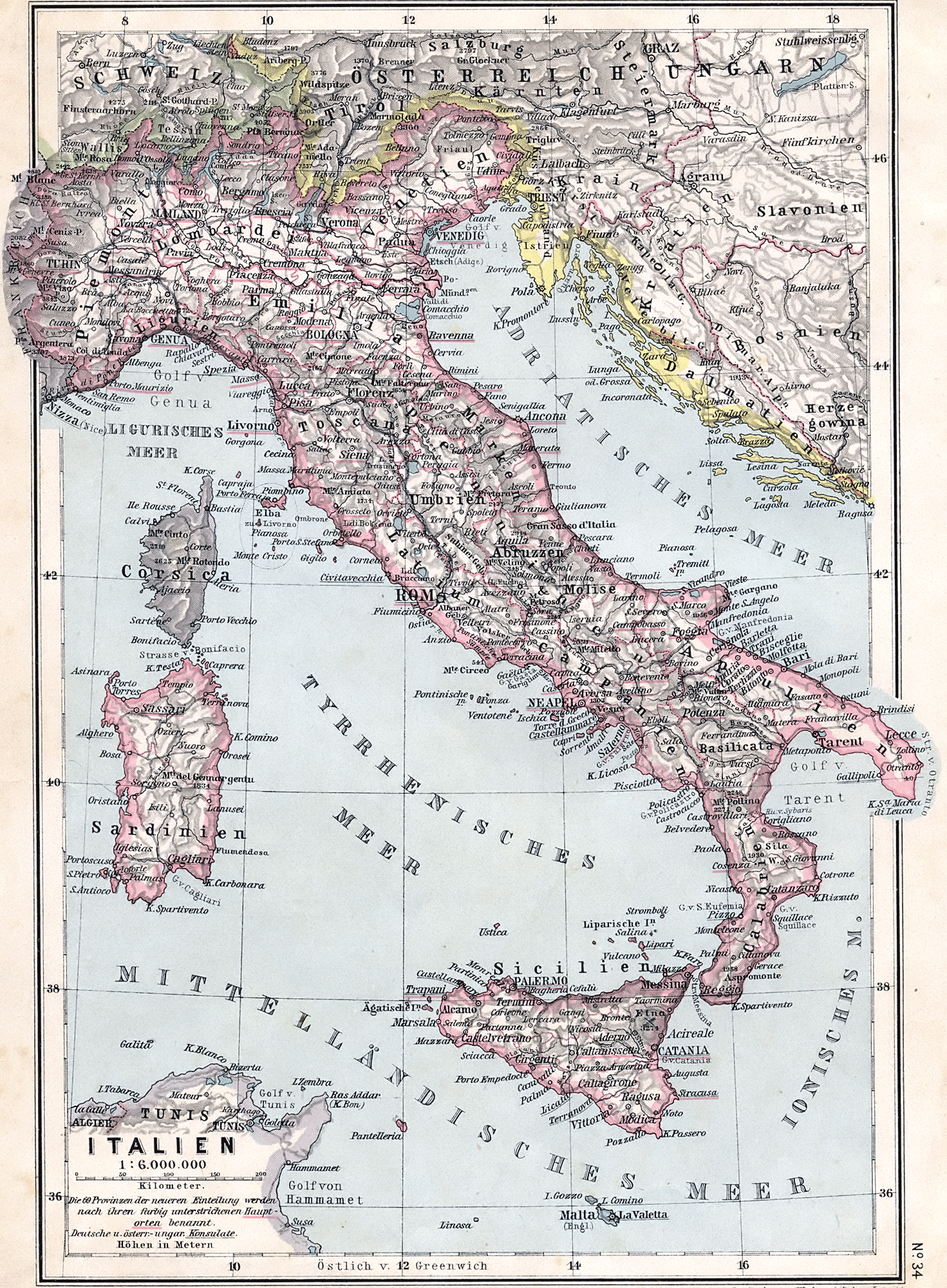
A map of the upper Adriatic Sea

With the beginning of World War I the three Monarchs were recommissioned as the 5th Division. They were sent to the Bay of Kotor in August 1914 to attack Montenegrin artillery batteries on Mount Lovćen bombarding the Austro-Hungarian naval base at Cattaro and the fortifications defending it. Budapest and her sisters arrived on 13 August, but their guns could not elevate enough to engage all of the enemy artillery, which was reinforced by eight French guns on 19 October. The battleship Radetzky was summoned to deal with the guns two days later, and she managed to knock out several French guns and forced the others to withdraw by 27 October. When the Austro-Hungarian army was finally able to launch an offensive into Montenegro in January 1916, SMS Budapest was on hand to assist the ground troops against Lovćen's defences. The battleship's 9.5 inch and 6 inch guns pounded Montenegrin positions and on January 10 the ground forces took the Lovćen Pass and the adjacent heights where the French gun positions had been. In order for its guns to elevate high enough to hit the Montenegrin lines at the top of the mountain Budapest had to be trimmed 7 degrees. The naval bombardment played a decisive role in breaking the morale of the mountain's defenders and Montenegro requested an armistice two days later.

Budapest was subsequently called to action in the Adriatic on 15 May 1917 when an Austro-Hungarian force of three light cruisers and destroyer escorts, returning from a major attack on the Otranto Straits, were intercepted by a stronger force of Allied warships led by HMS Dartmouth. The armoured cruiser SMS Sanct George with two destroyers and four torpedo-boats under Kontra-Admiral Alexander Hansa headed off to support the beleaguered Austrian force. Upon receiving news from a naval flying boat that nine enemy ships were in the vicinity of the Otranto force, Hansa called for SMS Budapest which immediately put to sea with three high seas torpedo boats as escorts. Upon sighting the smoke from the approaching Austro-Hungarian warships the Allied ships turned away and returned to port. The Sanct George and the Budapest escorted their little fleet, as it had become, back to Cattaro.

The Monarchs remained at Cattaro until mid-1917 to deter any further attacks. In August, Budapest and Wien were transferred to Trieste to serve as guard ships against Italian commando raids. Each ship was fitted with a 66-millimeter (2.6 in) anti-aircraft gun after their arrival on 26 August to counter intense Italian air attacks. Wien was damaged by a near miss on 5 September, and both ships withdrew to Pola on 12 September. They returned to Trieste on 30 October and sortied into the Gulf of Trieste on 16 November to attack Italian coastal defenses at Cortellazzo, near the mouth of the Piave River. Budapest and Wien opened fire at 10:35 at a range of about 9–10 kilometers (5.6–6.2 mi) and knocked out most of the Italian guns after about a half-hour. Their bombardment was interrupted by several unsuccessful Italian air attacks before a more coordinated attack was made by five MAS torpedo boats and five aircraft around 13:30. This was also unsuccessful, and the last Italian coast defense gun was knocked out an hour later. The ships had sustained only minor damage from several hits and near-misses, and not a single sailor was wounded.

Emperor Karl inspected Budapest on 19 November at Trieste. Anxious to revenge themselves against the Austro-Hungarians, the Royal Italian Navy (Regia Marina) planned an attack on the two ships in their berths in the Bay of Muggia, near Trieste, by MAS boats. On the night of 9/10 December, two MAS boats managed to penetrate the harbor defenses undetected, and fired torpedoes at Wien and Budapest. The torpedoes fired at the Budapest struck the mole of the seaplane station, but Wien was hit twice and capsized in five minutes, killing 46 of the crew.

Budapest was scheduled for a shore bombardment on 12 December, but was postponed for a week by bad weather. Escorted by the light cruiser Admiral Spaun, six destroyers, nine torpedo boats and a dozen minesweepers, Budapest and the pre-dreadnought Árpád bombarded the Castellazzo fortifications on 19 December. The ship transferred to Pola two days later, and she was decommissioned on 11 March 1918. She became the accommodation ship for the submarine staff (Wohnschiff der U-Bootleitung). Just over a week later, Admiral Franz von Keil proposed that a 38-centimeter siege howitzer be installed to bombard the Castellazzo fortifications. Little time was wasted, and removal of the forward gun turret and its barbette began on 26 March. The installation of the 38-centimeter (15 in) gun was completed on 4 April although testing did not begin until 5 June when three shots were fired. The ship was recommissioned two days later with a reduced crew, and a practice shoot was conducted with unsatisfactory results on 6 August. Another training exercise scheduled for 20 August had to be cancelled for lack of ammunition. The howitzer was removed on 11 October and sent to the Army on 17 October. Budapest resumed her former role and remained at Pola. She was handed over to Great Britain as war reparations in January 1920 and broken up for scrap in Italy in 1921.
