= Keyl =

Keyl is a surname. Notable people with the surname include:

- Bernhard Keil or Keyl (1624–1687), Danish Baroque painter
- Ernst G. W. Keyl (1804–1872), German-American Lutheran minister
- Frederick William Keyl (1823–1871), German-British painter
- Julius Keyl (1877–1959), German athlete and gymnast

== See also ==
- Keil (disambiguation)
