= Stebbing Studios =

Recording studio in Auckland, New Zealand

Coordinates: 36°50′42.64″S 174°44′23.55″E

Stebbing Recording Studios
- Stebbing Recording Centre
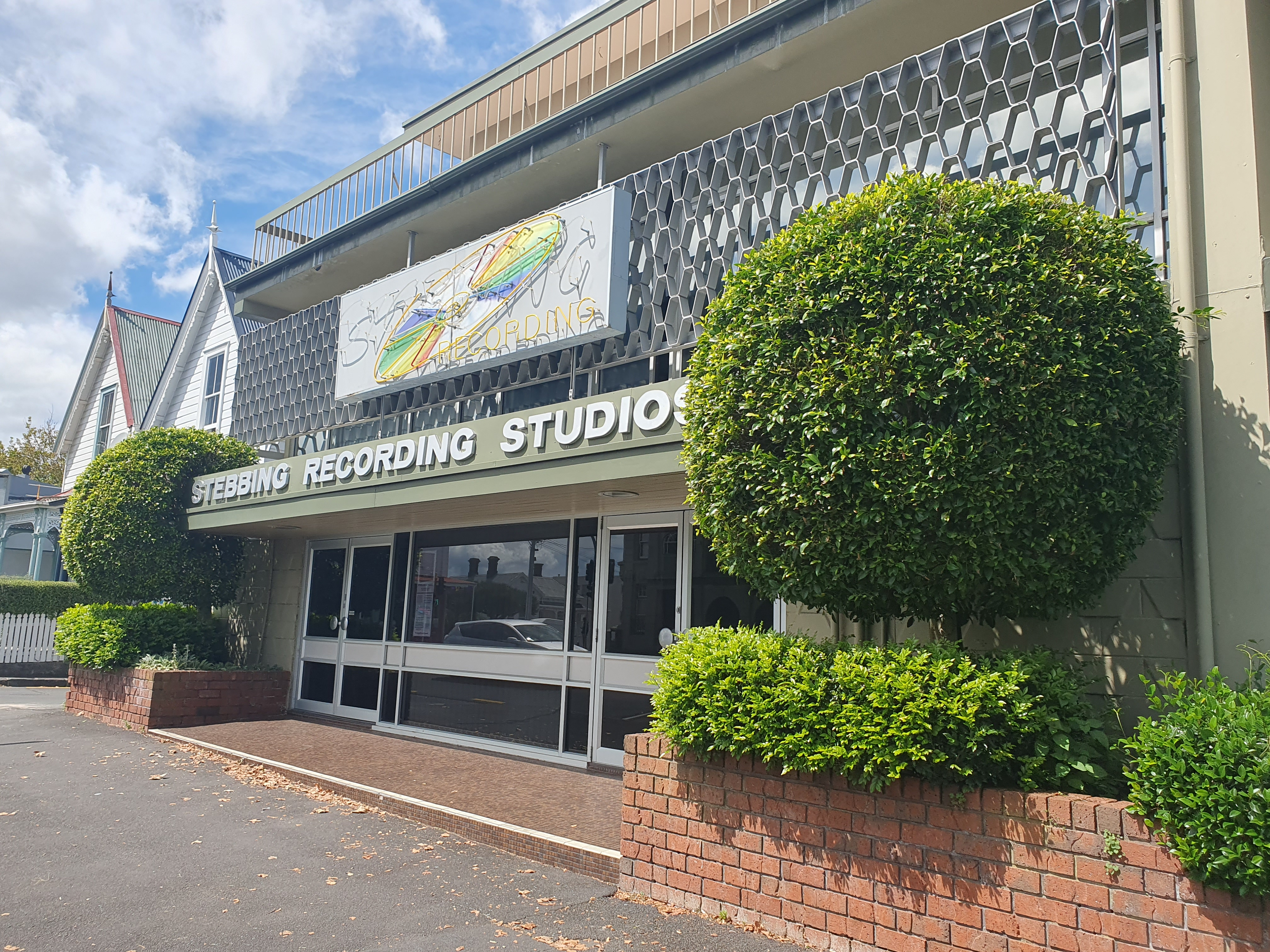
- Interactive map of Stebbing Recording Studios
- Owner: Stebbing family

Construction
- Opened: 1970

Website
- https://www.stebbing.co.nz

Stebbing Studios is a recording studio in Auckland, New Zealand. Artists who have recorded at the studio over the years include Ray Columbus & The Invaders, Split Enz, Gary Havoc & The Hurricanes, Th' Dudes, The Human Instinct, and Waves.

The studio was founded by Eldred Stebbing, who also founded pioneer New Zealand music label Zodiac Records. Stebbing originally set up a recording studio in the basement of his family home in the Auckland suburb of Avondale in 1946. He later built the Stebbing Recording Centre in 1970 on Jervois Road, where it is still in operation today. The studio is well known for its importance to New Zealand music history, and is considered iconic.

== History ==
=== 1970s ===
In 1970, the Stebbing Recording Centre was constructed on Jervois Road. At the time, Stebbing was the first studio in New Zealand to feature eight track recording technology.

During 1974-1975, New Zealand singer-songwriter John Hanlon recorded at Stebbing. In December 1974, Dragon recorded their Scented Gardens for the Blind album at the studio. Also during 1974-1975, The Human Instinct recorded tracks for their Peg Leg album. The master tapes from the original sessions went missing inside the Stebbing archives, and were later rediscovered in 2001. Australian Jazz musician Don Burrows recorded his album The Tasman Connection at Stebbing, which was released on the Cherry Pie label in 1976.

=== 1980s ===
By 1981, Stebbing Studios was one of four New Zealand recording studios to feature twenty four track recording facilities.

=== 1990s ===
In 1999, the studio entered into a CD production venture with Hargon International. Stebbing later bought Hargon out and invested $10 million in a new CD/DVD manufacturing plant that opened the same year in Ponsonby, close to the original recording studios. The plant became the largest CD/DVD replication facility in New Zealand, producing 60,000 units a day at its peak.

=== 2000s ===
By the 2000s, the main studio had been expanded to accommodate up to sixty musicians.

Eldred Stebbing died in 2009, aged 88.

=== 2020s ===
In 2023, Stebbing announced their expansion into producing vinyl LPs, based out of the same manufacturing facility as their CD/DVD plant. The plant was originally scheduled to open in March 2023, but the arrival of the record press was delayed by the 2023 Auckland Anniversary Weekend floods. The plant opened in August 2023, with the ability to manufacture 900 records a day.

== Recorded artists ==
=== Partial list ===
- Waves - Waves - 1975
- Gary Havoc & The Hurricanes - Havoc! - 1979
- Bill & Boyd - The Very Best of Bill & Boyd - 2003
- Royal New Zealand Navy Band - He Waita Moana (Ocean Songs) - 2014

== Remastering, duplication, etc. ==
- The Yardmen - Bricks And Mortar - (2010) (duplication)
- Ray Woolf - Ray Woolf - The Sixties Collection - 2012 (remastering)
