= Keill =

Keill is a Scottish family name that may refer to:

- James Keill (1673–1719), Scottish physician and philosopher
- Jason Keill, New Zealand musician
- John Keill (1671–1721), Scottish mathematician and astronomer

== See also ==
- Keill Randor, fictional character in Douglas Hill's The Last Legionary book series
- Keeill, a chapel on the Isle of Man
- Keills Chapel, Scotland
- Keil (disambiguation)
