= Don Richardson (arranger) =

Donald George Evan Richardson (2 March 1928 – 6 March 2008) was a musical arranger, producer, bandleader and promoter in New Zealand. As a songwriter, his songs became hits for some well, known New Zealand artists, including Saint Paul for Shane.

== Background ==
He was born Donald George Evan Richardson in Wellington on 2 March 1928. He went to school at Rongotai College. In his young years, he was something of a prodigy, playing the saxophone.

As a teenager, Richardson joined an outfit called the Kiwi Review as a saxophonist. In the 1960s, he became a prominent musical arranger. His arrangements became hits for artists such as Allison Durbin, Mr Lee Grant, and Craig Scott. He was also very well known in Wellington as a bandleader. He also got recognition as a promoter.

== Career ==
=== 1950s ===
During the mid 1950s, he was leading The Don Richardson Band. The band was made up of Richardson on sax, Mike Gibbs on trumpet, Johnny Williams on sax. Vern Clare on drums, Graeme Saker on double bass, and Bob Barcham on piano.

=== 1960s ===
He did the arrangements for the single by Tony And The Initials, "End Of Summer" backed with "Again - Off Again". This was released on the W & G label in 1963. In 1969, the single "Saint Paul, which was produced by Peter Dawkins, and arranged by him became a number one hit, staying in that position for six weeks.

=== 1970s ===
He did the arrangements for Eliza Keil's album Raindrops Keep Fallin' On My Head, which was released on the Philips label in 1970. In 1971, he did the arrangements for the a single by Abe Phillips who died later that year. The song "Don't Think You Remember Me", which had the backing of New Zealand Symphony Orchestra was described in an article as being "hauntingly beautiful". Also that year, he worked with producer Peter Dawkins on a Bunny Walters single, "Can't Keep You Out Of My Heart" as musical director. He produced the single "Life On Mars" backed for Steve Allen, which was released in 1972.

== Death ==
He died just after his 80th birthday. The death was possibly as a result of choking during dinner. This resulted in a coma and he died in Wellington Hospital on 6 March 2008. He was aged 80.
