= Keil Isles =

New Zealand-based rock & roll group

The Keil Isles
- Origin: New Zealand
- Genre: Rock & Roll
- Years active: 1956 - ?
- Past members: Olaf Keil; Herman Keil aka Herma Keil; Rudolf Keil; Klaus Keil; Freddie Keil

The Keil Isles were a New Zealand-based Rock & Roll group which consisted of the Keil Brothers, Olaf, Herman, Rudolf, Klaus and their cousin Freddie Keil. They were all Samoans with German ancestry.

== Band history ==
Their lead guitarist Olaf Keil was born in Apia, Western Samoa in 1934 and came to New Zealand when he was about 18 years of age. He began playing guitar in a band that his uncle had. His cousin Fredde would ask him to back him on rock & roll songs. Later on the other brothers became proficient and they formed the band in 1956. Freddie Keil left the band in the early 1960s after having a falling out with cousin Herma. He went on to form his own band.

Having covered "Quarter to Three" by Gary US Bonds, the group covered the "The Twist" which had been recorded by Chubby Checker. It was reported in the 18 December 1961 issue of Billboard Music Week that the Keil Isles version had been bought by NZBS for all radio stations.

In 1966 the group appeared in the 1966 musical comedy film Don't Let It Get You. After becoming very popular, selling records and having hits, the band went through numerous personnel changes, and by 1967 there were no members of the Keil family left in the band.

During their popularity their version of The Twist sold more copies in New Zealand than the Chubby Checker version did.

== Awards ==
The Keil Isles received The Lifetime Achievement Award at The Aotearoa Music Awards (formally known as New Zealand Music Awards) in 2012. Forever marking their spot in New Zealand's music industry.

== Line Up ==
- Olaf Keil (Lead Guitar)
- Herma Keil (Rhythm Guitar)
- Rudolph Keil (Bass Guitar)
- Klaus Keil (Drums)
- Freddie Keil (Vocals)
- Eliza Keil (Vocals)
- Helga Keil (Vocals)
- Lou Miller (Bass) - Replaced Rudolf in 1959
- Bill Fairs (Saxophone)
- Heke Kewene (Piano)
- Norman Akers (Piano) - Replaced Heke Kewene
- Brian Henderson (Piano) - Replaced Norman Akers
- Johnny Walker (Lead Guitar) - Replaced Klaus Keil
- Warren McMillan (Bass) - Replaced Lou Miller
- Puni Solomon (Bass) - Replaced Warren McMillan
- George Barna (Saxophone) - Replaced Bill Fairs
- Red Williamson (Drums) - Replaced Klaus Keil

=== Others ===
- Brian Henderson (Piano)
- Roger Skinner (Guitar)
- Billy Kristian (Bass)
- Jimmy Hill (Drums)

=== Occasional member ===
- Alphonso Keil (Rhythm guitar)

== Releases ==
=== 45 Rpm ===
- Apache / Good Night Irene - Viking VS 50
- In The Hall Of The Mountain King / Jalisco - Viking VP 173 - (1965)

=== EP ===
- Twistin' And A' Rockin' - Viking VEEP 8 - (1964)

=== LP ===
- Take Off With The Keil Isles - Viking VP 57 - (1961) (New Zealand)
- I Could Have Danced All Night - Viking VP 84 - (1962) (New Zealand)
- Herma And The Keil Isles - Viking VP 101 - (1963) (New Zealand)
- The Sound Of Herma & The Keil Isles - Viking VP.167 - (1965) (New Zealand)
- Keils A Go Go - Salem XP 5028 (New Zealand) (1966)
- Twenty Rock & Roll Hits - Regal SREG 30221 - (1980) (New Zealand)
- Rock From The Other Side Vol. 4 - Down South Records DS.9214 - (1987) (Holland)

=== Compact Disc ===
- Keil Isles, The - Early Rock & Roll From New Zealand - Vol. 1 & 2 - Collector Records - CLCD 7753/A/B (Netherlands)
