= Claude Papesch =

New Zealand musician

- Born: New Plymouth, New Zealand
- Died: 2 February 1987
- Occupation: Musician
- Instruments: Organ, piano, saxophone
- Label: His Master's Voice

Claude Papesch was a blind multi-instrumentalist from New Zealand. He played with many New Zealand outfits as well as well known Australian blues groups, Chain and Savage Rose. He also was a solo artist and released recordings of his own. He has an important place in New Zealand rock & roll history.

== Background ==
Papesch was originally from New Plymouth. He moved to Auckland when he was young.

== Career ==
=== New Zealand ===
In the late 1950s, he was a member of Johnny Devlin's band Johnny Devlin & the Devils. He played both piano and saxophone while the group. In 1964, he was the musical director for two of New Zealand's major record companies. Also in that year, he wrote a song for Wellington singer Maurice Cook which was recorded with an orchestral backing. He had multiple roles in the recording session as arranger the, directing the recording session, playing the piano and adding his vocal backing. In 1966, it was reported in the edition of 7 May of The New Zealand Herald that he was the head tutor of the New Zealand College of Entertainers in Auckland. He was also its founder.

=== Australia ===
Papesch came over to Australia with Tim Piper and they both played in an early formation of Chain. His keyboard playing was evident on the B side of a Chain single, "Mr. Time". He was with the group from August to October 1969. Then Papesch along with Ace Follington and Tim Piper left Chain to form Savage Rose.

In 1973 his album Hammond Spectacular was released on His Master's Voice SOEX-10021. The following year Hammond Electrique was also released. Lyn Barnett helped with backing vocals on Hammond Electrique.

=== Politics ===
He was elected Deputy Mayor of the Blue Mountains City Council in 1984. He also represented the Blue Mountains, Lithgow and Rylstone districts. Due to illness, he left his public position. He was also an active member of the Labor Party.

== Death ==
Papesch died on 2 February 1987 at age 45. He was survived by his partner, son, and daughter.

== Discography ==
Singles
Act	Title	Release info	Year	Notes
Claude Papesch and the Peter Posa Combo	"In Apple Blossom Time" / "Danny Boy"	Zodiac Z45 1065	11960	NZ release
Claude Papesch	"In The Chapel In The Moonlight" / "Sweetie Baby"	Philips 338041PF	1964	NZ release
Claude Papesch	"Yoshiko" / "Chapter Four"	Philips PF 338051	1964	NZ release
Claude Papesch	"The Way You Look At Him" / "Something You Got"	His Master's Voice HR.230	1965	NZ release
Claude Papesch	"Not The Way To Move Me " / "Petra"	EMI EMI-10882	1975	Aust release

Albums
Title	Release info	Year	Notes
Hammond Spectacular	His Master's Voice SOEX-10021	1973	Australian release
Hammond Electrique	Zodiac ZLP 1055	1974	NZ release
Hammond Electrique	His Master's Voice SOELP-10175	1974	Aust release
