= Johnny Devlin =

New Zealand singer, songwriter (born 1938)

Johnny Devlin MNZM
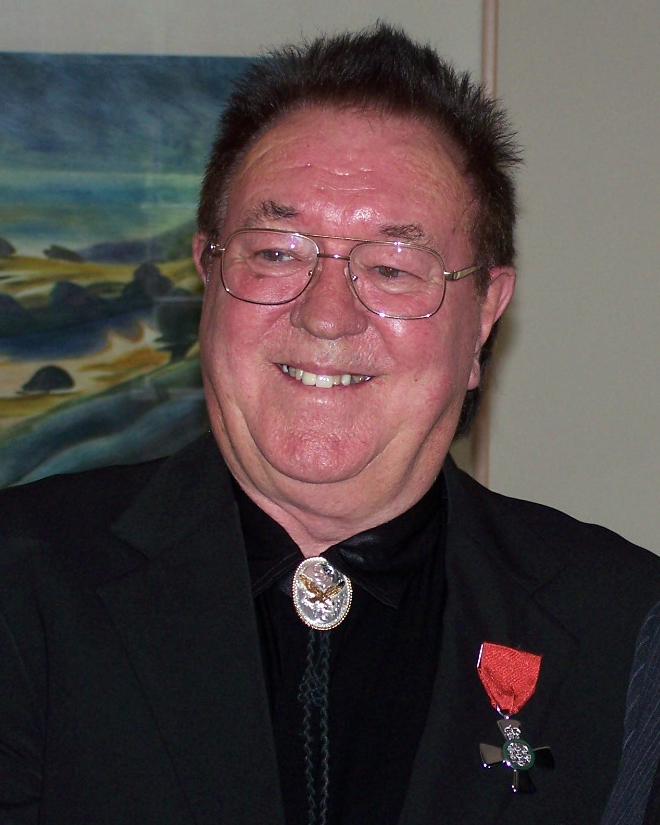
- Devlin in 2008

Background information
- Born: John Lockett Devlin; 11 May 1938 (age 88); Raetihi, New Zealand
- Genre: Rock and roll
- Occupations: Singer; songwriter; musician
- Instruments: Vocals, guitar
- Years active: 1958–present

John Lockett Devlin MNZM (born 11 May 1938) is a New Zealand singer, songwriter, and musician known for his influential role in the country's early rock and roll scene. He has often been compared to Elvis Presley.

His cover of Lloyd Price's "Lawdy Miss Clawdy" in 1958 went to number one in the New Zealand charts with sales of more than 100,000, launching a long-term career. He spent much of his time in Australia from 1959 touring in support of The Everly Brothers and making appearances on Australian television shows such as Bandstand, Six O'Clock Rock and The Go!! Show. In 1964, he toured Australia and New Zealand as a support act for The Beatles.

== Early life ==
John Lockett Devlin was born on 11 May 1938, the son of a railway ganger stationed in the mid-North Island. He grew up in various towns, including in Wanganui or the nearby small town of Raetihi. The family soon shifted to nearby Ohakune and then Marton before eventually settling in Wanganui, where John spent his formative years. He received his secondary education at St Augustines College. He received a guitar for his eleventh birthday and alongside his parents and three brothers, they formed a group called the Devlin Family. The group performed country songs at Wanganui talent quests, playing songs from the Lever Hit Parade such as "Rock Around the Clock".

The Devlin Family had been performing regularly up until 1955, when the parents retired from the entertainment business. The four brothers, plus the odd friend or cousin, continued to perform as the River City Ramblers, playing country and western, skiffle, and later Bill Haley style rock 'n' roll. Throughout 1956, enthusiasm began to ebb, and one by one the brothers dropped out, and more frequently weekends would see Johnny performing as a soloist. By the end of the year, the River City Ramblers were no more. It was then that he heard "Heartbreak Hotel" and his life was changed forever.

Devlin participated in numerous amateur talent competitions and performed material by Elvis Presley. On weekends, he travelled to Palmerston North, where he sang Presley songs at talent contests held at a youth club organised by New Zealand rock and roll musician Johnny Tahu Cooper. Cooper recognised Devlin's potential, provided guidance on stage performance, and encouraged him to develop his act. He later suggested that Devlin could establish himself as an Elvis-inspired performer in New Zealand.

In February 1957, aged 18, Devlin won his first talent quest as a rock 'n' roll performer. Other talent quests followed. In Palmerston North, he met Dennis Tristram, a rock 'n' roll dancer, who tried to persuade Devlin to move to Auckland. Devlin was happy to stay where he was, but did run into Tristram again later, who persuaded Devlin to visit the Jive Centre, and sing with the resident band. Owner Dave Dunningham gave him an audition and agreed to let him do a set that night. Devlin's debut at the Jive Centre featured an all-Presley repertoire and, although there was a general buzz in the audience before he commenced, no-one was prepared for what was to follow. By the time he completed his set, girls were screaming and the crowd was in awe and disbelief. Dave Dunningham was impressed and offered him a regular spot. Back in Wanganui he thought it over and a month later, March 1958, he returned to Auckland.

Dave Dunningham became his manager and within a month he had made Johnny Devlin the talk of the town. With Auckland conquered, Dunningham realised that the quickest way to break Devlin nationally was with a record release, but all the record companies in the country disapproved.

== Career ==
Phil Warren, a part-time drummer, began working at Begg's Music Store in 1955, and later formed Prestige Records, primarily to distribute overseas releases from independent labels. Dunningham pressured Warren into recording Devlin, so they came to an agreement and selected a poor-selling Presley release, "Lawdy Miss Clawdy" for the debut single. It was recorded at the Jive Centre one Sunday afternoon in May 1958, using the Dixielanders as the backing group, and given the primitive circumstances of the session and surroundings, the quality was awful, but "Lawdy Miss Clawdy" launched Johnny Devlin as New Zealand's first superstar, when it was released in June 1958 on the Prestige label. Recorded at the same session was the flipside, "When My Blue Moon Turns to Gold Again". A romping sax break replaces the guitar on Presley's version.

Although the single achieved little airplay, and the broadcast panel thought it was not of sufficient quality, it was snapped up by Auckland's teens in an unprecedented frenzy. Once sales had topped the 2,000 mark, the radio stations could no longer ignore it, with the disc topping the Lever Hit Parade within a few weeks. By now, the Dixielanders were out of the picture and Devlin was working with the Bob Paris Combo as his back-up band.

Devlin was now in great demand, and by August, his record sales had passed the 10,000 mark. This prompted further recording. He entered Bruce Barton's Wellesley Street studio for his second recording session. Between August and October, Devlin recorded a dozen tracks, to be released as Phil Warren saw fit. The Bob Paris Combo were used as backing on all of these tracks. Warren was receiving little-known records from American artists for distribution by his record company, but selected a few to give to Devlin to record.

His second single was a cover of both sides of a Jimmy Lloyd record, "I Got a Rocket in My Pocket" / "You're Gone Baby". It received little airplay and sold only moderately well, but within two weeks Devlin's third single appeared. "Slipping Around" / "Straight Skirt" sold a lot better and without the Presley influence, it demonstrated that New Zealand could produce credible rock 'n' roll.

By November 1958, his three singles had sold 50,000 copies. Between November 1958 and May 1959, Prestige released eight further singles, plus three EPs and an album, amassing total sales in excess of 200,000.

Graham Dent was an employee of the Kerridge Organisation which operated a string of theatres and cinemas throughout the country. Dent had been responsible for making the movie Rock Around the Clock (1956) successful in the cinemas. He was promoted to manage a new cinema in the Auckland suburb of Point Chevalier. On Sunday afternoons, he ran concerts for the local youth club and talent quests. Recognising Devlin's potential, he organised a concert there. With its success he approached his boss, Robert Kerridge, about the possibility of using their theatre chain to promote a national tour. After some initial doubt, his boss agreed to a two-week tour with extensions if successful.

Dave Dunningham left the management to Warren, so Warren and Dent put together a schedule. Bob Paris and his band were not keen on going on the road, so a new backing band had to be put together. Dent asked multi-instrumentalist Claude Papesch if he could put a band together. Claude was a sixteen-year-old blind musician, who was a regular at the Point Chevalier youth club. Papesch recruited guitarist Peter Bazely, bassist Keith Graham and drummer Tony Hopkins. Together they became the Devils, one of New Zealand's first truly rock 'n' roll bands.

The tour began at Wellington on 21 November 1958. Over the next two weeks he performed for close to 20,000 ecstatic fans in Wellington, Palmerston North, Masterton, Napier, Gisborne and Tauranga. The press raved and chaos broke out at every performance. The shows exceeded expectations, with New Zealand having never seen anything remotely like it.

Back in Auckland, another two-week tour was being organised, but before setting out, Devlin was rushed back into the studio, where in one night he recorded sixteen more tracks. In late November, his fourth single, recorded earlier in the year, was released. It was "6.5 Hand Jive" / "Play Rough". In December, five more records were released, three singles and two EPs. The singles were "Wild One" / "The Watch", "Crazy Baby Crazy" / "My True Love", and "Bony Moronie" / "Leroy". The first EP was a freebie called "Hit Tunes" put out by Coca-Cola, who had been part-sponsoring his tour. It contained the tracks "Cast Iron Arm", "Nervous", "Say Yeah", "Matador Baby", "Believe Me" and "Rave On". The other EP was called "How Would Ya Be?" and contained "Straight Skirt", "How Would Ya Be", "Slipping Around" and "I'm Grateful".

By the end of 1958, Devlin had achieved success in the North Island, but was still relatively unknown in the South Island. A tour down there was going to be a challenge as there was a local youth in Christchurch who was also attracting attention. He was Max Merritt of Max Merritt & the Meteors. His fans were fiercely loyal and the bookings for the Christchurch show were light. Dent was going to cancel the show, but came up with an idea. He invited MP and Cabinet Minister Mabel Howard to a champagne party followed by the Devlin show, and after the pair would be driven off to meet up with Max Merritt. A pink convertible was used and of course the press were there, along with the usual mob of screaming fans. This publicity stunt worked and Devlin became well received on the island.

By February 1959, Johnny Devlin's record sales were exceptionally strong. A new single was released, "20 Flight Rock" / "Move It" and another EP called "Johnny Sings Ballads". Its tracks were "Love Me", "I'm Counting on You", "Susie Darling" and "When My Mother Prayed For Me". Devlin's original recording of "Lawdy Miss Clawdy" had sold steadily since its mid-1958 release. With sales in excess of 30,000 and orders for another 10,000 after his South Island tour, it was decided to re-record the song under better conditions. The new version was released in February 1959 and out sold the original version, two to one, with combined sales exceeding 100,000. "Susie Darling" was placed on the flipside of the new version.

In the next two months, two more singles and another EP were released. The first was "Nervous Wreck" / "Queen of the Hop" and the second a tribute to his backing band "Rock with the Devils" backed with "Devil's Rock", an instrumental by the Devils. The EP was just called "Johnny Devlin" and contained "High Heeled Shoes", "Hard to Get", "Big Green Car" and "Your Cheatin' Heart".

In March 1959, Devlin left on what was to be his final tour of the country. He took in the smaller centres that had not experienced the Devlin hysteria and madness. He received a similar reception wherever he went, but inside the show, things were starting to fall apart. There was internal bickering, and being mobbed and screamed at was no longer a novelty. The whole act of touring was becoming a bore. The only remaining highlight came when in Wellington, he met the touring evangelist Billy Graham and the Prime Minister Walter Nash. A picture of the three of them appeared in the following day's newspaper. A week later, having had enough of the goings-on, Kerridge ended the tour.

With his career in limbo, Devlin returned home to Wanganui to celebrate his 21st birthday. Meanwhile, Warren received a phone call from Sydney-based American promoter, Lee Gordon, who was in the process of organising an Australasian tour for The Everly Brothers. He wanted to know if Warren could handle the New Zealand leg. Warren agreed on the condition that Devlin be placed on the bill for the Australian concerts. They agreed and with no fuss, fanfare or farewell concert, Johnny Devlin and the Devils slipped out of New Zealand in the last week of May 1959. Although he was moderately successful in Australia, his reign as a social phenomenon was over. It had lasted a mere twelve months.

Another EP, also called "Johnny Devlin" was released, containing "Flat 13", "Queen of the Hop", "I Was Robbed" and "Patty". The last two Prestige singles also came out. They were "White Lightning" / "Doreen" and "I Was The One" / "Pointed Toe Shoes". Prestige also released an album called Johnny in 1959.

=== 1959 onwards ===
Devlin continued to record while in Australia. Between 1959 and 1981, while using at least 14 different record labels, he released a further 40 singles, ten EPs and three albums. With his new Australian manager John Collins he founded his own "Teen" label, for which he had three moderate hits: "Turn the Lights Out Johnny" (December 1959, written by Devlin), "Gigolo" (September 1960, Mitchell Torok) and "Got a Zac in the Back of Me Pocket" (November 1960, Nat Kipner). Music World released an album called 24 Original Golden Greats in 1980 that contained all of his New Zealand singles. In 1963 and 1964, he recorded "Stomp the Tumbarumba" (written by Devlin), "Blue Suede Shoes" and "Whole Lotta Shakin' Goin' On", the Bee Gees singing backup vocals on all three songs.

Devlin wrote several songs for other artists, notably "Good Looking Boy", a hit for Patsy Ann Noble in 1961, and "Surfside" (1963) for Digger Revell and the Denvermen. Devlin was also the latter group's manager. He wrote the official song for the 1974 Commonwealth Games in Christchurch, "The Games are On".

Festival Records released two CDs with an overview of Devlin's recordings. The first released in 1998 covered his Australian years, the second, released in 2001, a compilation of his New Zealand Prestige years.

In June 2015, aged 77, Devlin suffered a heart attack while on board a P&O cruise ship. He was transferred to St Vincent's Hospital, Sydney in a critical condition and received a triple bypass which saved his life.

Devlin still continues to perform at the club level in Australia.

Of the original Devils, only Claude Papesch remained in the music business. Widely traveled around Australasia, he eventually settled in New South Wales, working more in the jazz field than the rock 'n' roll which launched him. Battling cancer during the last years of his life, he served time on the Blue Mountains City Council and was elected Deputy Mayor of Blue Mountains in 1984 but, due to ill health, was unable to complete his term. Claude Papesch died in February 1987, aged 45. Keith Graham went on to play with the Embers.

== Awards ==
=== Aotearoa Music Awards ===
The Aotearoa Music Awards (previously known as New Zealand Music Awards (NZMA)) are an annual awards night celebrating excellence in New Zealand music and have been presented annually since 1965.

Year	Nominee / work	Award	Result	Ref.
2007	Johnny Devlin	New Zealand Music Hall of Fame	inductee	

== Awards and recognition ==
- In the 2008 New Year Honours, Devlin was appointed a Member of the New Zealand Order of Merit for services to entertainment.
- In 2009, Devlin was presented with New Zealand's "Biggest One Hit Wonder of the Century Award", just edging out Ray Columbus with his "She's a Mod".
- In October 2015, he was presented the Benny Award from the Variety Artists Club of New Zealand, the highest honour available for a New Zealand variety entertainer.
