= Don't Let It Get You =

- Directed by: John O'Shea
- Produced by: John O'Shea
- Cinematography: Tony Williams
- Edited by: John O'Shea
- Music by: Patrick Flynn
- Release date: 1966
- Running time: 80 minutes
- Countries: Australia; New Zealand
- Language: English

Don't Let It Get You is a film made in New Zealand and Sydney, Australia in 1966. It is notable for the period it was made in as well as the popular musical acts that featured in it.

Sir Howard Morrison, Eddie Low, Dame Kiri Te Kanawa and Herma and Eliza Keil of the Keil Isles featured in the film. It also had an appearance by Australian hit maker Normie Rowe.

Directed by John O'Shea and written by Joseph Musaphia, the film captures the exuberance and energy of one of New Zealand's finest hours in pop/rock musical history. Fashioned in the style of Richard Lester's A Hard Day's Night (1964) and Help! (1965), it is a showcase for the talents of the period, including Kiri te Kanawa ("Sing for us now, Kiri"). The songs are mostly written by Patrick Flynn in collaboration with either O'Shea or Musaphia. However, the film is also a knockabout romantic comedy: the dialogue non-sequiturs, pratfall gags and bizarre juxtapositions display an offbeat sense of irony and blase manner not unlike that of television in the late Eighties (Terry and the Gunrunners and The Billy T. James Show, for example). As a nostalgia piece, the film comes as close to capturing the hopes and aspirations of the period as the Weekly Reviews do for the Forties and the Tangata Whenua series does for the Seventies.

== Synopsis ==
Although most of the film is set in Rotorua, it actually starts out in Sydney. The hero and heroine, Gary Wallace and Judy Beech, are both Australian. Gary wants desperately to play in Howard Morrison's band at a big concert in Rotorua, so he sells his drums to pay for the plane ticket to New Zealand, and Morrison turns out to be on the same flight. Judy, a Marilyn Monroe-type blonde, is also on that flight, en route to Rotorua with her mother for a holiday. The fourth major role is filled out by the obligatory villain, William, a rival drummer who has the job Gary seeks, and who also sets off in hot pursuit of Judy. At the end of the film, while Gary wins Judy and plays in the concert, William is quite literally marooned in the middle of Lake Rotorua.

== Cast ==
In order of credits

Actor	Played as
Howard Morrison	Himself
Gary Wallace	Himself
Carmen Duncan	Judith Beech
Normie Rowe	Himself
Kiri Te Kanawa	Herself
Harry Lavington	William Broadhead
Alma Woods	Mrs Beech
Tanya Binning	Queen of the Surf
Ernie Leonard	Himself
Eric Wood	Service Station Attendant
Anne Sharland	Herself
Rim D. Paul	Himself
Gerry Merito	Himself
Herma Keil	Himself
Eliza Keil	Herself
Lew Pryme	Himself
Eddie Low	Himself
Gwynn Owen	Herself
Keri Summers	Herself
Paul Walden	Himself
