= Eldred Stebbing =

- Born: Eldred Claude Stebbing; 3 October 1921
- Died: 6 December 2009 (aged 88)
- Occupation: Record executive
- Label: Zodiac Records

Eldred Claude Stebbing MNZM (3 October 1921 – 6 December 2009) was a New Zealand record label owner and co-founder of the Zodiac Records label. He also founded Stebbing Studios in Auckland.

== Biography ==
Stebbing was born in 1921. After leaving school in the 1930s, he was working on a production line for a company manufacturing radios. Later in the 1930s, along with his brother Phil, via their company, he supplied sound equipment for events. During World War II he was also involved in running dances attended by visiting servicemen. After the war, Stebbing Record and Sound Company Ltd was founded, and the company manufactured 78 rpm records. In 1960, he founded Zodiac Records. He built the Stebbing Recording Centre in 1970, which became known as Stebbing Studios.

In the 2004 Queen's Birthday Honours, Stebbing was appointed a Member of the New Zealand Order of Merit, for services to the recording and entertainment industries.

He was presented the Benny Award from the Variety Artists Club of New Zealand Inc in 2004 in recognition of his contribution to New Zealand entertainment.

Stebbing died on 6 December 2009, aged 88, and his ashes were buried at Purewa Cemetery, Auckland.
