= Waves (Waves album) =

Studio album by Waves
- Released: October 1975
- Recorded: Stebbing Studios, Auckland, 7–11 July 1975
- Genres: Folk rock, progressive folk
- Length: 38:11
- Label: Direction Records
- Producer: Peter Dawkins

Waves was the debut album by New Zealand folk-rock band Waves. It was released in 1975 and reached No.7 on the New Zealand album charts. The album, which became a sought-after collector's item on vinyl, was re-released in 2013 on vinyl and CD with a bonus disc, Misfit, a previously unreleased album recorded by the band in 1976.

Three singles were taken from the album—"The Dolphin Song"/"Letters", "Arrow"/Clock House Shuffle" and "At the Beach"/Waitress".

== Background ==
In 1975 Roger Jarrett, the editor of Auckland music magazine Hot Licks, introduced the band to Kerry Thomas and Guy Morris, co-owners of Direction Records, a chain of stores and a burgeoning independent record label. On 7 July 1975 the band began a five-day recording session for their debut album at Stebbing Studios in Jervois Rd, Ponsonby, across the road from the eight-bedroom colonial villa where Waves members lived.

Thomas arranged expatriate New Zealand producer Peter Dawkins, then living in Sydney, to return to Auckland to produce the album. Gash said: "Dawkins had five days, and he marshalled us through the procedures in a most efficient fashion. That was his job, and he did it well. He was tough though: one of our friends wasn’t cutting it quickly enough with his solo, and Peter made me go into the studio and fire him on the spot ... We freely availed ourselves of notable contributors. Some—Mike Chunn, Mike Caen, Roy Mason—were personal friends; others—Vic Williams, Murray Grindlay, Mike Harvey, Paul Lee—were introduced to us in the studio." He told The New Zealand Herald: "We were in a world we had dreamed of being in. It was a mix of excitement and terror."

At the end of the week, Dawkins flew back to Sydney with the finished tapes to mix them. "No doubt, in his world this was standard procedure," Gash said. "However what it did was disengage us from the process. When the mixes came back to Auckland, we didn’t understand them. They were not the way we heard ourselves. We voiced our desire to remix the album. Almost miraculously, Kerry Thomas agreed, and gained my gratitude forever. We kept Peter’s mixes of "Waterlady Song" and "Arrow"; the rest the band remixed at Stebbings with (engineer) Phil Yule, and that is what appeared on the album."

The band recorded a second album in 1976 for WEA Records, on which they began to explore a new direction with electric guitars. With recording almost complete, they were told that a WEA executive did not like the result and had ordered the multi-track tapes to be recorded over.

== 2013 re-release ==
In early 2013 the band was contacted by Roger Marbeck of Ode Records and music enthusiast and archivist Grant Gillanders to reissue the 1975 Waves album—by then a collector's item fetching high prices—on CD and vinyl for Record Store Day in April, with the release launched by a live performance at the Real Groovy record store in Auckland. Informed for the first time of the existence of a second album, albeit in a rudimentary form, Marbeck decided to release them both as a double CD. Only then was it discovered the original master tapes for the Waves album had vanished with the collapse in the 1970s of Direction Records.

"With the Waves album, we have never been able to find any tapes, so it came down to the small number of unplayed vinyls I had stashed away under the bed for the last 38 years," Gash said. "They were old, but mint, and I took them to Stebbings, where we ran them on a very high-end turntable and transferred it all to digital files. It worked superbly. We then mastered it there for vinyl with Steve McGough, pulling in the original engineer, Phil Yule, to listen as well. I then redid all the cover art and designed a new insert for photos and info, Kevin did a take on the original Direction label, and we sent it all off for cutting, pressing and packaging to United Record Pressing in Nashville." He said: "It actually sounds good, if not better, than the original."

For the previously unreleased 1976 album, McGough also took the single tape that existed of the unmixed recordings and transferred it to digital, while Marbeck succeeded in locating the multi-track tapes of "Vegas", the final song Waves recorded, in July 1977. Gash said: "They are the only multi-tracks we have of any of our material, and therefore the only song we had the opportunity to do an actual mix on." The result was the Waves album, remastered for both vinyl and CD, plus a bonus disc, Misfit, containing nine of the original 12 songs of the previously unheard second album. Five hundred copies of the vinyl album were pressed and 1000 copies of the double CD package. The band played at Real Groovy and signed copies of the new releases.

== Track listing ==
=== Side one ===
1. "Clock House Shuffle" (David Marshall) – 2:29
2. "Wornout Rocker" (Graeme Gash) – 4:29
3. "Thoughts From Venus" (Marshall) – 2:29
4. "Waterlady Song" (Marshall) – 3:37
5. "Letters" (Gash) – 2:02
6. "The Dolphin Song" (Gash) – 3:58

=== Side two ===
1. "Arrow" (Kevin Wildman) – 2:54
2. "Ocean/Neon Song" (Marshall) – 3:05
3. "Elouise" (Gash) – 3:48
4. "At the Beach" (Gash) – 2:55
5. "Waitress" (Marshall) – 2:38
6. "Castle Gates" (Gash) — 3:47

=== 2013 Reissue ===
==== Disc one ====
1. "Clock House Shuffle" (David Marshall) – 2:30
2. "Wornout Rocker" (Graeme Gash) – 4:23
3. "Thoughts From Venus" (Marshall) – 2:26
4. "Waterlady Song" (Marshall) – 3:31
5. "Letters" (Gash) – 1:57
6. "The Dolphin Song" (Gash) – 3:55
7. "Arrow" (Kevin Wildman) – 2:54
8. "Ocean/Neon Song" (Marshall) – 2:56
9. "Elouise" (Gash) – 3:44
10. "At the Beach" (Gash) – 2:50
11. "Waitress" (Marshall) – 2:35
12. "Castle Gates" (Gash) — 3:48

==== Disc two ====
1. "Misfit" (Marshall) — 2:37
2. "The Way They Smile" (Gash) — 5:09
3. "Life Wrecks" (Marshall) — 1:37
4. "Mrs X" (Gash, Marshall) — 7:18
5. "Vegas" (Gash) — 3:42
6. "Head Full of Stars" — 3:45
7. "Cold Palisade" (Marshall) — 3:32
8. "Schooners" (Gash) — 5:36
9. "Jacob and El Tornado" (Marshall) — 7:14

== Personnel ==
- Graeme Gash – guitar
- David Marshall – guitar
- Kevin Wildman — guitar
- Michael Matthew — bass guitar

=== Additional musicians ===
- Roy Mason – flutes ("Thoughts From Venus"), bass clarinet ("Letters"), recorders ("The Dolphin Song")
- Vic Williams — drums, pervussion
- Mike Harvey — piano ("Wornout Rocker")
- Mike Chunn — bass ("Clock House Shuffle")
- Murray Grindlay — mouth harp ("Castle Gates")
- Paul Lee — sax solo ("Waitress")
- Mike Caen — electric lead guitar ("Arrow")
- Kerry Thomas — percussion ("Waitress")

Technical personnel

- Phil Yule — recording engineer
