= Barry Coburn =

New Zealand music publisher

- Born: Dunedin, New Zealand
- Occupations: Music publisher, artist manager, concert promoter, record company executive
- Organization: Ten Ten Music Group

Barry Coburn is a New Zealand-born music publisher, artist manager, concert promoter and record company executive. In the early 1970s, he promoted concerts in New Zealand with Robert Raymond and co-promoted the 1973 Great Ngaruawahia Music Festival.

He later managed Split Enz and released the band's 1975 debut album, Mental Notes, in New Zealand on his White Cloud label. After moving to Nashville, Tennessee, Coburn co-founded Ten Ten Music Group, managed Alan Jackson, and served as president and chief executive officer of Atlantic Records Nashville.

== Early career in New Zealand ==
Coburn was born in Dunedin, New Zealand, and raised in Christchurch. He entered the music business in 1967, working for Manufacturers Distribution Company in Christchurch, where he sold records to retailers and promoted records to radio stations around the South Island. He later worked in A&R and production for Viking Records, where he was given an imprint called Viking Ventura.

Coburn left Viking in 1970 and moved into artist management, music publishing and concert promotion. He also worked as a tour manager for Australian promoter Harry M. Miller before partnering with Australian promoter Robert Raymond.

== Concert promotion and Split Enz ==
Coburn and Raymond promoted concerts by international acts in New Zealand in the early 1970s, including shows by Elton John and Led Zeppelin at Western Springs Stadium in Auckland. Their joint projects included the Great Ngaruawahia Music Festival, held from 6 to 8 January 1973. The festival was New Zealand's first attempt at a Woodstock-style festival and a key event in New Zealand rock history, with overseas acts such as Black Sabbath, Fairport Convention and Sandy Denny, along with New Zealand performers including BLERTA, Mammal, Billy TK and Powerhouse, and Split Enz.

After his partnership with Raymond ended, Coburn founded White Cloud Records. The label released records by Beech, Brent Parlane, Rockinghorse and Split Enz. Coburn had seen Split Enz, then known as Split Ends, at an early Auckland performance and became the band's manager. He managed the band from December 1972 to December 1975.

White Cloud released early Split Enz singles and the band's debut album, Mental Notes, in New Zealand in 1975. Mental Notes was White Cloud's only album release.

== Nashville and Ten Ten Music Group ==
Coburn moved to Nashville, Tennessee, in 1984 after working in concert promotion and artist management in New Zealand and Australia. In Nashville, he and Jewel Coburn started Ten Ten Music and Ten Ten Management. Coburn was a founder and co-president of Ten Ten Music Group, a music publishing company whose catalog represented hundreds of recorded singles and album tracks.

Ten Ten worked with Keith Urban as a publishing client during Urban's early Nashville period. In 1988, Coburn became manager of Alan Jackson. Coburn was Jackson's publisher-manager when Jackson signed with Arista Nashville in June 1989.

In 2014, Nettwerk Music Group's publishing division acquired a 50 percent interest in Ten Ten Music and formed a publishing joint venture with the company.

== Atlantic Records Nashville and industry roles ==
In 1999, Coburn became president and chief executive officer of Atlantic Records Nashville. He left the post in 2001 after the AOL Time Warner merger led to consolidation of the company's Nashville labels.

Coburn has served on music industry boards. In 2012, he and Zach Horowitz were appointed to the board of directors of the National Music Publishers' Association. Coburn has also served on the American Society of Composers, Authors and Publishers board.
