= Johnny Tahu Cooper =

New Zealand rock and roll musician and entrepreneur

Johnny Cooper

Background information
- Also known as: The Maori Cowboy
- Born: Tahu Cooper; 23 July 1929; Hawke's Bay, New Zealand
- Died: 3 September 2014 (aged 85) Naenae, New Zealand
- Genres: Country, rock and roll
- Occupation: Musician
- Instruments: Vocals, guitar
- Years active: 1950–1968
- Label: His Master's Voice

Johnny Tahu Cooper (23 July 1929 – 3 September 2014) was a New Zealand entertainer and performed both in the country and rock and roll genres. He had the distinction of recording the first rock and roll song in New Zealand.

== Background ==
He was also known as The Maori Cowboy, was a pioneering New Zealand rock and roll musician and entrepreneur. His cover of "Rock Around the Clock", a song popularised by Bill Haley & His Comets, is considered to be the first rock and roll song recorded in New Zealand. His 1955 single, "Pie Cart Rock 'n' Roll", was the first original rock song recorded and released in New Zealand. His song, "Look What You've Done", was covered by Johnny Devlin and became a national favourite, appearing in the 1994 film Once Were Warriors.

== Death ==
Cooper died at his home in Naenae on 3 September 2014 at age 85.
