= Ray Columbus =

Ray Columbus OBE
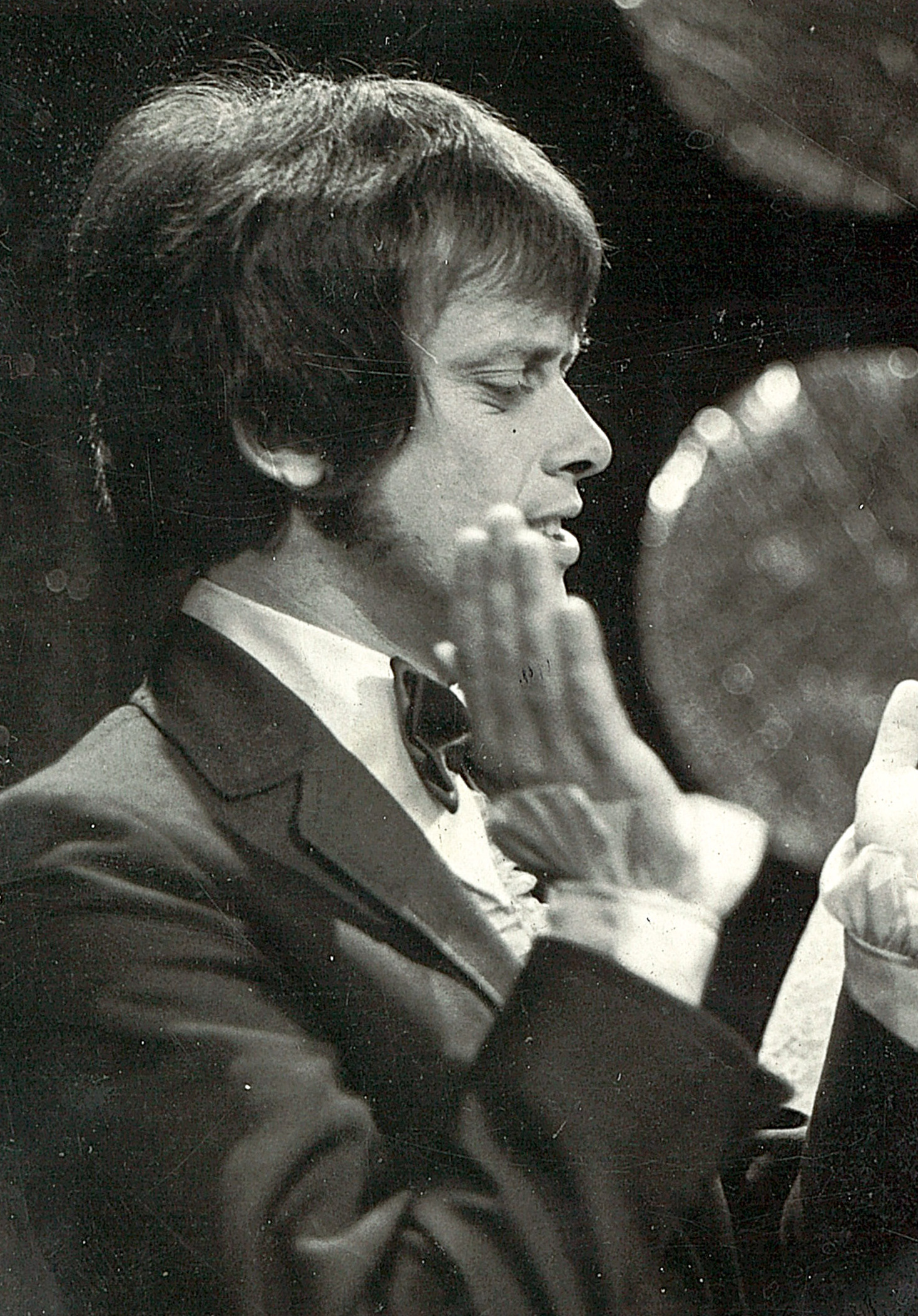
- Columbus on television in the early 1970s

Background information
- Born: 4 November 1942; Christchurch, New Zealand
- Origin: New Zealand
- Died: 29 November 2016 (aged 74) Snells Beach, New Zealand
- Genres: Pop music, surf music
- Occupations: Singer; songwriter; television host; music manager
- Instrument: Vocals
- Years active: 1959–2015
- Label: Zodiac
- Formerly of: Ray Columbus & The Invaders

Raymond John Patrick Columbus OBE (4 November 1942 – 29 November 2016) was a New Zealand Benny Award-winning singer and songwriter, television host, music manager and entertainer, with a career spanning six decades. As a lead singer for the band Ray Columbus & the Invaders, his best-known hit was "She's A Mod" in 1964.

== Early years ==
Columbus attended Xavier College in Christchurch and studied tap, but was more interested in the rock and roll of the era and formed his first band, The Dominoes, in 1959.

== Music career ==
Columbus got his big break playing with the Downbeats Band, which later became Ray and the Drifters. He relocated to Auckland when he was offered a TV show titled Club Columbus, whereupon he changed the band's name to Ray Columbus & the Invaders in 1964. The Invaders were known for their Fender guitars, dance moves and lavish clean-cut outfits. In 1964, the Invaders released their best-known song, "She's a Mod". The track was written by British musician Terry Beale for his group The Senators, but was not a hit. However, "She's A Mod" became a number one hit in Australia – the first song from a New Zealand group to reach the top of the charts in another country. In 1965, the band released the single "Till We Kissed", which sold fifty thousand units. It was a retitled version of "Where Have You Been (All My Life)", originally recorded by Arthur Alexander in 1962, and also performed by The Beatles during their Hamburg days.

The Invaders' second album, Original Numbers, was the first album in New Zealand to include entirely self-composed songs.

After disbanding the Invaders, Columbus relocated to the United States for two years. Returning to New Zealand, he hosted numerous television pop shows, including Ray Columbus presents New Faces, C'mon, Happen Inn and That's Country (which he co-created and helped sell to a US cable network). He was also a noted music manager, mentoring artists such as singer Suzanne Lynch. In the late 1990s, he managed the rock band Zed.

As a solo artist, Columbus performed at Redwood 70, the first major modern music festival held in New Zealand, toured with The Rolling Stones, Roy Orbison and The Newbeats, as well as playing Royal Variety Performances and being an opening act of the 1974 New Zealand Commonwealth Games.

== Personal life ==
Columbus released a biography in 2011, which stated that he had smoked for years and was a heavy drinker. He suffered a heart attack in 2004, and a stroke in 2007 that left him partially paralysed. In April 2014, he was reported to be terminally ill, from an immune deficiency condition caused by medication.

Columbus died at his Snells Beach, North Auckland, residence on 29 November 2016, at the age of 74, after a "four-year battle with ill health". He was survived by his wife and two children.

== Discography ==
=== Solo studio albums ===
Title	Details
The Ray Columbus Album	Released: August 1966; Label: Impact (IMP 103); Format: LP
Hit Tracks	Released: 1969; Label: Polydor (621006); Format: LP
Jangles, Spangles & Banners	Released: 1972; Label: Family (FLY 206); Format: LP
Happy Birthday Rock 'n' Roll (with The Stargazers)	Released: 1976; Label: RCA Victor (VPLI-0131); Format: LP

=== Compilation albums ===
Title	Details
His 14 Greatest Hits	Released: 1974; Label: Family (MFLY 220); Format: LP, Cassette
The Solo Years	Released: 2004; Label: EMI (5712812); Format: CD
Now You Shake	Released: 2016; Label: RPM Records (RETRO 976); Format: CD

=== Singles ===
List of singles with selected New Zealand positions
Title	Year	Peak chart positions	Album
Title	Year	NZ	Album
"We Want a Beat"	1966	—	The Ray Columbus Album
"I Need You"	1967	12	The Ray Columbus Album
"There's No Room in the 'In' Crowd"	1967	—	The Ray Columbus Album
"(That's What I've Got) For Loving You Baby"	1968	—	The Ray Columbus Album
"Travelling Singing Man"	1969	—	non-album singles
"Happy in a Sad Kind of Way"	1969	12	non-album singles
"Los Angeles (Is Where I Want to Stay)"	1970	—	Hit Tracks
"Hold Me"	1970	—	Hit Tracks
"Wendy, Where Are You?"	1970	—	non-album singles
"People Are People"	1971	—	non-album singles
"Good Friend of Mary's"	1971	—	non-album singles
"Where Is the "Y" In Love?"	1971	—	Jangles, Spangles & Banners
"Tell Me You Do" (with Jillian Richards)	1972	—	Jangles, Spangles & Banners
"Missing You"	1973	—	Jangles, Spangles & Banners
"Computer Dater"	1973	—	Ray Columbus His 14 Greatest Hits
"Singing the Blues"	1973	—	Ray Columbus His 14 Greatest Hits
"Bird Dog" (with The Stargazers)	1976	—	Happy Birthday Rock 'n' Roll
"She's a Mod" / "Mod Rap" (with Double J & Twice The T)	1989	2	non-album single
"Till We Kissed" (with Herbs)	1993	26	non-album single

== Honours and awards ==
In 1973, Columbus received the Benny Award from the Variety Artists Club of New Zealand Inc, the highest honour available to a New Zealand variety entertainer. In the 1974 Queen's Birthday Honours, he was appointed an Officer of the Order of the British Empire, for services to entertainment. In 1990, Columbus received the New Zealand 1990 Commemoration Medal for his promotion of New Zealand overseas.

=== Aotearoa Music Awards ===
The Aotearoa Music Awards (previously known as New Zealand Music Awards (NZMA)) are an annual awards night celebrating excellence in New Zealand music and have been presented annually since 1965.

Year	Nominee / work	Award	Result	Ref.
1965	"Till We Kissed"	Single of the Year	Won	
1966	"I Need You"	Single of the Year	Nominated	
1968	"Happy in a Sad Kind of Way"	Single of the Year	Nominated	
1970	"Travelling Singing Man"	Single of the Year	Nominated	
1971	"People Are People"	Single of the Year	Nominated	
1989	"She's a Mod" (with Double J and Twice the T)	Single of the Year	Nominated	
2009	Ray Columbus (as part of Ray Columbus & the Invaders)	New Zealand Music Hall of Fame	inductee	
