= Ray Columbus & the Invaders =

New Zealand rock band

- Origin: Christchurch, New Zealand
- Genre: Garage rock
- Years active: 1964–1966
- Label: Zodiac
- Past members: Ray Columbus; Dave Russell (guitar); Wally Scott (guitar); Peter Ward (drums); Puni Solomon (bass guitar); Billy Kristian (bass guitar); Jimmy Hill (drums)

Ray Columbus & the Invaders were a New Zealand rock group from Christchurch that was active for two years from 1964 to 1966. It was fronted by the lead vocalist, Ray Columbus. Part of the new surf music craze, they were the first New Zealand band to have a number 1 in another country, Australia, with their cover of The Senators' song "She's a Mod".

== History ==
Influenced by the early 1960s work of Cliff Richard and The Beatles, Ray Columbus & the Invaders had a #1 hit in Australia and New Zealand with "She's a Mod" in 1964, a cover version of a song by The Senators. Ray Columbus and the Invaders were included in a package tour "Big Beat '65" with Roy Orbison, The Rolling Stones and The Newbeats that toured New Zealand and Australia. During the tour, the Invaders performed as Orbison's backing band as well as performing as Ray Columbus and the Invaders.

They had several more hits in New Zealand before disbanding in late 1965. Leader Ray Columbus later moved to the US where he founded a California psychedelic band, Newcastle Five, which he renamed as The Art Collection. As a band, Ray Columbus and The Art Collection released four singles for the Colstar label, including the psychedelic rocker "Kick Me", before The Art Collection split with Columbus. During his time in California (1966–68), Columbus was offered an audition with The Monkees but turned it down. He also turned down the chance to play with David Crosby or Gene Clark after these musicians left The Byrds. Columbus went on to become a band manager.

Wally Scott, one of the guitarists for the band, died of cancer in January 1980 in his 30s.

Billy Kristian played bass guitar for the Invaders; he later joined the Keil Isles, The Jimmy Sloggett Band, Headband and Night and produced Herbs' first full album Long Ago.

Jimmy Hill, the drummer for the band, died on 7 November 2000 of a heart ailment at the age of 56.

The band were inducted into the New Zealand Music Hall of Fame in 2009.

Columbus died in November 2016 after four years of ill health.

== Discography ==
=== Albums ===
Title	Details
Every Nite	Released: 1964; Label: Zodiac (ZLP1020); Format: LP
Original Numbers	Released: 1966; Label: Zodiac (ZLP1025); Format: LP

=== Compilation albums ===
Title	Details
Till We Kissed (The Greatest Hits of)	Released: 1966; Label: Zodiac (ZLP1028) / Philips (BL08765); Format: LP
Anthology	Released: 1981; Label: Epic, CBS (ELPS4213); Format: LP
Greatest Numbers	Released: 2000; Label: Ascension Records (ANCD028); Format: CD
The Definitive Collection	Released: 2009; Label: Zodiac (ZCD4009); Format: 2×CD

=== Extended plays ===
Title	Details
Now You Shake	Released: 1965; Label: Zodiac (EPZ 130); Format: 7-inch EP
Till We Kissed	Released: 1981; Label: Epic (ES 631); Format: 7-inch EP

=== Singles ===
Year	Single	Chart positions	
Year	Single	AU	NZ
1963	"Ku-Pow"	-	-
1963	"Money Lover"	-	-
1963	"I Saw Her Standing There"	-	-
1964	"Cat's Eyes"	-	-
1964	"On My Mind"	-	-
1964	"She's a Mod"	1	3
1964	"Yo-Yo"	72	-
1965	"C'mon and Swim"	71	-
1965	"Till We Kissed"	29	26
1965	"All Through Pride"	-	-
1965	"The Cruel Sea"	-	-
1966	"We Want a Beat"	-	-
1981	"She's a Mod" (Reissue)	91	2

== Awards ==
=== Aotearoa Music Awards ===
The Aotearoa Music Awards (previously known as the New Zealand Music Awards (NZMA)) are an annual awards night celebrating excellence in New Zealand music and have been presented annually since 1965.

Year	Nominee / work	Award	Result	Ref.
2009	Ray Columbus & the Invaders	New Zealand Music Hall of Fame	inductee	
