= Great Ngaruawahia Music Festival =

Outdoor music festival in New Zealand

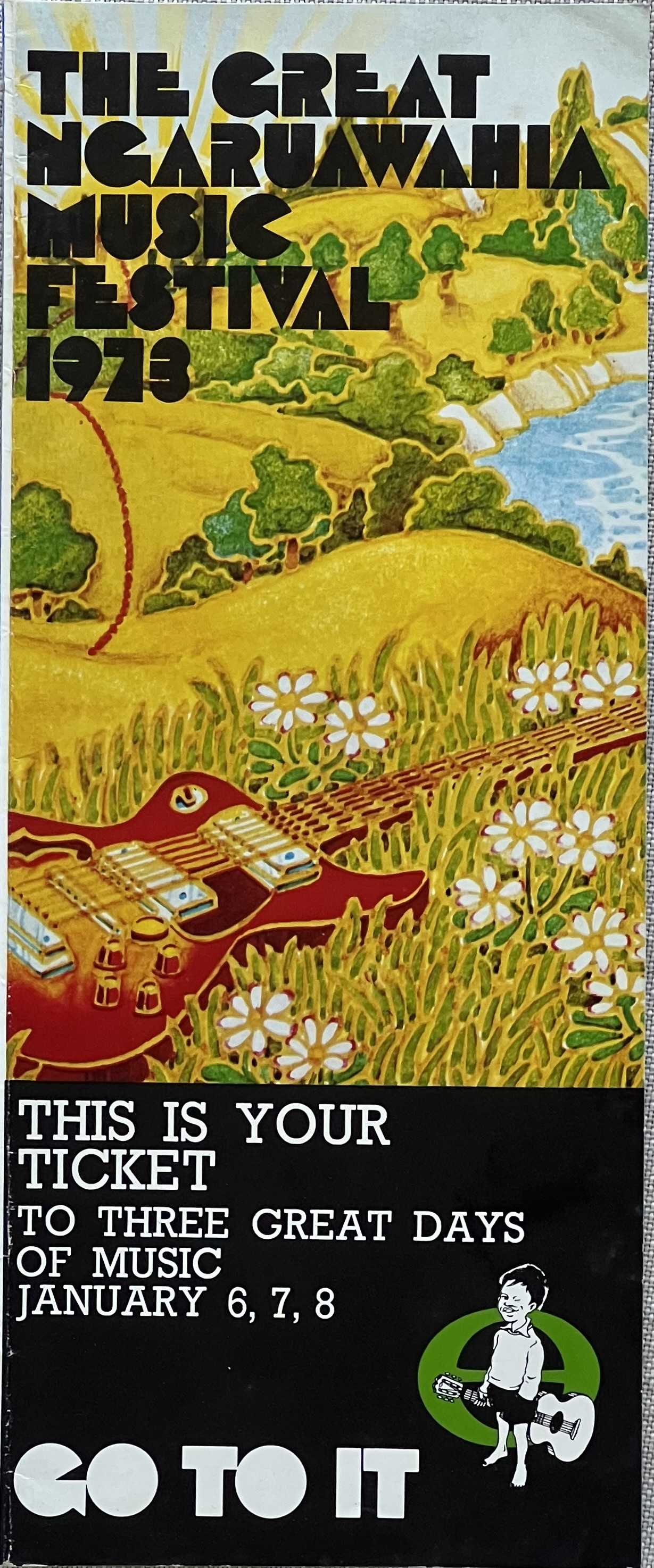
- Genre: Rock music, pop music
- Dates: 6–8 January 1973
- Locations: Ngāruawāhia on the Waikato River, New Zealand
- Coordinates: 37°40′S 175°9′E
- Years active: 1973
- Founders: Robert Raymond, Barry Coburn

The Great Ngaruawahia Music Festival was the first large outdoor music festival in New Zealand. It was held on a farm at Ngāruawāhia on the Waikato River, 19 kilometres north-west of Hamilton, for three days from 6 to 8 January 1973.

== Management ==
- Robert Raymond
- Barry Coburn

== Performers ==
- Corben Simpson (NZ) – opening act
- Black Sabbath (UK)
- Fairport Convention (UK)
- Blerta (NZ)
- Dragon (NZ)
- The La De Da's (NZ)
- Mammal (NZ)
- Max Merritt & The Meteors (NZ)
- Split Enz (then billed as "Split Ends") (NZ)
- Lindsay Marks (NZ)
- Bulldogs Allstar Goodtime Band (NZ)
- Billy TK's Powerhouse (NZ)
- Orb
- Butler (NZ)
- Ticket (NZ)
- Itambu (NZ)
- Treefoot (NZ)
- Teddy and the Bears (NZ)

== Publicity ==
- Corben Simpson removed all his clothes on stage and was reported nationwide in the media, Black Sabbath burned a cross on the hill while getting the entire audience to light a match or lighter.
- Ticket never appeared. They were scheduled to appear and to tour Australia and Canada with Black Sabbath but singer Trevor Tombleson had a throat infection and guitarist Eddie Hansen's 'beloved yellow rig' was blown up by Sabbath's guitarist who was using it onstage without permission. Hansen refused to go on after that.
- "Todd (Hunter) ... gathered some friends and fellow performers for an appearance at the Great Ngaruawahia Music Festival. They wrote original songs for their set list, and someone pulled the name "Dragon" out of an I Ching book. Their performance at the Ngaruawahia Music Festival led to a better gig, a few weeks performing at the Occidental Hotel in Auckland."

== See also ==
- List of historic rock festivals
- New Zealand music festivals
