= Freddie Keil =

- Origin: Western Samoa
- Died: 1994 Rarotonga, Cook Islands
- Genres: Pop,
- Occupation: Musician
- Instrument: Vocals
- Years active: 1956–?
- Labels: Viking Records, Zodiac Records, Armar Records

Freddie Keil was a musician most notable as a member of The Keil Isles in New Zealand in the 1950s and 1960s. The former dry cleaner was born in Western Samoa and was part German.

== Background ==
Keil, along with Mavis Rivers, the Yandall Sisters and the opera singers Daphne Collins and Iosefa Enari are Samoans who have made a major contribution to music in New Zealand.

== History ==
He migrated to New Zealand. In the 1950s he joined cousins Olaf, Rudolf, Klaus and Herma Keil and they became The Keil Isles which went on to become one of New Zealand's most successful groups of the 1950s and 1960s. After having a falling-out with his cousin Herma he left the band and formed his own group The Zodiacs who were to eventually change into Freddie Keil and the Kavaliers.

After releasing 11 singles on the Zodiac Records label and an LP up to 1965 they broke up.

Freddie Keil recorded some singles under his own name as well. Later Freddie Keil moved to Rarotonga in the Cook Islands, married a Cook Islander and had two daughters. Freddie also started the 'first' FM Radio Station in the South Pacific Area at Rarotonga and long before New Zealand had ever gone FM.

Keil died in 1994 in Rarotonga.

== Discography ==
=== Freddie Keil and the Kavaliers ===
- I Found A New Love / Three Nights A Week – Zodiac Z-1063 – (1961)
- What About Me / "Take Good Care of Her" – Zodiac Z-1079 (1962)
- The Wanderer / Twisting The Night Away – Zodiac Z-1085 – (1962
- Should I / Its Only A Paper Moon – Zodiac Z-1105 – (1963)
- All The Other Boys Are Talking / Take These Chains from My Heart – Zodiac Z-1109 – (1963)
- Don't Try To Fight It Baby / No Signs of Loneliness Here – Zodiac Z-1114 – (1963)
- Girls / Learnin', Trying To Forgive – Zodiac Z-1147- (1963)

=== The Freddie Keil Five ===
- Talk / Splish Splash – Zodiac Z-1187 (1964)

=== Freddie Keil ===
- The Twist / Tossin' And Turning Zodiac Z-1082 (1962) – (Note side 2 credited to The Kavaliers)
- I've Got My Eyes on You / Move On – Zodiac Z-1177- (1964)
- I Surrender Sweetheart / Tapiri Mai – Armar AR-1001
  Side 1 is Freddie Keil with Bill Sevesi and His Islanders, Side 2 is Lin Peyroux with Bill Sevesi and His Islanders
