= Olaf Keil =

New Zealand musician (1934–2022)

- Born: Olaf Tilo Keil; 24 April 1934; Apia, Western Samoa
- Died: 21 January 2022 (aged 87) Arlington, Texas, U.S.
- Genres: Pop, country music, rock & roll, polynesian music
- Occupations: Musician, custom guitar builder, banjo builder, band manager
- Instruments: Electric guitar, hawaiian steel guitar
- Years active: 1950s–
- Labels: Viking, Zodiac, Tanza, Collector Records

Olaf Tilo Keil (24 April 1934 – 21 January 2022) was a New Zealand musician who was the founder and lead guitarist of New Zealand rock and roll group The Keil Isles, playing on their pre-1963 recordings on the TANZA and Viking record labels. He was also a custom guitar and banjo builder for Fender. He is also the creator of the Keil Midi. For a period of time he also managed and took care of the booking for the Keil Isles.

== Biography ==
Keil was born in Apia, Western Samoa on 24 April 1934. When he was young, as early as ten years of age, he began making his ukuleles out of coconut shells. He had a keen interest in electronics, photography and woodworking. In 1951 when he was 17, he left in Western Samoa to go to Fiji for a six-month photography course. The next year he arrived in New Zealand.

He began his musical career by playing in his uncle's 14-piece band and would back his cousin Freddie Keil on rock and roll songs when asked to. He taught his younger brother to play guitar and in 1956 he and his younger brothers formed the Keil Isles. The Keil Isles would end up becoming very popular and Olaf and the rest of the group would tour New Zealand with Cliff Richard and The Shadows in 1961. Olaf Keil was considered to be a brilliant musician and he could replicate the guitar solos that were heard on overseas records. With his technical knowledge he was able to successfully design and build the first echo unit in New Zealand and attempting to copy that Elvis Presley instrumental sound that was heard on his records. This gave the Keil Isles an edge to compete with overseas acts from the UK and the US.

Keil left the group in 1962 to move to the United States.

== Work at Fender ==
After being convinced by singer Del Shannon, he decided to move to America. In spite of his band having signed a $28,000 guarantee with Philip Warren in 1962, he still managed to go to America. He worked for some time in a clothing company and then joined the Fender company in 1962. He began working in the wiring department and later on to the construction of guitar bodies and then guitar necks. He actually ended up working in every department. Fender ended up acquiring a banjo building business and Keil had the distinction of being its sole banjo builder, making five custom instruments every week.

In addition to custom-made banjos, he has also custom built guitars for artists as diverse as Johnny Cash, Glen Campbell, Jimi Hendrix and Buck Owens.

== Later life and death ==
Having learnt to play the Hawaiian steel guitar, he and other Fender musicians did a Polynesian act for a show in Las Vegas. He left the Fender company in 1973. Later with his family he was to form a Polynesian group that would work in New Orleans, Dallas and Pensacola. They were doing promotions for airline companies advertising flights to Hawaii as well.

In 1978 he moved to Central Florida and did a Polynesian act for Sea World. He later moved to Kissimmee and in April 1990 he opened Olaf Keil Woodworking Projects.

Keil died in Arlington, Texas on 21 January 2022, at the age of 87.
