= Franz von Keil =

Austrian naval officer

Franz Ritter von Keil
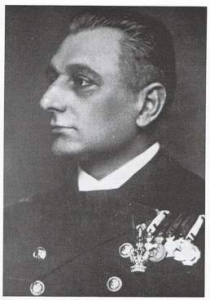
- Born: September 15, 1862
- Died: November 22, 1945
- Allegiance: Austria
- Branch: Navy
- Rank: Naval Officer
- Commands: Senior Naval Adviser to Emperor Charles I
- Battles / wars: World War I

Franz Ritter von Keil (September 15, 1862 – November 22, 1945) was an Austrian naval officer during World War I. He served as Emperor Charles I's senior naval adviser at the close of the war. The position was a sinecure, as the Emperor did not take advice and the navy did not take to sea.

Von Keil's parents were lieutenant field marshal Heinrich Ritter von Keil and Georgina Maria Brentano (1842–1867). He had one daughter, Herta von Keil Cima (1891–1971).
