= Herma Keil =

- Born: Herman Keil
- Origin: Western Samoa
- Genres: pop,
- Occupation: Musician
- Instrument: Vocals
- Years active: 1956–?
- Label: Viking Records

Herma Keil was a Samoan-born New Zealand-based rock and roll singer who found popularity in New Zealand in the 1960s.

== Background ==
Keil was born in Samoa. Along with brothers Olaf, Klaus, Rudolf and cousin Freddie Keil, Herma formed The Keil Isles in the 1950s which proved to be a popular hit making band. The band at one stage was billed as Herma Keil & The Keil Isles. He was their lead vocalist for six years from 1960 until 1966. He along with sister Eliza left the band to pursue solo careers. He released records under his own name as a solo artist and he and sister Eliza appeared in the musical comedy film Don't Let It Get To You.

Keil was also related to Samoan-born musician and Elvis impersonator, Alphonso Keil.

== Career ==
Working with producer Dave Dunningham, Keil on lead vocals recorded "The Twist". Backed with "Siboney" and credited to Herma Keil with the Keil Isles, the song was released on Viking VS.69 in late 1961. It was reported in the 10 March issue of Billboard Music Week that Keil's record had topped the 18,000 mark and was the biggest for him in spite of his long line of hits.

In 1963, Keil did a duet with Anne Murphy and recorded "We're Goin' Dancing". The producer was Des Gibson. The song was credited to Herma Keil and Anne Murphy with the Keil Isles. Backed with "Marie", it was released on Viking 121. It was reported in the 21 September issue of Billboard that Viking were following up on their success of Peter Posa's White Rabbit album with another one by the artist. They were also hoping to have success on the international market with Keil's "We're Going Dancing" which already had the attention of three overseas companies. All negotiations were being handled by Wolter Hoffer, an American spokesman.

== Later years ==
In later years Herma Keil moved to Australia and retired there.

== Discography ==
=== Albums ===
Title	Details
I Could Have Danced All Night (The Keil Isles featuring Herma Keil)	Released: 1962; Label: Viking (VP 84); Format: LP
Herma and The Keil Isles (as Herma and The Keil Isles)	Released: 1963; Label: Viking (VP 101); Format: LP
The Sound of Herma and The Keil Isles (as Herma and The Keil Isles)	Released: 1966; Label: Viking (VP 167); Format: LP
Keils-a-Go-Go! (as Herma and The Keil Isles)	Released: 1967; Label: Salem (XP.5028); Format: LP

== Awards and nominations ==
=== Aotearoa Music Awards ===
The Aotearoa Music Awards (previously known as New Zealand Music Awards (NZMA)) are an annual awards night celebrating excellence in New Zealand music and have been presented annually since 1965.

Year	Nominee / work	Award	Result	Ref.
1965	"Teardrops"	Single of the Year	Nominated	

== Film and television appearances ==
- Don't Let It Get To You
