= Zodiac Records =

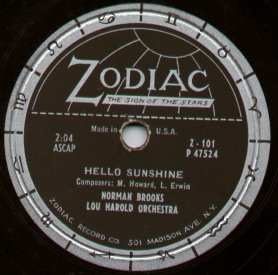
U.S. Zodiac label

Zodiac Records has been the name of at least six different record labels:

- Zodiac Records (New Zealand), an Auckland, New Zealand label of Stebbing Recording and Sound
- Zodiac Records, a New York City, United States company in the 1950s
- Zodiac Records, a Chicago-based company in the late 1960s, best known for their key artist Ruby Andrews and her trademark hit "Casanova (Your Playing Days Are Over)".
- Zodiac Records, a New York City, United States company founded in 1987 and revived in 2006
- Zodiac Records, a Netherlands label in the 1990s
- Zodiac Records, an Arogno, Switzerland company in the early 2000s
