= My Thanks to You =

Studio album by Connie Francis
- Released: August 1959
- Recorded: March 4, 5, and 6, 1959
- Genre: Pop
- Length: 39:25
- Label: MGM; E-3776 (mono)/SE-3776 (stereo)
- Producer: Arnold Maxin, Norman Newell

Connie Francis chronology
The Exciting Connie Francis (1959)	My Thanks to You (1959)	Connie Francis Sings Italian Favorites (1959)

My Thanks to You is a studio album recorded by American entertainer Connie Francis. The album features British songs which had been popular on both sides of the Atlantic between the 1920s and the 1940s. It was recorded from March 4–6, 1959, at EMI's famous Abbey Road Studios in London.

== Background ==
During the sessions, Francis recorded two versions of the song "I'll Close My Eyes", written by Billy Reid and Buddy Kaye. Both recordings share the same orchestral arrangement but different sets of lyrics, which are referred to as "American version" and "British version" for distinction. The British version was included on the album, while the American version remained unreleased until 1993.

Geoff Love and Tony Osborne, who both also appeared as conductors, provided arrangements in the style of British Light Music to make the album more appealing, especially to British audiences, who had rewarded Francis with two No. 1 chart hits. "Who's Sorry Now?" and "Stupid Cupid" had reached the top in 1958, making her even more successful on the European side of the Atlantic than in her native America, where both songs had peaked at No. 4 and No. 16 respectively.

However, even with sophisticated singles such as "My Happiness" (a US No. 2 and a UK No. 4 for her in early 1959), Francis was still considered too much of a rock 'n' roll singer to be also accepted as a performer of adult contemporary material; thus, the album failed to make an impression on the charts.

The album was re-packaged with a new cover design and re-released in March 1962.

== Track listing ==
=== Side A ===
#	Title	Songwriter	Length
1.	"My Thanks to You"	Noel Gay, Norman Newell	3.32
2.	"The Bells of St. Mary's"	A. Emmett Adams, Douglas Furber	2.30
3.	"A Garden in the Rain"	Carroll Gibbons, James Dyrenforth	3.08
4.	"Try a Little Tenderness"	Jimmy Campbell, Reg Connelly, Harry M. Woods	3.50
5.	"A Tree in the Meadow"	Billy Reid	3.27
6.	"Now Is the Hour"	Maewa Kaihau, Clement Scott, Dorothy Stewart	2.35

=== Side B ===
#	Title	Songwriter	Length
1.	"I'll Close My Eyes" (British Version)	Billy Reid, Buddy Kaye	3.36
2.	"The Very Thought of You"	Ray Noble	3.47
3.	"These Foolish Things (Remind Me of You)"	Eric Maschwitz, Jack Strachey	4.20
4.	"Cruising Down the River"	Nell Tollerton, Eily Bendell	2.24
5.	"The Gypsy"	Billy Reid	3.00
6.	"Goodnight, Sweetheart"	Ray Noble, Jimmy Campbell, Reg Connelly, Rudy Vallée	3.16

For the British release, "Cruising Down the River" was replaced with "Good Luck, Good Health, God Bless You" (Charles Adams [Harry Sugarman], A. LeRoyal [Charles Henry Forsythe]).

=== Unreleased songs from the sessions ===
#	Title	Songwriter	Length	Remark
1.	"I'll Close My Eyes" (American version)	Billy Reid, Buddy Kaye	3.38	unreleased until 1993
