= Waretini =

Studio album by Deane Waretini
- Released: 1981
- Studio: Mandrill Studios
- Genre: Pop
- Label: CBS

Deane Waretini chronology
Waretini (1981)	Now is the Hour (2012)

Singles from Waretini
- 1. "The Bridge" / "Luckenbach, Texas" Released: 1980; 2. "Growing Old" / "All Those Nights" Released: 1980; 3. "Ethos" / "Po Ata Rau" Released: 1981

Waretini is an album by Deane Waretini which features his hit single "The Bridge".

== Background ==
The Album was released by CBS in 1981. The single, "The Bridge" which is on track 1, side 1 of the album was the biggest New Zealand single of the year and the first for a song in Maori language to be at the top of the charts. It also charted in Australia. By July 26, 1981, the album was at no 13 in the New Zealand album charts.

== Track listing ==
No.	Title	Writer(s)	Length
1.	"The Bridge"	Nini Rosso, George Tait	3:30
2.	"The Wonder Of You"	Baker Knight	2:29
3.	"Ethos"	S. Myers / Tait	3:12
4.	"Growing Old"	Brian Holiday	4:15
5.	"Po Ata Rau"	Traditional	2:27
6.	"Little Darlin'"	Maurice Williams	1:52
7.	"Rags To Riches"	Richard Adler / Jerry Ross	1:59
8.	"Concern"	G. Last / Tait	2:51
9.	"All Those Nights"	S. O'Neill	2:35
10.	"Circumstances"	Julio Iglesias / G. Belfiore / M. Balducci / Arcusa / Tait	3:54
11.	"Luchenbach Texas"	Bobby Emmons / Chips Moman	3:00
12.	"Gentleness"	Banov, Cook / Tait	3:07

== Additional personnel ==
- Trumpet on "The Bridge" - Kevin Furey
- Background vocals - The Yandall Sisters
