= Now Is the Hour =

Now Is the Hour may refer to:

- Now Is the Hour (song), a popular early 20th century song
- Now Is the Hour (Charlie Haden album), 1995
- Now Is the Hour (Jennifer Rush album), 2010
- Now Is the Hour (Deane Waretini album), 2012
- Now Is the Hour (TV series), a 2012 New Zealand mockumentary television series
