= Bubbles Mihinui =

New Zealand tourist guide and community leader

Bubbles Mihinui DCNZM MBE JP
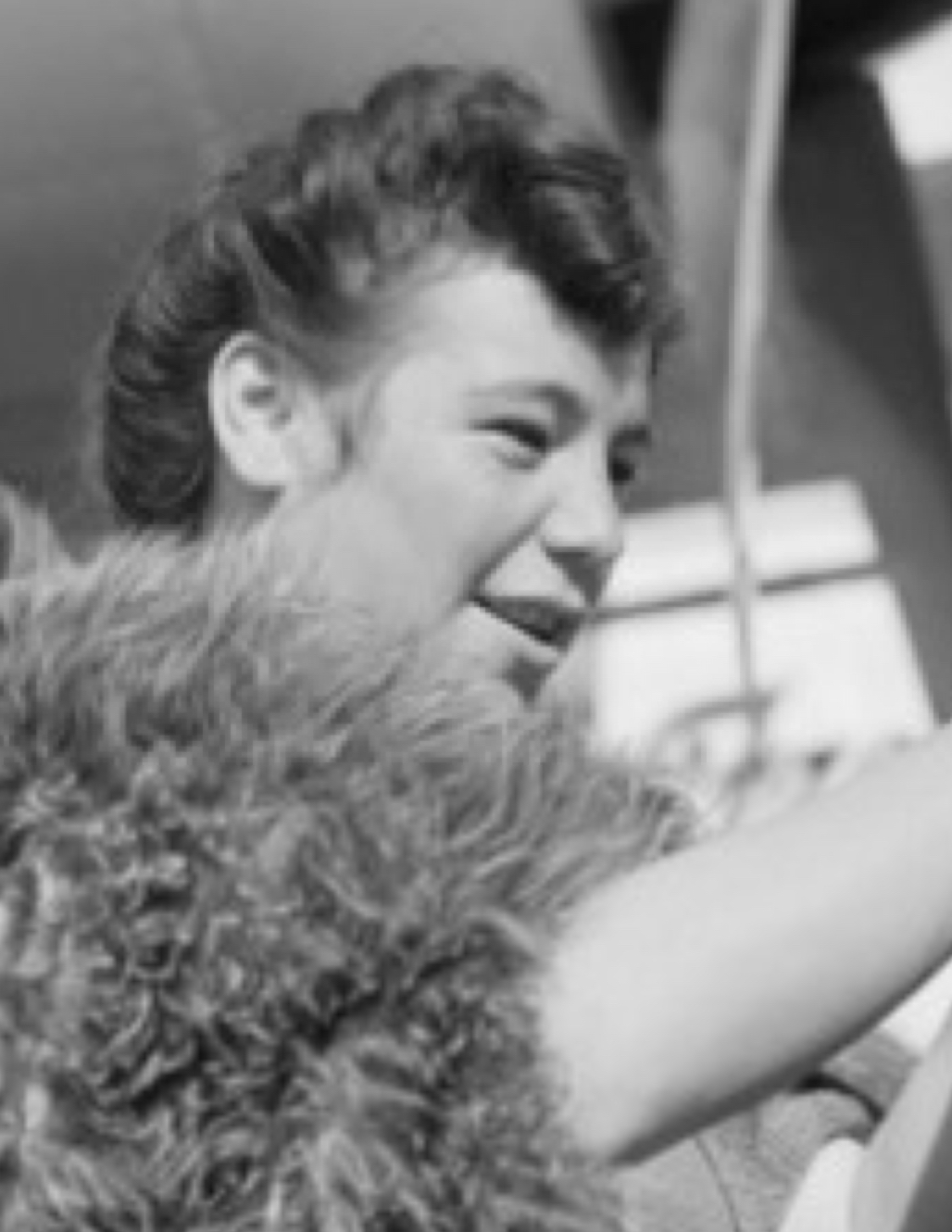
- Mihinui in 1947
- Born: Dorothy Huhana Sewell; 20 December 1919; Whakarewarewa, New Zealand
- Died: 26 June 2006 (aged 86); Rotorua, New Zealand
- Spouse: Ted Mihinui (died 1982)
- Children: 6
- Relatives: Deane Waretini Snr (uncle); Deane Waretini (cousin)

Dorothy Huhana "Bubbles" Mihinui (née Sewell; 20 December 1919 – 26 June 2006), also known as Guide Bubbles, was a New Zealand tourist guide and community leader. She became chief guide at Whakarewarewa in 1970, following the death of Guide Rangi.

== Early life and family ==
Mihinui was born Dorothy Huhana Sewell, at Whakarewarewa on 20 December 1919. Her mother, Watu Sewell (née Waretini) was a guide at Whakarewarewa and known as a singer, and was the sister of Deane Waretini Snr. Her father, Samuel Sewell, was Australian. She affiliated to the Tūhourangi iwi, part of the Te Arawa confederation.

With her brother, she was sent to live with her maternal grandparents, Ngapera and Waretini Eparaima, in Auckland when her mother fell ill and died aged 27. For short periods, she attended Point Chevalier Primary School, Poroporo Native School, and Whakarewarewa Native School, but much of her education was by the Māori oral tradition. When her grandfather, who worked for the Tourist Department in Auckland, retired in the 1930s, the family returned to lived in Rotorua.

She married Nikora Whakapu (Ted) Mihinui, and the couple had six children. Ted Mihinui died in 1982.

== Guide at Whakarewarewa ==
She was selected by Mita Taupopoki to be a guide at Whakarewarewa, and began as an apprentice guide in 1936. She was mentored by Guide Bella Papakura, and became a registered guide in 1938. Following Guide Rangi's death in 1970, Mihinui assumed the position of senior guide, and was responsible for the training of new guides at the New Zealand Māori Arts and Crafts Institute (NZMACI). She was appointed NZMACI's public relations officer in 1982, and retired in 1985.

== Other activities ==
In 1937, she was a founding member of the Māori Women's Health League, that eventually coalesced with other organisations to become the Māori Women's Welfare League in 1951. Other community organisations in which she was involved included the Red Cross and Zonta. An expert in Māori arts and culture, she maintained a long involvement in the training and judging of poi. In 1980, Mihinui was appointed a justice of the peace. She was also a marriage celebrant.

In 2000, Mihinui was part of a group that lodged a claim with the Waitangi Tribunal, alleging that the government had encouraged Māori to smoke and had failed to give early warning of the health dangers of smoking. The claim was ultimately unsuccessful.

== Death and legacy ==
Mihinui died at her home in Rotorua on 26 June 2006, and after her tangihanga at Te Pākira Marae she was buried at Kauae Cemetery, Ngongotahā. The prime minister, Helen Clark, paid tribute to Mihinui, saying:

"She was a towering figure in Te Arawa and a respected kuia. She made a huge contribution to tourism in the Rotorua area, in particular as a guide at Whakarewarewa."

== Honours and awards ==
In the 1985 New Year Honours, Mihinui was made a Member of the Order of the British Empire, for services to the tourist industry and the community. She was awarded the New Zealand Suffrage Centennial Medal in 1993. In the 2002 Queen's Birthday and Golden Jubilee Honours, she was appointed a Distinguished Companion of the New Zealand Order of Merit, for services to Māori, tourism and the community.

In 2001, Mihinui received the Sir Jack Newman Award, in recognition of her contribution to tourism in New Zealand. In 2004, she was one of five recipients of Ngā Tohu a Tā Kingi Ihaka (the Sir Kingi Ihaka Award), given to kaumātua (elders) who have dedicated their lives to the retention of Māori arts and culture.
