= The Mauri Hikitia =

Compilation album by Various
- Released: 1981
- Recorded: Mandrill Studios
- Genre: Pop
- Label: Epic ELPS 4192 (CBS)

Alternative cover

The Mauri Hikitia is a various artists album released in 1981. It reached no 4 on the New Zealand charts. It features Rhonda, Ken Kincaid, Deane Waretini, and the Lightwood family.

== Background ==
The album was represented by various Maori artists / musicians who came together to support the Mount Smart Stadium project. The term Mauri Hikitia comes from George Tait, a cultural organiser and composer. Tait wrote the words to The Bridge, which was a number 1 hit for Deane Waretini.

As a new arrival to the charts, it was no 7 by 24 May 1981. By 14 June, it was at no 4, and by 21 June it had dropped one to position 5.

=== Artists and production ===
It was recorded at Mandrill Recording Studios in Auckland.

Rhonda was a well known Maori entertainer and recording artist, who died in 2007. Ken Kincaid had a single "Easy" released on CBS BA 222834. The B side of the single, "Song For Home" a.k.a. "Now Is The Hour" is from this compilation. The following year, Kincaid had another CBS single which wasn't connected to the album. Deane Waretini had been around since the early 1970s, and prior to his hit with "The Bridge" in 1981, he had already had two singles released on the Tony McCarthy Recordings label. The first was in 1972, and the second the following year.

== The album ==
The Mauri HikitiaEpic ELPS 4192 (CBS)1981
Artist	Title	Composer	Time
The Lightwood Family	"You Are My Sunshine"	Davis, Mitchell	
Rhonda	"Pokarekare Ana"	P.H. Tomoana	
Ken Kincaid	Songs of home : "Now Is the Hour""	trad.; arr. Eddie Low	
Tri Lites	"Your love controls"	B. McCracken, A. Cunningham	
Tri Lites	"Cupid"	Cooke	
Tri Lites	"Let It Be Me"	Curtis, Delande, Becaud	
Rhonda	"Waiheke"	Waikiki, Cummings	
Lightwood Family	"Blue Moon"	Rogers, Hart	
Deane Waretini	"All Those Nights"	Sharon O'Neill	
Lightwood Family	"Let Me Be There"	Rostill	
Deane Waretini	"Growing Old	Brian Holiday	
