= I'll Close My Eyes (song) =

1945 popular song

"I'll Close My Eyes", first published in 1945, is a song written and composed by the English songwriter and bandleader Billy Reid. This song is usually performed with altered lyrics by the American songwriter Buddy Kaye. The song has become a jazz standard.

== Composition and recordings ==
The original version of the song had both music and lyrics written by Billy Reid. In this original version, the song is a song of regret, with a verse introducing the theme in words which include: "Love was mine, you gave me a chance; But my heart was not content and I lost my romance.." The main song refrain then begins (as it does in the later version) "I'll close my eyes" but continues "and make believe it's you". The song then continues on the theme that the singer has foolishly lost his love and can now only close his eyes and imagine her in his loneliness. It was recorded with the original Billy Reid words by the English singer Dorothy Squires, who had a close association with Billy Reid.

Soon after its release, new words were written for the Billy Reid tune by the American songwriter Buddy Kaye. The new words make the song more upbeat. The initial phrase of the song remains "I'll close my eyes" but now it continues "...to everyone but you". The song then continues on the theme that the singer will always be faithful, will "lock my heart to any other caress" and will close his eyes to see his love "through the years" in "those moments when we're apart". It thus becomes, not a song of loss, but a commitment to fidelity in a relationship which is expected to last. In this form, it was taken up by a number of singers. It was broadcast by Frances Langford with the new words as early as 1947, in a Maxwell House Radio Show.

== List of recordings ==
Performers who have recorded the song in vocal or instrumental versions include:

- Dorothy Squires (with Billy Reid's original words) - 1945
- Andy Russell - 1947
- Mildred Bailey - 1947
- Vic Damone - 1947
- Sarah Vaughan - 1957
- Dinah Washington - 1957
- Connie Francis. In 1959, Francis recorded both versions of the lyrics, with the same orchestral arrangement. The 1959 album released from this session was called My Thanks To You, and included only the original version of the lyrics; the recording with the later version of the lyrics was not released until 1993.
- Blue Mitchell - 1960
- Marilyn Michaels - 1965
- Joan Regan
- Dinah Shore
- Peggy Lee
- Cannonball Adderley and his orchestra
- Gene Ammons
- Ray Anthony
- Betty Scott
- Bob Montgomery
- Kenny Burrell
- Barrett Deems
- Joan Griffith
- Johnny Desmond
- Anita Ellis
- Percy Faith
- Keith Jarrett
- Ken McIntyre
- Peter Marshall
- Claire Martin
- Ken McIntyre
- Ted Heath
- Andreas Petterson
