= Now Is the Hour (Deane Waretini album) =

Now is the Hour

Studio album by Deane Waretini
- Released: 31 August 2012
- Label: Ode

Deane Waretini chronology
Waretini (1981)	Now is the Hour (2012)

Professional ratings
Review scores
Source	Rating
The New Zealand Herald	3.5/5 stars

Now is the Hour is an album by New Zealand singer Deane Waretini, best known for his 1981 hit single The Bridge. The album contains songs from the Bridge era as well as later recorded songs. Around the same time, Waretini also starred in a Scottie Douglas Productions television series of the same name.

== Critical reception and charts ==
The album received a favourable review from The New Zealand Herald's Scott Kara, who said "it's Waretini's voice - deep, smooth and rich, like a block of crunchy chocolate - that make these songs special".

In September 2012, the album had reached no 2 in the IMNZ charts. By the 27th of that month and at its fourth week in the IMNZ charts, it had dropped down a notch to no 3. It spent two weeks in the New Zealand top 40 album charts, peaking at no 25.

== Track listing ==
No.	Title	Length
1.	"The Bridge"	3:26
2.	"The Wonder of You"	2:26
3.	"Rags to Riches"	1:58
4.	"Little Darlin'"	1:51
5.	"Concern"	2:50
6.	"Growing Old"	4:15
7.	"Gentleness"	3:07
8.	"Ethos"	3:12
9.	"Tarawera Eruption"	3:08
10.	"The River"	3:48
11.	"Requiem for a Soldier"	4:04
12.	"Maori Medley"	4:02
13.	"Yellow Horse"	3:27
14.	"Hine Hine"	3:35
15.	"Get Your Love Right"	3:30
16.	"No More Cloudy Days"	3:25
17.	"The Best Thing That Ever Happened To Me"	3:49
18.	"Easy"	3:58
19.	"Now Is the Hour"	2:41
20.	"Rugby World Cup"	2:33
