= Mandrill Studios =

New Zealand recording studio

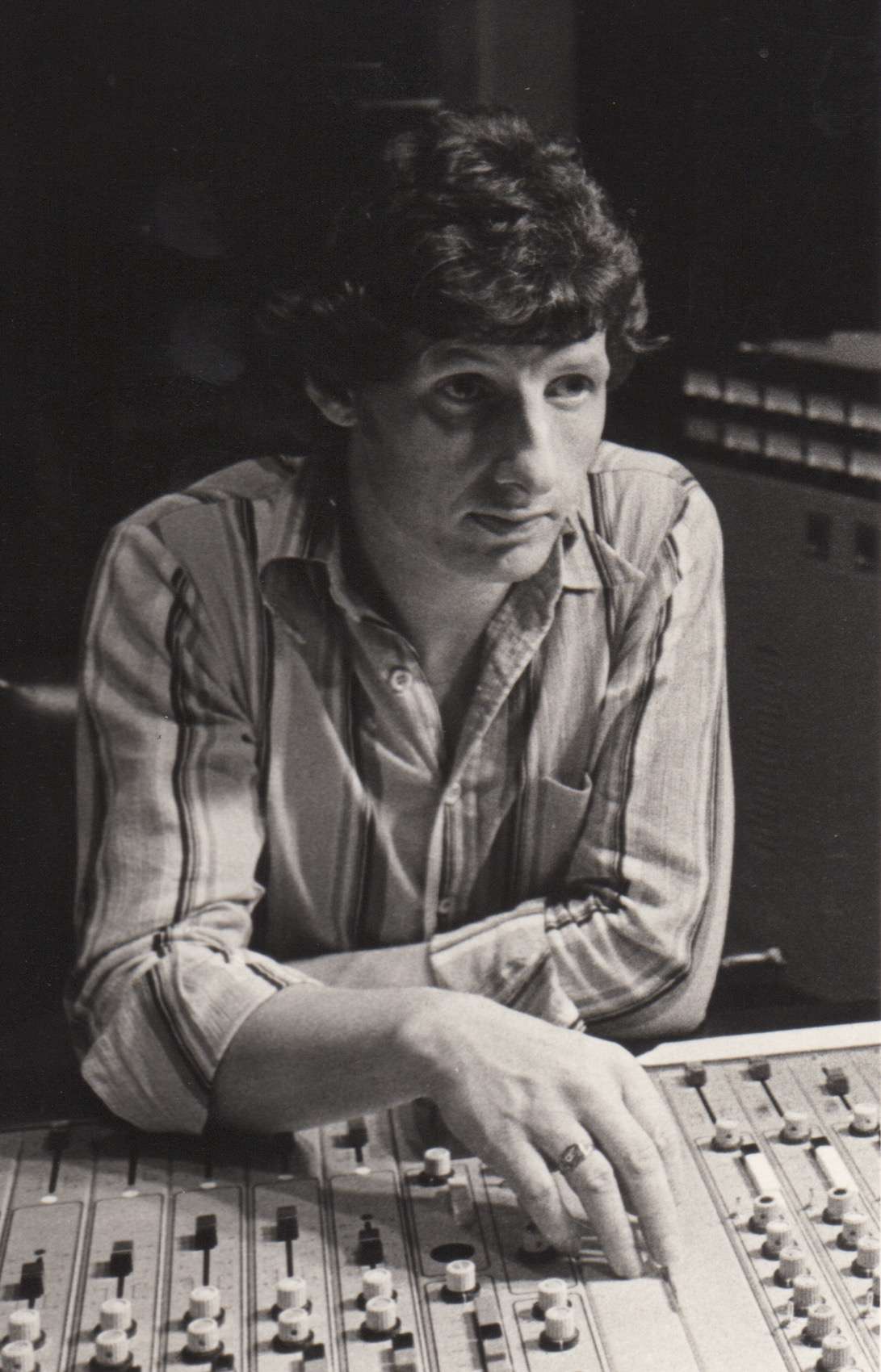
- Glyn Tucker working at Mandrill Studios in 1977
- Interactive map of Mandrill Studios
- Address: (Formerly at) 11 York St, Parnell, Auckland
- Coordinates: 36.8511°S 174.7792°E
- Owner: Glyn Tucker

Construction
- Opened: 1975

Founded in the early 1970s, Mandrill Studios was a recording studio in Parnell, a suburb of Auckland, New Zealand. Many of New Zealand's prominent artists had their work recorded there. The Mandrill record label grew out of the name of the studio. The studio stopped recording in October 1992.

== Background ==
The studio was located in the Auckland suburb of Parnell on York Street. It was owned by former 60s pop singers Glyn Tucker, Dave Hurley, along with composer and producer, Gary Daverne. Around 1980, Hurley and Daverne pulled out of the business, leaving Tucker as the sole owner of both the studio and the label.

== Artists recorded ==
In 1979, Kim Fowley, a producer from the United States, produced the five man group Streettalk at Mandrill Studios.

During the 1980s, artists such as Dance Exponents, The Mockers, Pink Flamingoes and the Screaming MeeMees were recorded there. The Mauri Hikitia album, which featured Rhonda, Ken Kincaid, and Deane Waretini was recorded there.

In 1981, the cast recording of Eaton Magoon Jr and Sir Robert Helpmann’s musical Aloha starring Derek Metzger, produced by Carl Doy was recorded with a live orchestra at Mandrill with the show’s Musical Director, Derek Williams as arranger and conductor.

=== List (selective) ===
- The Citizen Band - Citizen Band - 1978
- The Citizen Band - Just Drove Thru Town - 1979
- Desire - Desire - 1985
- Dance Exponents - Expectations - 1985
