= Albert Saunders =

Albert Saunders may refer to:

- Albert Charles Saunders (1874–1943), Canadian politician and jurist from Prince Edward Island
- Albert Bokhare Saunders (1880–1946), composer of romantic and light classical music

== See also ==
- Albert Sanders (1889–1957), Canadian politician
