= Emily Elizabeth =

Emily Elizabeth may refer to:

== Characters ==
- Emily Elizabeth Howard from Clifford the Big Red Dog

== People ==
- Emily Elizabeth Beavan
- Emily Elizabeth Carpenter
- Emily Elizabeth Dickinson
- Emily Elizabeth Douglas
- Emily Elizabeth Holman
- Emily Elizabeth Jones
- Emily Elizabeth Veeder
- Emily Elizabeth Parsons
