= Kevin Black (broadcaster) =

Kevin Black (1943–18 February 2013), known professionally as Blackie, was a New Zealand radio broadcaster. A former breakfast host on Auckland's Radio Hauraki, he was once the highest-paid private radio DJ in New Zealand.

Black left St. Patrick's College, Wellington at the age of 15, and was a seaman with the British Merchant Navy, before moving into radio. He was part of the same intake as Paul Holmes, and despite being commercial rivals the two remained friends throughout their respective careers.

Black died suddenly on 18 February 2013 after suffering a suspected heart attack at his home in Remuera, Auckland, just a few days short of his 70th birthday.

His last on-air role was at the 60s and 70s radio station Solid Gold, where he worked from 1997 until his retirement in 2009.

== Music ==
In 1981, Black and Co. recorded a parody version of the Deane Waretini hit "The Bridge", which was released on the RTC label. It was credited to Kevin Blackatini and the Frigids.

A collection of his Radio Hauraki prank calls entitled Kevin Black's Gold Solids was released on vinyl in 1982. This was followed by Hotline Loonacy (1985) and Phoney Business (1988).
