= Rhonda Bryers =

New Zealand singer of Māori descent

- Born: 1951; New Zealand
- Died: September, 2007 Honolulu, Hawaii
- Cause of death: Heart attack
- Genres: Pop
- Occupation: Entertainer
- Instrument: voice
- Spouse(s): Jock Ruddock (husband), Rick Bench (partner)

Rhonda Bryers (c. 1951–2007) was a New Zealand singer of Māori descent. During her career, she achieved similar levels of popularity to that of Sir Howard Morrison, John Rowles and Frankie Stevens, eventually becoming regarded as New Zealand's top entertainer, known as 'The Voice of New Zealand'.

== Early life and family ==
Bryers was born in Taumarunui to rugby player Ron Bryers and Betty. Her first husband was professional wrestler Jock Ruddock who was also her manager.

== Career ==
In 1972 Bryers was the first recipient of the Marie D'Albini Scholarship at the Conservatorium of Music at the University of Auckland, where she was taught by Charles Nalden, Peter Godfrey and Derek Williams. Bryers went on to study Opera under Dame Sister Mary Leo, a genre in which she enjoyed success. In 1981, during the Royal Variety Performance, singer John Rowles introduced her as the "Voice of New Zealand". Bryers went on to win the New Zealand Entertainer of the Year Award in 1984, which had previously been won by Sir Howard Morrison, Billy T James and Prince Tui Teka. Her version of "Pokarekare Ana" appears on the 1981 CBS various artists album The Mauri Hikitia, which also featured Deane Waretini, Ken Kincaid, the Lightwood family, and the Tri Lites.

After emigrating to Australia, Bryers was nominated 5 times for "Australian Female Entertainer of the Year".

In 1989 Bryers made her debut in Hawaii with a three-week engagement at the Monarch Room of the Royal Hawaiian Hotel in Honolulu, and became known thereafter as "Queen of the South Pacific". Another venue where she proved successful was the Dole Cannery Ballroom at Iwilei.

== Death ==
She died in Honolulu in September 2007 of a suspected heart attack, aged 55 after suffering from a flu-related virus. She was survived by her partner Rick Bench and her two sons, Scott and John.

== Discography ==
Albums
Title	Release info	Year	F	Notes
The Voice of New Zealand	CBS SBP 237551	1980	LP	
From New Zealand With Love - A Collection Of The Finest Maori Songs	Philips LP 6456 012	1980	LP	
Pearls	RCA VPL1 0489	1983	LP	

Various artist compilation appearances
Title	Release info	Year	Track(s)	F	Notes
The Mauri Hikitia	CBS	1981	"Pokarekare Ana"	LP	
Kiwi Country	Music World CD-PLAT-442	2010	New Zealand Trilogy: "Pokarekare Ana" / "Now Is The Hour" / "God Defend New Zealand"	CD	
