= Maewa Kaihau =

New Zealand composer (1879–1941)

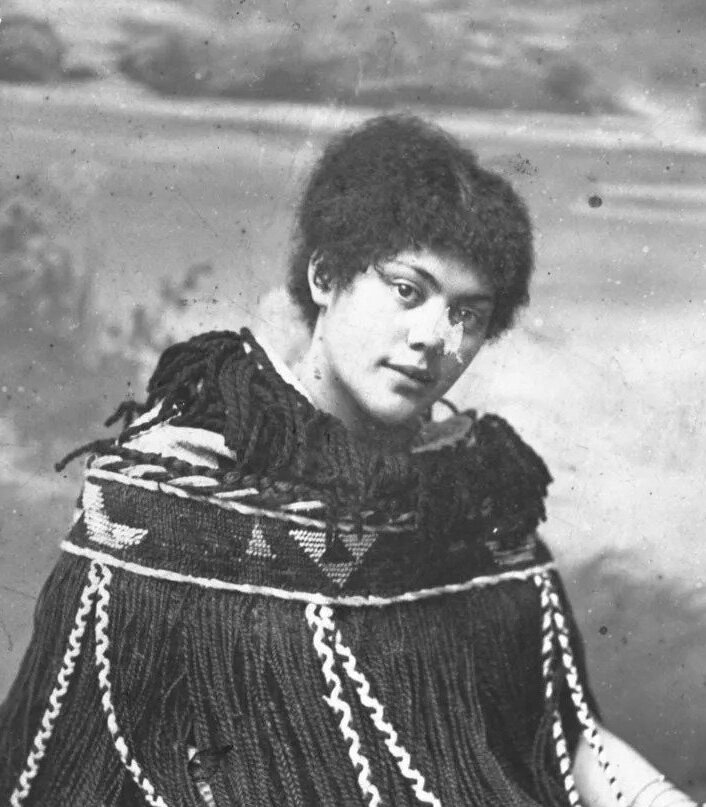
- Kaihau, unknown date
- Born: Louisa Flavell; 1879; Whangaroa, New Zealand
- Died: 27 February 1941 (aged 61–62); Auckland, New Zealand
- Other name: Louisa Maewa Molesworth
- Occupations: Composer; music teacher
- Notable work: "Now Is the Hour" (arrangement and Māori words)
- Spouses: Henare Kaihau (m. 1903; died 1920) Charles Molesworth (m. 1920)
- Children: 8

Erima Maewa Kaihau (née Flavell; 1879 – 27 February 1941) was a New Zealand composer, pianist and music teacher, sometimes known as Louisa Maewa Molesworth. She is best known for her contributions to the song "Now Is the Hour", and composed several other popular songs in both Māori and English.

== Life and career ==
Kaihau was born Louisa Flavell in Whangaroa to a French father and a Māori mother of Ngā Puhi descent. On her mother's side she was a descendant of Hōne Heke. In 1893, the family moved to Waiuku. In the late 1890s, she entered a customary marriage with Henare Kaihau, the Ngāti Te Ata leader and politician; their marriage was formalised in 1903. They had six daughters and two sons. After his death in 1920, she married Charles Molesworth. During their marriage she taught music and played the piano.

She is best-known for the song "Haere Ra" or "Po Atarau", known in English as "Now Is the Hour". The song was adapted from an existing piano tune, "Swiss Cradle Song", published under the name of Clement Scott (thought to be Albert Bokhare Saunders). "Swiss Cradle Song" became popular in New Zealand through its use as a Māori farewell song titled "Po Atarau" during World War I. Kaihau refined the song in 1920, when her daughter was one of several young women performing for the Prince of Wales on a state visit. Kaihau rearranged the song, wrote additional lyrics in English and Māori for the women to perform, and renamed it "Now Is the Hour" or "Haere Ra". The song was published under the title "Haere Ra" and credited Kaihau for both lyrics and tune; following a dispute from the owner of "Swiss Cradle Song", later editions only attributed the words to Kaihau.

In 1935, Kaihau sold her rights in "Now Is the Hour" to a New Zealand music company for £10. In the late 1940s, the song became popular overseas, being performed by Gracie Fields, Frank Sinatra, and Bing Crosby, among others. Time magazine in 1948 described the song's origins, without naming Kaihau:

It began 35 years ago as the Swiss Cradle Song, written by an Australian. Then a Maori woman who liked the tune made up some words to go with it, sang it at a Maori festival. The natives picked it up; so did white New Zealanders who mistakenly thought it an old Maori folksong.

Kaihau is also known for her compositions "Akoako, o te Rangi", "E Moe te Ra", and "Me Pehea Ra", which were published in Māori and English in 1918. These have been performed by many musicians including Fanny Howie. They were some of the first Māori songs to be performed in classical concerts. In 1926, two of these songs were featured on a special New Zealand programme on BBC Radio in the United Kingdom. In 1927, she wrote the lyrics for a song "The Huia" composed to welcome the Duke of York and his wife to New Zealand. In 1928, The New Zealand Herald said that her music "spoke something of that elusive spirit which is the unique heritage of the Maori". In 1930, she composed a farewell song for Lady Alice Fergusson, the wife of Sir Charles Fergusson, which was described by the Auckland Star as being of a "haunting, sincere style so characteristic of Maori music". In the 1930s, she was the music teacher of Ramai Hayward.

Kaihau died on 27 February 1941 at Auckland Hospital. She was survived by her husband, two sons, and two daughters.
