= Mahia Blackmore =

New Zealand singer (1949–2021)

- Born: Mahia Carole Blackmore; 2 January 1949; Palmerston North, New Zealand
- Died: 31 May 2021 (aged 72)
- Genres: Rhythm and blues, blues, classical, Maori music
- Occupation: Singer
- Labels: Tony McCarthy Recordings, Ode

Mahia Blackmore (2 January 1949 – 31 May 2021) was a New Zealand singer and bandleader who got her start as a singer in the 1960s. She was referred to as New Zealand's own queen of rhythm and blues. She was also part of the Billy TK band Powerhouse. She was profiled on Whenua, a radio show presented by Hēnare te Ua on numerous occasions.

== Background ==
The eldest of five children, she was born Mahia Carole Blackmore in Palmerston North, on 2 January 1949. She grew up with music, surrounded by it at home, at school and in the community at the marae. Her father was involved in music. In the 1940s, he was a member of Kapiti vocal group, the Te Whare Quintet.

In addition to being referred to as New Zealand's blues queen, or queen of rhythm and blues, she has been referred to as the New Zealand equivalent of Ma Rainey.

== Career ==
=== 1970s ===
In the early 1970s, she had a single released on the Tony McCarthy Recordings label, a label that captured the early recordings of Deane Waretini, and the only recordings of Abe Phillips of the Shadracks. Her single with the catalogue no TM1 was the first release for the label. The A side "The Long Road" was written by Lambert & Porter. The B side "Need You" was written By Tony McCarthy. Both sides were produced by him as well. Also during the early 1970 period, she was a member of powerhouse, a band that was put together by guitarist Billy TK.

=== 1980s–1990s ===
In the 1980s while fronting her band Meg and the Fones, she had a hit with "Little Tui" which she composed. It won the APRA Song of the Year award.

She provided backing vocals on the Maori Songs album by Kiri Te Kanawa. The album, released in 1999, released on the EMI Classics label was sung entirely in Maori and included songs such as "Hoki Hoki Tonu Mai", Hine E Hine", and "Pokarekare Ana".

=== 2000s ===
In February 2010, she was to appear at the Waiheke Wine and Food Festival, Auckland as part of Billy TK's Powerhouse. In May 2011, she was set to go to Fiji to perform and then later that year in November, Samoa. In early 2012, she was fronting the Paradise band which was due to appear at the Flaxmere Family Festival. In 2013, she was booked for the Queenstown Jazz and Blues Festival, an event that takes place over a period of four days, during the labor weekend, 24–27 October in Queenstown.

== Solo ==
=== Singles ===
- "The Long Road" / "I Need You" – Tony McCarthy Recordings TM1
- "Little Tui" / "Lifeboat" – Ode ODE 744

=== EP / mini-album ===
- Meg And The Fones – Meg Was Here – Ode SODEP 252 – (1986)

== Appearances ==
- Various artists – Pacific Messages Ode Recordings SODE239 – 1986
- Shona Laing – South – TVT Records TVT 2470 (CD) – 1988
- Kiri Te Kanawa – Maori Songs – EMI Classics: 7243 5 56828 2 6 – 1999

== Radio ==
- Profiling New Zealand Music, Introduced by Alan Beck – 29 October 1990 – Song: "Pacific Messages"
- Sunday Series 1. Programme 26 – 1995 – Blackmore is interviewed about her first acting role as the Blues Singer Ma Rainey.
- Whenua, 25/05/97 (Part 2 of 2) – Presented by Hēnare te Ua and Libby Hakaraia from the Radio New Zealand Studios, Auckland, on National Radio. – Mahia Blackmore interviewed.
- Whenua, Sunday 18/07/99 – Music: Mahia Blackmore & The Rhythm Mamas – "My Imagination"
- Whenua – Thursday 14/10/99 – Presented by Hēnare te Ua on National Radio – from the RNZ Studios, Auckland – Song: "Will You Still Love Me Tomorrow"
