= Il Silenzio (song) =

- German single cover

Instrumental by Nini Rosso
- English title: The Silence
- Released: December 1964
- Songwriter: Nini Rosso

"Il Silenzio" ("The Silence") is an instrumental piece, with a small spoken Italian lyric, notable for its trumpet theme. It was written in 1965 by trumpet player Nini Rosso, its thematic melody being an extension of the same Italian Cavalry bugle call Il Silenzio d’Ordinanza used by Russian composer Tchaikovsky to open his Capriccio Italien (often mistaken for the U.S. military bugle call "Taps").

== Success ==
It has become a worldwide instrumental standard that has sold around 10 million copies. It was a number-one hit in Italy, Germany, Austria, and Switzerland, and sold over five million copies by the end of 1967. Rosso was awarded a gold disc.

On 9 January 1965, it reached the number-two position in Australia and stayed in the charts for 19 weeks, and in the United Kingdom it peaked at number eight on the Record Retailer singles chart. In the United States, it reached number 32 in the Billboard Easy Listening charts. In Canada, the song reached number 24 in the RPM Adult Contemporary charts.

== Spoken lyrics ==
"Il Silenzio" contains these spoken lines:

Buona notte, amore
Ti vedrò nei miei sogni
Buona notte a te che sei lontano.

Good night, love
I'll see you in my dreams
Good night to you who are far away.

== Origin ==
"Il Silenzio" it derives from the "Silenzio militare" of the Italian army, whose origin descends directly from the signals for trumpeters in the barracks in the 19th-century regulations for the infantry of the Kingdom of Sardinia.

== Charts ==
Weekly chart performance for "Il silenzio”
Chart (1965–67)	Peak position
Austria (Ö3 Austria Top 40)	1
Belgium (Ultratop 50 Flanders)	1
Belgium (Ultratop 50 Wallonia)	2
Italy (Musica e dischi)	1
Netherlands (Dutch Top 100)	2
Norway (VG-lista)	4
UK Singles (OCC)	8
West Germany (Media Control)	1

== Uses ==
The song is the official club anthem of the Slovak football club FC Spartak Trnava. It is played before every home match.

Part of the song is also used in all the Italian barracks, to signal the end of the day. It has the same use in the Hellenic Army.

The song is also very often played at funerals in Poland, Slovenia and Croatia.

The tune has also been adapted to accompany the words of "Day is Done, Gone the Sun", which is sung by Brownies and Guides. A version can be accessed at Day is Done Vocal Arrangement of Taps

== Cover versions ==
Famous cover versions are by Dalida (who performed this song in French, Italian, and German), Eddie Calvert, Roy Black, Paul Mauriat, Marijan Domić, and Melissa Venema.

German trumpeter Roy Etzel's version of the song, without lyrics, was also popular in the US and reached number 140 in the Billboard Top LPs on Christmas 1965.

A Māori version, with words by George Tait, titled "The Bridge", was released by New Zealand entertainer Deane Waretini and topped the New Zealand singles charts in 1981.

Al Hirt released a version of the song as a single in 1965 that reached number 19 on the adult contemporary chart and number 96 on the Billboard Hot 100.

In 2008, the soloist was a 13-year-old Dutch girl, Melissa Venema, backed by André Rieu and the Royal Orchestra of the Netherlands.

It was released by the London Swing Orchestra in 2015 as the final track of their fourth album, and features the trumpet of Michael Lovatt, who is now lead trumpet with the John Wilson Orchestra and the BBC Big Band, Upbeat Records URCD266.

Dutch hit trumpeter Ryan Ricks (Rik Mol) has recorded "Il Silenzio" in 2018 for his album C'est la Vie released by Universal Music Group CD20186.

In the 2014 film "American Sniper", about Navy Seal Chris Kyle, was played at end of film, while showing funeral procession and memorial service at Cowboys Stadium in Arlington, Texas.
