= Ruth Wilkinson (community leader) =

New Zealand pharmacist & community leader (1901–1985)

Ruth Wilkinson QSM (née Webb, 8 February 1901 – 14 December 1985) was a community leader and local historian in New Zealand.

== Early life ==
Wilkinson was born on 8 February 1901 in Rotorua, the youngest of five children of Mary Wilson and her husband, Seth Webb, a blacksmith. The family moved to Cambridge in 1908 and Wilkinson attended the local primary school, followed by Hamilton High School.

== Adult life ==
At the age of 16, Wilkinson began studying pharmacy by correspondence; her studies were interrupted by work assisting during the 1918 influenza epidemic and she passed her final examinations in 1921. Wilkinson married in 1923 and, as was expected at the time, gave up her career to be a housewife.

In 1947 Wilkinson's husband Kenneth was elected mayor of Cambridge, holding the position until 1953 and again from 1956 to 1962. Wilkinson supported him in his election campaigning and mayoral duties. In 1960 she became a justice of the peace and in 1963 she was appointed as an organiser of the Halls of Residence Campaign for the new University of Waikato.

Wilkinson was also a writer and local historian. In the 1920s and 1930s she wrote short stories on family life for the New Zealand Herald and the Auckland Weekly News. She later wrote a number of works on the history of Cambridge. In the 1985 New Year Honours, Wilkinson was awarded the Queen's Service Medal for community service. She died in Cambridge on 14 December of the same year.

=== Publications ===
- First families of Cambridge (Cambridge Historical Society, 1972)
- Life was like that (1974)
- Just roaming (1978)
- Streets of Cambridge and Senior Citizens Tales, 1980, Cambridge Independent
- Our Cambridge, 1886–1986 (Cambridge Independent, 1986)
