= I'm Walking Behind You =

1953 single by Billy Reid

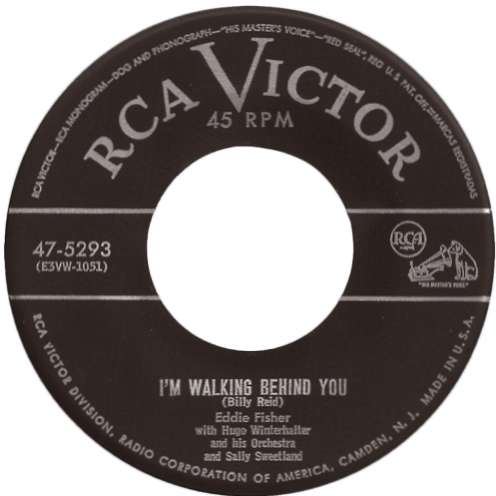

Single by Eddie Fisher with Hugo Winterhalter and his Orchestra and Sally Sweetland
- B-side: "Just Another Polka"
- Published: 9 April 1953
- Released: April 1953
- Recorded: 7 April 1953
- Studio: Manhattan Center, New York City
- Genre: Ballad, traditional pop
- Length: 3:10
- Label: RCA Victor
- Songwriter: Billy Reid
- Producer: Hugo Winterhalter

Eddie Fisher singles chronology
| "Downhearted" (1953) | "I'm Walking Behind You" (1953) | "With These Hands" (1953) |

"I'm Walking Behind You" is a popular song which was written by Billy Reid and published in 1953. The recording by American singer Eddie Fisher was a no. 1 hit in both the US and UK Singles charts, but it had previously been recorded by Reid's former partner, Dorothy Squires, who had a hit with the song in the UK.

== Dorothy Squires recording ==
The original version was by British singer Dorothy Squires, who had previously been in a relationship with the song's composer, Billy Reid. In 1952, she had met an aspiring actor, Roger Moore. The lyrics of "I'm Walking Behind You" concern a protagonist walking behind a former lover on their wedding day, and were written by Reid upon his learning that Squires had begun a relationship with the younger Moore. She wanted to record Reid's composition, but her A&R man at Columbia Records, Ray Martin, did not like it, and refused to record the song. Squires discovered that she was not under contract to Columbia, and hired a studio to record the song, paying for the session – scheduled for 27 February – herself. Her recording manager, Alan A. Freeman of Polygon Records, and publisher Jimmy Phillips, were unsure about the song, as Eddie Fisher had turned it down already. Squires' recording of "I'm Walking Behind You", reached no. 15 in the UK charts in May 1953.

Phillips sent an acetate copy of Squires' recording to America, however, resulting in Fisher changing his mind and recording the song, which became a hit for him. Squires was furious, and flew to America to confront James Franks, the president of Coral Records, the company responsible for releasing her version in the States. A contemporary American reviewer wrote, "As far as I'm concerned it's the best etching of the song. Sung with lots of heart, reminiscent of Vera Lynn." (Lynn herself recorded the song as part of a contemporary medley.) In June 1953, Squires and Moore were married in New Jersey.

Squires re-recorded the song for her 1958 Pye Nixa album Sings Billy Reid, a collection of Reid's compositions. She featured the song in her concert repertoire. These performances commercially released on three albums:

- This is My Life on Ace of Clubs (subtitled as "her one-woman show recorded 'live' in Llanelli, South Wales") in 1967, as part of a medley
- At The London Palladium, made at the venue of the same name on Sunday, December 6, 1970 (issued on President in 1971)
- Live At The Theatre Royal Drury Lane, from a concert at the venue of that name (Pye, 1974)

== Eddie Fisher recording ==
Eddie Fisher's rendition of the song, featuring soprano Sally Sweetland, became a No. 1 hit single on both the Cash Box and Billboard record charts in 1953 in the United States, as well as reaching number one on the UK Singles Chart. The recording by Fisher with Hugo Winterhalter's orchestra and chorus was made at the Manhattan Center in New York City on 7 April 1953, also being produced by Winterhalter. It was released by RCA Victor on both 78 and 45 rpm single formats (catalogue numbers 20-5293 and 47-5293) in the United States that same month. Fisher's single entered the Billboard Best Selling Singles chart on 9 May 1953, and reached No. 1 on 25 July 1953, staying there for two weeks. It also reached No. 1 on the Billboard charts for Most Played by Jockeys (on 11 July, for three weeks) and Most Played in Juke Boxes (on 27 June, for seven weeks).

In the UK, the Fisher recording was issued by EMI's His Master's Voice label (catalogue number B 10489) in May 1953. It first entered the UK chart for the week ending 16 May 1953, and reached No. 1 on 26 June, its sixth week on the listings. The single spent a week at No. 1, and 18 weeks on chart in total.

A stereo re-recording by Fisher was later released. Arranged and conducted by Jerry Fielding, it was made at United Recorders in Las Vegas, and issued on Fisher's 1965 Dot Records album When I Was Young, produced by Randy Wood.

== Contemporary reception and recordings ==
"I'm Walking Behind You" entered the UK's sheet music sales chart on 4 April 1953. It peaked at No. 2, and spent 31 weeks on the chart in total. The song spent five weeks at No. 2, kept off the top spot by "In a Golden Coach" and "The Moulin Rouge Theme". Prior to its chart debut, the earliest released versions were by Dorothy Squires and Gary Miller in March that year. Further contemporary versions issued in the UK were by Billy Cotton and his Band (with vocal by Doreen Stephens), Jimmy Young (recorded on February 3), Frank Sinatra, Donald O'Connor, Vic Damone and organist Ethel Smith. Damone's version was re-issued on Mercury in June 1954, following the end of their agreement with Oriole, who had originally released the recording in the UK.

Sinatra's version of the song was the second title from his first recording session at Capitol Records in Los Angeles on 2 April. This recording, with backing led by Axel Stordahl (Sinatra's musical director from his early years as a solo artist), was issued as a single by Capitol (catalog number 2450) and peaked at No. 7 on the Billboard pop charts.

== See also ==
- List of number-one singles of 1953 (U.S.)
- List of number-one singles from the 1950s (UK)
