= Deane Waretini Snr =

Māori baritone singer

Deane Waretini
- Died: 1967
- Occupations: Singer, entertainer
- Years active: 1926 -
- Label: Parlophone

Deane Waretini Snr was a famous Maori baritone singer from Rotorua. He was possibly the first Maori singer to be commercially recorded, together with his cousin Ana Hato. His son Deane Waretini would also be a first with his no 1 hit The Bridge, which became the first Maori language song to be no 1 in the New Zealand music charts.

== Background ==
In 1926/27, he and his cousin Hato began recording. During a performance for the Duke and Duchess of York, they were recorded by Parlophone Records technicians from the label's Australian branch. This was recorded on small portable acoustic equipment. This resulted in the first locally recorded commercial music that was to be released on shellac 78 rpm disc format.

Along with his cousin Hato, he was contracted to Parlophone Records. An advertisement from Parlophone in the 1930s showed that they already had two solo releases under his name, as well as four in duet with his cousin.

Waretini died in December 1967.

== Later years ==
After his funeral, a relative George Tait, took his son Deane under his wing and would become his mentor and manager.

In 1996, the Ana Hato – raua ko Deane Waretini, Legendary Recordings 1927–1949 album was released by the Kiwi label.

In 2015, some of his records turned up at the St Michael's and Kelburn Village Fair's vintage and clothing and bric-a-brac in Wellington. Someone pointed out to organizer Patricia Thompson some boxes and suitcases of very old 78s. Among some of the records that were covered in mouse droppings were eight recordings by Ana Hato, and Waretini. One of them was "Medley and Haka" by Ana Hato and himself. These were made during a performance in Rotorua when the Duke and Duchess of York visited in 1926.

== Discography (selective) ==
Singles (solo)
Title	Release info	Year	Notes
"Haere Tonu" (War Song) / "Ka Mate" (War Song)	Parlophone A2804		
"May I Not Love?" / "Po Ataru" (With Ana Hato)	Parlophone A2806		
"Karu Karu" (Traditional Fishing Chant) / "Te Arawa" (Canoe Action Song)	TANZA Z12	1950	Side A, Deane Waretini with The Arawa Concert Party; Side B, The Arawa Concert Party

Albums
Title	Release info	Year	Notes
Ana Hato – raua ko Deane Waretini, Legendary Recordings 1927–1949	Kiwi SLC-242		
