= Tony McCarthy Recordings =

- Founded: c. 1970
- Status: Inactive
- Genre: Various
- Country of origin: New Zealand
- Location: New Zealand

Tony McCarthy Recordings was a New Zealand record label owned by record producer Tony McCarthy. Some of the artists on the label were Deane Waretini and Mahia Blackmore. The label is also a representation of the only released recordings by singer Abe Phillips who was killed in an accident in 1971.

== Tony McCarthy ==
Tony McCarthy was a songwriter and record producer. In 1972, McCarthy's composition "Tellabout" for singer Toni Williams was an APRA Silver Scroll nominated song. In 1973, he was involved in a recording session with teenage singer David Curtis who had a top 20 hit in 1970 with "Wheel Of Fortune".

With Sonny Keepa, he composed "E Te Iwi E".

== Artists ==
=== Mahia Blackmore ===
The first release on the label was by Mahia Blackmore. The A side "The Long Road" was written by Lambert & Porter. The B side "Need You" was written By Tony McCarthy, and both sides were produced by him as well. Blackmore would later be part of powerhouse, a band put together in the early 70s by guitarist Billy TK. In early 2012, she was fronting the Paradise band which was due to appear at the Flaxmere Family Festival.

=== Abe Phillips ===
The Shadracks were a band from Hastings that were formed by Tom Greening in 1964. Abe Phillips joined in 1968 and as a result, the band experienced a boost. The line up then was Abe Phillips on vocals, Tom Greening on drums and vocals, Haromi Greening on vocals, Bill Prentice on tenor sax and rhythm guitar, Kepa Toa on lead guitar, Ricky Witoko on keyboards and sax, and Lambeth Bennett on bass guitar. In 1971, Tony McCarthy recorded Abe Phillips and the Shadracks in Wellington. In July 1971, Phillips left the group to concentrate on his solo career. Some time after that, he recorded "Don't Think You Remember Me" / "The Impossible Dream". In November 1971, Phillips was the winner of the Schweppes talent contest. He was on the verge of becoming internationally known, and it appeared he was headed for stardom.

On 18 December 1971, Phillips was coming back from a concert in Wellington and was killed in a head-on car collision. It was reported in 19 December edition of the Sunday News, that the single, "Don't Think You Remember Me" / "The Impossible Dream" was selling well. Prince Tui Teka, and The Shadracks performed at his funeral. Forty years after his death, Phillips and The Shadracks became the subject of a 30-minute tribute documentary by Dean Mardon. Phillips was also a cousin of jazz cabaret singer Bridgette Allen.

=== Deane Waretini ===
Deane Waretini had two singles released on the label, "Trouble In My Life" bw ""The Long Road" and "Melody Butterfly" bw "Trouble in My Life. He would go on to have a No.1 hit in 1981 with "The Bridge".

=== Kount 5 Plus 2 ===
Kount 5 Plus 2 were a group consisting of five men and two women. They appeared on New Zealand's New Faces in the final heat of the variety competition. Their single "Anybody There" was followed by "Tomorrow's Child".

=== Tui Fox ===
Tui Fox a.k.a. Tui Hemana was a singer from Hato Paora who performed in both New Zealand and Fiji. He appeared on television during the 1970s. When Fox was a young singer, he competed against an equally young Bunny Walters at Joe Brown's Search for Stars. The event was held at the Rotorua Soundshell in 1969. Fox won the final, and Walters came in second. His single "You Can't Stop Love" bw "Only A Fool Breaks His Own Heart" was released on the Joe Brown label around 1970. "You Can't Stop Love" was one of nine songs listed among recordings by Bunny Walters, Stan White and Nash Chase as eligible for the Golden Disc Awards. His single "Bounce Baby Bounce" bw "Les Bicyclettes de Belsize" was released in 1974. "Bounce Baby Bounce" by Fox appears on the Māori Showbands, Balladeers & Pop Stars various artists compilation.

== Releases (selective) ==
Singles
Artist	Title	Catalogue	Year	Notes #
Mahia Blackmore	"The Long Road" / "I Need You"	Tony McCarthy Recordings TM1		
Abe Phillips	"Don't Think You Remember Me" / "The Impossible Dream"	Tony McCarthy Recordings TM2	1971	
Abe Phillips	"Sing a Simple Song" / "United We Stand"	Tony McCarthy Recordings TM3	1971	
Deane Waretini	"Trouble in My Life" / "The Long Road"	Tony McCarthy Recordings TM4	1972	
Mark Delacy	"Think A Lot" / " Allison"	Tony McCarthy Recordings TM 5	1972	
Deane Waretini	"Melody Butterfly" / "Trouble In My Life"	Tony McCarthy Recordings TM 6		
Kount 5 Plus 2	"Anybody There" / "Tomorrow's Child"	Tony McCarthy Recordings TM 7	1973	
Tui Fox	"Bounce Baby Bounce" / "Les Bicyclettes de Belsize"	Tony McCarthy Recordings TM 10	1974	
