= Kevin Herlihy =

New Zealand softball player

Kevin Herlihy MBE
Personal information
- Full name: Kevin Francis Herlihy
- National team: New Zealand
- Born: 19 August 1947; Wellington, New Zealand
- Died: 5 July 2006 (aged 58); Hamilton, New Zealand
- Education: St Patrick's College, Wellington
- Spouse: Sandra Gillian Mollier (m. 1969)

Sport
- Sport: Softball
- Position: Pitcher

Achievements and titles
- World finals: 1976, 1984

Kevin Francis Herlihy MBE (19 August 1947 – 5 July 2006) was a New Zealand softball player.

Born in Wellington on 19 August 1947, Herlihy was educated at St Patrick's College, Wellington from 1961 to 1965. In 1969, he married Sandra Gillian Mollier, and the couple had two children.

A pitcher, Herlihy played for the New Zealand national softball team between 1966 and 1984, and was named New Zealand softballer of the year on three occasions. He was a member of the New Zealand team at six Men's Softball World Championships, winning the title in 1976 (finishing first equal with Canada) and in 1984. In the 1985 New Year Honours, he was appointed a Member of the Order of the British Empire, for services to softball, and in 1990 he was inducted into the New Zealand Sports Hall of Fame.

Herlihy died in Waikato Hospital in Hamilton on 5 July 2006, after suffering two heart attacks in a two-week period and undergoing heart surgery.
