= 1985 New Year Honours (New Zealand) =

Annual awards for New Zealanders

The 1985 New Year Honours in New Zealand were appointments by Elizabeth II on the advice of the New Zealand government to various orders and honours to reward and highlight good works by New Zealanders. The awards celebrated the passing of 1984 and the beginning of 1985, and were announced on 31 December 1984.

The recipients of honours are displayed here as they were styled before their new honour.

== Knight Bachelor ==
- Dr William Henry Cooper CBE – of Auckland. For services to education and the community.
- The Honourable Lester Francis Moller – of Auckland; judge of the High Court.
- Desmond John Sullivan – of Lower Hutt; chief District Court judge.

== Order of the Bath ==
=== Companion (CB) ===
Military division

- Air Vice Marshal David Manson Crooks OBE – Royal New Zealand Air Force.

== Order of Saint Michael and Saint George ==
=== Companion (CMG) ===
- Emily Elizabeth Carpenter – of Dunedin. For services to the Consumer Council and home science.
- Kevin Benjamin O'Brien – of Wellington. For services to Victoria University of Wellington and the Commerce Commission.
- Professor Emeritus Geoffrey Joseph Schmitt – of Auckland. For services to industry and education.
- Alfred Charles Shailes – of Wellington; Controller and Auditor-General, Audit Department, 1975–1983.

== Order of the British Empire ==
=== Dame Commander (DBE) ===
Civil division

- Catherine Anne Tizard – of Auckland. For public and community service.
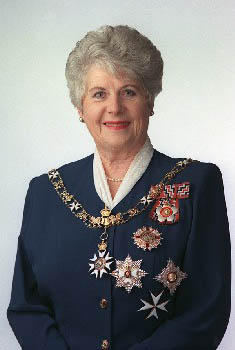
Dame Catherine Tizard

=== Knight Commander (KBE) ===
Civil division

- Frederick Miles Warren CBE – of Christchurch. For services to architecture.
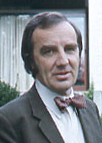
Sir Miles Warren

=== Commander (CBE) ===
Civil division

- Brian George Conway Elwood JP – of Palmerston North. For services to local government and the City of Palmerston North.
- Charles Philip Littlejohn – of Wellington; Clerk of the House of Representatives.
- Professor Alton Donald Macalister ED – of Dunedin. For services to oral surgery and the community.
- The Right Reverend William Allan Pyatt – of Christchurch; Bishop of Christchurch, 1966–1983.
- Bruce Houlton Slane – of Auckland; president of the New Zealand Law Society.
- Professor Christian Karlson Stead – of Auckland. For services to literature.
- Dr Desmond John Woods – of Auckland. For services to paediatrics, especially intellectually handicapped and disabled children.

Military division

- Brigadier Alfred Connell Hamilton – Brigadiers' List.
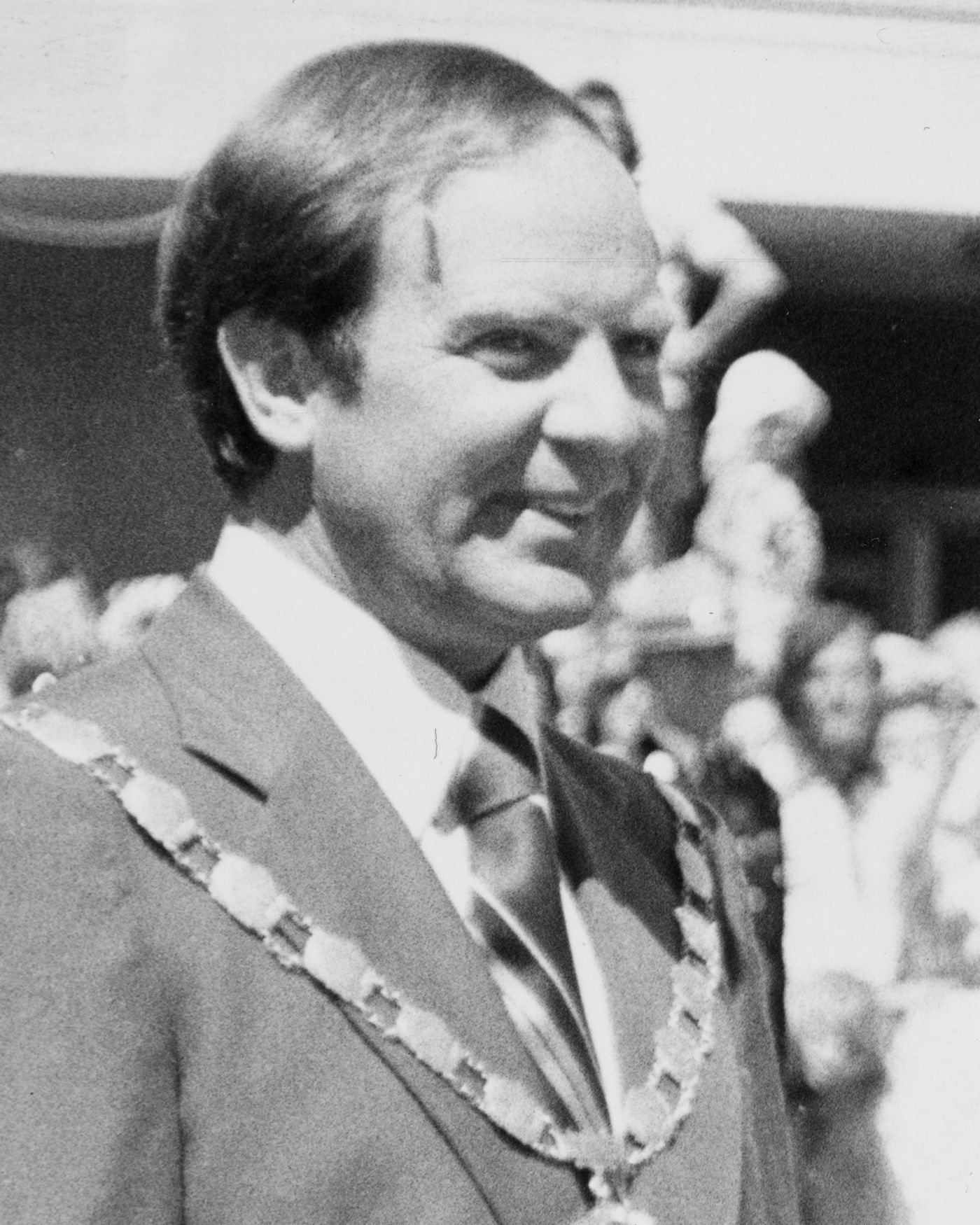
Brian Elwood

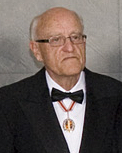
C. K. Stead

=== Officer (OBE) ===
Civil division

- Leo Vernon Bensemann – of Christchurch. For services to art, literature and printing.
- Brenda Cecilia Brankin – of Christchurch; lately chief nurse, Canterbury Hospital Board.
- Niall Frederick Burgess JP – of Auckland. For services to local government.
- William George Cammick – of Auckland. For services to sport, especially boxing.
- Neil John Clarke JP – of Paeroa. For services to the road transport industry and the community.
- Herbert Roy Dutton – of Raumati South. For services to the New Zealand Olympic and Commonwealth Games Association.
- Judge Trevor Robert Gillies – of Auckland. For services to the community.
- Antony Hearn QC – of Christchurch. For services to the legal profession.
- William Joseph Karetai JP – of Little River. For services to the community.
- Ria May McBride – of Tauranga. For public services.
- Bruce Conway McCormack – of Temuka. For services to basketball.
- Professor Peter John McKelvey – of Christchurch; professor and head of School of Forestry, University of Canterbury, 1967–1984.
- William John Main – of Wanganui. For services to cycling.
- James Murray Print – of Auckland. For services to education and the community.
- Gladys Mabel Symes JP – of Havelock North. For services to the New Zealand Red Cross Society, netball and the community.
- John Alexander Young JP – of Wellington. For services to journalism and the community.

Military division

- Commander Ronald Kenneth Longley – Royal New Zealand Navy.
- Colonel Lindsay George Williams MC – Colonels' List.
- Group Captain Peter Raymond Adamson MBE – Royal New Zealand Air Force.

=== Member (MBE) ===
Civil division

- Quentin Edward Angus – of Wellington. For services to the disabled.
- Roger Gault Barrowclough – of Dunedin. For services to mountain safety.
- Gordon Christie JP – of Napier. For public and community service.
- Russell Coutts – of Auckland. For services to yachting.
- Eric Nelson Craig – of Auckland. For services to music.
- Ian Gordon Ferguson – of Auckland, For services to canoeing.
- John Edward Fitzgerald – of Auckland. For services to local-body and community affairs.
- John Philip Harding – of Kaponga. For services to the community.
- Harold Brydon Harvey – of Stoke. For services to tennis.
- Kevin Francis Herlihy – of Hamilton (presently in the United States). For services to softball.
- Norman Leslie Hider – of Christchurch. For services to Highland Pipe Bands Association of New Zealand.
- Patrick Kelliher JP – of Palmerston North. For services to local-body and community affairs.
- Douglas Sidney Stratford Kerr – of Wellington; lately principal private secretary to the Prime Minister.
- Shona Katrine MacTavish – of Dunedin. For services to the arts.
- Dorothy Huhana Mihinui JP – of Whakarewarewa. For services to the tourist industry and the community.
- Richard George Newman – superintendent, New Zealand Police.
- Robert Edward Perks – of Christchurch. For services to music.
- Neville George Pickering JP – of Petone. For services to local government.
- Dr William Mummery Platts – of Christchurch. For services to medicine.
- Laurence Bernard Roberts – of Levin. For services to the community.
- Sidney Douglas Sherwood – of Lower Hutt. For services to New Zealand War Amputees Association.
- Miljenko Vladimir Srhoj – of Waiharara. For services to local-body and community affairs.
- Bert Sutcliffe – of Auckland. For services to cricket.
- Mark James Todd – of Cambridge. For services to equestrian sport.
- Ruth Mellor Wylie – of Lower Hutt. For services to the National Council of Women of New Zealand.

Military division

- Warrant Officer Seaman Jack Hern Baigent BEM – Royal New Zealand Navy.
- Warrant Officer Steward Penelope Fern Smith – Royal New Zealand Navy.
- Lieutenant John Christopher Trott – Royal New Zealand Navy.
- Captain and Quartermaster Frederick William Daniel – Royal New Zealand Infantry Regiment.
- Warrant Officer Class I Douglas Harry Roberts – Corps of Royal New Zealand Engineers.
- Major Raymond James Seymour – Royal New Zealand Infantry Regiment.
- Warrant Officer James Ashley Fordyce – Royal New Zealand Air Force.
- Warrant Officer Terence Trevor Healey – Royal New Zealand Air Force.
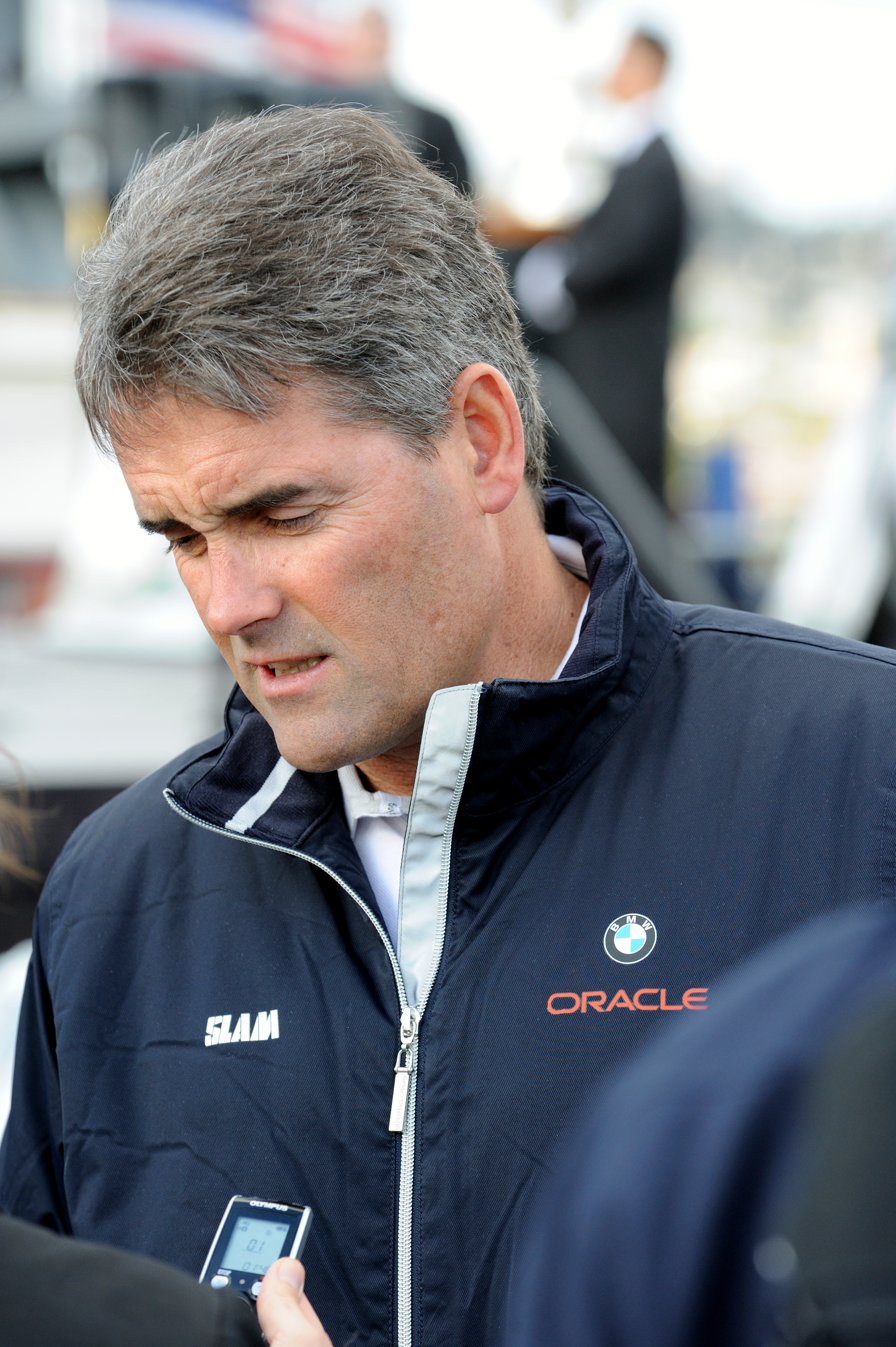
Russell Coutts

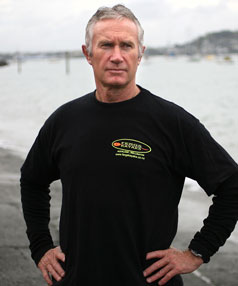
Ian Ferguson

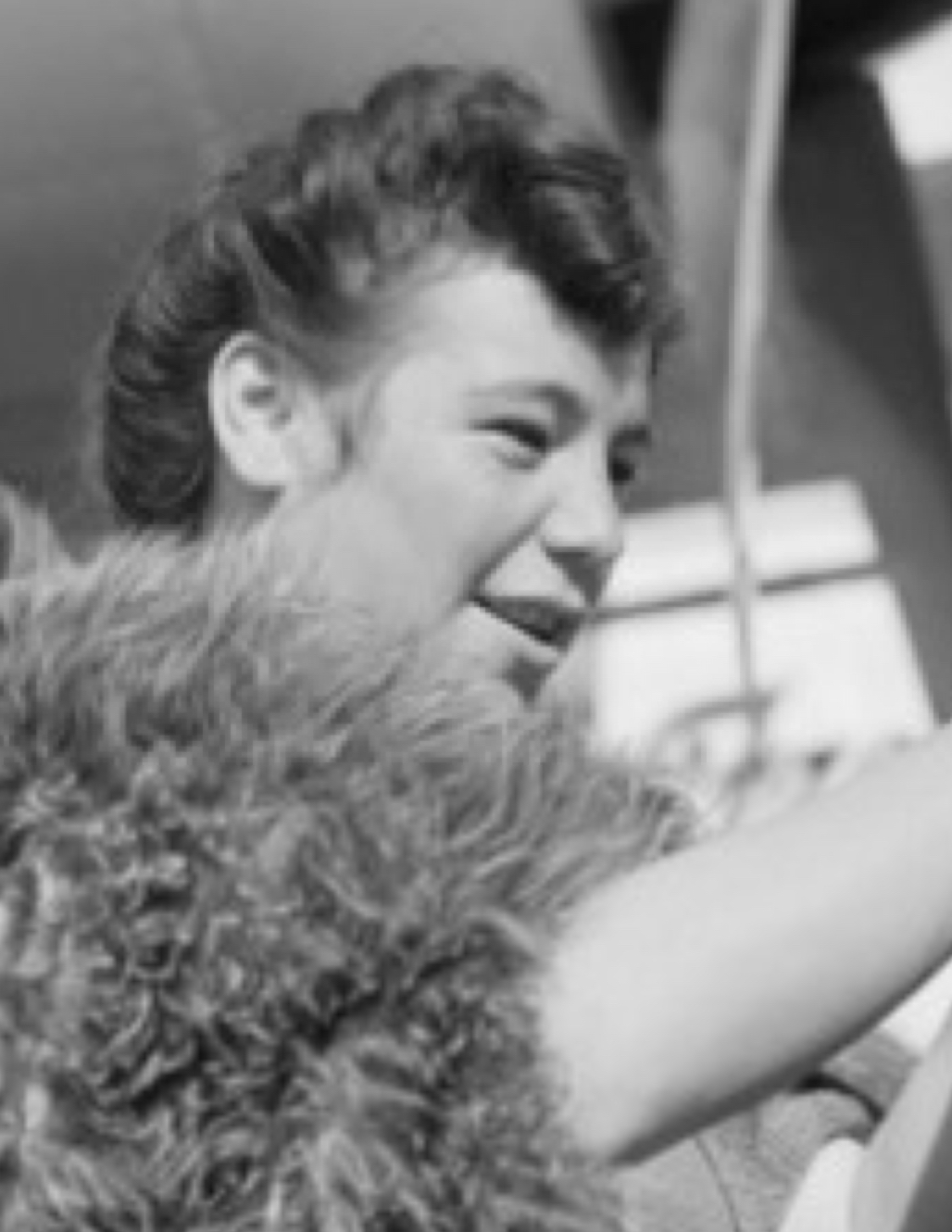
Bubbles Mihinui

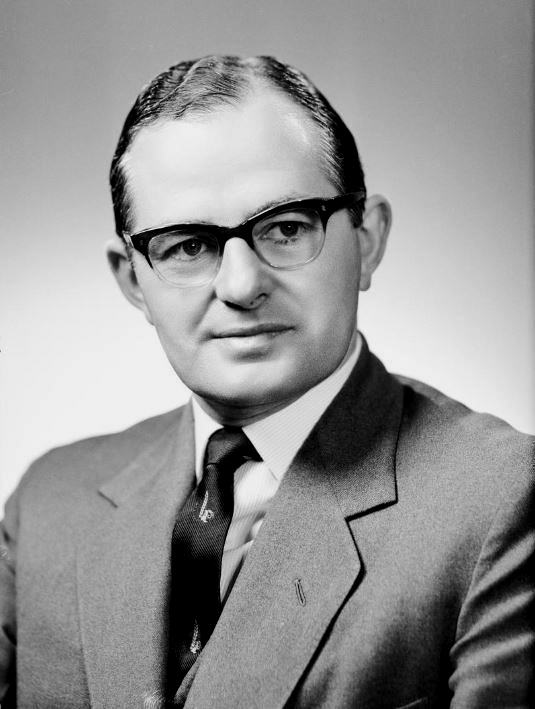
Neville Pickering

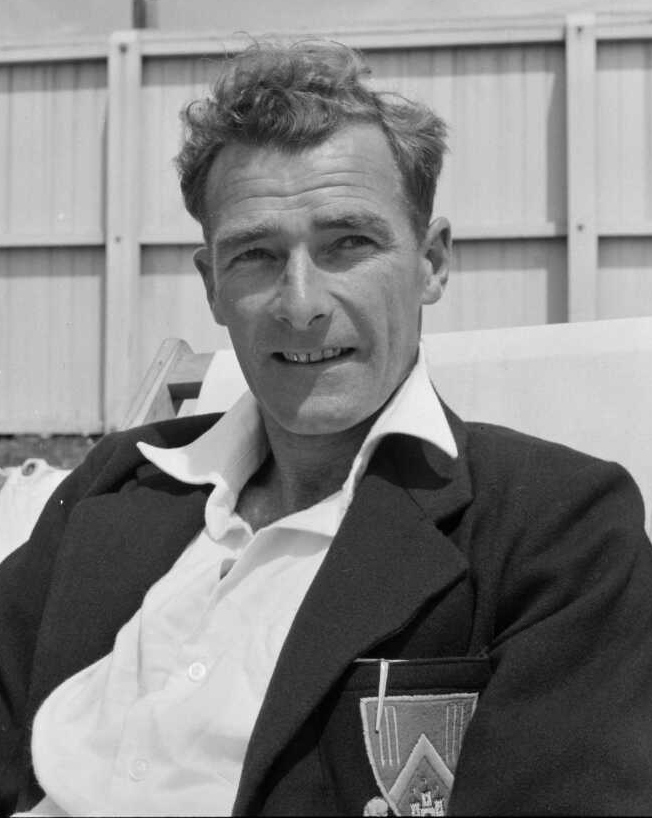
Bert Sutcliffe

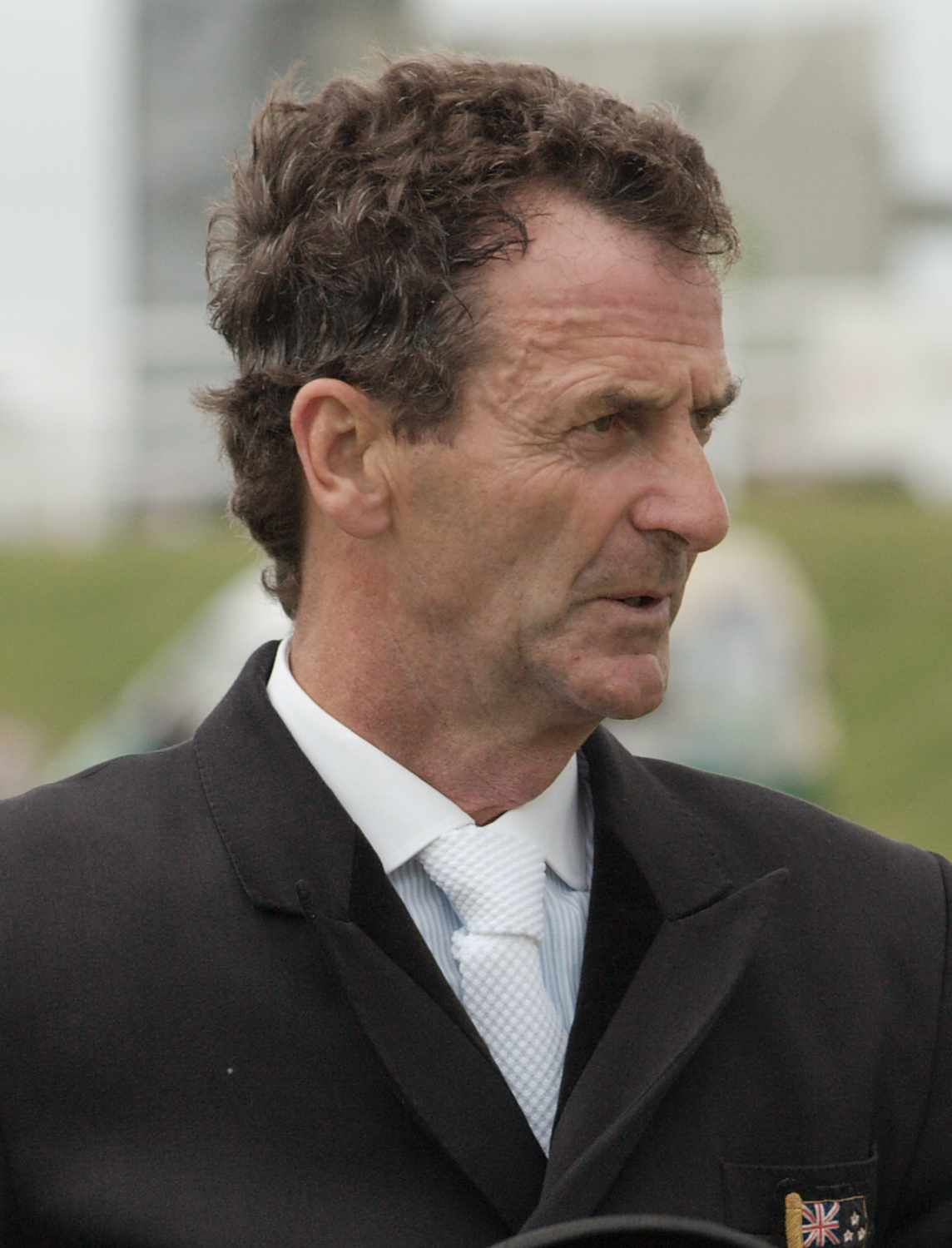
Mark Todd

== British Empire Medal (BEM) ==
Military division

- Chief Petty Officer Seaman Peter Hill – Royal New Zealand Navy.
- Corporal (now Temporary Sergeant) John Howard Joseph Ward – Royal New Zealand Corps of Transport.
- Staff Sergeant (Temporary Warrant Officer Class II) Sydney William Worster – Royal New Zealand Corps of Transport (Territorial Force).
- Flight Sergeant Kenneth James Arthur – Royal New Zealand Air Force.
- Flight Sergeant Alexander Joseph Marshall – Royal New Zealand Air Force.

== Companion of the Queen's Service Order (QSO) ==
=== For community service ===
- Rewi Alley MM – of Beijing, China.
- Joyce Joan Herd – of Dunedin.
- James MacDonald Howden – of Lower Hutt.
- Louisa Emily, Lady Macfarlane – of Christchurch.
- Myrtle May Paulsen – of Michoacán, Mexico.
- Betty Head Togalea JP – of Auckland.
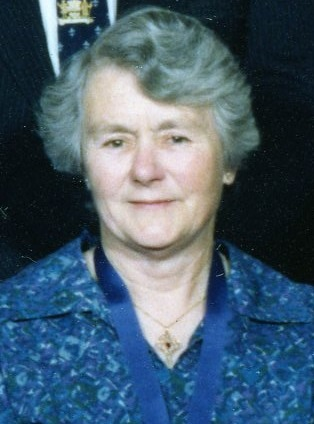
Bunty Herd

=== For public services ===
- Norman Wilfred Currie – of Wellington; lately public trustee, Public Trust Office.
- John (Jack) Dellaca – of Westport.
- Thomas Christopher Grigg – of Hororata; chairman, North Canterbury Hospital Board.
- John Hobson MBE – of Kumeū; lately superintendent, Auckland Maximum Security Prison, Department of Justice.
- Lieutenant Colonel Arthur Robert Percy Hughes JP – of Swanson.
- Clyde Molesworth Jeffrey BEM JP – of Napier.
- Taxi Aonui Kapua-Te Ahuru – of Taupō.
- Murray Raymond Mander – of Tauranga; lately Valuer-General, Valuation Department.
- Alexander James Lloyd Martin – of Wellington.

== Queen's Service Medal (QSM) ==
=== For community service ===
- Alys Alexander – of Napier.
- Ida Ailsa Cressey Boag – of Hastings.
- Mary Elizabeth Brown – of Hamilton.
- Duncan David Dakers – of Tauranga.
- John Stuart Dawson – of Nelson.
- The Very Reverend Derek Lionel Eaton – of Christchurch.
- Jean Ivy Gadd – of Lower Hutt.
- Leslie John Grant – of Timaru.
- Joseph Green JP – of Christchurch.
- Kathleen Henderson – of Oamaru.
- Dorothy Jeane Horne (Mrs Chapman) – of Wellington.
- John Leonard Humphrey – of Blenheim.
- Thomas Michael Henry Jackson – of Aickens, Westland.
- Mark Anthony Marinovich – of Auckland.
- Emily Elizabeth Mason – of Timaru.
- Duff Heron Maxwell – of Tauranga.
- Zelda Alanstan Paul – of Tokoroa.
- Madge Estelle Ann Rauhihi – of Porirua.
- Margaret Francis Read – of Hamilton.
- The Reverend Lagaua Talagi – of Auckland.
- Douglas Howard Thomas – of Upper Hutt.
- Jean Reese Twyman – of Rotorua.
- Ani Kui Rini Wihone Hoa Koha (Mrs Wijohn) – of Hokianga.
- Ruth Wilkinson – of Cambridge.
- Arthur Allan Wilks – of Wanganui.

=== For public services ===
- Rosemary Ann Ash – of Wellington.
- Margaret Jean Bodmin – of Morrinsville.
- Ian Alexander Colquhoun – of Paraparaumu Beach; deputy rector, Palmerston North Boys' High School.
- Margaret Alberta Vivian Day – of Nelson.
- Charles Edward Elsmore – of Picton.
- Leah Elsie Jean Gilbert – of Whangaparāoa.
- Patricia Hayden Gribble – of Auckland.
- Colin Robert Guppy – sergeant, New Zealand Police.
- Thomas Haliburton – of Kotemaori.
- Tevita Kilifi Heimuli – constable, New Zealand Police.
- Kenneth Leslie Hill JP – of Christchurch.
- John Erua Horrell JP – of North Canterbury.
- Karl Owen Jones JP – of Karamea.
- Allan Robert Kay JP – of Dunedin.
- Edna Judith Lepper – of Havelock North.
- Mary Elizabeth Mackenzie – of Wellsford.
- Joan Meyer – of Auckland.
- The Reverend Father William George James Middleton – of Hokitika.
- Bessie Emily Priston JP – of Auckland.
- Raimapaha Rei JP – of Wanganui.
- Allan Noel Robson – of Dunedin.
- David Ernest Seath – of Auckland.
- The Reverend Mack Temara – of Whakatāne.
- Patricia Irene Wilson – of Invercargill.
- Marjorie Mary Wrigley JP – of Masterton.

== Air Force Cross (AFC) ==
- Squadron Leader (now Wing Commander) Peter Sydney Faulkner – Royal New Zealand Air Force.

== Queen's Fire Services Medal (QFSM) ==
- Brian Shields Armstrong – fire force commander, Auckland Fire Brigade, New Zealand Fire Service.
- Sidney Keith Christensen BEM – fire commander, Palmerston North Fire Brigade, New Zealand Fire Service.
- Hugh Ernest George Henderson JP – divisional officer, Auckland Fire Brigade, New Zealand Fire Service.
- Leslie Shepherd – chief fire officer, Te Puke Volunteer Fire Brigade, New Zealand Fire Service.

== Queen's Police Medal (QPM) ==
- Bruce Dunbar Read – detective chief inspector, New Zealand Police.

== Queen's Commendation for Valuable Service in the Air ==
- Flight Lieutenant Peter Graham Randerson – Royal New Zealand Air Force.
