= Ana Hato =

New Zealand singer (1907–1953)

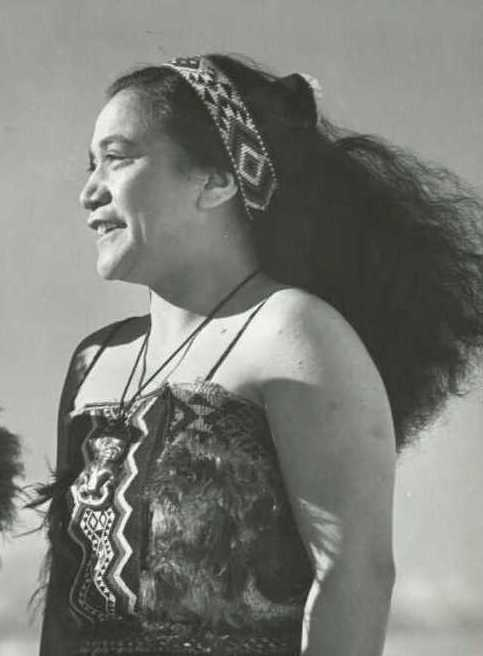
- Hato, c. 1940

Background information
- Born: 30 December 1907; Ngāpuna, New Zealand
- Died: 8 December 1953 (aged 45) Rotorua, New Zealand
- Occupation: Singer
- Years active: 1926–1950
- Label: Parlophone

Ana Matawhāura Hato (30 December 1907 – 8 December 1953) was a New Zealand singer. She and her cousin Deane Waretini, Snr. were two of the first New Zealand singers to be commercially recorded in the late 1920s, and the acoustic recordings are prized by collectors and historians. In later life, she frequently sang at public occasions and took part in some of the earliest radio broadcasts featuring Māori music.

== Early life ==
Hato was born on 30 December 1907 at Ngāpuna, a suburb of Rotorua. Her father was of Ngāti Whakaue descent, and her mother was of Tūhourangi descent. She grew up in the tourist destination of Whakarewarewa. Both her parents were singers who performed traditional Māori music. The singing classes she took at the local primary school, from Mrs Banks, the wife of the headmaster, were the only formal music lessons she ever had. Her cousin Waretini also attended these lessons, and together they sang at community gatherings, church and for tourists.

== Career ==
By the age of 16, Hato was a member of the Māori concert group run by Guide Rangi, and regularly performed solo at public occasions. She was a soprano and, although she did not read music, had precise pitch and played the ukulele. She toured New Zealand with Maggie Papakura in the early 1920s, and toured Australia as a soloist with a small concert party in 1925. By 1926, Waretini considered her the best soprano in New Zealand.

In 1927, aged 20, she performed for the Duke and Duchess of York, in the old Tūnohopū meeting house at Ōhinemutu, singing with Waretini, with pianist Te Mauri Meihana and with the Rotorua Māori Choir. The performance was recorded by technicians from the Australian branch of Parlophone Records, using small portable acoustic recording equipment. She and her cousin travelled to Sydney afterwards where further recordings were made of songs such as "Hine E Hine" and "Waiata Poi", and thousands of copies were sold in New Zealand and Australia. In total, Hato and Waretini made fourteen recordings together. Family members later said that it was unlikely Hato and Waretini received any money for their recordings, and although they became famous throughout New Zealand, Hato worked various jobs through her life including as a housemaid, cook, laundry worker and guide for European visitors.

On 30 May 1931 she married Pāhau Rāpōni, a Tūhourangi labourer, at Rotorua. He went overseas with the first Māori contingent in World War II, became a prisoner of war in Germany and died on 27 October 1942. They had no children but she adopted her niece's daughter. From 1933 she led her own concert party. She was a committed Roman Catholic and gave concerts to raise money for the restoration of St Michael's Catholic Church in Rotorua, to help Māori serving in World War II and to help other charitable organisations. She frequently sang at public occasions such as the opening of the 1ZB building in Auckland in 1941, and the opening of 1YZ radio station in Rotorua in 1949. She also took part in some of the earliest radio broadcasts featuring Māori music. It was reported that she taught Gracie Fields to sing "Now is the Hour" when Fields visited New Zealand in 1946.

In the last eight years of her life she suffered from cancer, but continued to travel and perform until she was forced to give up singing in 1950. She died in the Rotorua Public Hospital on 8 December 1953, and was buried at Whakarewarewa. For many years, her family and friends placed a memorial notice every December in the Rotorua Daily Post which said: "The melody has ended, but the memory lingers on..." In 1996, some of her recordings with Waretini were released on CD, although the original fragile recordings are still prized by collectors and historians. In March 2015, the organisers of a church fair in Wellington found a rare 1927 acoustic recording by Hato, Waretini and other local musicians, in a box of items for a jumble sale.

== Discography ==
Singles (solo)
Title	Release info	Year	Notes
"Hoki Hoki" / "Te Arawa"	Parlophone A 2800		
"Waiata Poi" (A Poi Song) / "Akoako o te Rangi (Whisper Of Heaven)	Parlophone A 2802	1927	
"In Fairyland" (A Maori Legend) / "Karo" (A Poi Song)	Parlophone A 2807	1927	
"Waiata Poi" / Te Taniwha (The Dragon), "Haka"	Parlophone AR 100	1927	
"Pokare Kare" / "Hine Ehine"	Parlophone AR 101	1927	
"Pokarekare" (The Ripple) / "Hine E Hine" (Slumber Song)	Parlophone R 3354	1927	
"Hoki Hoki Tonumai", "Poatarau Maori" / "Tahi-Nei Taru Kino", "Kutia Haka"	Parlophone R 3355	1927	
