= The Yandall Sisters =

New Zealand musical group

The Yandall Sisters were a popular New Zealand-born Samoan all-female singing group of the 1970s, who made a major contribution to music in New Zealand. The members of the group were Caroline, Mary and Adele Yandall, and later younger sister Pauline Yandall.

The four sisters were daughters to Nova Phineas and Tanuvasa James Yandall. Tanuvasa arrived in New Zealand 1946 from Samoa, bringing with him his faith, including a growing enjoyment of gospel songs which he shared with his young daughters. The Yandall sisters started entering singing competitions through Sunday school and talent quests as encouraged by their parents; which later landed Caroline, Mary, and Adele their first recordings as The Yandall Sisters in 1966.

In the early days, they recorded for Bill Sevesi's Armar label.

In 1974, their hit song "Sweet Inspiration" stayed on the NZ Top 20 singles chart for eight weeks, and has become a classic favourite in New Zealand and the Pacific Islands. The track was a cover of the song by an American group of the same name.

In 1977, the Yandall Sisters were named New Zealand Group of the Year. Popular entertainers in their own right, they provided backing vocals for hundreds of musicians and entertainers in New Zealand and Australia. These include notable showbands and singers Prince Tui Teka, Howard Morrison, Bunny Walters and John Rowles.

Mary Yandall recorded an album with Rodger Fox in 1987. She died aged 62 on 30 January 2012 at Auckland Hospital after a short illness.

In 2007, the Yandall Sisters were awarded the "Lifetime Achievement" award by the Pacific Music Awards Trust in Aotearoa in recognition of their significant contribution to Pacific Music.

== Discography ==
=== Singles ===
- (1975) "Sweet Inspiration" #8
- (1984) "Hei Konei Rā" #21 (Pātea Māori Club featuring Dalvanius and the Yandall Sisters)

== Session work ==
- Will Crummer - Shoebox Love Songs - Ode CDMANU5113 - 2011
- Space Waltz - Space Waltz - EMI HSD 1038 - 1975, (Also released on World Record Club E 3207)
- Bunny Walters - "Take The Money And Run"
- Deane Waretini - Waretini - CBS SBP 237634 - 1981

== See also ==
- Samoan New Zealander
