= Melissa Venema =

Dutch trumpeter (born 1995)

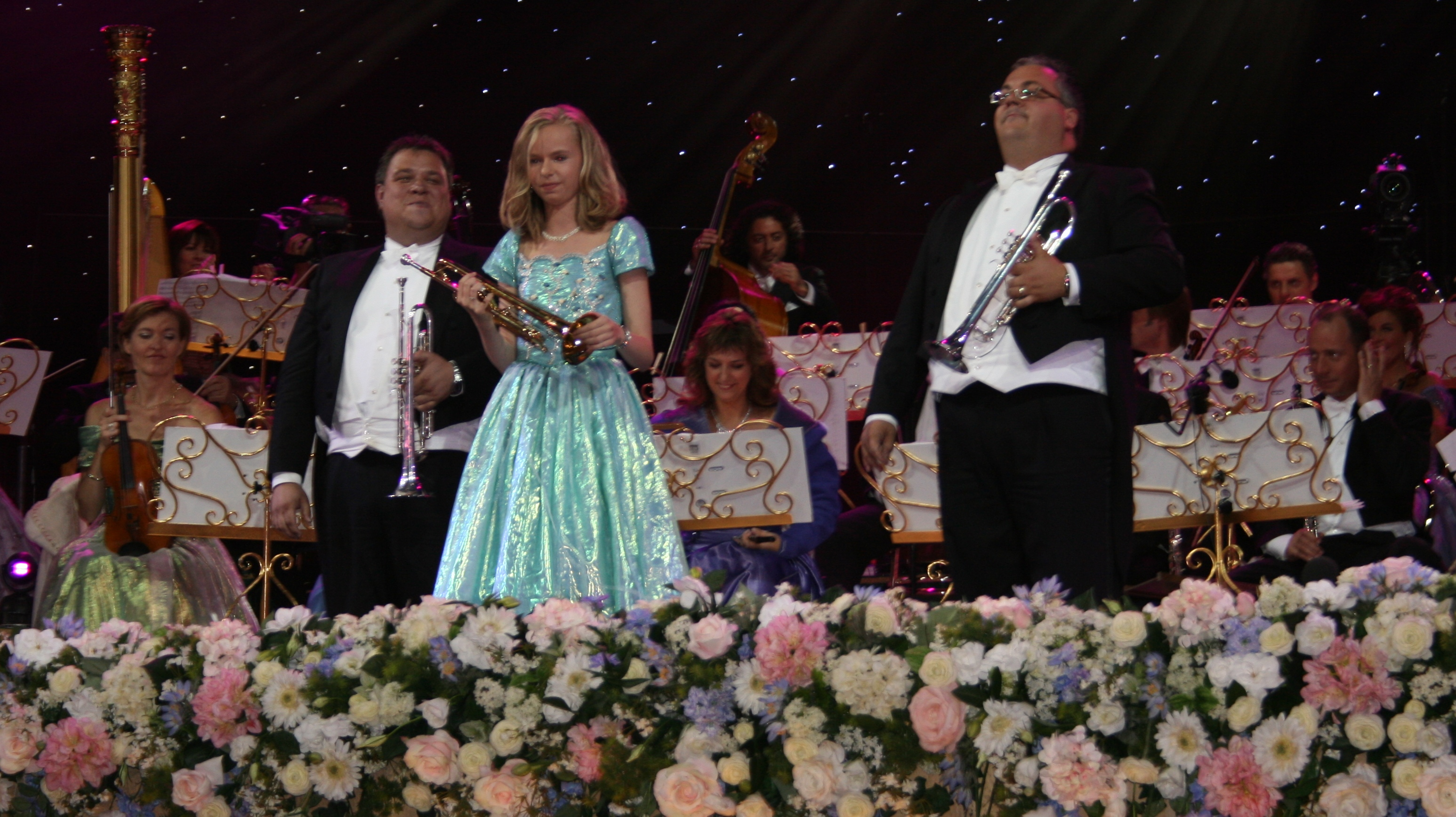
- Melissa Venema at the Vrijthof in Maastricht in 2008

Background information
- Born: April 12, 1995 (age 30); Alkmaar, Netherlands
- Instrument: Trumpet
- Years active: 2006–present
- Website: http://www.melissavenema.nl

Melissa Venema (born April 12, 1995, in Alkmaar) is a Dutch trumpeter.

== Life ==
Venema started playing recorder at age 6 and moved to trumpet by age 8. When she was 10, she auditioned successfully at the Conservatorium van Amsterdam, training under Frits Damrow, a world-famous trumpeter. She has since performed in numerous public broadcasts, including an internationally broadcast performance of Haydn's Trumpet Concerto in the Crystal Cathedral in Garden Grove, California.

Venema also plays on her own custom made Yamaha trumpet, and four other trumpets.

== Awards ==
Venema has won several awards over the years, with more recent achievements including taking third place at the Chicago International Brass Festival and several prizes in the Princess Christina Competition. In 2010, she received the Encouragement Prize of Culture of the City Zaanstad. She has also worked with the violinist André Rieu.

== Discography ==
- Melissa voor U (2006)
- Melissa in Concert (2009)
- Melissa from the Heart (2010)
- The Trumpet is My Voice (2012)
