= Now Is the Hour (TV series) =

2012 mockumentary television series

- Starring: Deane Waretini; Andrei Frolov; Orlando Stewart
- Country of origin: New Zealand
- No. of seasons: 1
- No. of episodes: 7

Production
- Running time: approx. 26 minutes
- Production company: Scottie Productions (2012)

Original release
- Network: Māori Television
- Release: August 31 – October 12, 2012

Now is the Hour is a mockumentary television series starring New Zealand singer Deane Waretini who had a #1 hit with The Bridge in 1981.

== Synopsis ==
In the series, Dean Waretini is a 65 year old taxi driver. The seven part comedy series, which is about Waretini, is a blurring of fact and fiction. Besides Waretini, it also features Orlando, the manager from Wayne Anderson - Singer of Songs, and a former Russian nuclear physicist. In a short review of the show, Paul Casserly of The New Zealand Herald said that sometimes it was hard to tell what was fact and what was fiction. It has a "road trip" theme to it. Along for the ride is Raewyn-Anne who is the founder of his fan club of 16 strong. The series follows Waretini as he moves around from Christchurch to where he started off in Rotorua with him hoping to re start his career with Orlando Stewart organizing his venues. Frolov has a job to get Waretini info physical shape while Waretini tries to teach him his song. One of the episodes features Deane and Andrei recording a song.

== Production and other info ==
The story was penned by New Zealand writer and comedian Orlando Stewart. The show consists of 7 episodes running at 26 minutes each. It made its debut on Maori Television on 10.00pm on Friday, August 31, 2012.

Andrei Frolov is a member of the Russian Cultural Centre Trust in Christchurch.

== Cast and crew ==
=== Cast ===
- Deane Waretini
- Andrei Frolov
- Orlando Stewart

=== Crew ===
- Meg Douglas - Executive producer

== Episodes ==
Now is the Hour episodes
Episode no	Air date	Brief description	Notes
Episode One	31/08/12	Waretini looking to re-launch his career teams up with Russian immigrant Andrei Frolov.	
Episode Two	07/09/12	Beginning of Waretini's comeback quest, and time to leave Christchurch	
Episode Three	14/09/12	Two gigs and 250 km to travel. Promoter feeling the pinch. Is disaster around the corner?	
Episode Four	21/09/12	Fitness workout including some boxing and singing for the Salvation Army.	
Episode Five	28/09/12	Waretini and Frolov record a new song.	
Episode Six	05/10/12	Will his gig for the troops in Waiouru happen?	
Episode Seven	12/10/12	Waretini finally meets his promoter Orlando. The comeback show could be a disaster	
