= A Tree in the Meadow =

Song
- Written: 1948
- Songwriter: Billy Reid

"A Tree in the Meadow" is a popular song. It was written by Billy Reid, and the song was published in 1948.

The songwriter, orchestra leader Billy Reid, recorded the first version in the United Kingdom, with Dorothy Squires as vocalist. It was recorded on 9 January 1948, and released by Parlophone Records as catalog number R-3092.

The most popular version of the song in the United States was recorded by Margaret Whiting with Frank De Vol orchestra on 25 May 1948, and released by Capitol Records as catalog number 15122. Whiting sang along with a recording from Europe and was not told she was being recorded due to a US musicians' strike. The record reached the Billboard charts on 9 July 1948 and lasted 23 weeks on the chart, peaking at #1.

The Monica Lewis and Ames Brothers recording was released by Decca Records as catalog number 24411. The record first reached the Billboard charts on 13 August 1948 and lasted 1 week on the chart, at #22.

The John Laurenz recording was released by Mercury Records as catalog number 5148. The record first reached the Billboard charts on 17 September 1948, and lasted 1 week on the chart, at #28.

The Joe Loss recording was released by RCA Victor Records as catalog number 20-2965. The record first reached the Billboard charts on 10 September 1948, and lasted 1 week on the chart, at #30.

Other versions were recorded by Monica Lewis and The Ames Brothers with Mary Osborne Trio, John Laurenz as well as Joe Loss and his orchestra.
