= Dorothy Squires =

Welsh singer (1915–1998)

- Born: Edna May Squires; 25 March 1915; Pontyberem, Wales
- Died: 14 April 1998 (aged 83); Llwynypia, Wales
- Occupation: Singer
- Spouse: Roger Moore (m. 1953; div. 1968)
- Musical career
- Genre: Traditional pop
- Years active: 1936–1990
- Labels: Parlophone; Columbia; Polygon; Pye Nixa; President

Dorothy Squires (born Edna May Squires; 25 March 1915 – 14 April 1998) was a Welsh singer. Her early successes were achieved with "The Gypsy", "A Tree in the Meadow" and "I'm Walking Behind You" by her partner Billy Reid, and "Say It with Flowers" written by Squires with piano accompaniment by Russ Conway. Among her later well-known recordings were versions of "Till", "My Way", and "For Once in My Life". Other notable cover songs included "A Lovely Way to Spend an Evening", "I'm in the Mood for Love", "Anytime", "If You Love Me (Really Love Me)" and "And So to Sleep Again".

In later life, Squires filed multiple frivolous lawsuits. She was banned from the High Court by 1982, and formally declared a "vexatious litigant" from 1987, requiring the court's permission to file any further cases. The legal expenses ultimately led to her bankruptcy.

== Biography ==
Born in her parents' carnival caravan in Pontyberem (about 12 miles from Llanelli), Carmarthenshire, Wales, to a steelworker, Archibald James Squires, and his wife, Emily, she wanted a piano as a child. Her mother bought her a ukulele. While working in a tin plate factory, she began to perform professionally as a singer at the age of 16 in the working men's club of Pontyberem.

=== Career ===
While working as a nurse in London, Squires sought singing jobs; she met agent Joe Kay, who got her night time work in various clubs. Squires performed at an East End club that gave her the name Dorothy, which she liked and adopted as her stage name. Squires did most of her work with the orchestra of Billy Reid, who was her partner for many years. After she joined his orchestra in 1936, he began to write songs for her to perform.

==== Billy Reid ====
After World War II, she worked on the BBC radio show Variety Bandbox, which led to her becoming the highest paid female singer in the UK at the time. Squires and Reid bought a 16-bedroom house in Bexhill on Sea, and the two recorded the original version of Reid's composition, "A Tree in the Meadow".

Her version of another Reid-penned song, "I'm Walking Behind You", was a UK chart hit for Squires It was covered by Eddie Fisher and became a No. 1 hit single in the US, and her recording of "The Gypsy" also became a No. 1 hit there after being recorded by the Ink Spots – their biggest hit. It was also a major hit for Dinah Shore.

While working with Billy Reid, Squires lived in Brixton.

By 1953 Squires was frustrated at the lack of air time she was getting on BBC radio, claiming that one exec had told her she needed to break America to raise her profile. Feeling that she would be unable to make a living from occasional TV dates, she left the UK, claiming that if she broke America, she might never return.

==== Roger Moore ====
Squires met the actor Roger Moore at one of her parties at her mansion in Old Bexley, Kent. Moore, who was 12 years her junior, later became her husband when they married in New Jersey on 6 July 1953. She later said, "it started with a squabble, then he carried me off to bed." She introduced him to various people in the Hollywood film industry. As his career took off, hers started to slide. Their marriage lasted until 1961, when Moore left her. He was unable to marry again legally until Squires agreed to a divorce in 1968 – the day on which Squires was convicted of drunk driving.

Returning to the UK, Squires had a career revival in the late 1960s at the age of 55 with a set of three singles that made the UK Singles Chart, including a cover of "My Way". New albums and concerts followed including concerts at the London Palladium, Royal Albert Hall and the Theatre Royal, Drury Lane. Decca Records issued a double album of her Palladium concert.

=== Later life ===
In 1971, she filed the first of 30 court cases over the next 15 years. In 1971, she successfully sued the News of the World over the story "When Love Turned Sour", and was awarded £4,000. In 1972, she took out a libel action against the actor Kenneth More, who had mistakenly referred to Roger Moore's girlfriend Luisa Mattioli as Moore's "wife" when he was still legally married to Squires. Michael Havers acted for Kenneth More, who won the case. In 1973, she was charged with high kicking a taxi driver who tried to throw her out of his cab. She was also one of several artists charged with bribing a BBC radio producer as part of a scheme to make him play her records; the case was dropped.

In 1974, her Bexley mansion burned down, from which she escaped with her dog and all her love letters from Roger Moore. She then moved into a house in Bray next to the River Thames, which flooded three weeks later.

By 1982, she had been banned from the High Court, having spent much of her fortune on legal fees. Her numerous lawsuits caused the High Court on 5 March 1987 to declare her a "vexatious litigant", preventing her from commencing any further legal actions without the permission of the Court. In 1988, following bankruptcy proceedings, she lost her home in Bray, to which she returned the following night to recover her love letters from Moore. Her last concert was in 1990, to pay her Community Charge.

Squires was provided with a home in Trebanog, Rhondda, South Wales, by a fan, Esme Coles. Squires retired there becoming a recluse, and died in 1998 of lung cancer, aged 83, at Llwynypia Hospital, Rhondda. Her remains are interred in a family plot in Streatham Park Cemetery, south London.

== Legacy ==
On 20 May 2013, a commemorative blue plaque was unveiled outside Aston House on New Road in Llanelli, where Squires and her family took up residence in her fifteenth year. Financed by Roger Moore, the plaque had been created 18 months previously. The unveiling was performed by Ruth Madoc, who was portraying the older Dorothy Squires in the play, Say It with Flowers, by Meic Povey and Johnny Tudor. Following its premiere engagement at the Sherman Cymru Theatre, Cardiff, in 2013, the play toured across Wales. A previous staged tribute to her, Dorothy Squires: Mrs Roger Moore, written by Richard Stirling and starring Al Pillay in the title role, premiered at the White Bear Theatre in London on 6 June 2012, with a subsequent engagement at the Edinburgh Festival Fringe in August that year. Welsh singer-songwriter Christopher Rees wrote a tribute song to Dorothy Squires, "Alright Squires", which appeared on his 2013 album Stand Fast.

== Hit singles ==
- "I'm Walking Behind You" (1953) – UK No. 12
- "Say It with Flowers" (1961) – UK No. 23 (with Russ Conway)
- "For Once in My Life" (1969) – UK No. 24
- "Till" (1970) – UK No. 25
- "My Way" (1970) – UK No. 25

== Filmography ==
- Saturday Night Revue (1937)
- Stars in Your Eyes (1956)
