= Emily Carpenter =

Emily Elizabeth Carpenter CMG (20 January 1917 – 14 March 1991) was a New Zealand university tutor in home science, adult educationalist and consumer advocate. She was born in Scargill, North Canterbury, New Zealand, on 20 January 1917.

In the 1985 New Year Honours, Carpenter was appointed a Companion of the Order of St Michael and St George, for services to the Consumer Council and home science.
