= Now Is the Hour (song) =

Popular song from the early 20th century

Song by Various
- Language: Māori, English
- Released: 1913 (as "Swiss Cradle Song")
- Recorded: 1927 (Ana Hato), 1945 (Gracie Fields), and others
- Genre: Popular, Traditional
- Label: Various
- Songwriters: Clement Scott (music), Maewa Kaihau, Dorothy Stewart (arrangement and lyrics)
- Composer: Clement Scott (music)
- Lyricists: Maewa Kaihau, Dorothy Stewart, others

"Now Is the Hour" (Māori: Pō Atarau) is a popular song from the early 20th century. Often erroneously described as a traditional Māori song, its creation is usually credited to several people, including Clement Scott's music and Maewa Kaihau and Dorothy Stewart (arrangement and lyrics).

== History ==
The tune of the song first became known in 1913 when it was published by W.H. Paling and Co as a piano variations piece in Australia, called "Swiss Cradle Song" and credited to "Clement Scott". Some sources say that after a tour of New Zealand, the British music critic and travel writer Clement Scott wrote the tune to the "Swiss Cradle Song". However, the family members of an Australian, Albert Saunders, have long claimed that the "Clement Scott" who wrote the tune is a pseudonym for Saunders. Australian composer Clarence Elkin also claimed to be the writer. Although a court case shortly after Saunders' death was inconclusive as to authorship, his son has provided journalists with handwritten compositions written by Saunders that were subsequently published by W.H. Paling and Co under the name of "Clement Scott". New Zealand journalist Max Cryer concluded in 2020 that: "Scott was really Albert Saunders", and noted that the National Library of Australia credits Saunders as the composer of the song.

The piece consisted of eight variations to the main 16-bar theme. Paling sold 130,000 copies of "Swiss Cradle Song". Māori words were added around 1915 and the tune was slightly changed. It became known as "Po Atarau" and was used as a farewell to Māori soldiers going to the First World War. After this, some white New Zealanders "mistakenly thought [the song was] an old Maori folksong". One claim attributes the first words to two Māori groups of sheep shearers, the Grace and Awatere families, of Tuparoa.

In 1920, Maewa Kaihau (friend to Ramai Hayward) wrote an opening verse in English as "This is the hour..." for her daughter who had become attached to a member of a visiting royal party, who was shortly to leave. She also modified the "Po Atarau" tune and added another Māori translation. When it became popular, Maewa Kaihau claimed the words and tune as her own work, but then Paling asserted their copyright for the tune. Nevertheless, Maewa Kaihau's words were copyrighted in 1928. In 1935, Kaihau modified the "Po Atarau" version again to become the "Haere Ra Waltz Song", which was performed as the last waltz at dances and farewells.

The song was first recorded by Ana Hato in 1927, with minor variations in the lyrics. English singer Gracie Fields learnt "Haere Ra" on a visit to New Zealand in 1945 in Rotorua. While travelling in her car, her driver taught her a version of it and it became a world-wide hit in 1948. Fields's manager, Dorothy Stewart, is credited with amending the opening line to "Now is the Hour", and with adding another verse.

The tune, commonly named "Māori" in hymnals, is also used with the lyrics "Search Me, O God" by J. Edwin Orr. Newcastle United fans sang the song in the last minutes of the 1955 FA Cup Final.

== Other versions ==
Connie Francis included the song on her 1959 British themed album called My Thanks to You.

New Zealand Maori singers Ken Kincaid and Deane Waretini have both recorded versions of the song. The version by Kincaid appears on the Mauri Hikitia album, and was also the B side of his single. The version by Waretini is on his Now is the Hour album released in 2012, and he was also the subject of a television series titled Now Is the Hour on Māori Television about his career.

The song achieved world-wide popularity in 1948, when no less than seven recordings of the song reached the Billboard charts in the USA. These were by Bing Crosby (recorded November 8, 1947 with the Ken Darby Choir and Instrumental Group, reaching No. 1 for three weeks during 23 weeks on the charts; it was also Crosby's final No. 1 hit), Margaret Whiting (No. 2), Gracie Fields (No. 3), Buddy Clark (No. 6), Eddy Howard (No. 8), Kate Smith (No. 12), and Charlie Spivak (No. 14).

Numerous other artists have subsequently recorded the song, including Frank Sinatra, Gale Storm, Burl Ives, Connie Francis and the Everly Brothers. Hayley Westenra, a soprano from New Zealand, sang the song at the closing of the 2011 Rugby World Cup. The 1975 covered the song (produced by Grammy winner Jack Antonoff) as part of The New Look soundtrack. In 1997, it was also performed by military bands as British representatives were departing from Hong Kong on HMY Britannia following the handover ceremony that ended 156 years of British rule in Hong Kong.

A version sung by the Turakina Māori Girls' College Choir recorded by Keith and Nancy Southern for Wellington record company Viking Seven Seas was featured in the 2026 film Project Hail Mary as handpicked from its music supervisor Kier Lehman.

== Lyrics ==
Māori version
Pō atarau e moea iho nei
E haere ana koe ki pāmamao
Haere rā ka hoki mai anō
Ki i te tau e tangi atu nei

Translation
On a moonlit night, I see in a dream
You going away to a distant land
Farewell, but return again
To your loved one, weeping here

English version

Now is the hour for me to say goodbye
Soon you'll be sailing far across the sea
While you're away oh please remember me
When you return you'll find me waiting here
