= Billy Reid (British songwriter) =

English composer (1902–1974)

- Born: William Gordon Reid; 19 September 1902; Southampton, England
- Died: 12 December 1974 (aged 72) Southampton, England
- Genres: Traditional pop
- Occupations: Songwriter, bandleader, musician
- Instruments: Piano, accordion
- Years active: 1920s–1956

William Gordon Reid (19 September 1902 – 12 December 1974) was an English songwriter, bandleader, pianist and accordionist. He was the first British songwriter to reach the top of the US music chart, with The Ink Spots' 1946 recording of "The Gypsy", and was known for his close association with the singer Dorothy Squires, for whom he wrote that and many other songs.

== Biography ==
Born in Coronation Terrace, Southampton, England, Reid worked as a riveter in the docks in the city. He taught himself the piano and piano accordion, and played in local clubs before becoming a professional musician and forming the Ariste Dance Orchestra. He played accordion in the Noël Coward show Bitter Sweet, and his band played each week on a Radio Luxembourg programme, Stars of Luxembourg. In the early 1930s, he formed a tango band with violinist Eugene Pini, and led the London Piano-Accordeon Band, which became popular and recorded extensively through the 1930s for the Regal Zonophone and Decca labels, sometimes billed simply as Billy Reid and His Accordion Band.

In 1938, he successfully auditioned a young Welsh singer, Dorothy Squires. He also started to have some success with his own songwriting, and his tune "Out of the Blue" became popular with RAF bands during the Second World War. Though Reid was married, he and Squires established a close personal as well as professional relationship, and Reid took the opportunity to write songs especially for her. His first big hit was "The Gypsy", first recorded by Squires in 1945, though its greatest success came in the version by The Ink Spots which topped the US music chart – the first time this had been achieved by a British songwriter. His success as a British songwriter in reaching the top of the U.S. chart several times was unequalled until the rise of The Beatles in the 1960s.

Reid continued to write for Squires, and many of his songs were recorded by other singers. Their successes included "Coming Home" (1945), a song also recorded by Vera Lynn; "It's a Pity to Say Goodnight", also recorded by June Christy; and "Bridge of Sighs", a British hit for David Whitfield. He had further gold discs in the United States with "A Tree in the Meadow", recorded by Margaret Whiting, and "I'm Walking Behind You", a British hit for Dorothy Squires in 1953, which was then recorded by Eddie Fisher. His songs were also recorded by Frank Sinatra, Ella Fitzgerald, Peggy Lee, Al Martino and Louis Armstrong, among others.

His relationship with Dorothy Squires ended in 1951, after an altercation in the bar of a theatre in Llanelli that they jointly owned, and was followed by legal actions between the pair. In 1956, Reid was declared bankrupt, and he left the music business. He remarried, to singer Jane Gordon, and retired to the Isle of Wight.

He died from kidney disease in 1974, aged 72. Shortly after his death, Dorothy Squires presented a tribute to her former partner at the London Palladium. In 2002, a plaque remembering Reid was unveiled by entertainer Danny La Rue at the site of the Southampton Hippodrome, where Reid had performed many times.
