= Albert Bokhare Saunders =

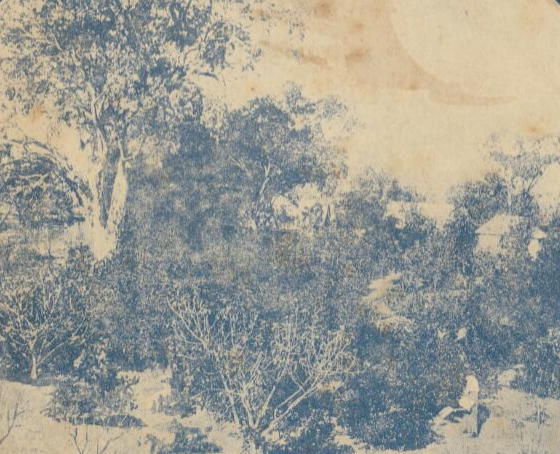
- Childhood home Wirra Warra Station

Background information
- Born: 22 July 1880; Brewarrina, New South Wales, Australia
- Died: 10 July 1946
- Occupation: Composer/Musician
- Years active: 1900–1940

Albert Bokhare Saunders (1880–1946) was a successful and prolific composer of romantic and light classical music. He worked as an arranger for Sydney music publisher W.H. Palings. He worked under various pseudonyms including Albert Earl and Albert Trelba but is most widely known as Clement Scott.

Saunders was born in Brewarrina, rural New South Wales. He has been credited as composer of "Swiss Cradle Song", possibly collected from the Māori folk song "Po Ata Rau" and given English language lyrics as "Now is the Hour", sung by departing troops in The Great War and recalled by patriotic New Zealanders. During his life, he successfully sued a Sydney entertainment producer for breach of copyright, but his widow was unsuccessful making the same claim on Palings for the famous cradle song. The song was an international hit.

On at least one occasion, Saunders acted as bandmaster for a group playing brass.

Several solo piano editions of Saunder's popular "Comet March" are preserved in Australian libraries. The original 1910 edition for trio of piano, cornet and violin seems to have been lost, yet the piece was still being orchestrated by amateurs twenty years later.

Roguish Eyes Mazurka (1920)
MIDI rendition

Australian Cradle Song (1919)
MIDI rendition)

'True Blue' Foxtrot 1920 by Albert Saunders 1880-1946

== Works ==
=== Orchestrated works ===
Saunders composed about three hundred pieces during his lifetime, of which over two hundred are preserved in Australian libraries. His later works show a capacity for originality and counterpoint. These pieces of ensemble music are orchestrated for trio of violin, cornet and piano and sometimes for quartette including double bass.

- 1913 Swiss Cradle Song
- 1919 Cuddles
- 1919 Wirra Warra Schottische
- Devotion Waltz
- Alpine Violets
- Loves Melody
- 1920 Love's Melody
- Swiss Scenes
- Australian Cradle Song (trio for piano, cornet, violin)

=== Other works ===
- Serbian Cradle Song
- Irish Cradle Song
- Prince of Diggers
- "Go ahead!" march for piano
- Love's melody : a romance for the piano
- Devotion waltz
- 1919 Cuddles
- 1910 Wandering thoughts : tone poem for piano
- 1910 Wirra warra schottische
- St. Michaels : fox-trot
- Happy Moments : eight easy pieces for little fingers
- Comet March
- Waratah : pianoforte solo
- Boronia
- Flannel Flowers
- Poppies Gavotte: easy piano solo without octaves
- Joyful Nights Waltz
- Kitchener March
- Scarf Dance
- Wattle Blossoms
- (disputed) 1913 Swiss Cradle Song
- (attributed) Tiny Tunes For Wee Australians
