= Deane Waretini =

New Zealand musician

- Born: c. 1946
- Origin: New Zealand
- Genres: Pop, Country
- Occupations: Singer, business owner
- Years active: 1970s to present
- Labels: Tony McCarthy Recordings, CBS, Ode Records

Deane Waretini (born c. 1946) is a musician from New Zealand. He had a #1 chart hit in 1981 with the song "The Bridge", a Māori language song set to Nini Rosso's tune "Il Silenzio". He is also the son of a historically significant Maori baritone singer and recording artist. In later years, Waretini was featured in a New Zealand television production that was built around him.

== Background ==
He was born Adrian Waretini in Rotorua in 1946, the youngest son of famed Maori singer Deane Waretini Snr. Waretini really only found out about his father's singing when he was aged about 12. It wasn't until years later that he knew about his father having recorded on to record. To him, his father just worked as a laborer and would sing lullabies. Music wasn't really a big thing in their home in Horohoro. By the time he was in his late teens he had moved from Rotorua to Christchurch and was working as a labourer. It was in 1967 that his father died. Young Waretini was 21 at this time. It wasn't until about two years after his father's death that he would actually get to hold one of his records in his hands.

== Career ==
At age 14, and having learnt a few chords on the guitar, and apparently enough to impress the opposite sex, he tried out for a band. After being made to realise that he didn't own a guitar, the option left was singing. Having learnt a few songs from the radio, he joined a local group called the Tremloes. After 18 months of rehearsing, the band got their chance to play at a venue called the Ritz. With a capability to handle 600 patrons, the Ritz was nearly empty. On their debut there, the band were taken off stage. While the other members were upset over this action, Waretini, apparently philosophical about the event, was happy just to have played there. After that, Waretini was finding work and doing gigs where the opportunity arose.

By 1967 he was the father of two children. A day short of his 21st birthday, he learnt that his father had died. He was in Christchurch at this time. After the funeral of his father, Waretini was taken under the wing of his cousin George Tait, a Te Arawa elder. Tait also became his manager. In 1970, Tait flew Waretini to Australia, and financed the trip himself from his war pension income. While Waretini was there, he came across Wi Wharekura who had previously been a musician with the Howard Morrison Quartet. After learning a few things about the business, Waretini came back and joined the roster of promoter Joe Brown. Waretini really began his professional career in the early 1970s. Around that time he appeared as a finalist in Studio One's New Faces Contest. Also around that time, he cut his first record "Troubles In My Life". The debut single was released on the Tony McCarthy Recordings label, a small label that previously had released a recording by Mahia Blackmore.

In June 1973, he entered a contest to pick the song for the 1974 Commonwealth Games. The song "Baby I'm Leaving" was a Mark Anthony composition. Other artists in the competition were The Rumour with "Quiet Song", an Anderson & Wise composition, and "Join Together", by Steve Allen. Allen's song was the winner. In an earlier heat, another singer with the same surname, Andy Waretini had entered with the song "Last Year's Summer".

=== "The Bridge" ===
The Bridge was originally self-released before CBS picked it up. After that it became the first no 1 song to be sung in Maori language. It stayed at the top of the charts for two weeks.

It was recorded in a garage in the Auckland suburb of Henderson. Waretini didn't have money to pay the musicians so he paid them in Kentucky Fried Chicken. Spending $96 to get a pile of the singles produced, he sent some to Radio 1ZB, then bombarded them with play requests. He managed to get it played at Auckland's Civic Theatre as part of their intermission music. He also recruited a news paper boy to sell copies to passing people for 50 cents each. This soon resulted in people going into record shops looking for it. Not long afterwards, CBS wanted to put it out. On 3 April 1981, the song pushed John Lennon's Woman from the number 1 spot. It also reached no 7 in Australia.

For his efforts he received $27,000 from CBS and surrendered the rights to the song.

=== Post "The Bridge" ===
In 1981, along with Ken Kincaid, the Lightwood family, and Rhonda, he appeared on the Mauri Hikitia album, which was in support of the Mt. Smart Stadium project. In 1984, he released the single "Te ariki, Oh Lord". An article about the single called "Deane needs a hit to bridge over his debts" appeared in the 22 February edition of the Auckland Star.

In 2012, Waretini was the subject of a seven-part television series called Now is the Hour, shown on Maori television. Also in 2012, his album Now is the Hour spent 2 weeks in the New Zealand charts and peaked at no 25.

=== Song For Anna ===
At some stage he recorded a song called "Song For Anna", which was a tribute to victims of domestic violence who have died as a result of the act.

== Discography ==
Singles
Title	Release info	Year	Notes
"Trouble In My Life" / "The Long Road"	Tony McCarthy Recordings tm 4	1972	
"Melody Butterfly" / "Trouble In My Life"	Tony McCarthy Recordings tm 6	1973	
"The Bridge / "Luckenback Texas"	Innovation INN 009	1980	Produced by Allan Witana
"The Bridge" / "Luckenback Texas"	CBS BA 222767	1980	
"Growing Old" / "All Those Nights"	CBS BA 222721	1980	
"Ethos" / "Po Ata Rau"	CBS BA 222800	1981	
"Hope" / "Rock And Roll Days"	CBS BA 222 942	1982	Produced by Kevin Furey; Musical direction by Stanley Jackson
"Te Ariki" (Oh Lord) / "Rock 'N' Roll Days"	RCA Victor 104267	1984	Arranged by James Tawhi
"Tarawera eruption 86" / "Born Free"	Parker's Music World PMW 1016	1986	Side 1 with Putiputi Tonihi
"Te Tangi Ote Maori" / "Thoughts"	Mauri DW 1		Credited to Treasures with Deane Waretini

Albums
Title	Release info	Year	F	Notes
Waretini	CBS SBP 237634	1981	LP	The Yandall Sisters background vocals
Waretini and Friends		200?	CD	Self-released
Now is the Hour	Ode Records CD MANU 5145	2012	CD	Distributed by DRM

Various artist compilation appearances
Title	Release info	Year	Track(s)	F	Notes
The Mauri Hikitia	Epic ELPS 4192 (CBS)	1981	"Now Is The Hour" (trad), "All Those Nights", "Growing Old"	LP	
25 Years Of Kiwi Pop	EMI 435040 2	1990	"The Bridge"	CD	
Rucks, Tries & Choruses	EMI 50999 6790752 6	2011	"Rugby World Cup"	CD	
Ten Guitars	Universal Music	2009	"The Bridge"	CD	
Waiata : Maori Showbands, Balladeers & Pop Stars	His Master's Voice – 50999 6802952; EMI – 50999 6802952 4	2011	"The Bridge" (Unreleased Alternative Version)	CD	
Pohutukawas & Pavlova (60 Years of Kiwi Christmas Songs)	Frenzy Music	2012	"A Merry Christmas"	CD	
Nature's Best: 40 NZ Number Ones, 1970–2013	Sony 02239	2013	"The Bridge"	CD	
Aotearoa: The Very Best Of Our Music	Sony	2014	"The Bridge"	CD	Appears on DISC RUA 1975–1993
Waiata 2 Maori Showbands, Balladeers & Pop Stars	EMI	2013	"The Wonder Of You"	CD	Appears on Disc 1

== Television ==
List
Title	Role	Director / Producer	Year	Notes #
New Faces	Himself		c 1972	
Studio One	Himself		1973	Sings "Baby I'm Leaving"
Kiri Maori	Himself		2000	TV special feat Kiri Te Kanawa
Now is the Hour, Episode 1	Himself	Megan Douglas (prod.)	2012	
Now is the Hour, Episode 2	Himself	Megan Douglas (prod.)	2012	
Now is the Hour, Episode 3	Himself	Megan Douglas (prod.)	2012	
Now is the Hour, Episode 4	Himself	Megan Douglas (prod.)	2012	
Now is the Hour, Episode 5	Himself	Megan Douglas (prod.)	2012	
Now is the Hour, Episode 6	Himself	Megan Douglas (prod.)	2012	
Now is the Hour, Episode 7	Himself	Megan Douglas (prod.)	2012	
