= Nini Rosso =

Italian trumpeter and composer (1926–1994)

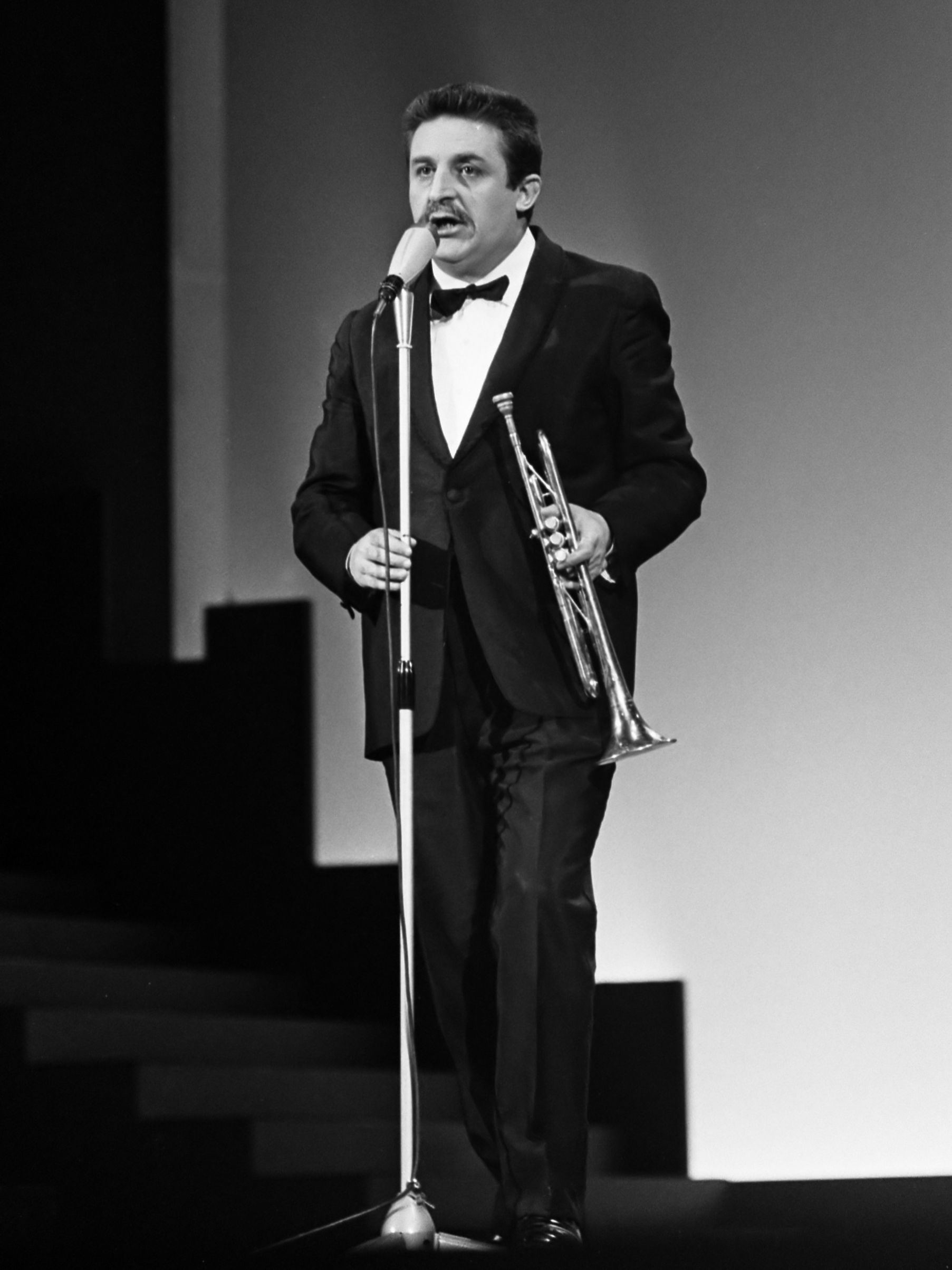
- Nini Rosso in 1969

Background information
- Born: Raffaele Celeste Rosso; 19 September 1926; Turin, Kingdom of Italy
- Died: 5 October 1994 (aged 68) Rome, Italy
- Genres: Light music; jazz
- Occupations: Musician; composer; singer
- Instruments: Vocals; trumpet
- Years active: 1948 – 1994
- Label: Durium

Raffaele Celeste "Nini" Rosso (19 September 1926 – 5 October 1994) was an Italian jazz trumpeter and composer.

== Biography ==
Rosso was born in Turin, Italy. His parents attempted to send him to university, but at 19 he chose the trumpet over academia and left home. He was a partisan during the World War II Liberation from Nazist and Fascist occupation, and operated in Maira Valley with Giorgio Bocca and Detto Dalmastro, partisan commander of the anti-fascist brigade Giustizia e Libertà attached to the Partito d'Azione of northern Italy.

After his employment in a nightclub was terminated by the police, he returned home, but soon after departed again to relaunch his career. He soon became one of the best-known jazz trumpeters in Italy, reaching the crest of his popularity in the 1960s. He became known in the UK in 1962 when his recording of "Concerto disperato" was covered by Ken Thorne and his Orchestra and became a hit under the title "The Theme from The Legion's Last Patrol". Rosso's original was quickly released on the Durium label and also made the charts, but was less successful than the cover. His 1965 worldwide hit "Il Silenzio" went to number 1 in Italy, Germany, Austria, and Switzerland, and sold over five million copies by the end of 1967. In the US, it peaked in November 1965 at position 32 on the Billboard Chart. It was awarded a gold disc. He also acted in the 1960s.

Rosso died of lung cancer in Rome in 1994, at the age of 68. He was buried at the local Cimitero Flaminio.
