= The Bridge (Deane Waretini song) =

Single by Deane Waretini with the Rising Stars
- A-side: "The Bridge"
- B-side: "Luckenback Texas"
- Label: CBS
- Songwriters: Nini Rosso, George Tait

"The Bridge" was a #1 chart hit in 1981 for New Zealand singer Deane Waretini and his backing group The Rising Stars. It was the first Māori language song to reach the number one spot in New Zealand. It was self-released and promoted before being picked up by CBS.

== Background ==
"The Bridge" was sung in Māori language, and set to Nini Rosso's tune "Il Silenzio". The words were written by Waretini's cousin, George Tait, a Te Arawa elder. It pushed John Lennon off the charts when it climbed to the top.

"The Bridge" was originally independently and self-released, and was not picked up by CBS until later. After that it became the first number 1 song to be sung in the Māori language. It stayed at the top of the charts for two weeks.

The song centres around the construction of the Mangere Bridge. Its lyrics refer to the linking of two cultures in New Zealand, Māori and Pakeha.

== Making the record ==
=== Recording ===
The song was recorded in the Auckland suburb of Henderson. The session took place in a garage studio that belonged to a country singer. The backing ensemble included musicians from the Blind Institute. The backing group, The Rising Suns, was formerly called The Radars. The trumpet player was Kevin Furey, formerly of Quincy Conserve. Waretini paid the musicians in Kentucky Fried Chicken. "We recorded it just as we played it in the hotels, with heart and soul and feel," he said.

=== Production and promotion ===
Waretini used a tactic first employed by Gary Havoc & The Hurricanes of self-financing a record. He had a pile of the singles produced, which cost him $96. Some were sent to Radio 1ZB. He then bombarded them with play requests. He also managed to get it played at intermission time at Auckland's Civic Theatre. Another tactic was recruiting a newspaper boy to sell copies to passing people for 50 cents apiece. (His backing band, The Rising Stars, two years later in 1983 would use the same approach in promoting a single.)

"The Bridge" was produced by Allan Witana, and originally released on the Innovations label. A short time later, people were going into record shops looking for "The Bridge". Not long afterwards, CBS sought the single.

On 3 April 1981, the song went to No. 1, pushing John Lennon's "Woman" from the top spot. It also reached No. 7 in Australia.

Waretini received $27,000 from CBS and gave up his rights to the song.

== Other versions ==
=== Alternative version ===
An unreleased alternative version by Waretini appears on the Waiata Maori Showbands, Balladeers & Pop Stars compilation that was released by His Master's Voice and EMI in 2011.

=== Parody version ===
In 1981, a parody ("The Fridge") recorded by Kevin Blackatini and the Frigids, was released on the RTC label. Kevin Blackatini was actually Radio Hauraki DJ Kevin Black.

== Chart progress ==
New Zealand (R.I.A.N.Z.) weekly single chartsChart position history of "The Bridge", from week of March 8, 1981 to week of May 3, 1981
WK	TW	LW	TI	No. 1 song
March 8, 1981	16	21	6	"Woman" by John Lennon
March 15, 1981	13	16	7	"Woman" by John Lennon
March 22, 1981	6	13	8	"Woman" by John Lennon
March 29, 1981	5	6	9	"Woman" by John Lennon
April 5, 1981	1	5	10	"The Bridge" by Deane Waretini
April 12, 1981	2	1	11	"Counting The Beat" by The Swingers
April 19, 1981	1	2	12	"The Bridge" by Deane Waretini
April 26, 1981	1	1	13	"The Bridge" by Deane Waretini
May 3, 1981	2	1	14	"Counting The Beat" by The Swingers

== Releases ==
Single releases
Title	Release info	Year	Notes
"The Bridge" / "Luckenback Texas"	Innovation INN 009	1980	Produced by Allan Witana; New Zealand release
"The Bridge" / "Luckenback Texas"	CBS BA 222767	1980	New Zealand release

"The Bridge" in compilations
Title	Release info	Year	Track(s)	Notes
Waiata Maori Showbands, Balladeers & Pop Stars	His Master's Voice – 50999 6802952; EMI – 50999 6802952 4	2011	"The Bridge" (Unreleased Alternative Version)	
Nature's Best: 40 NZ Number Ones, 1970-2013	Sony Music 02239	2013	"The Bridge"	
Aotearoa: The Very Best Of Our Music		2014	"The Bridge"	Appears on DISC RUA 1975-1993
