= 20 Studio One Hits =

Compilation album by Various Artists
- Released: 1972

20 Studio One Hits is a compilation album of New Zealand and New Zealand based artists culled from the Studio One television series on the N.Z.B.C. It was released in 1972 and followed up by 20 Studio One Hits Volume 2 the following year. The albums are representative of the televised Studio One talent quests. Some of the songs that appeared on the album went on to become hits in Australasia. The records which were released on the Music for Leisure label are a historical account of the Studio One talent quests.

== Background ==
The twenty songs on the album were selected from over 2,000 original songs were performed on the Studio One television program. The Studio One TV program was hot property for N.Z.B.C and a lot of emphasis was put on the program instead of the Loxene Awards. In 1972, Polygram, the parent company of Music for Leisure and His Master's Voice sold 55,000 copies of the first album in their joint sales venture. The second release, Vol 2 was produced by Christopher Bourn.

== 20 Studio One Hits ==
In March 1972, Bobby Davis's composition "Maybe" was accepted for the Studio One series. Former Dunedin bank clerk, Craig Scott had already released about 8 singles by the time his song "Day" appeared on the album. One of the entries was a group called January who was made up of two brothers, Dale and Craig Wrightson. Twice they were finalists on the televised talent competition. Their song "Thinking Of You" ended up on the album. Nash Chase's "Anderson and Wise" did well, reaching the finals of the contest, and ending up on the album. It also charted locally around New Zealand. The first place winner of the songwriting contest was "Don't let me lose you" composed by Dave Jordan and sing by Ray Woolf.

=== Track listing ===
20 Studio One HitsMusic for Leisure 440
No	Artist	Title	Time
A1	Headband	"Love Is Bigger Than The Whole Wide World"	
A2	Eliza Keil	"Everyday Is Sunday"	
A3	Craig Scott	"Day"	
A4	January	"Thinking Of Her In The Morning"	
A5	Suzanne	"Sunshine Through A Prism"	
A6	Ray Woolf	"Don't Let Me Lose You"	
A7	Yolande Gibson	"Chanson De La Ronde"	
A8	Jay 'N Bee	Maybe	
A9	The Chapta	"Show The World"	
A10	Shade Smith	"Life Of A Story"	
B1	The Rumour	"Holy Morning"	
B2	Lutha	"I Only Want To Be with You"	
B3	Suzanne	"Thought He Was A Friend Of Mine"	
B4	Nash Chase	"Anderson & Wise"	
B5	Yolande Gibson	"Now You're Gone"	
B6	Vaughan Lawrence	"Take What You Can"	
B7	Ray Woolf	"Is There Anybody Here"	
B8	Bobby Davis	"Sing To Yourself"	
B9	Carol Thomas	"This Time I Know"	
B10	Toni Williams	"Tellabout"	

== 20 Studio One Hits Vol 2 ==
The second volume was released in 1973. The songs were a result of the Studio One competition that year.

In June 1973, Deane Waretini entered into the Studio One contest to pick the song for the 1974 Commonwealth games. The song "Baby I'm Leaving" was a Mark Anthony composition. In an earlier heat, another singer with the same surname, Andy Waretini had entered with the song "Last Year's Summer". It was reported in the 9 December 1972 issue of The New Zealand Herald, that promoter Philip Warren who had spotted Andy Waretini on the New faces contest had booked him for the summer period to appear at selected holiday centers with British entertainer David Whitfield. He also appeared on the TV show Six of the Best in early 1973. Andy Waretini's song was the one that ended up on the album.

Larry Killip was a musician was once in Auckland 1960s band, The Zarks and had released some singles in the 1970s. He was a Studio One contestant, and as a result his song, which is now considered a classic in New Zealand, ended up on the album. Another Studio One contest entry, "Dance To My Tune" by Lindsay Marks ended up on the album.

Other artists in the competition were The Rumour with "Quiet Song", an Anderson and Wise composition, and "Join Together", by Steve Allen. Allen's song was the winner, "A Quiet Song" by The Rumour ended up on the album but the Steve Allen song on the album was "More than yesterday".

Kamahl's "The Boy From Dundee", was the winner of the second songwriting section of the "Studio one" competition.

=== Track listing ===
20 Studio One HitsMusic for Leisure ST1
No	Artist	Title	Time
A1	Shona Laing	"Show Your Love"	
A2	Ray Columbus	"Computer Dater"	
A3	Link	"Only Time Could Let Us Know"	
A4	Andy Waretini	"Last Year's Summer"	
A5	The Rumour	"A Quiet Song"	
A6	Ken Lemon	"Hard Lines Son"	
A7	Alec Wishart & The Society Jazzmen	"Grandad's Piano"	
A8	Link	"Highway Driver"	
A9	Lindsay Marks	"Dance To My Tune"	
A10	Ebony	"The Fool"	
B1	Kamahl	"Boy From Dundee"	
B2	Steve Allen	"More Than Yesterday"	
B3	Anna Leah	"The Love Bug"	
B4	Bunny Walters	"Natural Man"	
B5	Kilip	"Country Spring"	
B6	Shona Laing	"If Only"	
B7	Steve Gilpin	Steve Gilpin Knowing	
B8	Desna Sisarich	"Take My Life"	
B9	Ray Woolf and Borkum Riff	"Night Flower"	
B10	Craig Scott	"It's So Easy"	
