= List of Cook Islanders =

The following are islanders from the Cook Islands:

== Entertainers and musicians ==
- Will Crummer, musician
- Sonny Terei, musician
- Calum Hood, musician
- Sam V, singer, songwriter
- James Tito, actor, musician
- James Maeva, actor, consultant

== Politicians ==
- Inatio Akaruru, Cook Islands politician. Former Cabinet Minister and Deputy Prime Minister
- Albert Henry, former Premier of the Cook Islands
- Geoffrey Henry, Cook Islands politician
- Robert Woonton, former Prime Minister of the Cook Islands

== Sports ==
- Rourururoa Une (living), footballer
- Margharet Matenga, netball player

== Other ==
- Jacqueline Evans, environmentalist
- Johnny Frisbie, writer
- Vereara Maeva-Taripo, textile artist, political activist, and composer
