= Anderson and Wise (musical duo) =

New Zealand musical duo

- Origin: Wellington, New Zealand
- Genres: Pop, rock
- Years active: 1970s
- Label: Ode
- Past members: Ted Taptiklis aka Theodore Taptiklis; Tony Kaye

Anderson and Wise was a performing duo from New Zealand. They were also composers, whose songs were recorded by Nash Chase, The Rumour, Quincy Conserve, and Kamahl.

== Background ==
Originally from Wellington, they were a duo consisting of Ted Taptiklis and Tony Kaye. In November 1972, after six weeks of semi-finals, along with Andy Waretini, Steve Gilpin, and Shona Laing, they were among the seven contestants selected for the finals. In 1973, their single "Quiet song" bw "Quiet Song" was released on the Ode label. In July 1973, they were the winners in the second songwriting section with their composition "The Boy From Dundee".

=== Later years ===
Around the mid-1980s, Kaye recorded some material with a group called Jonahs. In later years Taptiklis formed Storymaker Partners in the United Kingdom. He is also the author of Unmanaging: Opening up the Organization to its Own Unspoken Knowledge ISBN 978-1-349-36470-1, which was published by Palgrave Macmillan in 2008.

== Other artists covering ==
"Anderson And Wise" was covered by Nash Chase, and in 1972, it was an APRA Silver Scroll nominated song.

In 1973, as part of the Commonwealth Games pop tune competition, their composition "The Boy From Dundee", performed by Kamahl on Programme 4 of the comp. It was competing against "Country Spring" by Larry Philip, "Take My Life" by Desna Sisarich, "Natural Man by Bunny Walters, "What Do You Do" by Lutha, and "Games Spirit" by Nash Chase. On Programme 6, their other comp Quiet Song by "Anderson & Wise", performed by The Rumour, was up against songs sung by Ray Columbus, Deane Waretini, Steve Allen and Steve Gilpin. "Join Together" by Steve Allen was the winner. Their two songs, "A Quiet Song" performed by The Rumour and "The Boy From Dundee", performed by Kamahl appeared on the 20 Studio One Hits Volume 2 various artists compilation. Kamahl's version of "The Boy From Dundee" entered the charts in August 1973. It stayed on the charts for four weeks, peaking at no 12, holding that position for two weeks.

In 1974, their composition, "Epistolary" was the B side of single by Quincy Conserve. It was released on the Ode label. The following year it was released in Australia on Warner Brothers. Tony Kaye produced both sides of the release. It was also an APRA Silver Scroll nominated song for 1975.

"Yo Yo Mac" appeared on Reality Show, which was the third album by the Whanganui blues band, Blues Buffett. The album which was released in 2015 featured compositions by the band. "Yo Yo Mac" was the only song not composed by the band's members.

== Discography ==
Anderson and Wise Singles
Title	Release info	Year	Notes
"Anderson and Wise" / "Yo Yo Mac"	Ode ODE-50	1972	
"The Boy From Dundee"/"Quiet Song"	Ode	1973	

VA compilations
Release	Song title	Release info	Year	F	Notes
Out from the cold (1964–1972)	"Yo Yo Mac"	Jayrem Records – D30872, Festival Records – D30872	1992	CD	

Artists covering
Song title	Artist	Appears on release	Release info	Year	F	Notes
"Anderson And Wise"	Nash Chase	"Anderson and Wise" / "Fantasy"	His Master's Voice HR.479	1972	Single	
"The Boy From Dundee"	Kamahl	"The Boy From Dundee" / "All I Have To Offer You (Is Me)"	Philips 6037 029	1973	Single	
"A Quiet Song"	The Rumour	An Evening At Home (The Best Of The Rumour)	Karussell 223	1973	LP	
"Epistolary"	Quincy Conserve	"Song For The Man" / "Epistolary"	Ode ODE 581	1974	Single	Both sides prod by Tony Kaye
"Yo Yo Mac"	The Blues Buffet	Reality Show		2015	CD	
