= Vaughan Lawrence =

Singer and recording artist from Auckland, New Zealand

Vaughan Lawrence is an Auckland-based singer and recording artist who originally migrated to New Zealand from England. He was for a period of time the resident singer of the popular series Happen Inn.

== Background ==
He was born in Liverpool.

== Career ==
=== Early 1970s ===
In 1971, the edition of 11 September of The Auckland Star reported that Lawrence's position of resident singer on Happen Inn was to be taken over by Bunny Walters who would be sharing the position with Suzanne Donaldson. In October 1971, along with Craig Scott and The Rumour, he was one of the supporting artists for Cilla Black for her New Zealand tour.

In 1972, he released two singles, the first one on Polydor and then the other on Philips. "So Long Love" backed with "My Ship Is Coming In" was released on Philips. The edition of 11 November of Billboard reported that his composition "Take What You Can", which also was a Studio One entry in the original songwriting section, was released as a single. The single backed with "Go Away Little Girl" was released on Polydor. "Take What You Can" appeared on the N.Z.B.C. Studio One television series album 20 Studio One Hits.

=== Mid 1970s ===
In August 1976, he returned to Auckland after spending two months abroad, spending time in Australia and Hong Kong. He was planning for the following year to perform on the South Pacific circuit and also in South-east Asia. An article titled "Galloping performer" in the edition of 13 July 1977 of The New Zealand Herald reported that he was now based in Sydney and performing in Cabaret venues and on television across Australia.

== Discography ==
Singles
Title	Release info	Year	Notes
"So Long My Love" / "My Ship Is Coming In"	Philips 6036 023	1972	
"Take What You Can" / "Go Away Little Girl"	Polydor 2069 017	1972	

Various artist compilation appearances
Title	Release info	Year	Track(s)	F	Notes
20 Studio One Hits	Music for Leisure 440	1972	"Take What You Can"	LP	
Sing	TV2 T.V.2	1975	"Happy Birthday Baby"	LP	
