= Wolfgramm =

Wolfgramm is a surname. Notable people with the surname include:

- Bill Wolfgramm (Tongan musician)
- Greg Wolfgramm (born 1974), Tongan rugby league player
- Nani Wolfgramm (Tongan musician)
- Paea Wolfgramm (Tongan boxer)
- Willie Wolfgramm (Tongan rugby league player)
- The Jets, Minneapolis-based Tongan singing group made up of members of the Wolfgramm family

== See also ==
- Wolfgram
