= Anderson and Wise =

Anderson and Wise may refer to:

- Anderson and Wise (musical duo) - a 1960s New Zealand musical act
- Anderson and Wise (song) - a song by Anderson and Wise
