= The Boy from Dundee =

"The Boy From Dundee"

Single by Kamahl
- A-side: "The Boy From Dundee"
- B-side: "All I Have To Offer You (Is Me)"
- Released: 1973
- Genre: Pop
- Label: Philips 6037 029
- Songwriter: Anderson and Wise (musical duo)

"The Boy From Dundee" was a song written by Anderson and Wise. It was originally recorded by them. It later became a hit for Kamahl in 1973.

== Background ==
The song was released in 1973 as the A side of the second single by Anderson and Wise. The B side was "Quiet Song".

In 1973, as part of the Commonwealth Games pop tune competition, it was performed by Kamahl on Programme 4 of the competition. It was competing against "Country Spring" by Larry Philip, "Take My Life" by Desna Sisarich, "Natural Man by Bunny Walters, "What Do You Do" by Lutha, and "Games Spirit" by Nash Chase. In the competition that saw Steve Allen win with "Join Together", the song won its songwriters the second songwriting section position.

It appeared on the 20 Studio One Hits Vol 2 various artists compilation.

Kamahl's version of the song entered the charts in August 1973. It stayed on the charts for four weeks, peaking at no 12, holding that position for two weeks. Along with his other hits, was to sing the song at the Kyneton Town Hall on October 10, 2014.
