= Nani Wolfgramm =

- Birth name: Maxwell Ferdinand Wolfgramm
- Born: November 1, 1939; Neiafu, Vava'u, Tonga
- Died: August 26, 2012 (aged 72)
- Genres: Polynesian
- Occupation: Musician
- Instrument: Steel guitar
- Years active: 1960s–2000's
- Labels: Viking, Monitor Records

Nani Wolfgramm was a Tongan born Steel guitarist and recording artist who released multiple albums throughout the 1970s and 1980s.

== Biography ==
Wolfgramm was born 1 November 1939 in Neiafu, Vava’u, Tonga. His parents were Konrad Uhi Wolfgramm, and Alilia Funaki Toutai Fulivai. He was of Tongan and German descent.

He was the nephew of pioneering Steel Guitarist Bill Wolfgramm who along with Bill Sevesi made many recordings on the Viking Records label.

Nani had albums released on Viking, the same label as released his uncle Bill's albums. Nani's releases included The Sounds Of Hawaii, Hawaiian Cocktail and Hawaii Calls

He died on 26 August 2012.

== Releases ==
=== LP ===
- Hawaiian Cocktail - Viking SPVP 168

=== LP's ===
- Hawaii Calls - Viking SPVP 152, 1976
- The Sounds of Hawaii - Viking SPVP 465

=== Compact Disc ===
- 20 Golden Hits of Hawaii - Monitor Records MON61804
- Polynesian Girl - Monitor Records MON00826 - 1986
