= Let Me Hear You Whisper (song) =

Single
- Genre: Pop, Pacific Island music
- Songwriter(s): Napoleon A. Tuiteleleapaga, Ray Evans & Jay Livingston

Let me Hear You Whisper is a popular Samoan song that has been covered by a multitude of artists that include Jo Stafford, Nephi Hannemann, the Samoan Surf Riders, Fatu, and many others. The song is a staple in Samoan music and has great popularity in the Pacific. The title in Samoan is "Tele i’a o le sami".

== Background ==
The song was composed by Napoleon A. Tuiteleleapaga, Ray Evans, and Jay Livingston. In Samoan the song's title is "Tele I`a O le Sami". The song is so well known in Samoa that it would probably be one of the first a visitor to the islands will hear.

=== English versions ===
A version was recorded by Jo Stafford And David Hughes and backed with the Paul Weston Orchestra.

=== In film ===
Along with five other Samoan and Polynesian songs, it was included in the film Mr. Roberts.

== Releases ==
=== English or Western styled versions ===
- Jo Stafford and David Hughes
- The Voices Of Walter Schumann

=== Hawaiian artists and other Polynesian artists ===
- Alfred Apaka and the Hawaiian Village Serenaders
- Sonny Chillingworth
- Lanakila's Polynesians
- Bill Wolfgramm
- Daphne Walker

=== Samoan artists ===
- Fatu
- The Five Stars
- Jerome Grey
- Nephi Hannemann and El Leon Orchestra
- The Samoan Surfriders
- the Yandall Sisters of NZ (Samoa Ea album 1965) Viking records
