= Quincy Conserve =

Rock band from Wellington, New Zealand

The Quincy Conserve
- Origin: Wellington, New Zealand
- Genres: Rock; Jazz rock
- Years active: 1967–1975
- Labels: His Master's Voice; Regal
- Past members: Malcolm Hayman; Kevin Furey; Ria Kerekere; Dave Orams; Graeme Thompson; Frits Stigter; Rufus Rehu; Johnny McCormick; Dennis Mason; Barry Brown-Sharpe; Raice McLeod; Earl Anderson; Brian Beauchamp; Bruno Lawrence; Richard Burgess; Tom Swainson; Mike Conway; Paul Clayton; Murray Loveridge; Peter Blake; Rodger Fox; Geoff Culverwell; Billy Brown; Harry Leki; Peter Cross

The Quincy Conserve (commonly known as Quincy Conserve) was a New Zealand group that were active from 1967 to 1975. Originating from Wellington, they were one of the biggest bands in the lower North Island.

== Background ==
Among the various lineups, the membership has included Bruno Lawrence. For a while trombonist Rodger Fox was a member. For a period of time they were the house band for Wellington’s His Master's Voice studios.

=== 1960s ===
The group started out in late 1967, and was formed by Malcolm Hayman. In 1968, they were backing Allison Durbin on some of her recordings.

=== 1970s ===
In 1970, Kevin Furey who had previously been with the group Top shelf joined the group. At a point in time that year, the lineup consisted of Furey, Malcolm Hayman, Bruno Lawrence, Johnny McCormick, Dennis Mason, Dave Orams and Rufus Rehu. Also in 1970, the Bruno Lawrence composition "Ride the Rain" came in the finals at that year's Loxene Golden Disc Awards.

In 1971, the group briefly reunited with Allison Durbin to play at the Downtown Club in Wellington. In 1973, they backed The Brothers Johnson at the Downtown Club.

In 1974. They released the single, "Song For The Man", composed by Paul Clayton, backed with "Epistolary", composed by Anderson and Wise. It was released on the Ode label. The following year it was released in Australia on Warner Brothers. Tony Kaye produced both sides of the release. It was also an APRA Silver Scroll nominated song for 1975.

They disbanded in 1975.

=== Later years ===
In 1980, guitarist Kevin Furey, who was married to the cousin of Deane Waretini's Manager George Tait, played the trumpet on Waretini's hit "The Bridge". Furey later played for several years with the Royal New Zealand Navy band. In 2013, Furey teamed up with Larry Morris to play in his band Larry Morris & Rebellion.

In later years Malcolm Hayman was in a band called Captain Custard which featured Murray Loveridge, Dave Alexander and Don Burke. A later line up of Captain Custard included Peter Whyte, Stu Petrie and Jimmy Dwan.

== Line-up ==
- Malcolm Hayman: lead guitar, vocals, arrangements
- Kevin Furey: guitar, trumpet, vocals
- Ria Kerekere: vocals
- Dave Orams: bass guitar, vocals
- Graeme Thompson: bass guitar, vocals
- Frits Stigter: bass guitar
- Rufus Rehu: keyboards
- Johnny McCormick: saxophone, flute
- Dennis Mason: saxophone, vocals
- Barry Brown-Sharpe: trumpet, tenor horn
- Raice McLeod: drums
- Earl Anderson: drums
- Brian Beauchamp: drums
- Bruno Lawrence: drums
- Richard Burgess: drums
- Tom Swainson: drums
- Mike Conway: drums
- Billy Brown: drums
- Paul Clayton: guitar, vocals
- Harry Leki: guitar
- Murray Loveridge: bass guitar
- Peter Blake: keyboards
- Rodger Fox: trombone
- Geoff Culverwell: trumpet
- Peter Cross: trumpet

== Discography ==
=== Singles ===
Song Title (A-side/B-side)
Song Title (A-side/B-side)	Year	Notes
"I'm So Proud"/"I've Been Loving You, Baby"	1968	
"Hallelujah"/"Here's To The Next Time"	April 1969	Released under 'The Quincy Conserve'
"Lovin' Look"/"Soul Thing"	1970	Released under 'The Quincy Conserve'
"Ride The Rain"/"I Feel Good"	July 1970	Released under 'The Quincy Conserve'
"Aire Of Good Feeling"/"Don't Arrange Me"	1971	
"Alright In The City"/"Somebody Stole My Thunder"	1971	Released under 'The Quincy Conserve'
"Going Back To The Garden"/"My Michelle Chan"	1971	Released under 'The Quincy Conserve'
"Somebody, Somewhere Help Me"/"Tango Boo Gonk"	1972	
"Roundhouse"/"You Can't Take Your Love"	1972	
"Keep On Pushing"/"Lady Listen"	1973	
"Slut"/"Keep On Playing That Rock And Roll"	1973	
"Song For The Man"/"Epistolary"	1974	
"Rockin' Chair"/"Super Strut"	1975	

=== Studio albums ===
- Listen To The Band (1970 - Regal)
- Epitaph (Quincy Conserve 1967-71) (1972 - Regal)
- Tasteful (1973 - EMI)
- The Quincy Conserve (1975 - Õde Records)

=== Live albums ===
- Live with Lutha, Blerta and Desna Sisarich (1973 - EMI)

=== Compilations ===
- The Very Best Of... (2001 - EMI)
- Aire of Good Feeling - Best Of (2008 - EMI)
