= Pepe and the Rarotongans =

- Also known as: Pepe & her Rarotongans
- Origin: Cook Islands or New Zealand
- Genres: Polynesian music
- Years active: 1950s to 1960s
- Labels: Viking Records, Salem
- Past members: Pepe; Sonny Terei; Nat Mara; Charles Carlson; Mark Anton

Pepe and the Rarotongans were a popular Cook Island music group fronted by a female singer, Pepe. They were active in the 1950s and 1960s. As recording artists, they had albums released on the Viking and Salem labels.

== Background ==
The main force of the group was Pepe, formerly known as Pepe Taimata Pekamu Maoate, and Sonny Terei, also known as Sonny Tutai O Poko Maru Tamariki Nootu Teatuairo Terei. Sonny was born on 27 August 1933 in Ngatangiia, Rarotonga. He left the Cook Islands for New Zealand in 1947, to train as an electrical linesman. Pepe and Sonny were married on 29 May 1955.

As an act, Sonny did the arrangements for their music. Pepe became known for being the first Cook Islands singer to be recorded by Viking Records. Along with Will Crummer, they achieved a level of fame and had a short succession of hits from the late 1950s to the 1960s. As mentioned in Glenda Tuaine's Celebrate Cook Islands Tarekareka! article in Escape Magazine, like Crummer, Jon Jonassen and Jake Numanga, they are considered pioneers. Sonny has also been an influence on Cook Islands musicians such as Mann Short and John Lindsay.

Guitarist for the group, Nat Mara, was a recording artist in his own right. In addition to his album Peeping At Papeete and EPs La Tahitienne and A Taste Of Tahiti which were released on Viking, he had an album Welcome to Tahiti which was released on the Olympic label.

== Career ==
The beginning of the Viking connection can be possibly traced to an event in the late 1950s. Sonny, a musician, was to back a female singer in an Auckland recording studio. The singer never turned up and the producer asked Sonny's wife Pepe if she could take part in the session.

By 1964, they had at least two albums issued on Viking, they were Rarotonga Calling and Passion Flower, details of which appeared in the Pacific Islands Monthly magazine. The line up at the time of their Rarotonga Calling release consisted of Pepe, Sonny Terei, Nat Mara, Charles Carlson and Mark Anton. In 1965, their EP Songs Of The Cook Islands was released on the Salem label. All compositions were by Sonny Terei. The four songs were "Te Marama Te Au Etu", "Momotu Te Inangaro", "Tatara Apa", and "E Oa". In 1968, their album Memories of Rarotonga was released on Salem. The album of Rarotongan songs featured a painting by Kase Jackson, a well-known artist. In 1973, Siren Songs Of The South Seas, credited to Pepe & Her Rarotongans, was released on the Olympic Records label.

In 1977, the Rarotongan Hotel had just opened and Sonny and Pepe were invited by Cook Islands Premier, Albert Henry, to return there to provide entertainment for the hotel.

== Later years ==
In the early 1980s, Sonny was teaching music and assisting the choir at the Titikaveka Cook Islands Christian Church, after having approached by the Rev Teariki Vaerua. Quite likely, as a result of his input, for four years in a row the church won the Celebrations choir competition. In 1984, on a fundraising trip, and under the leadership of Bishop Pere (then known as Rev Tutai), Sonny and Pepe toured New Zealand with the Titikaveka CICC choir. Sonny remained a dedicated Christian for the rest of his life.

Sonny died on 25 November 2009. Pepe died at 6.40pm on Sunday, 8 June 2014 at age 81.

In 2011, one of Pepe, and Sonny's compositions, "Tama Ine" appeared on Will Crummer's Shoebox Love Songs compilation, released on the Ode label.

== Members ==
- Mark Anton ... steel guitar or keyboards?
- Charles Carlson ... guitar
- Nat Mara ... guitar
- Pepe Taimata Pekamu Maoate ... vocal
- Sonny Terei ... guitar

== Discography ==
EP
Title	Release info	Year	Notes
Do you understand?	Viking VE 110	C 1962	
Cook Islands Song Festival	Viking VE 113	C 1962	
Songs Of The Cook Islands	Salem XE 3015	1965	

Album
Title	Release info	Year	Notes
Rarotonga Calling	Viking VP 81	1962	
Passion Flower	Viking VP 89	1962	
Meet me in Rarotonga	Viking VP 118		
Memories of Rarotonga	Salem XP 5020	1968	
Cook Islands Pacific Paradise	Salem XPS 5056	1969	
South Seas Idyll Music of the Tropical Isles	Viking VP 329	1970	Note The New Zealand Archive of Film, Television has this as Siren Songs Of The South Seas; Music of the Tropical Isles; Pepe & her Rarotongans
Siren Songs Of The South Seas	Olympic OL-6153	1979	
Eddie Lund Presents .... Pepe and the Rarotongans	Tahiti Records	EL 1014	
Siren Songs of the South Seas, Music of the Tropical Isles	Everest 6153		

Appearances - various artists compilations
Title	Release info	Year	Songs by artist	Notes
Island Songs of Farewell	Salem	1965		
Ports of Paradise	Salem XPS 5023	1966	"Tatara apa", " Te marama te au etu"	
Cook Islands Pacific Paradise	Salem	1969		
Call of the Pacific	Salem	1969	"Manuiri", "Nga pu ariki"	
Action Rarotonga! Will Crummer and The Royal Rarotongans, Pepe and The Rarotongans	Viking VP 251	1967		
Music Of The South Seas! A Visit To Tahiti, New Zealand, Rarotonga	World Record Club 889		"E Tiare", "Easy Mama" "Kua Akaruke"	
