= Join Together =

Join Together may refer to:

- "Join Together" (The Who song), 1972
- Join Together (album), a 1990 live album by The Who
- "Join Together" (Steve Allen song), 1974
