= Salem (record label) =

Former record label

- Founded: 1960s
- Genre: Polynesian music, Ethnic Music, Pop Music, Rock and Roll, Country, Jazz
- Country of origin: New Zealand

Salem was a New Zealand record label that lasted from the mid 1960s to the early 1970s.

== Background ==
The label was owned by Peter Caithness. Both Caithness and co-founder, Dennis Bailey were formerly employees with the Viking label. The label which was headquartered in Wellington had a 75% Polynesian catalogue in 1968. Some of the popular releases included Herma Keil & The Keil Isles with their Keils A-Go-Go! album, and the various artists album An Evening At Tommo's Place, which featured Bridgette Allen, Ray Woolf and Martin Kini.

== Ethnic releases ==
=== Catalogue (selective) ===
Maori, Polynesian, Melanesian LPs
| Artist | Title | Release info | Year | Notes |
|---|---|---|---|---|
| Vineula Girls Choir | Welcome to Samoa | Salem XP5018 | | |
| Pepe and the Rarotongans | Memories of Rarotonga | Salem XP5020 | | |
| The Vei Lomai Group | Isa Lei & Other Songs of Fiji | Salem XPS5041 | | |
| Ohau Maori Youth Club | Maori Songs | Salem XPS5042 | | |
| Kabu Kei Rewa Group | Songs of Fiji | Salem XP5044 | | |
| Kabu Kei Vuda Entertainers | Fabulous Fiji | Salem XPS.5049 | 1969 | |
| The Awatea Maori Singers | Discovering New Zealand | Salem XPS.5050 | 1969 | |
| Timoce Gucake And His Burning West Serenaders | Timoce Gucake and his Burning West Serenaders | Salem XPS 5085 | 1975 | |

== Popular and Jazz ==
Popular singles
| Artist | Title | Release info | Year | Notes |
|---|---|---|---|---|
| Laurie Allen And Bobby Bright | "Belong With You" / "Trouble In Mind" | Salem XS.101 | 1965 | |
| The Henchmen | "Rockin' Robin" / "Baby What's Wrong" | Salem XS.102 | 1965 | |
| "Billy Adams" | "Alone" / "Slow Down Sandy" | Salem XS.103 | 1965 | |
| M.P.D. Limited | " Little Boy Sad" / "Wendy, Don't Go" | Salem XS.104 | 1965 | |
| "Kevin Watson" | "Beehive" / "Carioca" | Salem XS.105 | 1966 | |
| Robin Ruakere | "English Country Garden" / "The Frozen Logger" | Salem XS.106 | 1966 | |
