= Nash Chase =

- Born: Taihape, New Zealand
- Genres: Pop
- Occupations: Musician, life coach, counsellor
- Labels: Ode, His Master's Voice, EMI

Nash Chase is a former pop singer from New Zealand who recorded for the Ode and His Master's Voice labels. He released a string of singles in the early 1970s. He is remembered for "What Greater Love", "Today I Killed a Man I Didn't Know" and "Anderson and Wise".

== Background ==
Born in Taihape, Chase came from a very large family of at least 18. His brothers, Frank, Richard and Colin have been involved in music. His brother Frank had a record released on the PYE label in 1969, "The Frog"/"Popeye Dance". His youngest brother Colin Rex Chase was a Jazz drummer. Colin who also played in the A to Zeev Big Band, and funk band Jones Cartel, died of cancer on 10 March 2015.

== Career ==
=== 1970 ===
In May 1970, along with Lyn Calman, and Tui Fox, Chase was one 15 entertainers selected from over 1000 entries for Studio One's New Faces. In July of that year he won the Wanganui Talent Quest. In August, he won the 1970 New Faces competition. On the week ending with 5 September 1970, Billboard reported his single "What Greater Love" entering the New Zealand charts at position 10. The single backed with "Raindrops Keep Falling On My Head" was released on the Ode label. His previous single "Sound Of Love" backed with "My Special Prayer" was also released on Ode. In October 1970, Chase was photographed with competition winner Pam who had entered a promotional competition for the film Woodstock, which was organised by Kings Theatre in Wellington. The prize was tickets to the film's premiere, the 3 record LP soundtrack, and dinner with Chase.

=== 1971 ===
In April 1971, Chase and Lew Pryme appeared at Mt. Crawford Prison, and it was reported by Billboard that they were the first pop singers to so. In June 1971, his pressing "Today I Killed A Man I Didn't Know" was released on His Master's Voice. This was his first release for the label. The single was backed with "World Of Lavender Lace". Almost straight away, the single became a hit on the Top 20 chart. It also became a finalist in the 1971 Loxene Gold Disc awards. He released another single that year on His Master's Voice. It was "If You'd Like To Be A Lady" backed with "Teresa".

=== 1972 to 1974 ===
In 1972, he had four singles released on His Master's Voice. They were "Eye For The Main Chance" bw "Bless Your Sweet Little Soul", "Anderson and Wise" bw "Fantasy", "Angel She Was Love" bw "To Hurt A Friend", and "Midnight Magic Man" bw " Fantasy". "Eye For The Main Chance", and "Anderson And Wise" did well, with the latter reaching the finals of the 1972 Studio One Contest.

His final single in the seventies was "Maria Isabella" bw "Spanish Eyes" in 1973. It was released on the EMI label. It became a finalist in the 1973 RATA Awards. In February of that year, Chase and his wife relocated to Sydney, Australia. In June 1973, he appeared on part 4 of a Studio One series in a competition for the 1974 Commonwealth Games pop tune. Singing the song "Games Spirit", he was competing against "The Boy From Dundee", performed by Kamahl, "Country Spring" by Larry Philip, "Take My Life" by Desna Sisarich, "Natural Man" by Bunny Walters, and "What Do You Do" by Lutha. One of the singers he was competing against, Kamahl, was singing an Anderson and Wise composition. This was the same song-writing team (Ted Kaptiklis aka Ted Taptiklis and Tony Kaye) that wrote his hit "Anderson And Wise".

Chase made two appearances on The Ernie Sigley Show in 1974. The first was on 20 June. Bill and Boyd, Allison Durbin, Geraldine Fitzgerald, and Bronwyn Gordon appeared as well. Chase performed the "Rockin' Robin medley". The next time was on 22 August. Other guests included Yvonne Barrett, David Belcher, and Mary Ann Leyden. On that occasion he performed "My Woman, My Woman, My Wife".

=== 1975 onwards ===
In August 1976, Chase was regularly appearing in a prestigious Sydney hotel bar as its resident artist, and his first Australian LP was ready for release the following month.

In 1998, his version of "Today I Killed A Man I Didn't Know" was included on the Vietnam Remembered various artists compilation.

Today Nash Chase is a life coach and meditation teacher.

== Discography ==
Singles
Title	Release info	Year	Notes
"Sound Of Love" / "My Special Prayer"	Ode ODE-8	1970	
"What Greater Love" / "Raindrops Keep Falling On My Head"	Ode ODE-11	1970	
"I Will Bring You Flowers in the Morning" / "Words"	Ode ODE-15	1970	
"Handbags And Gladrags" / "Open Up Wide"	Epic ESO.7041	1971	
"Today I Killed a Man I Didn't Know" / "World Of Lavender Lace"	His Master's Voice H.R. 434	1971	
"If You'd Like to Be a Lady" / "Theresa"	His Master's Voice HR.445	1971	
"Anderson and Wise" / "Fantasy"	His Master's Voice HR.479	1972	
"Eye for the Main Chance" / "Bless Your Sweet Little Soul"	His Master's Voice HR.467	1972	
"Angel She Was Love" / "To Hurt A Friend"	His Master's Voice HR.481	1972	
"Midnight Magic Man" / "Fantasy"	His Master's Voice HR.488	1972	
"Maria Isabella" / "Spanish Eyes"	EMI HR.502	1973	
"Dashing Dougie" / "Pokare Kare Ana"	West End 13147	1981	Song about cricketer Doug Walters; Hit top 40 in some areas in Australia

Albums
Title	Release info	Year	F	Notes
Nash Chase	Ode SODE-012	1970	LP	
Handle with Care	His Master's Voice	1972	LP	
Handle with Care (EMI release)	EMI WRC E.3145 HSD.1024	1972	LP	Cat no. WRC E.3145 HSD.1024 gives an indication that this is a World Record Club mail order item. Store copies would just have HSD.1024.
Portrait of Nash Chase	Axis AXIS 2005	1974	LP	Compilation; Re-release of Handle With Care with the addition of last EMI single.
Nash Chase	Axis AXIS 6265	1976	LP	
The Very Best of Nash Chase	EMI 583045	2003	CD	
Nash Chase	Video Pacific Communications	2 May 2009	Digital	Compilation

Compilation album appearances
Album title	Release info	Year	Song Title	F	Notes
Hits & Stars Of '70	Philips 6334 006	1970	"What Greater Love"	LP	2 x LP
1971 Loxene Golden Disc Award, Top Twelve	Loxene Lox 1971	1971	"Today I Killed A Man I Didn't Know"	LP	
20 Studio One Hits	Music for Leisure 440	1972	"Anderson and Wise"	LP	
20 Golden Rata Award Hits	Music for Leisure RATA 1	1973	"Maria Isabella"	LP	
New Zealand Gold Volume Two	Regal SREG 30219	1979	"Today I Killed A Man I Didn't Know"	LP	
Kiwi Rock Vol. 3	EMI 4710582	1995	"Eye For The Main Chance"	CD	2 x CD
Kiwi Classics Volume 4	EMI 5221052	1999	"Today I Killed A Man I Didn't Know"	CD	
Kiwi Classics Volume 6	EMI 532953 2	2001	"Midnight Magic Man"	CD	
Waiata : Maori Showbands, Balladeers & Pop Stars	His Master's Voice – 50999 6802952 4 EMI – 50999 6802952 4	2011	"Give Me A Little Sign" "What Greater Love"	CD	2 x CD

== Television ==
Titles
Title	Role	Director	Year	Notes #
New Faces	Himself		1970	
New Faces	Himself		1972	
The Ernie Sigley Show	Himself		1974	Episode: 22 August
The Ernie Sigley Show	Himself		1974	Episode: 20 June
