= Anderson and Wise (song) =

"Anderson And Wise"

Single by Nash Chase
- A-side: "Anderson And Wise"
- B-side: "Fantasy"
- Released: 1972
- Genre: Pop
- Label: His Master's Voice HR 479
- Songwriter: Anderson and Wise

"Anderson and Wise" was a local charting hit for Nash Chase. It was also a Studio One finalist, and an award winner. It was also written by a members of a duo of the same name.

== Background ==
=== Anderson & Wise (Ted Taptiklis and Tony Kaye) version ===
The song was written by a Wellington pop vocal duo made up of Ted Taptiklis and Tony Kaye. They actually were called Anderson and Wise. The song backed with "Yo Yo Mac" was released on the Ode label in 1972. "Yo Yo Mac" appeared on the third album by the Whanganui blues band, Blues Buffett. The album Reality Show, which was released in 2015. "Yo Yo Mac" was the only song not composed by the band's members.

=== Nash Chase version ===
Chase's version was released on His Master's Voice HR.479 in 1972. It was backed with "Fantasy", which was written by Michael Hoeta. Along with the Michael Hoeta composition, it was an APRA Silver Scroll nominated song in 1972. In 1973, it entered the Studio One finals. Along with "The Boy From Dundee", it was the winner of the second songwriting section of the "Studio one" competition. It also made local charts around New Zealand. It appears on the various artists compilation, 20 Studio One Hits, released on Music for Leisure 440, in 1972.

== Releases ==
Releases
Artist	Titles	Release info	Year	Notes
Anderson & Wise	"Anderson And Wise" / "Yo Yo Mac"	Ode-50	1972	Produced by Terence O'Neil-Joyce
Nash Chase	"Anderson And Wise" / "Fantasy"	His Master's Voice HR 479	1972	
