= Bridgette Allen =

New Zealand-born jazz singer

- Born: New Zealand
- Style: Jazz
- Awards: Most Professional Entertainer 1977
- Website: Bridget Allen

Bridgette Allen is a New Zealand-born jazz singer who has a career going back to the 1960s. She has appeared on television in both New Zealand and Australia. She also starred in the film Hooks and Feelers, which was an adaptation of a Keri Hulme story.

== Background ==
Allen was born in New Zealand, and is of Maori descent. She is also the cousin of the singer Abe Phillips who died in 1971.

== Career ==
By April 1970, and with no major plans to return to Australia, Allen was now based in Auckland. In 1971, having already worked in Bangkok, by late February she was in Tahiti. There were plans for her undertake an Australian tour, which she would co-compere with Howard Morrison to promote tourism. In May, due to commitments in New Zealand, Allen turned down a contract as a supporting artist for Morrison in Honolulu. It was reported in the 11 July issue of The Sunday News, that she was to stand in for Paul Fisher while he went with Ray Woolf to the United States, taking two months off of an eight month contract. In April 1973, it was announced in the Sunday Herald that Allen was off to the United States as guest of Carmen McRae. She was also going to look at the possibilities or work over there.

== Mid 70s onwards ==
In June 1975, she embarked on a cabaret tour which would include Australia, the Philippines and the possibly other locations such as Singapore. In 1976, in spite of her comments the previous year that the club circuit was "pretty dead", and television work limited to Australian artists, in May, that year she was off to Australia to carry on with her career there.

== 1980s ==
In 1981, The New Zealand Listener featured an article on her life and career in its 14 February issue. By September 1982, following the birth of her son, she had slowed her career down. By early 1987, she was based in Melbourne.

== Discography ==
Albums
Title	Release info	Year	F	Notes
Fever aka Call me Bridgette	RCA Camden CAS 149	1972	LP	Backing by Trinity: Mike Harvey - Piano, Billy Belton - Bass, Vic Williams - Drums

Appearances
Artist (s)	Title	Release info	Year	tracks	F	Notes
Various artists	An evening at Tommo's Place	Salem	1972	"On a Wonderful Day Like Today", "The Joker Went Wild", "Eight Days a Week" "Agua De Beber", "If You Go Away", "Quando, Quando, Quando"	LP	Bridgette Allen lead vocals
Tina Cross	You Can Do It	Phillips 6334017	1979		LP	Backing Vocals

== Filmography ==
TV and film
Title	Role	Director / producer	Year	Type	Notes
The Club Show	Herself, singer		1979	TV show	Presenters Glyn Tucker and Ernie Leonard
Hooks and Feelers	Mother	Dr Melanie Rodriga (director)	1982	Film	A 50 minute adaptation of a short story by Keri Hulme
