= Midnight Magic Man =

Single by Nash Chase
- B-side: "Fantasy"
- Released: 1972
- Genre: Pop
- Label: His Master's Voice HR.488
- Songwriters: (Hunter, Levenson)

Nash Chase singles chronology
"Angel She Was Love"	"Midnight Magic Man"	"Maria Isabella"

"Midnight Magic Man" is a song written by Neil Levenson and Hank Hunter. It was covered by a couple of groups before it was a top 20 hit for singer Nash Chase in 1973.

== Background ==
The song was written by Neil Levenson and Hank Hunter, aka Henry Hadad, Jr. It was recorded by Franklyn Circle in 1971, and was released on Laurie Records. Also in 1971, it appeared on the B side of Triangle's "Judge And Jury", released on Paramount Records.

=== Nash Chase recording ===
The single backed with "Fantasy" was released on the His Master's Voice label in 1972. It was then released by Columbia. The A side was written by Hunter, Levenson, and produced by Mike Le Petit. The B side "Fantasy" was written by Michael Hoeta.

It registered at no 20 in the New Zealand charts on April 2, 1973. BY April 16, 1973, it was at no 18. It had moved up one notch from the previous weeks position of 19. The number one song on the charts at the time was "Blockbuster" by The Sweet. It spent three weeks on the N.Z. charts.

It appears on the CD album, The Very Best of Nash Chase EMI 583045. It also appears on the various artists compilation, Kiwi Classics Volume 6, EMI – 532953 2, which was released in 2001, and Explosive Hits 73, EMI Hits 3, which was released on LP in the seventies.

Releases
Artist	Titles	Release info	Year	Notes
Franklyn Circle	"Midnight Magic Man" / "Theme From Midnight Magic Man"	Laurie Records LR-3559	1971	Produced by Neil Levenson, Hank Hunter; Arranged by John Abbott
Triangle	"Judge And Jury" / "Midnight Magic Man"	Paramount Records PAA-0123	1971	Arranged by John Abbott
Nash Chase	"Midnight Magic Man" / "Fantasy"	His Master's Voice HR.488	1972	Produced by Mike Le Petit

Various artist compilation appearances
Title	Release info	Year	Artist	F	Notes
Explosive Hits 73	EMI	1973	Nash Chase	LP	
Kiwi Classics Volume 6	EMI 532953 2	1973	Nash Chase	CD	
