= Wiki Baker =

New Zealand vocalist

Wiki Baker QSM
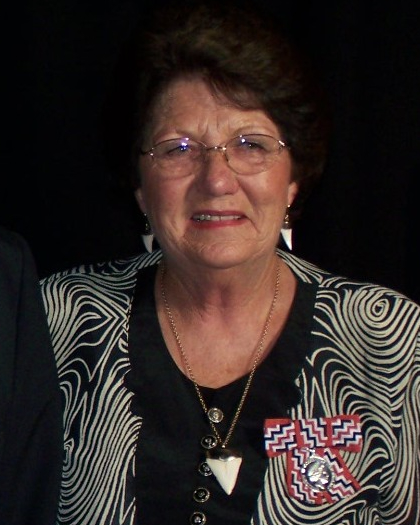
- Baker in 2009
- Occupations: Singer; community worker

Wikitoria Suvia Baker QSM is a New Zealand singer and community worker.

Baker's first solo public performance was as a child at a basketball association concert in Temuka, South Canterbury. She attended St Joseph's Māori Girls' College in Hawkes' Bay and joined the school choir there. In 1958 Viking Records recorded the choir, with Baker as soloist, releasing an album Maori Songs of Enchantment. The album eventually sold over 300,000 copies.

After finishing her schooling Baker moved to Wellington and began singing with the Ngāti Poneke Maori Club and on television on the show Maori Chorale. She also formed a band called the Phoenix Show Band and performed in cabaret shows.

In 1974, Baker sang at the opening of the Commonwealth Games, held in Christchurch, New Zealand. The same year, Viking Records invited her and the St Joseph's choir to re-record their initial album, which was re-released in 1976 as Maori Love Songs. The album sold over 100,000 copies and both the choir and Baker were awarded Golden Discs. Viking also invited Baker to work on a recording New Zealand Maori Chorale. In 1979, after singing tours around New Zealand, Fiji and Australia, Baker settled in New South Wales.

In 1988, Baker returned to New Zealand and settled at Arowhenua. She became involved in a number of community organisations focused on education and social services, including the Ngai Tahu Trust Board, the Aoraki Conservation Board, Te Waka Toi (Maori Arts Board), the National Maori Choir and the Kai Tahu Maori Choir. She also became involved with Women's Refuge and has served on the board of the National Schizophrenia Fellowship Society.

== Recognition ==
In the 2009 New Year Honours, Baker received the Queen's Service Medal, for services to Māori, music and the community. In 2015, her biography was included in an exhibition by Otago Museum focusing on the lives of notable women of Ngāi Tahu.
