= Daphne Walker (singer) =

New Zealand singer (1930–2025)

- Maori Favourites by Walker (1960)

Background information
- Born: 25 September 1930; Great Barrier Island, New Zealand
- Died: 17 July 2025 (aged 94)
- Genres: Polynesian, pop
- Occupation: Singer
- Years active: 1946–1966
- Labels: Viking, Tanza, Zodiac, Armar

Daphne Walker (25 September 1930 – 17 July 2025) was a New Zealand singer popular in the 1950s. Many of her recordings were with Bill Sevesi and Bill Wolfgramm. She had also dueted with George Tumahai. One of her early recordings which proved to be successful was "Haere Mai" that was recorded in 1954 and released on the Tanza label.

== Life and career ==
Walker was born on Great Barrier Island on 25 September 1930. In 1949 she won a talent quest and was recruited to perform a series of 15-minute live broadcasts on 1YA radio with Bill Wolfgramm on steel guitar and Johnny Bradfield on guitar. Her first recording was on the Tanza label, "Haere Mai" in 1955. This went on to sell over 40,000 copies. She recorded more than 30 sides for Tanza. "Hootchy Kootchy Henry" became a hit in Samoa. Her last release was in 1966, the album "Coconut Grove". Walker suffered from stage fright and was reluctant to perform before an audience, preferring studio recording.

In 2012 she was awarded the Nostalgia Award from the Variety Artists Club of New Zealand.

Walker died on 17 July 2025, at the age of 94.

== Discography ==
- Z231 Haere Mai (Daphne Walker w. Bill Wolfgramm) 1955
- Z231 Haere Ra My Love (Daphne Walker w. Bill Wolfgramm)
- Z234 Sophisticated Hula (Daphne Walker w. Bill Wolframm)
- Z234 The Moon of Manakoora (Daphne Walker)
- Z241 Maori Brown Eyes [Sam Freedman] (Daphne Walker w Bill Wolfgram)
- Z242 Hootchy Kootchy Henry (Daphne Walker)
- Z242 My Isle of Golden Dreams (Daphne Walker)
- Z251 The One Rose (Daphne Walker w Bill Wolfgram)
- Z253 Aroha (Daphne Walker w Bill Wolfgram)
- Z253 When My Wahine Does the Poi (Daphne Walker w. Bill Wolfgramm)
- Z255 Let Me Hear You Whisper (Daphne Walker w Bill Wolfgramme Islanders)
- Z255 Tahi Nei Taru Kino (Daphne Walker w Bill Wolfgramme Islanders)
- Z261 An Okey Dokey Hut (Daphne Walker and Bill Wolfgramme's Islanders)
- Z261 Best Wishes (Daphne Walker w. Bill Wolfgramme)
- Z262 Kotuku (Daphne Walker w. Bill Wolfgramme)
- Z262 Maori Action Song (Daphne Walker, Georgina & Ann w. Bill Wolfgramm)
- Z265 Kapuana (Daphne Walker & Bill Wolfgramme)
- Z279 South Sea Rose (Daphne Walker & Bill Wolfgramme Islanders)
- Z283 Lovely Hula Girl (Daphnie Walker & Bill Wolfgramme)
- Z285 Hawaiian Hospitality (Daphne Walker, the Three Wahines w Bill Wolfgramme Islanders)
- Z289 E Naughty Naughty Mai Nei (Daphne Walker)
- Z293 Lonely Kiwi (Daphne Walker w Bill Wolfgramme)
- Z293 Maori Style (Daphne Walker w Bill Wolfgramme)
- Z294 Ukulele Lady (Daphne Walker)
- Z295 Mapuana (Daphne Walker w Bill Wolfgramme)
- Z295 To You Sweetheart Aloha (Daphne Walker)
- Z301 Hula Oni Oni E (Daphne Walker)
- Z304 Blue Lei (Daphne Walker w Bill Wolfgrammme)
- Z304 Hawaiian Hula Eyes (Daphne Walker w Bill Wolfgrammme)
- Z309 An Old Bouquet (Daphne Walker)
- Z309 Kumu in a Mumu (Daphne Walker)
- ZLP 001 Hawaiian Kisses (Daphne Walker w. Bill Wolfgramm)
- ZLP 001 Lovely Hula Hands (Daphne Walker w. Bill Wolfgramm)
- ZLP 001 Manu Rere (Daphne Walker w. Bill Wolfgramm)
- ZLP 001 Polynesian Love Song (Daphne Walker w. Bill Wolfgramm)
- ZLP 002 New Zealand's Christmas Tree (Daphne Walker w. Bill Wolfgramm)
- ZLP 002 Pania of the reef (Daphne Walker w. Bill Wolfgramm) 1955
- Z308 Kaimana Hila (Bill Wolfgramme Islanders [with vocal])
- Z308 Hawaiian Cowboy (Bill Wolfgramme Islanders)

With Bill Wolfgramm:

- An Okey Dokey Hut (Daphne Walker and Bill Wolfgramm's Islanders) (Z261)
- An Old Bouquet (Daphne Walker) (Z309)
- Aroha (Daphne Walker w Bill Wolfgramm) (Z253)
- Best Wishes (Daphne Walker w. Bill Wolfgramm) (Z261)
- Blue Lei (Daphne Walker w Bill Wolfgramm) (Z304)
- Come To Me (Daphne Walker and Bill Wolfgramm)
- E Naughty Naughty Mai Nei (Daphne Walker) (Z289)
- Fijian Holiday (Daphne Walker & Bill Wolfgramm's Hawaiians) [Zodiac Z1063]
- Gay Hawaiian Party (Daphne Walker & Bill Wolfgramm's Hawaiians) [Zodiac Z1063]
- Haere Mai (Daphne Walker w. Bill Wolfgramm) (Z231) 1955
- Haere Ra My Love (Daphne Walker w. Bill Wolfgramm) (Z231)
- Hawaiian Hospitality (Daphne Walker, the Three Wahines w Bill Wolfgramm's Islanders) (Z285)
- Hawaiian Hula Eyes (Daphne Walker w Bill Wolfgramm) (Z304)
- Hawaiian Kisses (Daphne Walker w. Bill Wolfgramm) (ZLP 001)
- Hootchy Kootchy Henry (Daphne Walker) (Z242)
- Hula Oni Oni E (Daphne Walker) (Z301)
- Kapuana (Daphne Walker & Bill Wolfgramm) (Z265)
- Kotuku (Daphne Walker w. Bill Wolfgramm) (Z262)
- Kumu in a Mumu (Daphne Walker) (Z309)
- Let Me Hear You Whisper (Daphne Walker w Bill Wolfgramm's Islanders) (Z255)
- Lonely Kiwi (Daphne Walker w Bill Wolfgramm) (Z293)
- Lovely Hula Girl (Daphnie Walker & Bill Wolfgramm) (Z283)
- Lovely Hula Hands (Daphne Walker w. Bill Wolfgramm) (ZLP 001)
- Manu Rere (Daphne Walker w. Bill Wolfgramm) (ZLP 001)
- Maori Action Song (Daphne Walker, Georgina & Ann w. Bill Wolfgramm) (Z262)
- Maori Brown Eyes [Sam Freedman] (Daphne Walker w Bill Wolfgramm) (Z241)
- Maori Style (Daphne Walker w Bill Wolfgramm) (Z293)
- Mapuana (Daphne Walker w Bill Wolfgramm) (Z295)
- My Isle of Golden Dreams (Daphne Walker) (Z242)
- New Zealand's Christmas Tree (Daphne Walker w. Bill Wolfgramm) (ZLP 002)
- Pania of the Reef (Daphne Walker w. Bill Wolfgramm) 1955 (ZLP 002)
- Polynesian Love Song (Daphne Walker w. Bill Wolfgramm) (ZLP 001)
- Sophisticated Hula (Daphne Walker W Bill Wolfgramm) (Z234)
- South Sea Rose (Daphne Walker & Bill Wolfgramm's Islanders) (Z279)
- Tahi Nei Taru Kino (Daphne Walker w Bill Wolfgramm) (Z255)
- The Moon of Manakoora (Daphne Walker) (Z234)
- The One Rose (Daphne Walker w Bill Wolfgramm) (Z251)
- To You Sweetheart Aloha (Daphne Walker) (Z295)
- Ukulele Lady (Daphne Walker) (Z294)
- When My Wahine Does the Poi (Daphne Walker w. Bill Wolfgramm) (Z253)
- Polynesian Love Song / Hawaiian War Chant (Daphne Walker & Bill Wolfgramm's Hawaiians) (1957) Z-1004 Zodiac With Bill Sevesi:
- Analani E (Daphne Walker & George Tumahai w Bill Sevesi and his Islanders)
- Beneath Blue Skies (Daphne Walker w Bill Sevesi and his Islanders)
- Best Wishes (A Merry Xmas) (Ronnie Sundin-Daphne Walker-Will Jess and his Jesters)
- Beyond Desire (Daphne Walker w Bill Sevesi and his Islanders)
- Beyond the Reef (Daphne Walker w Bill Sevesi and his Islanders)
- Blue Hawaii (Daphne Walker & Buddy Wilson w Bill Sevesi)
- Coconut Grove (Daphne Walker, Lin Peyroux & Morgan Clarke w Bill Sevesi)
- Come A Waltzing (Daphne Walker w Bill Sevesi)
- E Naughty Naughty Mai Nei (Daphne Walker w Bill Sevesi)
- E Pari Ra (Daphne Walker & George Tumahai w Bill Sevesi and his Islanders)
- E Puru Tai Tama (Daphne Walker & George Tumahai w Bill Sevesi and his Islanders)
- Haere Mai [Freedman](Daphne Walker & George Tumahai w Bill Sevesi and his Islanders)
- He Puti Pai (Daphne Walker w Bill Sevesi and his Islanders)
- Hoki Hoki (Daphne Walker & George Tumahai w Bill Sevesi and his Islanders)
- Hoki Hoki 2 (Daphne Walker, Buddy Wilson w Bill Sevesi)
- Hoki Mai (Daphne Walker & Buddy Wilson w Bill Sevesi Group)
- Hoki Mai 2 (Daphne Walker & George Tumahai w Bill Sevesi and his Islanders)
- Honolulu (Daphne Walker w Bill Sevesi and his Islanders)
- Honolulu 2 (Daphnie Walker w Bill Sevesi)
- I'd Like to See Some More of Samoa (Daphne Walker w Bill Sevesi and his Islanders)
- In the Royal Hawaiian Hotel (Daphne Walker w Bill Sevesi and his Islanders)
- Isa Lei (Daphne Walker w Bill Sevesi)
- Kapuana (Daphne Walker w Bill Sevesi Group)
- Land of the Lond White Cloud [Freedman] (Daphne Walker w Bill Sevesi and his Islanders)
- Lovely Hula Girl (Daphne Walker & George Tumahai w Bill Sevesi and his Islanders)
- Manaonoa Vau Ia Oe (Daphne Walker w Bill Sevesi and his Islanders)
- Manu Rere (Daphne Walker & George Tumahai w Bill Sevesi and his Islanders)
- Maori Brown Eyes (Daphne Walker & George Tumahai w Bill Sevesi Group)
- Marama Pai (Daphne Walker w Bill Sevesi and his Islanders)
- Maringi Moe (Daphne Walker & George Tumahai w Bill Sevesi and his Islanders)
- Moon of Manakoora (Daphne Walker)
- My Tahitian Lullaby (Daphnie Walker w Bill Sevesi)
- My Treasure Island (Daphnie Walker, Lin Peyroux & Morgan Clarke w Bill Sevesi)
- Naku Re Te Wai (Daphne Walker & George Tumahai w Bill Sevesi and his Islanders)
- Pa Mai (Daphne Walker & George Tumahai w Bill Sevesi and his Islanders)
- Pamai (Daphnie Walker, Buddy Wilson & Morgan Clarke w Bill Sevesi)
- Pokarekare (Daphne Walker w Bill Sevesi)
- Pretty Kehulani (Daphne Walker w Bill Sevesi and his Islanders)
- Rekareka Te Hauti (Daphne Walker w Bill Sevesi and his Islanders)
- Sophisticated Hula (Daphne Walker w Bill Sevesi)
- Taha Nei Taru Kino (Daphnie Walker, Buddy Wilson & Morgan Clarke w Bill Sevesi)
- Tahi Nei Taru Kino (Daphne Walker & George Tumahai w Bill Sevesi and his Islanders)
- Te Reva Nei Au E (Daphne Walker)
- Thank You for Making My Day (Daphne Walker)
- The Way You Walk (Ronnie Sundin – Daphne Walker – Will Jess and his Jesters)
- Tiare Fei (Daphne Walker w Bill Sevesi and his Islanders)
- Under The Sun (Daphne Walker w Bill Sevesi)
- Waihi Moon (Daphne Walker w Bill Sevesi and his Islanders)
- We Talk Only in Our Sleep (Daphne Walker w Bill Sevesi Group)

=== 78 RPM ===
- Daphne Walker & Bill Wolfgramm's Hawaiians – Polynesian Love Song / Hawaiian War Chant – Zodiac Z – 1004, 1957

=== 7" 45 RPM Singles ===
- Via Con Dios / Broken Wings – Zodiac Z – 1005, 1960
- Daphne Walker – Gay Hawaiian Party / Bill Wolfgramm – Hawaiian War Chant – Zodiac Z – 1066, 1961

=== 7" EP ===
- Daphne Walker avec Bill Sevesi et Les Samoan Surfriders – Reka Reka Tahiti Records
- Daphne Walker With Bill Sevesi And His Islanders – Island Favourites – Viking – VE 53
- Daphne Walker, Buddy Wilson and Morgan Clarke - Maoriland Favourites - Armar ARE2005 - 1968

=== Compact disc ===
- The Great Daphne Walker – 2004
