= Join Together (Steve Allen song) =

Single by Steve Allen
- B-side: "Silas Peabody"
- Released: 1973
- Recorded: 1973
- Genre: Pop
- Label: Viking VS 283
- Songwriter: Steve Allen
- Producer: Keith Southern

Steve Allen singles chronology
""Top of the World""	"Join Together"	""Ain't It Nice""

"Join Together" was a hit for singer Steve Allen in 1974. The song was chosen for the Commonwealth Games that year. It was released on the Viking record label.

== Background ==
Allen had previously had a No. 1 hit in New Zealand with his version of "Top Of The World". "Join Together" was recorded in Wellington in the EMI studios in the winter of 1973. The backing track was recorded with just four musicians. It had Allen on piano, vocals and drums, Mike Conway on drums, Dave Orams on bass, and organist Mike Le Petit. The other parts were added later. It was an entrant in the Studio One competition. Competing against "Country Spring" by Larry Philip, "Take My Life" by Desna Sisarich, "Natural Man by Bunny Walters, "What Do You Do" by Lutha, and "Games Spirit" by Nash Chase, it won by a margin of 30,000. The song made it to No. 2 in the Top 20, and was kept from the No. 1 spot by Helen Reddy's 'Delta Dawn'.

The song was banned in South Africa because the words freedom, race, peace, black and white were deemed unsuitable.
