= Rodger Fox =

New Zealand trombone player and jazz band leader (1953–2024)

Rodger Fox CNZM
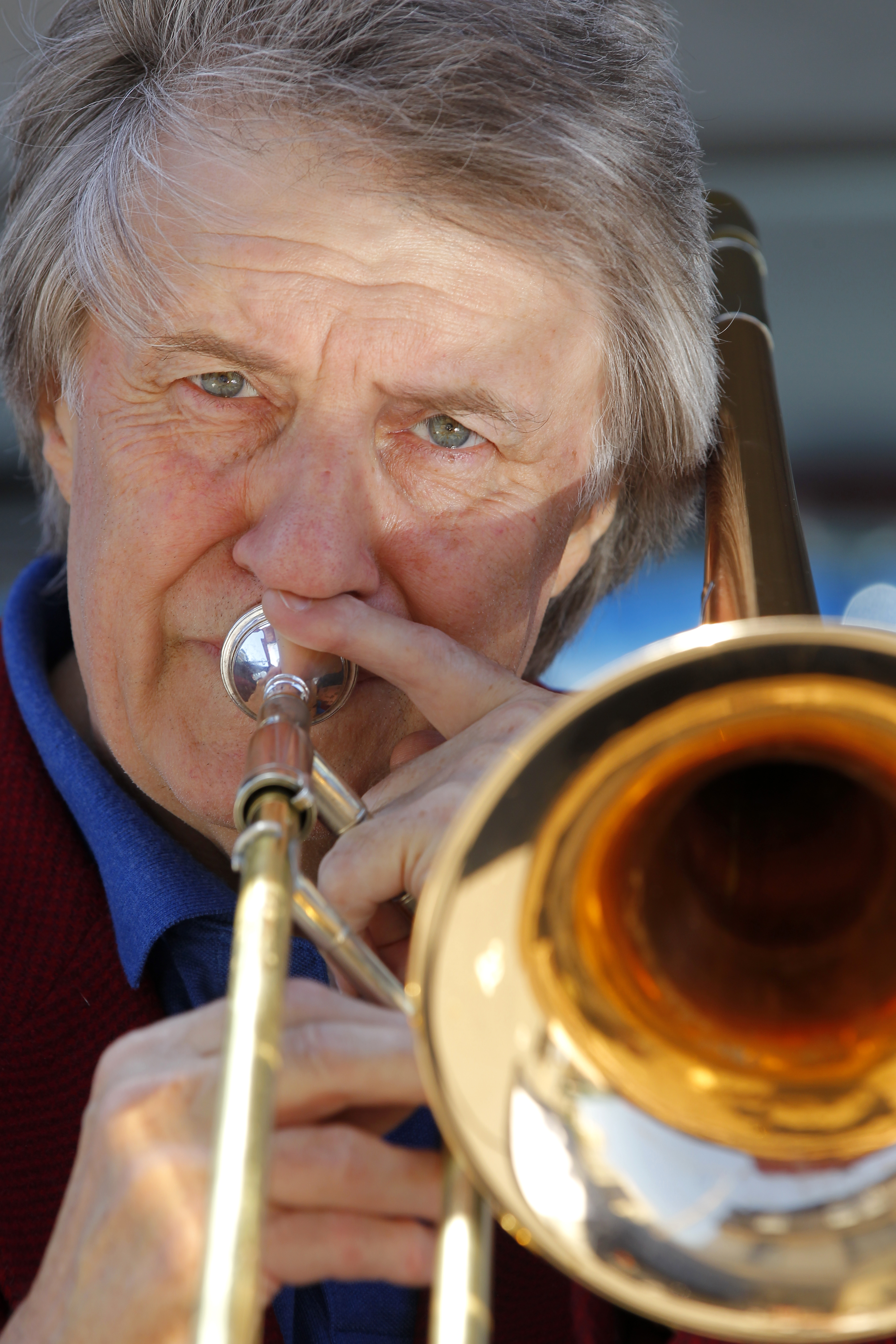
- Fox in 2012

Background information
- Born: 7 January 1953; Christchurch, New Zealand
- Died: 27 May 2024 (aged 71) Palmerston North, New Zealand
- Genres: Jazz
- Occupations: Musician, band leader, educator
- Instrument: Trombone
- Years active: 1960s–2024
- Formerly of: Quincy Conserve
- Website: rodgerfoxbigband.com

Rodger Dennis Fox CNZM (7 January 1953 – 27 May 2024) was a New Zealand trombonist, jazz educator, recording artist and leader of the Rodger Fox Big Band. He founded his jazz band in 1973 and toured extensively in New Zealand and overseas, playing at international jazz festivals including Montreux and Monterey. He was a jazz educator and taught at the New Zealand School of Music at Victoria University of Wellington.

== Early life ==
Fox was born in Christchurch in 1953, the son of Louis and Betty Fox. Both his parents were musicians. Betty taught piano and Louis played in and conducted brass bands, becoming head of music at Mana College in Wellington where his son was educated. Fox initially played the trumpet, changing to the trombone when that instrument was needed in the Mana College band. He played in the local brass band, the Wellington Youth Orchestra and the National Youth Orchestra in 1969 and 1970. He passed the Royal College of Music trombone and theory exam in 1970. His brother played the trombone and his sisters the clarinet and saxophone. On leaving school Fox worked for Chappells Music Publishing and in the Golden Horn Music shop. His favourite jazz band was Woody Herman's and he acknowledged Herman as a huge influence on his playing.

== Career ==
=== Early career ===
Fox was intending to pursue a career in classical music; he was offered a place as an orchestral trainee with the New Zealand Symphony Orchestra but brass players were not accepted onto the scheme that year as brass and woodwind players were not finding employment. Instead he joined the band Quincy Conserve, which he credited as an invaluable training ground for running a band and touring.

=== Rodger Fox Big Band ===
In 1973 Fox and Alan Nelson formed an 18 piece band, the Golden Horn Big Band, named after the music shop where he worked. At the time Fox found that older musicians were not affording younger players the opportunities to play which spurred him to start his own band. The Rodger Fox Big Band succeeded the Golden Horn band.

The Rodger Fox Big Band toured in New Zealand and overseas, playing at jazz festivals in Monterey, Montreux, Wichita and Manly. In 1978 they toured Australia. They appeared at the Montreux Jazz Festival in 1980 and 1981, the first New Zealand band to play at Montreux. In 1980 they toured in the United States and recorded an album at the Vanguard Studio in New York. The following year they toured Poland and played at Ronnie Scott's Jazz Club in London. They played at the Monterey Jazz Festival in 2001, 2006 and 2017.

Fox maintained that New Zealand does not have its own local jazz style and that jazz is an American music. In support of this view and to encourage the development of jazz playing and his initiatives in jazz education Fox brought many American jazz musicians to New Zealand to perform with his band: singer Diane Schuur, trumpeter Arturo Sandoval, pianist Bill Cunliffe, trumpeter Maynard Ferguson, saxophonist Bruce Johnstone, saxophonist Michael Brecker, trumpeter Bobby Shew, guitarist Robben Ford, singer Lydia Pense, and singer Randy Crawford. The band's 20th anniversary tour starred trombonist Bill Reichenbach, trumpeter Gary Grant, singer David Clayton-Thomas (vocalist of Blood, Sweat and Tears) and local musician Midge Marsden. Organist Joey de Francesco and singer Brenda Boykin performed with the band for the 40th anniversary tour. Fox toured New Zealand in 2023 to mark 50 years since the founding of the Big Band. The concert was called 'The Big Drum Off' and featured guest drummers Dennis Chambers, Gregg Bissonette and Peter Erskine.

=== Collaborations with other musicians ===
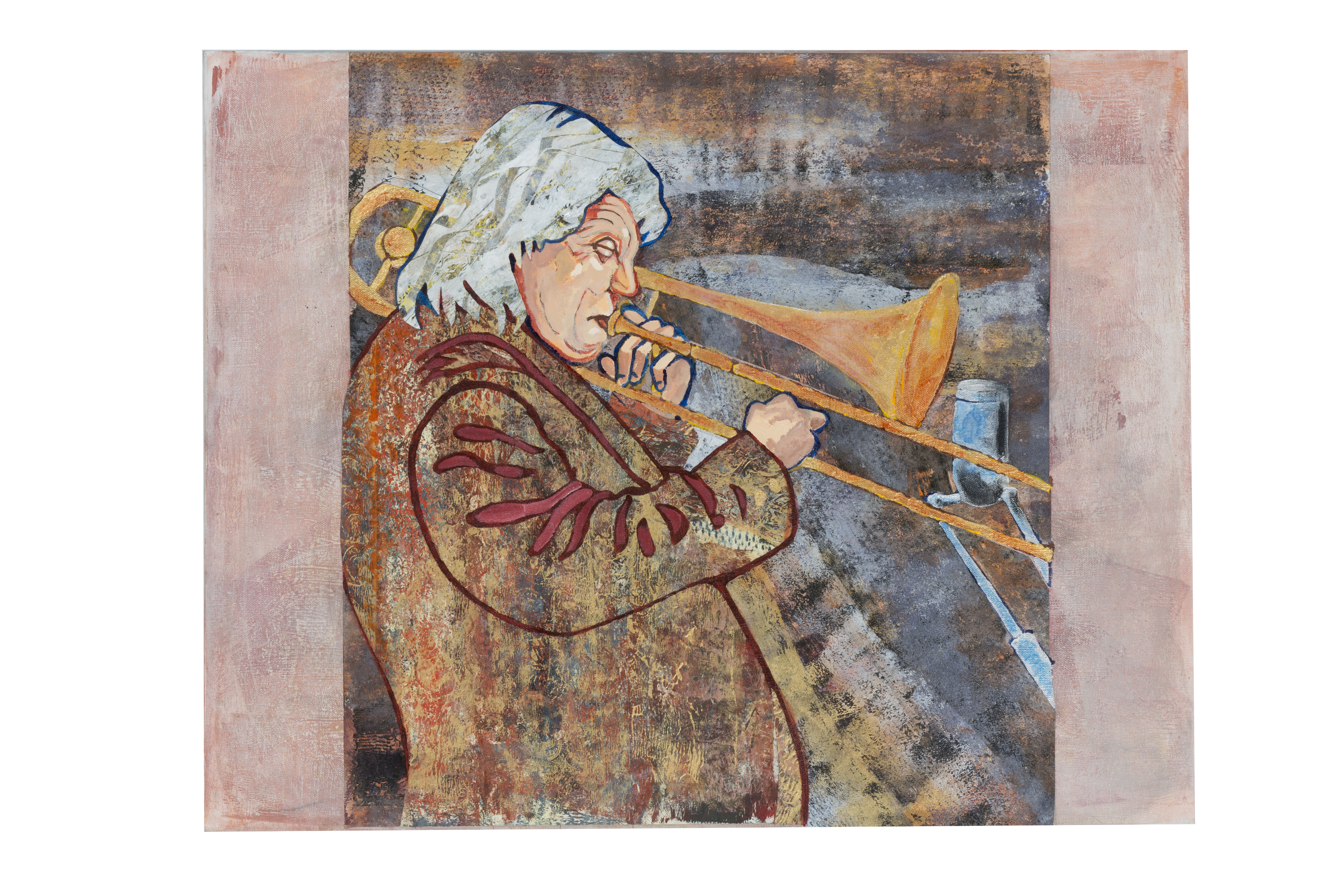
Painting on CD cover You Gotta Know, 2020

Noticing the paucity of New Zealand jazz arrangements Fox produced Reimagined! in 2022, an album of songs by New Zealand singer Dave Dobbyn. Music from the album would be used in another initiative to encourage school jazz bands to play New Zealand music. Further promotion of New Zealand artists and poets resulted in a collaboration with hip-hop artist King Kapisi in 2023 and a concert of music inspired by the poems of Hone Tuwhare in 2022.

Fox also collaborated with classical musicians. In 2016 he toured his band with the New Zealand Symphony Orchestra in a programme called Swing into Spring conducted by Hamish McKeich with trumpet and flugelhorn player Allen Vituzzi as soloist. Fox and New Zealand classical pianist Michael Houstoun worked together to record a CD Concerti in 2015. They collaborated again in 2021 at the Wellington Jazz Festival with Houstoun playing compositions and arrangements by Bill Cunliffe. In 2020 tenor Simon O'Neill performed Wagner arias accompanied by the band at a concert in Palmerston North.

=== Jazz education ===
Fox's band provided work opportunities for jazz musicians and he regarded the band as a training ground for young players. He advocated for better funding of jazz performance and for a jazz orchestra. He maintained that while the country has a national orchestra, a ballet company and regional orchestras there is no national big band to provide opportunities and employment for younger players. The band ran as a non-profit organisation with the earnings being used to promote educational opportunities, to bring musicians from overseas to work with the band, or to fund trips to jazz festivals or jazz education conferences.

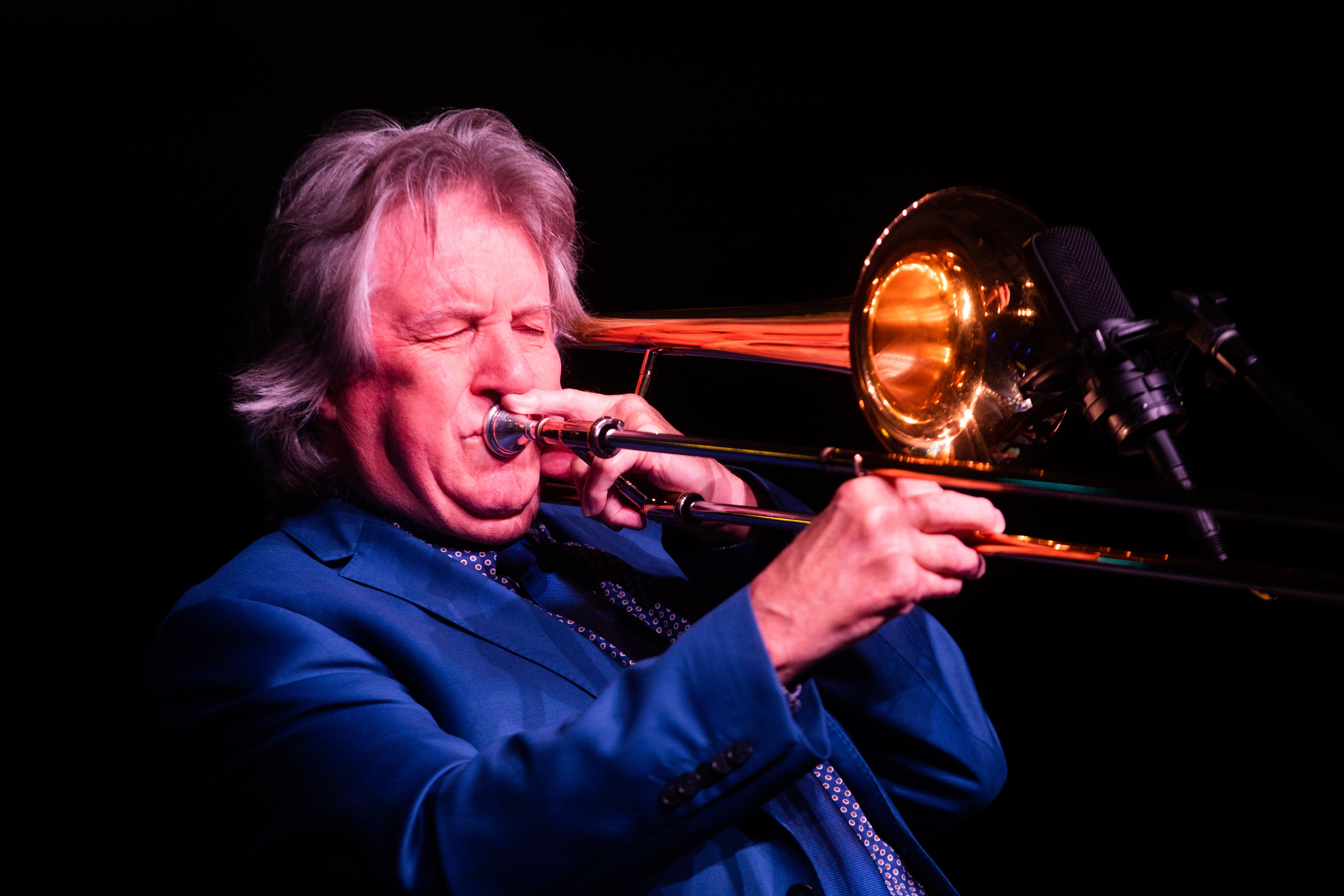
Fox performing at the Jazz Education Network Conference, New Orleans, 2020

In the early 1980s Fox, saxophonist Colin Hemmingsen and percussionist Bud Jones established the first jazz courses at the Wellington Polytechnic (later Massey University). Fox became a senior lecturer at the New Zealand School of Music in Wellington (initially a Massey University and Victoria University joint venture but later part of Victoria University).

As well as his university teaching Fox tutored and mentored young jazz musicians in schools and at other jazz workshops. In 2019 he organised a series of one day workshops and concerts around the country, delivered by the band and international musicians and educators. The aim was to give students exposure to world-class educators and performers and a greater understanding of jazz artistry.

In 1997 he attended the Jazz Educators' conference in Chicago. In 1999 he attended the Jazz Educators' Conference in Anaheim and in 2020 and 2024 the Jazz Education Network conference in New Orleans. The band's attendance at the 2024 conference was made possible by raising funds from the community after a funding application to Creative New Zealand in 2023 was turned down.

== Death ==
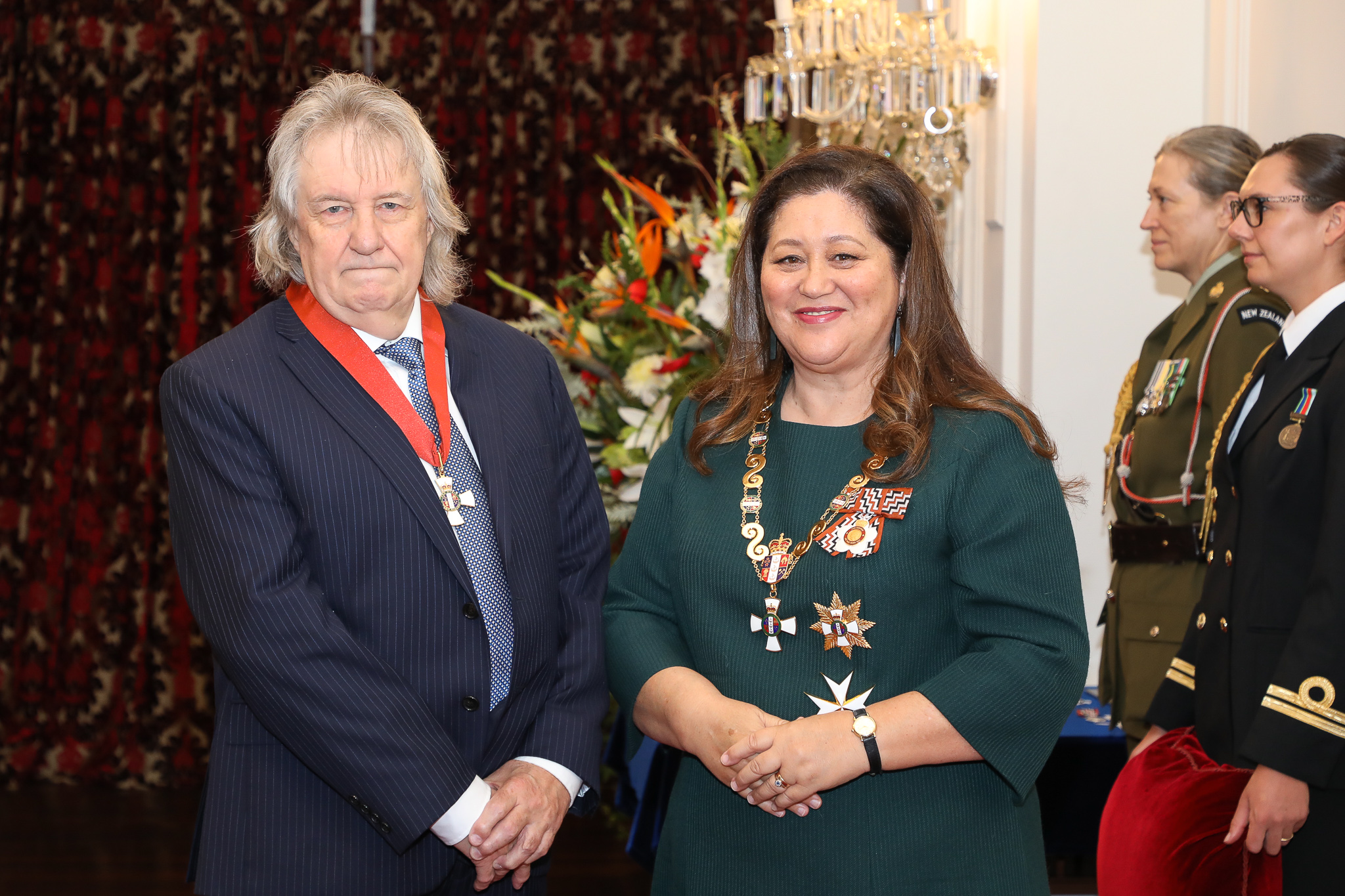
Fox on 3 May 2022 after his investiture as a Companion of the New Zealand Order of Merit by Governor-General Dame Cindy Kiro at Government House, Wellington

Fox died in Palmerston North on 27 May 2024, at the age of 71, after a short illness. Tributes acknowledged his energy, generosity, enthusiasm, his 50-year commitment to jazz performance and jazz education and his talent for inspiring young people.

== Awards and honours ==
Fox won the Aotearoa Music Award (Tui) for New Zealand jazz recording of the year on four occasions: in 1983, 2001, 2004 and 2012. In the 2003 Queen's Birthday Honours, he was appointed an Officer of the New Zealand Order of Merit, for services to music. He was conferred with an honorary doctorate (DMus) by Massey University in 2005.

In 2017 he was presented with a Scroll of Honour from the Variety Artists Club of New Zealand for his services to New Zealand entertainment.

In the 2022 New Year Honours, Fox was promoted to Companion of the New Zealand Order of Merit, for services to music.

== Selected discography ==
Year	Title	Label	Notes
2022	Reimagined!		Digital and CD
2021	Michael Houstoun/Rodger Fox Big Band Live		Digital
2021	The Rodger Fox Big Band Live at The Rogue & Vagabond		Digital
2020	You Gotta Know	T-Bone	Recorded at Bunker Studio, New York
2020	Foxpop Vol. 1		Digital. Reimagining Kiwi classics
2019	Plays New Zealand		Digital. NZ composers
2018	Hipwalk	SkyDeck	Digital
2017	Concerti	Rattle	With Michael Houstoun
2016	Funkbone Experience	SkyDeck	With Dewayne Pate and David Matthews
2016	X: Plays New Zealand	Rattle	
2015	Have Yourself A Swinging' Merry Christmas		Digital
2013	The Capitol Sessions	Capitol	The Rodger Fox Wellington Jazz Orchestra
2011	Journey Home		The Rodger Fox Wellington Jazz Orchestra
2011	Rodger Fox Big Band & Midge Marsden Are Back In Town		Digital
2007	No Exit	Manu Jazz	
2004	A Rare Connection	T-Bone	With Bill Cunliffe and Jon Papenbrook
2004	Big Blues	T-Bone	With Erna Ferry
2002	Warriors	T-Bone	With Bill Cunliffe
2000	Ain't That the Truth	T-Bone	With Jon Papenbrook
2000	Devil May Care	T-Bone	With Erna Ferry, Jon Papenbrook and Bill Cunliffe
2000	Let the Good Times Roll	T-Bone	With Midge Marsden
2000	Randy Crawford & The Rodger Fox Big Band Live In Concert		Digital
1998	Xtra Juicy : The New Zealand Collection	T-Bone	
1998	Back to Being One	T-Bone	With Bill Cunliffe, Tom Warrington, Steve Houghton, Bruce Paulson and Bill Reichenbach
1993	Good News	T-Bone	
1989	The Rodger Fox Big Band : an all-star collection 1974 to 1989	Jayrem	With Midge Marsden, David Feehan and Mary Yandall
1987	Mary Yandall and Rodger Fox	Circular Records	With Mary Yandall
1986	The Rodger Fox Big Band with Bill Reichenbach and Gary Grant	Circular Records	
1984	Something Juicy	Circular Records	With Bill Reichenbach
1981	The Rodger Fox Big Band Live : 15th Montreux Jazz Festival	Circular Records	
1981	Heavy Company	Circular Records	With Bobby Shew
1981	The New York Tapes	Vanguard	
1980	The Rodger Fox Big Band Live : 14th Montreux Jazz Festival Switzerland	Ode	
1978	Time Piece	Ode	
1977	It's A Dream	Ode	credited as "The Golden Horn Big Band"
