= What Greater Love =

Single by Nash Chase
- A-side: "What Greater Love"
- B-side: "Raindrops Keep Fallin' on My Head"
- Released: 1970
- Genre: Pop
- Label: Ode ODE-11
- Songwriter: Randazzo-Pike-Adams
- Producer: Terence O'Neill-Joyce

Nash Chase singles chronology
""Sound of Love""	"What Greater Love"	""I Will Bring You Flowers in the Morning""

"What Greater Love" was a top ten hit in New Zealand for singer Nash Chase in 1970.

== Background ==
=== The record ===
On the week ending with 5 September 1970, it was reported by the Billboard magazine that "What Greater Love" was in the New Zealand charts at position 10. The single backed with "Raindrops Keep Falling on My Head" was released on the Ode label. By 27 July 1970, the single had entered the NZ charts at no. 20. By 31 August, it had climbed from no. 17 to no. 10.

=== The singer ===
In 1970, Chase was a newcomer to the pop scene. His brother Frank had already released a single "The Frog" bw "Popeye Dance" on the Pye the previous year. In July of that year he won the Wanganui Talent Quest. In August, he won the 1970 New Faces competition. Prior to this hit, Chase had previously released a single "Sound of Love" backed with "My Special Prayer" on Ode.
