= Today I Killed a Man I Didn't Know =

Single by Nash Chase
- A-side: "Today I Killed A Man I Didn't Know"
- B-side: "World Of Lavender Lace"
- Released: 1971
- Genre: Pop
- Label: His Master's Voice H.R. 434
- Songwriter(s): (Greenaway, Cook)

Nash Chase singles chronology
""Handbags and Gladrags""	"Today I Killed a Man I Didn't Know"	""If You'd Like to Be a Lady""

"Today I Killed a Man I Didn't Know" was a top 20 hit in New Zealand for singer Nash Chase.

== Background ==
The record was released on the His Master's Voice label in June 1971. This was Chase's first release for the label. The single was backed with "World Of Lavender Lace". The single quickly became a hit on the Top 20 chart. It also became a finalist in the 1971 Loxene Gold Disc awards.
