= Steve Allen (singer) =

New Zealand singer and recording artist

- Also known as: Stevie Allen
- Born: Alan Stephenson
- Origin: New Zealand
- Genres: Pop, rock
- Years active: 1970s
- Labels: Viking, Ode
- Formerly of: The Lost Souls

Steve Allen (born Alan Stephenson) is a New Zealand singer and recording artist who found popularity as a singer during the 1970s. He is also known for the hit song "Join Together", and the song for the television commercial, "Use Your Nana".

== Background ==
Early on in his career he was the lead guitarist and vocalist with a Wellington group called the Lost Souls. He left the group in 1968 to go solo. The following year he had a single "This Old Man" bw "Just You Wait" on the His Master's Voice label. He was credited as Stevie Allen.

In 1972 the single "Life On Mars" backed with three David Gates compositions was released. The A side and the medley of "Baby I'm-A Want You", "Everything I Own" and "Diary" on the B side was produced by Don Richardson.

In 1973, he was at his peak. He had received the RATA award for Best Male Vocalist. He also had a no 1 hit with his version of The Carpenters hit "Top Of The World". The song that he wrote, Join Together" was a hit in 1973. In June that year the song was competing against songs sung by Ray Columbus, David Curtis, and Deane Waretini. It became the theme song for the 1974 Commonwealth Games.

His final single release was on the Mandrill label in 1980. The single "Out Of Control" was done in duet with Kim Hart. In 1982, he released an album of children's songs on the Ode label. By the mid-1990s, he was in Napier running a book shop.

In 2011, working as a real estate agent and having been out of the music business for two decades, he was contacted by Mark Tudehope from Christchurch. Tudehope wanted to have the song recorded again for the current times. Allen was more than happy to do it, and the song was recorded at Auckland's Montage Studio in June that year.

== Discography ==
Albums
Title	Release info	Year	Notes
That Go Well Feeling	Fontana 197	1972	
The Greatest Show On Earth	Viking SPVP120	1973	
The Kids Collection Volume 1	Ode Records (New Zealand) |		
