= Anna Leah =

New Zealand singer

- Born: Birmingham, England
- Occupation: Pop Singer
- Known for: sang the hit "Love Bug"

Anna Leah is an English-born former New Zealand pop singer. Her single "Love Bug" was a top five hit.

== Life and career ==
Born in Birmingham, England, Anna Leah released her first single in 1973. After signing to EMI, Anna had a big hit with "Love Bug" b/w "1-2-3-4-5" and it became popular with children and her next success was "Wahine" about the sinking of the ship of the same name near the shores of Wellington. Released in 1975, it peaked at #16. After relocating to Australia, Ms. Leah's singing career waned.
