= Will Crummer =

Cook Islands singer

- Origin: Cook Islands
- Genre: Polynesian music
- Years active: 1960s, 2000s–present
- Labels: Viking Records, Ode

Will Crummer is a Cook Islands singer and entertainer who was well known in the 1960s in both Auckland, New Zealand, and the Cook Islands. He released EPs and albums during the 1960s, and along with Pepe and the Rarotongans, was a pioneering Cook Islands artist. His is also the father of singer Annie Crummer.

== Background ==
In his teens, Crummer climbed coconut trees in his village to sing songs he had heard on the radio, including songs by Pat Boone and Nat King Cole. He moved to New Zealand in the early 1960s to work as a concreter, a job his brother had arranged for him.

Crummer became well known in Auckland during the 1960s when the Polynesian music scene was popular. The band he became known for fronting was Will Crummer and the Royal Rarotongans, performing at venues such as The Orange Ballroom and The Reefcomber.

He made some recordings in Auckland, his EP Rarotonga in 1962 and Cook Islands Magic the following year. He also released Romantic Rarotonga and Love Songs of Polynesia.

In 1968, Viking Records issued the compilation Action Rarotonga!, which featured his group, Will Crummer and The Royal Rarotongans, as well as Pepe and The Rarotongans.

Crummer performed in Tahiti, and Hawaii where he was offered a residency by a Hawaiian promoter. After performing there for a time, he broke his contract for personal reasons and headed back to New Zealand where he found work in warehousing. According to his daughter Annie, he gave up music to raise his family.

== Later years ==
In 2011, Ode Records released his album Shoebox Lovesongs. Produced by Nick Bollinger and Arthur Baysting, it features his old friend Dinky Ngatipa and a string arrangement by Don McGlashan. Daughter Annie and The Yandall Sisters also feature on the album.

On Saturday, 25 January 2015, Crummer and his band, Will Crummer and the Rarotongans performed aboard HMNZS Otago to an audience of around 10,000. His daughter Annie was also at the event.

== Discography ==
Single
Act	Title	Release info	Year	Notes
A) Loma avec l'orchestre Hotel Tahiti B) Will Crummer and the Seastars	"Pua'a Choux" "Omai Na To Rima"	Tahiti Records 190		

EP
Act	Title	Release info	Year	Notes
Will Crummer and the Sea Stars	Romantic Rarotonga	Viking VE 114		
Will Crummer and the Seastars	Rarotonga	Viking VE 118	1962	

LP
Act	Title	Release info	Year	Notes
Will Crummer and the Seastars	Cook Islands Magic	Viking VP 94		LP
Will Crummer and the Royal Rarotongans	Love songs of Polynesia	Viking VP 110	1963	LP
Eddie Lund and His Tahitians and Will Crummer and the "Seastars"*	Tahiti Meets Manihiki	Tahiti Records EL 1015		LP
Will Crummer and the Royal Rarotongans Pepe and the Rarotongans	Action Rarotonga	Viking VP 251		LP
Will Crummer	Shoebox Love Songs	Ode CDMANU5113	2011	CD

Various artist compilations
Title	Release info	Year	Notes
Music of the South Seas! A Visit to Tahiti, New Zealand, Rarotonga	World Records ST889		Will Crummer and The Royal Rarotongans songs: "Sinsano", "Tu Takariki", "Rarotonga"
