= Bill Sevesi =

Tongan musician

- Born: Wilfred Jeffs; 28 July 1923; Nuku'alofa, Tonga
- Died: 23 April 2016 (aged 92) Epsom, Auckland, New Zealand
- Genre: Polynesian
- Occupation: Musician
- Instruments: Steel guitar, Ukulele
- Years active: 1940s–2000s
- Labels: Viking, Armar

Wilfred Jeffs QSM (28 July 1923 – 23 April 2016), better known by the stage name Bill Sevesi, was a musician and master of the steel guitar who helped popularise Hawaiian-style music in New Zealand and the Pacific Islands.

Tongan-born Sevesi composed more than 200 songs with over 20 albums to his credit during a career spanning six decades.

He began playing the Hawaiian Steel Guitar in 1936, and in later years his band Wilfred Jeffs and the Islanders became Bill Sevesi and the Islanders. He performed all over the Pacific Islands, New Zealand, Australia and United States.

He recorded some classic favourites such as '"Bye Bye Baby Goodbye" (1958) as well as recording artists such as Daphne Walker, The Yandall Sisters and Annie Crummer.

== Early life ==
Sevesi was born in Nuku'alofa, Tonga, in 1923 and came to New Zealand at the age of nine. He saw active service during World War II and in 1944 he was in Italy. When he returned to New Zealand after the war, he resumed his career, performing with his band as 'Bill Sevesi and His Islanders'. They would play at the Orange Ballroom, in Auckland.

== Career ==
He first recorded in 1949 with Tex Morton, a country singer. They were credited as The Rough Riders. Other names he and his group "the Islanders" had recorded as were: The Astyro Trio (or a similar name) for Mavis Rivers; and The Bluemountain Boys for Luke Simmons who was a Canadian-born hillbilly singer. On Phil Warren's label, he was Will Jess with "Bye Bye Baby Goodbye". This became a big hit in 1959.

Along with fellow Tongan Bill Wolfgramm, he was a recording star on the legendary New Zealand Viking Records label.

During his career, Sevesi recorded and worked with a multitude of artists, many of whom had recorded for Viking. They include Sione Aleki, The Samoan Surfriders, George Tumahai, and Daphne Walker. His daughter, Tania, made a recording in approximately 1984 (Waikiki Tamure) only on cassette tape, in his makeshift garage/recording studio in Mt Roskill, Auckland.

== Personal life ==
Sevesi is survived by his wife Vika Jeffs, daughters Tania and Colleen Jeffs, and Wayne Jeffs from a previous marriage. Brent Jeffs (Vika's son) died 23 March 2016, one month before his father.

== Discography ==
=== Albums ===
List of demo albums
Title	Album details
Sea Breeze (as Bill Sevesi & His Islanders, Daphne Walker & George Tumahai)	Released: 1960; Label: Viking (VP37); Format: LP
Aloha Samoa (as The Samoan Surf Riders with Bill Sevesi & His Islanders)	Released: 1962; Label: Viking (VP54); Format: LP
Beyond the Reef Starring Daphne Walker (as Daphne Walker, George Tumahai, Trevor Edmondson with Bill Sevesi & His Islanders)	Released: 1962; Label: Viking (VP90); Format: LP
Queen of the Islands (as George Tumahai, The Pacific Teenagers, Bill Sevesi & His Islanders)	Released: 1963; Label: Viking (VP98); Format: LP
Rhythm of the Islands (as Daphne Walker, George Tumahai, Trevor Edmondson, Bill Sevesi & His Islanders)	Released: 1963; Label: Viking (VP114); Format: LP
Rhythm of the Islands (as Daphne Walker, George Tumahai, Trevor Edmondson, Bill Sevesi & His Islanders)	Released: 1963; Label: Viking (VP114); Format: LP
Polynesian Guitar (with Bill Wolfgramme & Trevor Edmondson)	Released: 1964; Label: Viking (VP126); Format: LP, Cassette
South Sea Island Magic (as Daphne Walker, George Tumahai With Bill Sevesi & His Islanders)	Released: 1965; Label: Viking (VP114); Format: LP
Hawaiian Affair (with Bill Wolfgramme & Trevor Edmondson)	Released: 1966; Label: Viking; Format: LP, Cassette
Hawaiian Guitar Favourites (as Bill Sevesi And His Islanders)	Released: 1972; Label: Viking (338); Format: LP, Cassette
Polynesian Romp (as Bill Sevesi And His Islanders)	Released: 1972; Label: Viking (342); Format: LP, Cassette
Polynesian Romp (as Bill Sevesi And His Islanders)	Released: 1972; Label: Viking (342); Format: LP, Cassette
Our Serenade (as The Bill Sevesi Team featuring Tommy Stowers)	Released: 2001; Label: Rajon Music Group (RBSCD600); Format: CD
Thank You for Making My Day (as The Bill Sevesi Team featuring Tommy Stowers)	Released: 2002; Label: Rajon Music Group (RBSCD601); Format: CD
The Great Bill Sevesi	Released: 2002; Label: Rajon Music Group (CDR0005); Format: 3xCD; Greatest hits
Bamboo Island (as The Bill Sevesi Team featuring Tommy Stowers)	Released: 2004; Label: Rajon Music Group (RBSCD605); Format: CD
Polynesia (The Very Best of Bill Sevesi)	Released: 2013; Label: Sony Music (88883753012); Format: CD; Greatest hits
25 Hawaiian Favourites	Released: August 2013; Label: Frenzy Music (CDMANU5157); Format: CD; Greatest hits

== Awards ==
Sevesi won numerous awards and honours, including the Queens Service Medal for public services in the 1995 Queen's Birthday Honours, the Jerry Byrd Lifetime Achievement Award (1998) from the Steel Guitar Players Hall of Fame in Missouri, and a Lifetime Achievement Award at the New Zealand Pacific Music Awards in 2006.

In 2009 he was presented with the Nostalgia Award from the Variety Artists Club of New Zealand.

Sevesi was inducted into the New Zealand Music Hall of Fame as APRA's 2015 inductee at the 2015 APRA Silver Scroll Awards in September 2015.

=== Aotearoa Music Awards ===
The Aotearoa Music Awards (previously known as New Zealand Music Awards (NZMA)) are an annual awards night celebrating excellence in New Zealand music and have been presented annually since 1965.

Year	Nominee / work	Award	Result	Ref.
2015	Bill Sevesi	New Zealand Music Hall of Fame	inductee	
