= Bill Wolfgramm =

- Born: 7 October 1925
- Origin: Tonga
- Died: 25 September 2003 (aged 77)
- Genres: Pacific island, Hawaiian
- Occupation: Musician
- Years active: 1950s–1990s
- Labels: Viking, Tanza, Zodiac

Bill Wolfgramm (7 October 1925 — 25 September 2003) aka Bill Wolfgramme was a musician specialising in lap steel guitar and popular Hawaiian music. He was born in the island kingdom of Tonga and was also of German descent. He is the former leader of Bill Wolfgramm & His Islanders, a popular island band in New Zealand that played regularly at the Orange Ballroom, a historic dance venue in Auckland.

== Background ==
He was born in Vava'u. As a teenager he was a member of a band whose lead guitarist was the nephew of Charlie Sanft a well known Tongan steel guitar player and teacher. At that time he was playing ukulele and rhythm guitar. He started playing the steel guitar at 19 years old. At age 23, Wolfgramm immigrated to New Zealand.

His first recording was Fijian Holiday and released as Mavis Rivers with Bill Wolfgramm and His Rhythm on the Tanza label. A big draw card on the live music scene, he was also a major recording star in New Zealand during the 1950s. During the 1950s when the transition from 78 rpm records to 33 rpm records was taking place, Bill Wolfgramm & His Islanders recorded South Sea Rhythm at Auckland's Astor Recording Studios. This album took four months to record and it featured Daphne Walker. It has the distinction of being one of the first long-playing 33 rpm records to be pressed in New Zealand. There is a belief by some that this album may have been the first. He carried on recording up to the 1970s, and active up until the early 1990s.

He died twelve days before his 78th birthday.

Wolfgramm was the uncle of the Wolfgramm family in the USA who formed the band The Jets and steel guitarist and recording artist Nani Wolfgramm, and the grandfather of The Bamboos frontman Lance Ferguson.

== Viking records ==
Along with fellow Tongan Bill Sevesi he was a recording star on the New Zealand Viking Records label.

== Selected discography ==
=== 78 RPM ===
- Hagar Sisters & Bill Wolgramm's Hawaiians – Manu Rere Ai Ai / Malie – Zodiac Z-1002, 1957
- Daphne Walker & Bill Wolfgramm's Hawaiians – Polynesian Love Song / Hawaiian War Chant – Zodiac Z-1005, 1957

=== 45 RPM ===
- Daphne Walker – Gay Hawaiian Party / Bill Wolfgramm – Hawaiian War Chant – Zodiac Z-1066, 1961
- The Bill Wolfgramm Group – Shining Waters (Vocal by Millie Bradfield) / My Lovin' Boy (vocal by The Litia Daveta Group) – His Master's Voice HR 138 – 1960

=== TANZA Releases ===
==== 45RPM ====
- Let Me Hear You Whisper / Maori Love Song – TANZA ZF 255 – 1955
- Minoi Minoi (Wriggle Wiggle) / South Sea Rose (with Daphne Walker) – TANZA ZF 279 – 1956
- Vana Vana / Lonely Hula Girl – TANZA ZF 283 – 1956
- Lonely Kiwi / Maori Style – TANZA ZF 293 – 1956

=== Viking Releases ===
==== LPs ====
- Guitar Sounds of the South Pacific, SPVP 113 (1973) (LP)
- Sounds of Hawaii, SPVP 122 (1973) (LP)
