= Rourururoa Une =

Cook Islands footballer

Personal information
- Full name: Rourururoa Une
- Place of birth: Cook Islands
- Position: Midfielder

Team information
- Current team: Nikao Sokattack

Senior career*
Years	Team	Apps	(Gls)
2003–	Nikao Sokattack		

International career^{‡}
2004–	Cook Islands	3	(0)
- * Club domestic league appearances and goals as of 29 July 2013 ‡ National team caps and goals as of 29 July 2013

Rourururoa Une is a footballer who plays as a midfielder. He currently plays for Nikao Sokattack F.C. in the Cook Islands Round Cup and the Cook Islands national football team.
