= Nat Mara =

French Polynesian-New Zealand pilot and musician

Nu'utaivava Natapu Mara (1922 - 1986), better known as Nat Mara, was a French Polynesian-New Zealand pilot, musician and band leader.

Mara was born in Rurutu in the Austral Islands in 1922. At the start of World War II he moved to New Zealand with a group of Tahitian volunteers to join the Royal New Zealand Air Force. After training in Canada and the United Kingdom he joined the Free French Air Forces. He served as a wireless operator and air gunner in the Lorraine Squadron, flying 51 sorties and receiving numerous decorations, including the lanyard of the Legion of Honour. He met and married Joyce Elizabeth Riley (1921-1959) in England during World War II. They emigrated from England to Rurutu and then to New Zealand in 1948. They had two children. He remarried after Joyce's death around 1958 and had three more children with his second wife.

Following the war he returned to French Polynesia briefly to work as a radio operator and meteorologist, before moving to Auckland. In Auckland he founded the Tahiti Nui Society and worked as a translator, a hatmaker, and on the wharves. He led the group Nat Mara and His Tahitians, which made numerous LPs of Tahitian music with Viking Records in Auckland. He later led a Tahitian hula dance troupe that included his daughter Diane, and performed in Auckland and throughout the Pacific in the late 1960s.

Recordings by Nat Mara and His Tahitians are frequently reissued and broadcast. Several of the group's tracks are considered standards within Polynesian music.

He died in Auckland in 1986.

== Honours ==
- Knight of the Ordre national du Mérite
- Médaille militaire
- Croix de guerre (1939–1945)
- Resistance Medal
- Commemorative medal for voluntary service in Free France
