= Jacqueline Evans (conservationist) =

Cook Islander marine conservationist (born c.1971)

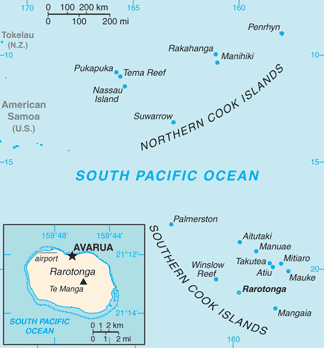
Cook Islands

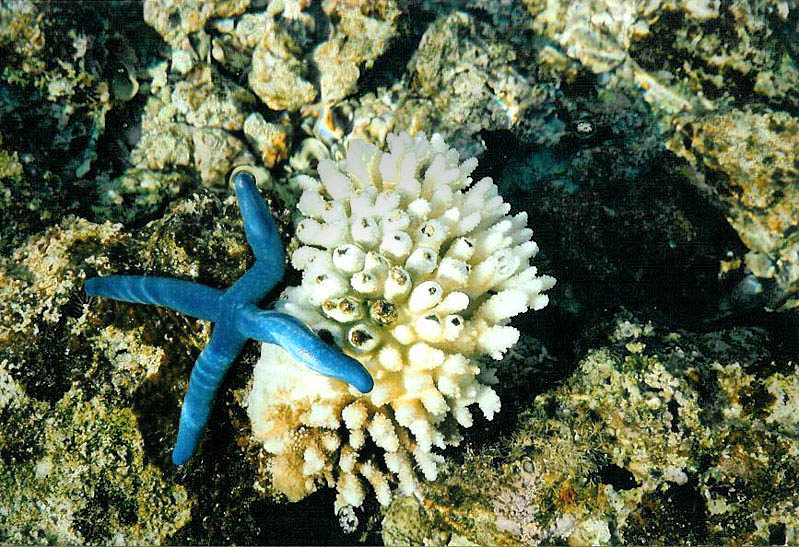
Cook Islands reef

Jacqueline (Jacqui) Evans (born c. 1971) is a Cook Islander marine conservationist. Her efforts to protect the marine environment surrounding the islands came to fruition in July 2017 when the government created the Marae Moana marine park. It provided for the sustainable management of 763,000 square miles (1.98 million km^{2}) of ocean territory, including 15 more highly protected exclusion zones covering 125,000 (324,000 km^{2}). In recognition of her efforts, in April 2019 Evans was one of six environmentalists to be awarded the Goldman Environmental Prize.

== Early life and education ==
Born c. 1971, Evans is the daughter of Mereana Henry from the Cook Islands and the late Roger Evans from England. She was raised in Masterton, New Zealand, together with her six elder siblings. When she was 15, she moved to the Cook Islands with her parents. They settled in Tupapa on the island of Rarotonga where she completed her school education at Tereora College. From 1993, she attended the University of the South Pacific in Fiji, graduating with a BSc in environmental studies in 1995. Later, she earned an MA in geography from the University of Hawaii at Manoa (2001–2004).

== Career ==
Evans' interest in marine life began when she went on school trips to the nearly lagoon as a 16-year-old. While snorkeling, she was struck by the beauty of the coral and the colourful fish. It was then she decided to become a marine conservationist.

After first working as a fisheries surveillance officer, she was employed by the Cook Islands Conservation Service. In 2005, she joined the Ministry of Health where she monitored the effects of waste water on the maritime environment. Five years later, she was appointed programme manager at the environmental NGO Te Ipukarea Society, liaising with government agencies on the development of structures for the marine park. The goal was reaching a balance between the use of natural resources and the needs of conservation.

Striving to gain public support for the marine park, she travelled extensively throughout the islands with government and NGO experts, building up trust with local communities. Working with a legal advisor, she organized a competition leading to the choice of "Marae Moana" (Sacred Ocean) as the name of the park. She also benefited from the collaboration of Kevin Iro, a former rugby player and a member of the tourist board.

Despite a number of obstacles, on 13 July 2017 the government adopted the Marae Moana Act covering the sustainable management of the Cook Islands ocean territory. Evans has now taken up responsibility for the project as director of the Marae Moana Coordination Office, overseeing its implementation.

In recognition of her achievements, in April 2019 Jacqueline Evans was awarded the Goldman Environmental Prize for her work on preserving marine biodiversity and protecting Cook Island traditions.

In January 2020, she set up the Moana Foundation to support NGOs in the Cook Islands.
