= Ray Woolf =

English-born New Zealand entertainer

Ray Woolf MNZM
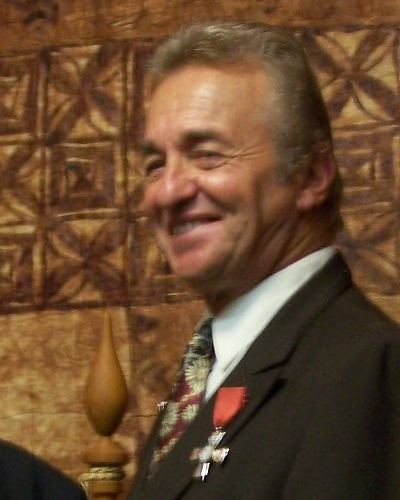
- Woolf at his investiture in April 2008
- Born: Raymond Frederick Woolf; November 13, 1944 (age 81); Dagenham, Essex, UK
- Occupations: Singer, actor, entertainer

Ray Woolf MNZM (born 13 November 1944) is an English-born New Zealand singer, actor and television presenter. His career has encompassed popular music, cabaret, television, musical theatre and film. He became a prominent entertainer in New Zealand during the 1960s and 1970s and continued to work in television, theatre and film into the 21st century.

== Early life and career ==
Woolf was born in Dagenham, Essex, on 13 November 1944. As a teenager he began performing with local rock and roll bands. In 1962, aged 17, he emigrated with his family to New Zealand, settling in Auckland.

=== Music career ===
After arriving in New Zealand, Woolf was introduced to Phil Warren, who invited Eldred Stebbing, who became Woolf's first NZ manager and signed him to Zodiac Records. He subsequently toured New Zealand as a supporting act for British singer Helen Shapiro.

During the 1960s, Woolf performed with the band Ray Woolf and the Avengers and released a number of singles. He subsequently developed a career as a solo performer, working in cabaret, popular music and jazz. Woolf became a regular performer on the New Zealand hotel and entertainment circuit and established a reputation as a versatile vocalist. His recordings included the album Once Upon a Time (1972), as well as recordings with the Roger Fox Big Band. His earlier recordings were later collected on The Sixties Collection.

In 1975, Woolf was named New Zealand Entertainer of the Year. He was subsequently named Best Television Light Entertainer for four consecutive years from 1977 to 1980.

=== Television ===
Woolf became a familiar figure on New Zealand television during the 1960s and 1970s. He appeared on music and variety programmes including C'mon and Happen Inn and was a presenter on the children's programme Play School.

In the late 1970s he was given his own variety programme, The Ray Woolf Show, which screened on South Pacific Television. The programme subsequently continued as The New Ray Woolf Show. Woolf also appeared as a presenter and guest on a range of other New Zealand television programmes.

He later worked as an actor and presenter, with appearances in New Zealand television series including Marlin Bay, Shortland Street and Nothing Trivial. He also appeared in the television series Hercules: The Legendary Journeys and Xena: Warrior Princess, both of which were produced in New Zealand.

=== Theatre ===
Woolf developed an extensive career in musical theatre. His stage roles have included Captain von Trapp in The Sound of Music and roles in productions of The King and I, West Side Story, Blood Brothers and The Rocky Horror Show.

=== Film ===
Woolf made his feature-film debut in The Quiet Earth (1985). He subsequently appeared in a number of New Zealand productions, including The Insatiable Moon (2010). In Peter Jackson's King Kong (2005), Woolf played the helmsman of the Venture. His later film work includes the romantic comedy Stranded Pearl (2024).

== Honours ==
In 2007, Woolf received the Benny Award from the Variety Artists Club of New Zealand, recognising his contribution to New Zealand variety entertainment.

In the 2008 New Year Honours, Woolf was appointed a Member of the New Zealand Order of Merit (MNZM) for services to entertainment.

In 2010, he was inducted onto the New Zealand Walk of Fame.
