= Ode Records (New Zealand) =

Ode Records is a New Zealand record label. Artists recordings released through the label include Herb McQuay, Deane Waretini. The first release on the label was a single in 1968, "Sally I Do" by Abdullahs' Regime. The label also became an important outlet for ethnic and world music, especially music from Melanesian and Polynesian sources.

== Background ==
The label was started in 1968 by Terence O’Neill-Joyce. The genres the label has released include pop, blues, country, Jazz, new age, Maori, Pacific and world music. Around 2005, the label was purchased by Roger Marbeck of the Marbecks Record stores chain. Along with the Kiwi Pacific International Ltd, and Kiwi Records labels, Ode had a speciality in Polynesian music.

== General releases (selective) ==
=== Singles ===
- Abdullahs' Regime – "Sally I Do" / "Silver Ship" (Dedicated To Those Services Active In Vietnam) - Ode Records ODE.1 - (1968)
- Andrew - "Hand Bags And Glad Rags" / "Jordan Marsh (My Best Friend)" - ODE 3 - (1968)
- The Dizzy Limit - "Golden Slumbers / Carry That Weight" - ODE 5 - (1969)
- The Dizzy Limit - "Wrote A Song For Everyone" / "Good Golly Miss Molly" - ODE-7 - (1969)
- Nash Chase - "Sound Of Love" / "My Special Prayer" - ODE-8 - (1970)
- Nash Chase - "What Greater Love" / "Raindrops Keep Fallin' on My Head" ODE-11 - (1970)
- Nash Chase - "I Will Bring You Flowers In The Morning" / "Words" - ODE-15
- Anderson & Wise - "Anderson and Wise" / "Yo Yo Mac" - ODE-50 - (1972)
- Herb McQuay – "Oh How Happy" / "Mrs Jones" - Ode Records ODE 711 - (1980)

=== Albums ===
- Herb McQuay - You Are The One - Ode - (1981)
- Shane - Portrait 68 - Ode Records SODE 243 - (1986)
- Taj Mahal - Taj - Ode Records SODE 256 - (1986)
- Will Crummer - Shoebox Love Songs - Ode CD MANU 5113 - (2011)
- Deane Waretini - Now is the Hour - Ode CD MANU 5145 - (2012)

== World and ethnic music (selective) ==
=== Albums ===
- Patea Methodist Club - Toia - Ode Records SODE017 - 1973 (LP)
- South Taranaki Methodist Maori Cultural Group -Music of the Maori - Ode Records SODE035 - 1976 (LP)
- The First Centenary of the Methodist Church in Fiji - Ode Records SODE081 - 1976 (LP)
- Tumuenua Dance Group - Cook Island Drums, Chants and Songs - Ode VOY 1335 - (1991) (CD)
- Songs from the Second Float: Music from the Island of Takū - Recorded, compiled, and annotated by Richard Moyle. Ode Music MANU 2042 - (2005) (CD)
