= Music for Leisure =

New Zealand budget record label

- Founded: Late 1960s
- Status: Inactive
- Genre: Various
- Country of origin: New Zealand

Music for Leisure was a budget record label in New Zealand that released many compilation albums. It also handled re-releases of other labels.

== Background ==
The label was set up by John McCready who had become marketing manager for Philips Records. He created the label to supply non-traditional record outlets such as super markets. It became a big success for him and as a result he was a finalist for the New Zealand salesman of the year awards. Later under PolyGram, the label was annually releasing the Solid Gold series. Volume 28 of the series sold between 80,000 and 100,000 copies.

One of its earliest releases was 20 Solid Gold Hits which included "Burning Bridges" by the Mike Curb Congregation, and "Me You And A Dog Named Boo" by Lobo, and some New Zealand artists. Another compilation on the label was 20 Studio One Hits.
