= The Rumour (New Zealand band) =

New Zealand pop and rock music band

- Origin: Auckland, New Zealand
- Genres: Pop/Rock, Acoustic
- Years active: 1966 - present
- Labels: Zodiac, Polygram
- Members: Shade Smith, Gerard Smith, Jacques Koolen, Ross Hindman, Barry Rushton, Judy Hindman
- Past members: Colleen Ralph

The Rumour was a New Zealand pop/rock music band in the late 1960s and early 1970s. Formed in 1966 and featuring twin brothers Shade and Gerard Smith, Jacques Koolen and Ross Hindman they went on to achieve success in the NZ pop scene with chart-topping hits "L'amour Est L'enfant de la Liberte", No 1 on the New Zealand charts for four weeks and "Holy Morning". The band was at various times a duo, a trio, quartet and quintet.

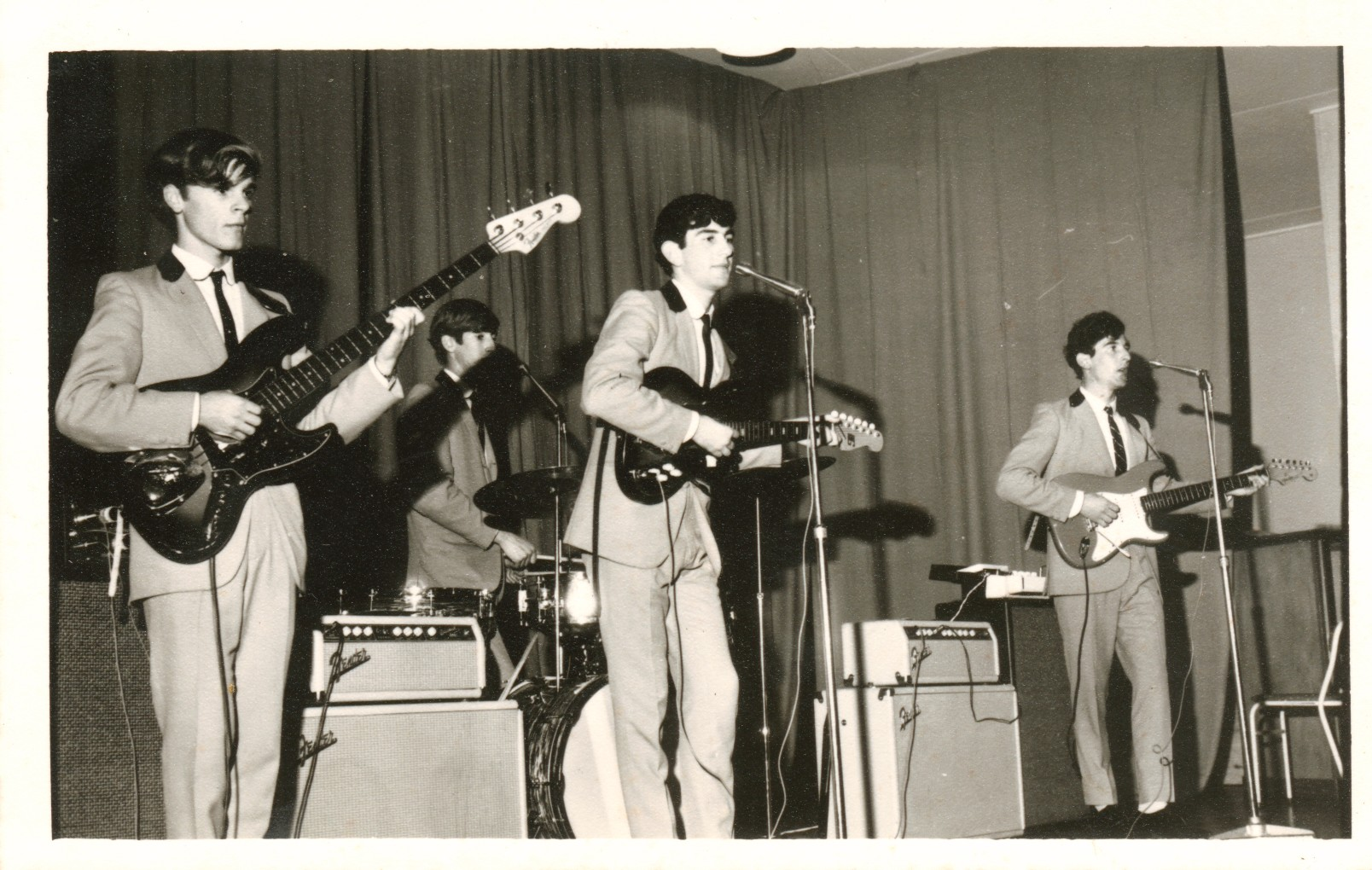
The Surfires circa 1965

== Early years ==
In New Zealand in the early 1960s, Cliff Richard and the Shadows, Buddy Holly and the Crickets and Elvis Presley were soon to be replaced in the national psyche of the new teen generation by the Beatles, the Rolling Stones and the rest of the British Pop Invasion. An awakening was underway in the new generation with this heightened level of interest in music. Bands sprang up in every town, at every school from church groups to scout clubs. In the small Waikato town of Huntly, twin brothers John (Shade) and Gerard Smith teamed up with their schoolmates and neighbours Jacques Koolen and Ross Hindman and formed a singing group which won a talent quest at Huntly College in 1962. Not long after, they became a Shadows-emulating band called The Sapphires and began performing at local and district functions, frequently in Hamilton at the Starlight Ballroom, the Waikato's entertainment mecca. Changing their name to the Surfires and moving to Auckland they recorded 3 singles on the Zodiac label at Stebbing's Recording Studio during 1966/67 "I Can't Wait For Summertime"/"Flying Saucers", "Friction"/"A True Gentleman" and "Notice Me"/"When Will The Seasons Bring". All songs were written by lead guitarist John Smith with Gerard Smith taking care of the vocals and rhythm guitar, Hindman on bass and Koolen on drums.

== 1968 - 1974 ==
The move to Auckland coincided with Hindman leaving to go to Otago University so the band changed tack and brought in Colleen Ralph to strengthen the vocal line-up. The band quickly came to the attention of artist manager Ray Columbus who changed the name to The Rumour at the suggestion of Dunedin radio presenter Neil Collins, and signed the group to the Polygram label. In early 1970, the group performed at Redwood 70, the first major modern music festival held in New Zealand. Their first single "What Have You Done With That Day God Gave You"/"Darling Kathy Baby" came out in 1970 and was followed by "We've Got To Learn To Live Together"/"Teach Your Children". At this point Ralph left the band and Hindman, having completed his pharmacy degree at university, rejoined.

The band's single "Garden Of Your Smile"/"We Can't Know The Reason Why" began to get airplay in early 1971. In mid 1971 their first album Garden Of Smiles was released. It wasn't until they entered the 1971 New Zealand Television songwriting contest "Studio One" and became winners, that they rose to prominence. "L'Amour est l'enfant de la Liberte (Love is the child of Freedom)" written by John Smith established the band nationwide and they frequently toured with and/or supported overseas acts such as Cilla Black, The Beach Boys, Robin Gibb, Neil Sedaka and Lobo amongst others. "L'Amour" went on to achieve double gold for sales in excess of 125,000, remarkable by NZ standards of the time. The second album Land Of New Vigour and Zeal came out in 1972 and produced two more singles, "Holy Morning"/"Two Ways To Look" and "No Money On Our Trees"/"When Will The Seasons Bring". These two songs reaching numbers 3 and 21 respectively on the national charts. A third album Holy Morning was also released in 1972. It contained songs from the first two albums, plus a few new songs. Two more singles came out in 1973, "Like Children Do"/"The Fish and the Alley Of Destruction" and "Beautiful To Me"/"Play Mama Play" before the release of the fourth album An Evening At Home - The Best Of The Rumour. By this time John "Shade" Smith was in demand as a songwriter and, despite the band's growing popularity he subsequently left the group to work as a solo artist. Gerard Smith and Koolen continued the Rumour as a duo recording several singles and the album entitled An Evening At Home. At the behest of the record company, the band went to Australia to record a single "Play Mama Play" for release in Australia and NZ but the song didn't gain traction, either in NZ or Australia. The band had reached the end of the road and decided to call it quits in 1974.

== 1974 - 1986 ==
Shade Smith released another single in 1974, "A Better Way"/"Peter Costello Theme" and there was another single by the Rumour in 1977 "Queen of Paradise" and "Precious Love" in 1983. In 1981 the ex drummer from Palmerston North band Kal-Q-Lated Risk, Barry Rushton - upon his return from Chiropractic College in USA - joined up with Gerard, Jacques and Shade to form a band called Somersault and recorded their first album "Never Lose The Wonder". This consisted mainly of songs written by Gerard. In 1984 the band recorded a second album "Somersault USA" in Los Angeles which only made it to the "demo vinyl" stage. The Rumour first re-grouped in 1985 to perform on a Television New Zealand programme "25 Years Of New Zealand Television" which showcased the first 25 years of television in New Zealand.

== 1987 - present ==
Subsequently, the original Rumour members together with Barry Rushton and Judy Hindman (née Donaldson) (The Chicks) got together in 1987 to perform as a 60's and 70's rock and roll band and have been performing ever since as The Rumour. In 2009 a compilation CD entitled "The Rumour Collection" was released.

== Discography ==
=== Albums ===
- 1971: Garden Of Smiles
- 1972: Land of New Vigour and Zeal
- 1972: Holy Morning
- 1973: An Evening at Home (The Best of The Rumour)
- 2009: The Rumour Collection (CD)

=== Singles ===
- 1970: What Have You Done With That Day God Gave You/Darling Kathy Baby
- 1970: We've Got To Learn To Live Together/Teach Your Children
- 1970: Garden of Your Smile/We Can't Know the Reason
- 1971: L'Amour Est L'Enfant De La Liberte/Nobody Knows - NZ #1
- 1972: Holy Morning/Two Ways to Look - NZ #3
- 1972: The Life Of A Story/Beautiful To Me (Shade Smith)
- 1972: Woman In My Life/I've Got To Stay (Shade Smith)
- 1973: Play Mama Play/Beautiful To Me - AUS #47
- 1973: Like Children Do/The Fish and the Alley Of Destruction
- 1977: Queen of Paradise/Memory of Mary
- 1977: Dancing Feet/When Love Flies Out The Window
- 1983: Precious Love
