= Viking Records =

New Zealand independent record label

- Genre: Polynesian music, Ethnic Music, Pop Music, Rock and Roll, Country
- Country of origin: New Zealand
- Location: New Zealand

Viking Records was an independent record label that featured many New Zealand and Polynesian recording artists.

== Background ==
The company was founded in 1957. In the 1960s, the company was the largest locally owned record label in the South Pacific with its New Zealand head office in Wellington and a branch in Sydney. The label recorded an extensive range of Pacific music from New Zealand, Samoa, Fiji, Tahiti and Tonga. This record label was the largest supplier of Pacific Island and Māori music in New Zealand. Other labels to come close in output were Salem Records and Hibiscus Records.

Its headquarters was in Wellington, New Zealand and owned by Ron Dalton and Murdoch Riley. A third partner Jim Staples operated the Sydney, Australia branch. In the early 1960s another company Sevenseas Publishing Pty Ltd was set up to publish sheet music and books. In this late 1960s this company merged with Viking Records to become Viking Sevenseas NZ Ltd.

== History ==
In 1962 in an effort to branch out, Ron Dalton and Murdoch Riley were in New York conferring with Walter Hofer to distribute American Independent records in Australia and New Zealand. Dalton was intending to go to Chicago to confer with Leonard Chess. At that time Viking's extensive catalogue was largely made up of recordings from Fiji, Samoa, Tahiti and New Zealand but they were looking to make a big move into the pop music genre as well.

In 1965 and 1966, Viking Records released the winning albums for the Loxene Golden Disc awards, the forerunner of the prestigious New Zealand Music Awards. The 1965 award was won by Ray Columbus & the Invaders for the song Till We Kissed. Maria Dallas won in 1966 for the song Tumblin' down.

Viking records also had the distinction of releasing a record by The Mauriora Māori Entertainers which happened to be the very first Māori record released in Stereo.

== Recording artists ==
Among its most famous were Tongan steel guitarists Bill Sevesi and Bill Wolfgramm, Pepe and the Rarotongans and Tahitian-based Eddie Lund who was a pianist from Oregon. Other famous artists were Peter Posa, Maria Dallas, The Beau-Marks and Dinah Lee. Some of its records were also issued in Australia.

== Selected LP releases ==
- Noel McKay - In Person - Viking VP 48
- Sam Cooke - Tribute To The Lady - Viking VPS.15 (1959)
- Dinah Lee - Introducing Dinah Lee - Viking VP 140 (1964)

== Māori artists ==
On 26 June 1964, the Ohinemutu Māori Cultural Group were recorded at Ohinemutu's Tama-te-Kapua Meeting House, which was a well known location. They were an eight-person group led by Hamuera Mitchell. The recording included females singing in a modern style with guitar backing. One album Ratana Presents by the Ratana Senior Concert Party was a mixture of traditional Māori tunes on side one and English language songs sung in Māori on side two. The record included the chant "Kingitanga" and a song, "Paki-o-Matariki". It received a good review by Alan Armstrong. In 1973, Viking released the compilation album, 20 Solid Gold Māori Songs. It featured acts such as Mauriora Entertainers, Motuiti Māori Youth Club, New Zealand Māori Theatre Trust, Ohinemutu Māori Cultural Group, Ratana Senior Concert Party, St. Joseph's Māori Girls College Choir, and Turakina Māori Girls College Choir. In addition to the concert parties and cultural clubs, popular recording artists, Isabel Whatarau Cohen and Virginia Whatarau, and Daphne Walker and George Tumahai appeared on the album.

Viking also recorded Wiki Baker on a number of occasions.

=== Selective list of recordings ===
- Ohinemutu Māori Cultural Group - Songs of the Māori Viking VP 137
- Ratana Senior Concert Party - Ratana Presents - Viking VP 256
- The New Zealand Māori Chorale – Songs Of New Zealand - Viking VP 425 - 1978

== Pacific Island artists ==
=== Cook Islands ===
Pepe and the Rarotongans

A popular act to record on Viking was Pepe and the Rarotongans, whose lead singer Pepe has the distinction of being the first Cook Islands singer to be recorded by Viking. Along with Will Crummer, they achieved a good degree of fame. They also had a short succession of hits from the late 1950s to the 1960s. According to Glenda Tuaine's Celebrate Cook Islands Tarekareka! article in Escape Magazine, like Will Crummer, they are considered Pioneers. The start of their relationship with Viking is likely due to a non-event in the late 1950s. Sonny Terei, was to back a female singer in an Auckland recording studio. Due to the singer not turning up for the recording session, Sonny's wife Pepe was asked by the producer if she could take part in the session.

By 1964, they had at least two albums issued on the Viking label. The albums were Rarotonga Calling. and Passion Flower, details of which appeared in the Pacific Islands Monthly magazine. In 1965, they had a release on the Salem label.

Nat Mara

Nat Mara who played on Rarotonga Calling for Pepe and the Rarotongans also had releases under his own name. The music was Tahitian themed rather than Cook Island themed. On Viking he had an album, Peeping At Papeete Viking VP 80, and EPs, A Taste Of Tahiti Viking VE 109 and La Tahitienne Viking VE 122, which featured well known steel guitarist Bill Wolfgramme. He also had an album Welcome to Tahiti which was released on the Olympic label.

List of Cook Islands recordings (selective)

- Pepe and the Rarotongans - Passion Flower - Viking VP 89 - 1962
- Will Crummer and the Seastars - Cook Islands Magic - Viking VP 92 - 1962
- Various artists - Moments In Rarotonga - (recorded by Harry Napa) - Viking VP 100 - 1963

=== Fiji ===
List of Fijian releases (selective)

- Meet Me in Fiji - Authentic Fijian music recorded at the Fiji Mocambo Hotel - Viking VP 165

=== Samoa ===
One of the popular bands was The Samoan Surfriders. Evolving out of a rock & roll band Rudy & The Crystals who had recorded a song in the Surf genre, "Surf City", the band was made up of German-Samoan brothers Rudy and Hugo Spemann, Eddie Eves and Horst Stunzner. Another member who seems to have been ad-hoch was Malu Natapu. During the 1960s they recorded two albums and two extended play worth of material that was released under their name, as well as backing Daphne Walker on a record produced by Eddie Lund. Around the mid-1960s, their album Let Me Hear You Whisper was released on Viking. They also appeared on the Viking compilations, Action Samoa, with Edison Heather and his Samoans, and The Grey Sisters, and The Beat of the Pacific which included George Tumahai, Daphne Walker, Richard Santos, and Bill Sevesi's Islanders. Hugo Spemann died in 2005. In 2015, 81 year old Rudy Spemann was pictured in a garden holding the electric guitar he custom built in the late 1950s or early 1960s.

List of Samoan LP releases (selective)

- Samoa: Illustrated booklet and recordings (2 LP) - Viking VSP 19/20
- The Samoan Surfriders with Bill Sevesi & his islanders - Aloha Samoa - Viking VP 54
- Various artists - The Beat of the Pacific - Viking VP 64
- Malu and the Samoan Planters - Samoa - Viking VP 112
- The Samoan Surfriders- Let Me Hear You Whisper - Viking VP 133
- The Grey Sisters with Edison Heather and his Samoans - Samoa Sings -Viking VP 171
- Various artists - Action Samoa - Viking VP 246

List of Samoan EP releases (selective)

- The Samoan Surfriders - My Samoan Maiden - Viking VE 164

=== Tahiti ===
List of Tahitian releases (selective)

- Eddie Lund and his Tahitians - Lure of Tahiti - Viking VP 14
- Eddie Lund and his Tahitians - Meet Me in Tahiti - Viking VP 21
- Eddie Lund and his Tahitians - Echoes from a Distant Lagoon - Viking VP 40
- Eddie Lund and his Tahitians - Haka Moko - Viking VP 56
- Eddie Lund and his Tahitians - Letʻs Dance Tahitian - Viking VP 60
- The Royal Tahitian Dancers and Singers - The Tahitians - Viking VP 78
- Nat Mara and his Tahitians - Peeping at Papeete - Viking VP 80
- Eddie Lund and his Tahitians - Polynesie Francaise - Viking VP 85
- The Papeete Players - Wild Wild Tahiti - Viking VP 87
- Ensemble Tahitien Tahiti - Dance to the Tamoure Tahiti - Viking VP 319
