= Desna Sisarich =

- Born: Desna Sisarich; 1947 (age 78–79); New Plymouth, New Zealand
- Genres: Rock, pop, folk music, jazz
- Occupations: Singer, songwriter, musician
- Instruments: vocals, guitar, piano
- Years active: 1964–78
- Labels: His Master's Voice, Ode Records

Desna Sisarich (born c. 1947) is a New Zealand pop singer who released a handful of songs in the 1970s. She was one of New Zealand's first woman singer/songwriters.

== Biography ==
Sisarich was born in New Plymouth to Croatian parents. Learning piano and guitar at a young age, her musical talent was not always obvious to her school peers due to her shyness and reluctance to perform publicly. She won The Auckland Easter Show Top Song Contest talent show in 1964, and subsequently began singing with New Plymouth band the Nitelites while working as a court reporter for the Transport Licensing Authority. In 1968 she appeared on the New Faces portion of the New Zealand talent show Studio One, and also had one of her compositions performed by Yolande Gibson.

In the early 70s Sisarich relocated to Wellington and worked at Victoria University of Wellington. There, she was in demand as a session vocalist and sang on many radio and television ads. She was one of the main characters in the Wellington-based rock opera Jennifer in the early 1970s. In 1972 and 1973 she released three singles under her own name, Thought He Was a Friend of Mine, Some Time in the Morning and Take My Life, and had three songs on a rare live album recorded at the Christchurch Town Hall with Lutha, Blerta and Quincy Conserve. She was a support act for Kenny Rogers and the First Edition.

In the 1970s she and her long-time partner, drummer (and later music historian) Roger Watkins became involved in managing the Wellington rock music venue Ziggy's. The club, largely financed by her day job, ran at a loss, and eventually folded in the late 70s. Her last release was a 1976 New Zealand promotional record entitled You're Our Way, Naturally New Zealand, and her last television appearance was in 1978 on Song for the Pacific, recorded at the Christchurch Town Hall. She has since retired from music.
