= The Radars =

New Zealand musical group

- Years active: 1962–2007
- Past members: Ray Lemon; Andrew Taylor; Neville Toura; Harvey Baker; Feau Halatau

The Radars were a New Zealand group that was made up of mainly visually impaired musicians. They backed Deane Waretini on his no 1 hit "The Bridge" in 1981, and they won the Best Polynesian Album award at the 1983 New Zealand Music Awards. They played mainly around Auckland.

== Background ==
=== 1960s ===
The group was started in or around 1962 by Niuean born drummer, Feau Halatau and four fellow students from the Parnell Institute for the Blind. The first gig they were paid for was a wedding, and according to the drummer Halatau, they were paid a couple of pounds each. Around November 1966, they were the resident band at a dance hall in the Auckland suburb of Ōtāhuhu. They backed singers Ricky May and John Rowles during their residency at the Picasso club. Their residency lasted until 1967. In 1967, their single, "Don't Get Around Much Anymore" was released on the Zodiac label. During the 60s the group had appeared on television on the talent show Have a Shot.

=== 1970s ===
By the mid-1970s, when their residency at the Gluepot in Ponsonby had come to an end, they had been performing there for seven years.

=== 1980s ===
In 1981, some members from the band, along with former Quincy Conserve trumpet player Kevin Furey backed Deane Waretini on "The Bridge", which was written by George Tait" for Waretini. The song was a number 1 hit in New Zealand. The song, originally released on the Innovation label, and later CBS was credited to Deane Waretini with The Rising Stars. In an article by The New Zealand Herald, the group was possibly erroneously referred to as The Rising Suns. By early 1983, there were just two of the original members left in the band.

Having a hit

Using a tactic first employed by Gary Havoc & The Hurricanes, and then later by Deane Waretini, with Waretini's having the record peddled on the street, they financed their own recording of a single. Like Waretini, they took it to the street to promote and even got family members to sell it. On the 27th of February, their version of "That Lucky Old Sun" entered the N.Z. charts at no 20. It spent 6 weeks in the charts, peaking at no 20. On 24 July, their version of "The Banana Boat Song" made it to no 35 and stayed in the charts for a week. In that year, they also won an award for "Best Polynesian Album" at the New Zealand Music Awards.

=== 1990s ===
In 1993, along with Ken Kincaid, they were featured in an article in the October edition of the New Zealand Musician magazine.

=== 2000s ===
In December 2000, marking their fourth decade in the music business, the band appeared on stage at the Blind Musicians Festival in Parnell. The current line up at the time was Feau Halatau, Ray Lemon, Neville Tura and Andrew Taylor. For the event, they were to have singer Eleanor Wicks on keyboards. Around 2001, the band had $10,000 of their equipment stolen. They kept going for a few more years, and finally disbanded in or around 2007, with the only two surviving original members Andrew Taylor, and Feau Halatau parting company. Ray Lemon died on Monday, 14 July 2008. His service was held at a marae in Awaru, which is near Kaikohe. In January 2010, Andrew Taylor had joined the group Blue Collar Band, playing venues like the Wanderers Club in the Auckland suburb of Māngere. Dennis Kingston who was with The Radars at one stage was also in the band. Bass played Alex Constable was also in the band for a period of time. He played in a variety of bands including The North Harbour Rockers, and the cover band, 2 Flat Whites and a Mocha. In a 2009, an article in the 22 Jan edition of Auckland's Central Leader, drummer Halatau now living in Onehunga was looking to open a drumming school. He was hoping to make a documentary about the group as well.

During the career of the band, in addition to John Rowles, and Ricky May, they had also backed singer Rob Guest who died in 2008.

== Members ==
=== Original members ===
- Ray Lemon ... (Lead Guitar / Backing vocals)
- Andrew Taylor ... (Rhythm and Lead guitar)
- Neville Taura ... (Bass Guitar)
- Harvey Baker ... (Saxophone / Lead vocals)
- Feau Halatau ...(Drums / Backing vocals)

=== Others ===
- James Tapini ... (Guitar, vocals)
- Selwyn Davies ... (Bass guitar)
- Mal Edwards ... (Bass guitar)
- Billy T James ... (Vocals, guitar)
- Dennis Kingston ... (Drums)
- Alex Constable ... (Bass guitar)

== Discography ==
Singles
Title	Catalogue	Year	Notes #
"Don't Get Around Much Anymore" / "The Piper"	Zodiac Z45-1318	1967	
"Poor Boy's Dream" / "When Will I Be Loved"	Allied International JAR-570	1967	
"Heart" / "Hayride"	Allied International JAR-574	1968	
"That Lucky Old Sun" / "Tahiti Nui"	Epic ES 818	1983	
"The Banana Boat Song" / "Chulu Chululu"	Epic ES 878	1983	

== The Rising Stars ==
The Rising Stars appear to be a group related to The Radars. In 1975, the line-up consisted of Suva Huch, Neville Toura, Bobby Payne, and Allan Witana. As of May 1975, they were still the resident group at the Ellerslie Motor Inn. Toura / Taura was an original Radars member. Witana who was also a musical colleague of Radars guitarist Ray Lemon, had known him since 1957 when they met at the Parnell college for the blind. Witana had also produced "The Bridge" for Deane Waretini, the record which the Rising Stars played on.
