= Chulu Chululu =

Single by Eddie Lund & His Tahitians
- A-side: "Chululu"
- B-side: "Samoa Silasila"
- Released: 1958
- Genre: Pop, Pacific Island music
- Label: Viking Records
- Songwriter: Unknown

Eddie Lund & His Tahitians singles chronology
"Chulu Chululu"	"Isa Lei (Fijian Farewell Song)"

Chulu Chululu, sometimes referred to as Chululu, is a Fijian song that has been covered by a multitude of artists ranging from Peter Posa to Bill Sevesi & His Islanders. An English version of this song was a hit for Bill and Boyd.

== Background ==
The song of Fijian origin is considered to be very well known in Fiji and the Pacific. It is also a popular party song. The Fijian version begins with the lyrics "Chulu Chululu o lo’u manuee," with this verse repeated five times throughout the song. The song was originally composed by Sam Freedman, whose songs have been covered by The Kingston Trio, Bill Sevesi and Maria Dallas, among others.

=== Eddie Lund version ===
It was possibly first commercially released by Eddie Lund & His Tahitians and was released on record in 1958. It was released as a single on Viking Records in May 1958. The B side, "Samoa Silasila," was sung in Samoan. According to the National Public Library of New Zealand, the group that recorded it was an Auckland-based Tahitian group. It appeared on Lund's Lure of Tahiti album, which was released in 1960.

=== English version ===
The song was recorded by Bill & Boyd in Rotorua, New Zealand, in 1964. It became a hit for them and appeared on their album Songs for a cloudy afternoon. Bill Cate and Bill Robertson wrote the English version. Bill and Boyd rerecorded the song in 1974, and that version appeared as the B-side to the single, "Santa Never Made It Into Darwin." The single was recorded to raise money after the devastating 1974 cyclone that decimated Darwin.

=== Other versions ===
In 1993, a New Zealand group, The Radars, recorded their version of the song as the B-side to "The Banana Boat Song," released on the Epic label. It earned them an award in the Best Polynesian Album category, beating finalists Dalvanius and the Patea Maori Club as well as the Kaiwhaiki Cultural Club. The Wiggles also recorded their version on their Wake Up Jeff! album.

== Releases ==
Singles
Artist	Single A & B side	Release info	Year	Notes
Eddie Lund & His Tahitians	"Chululu" / "Samoa Silasila"	Viking V66 - 4	1958	
Bill and Boyd	"Chulu Chululu" / "Habit Of Loving You"	Philips BF-105	1964	
Bill and Boyd	"Santa Never Made it Into Darwin" / "Chulu Chululu"	Fable FB 234	1975	
The Radars	"The Banana Boat Song" / "Chulu Chululu"	Epic ES 878	1983	

EP
Artist	EP title	Release info	Year	Notes
Various	Tahiti Dances	Viking V126-26	1959	"Chululu" by Eddie Lund And His Tahitians
Tegu Ni Laqere Group	Fascinating Fiji	Tapa TEP. 3		
Various Artists	Our South Pacific With Air New Zealand	A1278		Licensed From Viking Records, Produced For Air New Zealand
Various	Swing South Pacific With Air New Zealand	Air New Zealand	1974	Air New Zealand promo EP
Nasilai Tropicana Group	Tropical Fiji	Viking VE.205	1965	
Orchid Islanders Entertainers	Memories Of Orchid Island	Hibiscus HE.9	1972	
Peter Posa And The Islanders	Peter Posa In Fiji	Viking VE.240		

Albums (LP)
Artist	Album title	Release info	Year	Notes
Eddie Lund & His Tahitians	Lure of Tahiti	Viking VP 14	1960	
Various Artists	Bula, A Musical Rendition Of Fijian Hospitality	Tapa TPLS.2		Also released on Viking Records.
Bill and Boyd	Songs for a Cloudy Summer Afternoon	Philips PL-O8759	1965	Also released on Philips PD-151 as Chulu Chululu
Bill Sevesi & His Islanders	Polynesian Romp Vol. 1	Festival Records – SFL-933, 185	1966	
The Fijians	The Rhythm Of Fiji	Hibiscus HLS-20		
The Vei-Lomani Group	Isa Lei	Salem Records XP5041	1967	
Various	Hawaii Sings	Musicolor Record – ML-3005	1968	
The Kabu Kei Namara Group	Fiji Playground Of The South Pacific	Salem Records XPS 5066	1970	
Voqa Kei Turaki (Voices of Turak)	The spell of Fiji	Hibiscus	1972	Produced by James Siers
Fiji Police Band	The Band Of The Fiji Police	Viking VPS183		Released on Viking VP183 (mono); Viking VPS183 (stereo)
Peter Posa And The Islanders	The Beat Of Polynesia	Viking VP190		
Fiji Military Forces Band, Fiji Mocambo Hotel Group, Nasilau Tropicana Group	Action Fiji!	Viking VP250,		Chululu by Nasilau Tropicana Group
The Nakamakama Villagers	Unique Fiji	Viking VP272		Also released on Olympic OL-6159
Various Artists	20 Golden Songs Of Fiji Vol. 2	Viking VP 424	1978	"Chulu Chululu" by Suva Fijian Drama Group
Kabu Kei Vuda Entertainers	Exciting Fiji	World Record Club R-05738	1978	

Albums (Cassette)
Artist	Album title	Release info	Year	Notes
Various Artists	20 Golden Songs Of Fiji Vol 2	Viking VPS 424C	1978	
Fiji Military Forces Band, Fiji Mocambo Hotel Group, Nasilau Tropicana Group	Action Fiji!	Viking VPS250C		"Chululu" by Nasilau Tropicana Group

Albums (CD)
Artist	Album title	Release info	Year	Notes
Conua Entertainment Group	Fijian Melodies	SPR 18		Manufactured for exclusive distribution by Motibhai Group, Fiji
Various Artists	Tahiti Belle Epoque: All Time Tahitians Favorites	Playasound 65807	1994	Chulu Chululu by Eddie Lund
Various Artists	Turtle Island: Fiji – Musical Memories	Turtle Island Records 94	1994	
Various Artists	Colors of the World: Fiji	Allegro Corporation 103	1999	
Various Artists	Voyager Series: Memories of Fiji	Columbia River Entertainment Group 140155	2002	
Various Artists	World Music of Hawaii and Polynesia	Sharp Edge Records	2015	"Chulu Chululu" by Mila

Digital
Artist	Album title	Release info	Year	Notes
Pan Pacific Singers	Ports of the Pacific: 20 Favourites	K-Tel	2010	
