= Leys Institute =

Public library in Auckland, New Zealand

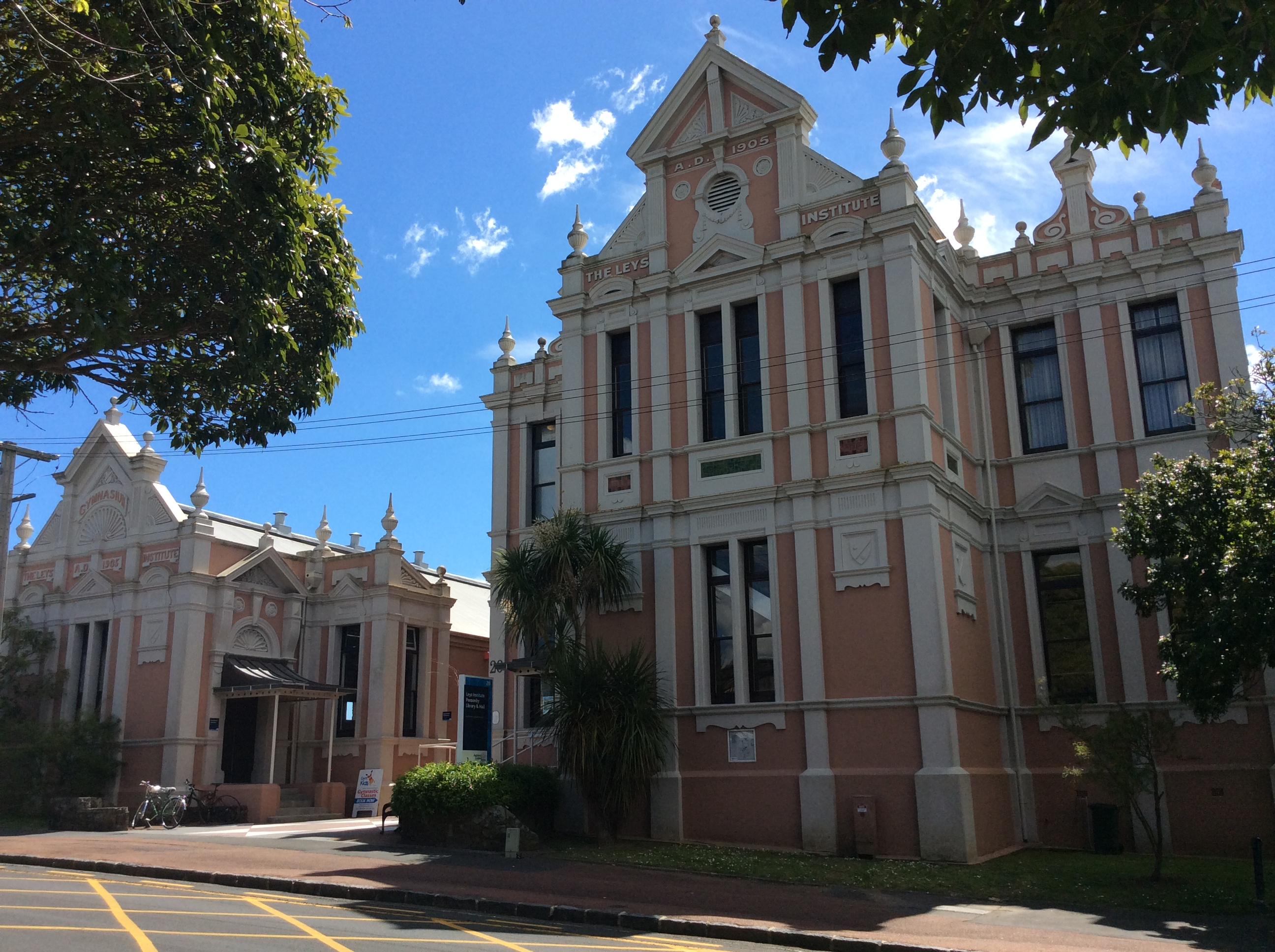
- The Leys Institute Gymnasium (left) and Leys Institute Public Library (right)

General information
- Status: Closed for seismic strengthening
- Type: Gymnasium and library
- Architectural style: Edwardian Baroque
- Location: Three Lamps, 14–20 St Marys Road, Ponsonby, Auckland
- Coordinates: 36°50′47″S 174°44′41″E
- Named for: William Leys
- Year built: 1905–1906
- Renovated: 1991, 2024

Design and construction
- Architect: Robert Martin Watt

Heritage New Zealand – Category 1
- Designated: 11 November 1981
- Reference no.: 612

Heritage New Zealand – Category 1
- Designated: 11 November 1981
- Reference no.: 613

The Leys Institute comprises two early-20th-century public buildings in Ponsonby, Auckland, New Zealand, the Leys Institute Gymnasium and the Leys Institute Public Library. Both have category 1 heritage listings. The Leys Institute was founded by the will of William Leys and designed in an Edwardian Baroque style by Robert Martin Watt.

== Description ==
The Leys Institute buildings are both Edwardian Baroque with the library being two storeys tall and the gymnasium being a single storey. The windows are very narrow and have pilasters separating them. Each pediment has a volute on both sides, which is similar in style to a Dutch gable.

The first floor of the library contains the library itself, whilst the second floor contains a room for recreation, a lecture hall, and a meeting room.

The gymnasium bears the Latin inscription mens sana in corpore sano (a sound mind in a sound body).

== History ==
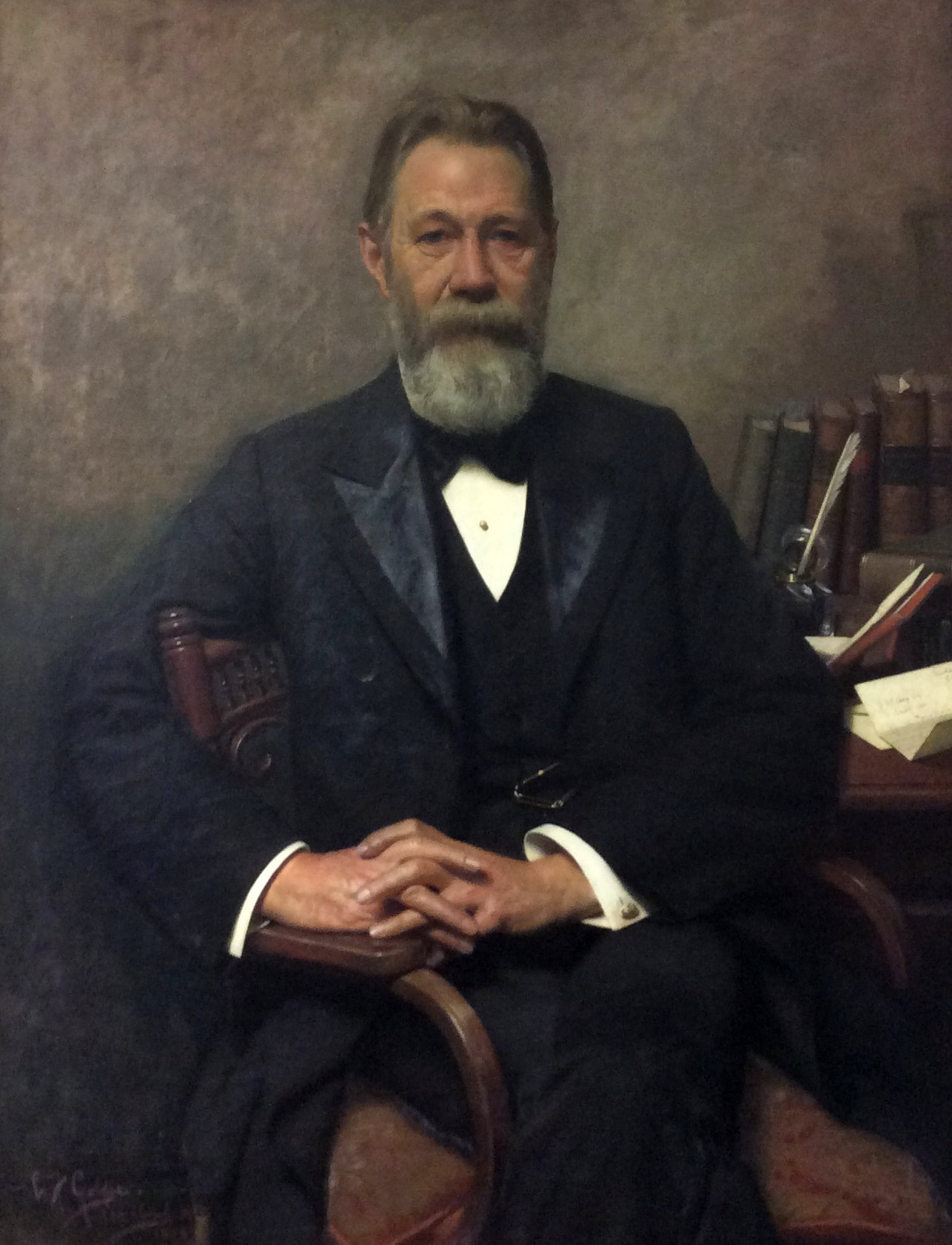
Thomson W. Leys

The Leys Institute was founded by the will of William Leys following his death in 1899. William wished to found a library and mechanics institute, but his will did not have enough funds for it. His brother Thomson Wilson Leys negotiated a deal with Auckland City Council that he would contribute half the funds and the council the land for the institute. The Council agreed to this. Additional funding came from the estate of William Mason, a local resident; and two mayors of Auckland.

Both buildings were designed by the architect Robert Martin Watt. On 29 March 1905, mayor Edwin Mitchelson opened the Leys Institute Public Library. The Leys Institute Gymnasium opened on 4 July 1906 by Thomson Leys.

The Leys Institute was run by the Leys family, with Thomson as the first president. Thomson donated his personal collection to the library and established a memorial fund for his wife, which resulted in the Hilary Lays Memorial Wing extension. Thomson was succeeded by his son, Cecil Leys. The institute was formally integrated into the Auckland Public Library system in 1965, as no beneficiary was available to inherit the institute.

The library building was expanded as both the local population and collection increased. In 1909 the library added a new room, and in 1922, a basement was added. A rear addition and basement extension were done in 1939, and in 1958, the Hilary Leys Memorial Wing, a two-storey children's library, was constructed.

The gymnasium had a two-storey extension built by Auckland City Council in 1967 and 1968, but this was later demolished during the 1991 renovation, when the main gymnasium area was extended.

In 1991, John Gummer led a restoration funded by the William Leys Trust.

Since 2019, the Leys Institute has been closed due to being earthquake-prone. Auckland Council has since committed $9.6 million to strengthen the building.

== Legacy and use ==
The Leys Institute has served as a library and gymnasium but also as a community centre with artistic and sporting groups utilising the facilities.

Heritage New Zealand described the Leys Institute as a "nationally significant ... monument to the Victorian ideals of education and self-improvement, and the philanthropic ideals of sections of the Victorian middle class" and said that it contributes to the streetscape of the Three Lamps area, along with the Ponsonby Post Office.
