= Marie Mariterangi =

- Also known as: Marie Mariteragi, Marie Terangi, Marie
- Born: Marie Mariterangi; May 3, 1926; Hikueru, French Polynesia, France
- Died: April 27, 1971 Papeete, French Polynesia, France
- Genres: Polynesian music
- Occupations: Singer, songwriter
- Instruments: Voice, guitar, ukulele
- Years active: 1954–1969
- Labels: Tahiti Records

Marie Mariterangi, Marie Mariteragi, Marie Terangi or Marie was a singer, guitarist, and ukulele player, and wrote Polynesian pop music. She was born on May 3, 1926 in Hikueru in French Polynesia and died on April 27, 1971 in Papeete in French Polynesia.

== Biography ==
Marie Mariterangi, also known as "Marie Mariteragi", "Marie Terangi" or simply "Marie", was born on May 3, 1926 in Hikueru in the Tuamotu islands in a family of Polynesian pop musicians who became famous between the 1950s and the 1990s. Her brother Teaitu (1928–2013), her sisters Célia and Mélia, her half-sister Emma (1938–2000), her mother Hiriata (1896–1986) and her cousin Turuma were all musicians, solo or choir singers in different orchestras of the time. Emma, the youngest of the siblings and the most famous with Marie, was known in the Polynesian music industry under the name "Emma Terangi".

Marie started her professional career in 1954 after meeting Eddie Lund. She took part in one of Eddie Lund's albums, "Rendezvous in Tahiti". Her first band was called Les Troubadours des Îles, with whom she made her first recordings. She sang at the Quinn's, a legendary night club of Papeete with a sometimes infamous reputation. From 1955, Marie sang in the luxury hotels of Tahiti, such as the Royal Tahitien, the Royal Papeete or Les Tropiques, a famous hotel, which Paul Gauguin and Marlon Brando in their days would have hung out at. She then set up the first professional dance troop that performed during cruise ship stopovers.

She moved from French Polynesia to Honolulu in Hawaii in August 1959, and eventually moved to the mainland United States. She and her bands performed under different names, such as The Marie Terangi Trio, Marie Terangi Et Son Groupe or Mariterangi.

She died from cancer in Papeete in 1971. She is interred at Uranie Cemetery in Papeete. In 2001, she features on a French Polynesian postage stamp.

== Musical influences and collaborations ==
=== Influences ===
- Polynesian music
- Hawaiian music

=== Collaborations ===
Marie Mariterangi wrote and composed a few songs but mostly sang traditional songs or pieces written and composed by others. For example, she sang many songs written by Eddie Lund.

== Discography ==
Marie Mariterangi performed more than a hundred songs as a solo, duo ou choir singer under different stage names that were mostly published on vinyl records in LP, EP and 45 format and in cassette format. In numerical format, her work is today only available in compilation albums. The list hereafter gathers the albums and the compilations comprising some tracks performed or co-performed by her.

=== Original albums ===
==== 78 rpm ====
- Moemoea – Manina E Ravarava (Tahiti 151) : the track "Moemoea" on the A-side is performed by Marie avec Les Troubadours des Îles and the track "Manina E Ravarava" on the B-side is performed by Les Troubadours des Îles et Hiriata

==== LP ====
- 1954 : Rendezvous in Tahiti (Decca DL-8189, Festival FL-7134, Tahiti EL-1002): on this album credited to Eddie Lund and His Tahitians, Marie Terangi takes part in the interpretation of the tracks "Ia Neke", "I Vaho", "Puaatoro Hellaby" and "Merite Maa"
- Call of the Coral Isles (Tahiti EL-1004): there is a version credited to Eddie Lund and His Tahitians and a version credited to Marie et Teaitu Terangi and their cousins, nephews and nieces
- 1965 : Aparima et Otea (Tahiti EL-1017): the album includes five ʻaparima, performed by Hiriata et Son Chœur et Maono et Le Groupe de Patutoa, in between four otea, performed by Salamon et Ses Batteurs
- 1965 : Ua Ruka – Mariterangi (Tahiti EL-1018): the album is performed by the band Mariterangi, whose present members are Marie, Hiriata, Teaitu and Turuma
- 1965 : Paumotu Party au Bel Air (Tahiti EL-1028): by Mariterangi et Les Bel Air Boys
- Vahine Ravarava (Tahiti EL-1030): by Marie Terangi et Les Bel Air Boys et Salomon et L'Otea Tiare Tahiti
- Tahiti – Mariterangi – Tiare Koe Kahaia – Ute Purutia – Honeymoon Aue – Ruau Ma (Tahiti): the album is performed by the band Mariterangi Orchestra and Entertainers, whose present members are Marie, Hiriata, Teaitu and Turuma

=== Ancient compilations ===
- 1957 : Your Musical Holiday in the South Seas (Decca DL-8608, Brunswick LAT-8233): it is one of the compilations of the series "Your Musical Holiday In…" produced by Decca and whose tracks are performed by Eddie Lund and His Tahitians featuring Teaitu on "Haka Moko", "Vahine Paumotu Taku" and "Tangata Huruhuru", Teiatu and Marie Terangi on "Aue Ra Tou Here", Hiriata and Toti on "Upupa Ume", Marie Terangi with Hiriata on "I Roto Cent Vingt Six" and Marie Terangi on "Toetoe", "Tupu Te Ruki" and "Maunga Pu"
- 1959 : Tahiti! (Viking V126-25): the record with four tracks includes "Bad Man – Tangata Kino Koe" performed by Marie Terangi with The Coral Islanders
- 1959 : Tahiti Dances (Viking V126-26): the record with four tracks includes "Papio – Carousel" performed by Turuma with The Coral Islanders and "Bully Beef – Puaatoro Hellaby" performed by Marie Terangi with The Coral Islanders
- 1959 : James Michener's Favorite Music Of Hawaii (RCA Victor LSP-2150): the compilation includes three tracks, "Te Manu Pukarua (The Birds Of Pukarua)", "Vahine Paumotu (Girl of the Paumotus)" and "Mauruuru A Vau", performed by The Marie Terangi Trio and one track, "Hawaiian War Chant (Ta-Hu-Wa-Hu-Wai)", performed by The Marie Terangi Trio and Orchestra and Chorus
- 1961 : Hawaii Calling (Crown CLP 5206, Crown CST 203): the album of ten tracks includes two songs performed by Marie Terangi, on the A side, "Tanga Ta Hura Hura", and, on the B side, "Tahiti Nui"
- 1962 : Hotel Bora-Bora – Native Music From The Hotel Bora-Bora with the Pagan Drums Of Tamatoa (Tahiti EP-110): the record includes two tracks on the B side, "Mon Vieux" and "Oriorio E", performed by Marie and François with The Bora Bora Singers
- 1965 : James Michener's Favorite Music of the South Sea Islands (RCA Victor LSP-2995, RCA Victor LPM-2995): the compilation includes two tracks, "Tumu Mikimiki (Ia Neke)" and "Tahiti Nui", performed by Marie and Teaitu Mariterangi with Eddie Lund and His Tahitians, one track, "Tangata Huruhuru", performed by Marie Mariterangi and one track, "Samoa Silasila", performed by Celia and Melia Mariterangi with Eddie Lund and His Tahitians
- 1965 : Swim! Surfin'! Twist! Tamoure! (Victor SH5454): the compilation includes the track "Te Manu Pukarua" performed by The Marie Terangi Trio
- Ragoût de pommes de terre – Tahiti Nui (Viking V139): the record of two tracks includes "Ragoût de pommes de terre" performed by Teaitu avec L'Orchestre Les Tropiques
- Te Otue Atea E – Toku Tokaringa (Tahiti 154): "Te Otue Atea E" on the A side is performed by Emma avec L'Orchestre Eddie Lund and "Toku Tokaringa" on the B side is performed by Mariterangi
- Bora Bora – Tahatai Pofa (Tiki 200): "Tahatai Pofa" on the B side is performed by Marie, Teaitu, Turuma

=== Modern compilations ===
- 1989 : Vahine – Chanteuses de Tahiti (Playa Sound/Manuiti PS 65038): the compilation includes the track "Rai Tahiti Roa" sung by Marie
- 1994 : Drums Of Bora Bora And Songs Of Tahiti (GNP Crescendo GNPD 2214): the compilation includes the track "Noa'tu Ateatea" sung by Marie Mariterangi
- 1994 : Écho des îles Tuamotu et de Bora Bora – Queen of the Tuamotu Kainga Music (Manuiti S65817): the compilation includes pieces sung by Marie Mariteragi from 1955 to 1969
- 2002 : Folklore Paumotu – Vol. 1 (TAVT 126): by Marie Mariterangi
- 2009 : Folklore Paumotu – Vol. 3 (TAVT 008, GB Prod/Passport Songs Music): by Marie Mariterangi
- 2010 : Folklore Paumotu – Vol. 4 (TAVT 011, GB Prod/Passport Songs Music): by Marie Mariterangi
- 2010 : Folklore Paumotu – Vol. 5 (TAVT 210, GB Prod/Passport Songs Music): by Marie Mariterangi
- 2017 : South Sea And Hawaiian Originals (ZYX ELB 20252-2) : the album includes "Tamure Paumotu (Fun in Paumutu)" sung by Teaitu Mariterangi and "Noa Tu Ateatea" sung by Marie Mariterangi Et Son Groupe
- Hommage à Eddie Lund – "35 ans de musique polynésienne" – Chants tahitiens par Loma, Gabilou, Léonie Paul, Emma Terangi, Marie Mariterangi, Le Chœur de Tahiti, Coco et Le Groupe Temaeva, Le Groupe Folklorique Fetia (Manuiti 3019)
- Polynesia – From Bora Bora To Tahiti (Playa Sound/Manuiti PS 66527) : the compilation includes the track "Bora Bora I Love You" sung by Marie and the track "Te Matete" co-sung by Marie, Teaitu, Mila, Loma, Bimbo, Hiriata et Le Bar Lea Band
- Souvenirs de Bora Bora (Manuiti 3053) : the compilation includes the tracks "Hotera Bora Bora" and "Bora Bora I Love You" sung by Marie Mariteragi
- Tahiti Matamua – Marie Mariteragi – Chants "kainga" îles Tuamotu (Manuiti 65817) : the compilation is a new edition of "Écho des îles Tuamotu et de Bora Bora" (Manuiti S65817) in a collection called "Tahiti Matamua"
- Tahiti, Belle Époque (Manuiti 65807) : the compilation includes the tracks "Te Manu Pukarua" sung by Marie et Teaitu, "Te Matete" sung by Marie et Bimbo and the tracks "Tangata Huruhuru" and "Pua'a Toro Hellaby" sung by Marie
