= Tahiti Nui (song) =

Tahiti Nui is a Tahitian song that has been recorded by a multitude of artists. It is possibly one of the most popular Pacific Island songs.

== Background ==
The song can be heard on radio and in parties from Guam, to Port Moresby, to Rarotonga. Toti's Tahitians covered the song and it was released on the Little Brown Gal album which was released on Viking VP 24. It has been described by Bengt Danielsson, author of From Raft to Raft: An Incredible Voyage from Tahiti to Chile and Back as a melancholy Tahitian song in praise of the island. Possibly the earliest recorded version of the song was by Eddie Lund and his orchestra featuring female lead singer Irma Emma Samila Spitz, professionally known then as Mila. The song credited to Mila avec L'Orchestre Eddie Lund was the B side on a 78 RPM single with the A side "Ragout pommes de terre" by Teaitu. It was released on Tahiti label cat # 139. It was released as a 45 RPM single on Viking in 1958, credited to Mila With Eddie Lund And His Tahitians.

A song of the same name was recorded by Sol K. Bright And His Holly-Waiians. This is a completely different composition.

== Releases ==
Singles
Artist	Title	Release info	Year	Notes
Teaitu, Mila avec L'Orchestre Eddie Lund	"Ragout pommes de terre" / "Tahiti Nui"	Tahiti 139		Side A = Teaitu, Side B = Mila avec L'Orchestre Eddie Lund

Albums (LP)
Artist	Album title	Release info	Year	Notes
Toti's Tahitians	Little Brown Gal	Viking VP 24		Also released on 49th State Hawaii Record Co. LP-3426
Manuia & Maeva	Otuitui • Tahiti	Reo Tahiti Records SRT-520	1966	

Albums (CD)
Artist	Album title	Release info	Year	Notes
Amy Hanaiali'i	Generation Hawaii	Hanaiali'i Records 8556	2006	
