= Gluepot Tavern =

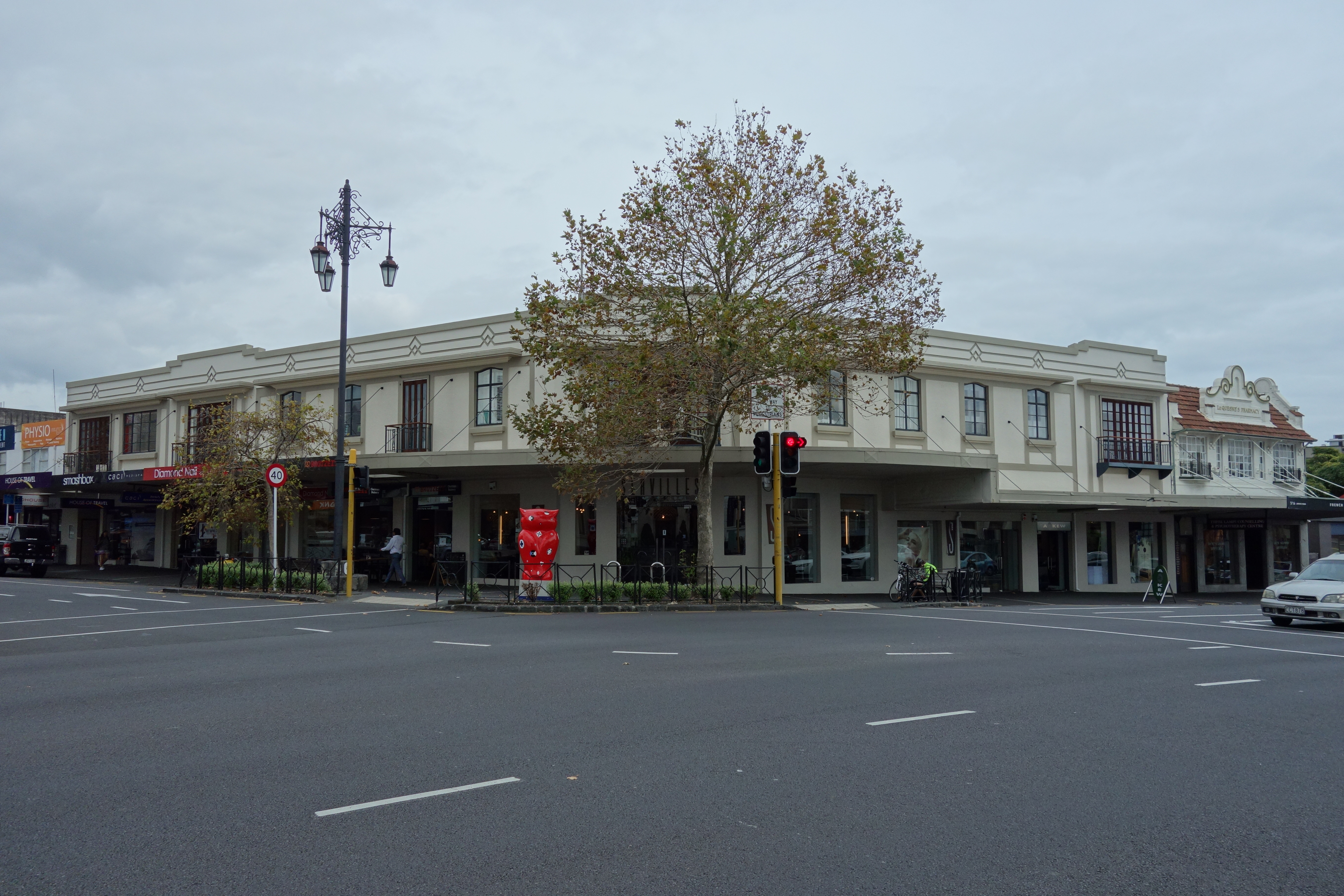
- Front of Gluepot Tavern

General information
- Location: 340 Ponsonby Road, Ponsonby, Auckland, New Zealand
- Coordinates: 36°50′51″S 174°44′38″E
- Opened: 1937

Design and construction
- Architect: Frederick Browne

Heritage New Zealand – Category 2
- Designated: 12 December 1994
- Reference no.: 7218

The Gluepot Tavern was a pub and live music venue in Auckland, New Zealand, first opened in 1937. It was located at 340 Ponsonby Road in Ponsonby on a prominent junction known as Three Lamps Corner, bordering Ponsonby and Herne Bay. The hotel and venue formed an important part of Auckland's cultural and musical scene, with the building gaining heritage status when the tavern closed in 1994.

== History ==
The Gluepot opened in 1937, taking the old site of an earlier hotel dating to the 1870s. This earlier hotel, nicknamed "The Gluepot" or "The Old Gluepot" possibly because men would go there for a drink and then get 'stuck' there all evening, was demolished in 1936. The new building was designed by Frederick Browne, officially known as the Ponsonby Club Hotel. The "Gluepot" nickname was later made official sometime during the late 1960s or early 1970s.

The surrounding suburbs at the time of its opening were predominantly working-class slums, with many industrial facilities in the area. The tavern was at a crossroads of Ponsonby, Herne Bay, Freemans Bay, and what was the route down to the original waterfront near Victoria Park and the rest of the city. Three Lamps was also the connecting point for the Ponsonby and Herne Bay tramlines, meaning the Gluepot became a pivotal part of the area's cultural scene. Regular clientele of the Gluepot over the years included New Zealand's first Labour Party Prime Minister, Michael Joseph Savage, who moved to 63 O'Neill St nearby in 1908 while working as a brewery worker.

=== Live music ===
In 1967, following the removal of the "six o'clock swill" liquor trading laws, the Gluepot began hosting live music and entertainment to draw in patrons. From then until the mid-1970s, the style of music at The Gluepot catered predominantly for a Māori and Pacific Island audience, as Pākehā owners had moved further out of the city into the suburbs, and Māori alongside recently arrived Pacific Islanders had moved into the area in the 1940s and 1950s. Blind Māori group The Radars had a residency at the tavern that lasted seven years, coming to an end in 1976. Notable entertainers to have appeared at The Gluepot during this time included Billy T. James and Prince Tui Teka.

From 1977, the style of the bands appearing at The Gluepot changed, with more Pākehā bands appearing and an emphasis on louder rock music. Hello Sailor was the first to play after their manager approached the Gluepot's booking agent, with their initial success prompting the venue to change tactics. A number of prominent and pivotal New Zealand bands appeared at The Gluepot, including Citizen Band, Th' Dudes, Mi-Sex, Toy Love, The Screaming Meemees, The Chills, The Verlaines, Straitjacket Fits, The Clean, Snapper, The Skeptics, The Bats and Shihad. The official capacity was around 600, though The Chills reputedly drew 1200 to one of their gigs. The venue also attracted overseas acts whose style suited small to medium-sized venues, among them John Cale, Hunters and Collectors, Nico, Paul Kelly, Warren Zevon, Lucinda Williams, John Prine, and Toots and The Maytals.

==== Live albums ====
Two tracks from Zevon's 1992 performance at the venue was later released as part of his Learning to Flinch live album.

A September 1980 recording of a Toy Love performance at the venue was released in 2012, titled Live At The Gluepot.

== Legacy ==
Owing to its importance in the history of the New Zealand live music scene and the cultural life of Auckland, the building gained a Category II listing from Heritage New Zealand in 1994.
