= Thomson Leys =

New Zealand journalist, editor, newspaper proprietor, philanthropist (1850–1924)

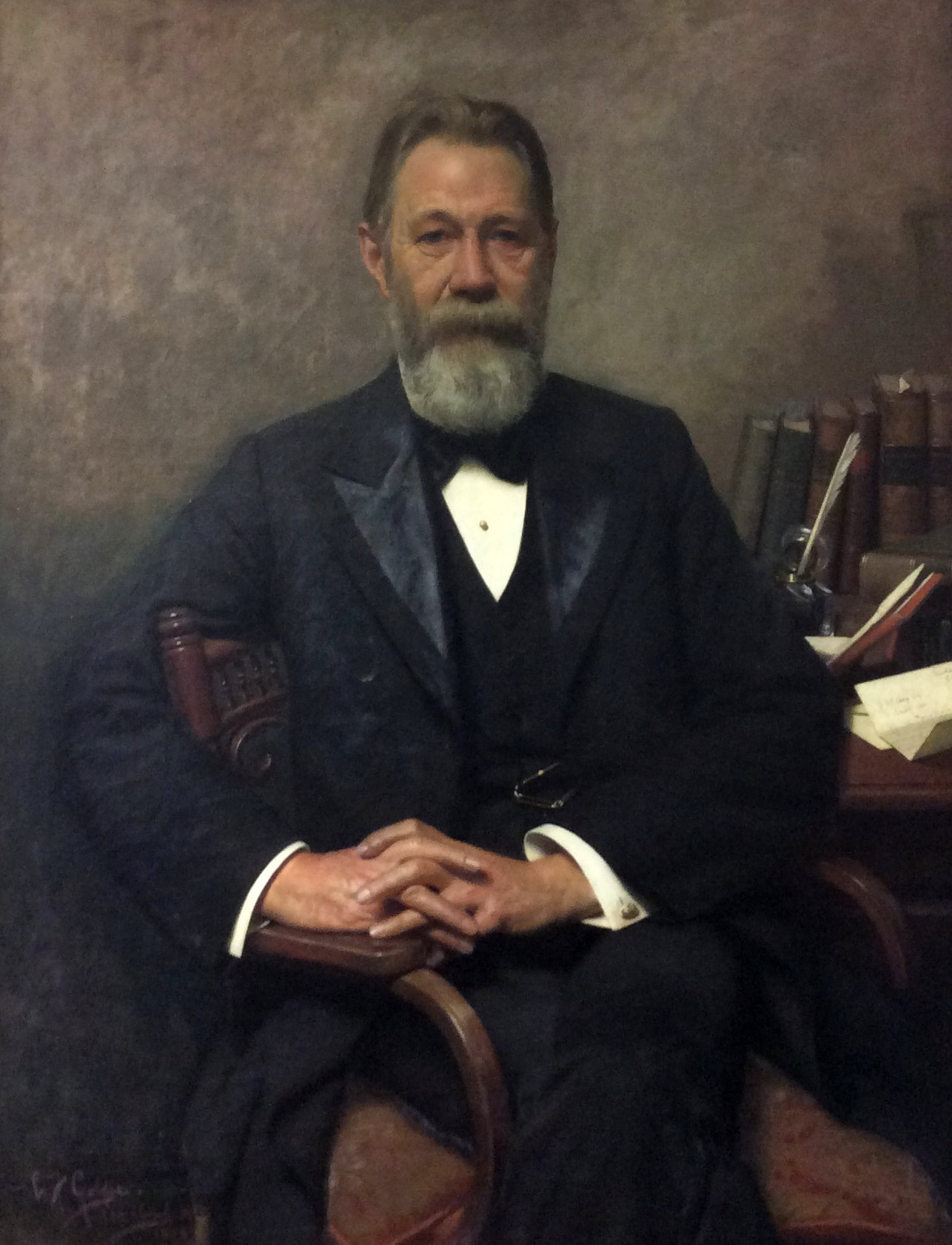
portrait of Leys by C. F. Goldie

Thomson Wilson Leys (23 April 1850 – 27 September 1924) was a New Zealand journalist, editor, newspaper proprietor and philanthropist. He was born in Sneinton, Nottinghamshire, England on 23 April 1850.

== Early life ==
Thomson Wilson Leys, the son of William Leys, a Scottish excise officer, and Hannah, née Wilson, was born in Nottingham, where his father was Supervisor of Inland Revenue. He was five years a pupil at the People's College, Nottingham, and emigrated to New Zealand in 1863 with his brother William Leys and his parents, who joined the great Nonconformist movement to establish a special settlement at Albertland, north of Auckland.

== Career ==
After arrival in New Zealand, Leys was apprenticed in the printing office of the Southern Cross, the oldest and most influential journal in the colony at that period. Three years later he obtained a transfer to the literary staff as shipping reporter, and in 1870, at the age of twenty, became sub-editor of the Daily Southern Cross and Weekly News, which were then owned by Julius Vogel, Colonial Treasurer. Compelled by ill-health to relinquish night work, he resigned and joined the editorial staff of the Auckland Star, assuming the chief editorship in February 1875, having also acquired a partnership interest in that paper, the New Zealand Farmer, New Zealand Graphic, and the large printing and publishing business connected with those journals.

In his leisure time, Leys did much literary work. He contributed the Auckland section of Sir Julius Vogel's "New Zealand Handbook", edited the "Early History of New Zealand," covering the period from the earliest times to 1845, and also the "Colonist's Guide," a standard textbook for settlers in New Zealand. He has also edited for sixteen years the annual issues of the Auckland Almanack, a compendium of statistical and descriptive matter relating to New Zealand.

Being one of the party formed at Rotorua on the day after the Tarawera eruption to visit Rotomahana and ascertain the condition of the Terraces, Leys wrote a graphic description of that great volcanic outburst, which was published in separate form. Among his minor literary works are a brochure on "The Doctrine of Evolution," in reply to Professor Denton, and notes of a holiday excursion to the South Sea Islands, "The Cruise of the Wairarapa". In 1891 Mr. Leys represented a syndicate of New Zealand journals at the Federation Convention in Sydney.

In 1906 he established the Leys Institute Library in Ponsonby, adding his own funds to a bequest made by his brother, William Leys.

His son, Sir William Cecil Leys, was born 1877. One of Thomson Leys' daughters is Winifred Leys, who married Selwyn Upton, and died in 1958.

Thomson Leys died on 27 September 1924 in Auckland and was buried at Purewa Cemetery.
