= Ponsonby, New Zealand =

Ponsonby
- Suburb
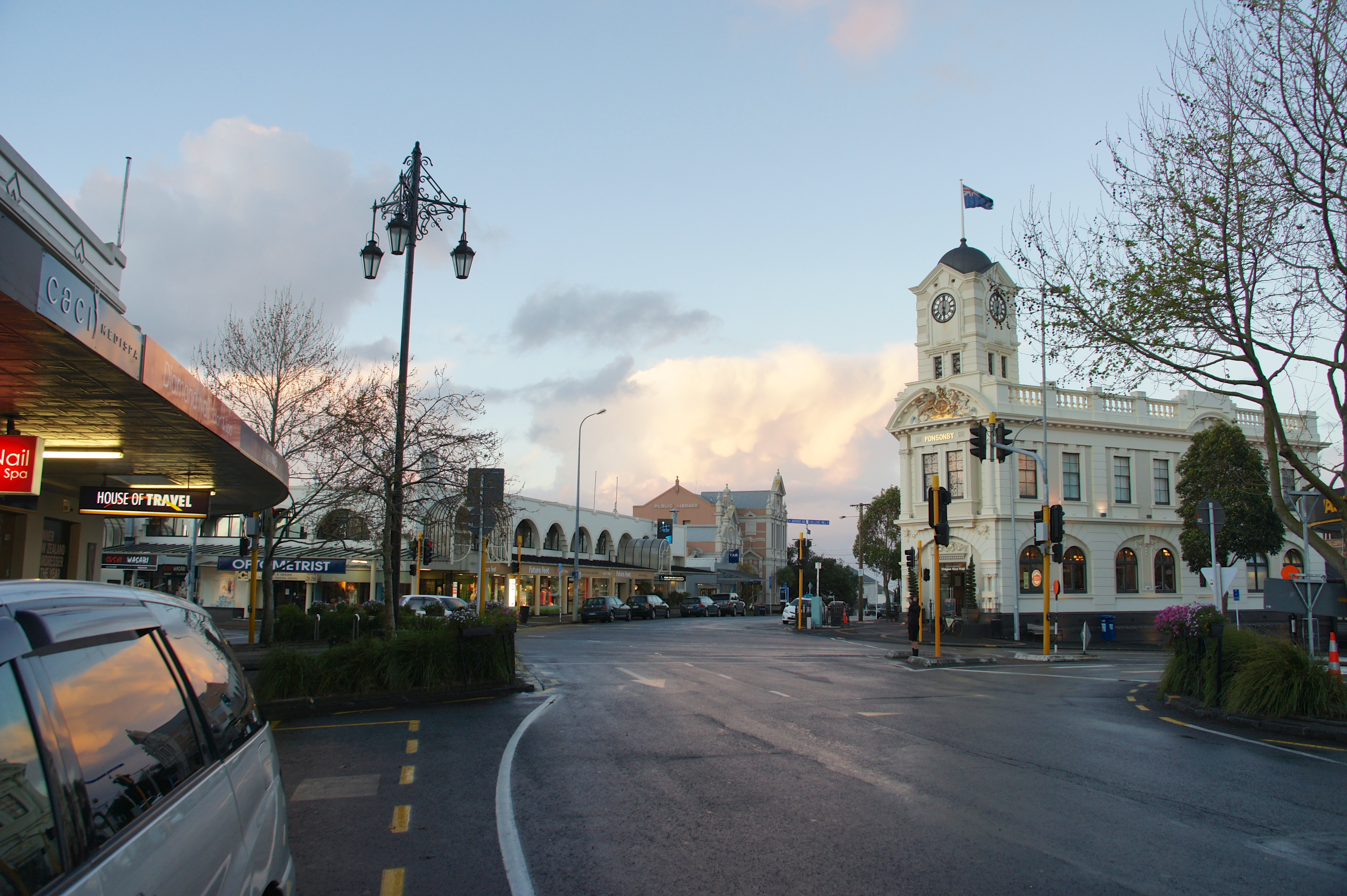
- The Three Lamps area in Ponsonby, with the Ponsonby Post Office and Leys Institute visible
- Interactive map of Ponsonby
- Coordinates: 36.852°S 174.739°E
- Country: New Zealand
- City: Auckland
- Local authority: Auckland Council
- Electoral ward: Waitematā and Gulf ward
- Local board: Waitematā Local Board
- Established: 1845 (approx.)

Area
  - Land: 135 ha (330 acres)

Population (June 2025)
  - Total: 5,450
  - Density: 4,040/km^{2} (10,500/sq mi)

Herne Bay	Saint Marys Bay	Viaduct Harbour
Westmere	Ponsonby	Freemans Bay
Grey Lynn	Arch Hill	Newton

Ponsonby (Māori: Te Rimu Tahi) is an inner-city suburb of Auckland located 2 km west of the Auckland CBD. The suburb is oriented along a ridge running north–south, which is followed by the main street of the suburb, Ponsonby Road.

Ponsonby was originally a working-class neighbourhood until going through a period gentrification that saw upper-middle class residents move to the area starting in the 1970s.

Three Lamps is an area of Ponsonby located at the intersection of Ponsonby Road, College Hill, and St Marys Road. This name is derived from a 19th-century Lamppost.

Ponsonby has many well preserved buildings from the 19th and early 20th century, including more than a dozen with Heritage New Zealand registrations.

== Etymology ==
The area now referred to as Three Lamps was originally called Dedwood in 1845, after a farm in Shelly Beach Road, which was apparently named after a Captain Dedwood. The name was changed to Ponsonby in 1873, apparently derived from Ponsonby Road. The name Ponsonby Road, which appears as early as 1860 on a map of Auckland, and reportedly was also recorded earlier in the 1850s. There are various people who might have inspired the name Ponsonby:

- Major-General Sir Henry Ponsonby, private secretary to Queen Victoria, 1870–1895
- The Honourable Ponsonby Peacocke, a member of the New Zealand Legislative Council who lived on Ponsonby Road in the 1860s
- Major-General Sir Frederick Ponsonby, a cavalry commander in the Napoleonic Wars and later Governor of Malta (and father of Henry Ponsonby)
- Major-General Sir William Ponsonby, a cavalry commander killed at Waterloo

The Māori name for the ridge is Te Rimu Tahi ('The Lone Rimu Tree'), referring to an ancient tree which, it is claimed, stood in a prominent position at what is now the intersection of Ponsonby Road and Karangahape Road.

== History ==
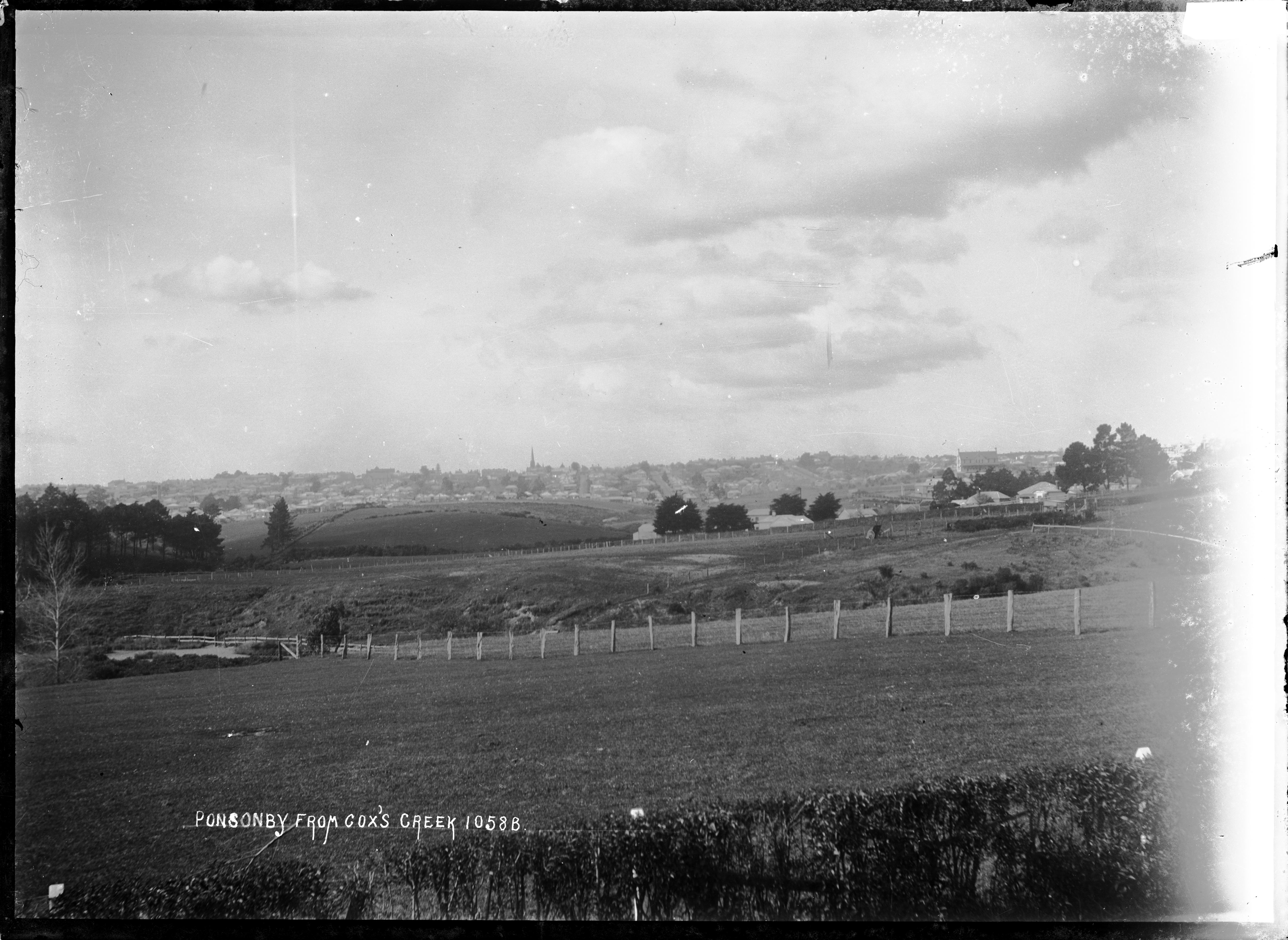
Ponsonby in the early 1900s as seen from Cox's Creek

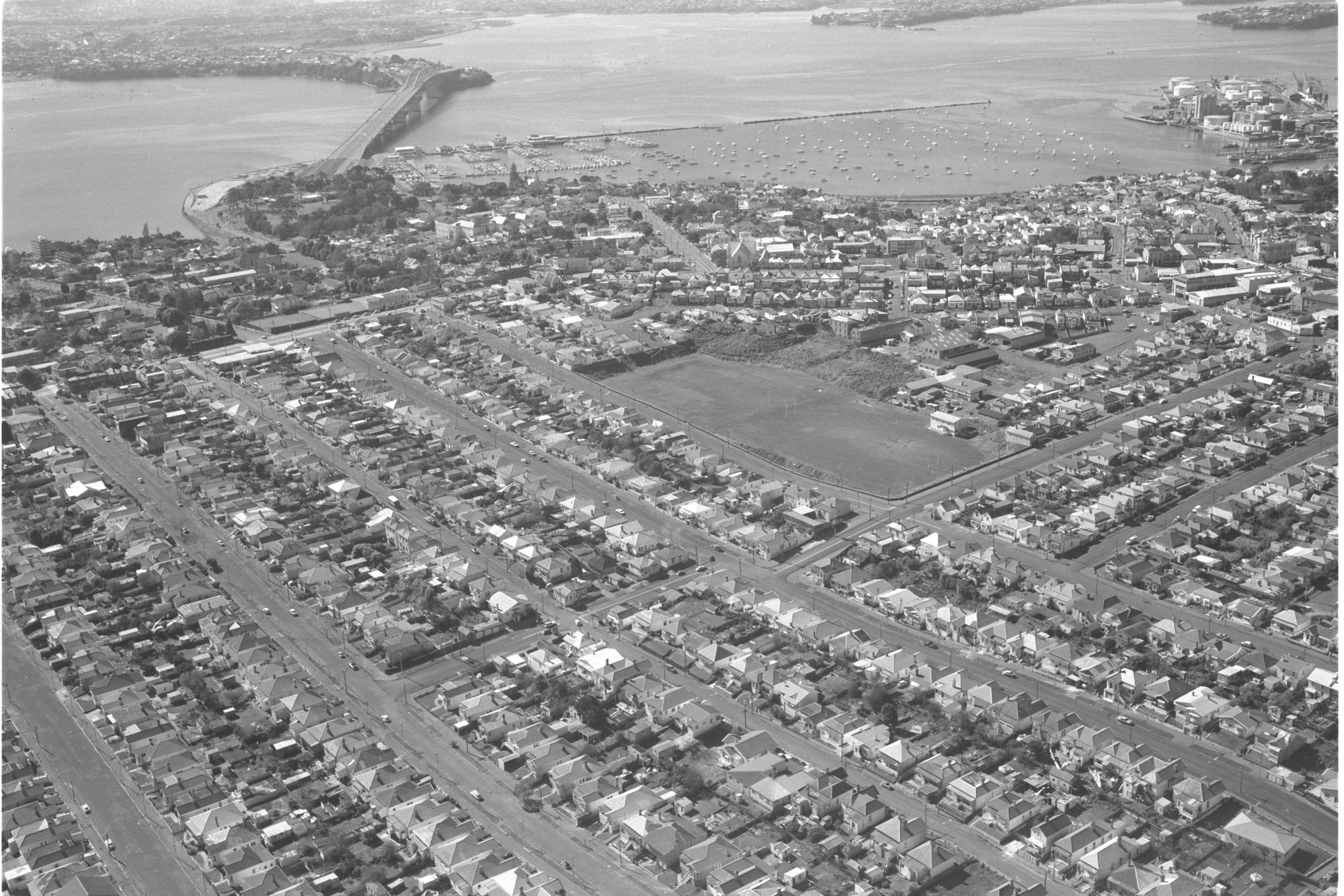
Aerial view of Ponsonby, 1970

The Auckland region was settled by Māori not long after their arrival, and by the 15th century, they had several fishing and gardening circuits in the area. In Ponsonby, there was a harvesting place for Kuta alongside the Waikuta Stream that flowed down College Hill.

In 1840 3,000 acres of land, which includes land that would become Ponsonby, was gifted from Apihai Te Kawau to Governor William Hobson to serve as the new capital of New Zealand. In 1845 land in Ponsonby was first subdivided. Ponsonby saw residential growth as Dedwood in the 1840s and 1850s with saw mills and shipyards supporting a small work force.

In 1853 Bishop Pompallier purchased 40 acres (160,000 m^{2}), what was later known as St Mary's Mount, which saw a large Catholic immigration to the area. Later in 1853, Bishop Pompallier moved St Mary's College for Catechists on the North Shore to St Mary's Bay, and St. Marys School for Boys & a Seminary were built on 5 acres (20,000 m^{2}) of Crown Grant land at the end of Waitemata St. In 1855, formerly the Bishop Pompallier House became St. Anne's School for Māori Girls run by the Sisters of Mercy. It was later known as the James O'Neill's house, and is now a category 1 listed building with Heritage New Zealand. In 1858, The Church of the Immaculate Conception was built and later demolished in 1869 – 70, and is now the site of the Pompallier Tennis Club. In 1859, New Street was put through the middle of the St Mary's Mount, and the eastern side of the street was presented to be the place for St Mary's College. The Nazareth Institute for Maori and Half-Caste Girls was founded in 1863.

In the 1860s, the land around the church, convent, and schools was purchased by many Catholics, and the street names such as Pompallier Terrace, Curran, and Dublin, Green Streets reflect the Irish and Catholic identity of the neighbourhood. There was significant debt accrued by Bishop Pompallier in the setting up of the missions around the country, which resulted in 1863, the selling of part of the 40 acres, retaining only 4 acres (16,000 m^{2}). In 1863, St Mary's College, the convent, and orphanage were moved to the New Street site and, in 1866, St Mary's Old Convent Chapel was constructed, designed by Edward Mahoney. On 23 March 1869, Bishop Pompallier resigns and returns to France, leaving behind a diocese that still had a considerable amount of debt. The Bishop was forced to sell the remaining land, including the Bishop's House. The site on New Street was then purchased back in 1873, and the current Bishop's House still stands on the site.

In the 1870s, Ponsonby's houses continued to grow in number as the population of Auckland increased. In 1873, the name of the area was officially changed from Dedwood to Ponsonby. In 1882, the Ponsonby Highway Board was amalgamated with Auckland City Council. In 1884, the first horse tram service from Queen Street to Ponsonby is started. The horse drawn service was later replaced in 1902 with electric trams. This led to more residential and commercial development in the Ponsonby area.

Around the dawn of the 20th century complaints were raised as to the quality and state of housing in the area. Ponsonby was considered an overcrowded area. With the advent of modern transportation residents began leaving Ponsonby for more desirable areas such as Mount Albert, Epsom, and Remuera.

In 1947, the first Pacific church in New Zealand, Newton Pacific Islanders Congregational Church was established on Edinburgh St, off Karangahape Rd. During the 1940s to the 1970s, there were many Pacific Islanders arriving in the country and many settled in Auckland, especially in the Ponsonby area. Ponsonby had a large Maori population during the 1950s and 1960s as the result of urban migration patterns. In the 1950s and 1960s, a combination of people moving to new outer suburbs, Auckland City Council policy of "slum" clearances and the construction of the motorway through Freemans Bay, led to significantly lower rents and an economic downturn in the area directly west of the CBD including Ponsonby.

In the 1970s, Ponsonby was home to various artists, as well as civil rights groups, unions, LGBTQ+, environmental and feminist groups. It was known as the birthplace of New Zealand Reggae and the Rastafarian Movement in New Zealand. In 1971, the Polynesian Panthers were first established in Ponsonby. From 1973 to 1979, Pacific families living in Ponsonby, and the rest of New Zealand, were subjected to the Dawn Raids – immigration raids targeting overstayers that overwhelmingly targeted Pacific Islanders. Increasing fuel prices and other factors led to more central locations becoming desirable and increasing rents increasingly pushed the Pacific community and students out of Ponsonby.

In 1979, the New Zealand Muslim Association starts construction work on the first mosque in New Zealand at 17 Vermont Street. In 1983, the Victoria Park Market opened in the old Victoria Park Market-City Destructor buildings.

In 1992, The Franklin Road Christmas lights display first ran. Over 100 houses on the street participate in decorating their homes with Christmas lights for free public viewing. It has since ran each year.

In 1996, The Hero Parade moved from Queen Street to Ponsonby Road. In 2013, the Auckland Pride Festival Parade then returned to Ponsonby.

== Governance ==
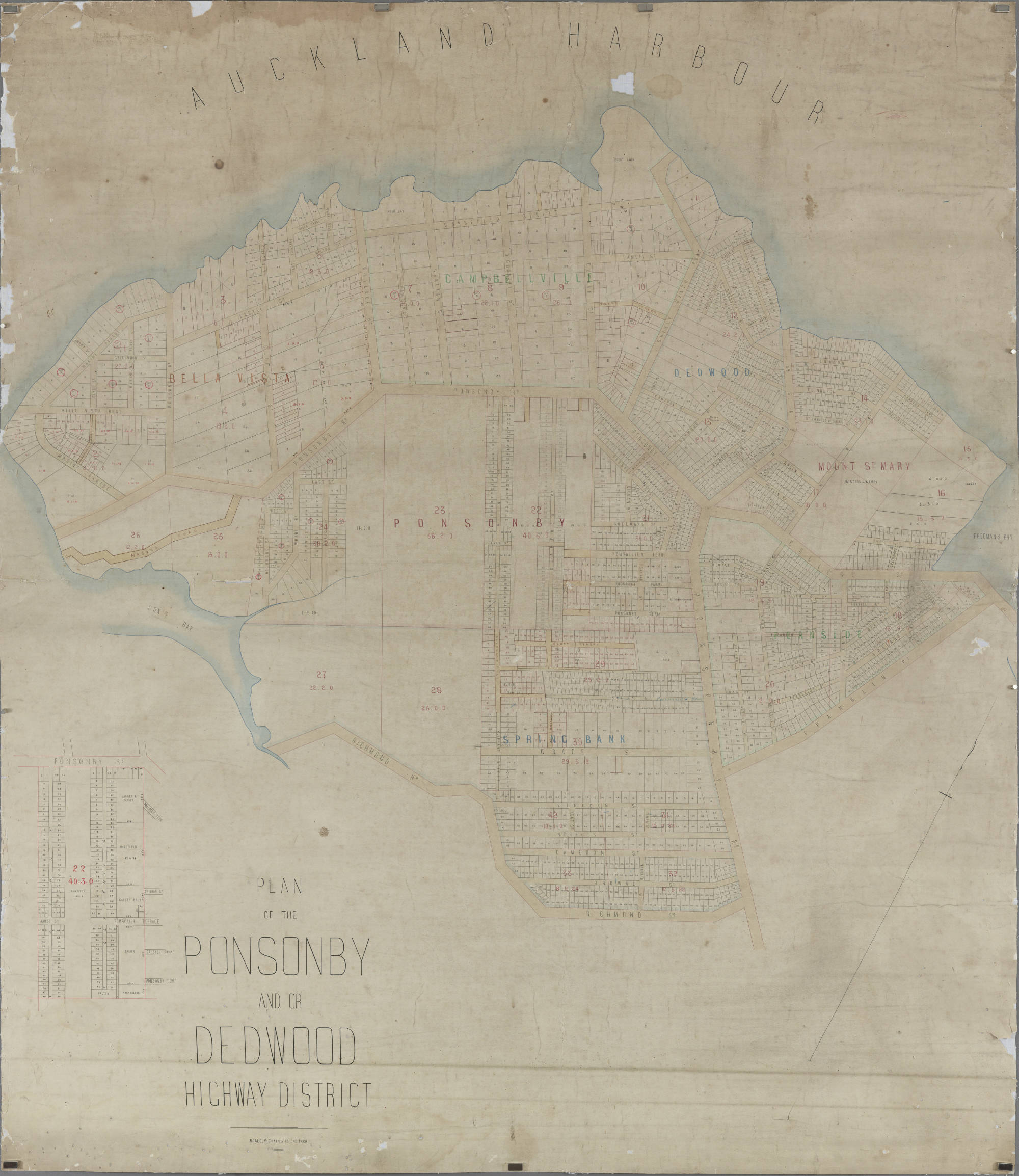
Map of Ponsonby/Dedwood Highway District c.1870 showing allotments and subdivisions names included are Bella Vista, Campbellville, Dedwood, Mount St Mary, Fernside, and Springbank

The Dedwood Road District was established 24 August 1868, it renamed to Ponsonby in 1873 and was amalgamated into the City of Auckland in 1882.

== Three Lamps ==
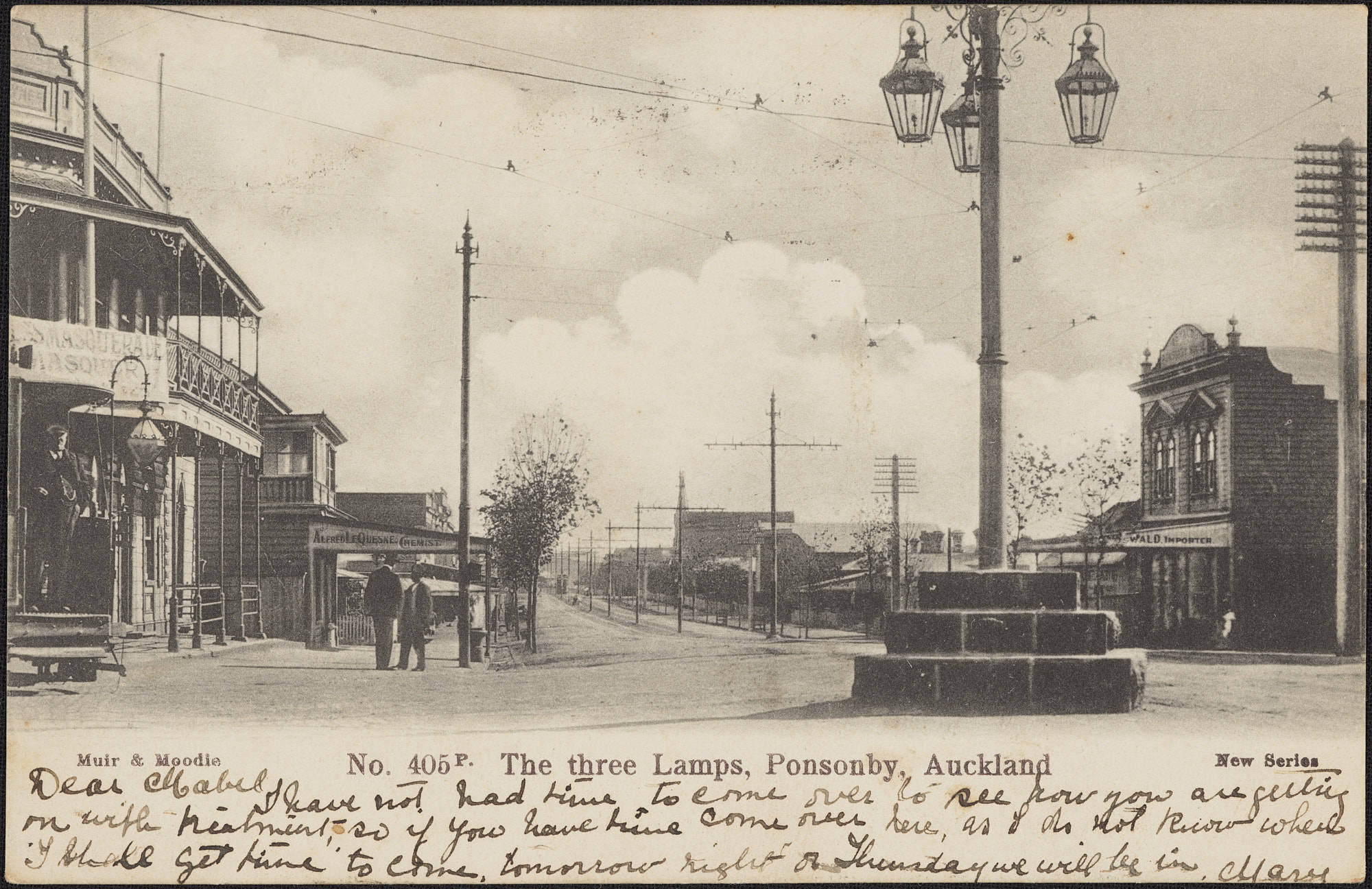
The Three Lamps in Ponsonby, whence the name Three Lamps derives

Three Lamps is an area of Ponsonby around the intersection of Ponsonby Road, St Marys Road, Jervois Road and College Hill. It is named after a lamp that was located at the centre of the intersection. The lamp was removed in the 1930s as a traffic hazard. It was later replaced with a replica on the footpath in 2012.

== Notable buildings and landmarks ==
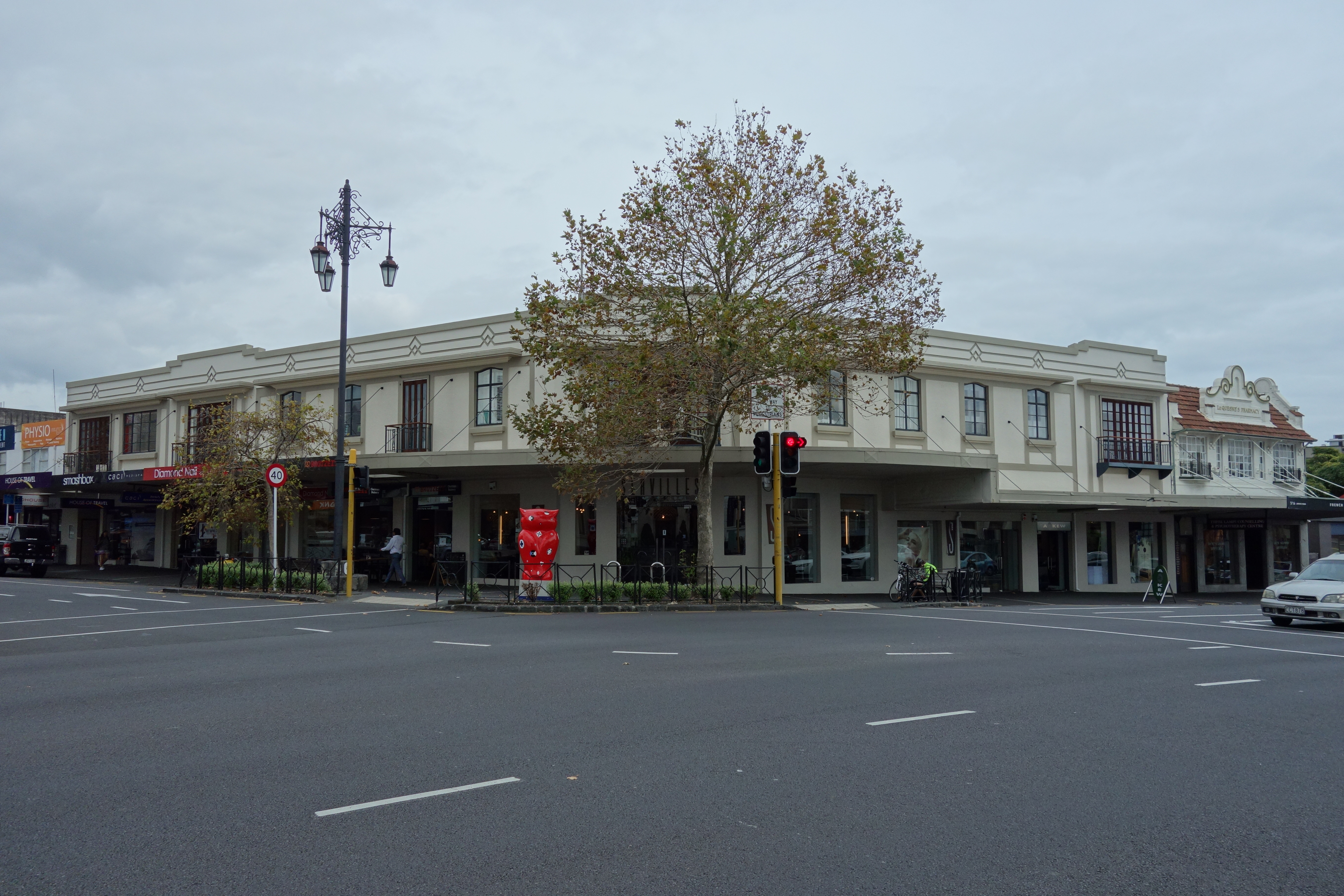
Gluepot Tavern with the replica Three Lamps visible

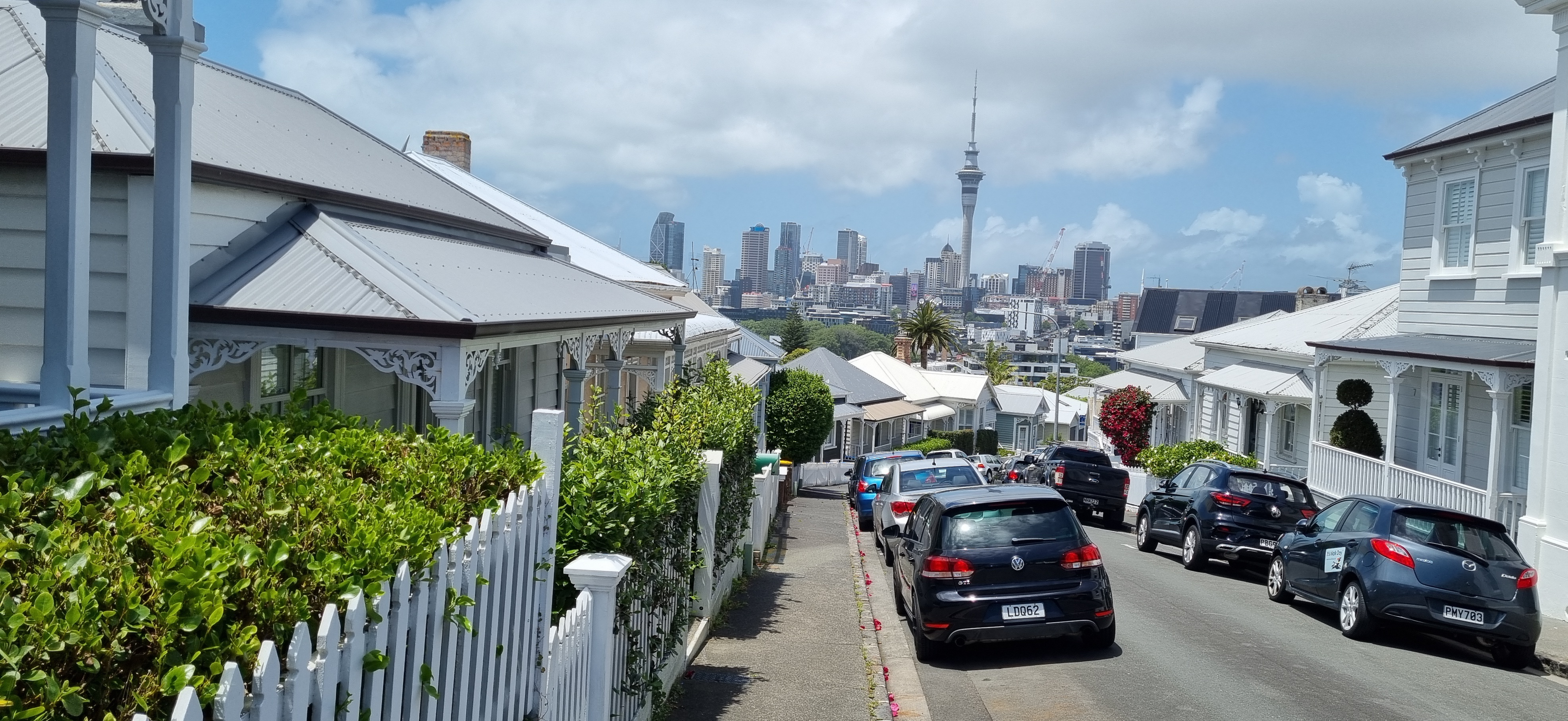
Renall Street is a protected historic area in Ponsonby

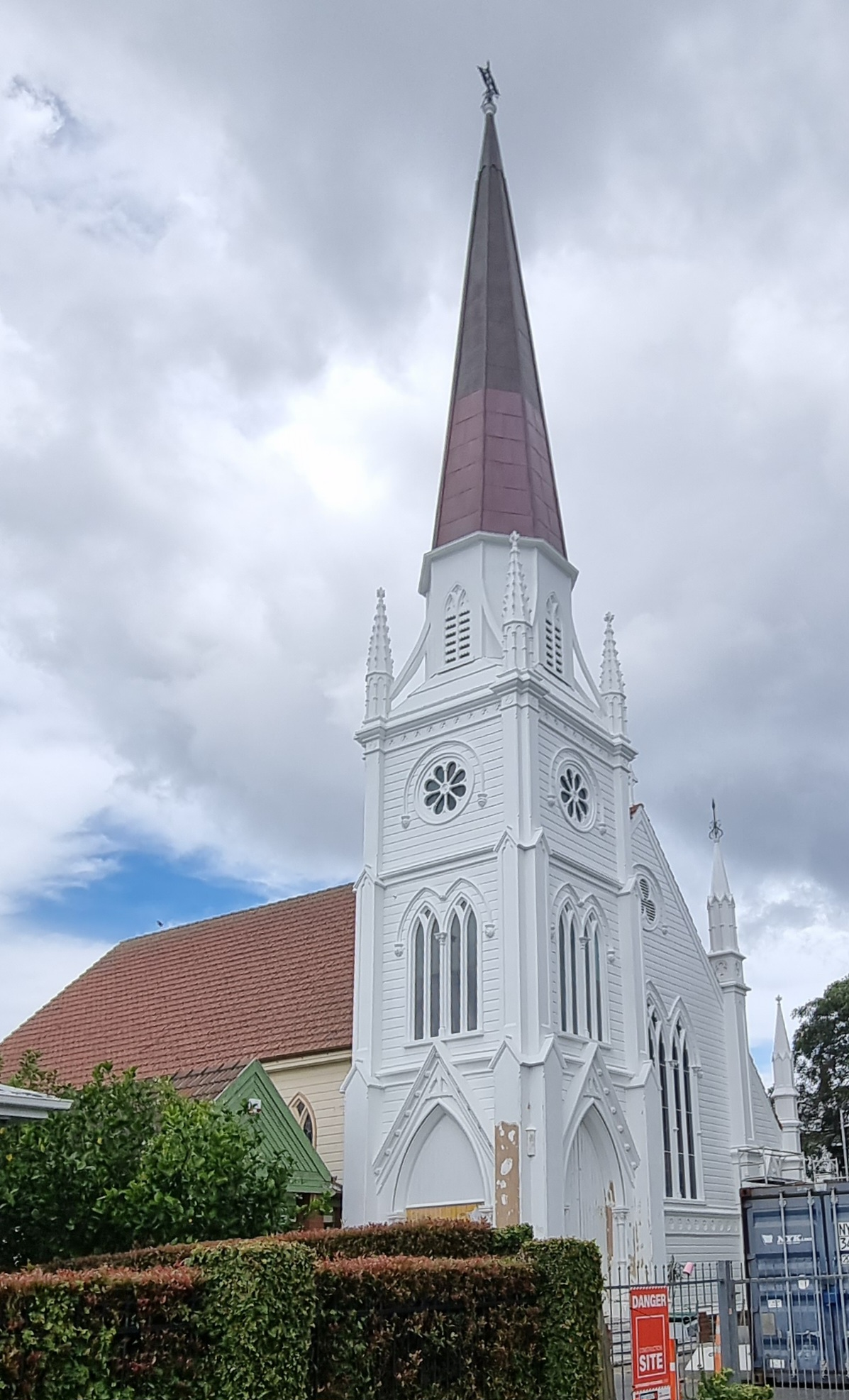
St John's Church

Ponsonby has many well preserved ecclesiastical structures, namely: the Ponsonby Baptist Church, St Stephen's Presbyterian Church, Auckland Unitarian Church, St John's Methodist Church, and the Catholic Bishop's House, St Mary's Old Convent Chapel, and the Bishop Pompallier House. All are registered with Heritage New Zealand.

The Ponsonby Fire Station was constructed in 1902 and is registered as a category B building with Auckland Council.

The Ponsonby Post Office was constructed in 1912 with an Edwardian Baroque design from John Campbell. It is registered as a category 1 building.

The Auckland Savings Bank building was constructed in 1928. It is registered as a category 2 building.

The Gluepot Tavern was constructed in the 1930s as a hotel. It has an art deco design. The hotel was originally known as Gluepot but the origin of this name is unknown. In the 1990s the hotel closed and the building was turned into a mix of apartments, shops, and offices. The façade has been kept.

The Leys Institute comprises two public buildings, the Leys Institute Gymnasium and the Leys Institute Public Library. The Leys Institute was founded from the will of a local resident and built in 1905–1906 in an Edwardian Baroque design by Robert Martin Watt. Both buildings have a category 1 heritage listing.

The Britannia Theatre was constructed in 1905 as a skating rink and by 1910 it was converted to become the Windsor Picture Theatre. By the 1920s it was named the Britannia Theatre. In 1969 the building closed. It was renovated to become the Three Lamps Plaza in 1981 and has served as a shopping arcade since.

Renall Street is a historic area and registered with Heritage New Zealand. All the houses on the street date to the Victorian era and have seen minimal changes. The properties on the street reflect the varied styles of construction for housing for lower-income families.

The Letholite Factory is a former factory that was used to produce Letholite Luggage. Constructed in 1919 for Palmer Collins & Whittaker the building continued to operate until the 1970s.

225 Ponsonby Road has an unnamed house that was used as a doctor's surgery from 1908 to 1920 by two Seventh-day Adventists.

203–209 Ponsonby Road contains a group of terraced houses that were built in the early 20th century. The houses have a category B heritage listing with Auckland Council.

The Vermont Street corner shops are a row of shops built in 1907 along Ponsonby Road at the intersection with Vermont Street. The buildings have a category B heritage listing with Auckland Council.

Holmdene is an Italianate home built in the 1880s for a local businessman. Holmdene later served as a boarding home in the 1980s.

The Braemar Building was built in 1911–1912 for a local lawyer. It was designed by William Alfred Holman. The building has since served as shops.

The Leys block is a corner building built in 1911 in the Queen Anne style by the Leys family.

The Auckland Unitarian Church is the first Unitarian church constructed in New Zealand. It was designed by Thomas White and built in 1901. It has a category 1 heritage listing.

The former Newton Police Station, designed by John Campbell. It was built in 1905 and has a category B heritage listing with Auckland Council.

== Demographics ==
Ponsonby covers 1.35 km^{2} (0.52 sq mi) and had an estimated population of 5,450 as of June 2025, with a population density of 4,037 people per km^{2}.

Historical population
Year	Pop.	±% p.a.
2006	5,487	—
2013	5,577	+0.23%
2018	5,730	+0.54%
2023	5,286	−1.60%

Ponsonby had a population of 5,286 in the 2023 New Zealand census, a decrease of 444 people (−7.7%) since the 2018 census, and a decrease of 291 people (−5.2%) since the 2013 census. There were 2,574 males, 2,682 females and 27 people of other genders in 2,079 dwellings. 7.6% of people identified as LGBTIQ+. The median age was 38.4 years (compared with 38.1 years nationally). There were 762 people (14.4%) aged under 15 years, 1,149 (21.7%) aged 15 to 29, 2,763 (52.3%) aged 30 to 64, and 612 (11.6%) aged 65 or older.

People could identify as more than one ethnicity. The results were 83.0% European (Pākehā); 9.8% Māori; 8.9% Pasifika; 9.4% Asian; 2.6% Middle Eastern, Latin American and African New Zealanders (MELAA); and 1.9% other, which includes people giving their ethnicity as "New Zealander". English was spoken by 97.7%, Māori language by 2.1%, Samoan by 1.2%, and other languages by 16.3%. No language could be spoken by 1.2% (e.g. too young to talk). New Zealand Sign Language was known by 0.3%. The percentage of people born overseas was 29.0, compared with 28.8% nationally.

Religious affiliations were 26.6% Christian, 0.8% Hindu, 0.6% Islam, 0.4% Māori religious beliefs, 1.1% Buddhist, 0.5% New Age, 0.6% Jewish, and 1.2% other religions. People who answered that they had no religion were 63.6%, and 5.0% of people did not answer the census question.

Of those at least 15 years old, 2,415 (53.4%) people had a bachelor's or higher degree, 1,536 (34.0%) had a post-high school certificate or diploma, and 570 (12.6%) people exclusively held high school qualifications. The median income was $67,200, compared with $41,500 nationally. 1,461 people (32.3%) earned over $100,000 compared to 12.1% nationally. The employment status of those at least 15 was that 2,754 (60.9%) people were employed full-time, 657 (14.5%) were part-time, and 123 (2.7%) were unemployed.

Ponsonby is popularly imagined as having a large gay population relative to other Auckland suburbs. A survey by the NZ AIDS Foundation found that the stereotype seems to be true, and that the area and the directly adjacent suburbs have a (in comparison) very high percentage of gay people, possibly attracted by the fact that they feel more at ease in an environment where gay people are relatively commonplace.

Individual statistical areas
Name	Area (km^{2})	Population	Density (per km^{2})	Dwellings	Median age	Median income
Ponsonby West	0.65	2,154	3,314	795	38.8 years	$64,400
Ponsonby East	0.70	3,132	4,474	1,284	38.0 years	$69,300
New Zealand					38.1 years	$41,500

== Education ==
St Paul's College is a state-integrated Catholic boys' secondary school (years 7–13) with a roll of 395 students. Marist School is a Catholic coeducational contributing primary school (years 1–6) with a roll of 117 which shares the same site.

Ponsonby Intermediate is a coeducational intermediate school (years 7–8) with a roll of 591. Richmond Road School is a coeducational contributing primary school (years 1–6) with a roll of 285.

Rolls are as of July 2026.

== Notable residents ==
- Ella Yelich-O'Connor/Lorde singer and songwriter.
- Peter Burling sailor.
- Karen Walker designer.
- Andrew Entrican Deputy Mayor of Auckland in the 1890s.
- Captain William Daldy MP. Member of the Auckland Harbour Board – lived Hepburn Street.
- Amey Daldy feminist wife of William and significant member of the Suffrage Movement which secured the vote for women in 1893.
- Freda Stark – Performer and dancer – regarded as the most notorious woman in Auckland. Danced naked, apart from gold paint, on the stage of the Civic Theatre.
- Florence Keller The American Florence Keller (née Armstrong) was a Seventh-day Adventist, who, when she died in her mid 90s was the oldest practicing surgeon in the world. She lived here from 1908 to 1920.
- Alexander McGregor – local business man – part owner of the Northern Steamship Line and latterly the McGregor Steam Ship Company.
- Michael Joseph Savage Labour Prime Minister and MP for Ponsonby.
- Peter Fraser Prime Minister.
- Helen Clark Labour Prime Minister – flatted here for a while with Judith Tizard.
- Judith Tizard MP for Central Auckland.
- John Currie Architect – lived at 50 Wood Street.
- Charles Blomfield (artist) Landscape painter – lived at 40 Wood Street.
- Betty Wark Social worker and activist – lived in Hopetoun Street.

== Sport ==
Ponsonby is home to the Ponsonby Ponies rugby league club and Ponsonby Rugby Football Club.
