= Bishop's House, Auckland =

Category 1 historic place in Auckland

Bishop's House
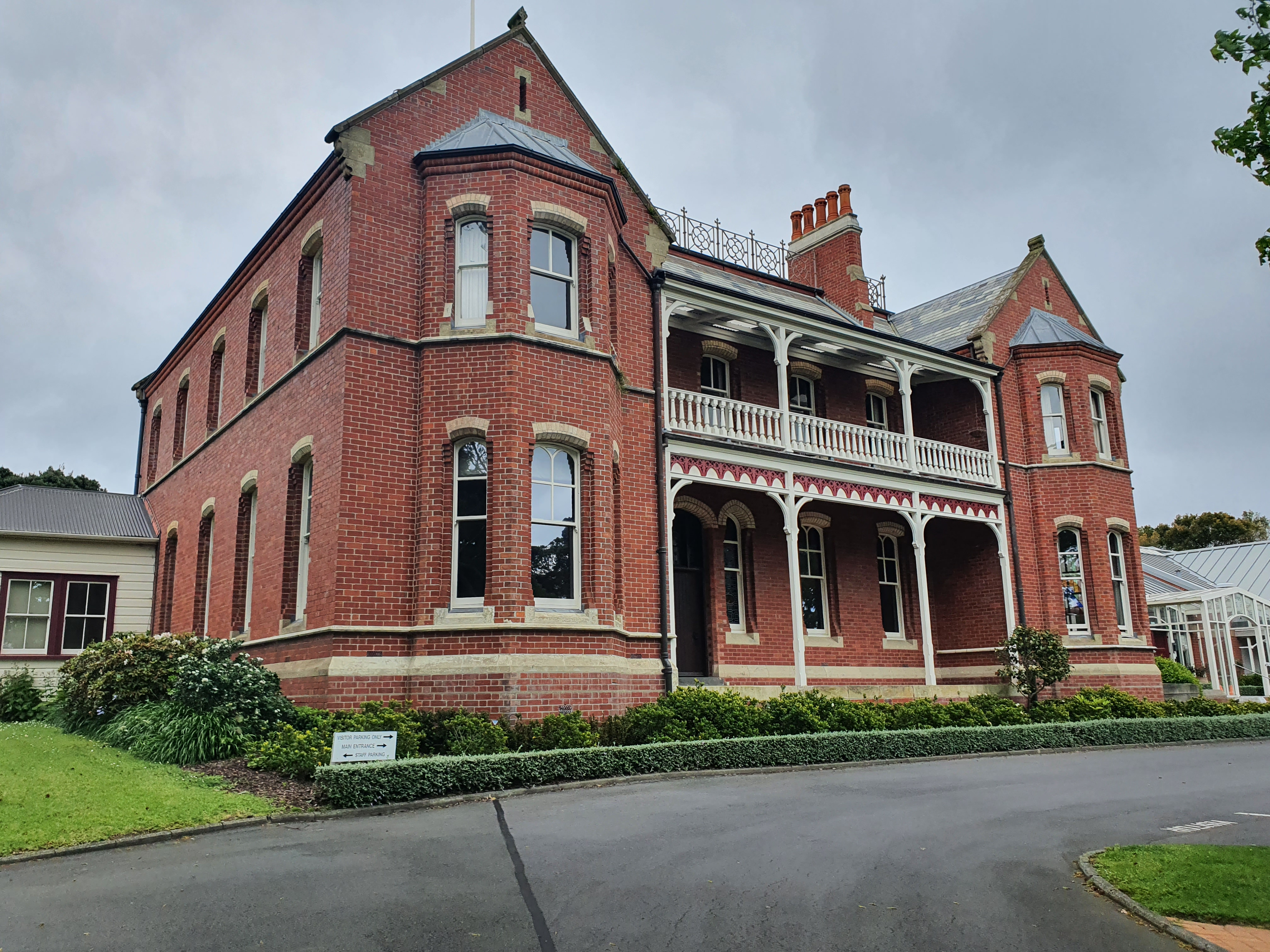
- Bishop's House
- Interactive map of the Bishop's House area
- Alternative names: Pompallier Diocesan Centre

General information
- Architectural style: Late Gothic
- Location: 30 New Street, 10 St Francis De Sales Street and Green Street, Ponsonby, Auckland
- Coordinates: 36°50′41.14″S 174°44′51.73″E
- Year built: 1893-1894
- Completed: 1894
- Cost: £4,000-5,000

Design and construction
- Architect: Peter Paul Pugin

Heritage New Zealand – Category 1
- Designated: 2 February 2013
- Reference no.: 555

The Bishop's House or Bishop's Palace is the residence of the Catholic Bishop of Auckland, built 1893–1894. It is part of the Pompallier Diocesan Centre.

== History ==
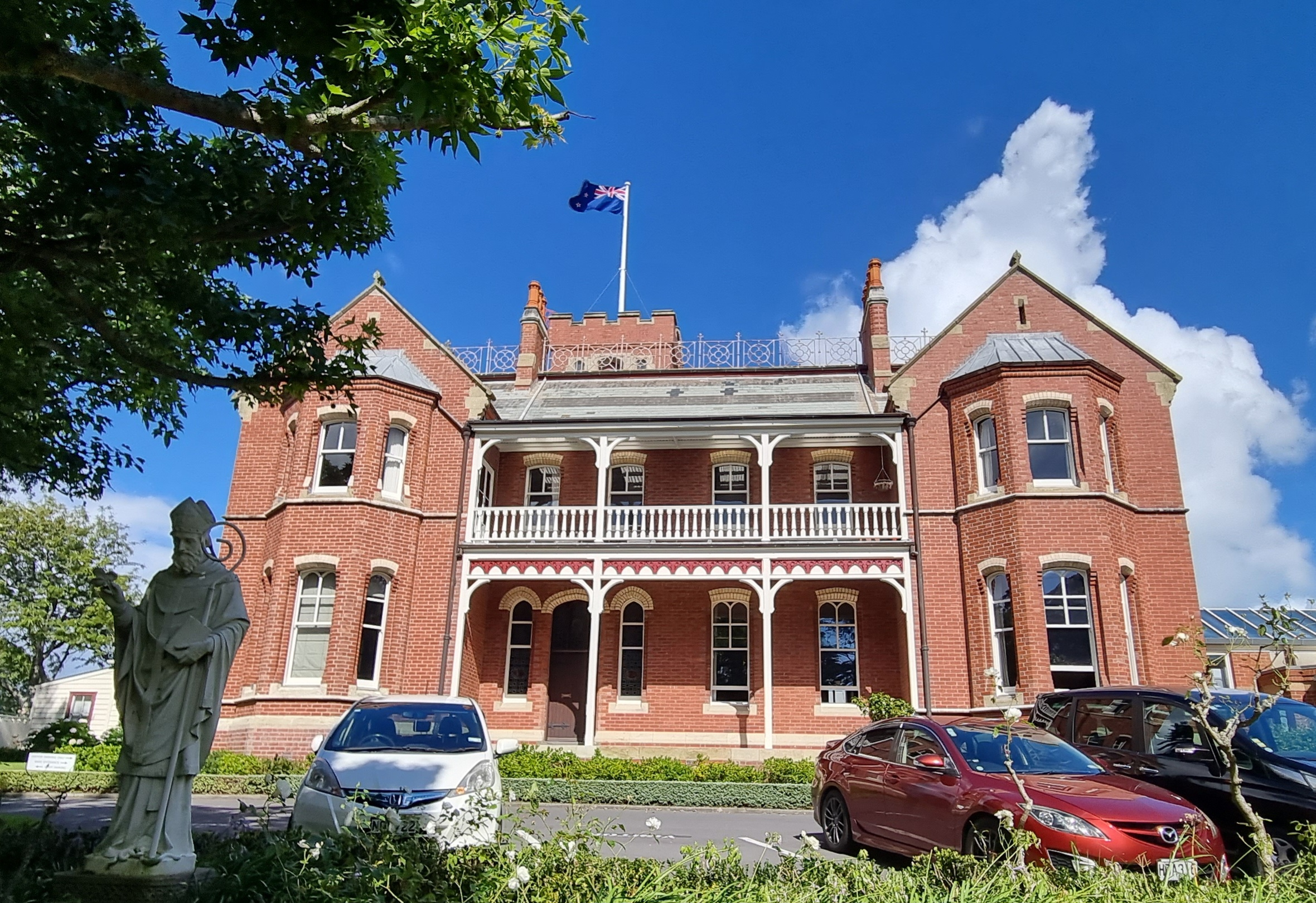
The Bishop's House

The land on which the Bishop's House, also known as the Pompallier Diocesan Centre or the Bishop's Palace, was bought by Bishop Jean-Baptiste Pompallier in 1853. Following his departure in 1868, it was briefly owned privately before being bought by Bishop Thomas Croke in 1873 to be used as the official residence for the Bishop of Auckland.

In 1891–1892, Bishop John Edmund Luck, went on a European tour to raise funds for building a new residence, raising between £4,000 and £5,000. There was an original timber structure on the site, which was largely replaced by the Gothic Revival two-storey brick building, apart from some timber elements that were incorporated into the rear.

Since its completion in 1894, it has housed all of the bishops of Auckland.

In 2013, it was official registered as a Category 1 Historic Place by Heritage New Zealand.

== Description ==
The Bishop's House sits in the centre of the site. It is attached to the newer Pompallier Diocesan Centre by two glazed walkways that was built in 1989. The British architect, Peter Paul Pugin, was influenced by his father's work at The Grange, Ramsgate and it is described as the finest example of Pugin architecture in New Zealand.

The house itself is a two-storey Gothic Revival dark-red-brick building with an H-shaped ground plan. The ground floor contains a square lobby with imitation stained glass windows by Alexander Booker. Several of rooms have geometric encaustic tile floors that Bishop Luck imported from France.

Gas was laid throughout the building and it was thought to be the first building in Auckland to be lit entirely by electricity. One of the bathrooms still has a functioning freestanding Unitas toilets, designed in 1883 or 1884 by Thomas William Twyford which was installed during the original construction.

At the north end, there is a chapel. It still holds a marble altar bought by Bishop Luck in Italy and imitation stained glass windows. The floors of the reception and chapel have parquetry borders made from New Zealand timbers by Father Augustine Luck.
