= Ponsonby Post Office =

New Zealand Category 1 Historic Place

Ponsonby Post Poffice
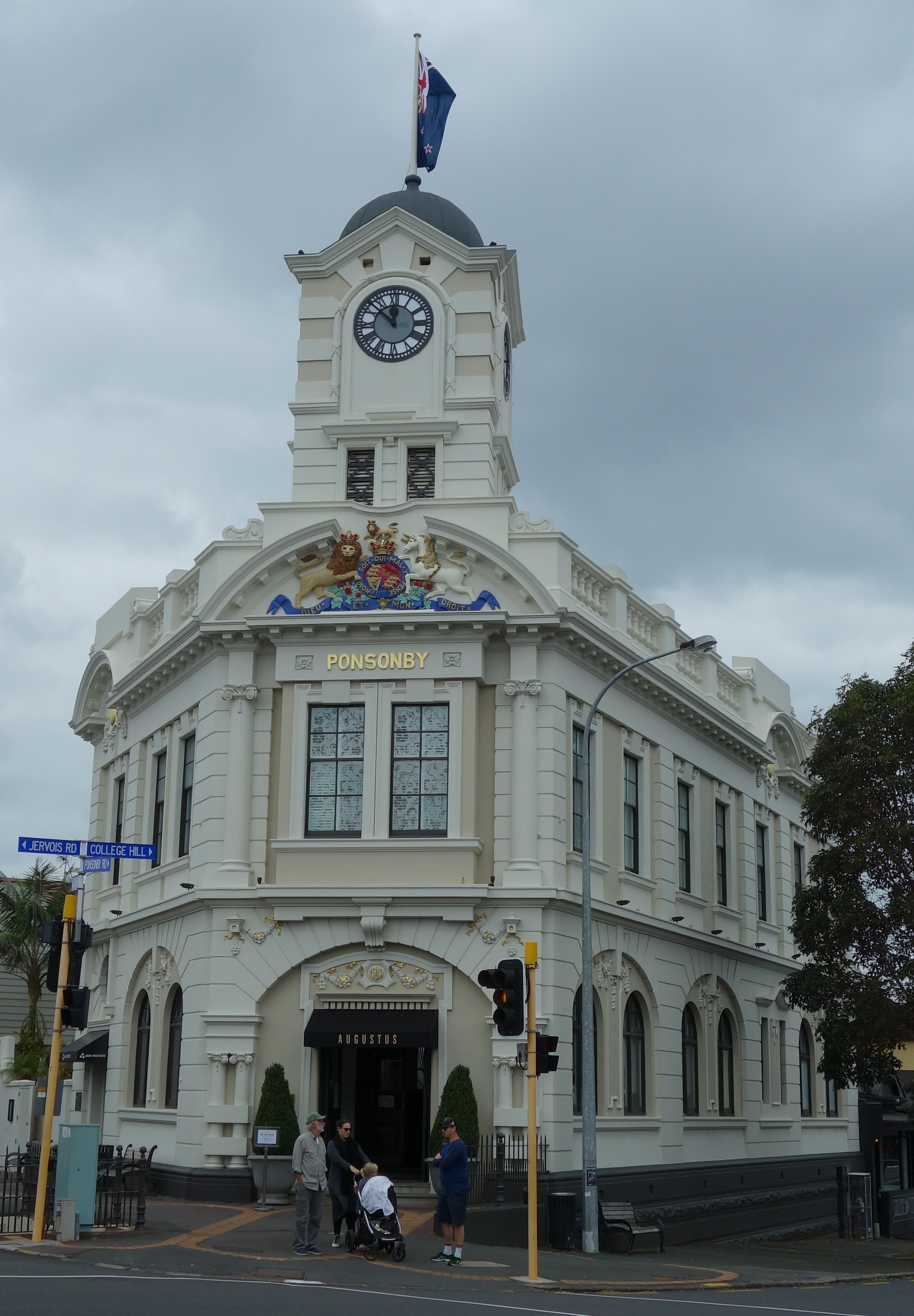
- Ponsonby Post Office

General information
- Type: Post office
- Architectural style: Edwardian Baroque
- Location: Three Lamps, Ponsonby, 1-3 St Marys Road and College Hill, Ponsonby, Auckland
- Coordinates: 36.84723936313432°S 174.7445847003885°E
- Year built: 1912
- Cost: £3700

Technical details
- Material: Brick, cement, rimu (interior)
- Floor count: 2
- Floor area: 537m²

Design and construction
- Architect: John Campbell

Heritage New Zealand – Category 1
- Designated: 7 July 1987
- Reference no.: 628

The Ponsonby Post Office is a historic post office in Ponsonby, Auckland, New Zealand, listed as a category 1 building. Designed in 1912 by John Campbell with an Edwardian Baroque style. The post office remained in use until 2002 when the building came to be used for hospitality and other commercial businesses.

== History ==
The Auckland City Council purchased the land in 1900 for £1,200. The purchase included a property which was used as the original post office. The current building was designed by John Campbell, who had held the position of government architect since 1909. Campbell preferred the Edwardian Baroque style for civic buildings and the Ponsonby Post Office was aldo designed in an Edwardian Baroque style. The post office was constructed in 1912 at a cost of £3,700. The original design had a clock tower but the finished building did not contain one. Local residents formed a committee and funded half of the construction costs of a clock tower. The clock tower was installed in 1913.

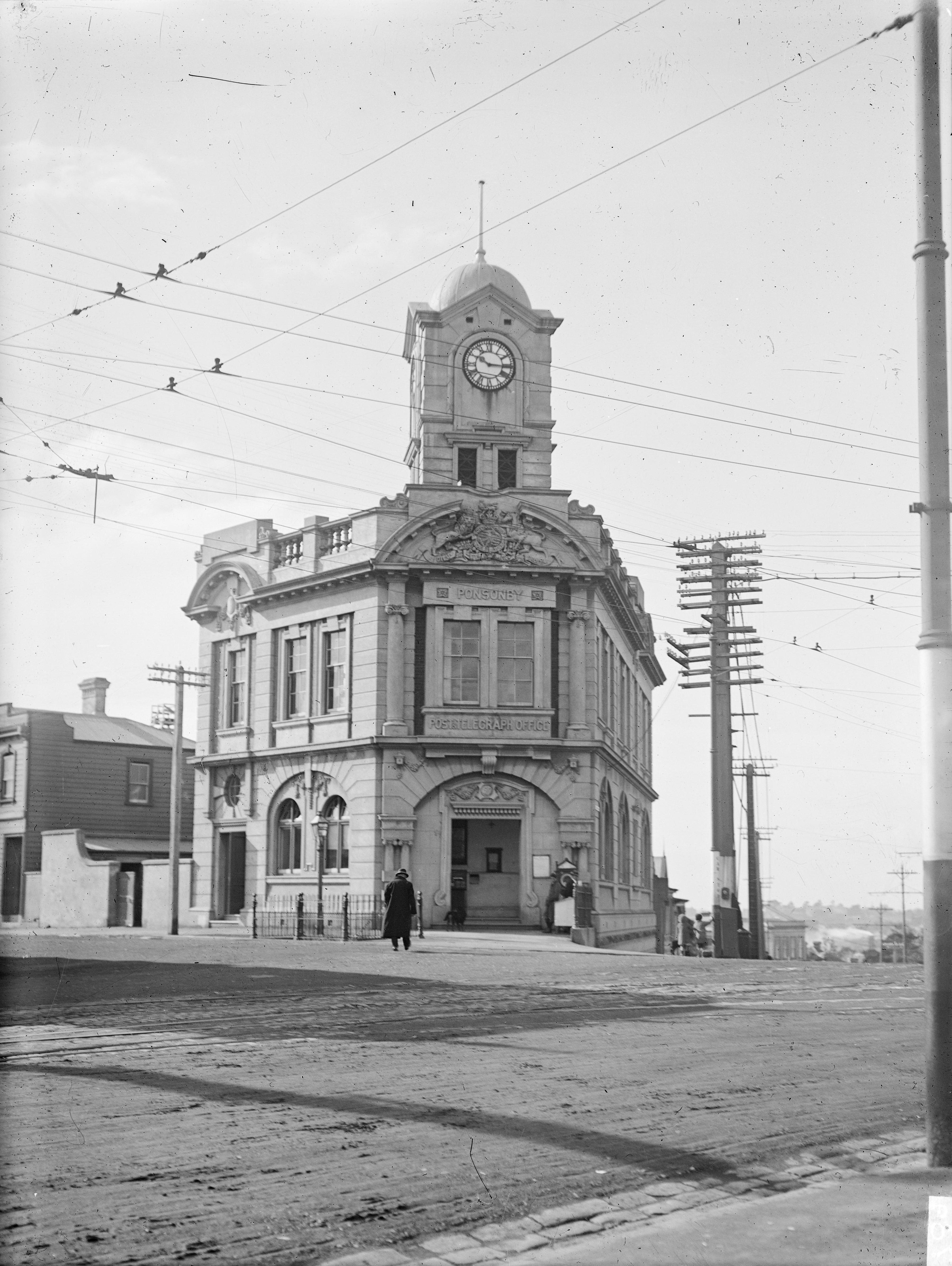
Ponsonby Post and Telegraph Office c.1920

It was considered as an earthquake risk in the 1940s but was not demolished. In the 1970s, there were concerns again, and $11,000 worth of renovations were undertaken. Auckland City Council sold the post office in 1992 to Portmain Properties. Auckland City Council continued to lease the property until 2002 as a post office.

Auckland Council are responsible for rewinding the clock, a weekly requirement. The building was strengthened in 2012 and meets all of the seismic strengthening standards for buildings.

Since 2020, a hospitality venue has been based in the ground floor of the building.

== Description ==
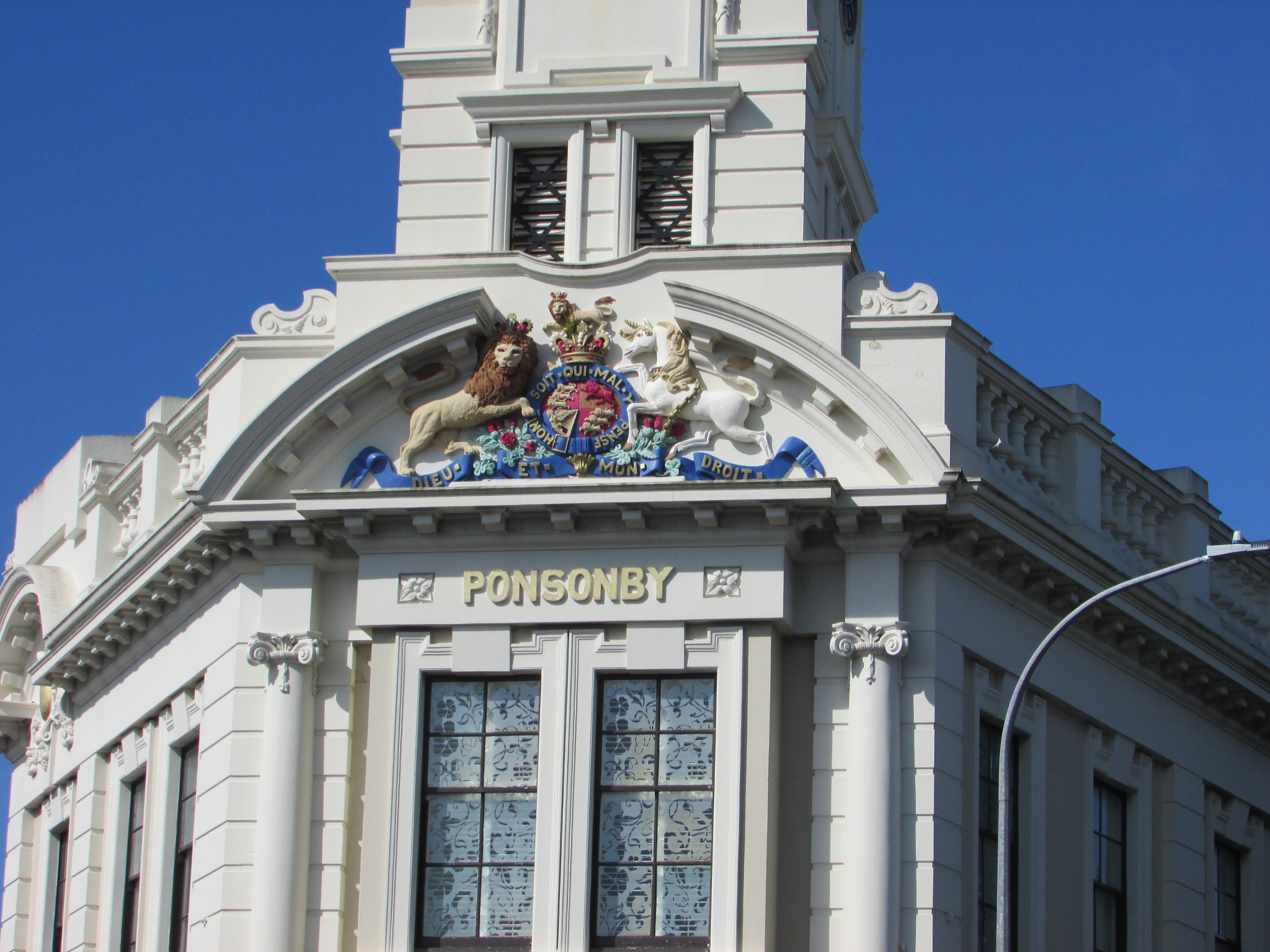
The Ponsonby Post Office features the Royal Arms

The Ponsonby Post Office is a heavily ornamented Edwardian Baroque building. The building forms a triangle with the entrance being the peak of it. It has a balustraded parapet and elaborate façade.

== Significance ==
Stuff referred to the building as one of the most recognisable heritage buildings in Auckland.

The building is highly regarded by the local residents and it serves a landmark for the Three Lamps area.
