= Eddie Lund and His Tahitians =

Tahitian musical group

- Origin: Tahiti
- Labels: Decca, ABC-Paramount, Tahiti Records
- Past members: Eddie Lund

Eddie Lund and His Tahitians were a Tahitian music band led by Eddie Lund in the 1950s and 1960s. They were very popular with the style of music played back then which was a lively Tahitian style of music.

It was reported in Billboard magazine 30 June 1958 that the only Tahitian music heard in New York was Eddie Lund's music. He wanted to stop the American distribution side of it as he wanted his music to remain a tourist attraction.

Eddie Lund has been referred to as the Irving Berlin of Island music and the father of modern Tahitian folk music.

== Discography ==
- Rendezvous In Tahiti, (1954) Decca Records 8189
- I Remember Tahiti, Tahiti Records EL 1005
- Tahitian Paradise (1963) ABC-Paramount
