= Eddie Lund =

American pianist (1909–1973)

- Also known as: Eddy Lund
- Born: October 12, 1909
- Died: December 4, 1973 (aged 64) Los Angeles, California, U.S.
- Genres: Polynesian folk music
- Occupation: Musician
- Years active: 1930s–?
- Labels: ABC-Paramount, Decca Records, Tahiti Records, Viking

Eddie Lund (October 12, 1909 – December 4, 1973) was a pianist and bandleader.

He grew up in Vancouver, Washington, USA, and later moved to Oregon where he worked as a pianist. He later moved to Tahiti in either 1936 or 1938 where he stayed permanently and published and released many records. He was the leader of a popular band, Eddie Lund and His Tahitians which released records on the ABC-Paramount, Decca and Tahiti labels. He picked up the Tahitian language quickly and secured a residence at Quinns night club in Papeete.

Much of Tahiti's music has been written by him. Lund has been referred to as the Irving Berlin of Island music and the father of modern Tahitian folk music. He died in 1973.

== Discography ==
- Rendezvous in Tahiti, (1954)
- Lure of Tahiti, (1959)
- Meet Me in Tahiti, (1961)
- Eddy Lund Tahiti, (1961)
- Eddy Lund Tahiti Dances, (1961)
- Make Mine Tahitian, (1962)
- Maori Lullabye (1962)
- Echoes from a Distant Lagoon (1962)
- Eddy Lund Bar Lea VE 39 (1962)
- Tahitian Paradise (1963) ABC-Paramount
- Eddy Lund Tahiti Mon Amour Viking V-80 (1965)
- A Night in Tahiti VE 74 (1964)
- Meet Me in Tahiti! VP 21 (?)
- Let's Dance Tahitian VP60 (?)
