= Jodi Vaughan =

Australian-born country singer, songwriter, musician, television performer

- Born: 25 April 1950 (age 76); Sydney, Australia
- Occupations: Singer, actress
- Labels: RCA, CBS, EMI, Festival, Challenge Records, BMG New Zealand, WSM

Jodi Vaughan (born 25 April 1950) is an Australian-born country singer, songwriter, musician, television performer, and actor from Hamilton, New Zealand.

== Background ==
Vaughan's career was given a boost when she appeared on the television show, That's Country which was hosted by Ray Columbus.

== Career ==
Vaughn and Tom Sharplin recorded their version of "Hey Paula". It was a Top Country Duet of the Year Award winner for 1984.

It was reported in the Audio Track section of the 20 June 1987 issue of Billboard that Vaughan was in Sugar Hill Recording Studios in Houston, working with producers, Andrew Bradley and Rob Parrish. The musicians she was working with were, Rick Gordon on guitar, Paul English on piano, Rick Robertson on bass, and Parish on drums. Bradley was also the engineer.

In 2022, Vaughan's album For the Love of Country made No. 1 on the charts.

In 2024, she was inducted into the Gore Country Music Hands of Fame in New Zealand for her contribution to country music.

It was reported in the 26 January 2026 issue of the Waikato Herald that after a career spanning five decades, Vaughan had been inducted into the Tamworth Hands of Fame in Australia.

== Television roles ==
- Regular appearances on That's Country in the 1980s
- Sir Howard Morrison: Time of My Life (1995) (TV)

== Awards ==
- 1982 Most Promising Female Vocalist
- 2004 Scroll of Honour from the Variety Artists Club of New Zealand
- 2023 Benny Award from the Variety Artists Club of New Zealand

== Played with ==
- Eddie Low ( featured in Te Papa first on-line exhibition)
- The Musicians at Large (backed many tours)
- Sound Engineer
- First appearance at Tamworth Country Music Festival in 2020

== Discography ==
- Fairweather Friends with Brendan Dugan (1982)
- No Fool Like an Old Fool with Brendan Dugan (1982)
- Rodeo Eyes (1984)
- Touch Your Heart (1985) EMI (featuring Ross Burge and Martin Winch)
- Straight From the Heart (1986)
- Together Again with Gray Bartlett & Brendan Dugan (1990)
- Christmas in New Zealand (1990)
- Together Again: The Reunion with Brendan Dugan & Gray Bartlett (1995)
- All the Best (Their Greatest Hits) with Brendan Dugan & Gray Bartlett (2014)
- That's Country TV Show DVD: Suzanne Prentice, Patsy Riggir, Jade Hurley, Eddie Low, Tony Williams, John Grenell, Jeff Rea, Peter Posa, Ritchie Pickett, Jodi Vaughan and more...
- Kiwi Country – From Auckland, New Zealand To Texas – US release
- You Look Silly Cryin' (single, 2020)
- For the love of country (2022), her 10th album, almost entirely self-penned

== See also ==
- Country music
