= Electoral results for the district of Keira =

Election results for Keira, New South Wales, Australia

Keira, an electoral district of the Legislative Assembly in the Australian state of New South Wales, was created in 1988 and has been held by the Labor party.

== Members ==
Election	Member	Party
1988	Col Markham	Labor
1991	Col Markham	Labor
1995	Col Markham	Labor
1999	David Campbell	Labor
2003	David Campbell	Labor
2007	David Campbell	Labor
2011	Ryan Park	Labor
2015	Ryan Park	Labor
2019	Ryan Park	Labor
2023	Ryan Park	Labor

== Election results ==
=== 2023 ===
2023 New South Wales state election: Keira
Party	Candidate	Votes	%	±%
Labor	Ryan Park	28,938	57.8	+4.3
Liberal	Noah Shipp	10,924	21.8	−5.7
Greens	Kit Docker	7,297	14.6	+1.7
Sustainable Australia	Andrew Anthony	2,867	5.7	+1.7
Total formal votes		50,026	96.9	+0.2
Informal votes		1,589	3.1	−0.2
Turnout		51,615	89.6	−2.0
Two-party-preferred result
Labor	Ryan Park	34,592	74.2	+5.9
Liberal	Noah Shipp	12,059	25.8	−5.9
Labor hold		Swing	+5.9	

=== Elections in the 2010s ===
==== 2019 ====
2019 New South Wales state election: Keira
Party	Candidate	Votes	%	±%
Labor	Ryan Park	27,884	53.69	+0.55
Liberal	Chris Atlee	13,736	26.45	−1.19
Greens	Kaye Osborn	8,248	15.88	+1.83
Sustainable Australia	John Gill	2,068	3.98	+3.98
Total formal votes		51,936	97.07	−0.05
Informal votes		1,567	2.93	+0.05
Turnout		53,503	90.95	−0.62
Two-party-preferred result
Labor	Ryan Park	33,744	69.75	+2.35
Liberal	Chris Atlee	14,635	30.25	−2.35
Labor hold		Swing	+2.35	

==== 2015 ====
2015 New South Wales state election: Keira
Party	Candidate	Votes	%	±%
Labor	Ryan Park	26,893	53.1	+17.1
Liberal	Philip Clifford	13,988	27.6	−7.6
Greens	Elena Martinez	7,110	14.0	−1.6
Christian Democrats	Joseph Carolan	1,703	3.4	+0.2
No Land Tax	Jason Leto	911	1.8	+1.8
Total formal votes		50,605	97.1	+0.8
Informal votes		1,500	2.9	−0.8
Turnout		52,105	91.6	−1.5
Two-party-preferred result
Labor	Ryan Park	31,626	67.4	+14.5
Liberal	Philip Clifford	15,298	32.6	−14.5
Labor hold		Swing	+14.5	

==== 2011 ====
2011 New South Wales state election: Keira
Party	Candidate	Votes	%	±%
Labor	Ryan Park	17,186	39.1	−18.8
Liberal	John Dorahy	15,657	35.6	+15.1
Greens	George Takacs	5,388	12.2	−0.7
Independent	Ray Jaeger	3,684	8.4	+8.4
Christian Democrats	Steven Avasalu	1,492	3.4	−1.5
Socialist Alliance	Paola Harvey	585	1.3	+1.3
Total formal votes		43,992	96.8	−0.8
Informal votes		1,431	3.2	+0.8
Turnout		45,423	94.0	+0.3
Two-party-preferred result
Labor	Ryan Park	20,530	53.8	−18.2
Liberal	John Dorahy	17,604	46.2	+18.2
Labor hold		Swing	−18.2	

=== Elections in the 2000s ===
==== 2007 ====
2007 New South Wales state election: Keira
Party	Candidate	Votes	%	±%
Labor	David Campbell	24,513	57.8	+3.0
Liberal	David Moulds	8,701	20.5	+2.5
Greens	Kate Brandreth	5,469	12.9	−2.7
Christian Democrats	George Carfield	2,092	4.9	+0.5
Independent	Marcus Aussie-Stone	924	2.2	+2.2
AAFI	Maria Patakfalvy	680	1.6	−0.6
Total formal votes		42,379	97.6	+1.2
Informal votes		1,026	2.4	−1.2
Turnout		43,405	93.7	
Two-party-preferred result
Labor	David Campbell	27,245	72.0	−1.5
Liberal	David Moulds	10,576	28.0	+1.5
Labor hold		Swing	−1.5	

==== 2003 ====
2003 New South Wales state election: Keira
Party	Candidate	Votes	%	±%
Labor	David Campbell	22,199	55.9	+10.5
Greens	Michael Sergent	7,684	19.3	+19.3
Liberal	Lee Evans	6,760	17.0	+5.8
Christian Democrats	George Carfield	1,473	3.7	+0.3
AAFI	Garth Fraser	922	2.3	+1.5
One Nation	Frederick Leach	699	1.8	−4.9
Total formal votes		39,737	96.6	−1.3
Informal votes		1,410	3.4	+1.3
Turnout		41,147	94.0	
Notional two-party-preferred count
Labor	David Campbell	27,127	75.5	+3.5
Liberal	Lee Evans	8,781	24.5	−3.5
Two-candidate-preferred result
Labor	David Campbell	24,507	72.5	+14.6
Greens	Michael Sergent	9,298	27.5	+27.5
Labor hold		Swing	+14.6	

=== Elections in the 1990s ===
==== 1999 ====
1999 New South Wales state election: Keira
Party	Candidate	Votes	%	±%
Labor	David Campbell	18,293	45.4	−12.8
Independent	Dave Martin	10,855	26.9	+26.9
Liberal	Alan Akhurst	4,527	11.2	−15.9
One Nation	John Curtis	2,678	6.6	+6.6
Independent	Richard Nederkoom	1,385	3.4	+3.4
Christian Democrats	Robert O'Neill	1,375	3.4	−0.9
Earthsave	Louise Gozzard	855	2.1	+2.1
AAFI	William Hamilton	313	0.8	+0.8
Total formal votes		40,281	97.9	+2.9
Informal votes		866	2.1	−2.9
Turnout		41,147	94.1	
Notional two-party-preferred count
Labor	David Campbell	22,294	72.1	+4.5
Liberal	Alan Akhurst	8,635	27.9	−4.5
Two-candidate-preferred result
Labor	David Campbell	19,821	57.9	−9.7
Independent	Dave Martin	14,390	42.1	+42.1
Labor hold		Swing	−9.7	

==== 1995 ====
1995 New South Wales state election: Keira
Party	Candidate	Votes	%	±%
Labor	Col Markham	18,346	55.3	+3.1
Liberal	Adam Cole	10,010	30.2	−3.0
Democrats	Jeff Warner	2,927	8.8	−0.2
Call to Australia	Robert O'Neill	1,885	5.7	+0.1
Total formal votes		33,168	94.4	+4.6
Informal votes		1,958	5.6	−4.6
Turnout		35,126	94.3	
Two-party-preferred result
Labor	Col Markham	20,293	63.9	+3.4
Liberal	Adam Cole	11,480	36.1	−3.4
Labor hold		Swing	+3.4	

==== 1991 ====
1991 New South Wales state election: Keira
Party	Candidate	Votes	%	±%
Labor	Col Markham	16,339	52.3	+7.3
Liberal	David Moulds	10,361	33.1	−1.4
Democrats	Alan Davidson	2,813	9.0	+9.0
Call to Australia	Robert O'Neill	1,756	5.6	+5.6
Total formal votes		31,269	89.8	−6.8
Informal votes		3,533	10.2	+6.8
Turnout		34,802	94.9	
Two-party-preferred result
Labor	Col Markham	18,052	60.5	+6.0
Liberal	David Moulds	11,780	39.5	−6.0
Labor hold		Swing	+6.0	

=== Elections in the 1980s ===
==== 1988 ====
1988 New South Wales state election: Keira
Party	Candidate	Votes	%	±%
Labor	Col Markham	11,285	38.9	−17.9
Liberal	Ian Brown	10,082	34.7	+7.1
Independent	Patricia Franks	3,928	13.5	+13.5
Independent	Giles Pickford	3,740	12.9	+12.9
Total formal votes		29,035	96.7	−0.7
Informal votes		981	3.3	+0.7
Turnout		30,016	94.5	
Two-party-preferred result
Labor	Col Markham	13,247	50.8	−12.4
Liberal	Ian Brown	12,837	49.2	+12.4
Labor notional hold		Swing	−12.4	
