= Adam Walters =

Australian journalist

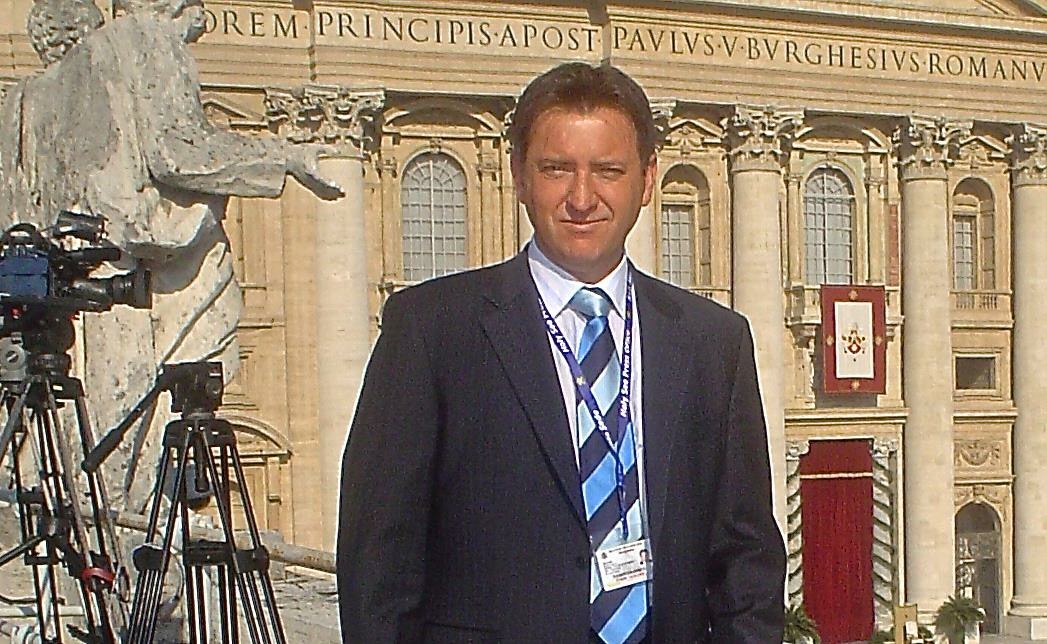

Adam Walters is a Walkley award winning Australian journalist author and Brisbane Bureau Chief for Sky News Australia. Walters cofounded the Kennedy Awards for Excellence in Journalism and worked briefly as a political adviser to former New South Wales Premier, Morris Iemma.

== Journalistic career ==
=== Early career ===
Walters' first job was at The Daily Advertiser, in his home town of Wagga Wagga. In 1985 he moved to Sydney, working as a reporter and newsreader for radio 2WS, 2CH and Triple M Sydney. In 1989 he joined The Daily Telegraph.

=== Television journalism ===
In 1990, Walters made the transition to television, as a crime reporter for the Seven Network. In 2000, he switched to the Nine Network, continuing in the role of crime reporter. He shared a Walkley Award for the Nine News team's coverage of the 2002 Bali bombings, also nominated in the Logie Awards of 2003. In 2006, Walters became the Nine Network's NSW State Political Correspondent, and went on to earn Walkley and Logie award nominations for most outstanding television news reporting in 2007 after a series of stories which led to the resignation of the NSW Police Minister.

==== Kennedy Awards for Excellence in Journalism ====
Following the untimely death of fellow crime reporter and close friend Les Kennedy in 2011 Walters became the cofounder of the journalism awards named in Kennedy's honour. Walters was the driving force of the awards, working as the event director for 10 years and playing a leading role in raising funds for journalists in hardship and charities in the wider community until organising his last gala ceremony in November 2021, after accepting a position as Brisbane Bureau Chief for Sky News Australia.

==== Seven Network ====
On 20 May 2010, Walters broke a story on Seven News in Sydney about the resignation of New South Wales Transport and Roads Minister David Campbell. The story used hidden camera footage of the Minister leaving a sex club in Sydney's eastern suburbs. Upon being told the story would air, Campbell resigned as Minister an hour prior to the news bulletin, and his resignation was accepted by Premier Kristina Keneally. Although former NSW Labor Premier Barrie Unsworth said Campbell's actions were "deplorable" for exposing himself to "blackmail and compromise" the story was criticised by other sections of the media and by politicians. Despite the criticism the Australian Communications and Media Authority (ACMA) ruled Seven's Campbell story was in the public interest. After Labor's 2011 election defeat Fairfax Media's The Sun-Herald State Political editor reported that the story about the former Police Minister and Chair of the NSW Crime Commission was a critical setback for former NSW Premier Kristina Keneally.

In 2012 Walters and Seven News colleagues Lee Jeloscek, Sharri Markson and Michael Mckinnon won the Walkley Award for Television News Reporting for reports demonstrating that the NSW Government had disregarded departmental advice against a ban on regular unleaded petrol.

==== Network 10 ====
Walters joined Network 10 as a reporter in mid-2015. On 9 and 10 February 2016, Ten Eyewitness News broadcast a two-part story by Walters concerning an inquiry held by the Independent Commission Against Corruption (ICAC). The reports included assertions from Sydney businessman Charif Kazal that the inquiry had "destroy[ed]" his reputation, by providing a forum for "baseless" and "false" allegations that he had engaged in corrupt conduct. The first report included a claim from Mr Kazal that the ICAC commissioner at the time was aware there was no evidence to support the allegations, which were not the subject of any recommendation for prosecution.

The reports were based on Kazal's objection to the damage of a "corruption" finding, despite the conclusion in ICAC's final report that: "The Commission is not of the opinion that consideration should be given to obtaining the advice of the DPP with respect to the prosecution of Charif Kazal for an offence under section 249B(2)(b) of the Crimes Act. This is because the Commission does not consider there is sufficient admissible evidence to make out the elements of the offence." ICAC later accepted the advice of the NSW Director of Public Prosecution not to prosecute Charif Kazal for an offence under section 87 of the ICAC Act in relation to his evidence. The second report featured a direct appeal from Mr Kazal to NSW Premier Mike Baird, who agreed to meet the businessman to hear his complaints.

Fairfax Media reported:

The outgoing acting inspector of NSW's anti-graft watchdog has recommended winding back the agency's ability to label people "corrupt" because he says an aspect of the power "undermines the presumption of innocence". Legislation governing the Independent Commission Against Corruption states that such a finding can be made if a person's actions "could" adversely affect those of a public official or authority. People can also be found to have acted corruptly if ICAC decides their actions "could impair" public confidence in public administration, including by fraud or collusive tendering. However John Nicholson, SC, argues the agency should only be able to find a person engaged in corrupt conduct if it "was reasonable" for the commission to expect a "tribunal of fact" would conclude the finding was sustained." Mr Nicholson argues the "problem with the 'could' ... approach is that it undermines the presumption of innocence, which is supposed to apply to all those who remain unconvicted of an offence".

In 2018, almost two years after Walters broke the ICAC/Kazal story, The Australian newspaper revealed Mr Kazal's treatment had been referred to the United Nations Human Rights Committee. In October 2019 The Daily Telegraph reported "the United Nations Human Rights Committee has reactivated an investigation into complaints by Sydney businessman, Charif Kazal, that his human rights have been violated by the NSW anti-corruption watchdog." On November 29 2023 Walters reported on Sky News Australia that the UNHRC had found ICAC had violated Mr Kazal’s human rights, and recommended he be compensated by the Australian Government.

=== Sky News Australia ===
In September 2021 Walters was appointed as Brisbane Bureau Chief for Sky News Australia. In June 2023 he secured an Australian exclusive interview with US Presidential candidate Robert F Kennedy Junior, who discussed his theories on the assassinations of his father Robert Kennedy and his uncle John F Kennedy, in the 60th anniversary year of the Dallas shooting.

=== Print journalism ===
In 2009, Walters reported on the proliferation of illegal brothels in NSW for The Daily Telegraph. The largest was subsequently closed down following a council investigation.

Walters also reported on alleged child sexual abuse in Australian swimming, and a secret police investigation that had been set up to investigate allegations against swimming coach Terry Buck. Four years after he broke the story in 2009 the substance of Walters' coverage was submitted as testimony to the Royal Commission into the Institutional Responses to Child Abuse. Buck was never charged after the same allegations - examined by the Royal Commission - were made to a NSW police taskforce, suddenly disbanded just weeks after its investigations began in the months following the 2000 Sydney Olympic Games.

Walters has co-authored four books, Nightmare on Norfolk, about the murder of Janelle Patton, and The Accidental Gangster – the Life and Times of Bela Csidei, The Face Without A Name - Finding Jane Doe and Cold Cases. All were co-written with fellow crime reporter Norm Lipson. Walters was also a regular contributor to The Bulletin magazine.

== Political involvement ==
In July 2008 he resigned from the Nine Network to work as a communications adviser to New South Wales Premier Morris Iemma. In 2009 he rejoined The Daily Telegraph, becoming the paper's state political editor before returning to the Seven Network in April 2010.
