= Tamworth Country Music Festival =

Annual Australian music festival

Coordinates: 31°05′S 150°55′E

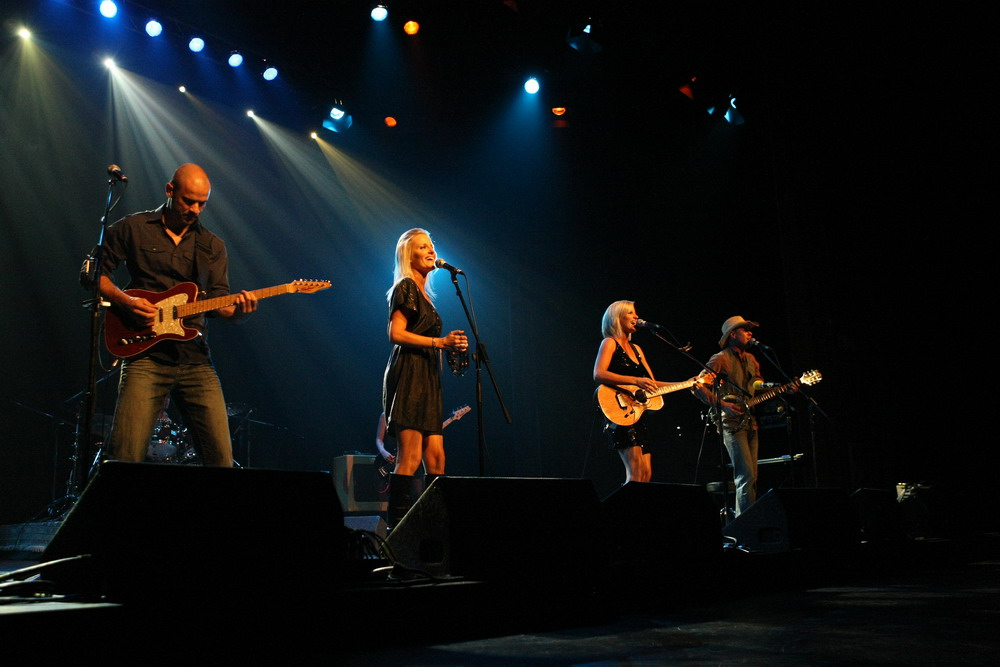
- Genre: Country music; bluegrass; rock; Western swing; world music; folk
- Dates: Mid to late January
- Frequency: Annual
- Locations: Tamworth, Manilla and Kootingal, New South Wales
- Years active: 1972–present (Note: The 2021 event was cancelled due to COVID-19 restrictions, while the 2022 event was postponed until April.)
- Attendance: 40,000 (approx.)
- Website: www.tcmf.com.au

The Tamworth Country Music Festival is an annual Australian music festival held for ten days from Friday to Sunday in mid to late January each year, sometimes including Australia Day, in Tamworth, New South Wales. The festival is the second biggest country music festival in the world, after the CMA Music Festival in Nashville, Tennessee, USA.

The festival is a celebration of country music culture and heritage, in particular the national Australian country music scene, with numerous concerts and live performances at various venues. During the festival the city of Tamworth comes alive with visitors from all across the country and worldwide. The festival has many times been counted among the world's top ten music festivals. In 2007, Forbes rated it as number 8 of the "World's Coolest Music Festivals".

The enormous number of visitors during the bash doubles the city's population and brings significant tourism and economic benefits to the region. Visitor numbers for the 2012 festival were estimated at 50,000. The mass number of visitors means that accommodation throughout the area is consistently booked out for this period up to 12 months in advance, with many visitors camping in caravans, camper vans and tents by the city's riverside and numerous other temporary camping sites throughout the region.

== Media coverage ==
A significant amount of media coverage is given locally and national, in the printed media and also with the three big commercial networks the Nine Network, Seven Network and Ten Network having broadcast news and segments from the festival. There is also national radio coverage from stations including ABC Country, ABC Radio and KIX Country.

== History ==
When the Tamworth Country Music Festival commenced is often debated. In 1968 the then Tamworth branch of the Modern Country Music Association, now the Capital Country Music Association (CCMA), began a talent quest on the Australia Day long weekend in January. The talent quest, now known as the CCMA National Talent Quest, is considered a major influence in what was to become the festival in January 1973 with the first staging, by local radio station, of the Australasian Country Music Awards (a.k.a. the Golden Guitar Awards for its distinctive "golden guitar" trophy) as part of its Country Music Capital promotion which had commenced in 1969.

The festival expanded to many other activities, with events running back throughout the week before the Awards and National Talent Quest staged on what was then the Australia Day long weekend. These events included Bluegrass Championships, Hands of Fame inductions, the Roll of Renown, rodeo events, Coca-Cola Concerts, Toyota Star Maker Quest, Tamworth Songwriters' Association Awards, busking in Peel Street, the Cavalcade and industry seminars among other events. These events were promoted to highlight Australian Country Music and to draw attention to the climax of the 10 days, the Golden Guitar Awards.

Radio 2TM ran the awards until 1993 when they were passed on to the newly formed national industry organisation, the Country Music Association of Australia (CMAA).

The staging of the Golden Guitar Awards moved from Sunday to the Saturday night in the last weekend of the festival in late January as the Australia Day public holiday was moved to float with the 26 January date.

=== Impact of COVID-19 ===
As late as 15 June 2020, the 2021 Festival was set to go ahead. On 8 September 2020 Tamworth Regional Councillors voted to suspend all Tamworth Regional Council run events at the 2021 Toyota Country Music Festival, effectively cancelling the 49th Tamworth Festival. It is the first time in its history the annual event has been cancelled. The annual Golden Guitar Awards were planned to proceed via online streaming. In announcing the decision Festival Manager Barry Harley said "Unfortunately, like so many others in our situation, we have had to surrender to the challenges COVID has placed on us and make the difficult decision to suspend TCMF2021." Tamworth Region Mayor Col Murray also stated that in making the decision council had "the health and safety of our community, our fans, the artists, volunteers, local businesses, staff, and the wider country music industry front of mind." As of 9 September 2020, organisers were confident the 2022 event would proceed as usual, enabling the 50th anniversary of the event to be celebrated. However, on 7 January 2022, the NSW government announced the reintrodction of some COVID control "safety measures". As a result, the festival was postponed to April 2022.

== Music ==
=== Styles ===
Since the festival's original commencement the following music genres have been performed: classic country, bluegrass, country rock, folk, urban country, alternative country, rockabilly, Western swing, country rock'n'roll, yodelling, rock, blues and World music. The festival has diversified in styles of country as the genre country music itself has broadened, additionally other styles of music are played at the festival.

=== Festival awards ===
==== Golden Guitar Awards ====
The CMAA's awards night ceremony is called the Country Music Awards of Australia, in which winning artists are presented with Golden Guitar Award trophies that are miniature replicas of the Golden Guitar statue. These awards are highly coveted in the Australian country music industry. The presentation of awards is regarded as the pinnacle event of the Tamworth Country Music Festival.

==== Other awards and talent quests ====
- Toyota Star Maker Quest|Toyota Star Maker
- Tamworth Songwriters' Association Awards
- Telstra Road to Discovery
- No Holds Barred Fiddle Contest
- Telstra Queen of Country Music Quest
- Aristocrat Junior and Senior Entertainer of The Year
- Kids Talent Quest
- Country Entertainer of the Year

=== Main and Peel streets ===
During the music festival the main shopping street (Peel Street) is restricted to pedestrians only. In this area, buskers are required to register with the local council. There is also a competition between these registered buskers to find the festival's best busker. There has been complaint and controversy about the use of very loud PA systems against acoustic performances. Council officers are known to walk the street with decibel meters during performances. Since January is a summer month with daytime temperatures regularly hovering around 38 °C, it is during the nighttime that the city really comes to life, with people heading down town to drink, dance and generally party while numerous bands play up and down the main street.

== Venues ==
During the festival over 2500 acts use up to 120 venues. The largest venue used is the Tamworth Regional Entertainment Centre which has a capacity of 5100 people.

== Festival Countdown ==
The Festival Countdown is the "pre-festival" festival. During this week before the festival many country music fans come to Tamworth to set up camp and enjoy the city, while there are also dozens of concerts scheduled during this week.

== Attractions ==
Besides the music the festival has many other country music attractions for visitors. These include the Big Golden Guitar, Country Music Wax Museum, Hands of Fame Park and the National Guitar Museum of successful country music artists. Additionally fine arts, crafts, street performers and markets attract large crowds in Peel St.

The Country Music Cavalcade on the last Saturday of the festival attracts large crowds to Peel Street, with many businesses and musicians participating with floats in the parade.

== Preparation ==
During the buildup prior to the commencement of celebrations, the Tamworth Regional Council takes steps to beautify and secure the city, performing such works as:

- Erecting signs to direct traffic away from hot spots, and reduce congestion.
- Pre-Festival advertising and promotional campaigns.
- Extensive road maintenance.
- Blocking traffic from four blocks of Peel Street, the central shopping district.
- Co-ordinating and tidying the expansive camping grounds.
- Co-ordinating with the CMAA (Country Music Association of Australia) in connection with events.
- Co-ordination with law enforcement and security bodies.

== Artist lineups ==
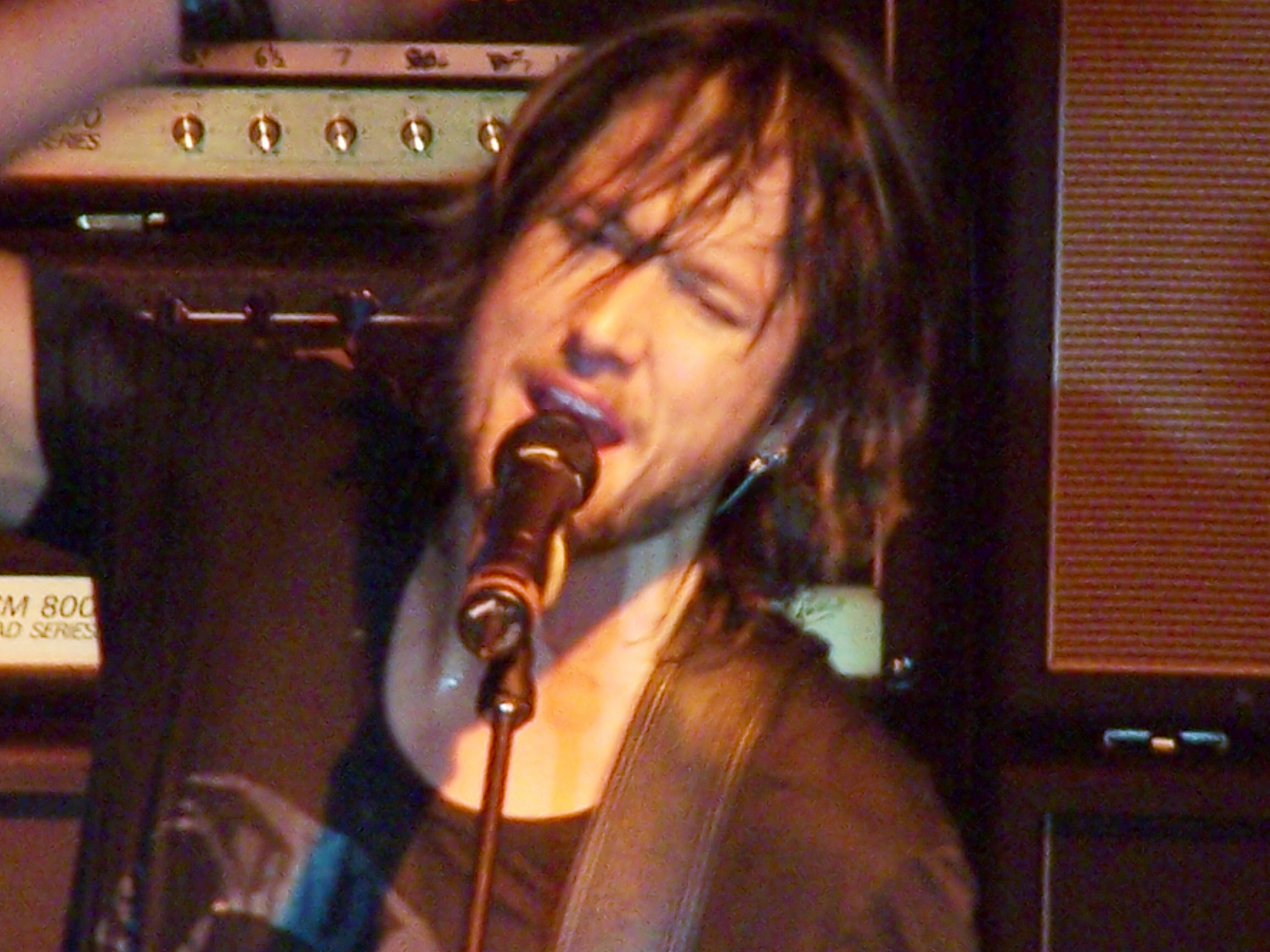
Keith Urban

The Tamworth Country Music Festival attracts many country music, bluegrass, rock and folk musicians to the city each year. Performers perform at various venues in the city. The festival attracts over 800 different artists which perform over 5000 shows.

Artists who perform regularly at the festival include Kasey Chambers, Troy Cassar-Daley, Lee Kernaghan, John Williamson and Colin Buchanan. Other's include Melinda Schneider and Beccy Cole. The late Slim Dusty was also a regular. The festival is noted for being the launching platform of Keith Urban and Kasey Chambers' careers. The Australian country icon Smoky Dawson was also a regular and has a grill called "Smoky's Grill" named in his honour.

The prominence of the festival is such that artists from outside Australia are frequent performers at Tamworth. New Zealand performers in particular are regular attendees, including the likes of Suzanne Prentice, Patsy Riggir, Brendan Dugan, Dusty Spittle, and The Warratahs.

Many hundreds of musicians played at the 2012 festival at clubs, pubs and in Peel St, busking. Some of the better known artists that performed at the 2012 festival or have performed in the past include:

- Adam Harvey
- Amber Lawrence
- Catherine Britt
- Beccy Cole
- Kasey Chambers
- Troy Cassar-Daley
- Lee Kernaghan
- Bill Chambers
- Tommy Emmanuel
- Bobby Cash
- Melinda Schneider
- Mr Cowboy 62
- Felicity Urquhart
- The McClymonts
- Carter and Carter
- Aleyce Simmonds
- The Sunny Cowgirls
- Gina Jeffreys, Walk of Life annual walk
- Harmony James
- Kiara Rodrigues

== See also ==
- List of country music festivals
- List of festivals in Australia
- Gympie Muster
- Mildura Country Music Festival
