= Gold Guitar Awards =

New Zealand country and western music awards

The MLT New Zealand Gold Guitar Awards are annual awards for New Zealand country and western music. The awards are held annually each June in Gore, in the southern South Island, as part of that town's Tussock Country Music festival.

The awards have been held regularly since 1974. No awards were held in 2020 due to the COVID-19 pandemic.

Awards are held in several categories by style of music and by age group. The original (senior) award has been augmented over the years with junior and age-group categories. International guests have attended and presented the awards over the years, among them Freddy Fender, George Hamilton IV, Ricky Skaggs, and Glen Campbell.

Additions to a "Hands of Fame" structure, featuring handprints of prominent country musicians, have been part of the awards festival since 1992, with the prints finding a permanent home in 2004.

The awards gained negative publicity in 2025 over claims of racism against Māori performers.

== Award winners ==
Annual award winners in the senior category have been:

- 2026 — Simon Thompson
- 2025 — Keily Smith
- 2024 — Amy Maynard
- 2023 — Zac Griffith
- 2021 — Melissa Partridge
- 2020 — no award due to Covid-19
- 2019 — Jaydin Shingleton
- 2018 — Arun O'Connor
- 2017 — Jenny Mitchell
- 2016 — Alice Fraser
- 2015 — Kelvin Cummings
- 2014 — Cameron Luxton
- 2013 — Cheryl Anderson
- 2012 — Kylie Price
- 2011 — Vickie Evans
- 2010 — Saelyn Guyton
- 2009 — Helen Van Der Linden
- 2008 — E-Liza
- 2007 — Kaylee Bell
- 2006 — North v South
- 2005 — Aaron Jury
- 2004 — Cameron Clayton
- 2003 — Jane Clarkson
- 2002 — Louise Wilson
- 2001 — Sheryl Higgs
- 2000 — Bryan Townley
- 1999 — Melissa Daisley
- 1998 — Camille Te Nahu
- 1997 — Mikaela Dewar
- 1996 — Paul Sharplin
- 1995 — Kelly Blanchard
- 1994 — John Fletcher
- 1993 — Martin Colquhoun
- 1992 — Kylie Harris
- 1991 — Bob Mason & The Apache
- 1990 — Sam Mihaere
- 1989 — Dennis August
- 1988 — Siteri Temple
- 1987 — Marianne Stephens
- 1986 — Vicki Galloway
- 1985 — Southern Country
- 1984 — Peter Cairns
- 1983 — Gena Geeson
- 1982 — Craig Loader
- 1981 — Brian Mccauley
- 1980 — Jenny Blackadder
- 1979 — Jeanie Thomas
- 1978 — Noel Parlane
- 1977 — Ovation
- 1976 — Janice Ramage
- 1975 — Joy Pirie
- 1974 — Patsy Riggir
