= Jeff Rea =

- Born: 1959 (age 66–67); Crookston, New Zealand
- Genres: Country
- Occupations: Musician, road manager, farmer
- Instruments: Guitar, voice
- Years active: 1980 - present
- Labels: Golden Editions, Mirage, Music World

Jeff Rea is a New Zealand country and rock singer who has been performing since the late 1970s. He wrote the hit "Miles Across the Bedroom" for Gary Morris.

== Background ==
Jeff Rea was born to a farming family in Crookston, New Zealand in 1959. The youngest in the family, he had five older sisters.

Rea's interest in music began in 1965 when one of his sisters came home with a guitar. He had started learning classical piano at the age of eight but soon he graduated to guitar. He would play along to the music of the Doobie Brothers, Uriah Heap and Black Sabbath. From the age of twelve, he would play music with Alec Bathgate who lived in a neighboring farm. Bathgate would later find success in New Zealand's punk-rock and indie rock scenes.

It was in his teens that he went back to the acoustic guitar and was listening to Jim Croce, Don McLean and John Denver. Denver had a big impact on him musically.

Rea made a name for himself in New Zealand and then he embarked on a music journey that took him to the United States.

Rea is also the New Zealand Songwriters Trust chairman. He is also the chairpoerson of the Tussock Festival Trust which oversees the Tussock Country Music Festival.

== Career ==
Rea got his break in 1980 when he won the first MLT Songwriting Award.

His first album, First Steps was released in 1980.

Rea released the single, "I'd Rather Be a Cowboy" / "Time in a Bottle" on Mirage MAS301 in 1982.

It was in 1983 on the set of the New Zealand country television show That's Country that Rea met Gary Morris. They got on well and within eighteen months, Morris had convinced him to come to the United States. Rea began as a soundman-truck driver for Morris. Later he graduated to monitor engineer and then having a significant role in his band.

Having been signed by Gary Morris as staff-writer for Morris' publishing company Logrhythm Music, he started composing songs with him. One song, "Bread and Water" was included on Morris' 1989 album Stones. Three more compositions were included on the next two albums. One of them was a song that Rea co-wrote with Lester S. Moore. The song "Miles Across the Bedroom" was a hit on the US Country chart, peaking at No. 47. He also had become a member of Morris' band, playing acoustic guitar and as a backing vocalist.

In 1995, Rea recorded and released his Full Circle album. The album which was produced by Gary Morris featured well-known Nashville musicians, Brent Rowan and Mark Casstevens on guitars, Michael Rhodes on bass and Dan Dugmore on steel ghuitar. Also, that year, he and his wife returned to New Zealand to raise their family on the farm at Crookston.

Rea co-produced Max McCauley's Back to the Mountains album that was released in 1999. He also produced the Country My Way album for Margaret Bates that was released the following year.

He played acoustic guitar on Marie Haslemore's Patu Manawa album that was released in 2002.

Rea went back to Nashville and recorded his Who I Am album which was released in 2018.

In May 2019, Rea, Jenny Mitchell, and her father Ron Mitchell performed a tribute song for NZ country music pioneer Dusty Spittle who died in December 2018.

In 2000, Rea played the title role in the musical Jesus Christ Superstar.

As of late 2025, Rea was still the chairman of the Tussock Country Music Festival trust.

In 2026, both he and Nichi Russell worked as musical directors of Jesus Christ Superstar which was staged by the West Otago Theatrical Society.
