= Tom Sharplin =

- Born: Thomas Richard Sharplin; 5 April 1949 (age 77); Auckland, New Zealand
- Genres: Rock and roll
- Occupation: Singer
- Instrument: Voice
- Years active: 1960s - present
- Labels: Mirage, Music World, RCA, Kontact Records, Pye, Festival, Reaction Records
- Formerly of: Tom Sharplin and the Rockets, Tom Sharplin and the Cadillacs

Tom Sharplin is a New Zealand rock and roll singer who has been performing since the 1960s. As a solo artist he had hits with "Love Is a Beautiful Song" and "Pretty Blue Eyes".

== Background ==
Tom Sharplin grew up in Tauranga, New Zealand. This is where he was first exposed to the music of rock 'n' roll. It was at age fourteen when he saw Kinks, Manfred Mann, The Honeycombs and New Zealand singer Tommy Adderley on stage that gave him the desire to be a performer. Adderley was the one who made an impression on him. He did some early performances in his town, but he had aspirations to be a full-time performer in Auckland. He wanted to make a living at it so he took singing lessons.

When Sharplin was six years of age, he and his brother were riding on the back of his uncle's tractor. The tractor hit a tree stump which caused him to fall off. One of plough-discs ran over Tom's right foot. he lost his foot and the top of a finger. Six years later, the leg was amputated 15 cm below the knee to allow for a better fit with his prosthetic leg.

Sharplin is the president of the Variety Artist Club in New Zealand and has held that position since 2005.

Sharplin was instrumental in helping Russell Crowe in his music career and advising him to take a performing name which was Russ Le Roq.

== Career ==
=== 1960s to 1970s ===
In late 1971, Sharplin released his first single, "Love Is a Beautiful Song" / We've Got a Groovy Thing Going". The single was a hit and peaked at No 12 on the New Zealand national charts. In 1973, he released "Love Is a River" / "I'll Get Along" on the Kontact label. In 1974, he released "Heart Beat" / "Give Me A Dream", also on the Kontact label.

In 1978, he released his Rock Around the Clock album on the Music World label. The album was also issued as Rock'n'Roll.

Tom Sharplin & The Rockets were booked to appear at the Aranui hotel in Christchurch from 6–11 February 1978.

Two singles from Sharplin's Rock Around the Clock aka Rock 'n Roll album were released on the Mirage label in 1979. They were "Pretty Blue Eyes" / "I Knew the Bride" which made it to No. 39 on the New Zealand national top forty and "Blue Moon"/"Three Steps to Heaven".

=== 1980s - 1990s ===
In 1982 he formed the group, Tom Sharplin and the Cadillacs. He did well with the band over the next four decades. They were the resident band at his ownAuckland nightclub, King Creoles. Also in the same period he was the star of the Television New Zealand show Rock Around the Clock.

With Jodi Vaughan, Sharplin recorded Hey Paula. The song was a Top Country Duet of the Year Award winner for 1984.

=== 2000s to present ===
In July 2012, Sharplin and his backing band, The Cadillacs performed to a capacity crowd at the Coronation Hall in Otago. This was part of his Operatunity daytime concert series national tour.

In 2025, Sharplin presented singer Dinah Lee with a Benny Award.
