= Eddie Low =

Eddie Low MNZM
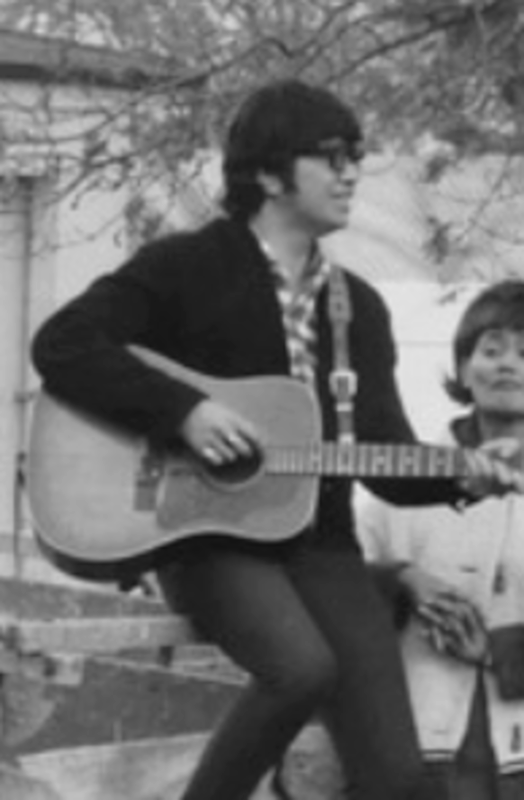
- Low in the early 1970s

Background information
- Born: Edward Robert Low; 14 May 1943; Rotorua, New Zealand
- Died: 21 September 2024 (aged 81) Christchurch, New Zealand
- Genres: Country
- Occupations: Singer; musician
- Instruments: Vocals; guitar; brass; keyboards; strings
- Years active: 1964–2024
- Labels: RCA; Sony Music; EdRab; BMG; Sunshine Records; Rajon Music; MAL Records
- Formerly of: New Zealand Highwaymen; The Truetones; The Quin Tikis
- Website: eddielow.co.nz

Edward Robert Low MNZM (14 May 1943 – 21 September 2024) was a New Zealand country singer and musician, with a career spanning over 60 years. Low released a number of successful country albums and singles throughout the 1970s and 80s and performed in a number of groups since the 1960s including The Quin Tikis and the New Zealand Highwaymen. Low continued to record and release music throughout his life, enjoying a second wave of success in the 2010s after releasing his career overview album The Voice In A Million (2011) which went platinum. He was awarded Member of the New Zealand Order of Merit for services to music in the 2006 Queen's Birthday Honours.

Low began his career in the early 1960s with his brother in the Auckland-based group The Chevronaires, where he met John Rowles. The pair moved to Australia performing Beatles covers before moving to Sydney and becoming part of The Sundowners, joining the Miller's brewery circuit. Low later joined The Truetones for a period before becoming part of The Quin Tikis in the mid-1960s, performing in Australia and New Zealand for several years and appearing regularly in the annual tours of Miss New Zealand Extravaganza organised by Joe Brown. Low was encouraged by Brown to go solo, dubbing him "the voice in a million", and signed to Joe Brown Records, releasing his debut solo album Presenting The Golden Voice Of Eddie Low in 1970.

In the 1970s, Low collaborated with John Hore, releasing Eddie Low and John Hore Live (1971) and We Should Be Together (1972). Low went on to tour North America and released several albums and EPs including The Voice In A Million (1970), Eddie Low (1973), and Eddie Low in USA and Canada (1976). Following the tour, he entered a recording hiatus. Low returned in 1980, signing to RCA Records and releasing Eddie Low Sings (Songs of Home). Throughout the 1980s, he released a number of singles and several more albums including Easy Temptations (1981), Blue Smoke (1982), Country Greats (1984) and Heart and Soul (1984), and periodically returned to Christchurch to appear in That's Country hosted by Ray Columbus.

In 1986, Low launched his own record label, MAL Records, which he used to publish personal projects including "I Am Me", a single about his feelings around being labelled handicapped, and the albums Turning Back The Clock and Land of my Mother, Land of my Father, the latter reflecting his mixed Scottish and Māori heritage. Low continued recording music and performing throughout the 1990s through RCA Records, BMG and Sony Music, including Eddie Low (1992). In the 2000s, Low toured with the New Zealand Highwaymen and continued writing music, and moved to live in Christchurch in 2008.

In 2011, Low's compilation album The Voice In A Million (The Very Best Of Eddie Low) spent twenty-two weeks on the chart and peaked at number two, going platinum. He followed up in Icon (2012) and This Could Be the Last Time (2017), the latter published under EdRab Music, a new label he created for his later projects, and returned to touring with the New Zealand Highwaymen in a series of successful shows. Despite ailing health from a cancer diagnosis, Low continued to record music and tour until his death in 2024, with albums such as Paint Me a Memory (2020) and When I Sing About You (2021).

During his lifetime, Low was a celebrated country music singer, receiving extensive radio play on country stations, and won numerous awards including New Zealand Entertainer and Songwriter of the Year, the Variety Artists Club Scroll of Honour, the Country Music Legend Award, the Benny Award, and the Rockonz International Star Award, among others.

== Early life ==
Low was born in Rotorua on 14 May 1943 with his twin brother. His mother, Rangi Ratana McRoy, had contracted rubella and tuberculosis during pregnancy. As a result, Low was born blind and his twin brother did not survive. McRoy died shortly after from the illness, aged 18.

His father, Robert McRoy, was unable to cope as a single parent. Low and his older brother David were sent to live with several other children in the home of Maria Low, a widow who was a cousin of their mother. She officially adopted Low, fearing he would be institutionalised due to his blindness.

As a child, Low lived in Auckland and attended the Foundation for the Blind. At age 12 after surgeries on his eyes, he gained partial sight in his left eye. He started his first band, the Three Blind Mice, with two of his friends when he was 13.

Low began his professional career in music in the years after leaving school, joining a group called The Chevronaires with his brother David, which had a residency at the Picasso club in Auckland. It was there he met and befriended John Rowles. In 1964, the pair began performing Beatles covers, taking up a six month contract in Melbourne, Australia at the Riverside Inn.

== Career ==
Eddie Low had a unique voice and was dubbed "the voice in a million" by Joe Brown, who signed him as a solo artist. He would often use falsetto in his songs and yodel. Low was also a multi-instrumentalist, often playing the trumpet, but was also proficient with other instruments including guitar, keys, flute, and violin.

=== 1964: Move to Australia and The Sundowners ===
In 1964, Low moved to Australia with fellow entertainer John Rowles as a duo. Low and Rowles had become friends playing in the band The Chevronaires at the Picasso club in Auckland. They secured a six month contract to play at the Riverside Inn, an establishment in Melbourne, performing covers of songs by The Beatles. The gig involved two shows per night, complete with Beatles wigs, earning them the name "the New Zealand Beatles".

After the contract ended, the pair moved to Sydney seeking opportunities in Kings Cross, where they discovered fellow musician Graham Willoughby, who had been in The Chevronaires, in a new band called The Dingdongers. Low and Rowles joined the group, which then auditioned at the Sundowner Hotel for the Miller’s Brewery circuit, and were successful in securing the gig. They renamed the group to The Sundowners. The group also had residency at The Civic Hotel, during which they recorded a single for Sunshine Records named "The End (Of A Rainbow)" which was fronted by Rowles.

=== 1965–1969: The Truetones and The Quin Tikis ===
After Rowles went solo, Low joined a band called The Truetones for a period, before his skills as a multi-instrumentalist saw him join The Quin Tikis in 1966 as a singer and trumpet player. He also appeared in the musical comedy film Don't Let It Get You, appearing alongside Howard Morrison and Kiri Te Kanawa, among others. The group performed in Australia and New Zealand, and were regulars on the annual Miss New Zealand Extravaganza tours and the Country and Western NZ Show, both organised by impresario Joe Brown.

=== 1970–1979: Solo career and hiatus ===
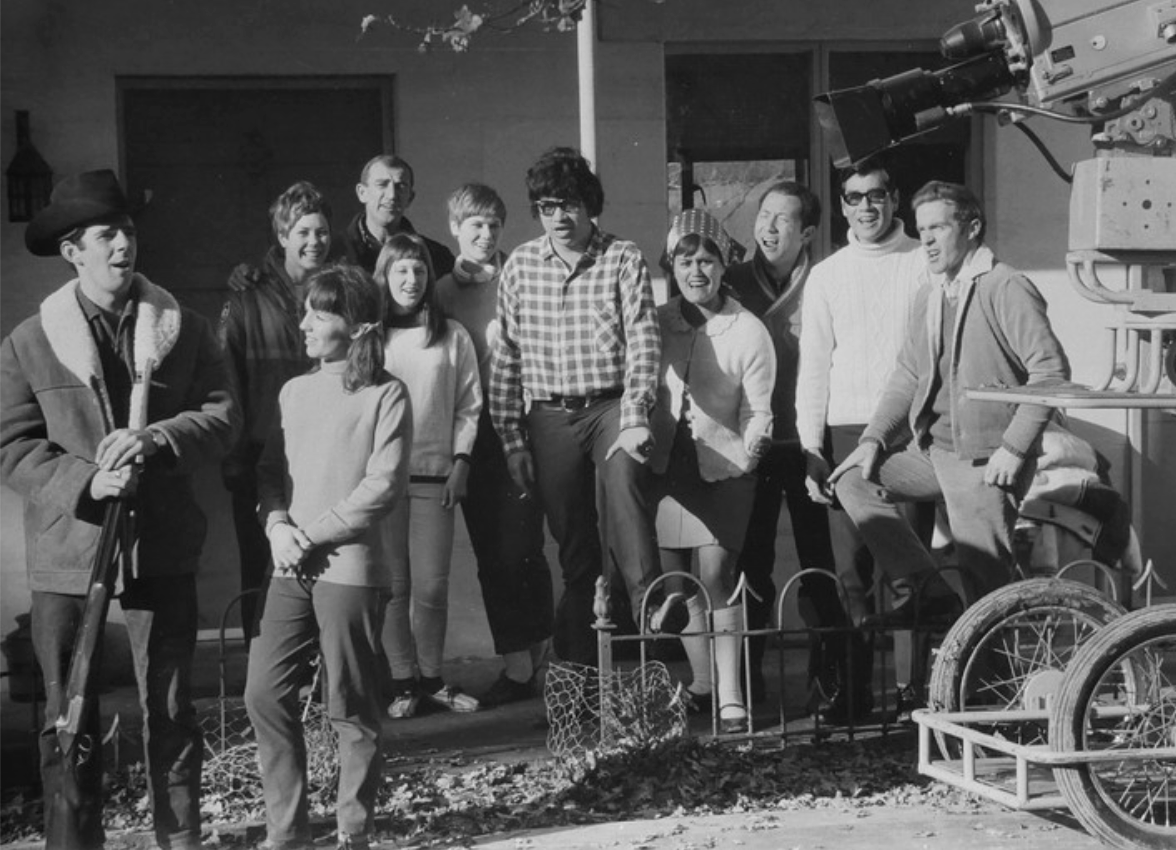
Low and Hore with crew from the Miss New Zealand Show

In 1969, Brown encouraged Low to leave The Quin Tikis and offered to sign him to his label, Joe Brown Records, as a solo artist. Low agreed. In 1970 he debuted with the albums Presenting The Golden Voice Of Eddie Low and The Voice In A Million. In 1971, Low recorded an EP with John Hore named Eddie Low and John Hore Live. In November that year, Low reunited with Morrison and performed a nightly show along with Billy Peters.

By the mid-1970s, Low had released 11 singles through Brown and several albums and EPs, including a single with his daughter Marie, "Daddy What If". His music received heavy airplay on country radio stations. He began touring in North America, visiting Nashville twice in 1972 and 1973, and visiting Canada on an extended six month tour, recording the live album Eddie Low in USA and Canada which was released in 1976. Following this, Low took a hiatus from recording and releasing new material. He performed locally in the late 70s, including a guest appearance on A Touch of Country, filmed in Christchurch and broadcast on South Pacific Television in 1977.

=== 1980–1996: Return to studio, MAL Records, and recognition ===
In 1980, Low signed to RCA Records and returned with Eddie Low Sings (Songs of Home). Over the next four years, Low released four more albums: Easy Temptations, Blue Smoke, Country Greats and Heart and Soul. Low also periodically visited Christchurch to appear on episodes of That's Country, a TVNZ show hosted by Ray Columbus.

Low received a number of awards and honours during this period, increasingly recognised for his contributions to music. In 1980, he received the New Zealand Entertainer and Songwriter of the Year award. In 1983, he was inducted into the Australian Country Music Hands of Fame with his hand print immortalized at the Tamworth monument. In 1984, he received the Variety Artists Club Scroll of Honour.

In 1986, Low started his own record label, MAL Records (later known as MAL Music Promotions) named after his daughter Maria Ann Low, who he had sung with in the 1975 single "Daddy What If". He released his single "I Am Me" through his label, a reflective piece on his blindness and his feelings about being considered handicapped. Also released through his label was Turning Back The Clock and the two-disc album Land of my Mother, Land of my Father.

In 1992, Low released the album Eddie Low through RCA Records. The following year, he was inducted into the New Zealand Hands of Fame at the monument in Gore. In 1996, Low re-released Heart and Soul through BMG and released the compilation album Eddie Low: New Zealand’s International Singing Star.

=== 1997–2012: New Zealand Highwaymen and renewed success ===
In 2004, Rajon Music re-released Turning Back The Clock and Land of my Mother, Land of my Father as a three-disc collection.

Throughout the 2000s, Low toured across New Zealand, including in 2003 with his Roy Orbison tribute show, and reuniting with John Hore for the Highway of Legends tour with Gray Bartlett and Brendan Dugan. In 2008, Low and his wife left their home in Sydney and moved to Christchurch to live.

In 2006, Low's long career and contributions were recognised and he was awarded the Member of the New Zealand Order of Merit for services to music in the 2006 Queen's Birthday Honours.

In 2011, Low released The Voice In A Million (The Very Best Of Eddie Low), a compilation album reflecting on highlights of his career. The album was a commercial success going platinum, spending twenty two weeks on the charts, including two weeks peaking at number two, and reviving mainstream interest in Low's catalogue. It was the fifteenth best-selling album in New Zealand that year and the fourth best-selling album by a New Zealand artist in 2011. He followed up in 2012 with Icon released by Sony Music, and founded a new record company called EdRab Music, spelled as a blend of "Eddie Rabbit", a reference to his wife Kathleen who was affectionately nicknamed "bunny".

=== 2013–2024: Final projects and illness ===
In 2017, Low released This Could Be the Last Time through his label EbRab.

In February 2019, while touring in Australia, his wife Kathleen suddenly died of a heart attack. Her body was flown back to Christchurch where a service was held. Low went into a period of mourning and began losing weight. His daughter, Tania, was a cancer nurse and became concerned for Low as he began showing symptoms of illness, pushing him to see a doctor, which confirmed cancer. Low had a series of operations to remove a tumors, and his health initially improved.

In his final years, Low toured with Dennis Marsh, Gray Bartlett and Brendan Dugan in the New Zealand Highwaymen band, in a series of successful shows. Near the end of the tour during one of their shows, Low collapsed minutes before a performance at the Hokitika Regent Theatre, and was taken to hospital. He was transferred to Christchurch Hospital for nine days, leaving to attend his 80th birthday celebration.

In July 2023, Low was diagnosed with diffuse gastric cancer and his condition became publicly known. He battled cancer for over a year including the complete removal of his stomach, and endured significant weight loss, becoming unfit to tour and being forced to withdraw from events. Low died in Christchurch on the morning of 21 September 2024, aged 81, reportedly surrounded by his family.

== Personal life ==
Low is of Scottish and Māori descent from his father and mother's side, respectively. He was born with blindness and gained only partial vision in his left eye at the age of 12 after multiple surgeries.

Low had three girls with his wife, Kathleen Joyce Low. He named his record label MAL after their firstborn daughter Maria Ann Low. In early 2019 while visiting Australia during one of Low's tours, Kathleen died suddenly from a heart attack. In the years after, Low started a relationship with his new partner, Kerry, which lasted until his death.

Throughout his life, Low spent time living and performing in both Australia and New Zealand. Low had a home in Sydney where he lived in the late 1970s, periodically returning to Christchurch to perform and appear on TV shows including That's Country. In 2008, Low moved back to New Zealand to live in Christchurch, which was also the hometown of his late wife.

In July 2023, Low was diagnosed with diffuse gastric cancer and battled the condition for over a year, including the complete removal of his stomach which caused significant weight loss and forced him to withdraw from events. Low died in Christchurch on the morning of 21 September 2024, aged 81. His funeral service took place in Christchurch on 26 September and was streamed live, viewed thousands of times.

== Honours and awards ==
- New Zealand Entertainer and Songwriter of the Year, 1980
- Country Music Recording Artists’ Awards, 1981
- Australia Country Hands of Fame, 1983
- Variety Artists Club Scroll of Honour, 1984
- New Zealand Hands of Fame, 1993
- Member of the New Zealand Order of Merit, for services to music, in the 2006 Queen's Birthday Honours
- Country Music Legend Award, 2009
- Benny Award, Variety Artists Club of New Zealand, 2009
- Rockonz International Star Award, 2010
- Attitude ACC Supreme Award for Artist Achievement, 2011
- New Zealand Walk of Fame (2023)

== Discography ==
=== Solo albums ===
- Presenting The Golden Voice Of Eddie Low (1970)
- The Voice In A Million (1970)
- Eddie Low (1973)
- Eddie Low in USA and Canada (1976)
- Eddie Low Sings (Songs of Home) (1980)
- Easy Temptations (1981)
- Blue Smoke (1982)
- Country Greats (1984)
- Heart and Soul (1984)
- Turning Back The Clock
- Land of my Mother, Land of my Father
- Icon (2012)
- Do You Wanna Dance (2014)
- This Could Be the Last Time (2017)
- You Raise Me Up (2019)
- To All The Girls I've Sung Before
- Paint Me a Memory (2020)
- When I Sing About You (2021)

=== EPs ===
- Eddie Low (1970)
- Eddie Low On A Mini Record (1971)
- Eddie Low Live (The Voice In A Million) (1971)
- Joe Brown Presents Eddie Low (1975)

=== Singles ===
- "Bonnie Please Don't Go" (1971)
- "Lonely Women Make Good Lovers" (1972)
- "Help Me Make It Through The Night" (1972)
- "Daddy What If" with Daughter Marie (1975)
- "May God Go With You" (1982)
- "I Am Me" (1990)

=== Collaborative albums and EPs ===
- Eddie Low and John Hore Live (1971)
- We Should Be Together with John Hore (1972)

=== Compilation albums ===
- The Best Of Eddie Low (1972)
- Eddie Low: New Zealand’s International Singing Star (1996)
- The Great Eddie Low (2009)
- The Voice In A Million (The Very Best Of Eddie Low) (2011)
- Selections 2009–2021 (2022)
