= Hadley! =

Australian news commentary TV program

- Genre: Talk show, news, political analysis, commentary
- Presented by: Ray Hadley
- Country of origin: Australia
- Original language: English
- No. of seasons: 1
- No. of episodes: 4

Production
- Production locations: Macquarie Park, New South Wales, Australia
- Running time: 45 mins (inc. adverts)

Original release
- Network: Sky News Australia
- Release: 16 November – 8 December 2010

Hadley! was a short-lived Australian political talk show hosted by commentator Ray Hadley which aired on the Australian subscription television news channel Sky News Australia in 2010 for four episodes.

The program premiered on 16 November 2010. The program was broadcast live across the country from Sky News' Sydney studio in Macquarie Park and aired Wednesday evenings between 8:15 and 9:00 pm.

The program's format consisted of a brief introduction by Hadley followed by an interview with a current federal politician. This was followed by the segment 'thumbs up or thumbs down' where Hadley and one of his guests, usually a journalist, posed pre-written questions to each other where they either agreed or disagreed. The final segment consisted of Hadley and either one of two panellists discussing political and general issues. The show closed with a parody song recorded by the Robertson Brothers.

Hadley resigned from Sky News Australia on the eve of the program's return for 2011. reportedly due to 'differences' and staff not wanting to work with him.

== See also ==
- List of Australian television series
