= Noel Parlane =

New Zealand country singer (1951–2015)

- Born: Noel Linton Parlane; 19 March 1951; Roxburgh, Central Otago, New Zealand
- Died: 21 June 2015 (aged 64) Brisbane, Australia
- Genre: Country
- Labels: Music World; RCA Victor; Capitol Records

Noel Linton Parlane (19 March 1951 – 21 June 2015) was a New Zealand country singer and yodeler who gained popularity during the 1980s with his release of albums on the RCA Victor label.

== Biography ==
Noel Linton Parlane was born on 19 March 1951, in Roxburgh, Central Otago. He spent his early youth in Roxburgh, but moved to Dunedin in the early 1960s, where he attended Kaikorai Valley College. At the age of ten, Parlane routinely appeared on Radio 4XD's children's program where he befriended Trevor Dawe, a pianist, with whom he began appearing in talent shows. The pair performed locally under several titles such as The New Era, 'The Noel and Trev Duo', and finally 'The Sundowners' before splitting up in 1975. In 1977, Parlane won the South Island Country Music Scroll after competing in the South Island Country Music Awards and the following year won the New Zealand Gold Guitar Award, earning him an audition with the New Zealand record label Music World. In 1978, Parlane released his debut album titled Noel Parlane Country, which was certified gold, as were his following four albums. His 1979 release, Country Heartaches, sold over 40,000 copies in Australia, expanding his popularity. Wanting more control over his content, Parlane parted with Music World and was signed by the RCA Victor label, on which he released three albums before relocating to Australia. Before moving to Australia, Parlane frequented on That's Country, a New Zealand country and western television variety show. Although he was unable to reach the same sales of records after he departed from Music World, Parlane continued to make albums and perform both in Australia and New Zealand. He was inducted in both the Tamworth and Gore Hands of Fame.

In 1998, he appeared in Ernest Tubb's Midnite Jamboree.

== Personal life ==
Parlane continued to perform up until his death. After suffering a fall after a performance, he was diagnosed with mesothelioma. He died in Brisbane on 21 June 2015, just two months after the release of his final album Everybody's Here. He was cremated and his ashes were buried at Green Park Cemetery, Dunedin.

== Discography ==
=== Studio albums ===
- Noel Parlane Country (Music World, 1978)
- Country Love (Music World, 1979)
- Country Heartaches (Music World, 1979)
- Old Time Country Music – 20 Golden Greats (Music World, 1981)
- Trucks & Trains (Music World, 1981)
- Drinking Them Beers (RCA Victor, 1982)
- Let’s Sing a Country Song (RCA Victor, 1984)
- Stepping Out (RCA Victor, 1987)
- Can I Count On You (Spectrum Records, 1994)
- Now and Then (Spectrum Records, 1997)
- Choosey (Capitol Records, 2003)
- You Bring Out the Best In Me (Kiwi Pacific Records, 2004)
- No Limits (Lbs Music, 2007)
- Encore (Lbs Music, 2012)
- Everybody's Here (Checked Label Services, 2015)
