= Ray Hadley =

Australian talkback radio broadcaster

Ray Hadley OAM
- Born: Raymond Morris Hadley; 27 September 1954 (age 72); Paddington, New South Wales, Australia
- Occupations: Radio broadcaster, TV personality, football commentator
- Years active: 1982−2024
- Employer(s): Nine Network, 2GB
- Spouse(s): Anne Marie, Suzanne Kielty (m. 1994–2014) Sophie Baird (m. 2021)
- Children: 6
- Website: rayhadley.com.au

Raymond Morris Hadley (born 27 September 1954) is a retired Australian talkback radio broadcaster and a rugby league football commentator for Channel Nine. He presented 2GB Sydney's Monday to Friday morning show, and lead the Continuous Call Team, a rugby league-based talkback radio panel program.

== Early life ==
Ray Hadley was born in 1954 and raised in a "housing commission house in Dundas Valley" Sydney but later went to live with his grandparents on an Eungai Rail farm near Stuart's Point on the mid north coast of New South Wales.

While working as a cab driver, he was offered casual work at the radio station 2UE after giving the then news director, Mark Collier, a ride in his taxi. By 1982, he was covering sports including rugby league and horseracing.

== Radio career ==
=== 2GB ===
In December 2001, Hadley joined 2GB to present the weekend rugby league coverage but when fellow 2UE presenter Alan Jones moved to 2GB from 2UE in April 2002, he began presenting the morning show as well.

Hadley's talkback show started in a traditional local community and state-based current affairs format but later included federal politics. His favourite music genre is country (both traditional and modern). Hadley's opening theme was "Murrumbidgee" by Wolverines, while the closing theme was the instrumental "Last Date" from country pianist Floyd Cramer.

Hadley's program from 9am to midday was also broadcast to 4BC Brisbane, 2CC Canberra and stations across regional New South Wales, Queensland and parts of Victoria. Some of these stations are part of the Southern Cross Austereo Triple M network and are some of the stations which also broadcast the Continuous Call Team.

In May 2011 he became the highest-rating radio announcer on Australian radio with 20.1% of the audience, until being beaten by the top rating Ross and John breakfast program on opposite number 3AW in Melbourne a year later.

On 19 May 2011 Hadley hung up on 7 News reporter Lee Jeloscek during a phone interview. Hadley took offence that Jeloscek wanted to correct something he asserted was suggested on-air before the interview began, and Hadley cut off Jeloscek mid-sentence telling his listeners: No hang on. Whoa, whoa, whoa, whoa, whoa! Listen! Listen! Listen! Listen to me! Listen to me! Listen to me! Goodbye Lee. You seem to forget, Lee, it's the Ray Hadley morning program...

Hadley has been credited with discovering Samoan country singer Sam Ah Chookoon aka Mr Cowboy 62 in 2019.

In November 2024, Hadley announced that he would be retiring from radio after 43 years of service. His final morning show aired on 2GB on 13 December 2024.

=== Awards ===
Hadley was named the best Radio Sports Broadcaster at the RAWARDS on multiple occasions, and was awarded a Medal of the Order of Australia (OAM) in the Queen's Birthday 2002 Honours List for services to rugby league and fund-raising initiatives for charitable organisations.

Hadley won an accolade at the 2006 ACRAs (also known as the RAWARDS) for "Best Current Affairs Presenter". He won that award again 2009 and became the first radio broadcaster to win both that award and best sports commentator. He has won 20 major ACRA Radio awards since 1987.

In December 2021, Hadley was added to the Sydney Cricket Ground Media Hall of Honour.

== Television ==
After commencing as a sports reporter on Channel 7, Hadley was recruited to Channel 9 as part of The Footy Show, along with his radio and rugby league colleague Steve "Blocker" Roach, appearing between 1994 and 1998. He also made a one-off appearance on The Footy Show in 2005 in a forum to discuss brawling and antagonism between Canterbury-Bankstown Bulldogs supporters during a game against the Brisbane Broncos at Telstra Stadium. Hadley has also appeared in TV commercials, and for 17 years was spruiking the budget menswear establishment Lowes.

During 2010, he appeared on The Matty Johns Show on the Seven Network, an NRL-focused program hosted by Matthew Johns.

Also in 2010, Hadley was signed by Sky News Australia to present a weekly current affairs programme entitled Hadley!. The programme aired on Wednesday nights. , Hadley resigned from Sky News Australia after only four episodes, reportedly due to "differences" and staff not wanting to work with him.

In October 2011, Hadley was signed up by Channel 9 to commentate on the 2011 Rugby World Cup semi-final match between the Wallabies and the All Blacks but was not invited to return.

In 2012, he returned to The Footy Show as a panellist on the Five in the Bin segment, commentating alongside Peter Sterling and Paul Vautin on Channel 9's rugby league coverage.

Hadley was one of Channel 9's main play-by-play commentators mainly commentating on Thursday and Friday night games until leaving the position at the end of the 2018.

== Controversies ==
=== Australian Communications and Media Authority ===
Hadley has been repeatedly censured by the ACMA for a range of offences. In 2012, Hadley threatened a protester outside 2GB's premises and later broadcast the protester's name and address on air. It emerged during the investigation that Hadley had got the man's address wrong, instead broadcasting the address of somebody with the same name. The ACMA found against Hadley, finding he breached privacy regulations.

On 25 June 2012, Hadley broadcast a fabricated story stating that school children visiting Parliament would no longer be given snacks because of budget cuts. When the story was denied by the then Federal Treasurer Wayne Swan, Hadley called Swan a liar, stating Swan was a "complete boofhead that didn't know what was happening". Despite repeated requests to retract the story, Hadley refused to do so and was found in breach of the code. Despite clear evidence, Hadley continued to deny that he had lied, stating on air, "Through life you can't win in an argument with the arbiter, with the referee and I can't win in a battle with the Australian Communications and Media Authority despite the fact that I think I'm right,"

=== Athens Olympics ===
In 2004, Hadley was recorded in the middle of an outburst aimed at now-former 2GB news director Justin Kelly at the 2004 Athens Olympics, after Hadley's call of an event at the Games was not used in a news bulletin. His use of the words "fucking spastic" offended organisations that deal with people which such conditions, and Ray made a quick apology and offered his services to the organisations affected for no charge, although none accepted his offer. Also during the outburst, the profane word "fucking" was used 20 times.

A dance version of the outburst was soon created and played on Triple J and soon widely distributed and played around the country.

=== Suspension and reinstatement ===
In February 2013, Hadley was suspended from 2GB after verbally abusing an employee, who recorded the event. Hadley responded to the suspension by contacting the station major shareholder and close friend, John Singleton, demanding to be returned to the air. Singleton agreed and overruled Network managing director Rob Loewenthal. Following this, Hadley gathered 2GB staff into a boardroom, apologised for his behaviour, repeatedly breaking down in tears. Hadley's ratings dropped considerably following the release of details of the suspension. The employee in question sued Hadley, and the case was later settled out of court for an "undisclosed sum", the settlement including an agreement that the recording of Hadley's outburst be suppressed.

=== 2019 bullying allegations ===
In March 2019, a social media post written by former 2GB staff member Chris Bowen contained allegations that he had been the victim of sixteen years of "intense bullying" while working at the station and that he had been subjected to "out of control sheer rage". Bowen initially didn't name the person he was referring to but later confirmed it was Hadley. Bowen's allegations were supported by former 2GB staff member Mark Kennedy who also claimed that he too was a victim of Hadley's alleged bullying.

Bowen said he had complained to 2GB management as far back as 2008 but nothing was done apart from being removed from Hadley's program for a short period of time. A spokesperson for Macquarie Media said that they were unaware of any previous complaints having been made in relation to Bowen's allegations. Hadley responded to Bowen's allegations on his radio program and apologised to Bowen for "any hurt" he may have caused him. Bowen said he rejected Hadley's apology, describing his comments as "gaslighting".

Bowen's allegation prompted ABC Television current affairs program 7.30 to do a special report about Hadley's alleged bullying. On the program, Bowen along with former 2GB staff members Andrew Moore and Jesse Perez and former advisor to state premier Mike Baird, Imre Sulusinsky all made allegations relating to Hadley's behaviour. Responding to the allegations made on 7.30, 2GB said they had not received any formal complaints from Moore, Perez or Bowen.

In a statement, Hadley said he had been "very public" in relation to his past behaviour but if any of the allegations were substantiated, he would like to "make amends" with those affected by his alleged behaviour. He also said he couldn't remember some of the alleged incidents involving Andrew Moore and that he would need more information to properly respond to questions put forward to him about his alleged behaviour involving Chris Bowen and Jesse Perez.

Radio broadcaster Tim Brunero publicly supported the allegations made by Perez. Brunero claimed he had witnessed Perez being summoned to Hadley's studio before later returning and telling Brunero that Hadley had allegedly subjected to him to a "blistering, shrieking tirade that's only possible in a soundproof room". Brunero claimed he had asked Perez to write an account of his encounter with Hadley, and that as of 2019, it was still sitting in his email inbox.

Andrew Hornery, a columnist with The Sydney Morning Herald, also recalled an alleged encounter with Hadley in 2014 when Hadley referred to his sexual orientation on air which had prompted "a deluge of homophobic abuse on social media" from Hadley's listeners. Hadley's reference to Hornery's sexuality had allegedly occurred after Hornery had attempted to get in contact with Hadley to discuss a story about his ex-wife's relationship with former rugby league footballer; Matt Parish. Hornery alleges Hadley said on air that he was "very bitchy, if you know what I mean... And I'm not saying anything other than Mr Hornery admits to being openly gay and from time to time, he can by very bitchy when he writes his columns - very bitchy." Hornery claims Hadley had taken umbrage at describing his comments as homophobic, illustrated by his friendship with gay rugby league footballer; Ian Roberts.

In July 2019, it was reported Bowen had commenced legal proceedings in the New South Wales District Court against Hadley, relating to alleged workplace bullying. Hadley admitted on air to having received notice about Bowen commencing his legal action, and said that he had been subject to "intense public scrutiny" with the allegations made about his behaviour, and that he had already admitted to his "previous shortcomings". Hadley also said his current colleagues would attest to the efforts he has made in recent years to improve his behaviour.

== Legal action ==
=== Andrew Voss ===
In August 2011, a statue of rugby league caller, Ray Warren, co-funded by Ray Hadley's radio station, 2GB, and Channel 9, was unveiled. Andrew Voss, noted on Channel 9 rugby league chat show, The Sunday Roast, that the statue was not a very good likeness. Ray Hadley used his radio show for the two days following the comments to launch attacks on Voss, labelling him a "grub of the highest order", a "moron", and claiming that the gulf between Ray Warren and Andrew Voss, both as commentators and as men, was immeasurable. It was claimed by Voss that Hadley's reaction was due to a perceived snub 17 years earlier when Voss was offered a television role over Hadley.

Voss launched legal action against Hadley which was settled in 2012, with Voss receiving a financial settlement and public apology from Hadley.

=== Greg Smith ===
In April and May 2012, Ray Hadley, on his 2GB radio program, made allegations about then New South Wales Attorney General, Greg Smith, that he gave advice to his friend, Father Finian Egan, that an alleged victim of child sex abuse perpetrated by Egan in the 1970s and 1980s was seeking a $1,000,000 payment. Smith took Hadley to court, with both parties later dropping the case in exchange for Hadley refraining to broadcast further on the matter.

=== Ray Williams ===
Hadley was successfully sued by Liberal Hawkesbury MP Ray Williams. In July 2012 Hadley branded Williams a liar in a fabricated story over a scandal involving allegations of embezzled funds at the Hills Shire. Hadley falsely claimed Williams had known about it as far back as 2008 and covered it up. Three weeks before the trial was due to start, Hadley allegedly aggravated the defamation in a spray about another Liberal MP, Bart Bassett, and his appearance at ICAC. This prompted Williams' barrister, one of Sydney's most formidable silks, Tom Blackburn, SC, to file a contempt of court motion, given that the spray had occurred as a jury was about to be empanelled. Hadley told his audience he looked "forward to any Supreme Court acting involving Mr Williams or any other politician in New South Wales. It might be the only time in history that a so-called shock jock's credibility is running higher than a politician's credibility". The defamation trial was due to begin on Monday just passed (8 September) at 10am. At the 11th hour, the parties sought an adjournment and a settlement was reached. On Wednesday morning Hadley issued a retraction, which he delivered live to air. Williams said the terms of the settlement were confidential, but added: "It's been a long drawn-out process for me and my family. But we are pleased to advise that we are completely satisfied with the outcome."

=== Ahmed court case ===
Hadley was sued by Kim Anne Ahmed. Hadley attacked Mrs Ahmed on air because she continued to support her husband, who had been charged with aggravated indecent assault of a 17 year old employee, and because she took out an AVO against the young victim's father. In an interview with the victim's father in May 2008, Hadley described the fish and chip shop owner's supporters as "vile". Later in the broadcast, Hadley said that if either Mr Ahmed or his "grub of a wife" still owned their shop, "they should completely and utterly be sent out of business". In December 2013, the judge ordered a $280,000 award to Mrs Ahmed, describing the broadcast as "an unbridled tirade" that came "from the gutter".

== Personal life ==
Hadley has two children with his former wife, Anne Marie. Hadley married Suzanne Kielty in 1994 and they had two daughters together. They separated in late 2010 but reconciled a few months later. They separated again in 2014. In May 2014 it was revealed that Hadley had unsuccessfully attempted to have Matt Parish, assistant coach of the New South Wales 2014 State of Origin team, fired from his role after Suzanne and Parish began their relationship.

Hadley married Sophie Baird in March 2021. Baird had worked as Hadley's personal assistant for 16 years. She has two children from a previous marriage.
