= Sam Ah Chookoon =

Samoan musician

- Also known as: Mr Cowboy 62
- Born: Western Samoa
- Genre: Country
- Occupations: Farmer, musician
- Instrument: Guitar
- Years active: 2018-present

Sam Ah Chookoon, also known as Mr. Cowboy 62, is a country singer from Western Samoa. He attracted attention following a guest appearance on the Ray Hadley show on Radio 2GB.

== Background ==
A banana farmer from Vaitoloa in Apia, Western Samoa, Ah Chookoon first fell in love with country music at the age of eight after his father introduced him to it. Johnny Cash is one of his influences. Other music he listened to when he was young were artists such as Jim Reeves, Dwight Yoakam, Charley Pride, George Straight and Patsy Cline. In October 2019 , he made an appearance with guitarist Josh Mase on Radio 2GB show hosted by Ray Hadley. While there Sam with instrumental accompaniment by Josh, he did a cover of Grandpa" which was originally done by The Judds. He made a big impression on the host who said "I’m overwhelmed". Hadley also predicted big things for his future. By December that year he had already attracted millions of views online and thousands of followers across the world with his music. In an interview with The Coconet, he said that he never intended to be the Pied Piper of country but since sharing his music on social media, he was encouraged to see a lot of fellow pacific islanders supporting the genre. By early 2019, he had recorded and released a country song in Samoan. He was one of the first Polynesian artists to play at Tamworth.

Along with Uili Lafaele Junior who is a former Pesega College music teacher, Chookoon has set up a recording studio in Samoa to work with aspiring artists.

== Venues ==
He appeared at the Penrith Hotel on October 19, 2019. He appeared at the 2020 Tamworth Country Music Festival with his nine-piece band The Western Samoans which is made up of Samoan musicians.

He is to appear at the 2021 Tamworth Country Music Festival event as part of an International Showcase.

He appeared at the Tamworth festival in January 2023.

He was booked to play the 2023 Polyfest in Auckland New Zealand in March, 2023.
