= Matt Parish =

Australian rugby league coach

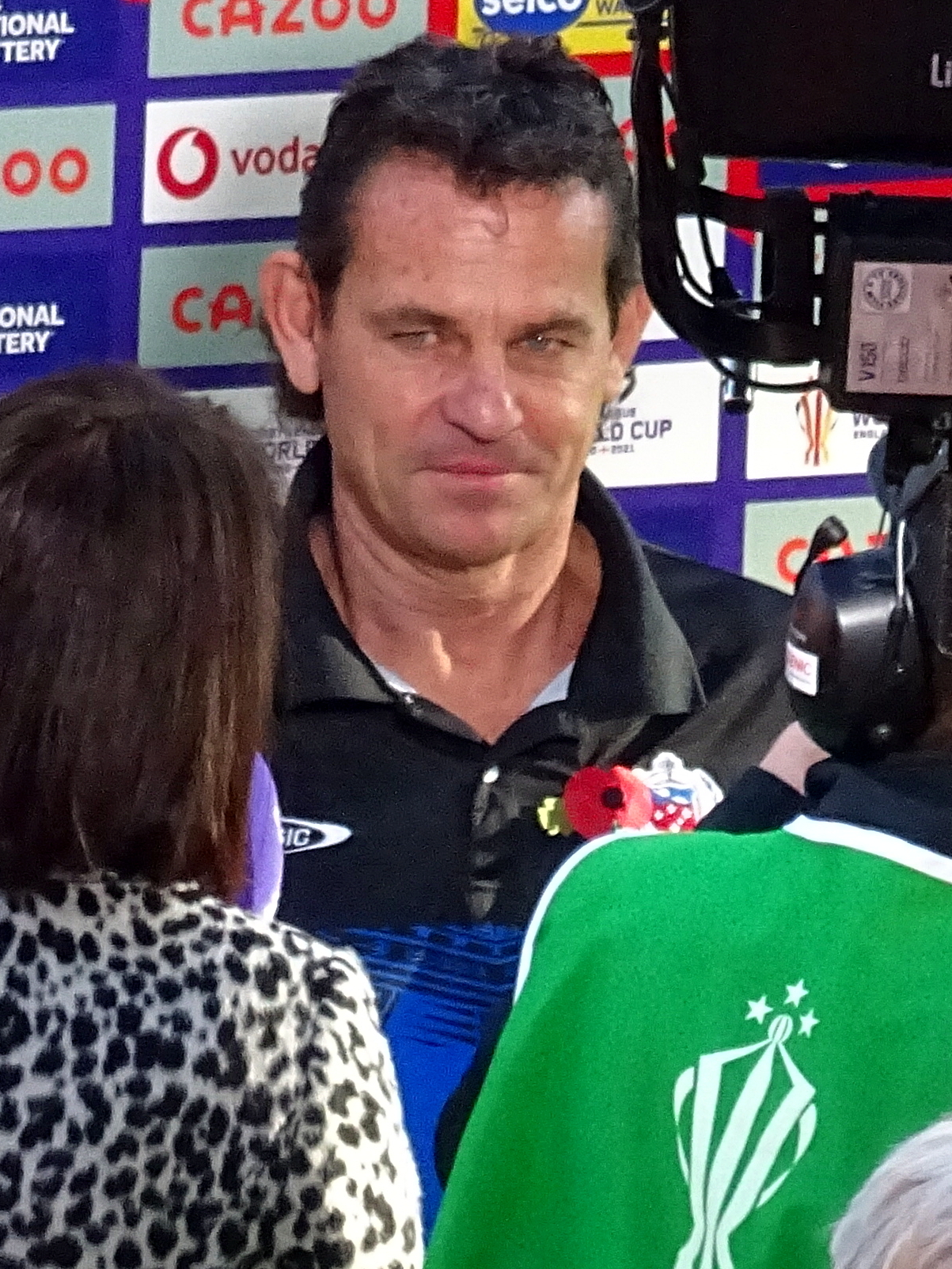

Personal information
- Full name: Matthew Parish

Playing information
- Position: Centre
Club
Years	Team	Pld	T	G	FG	P
1988–93	Balmain Tigers	55	6	0	0	24

Coaching information
Club
Years	Team	Gms	W	D	L	W%
2011	Salford City Reds	6	1	0	5	17
Representative
Years	Team	Gms	W	D	L	W%
2013–23	Samoa	26	11	1	14	42
- Source: As of 14 October 2022

Matt Parish is an Australian professional rugby league football coach who was the head coach of Samoa and a former professional rugby league footballer.

== Playing career ==
Parish played in 64 first-grade matches for the Balmain Tigers between 1988 and 1993.

== Coaching career ==
He moved into coaching, and served as assistant coach of the North Queensland Cowboys and the New South Wales State of Origin team.

In June 2011, Parish was appointed head coach of the Salford City Reds in the Super League, on a contract until the end of 2013. After taking charge in July, he coached the side for six matches, winning one, before resigning in November 2011. Parish cited "personal reasons" for leaving the club, though the Manchester Evening News reported that he had fallen out with the club's administration, having been critical of a number of aspects of the club's management. Shortly after leaving Salford, he returned to Australia and was appointed an assistant coach of the Manly-Warringah Sea Eagles, then the reigning National Rugby League premiers.

In 2013, Parish was appointed as head coach of Samoa.

He coached the Samoans to a quarter-final appearance in the 2013 Rugby League World Cup. Earlier in the tournament Samoa faced New Zealand. The Samoans were down 36–4 in the second half, until the Samoans gave 'the Kiwis' a scare scoring 20 consecutive points, getting to within 13 points of the lead with 15 minutes to go in the match. However, the 'Kiwis' scored one more try to seal the match. The Samoans won their next two games against the Kumuls and the French, to secure their spot in the quarterfinal where they took on Pacific rivals Fiji. They lost, 22–4, ending their World Cup campaign.

In October 2022, he named his Samoa squad for the 2021 Rugby League World Cup. Parish led the side to the World Cup Final where they were defeated by Australia. On 10 August 2023, he announced his resignation from the Samoan Head Coaching role.

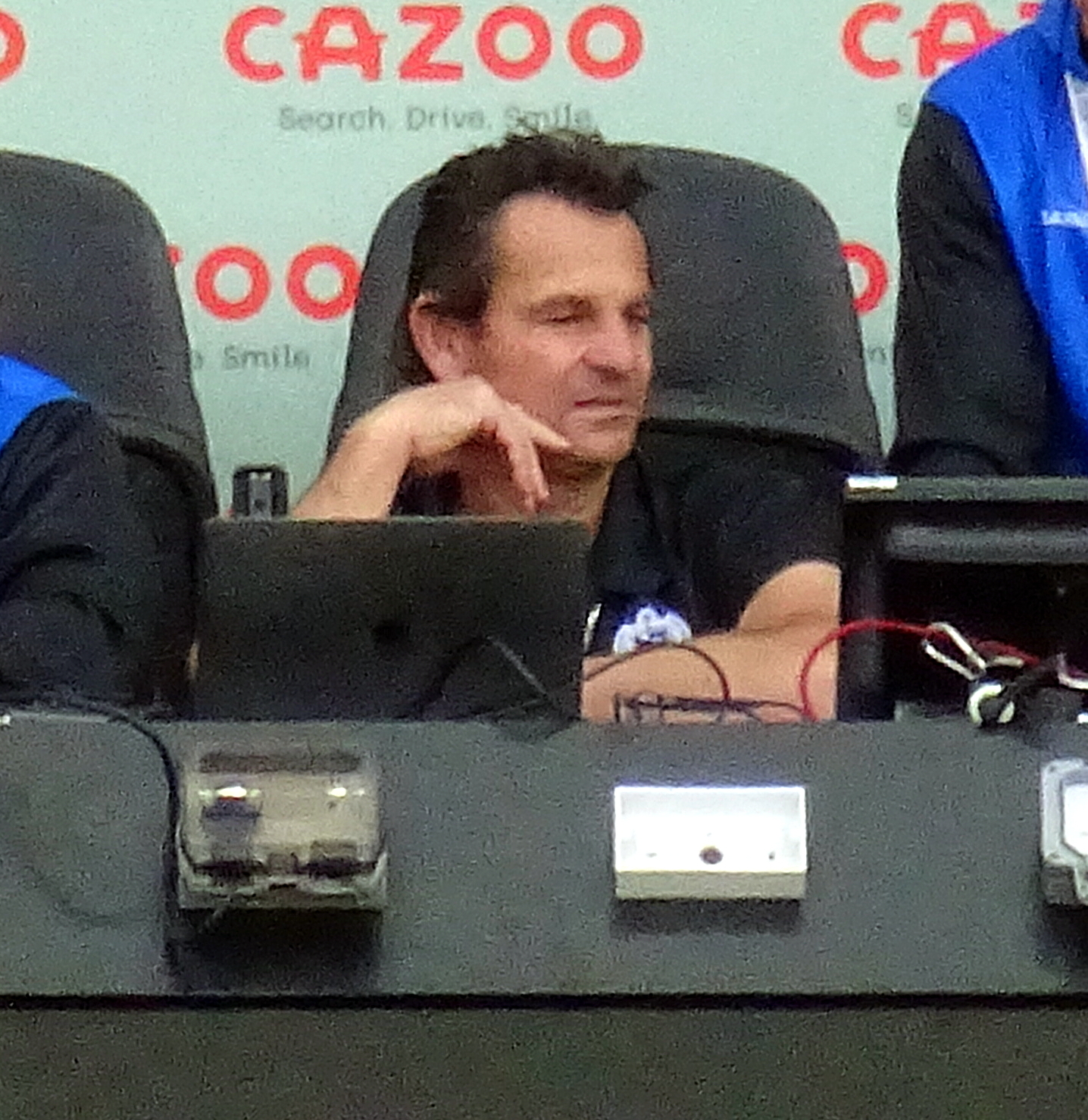
Parish coaching Samoa in 2022

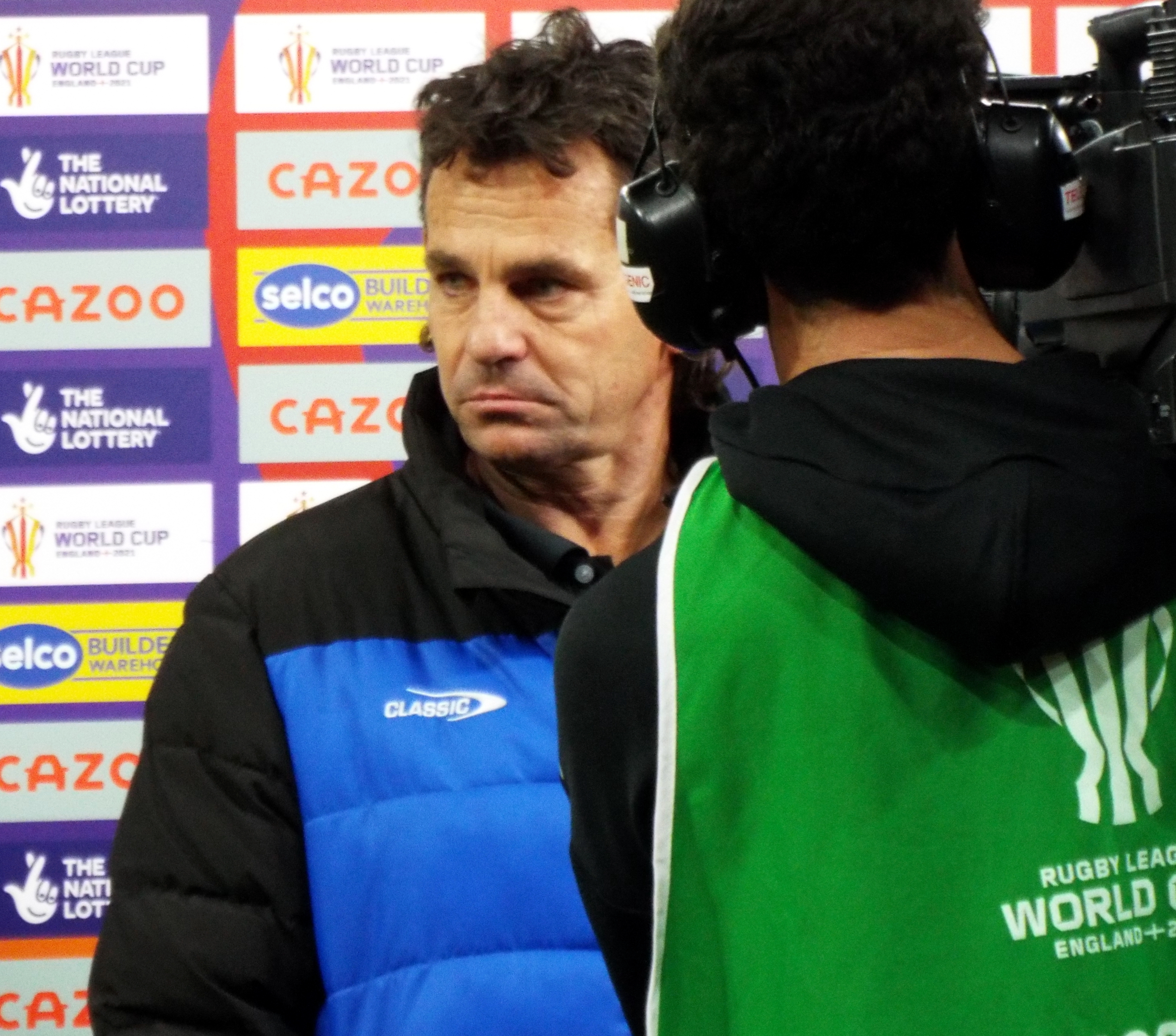
Parish post match interview after the 2021 RLWC Final

=== Samoa coaching record ===
Opponent	Played	Won	Drew	Lost	Win Ratio (%)
Australia	2	0	0	2	00.00
France	1	1	0	0	100.00
Fiji	3	1	0	2	33.33
England	3	1	0	2	33.33
New Zealand	3	0	0	3	00.00
Papua New Guinea	1	1	0	0	100.00
Scotland	1	0	1	0	00.00
Tonga	3	2	0	1	66.67
TOTAL	17	6	1	10	31.25

Four Nations record
Year	Round	Position	GP	W	L	D
Australia/New Zealand 2014	Fourth place	4/4	3	0	3	0
Total	0 Titles	0/1	3	0	3	0

World Cup record
Year	Round	Position	GP	W	L	D
England/Wales 2013	Quarter-Final	5/14	4	2	2	0
Australia/New Zealand/Papua New Guinea 2017	Quarter-Final	8/14	4	0	3	1
Total	0 Titles	0/2	8	2	5	1

== Personal life ==
In May 2014, it was revealed that Parish was dating Suzanne Hadley, estranged wife of Australian broadcaster Ray Hadley. The pair separated in April 2016. In February 2017, it was revealed that Suzanne Hadley had applied for an apprehended violence order against Parish. In April 2017, Parish agreed to abide to a six-month restraining order which includes not assaulting, threatening, harassing or intimidating Hadley. He also agreed not to contact her unless it is through a lawyer and not go near her home or place of work.
