= Kelvin Cummings =

- Born: Dunedin, New Zealand
- Genres: Country music
- Occupations: Singer, Songwriter, Musician, Actor, Model, Teacher, Amateur Disc Golfer
- Instruments: Singer, Guitar
- Spouse: Maree Cummings (m.1982)
- Awards: NZ Gold Guitar, Transtasman Entertainer of the Year
- Website: www.kelvincummings.com

Kelvin Cummings is a New Zealand singer, songwriter, musician, teacher and amateur disc golfer. He is known for his songs 'Blue Lake' and his cover of Nat King Cole's 'When I fall in Love', for winning NZ Golden Guitar Award in 2015, Transtasman Entertainer of the Year 2016, and for his 2009 appearance on Stars in Their Eyes.
