= M. H. Holcroft =

New Zealand essayist

Monte H. Holcroft
- Born: Montague Harry Holcroft; 14 May 1902; Rangiora, New Zealand
- Died: 24 September 1993 (aged 91); Rangiora, New Zealand
- Occupations: Writer, editor, and journalist
- Spouse(s): Eileen Allanah McLean, Aralia Jaslie Seldon Dale, Lorna Mildred Taylor
- Children: Allan (deceased), Anthony, Jocelyn

Montague Harry "Monte" Holcroft OBE (14 May 1902 – 24 September 1993) was a New Zealand essayist and novelist.

His 18½ years editing the New Zealand Listener "confirmed the Listener as a unique institution at the centre of New Zealand's cultural life".

== Early life and family ==
Holcroft was the second of three sons, born in Rangiora on 14 May 1902 to Harry Cooper Holcroft and Harriet Emily Soanes. He was married three times and had three children: Allan Holcroft (deceased) from his first marriage and Anthony Holcroft and Jocelyn Rimmington from his second marriage.

== Life ==
In 1936, Holcroft began writing for the Southland Times and became its editor. In 1949, Holcroft was offered the editorship of the New Zealand Listener in Wellington. He took up the appointment in June 1949. He became the longest-serving editor of the New Zealand Listener.

He helped found the New Zealand branch of UNESCO.

== Honours and awards ==
In 1947, Holcroft received the Hubert Church Award. In the 1970 New Year Honours, he was appointed an Officer of the Order of the British Empire, for services to journalism.

== Works ==
=== Novels ===
- Beyond the Breakers, John Long, 1928
- The Flameless Fire, John Long, 1931
- Brazilian Daughter John Long, 1931

=== Essays ===
- The village transformed: aspects of change in New Zealand, 1900-1990. Victoria University Press. 1990. ISBN 978-0-86473-210-1.
- A voice in the village: the Listener editorials of M.H. Holcroft. Silver Fern Books. 1989. ISBN 978-0-908792-04-7.
- New Zealand: Essay by M.H. Holcroft. Illustrators Kenneth Bigwood, Jean Bigwood. Reed. 1966.
- Encircling seas: an essay by M. H. Holcroft. The Caxton Press. 1946.
- The Deepening Stream: Cultural Influences in New Zealand (1940)

=== Memoir ===
- The way of a writer, Volume 1. Cape Catley. 1984. ISBN 978-0-908561-17-9.
- A sea of words: volume two of an autobiography. Cape Catley. 1986. ISBN 978-0-908561-15-5.

=== History ===
- The Line of the Road: A History of Manawatu County, 1876-1976. John McIndoe Ltd. 1977. OL 4380812M.

=== Anthology ===
- Discovered Isles: a Trilogy : The Deepening Stream, The Waiting Hills, Encircling Seas. Christchurch: Caxton Press, 1950. Voyager link
- Timeless World : a Collection of Essays, Wellington: Progressive Publishing Society, 1945. Voyager link NZ Listener 323.13 Aug (1945): 12-13.
