= Dusty Spittle =

New Zealand country singer and songwriter

- Birth name: Harold Ian Spittle
- Born: 3 March 1939; Gore, New Zealand
- Died: 8 December 2018 (aged 79); Dunstan Hospital, Clyde, New Zealand
- Occupations: Country singer, songwriter
- Years active: 1962–2018
- Labels: La Gloria Records, Viking Records, Music World

Harold Ian Spittle (3 March 1939 – 8 December 2018), better known by his stage name of Dusty Spittle, was a New Zealand country singer and songwriter.

== Early life ==
Spittle was born the eldest of four to Harold and Lesley Spittle in Gore, New Zealand, first attending school at the age of seven. As a boy he was in and out of hospital due to being born without a right ear or eardrum with one eventually being fashioned for him with the aid of a skin graph from his shoulder. In the late 1940s Spittle attended a Tex Morton show which helped inspire his passion for country music as well as a show performed by The Tumbleweeds. After attending Otago Boys' High School, Spittle travelled to Australia where he began his musical career in 1962.

== Career ==
Spittle initially performed as a duo alongside Ron Cavanagh called 'The Sunlanders', appearing live on Tasmanian radio stations. It was during this time Spittle changed his stage name from Ian Spittle to Dusty Miller, due to his mother's fondness for the plant, and also wrote his first song, a poem penned by Violet Swan called 'Shake Hands with your Brother Again' which he was asked to put music to. Spittle later returned to Gore where he changed his stage name to Dusty Spittle and joined friend Max McCauley in his band The Mountaineers. It was with this group that Spittle had his first recording session as well as his first appearance singing on a record with his impromptu recording of 'The Fool's Paradise' during studio down time appearing as track two on the groups 1966 album 'I Was Born To Yodel'. The following year Spittle released his own album backed by The Mountaineers titled 'Cardigan Bay And Other Cowboy Songs' which included six songs written by himself with the title track 'Cardigan Bay' becoming one of Spittle's most popular songs, written about the successful harness racer of the same name. Spittle made two additional albums in New Zealand before returning to Australia where he toured alongside Buddy Williams and Rick and Thel Carey with Williams recording several songs penned by Spittle. While in Australia, Spittle became heavily involved with Tamworth Country Music Festival.

== Personal life and death ==
In 1992, Spittle was operated on to remove a cyst from his brain which resulted in paralysis of the right side of his face as well as memory loss which he took over a decade to recover fully from. A month prior to his death, Spittle suffered a stroke and was put in care at Clyde's Dunstan Hospital. During this time, he fell from his bed, breaking his hip, which resulted in surgery. He died at Clyde on 8 December 2018 from pneumonia.

== Partial discography ==
=== Studio albums ===
- Cardigan Bay And Other Cowboy Songs (La Gloria Records, 1967)
- Songs For Country Folks (Viking, 1967)
- Country Boy's Dream (Viking, 1970)
- The Kingston Flyer & other country favourites (Wells Fargo, 1974)
- The Country World of Dusty Spittle (Viking, 1979)
- Kiwi Storyteller Songs Of New Zealand' Country Heritage (Music World, 1982)
- Rodeo Ballads And Sad Country Songs (Kiwi Pacific Records Ltd, 1990)
- Rose and crystal (Kiwi Pacific Records Ltd, 1993)
- What Would I Be Without You (recorded at Sweetway Studios, 2008)
- Dusty Country (2011)
