= 1970 New Year Honours (New Zealand) =

Annual awards for New Zealanders

The 1970 New Year Honours in New Zealand were appointments by Elizabeth II on the advice of the New Zealand government to various orders and honours to reward and highlight good works by New Zealanders. The awards celebrated the passing of 1969 and the beginning of 1970, and were announced on 1 January 1970.

The recipients of honours are displayed here as they were styled before their new honour.

== Knight Bachelor ==
- James Nimmo Crawford Doig. For outstanding services to commerce and exporting industries.
- The Honourable Mr Justice Trevor Ernest Henry – senior puisne judge, Supreme Court.

== Order of Saint Michael and Saint George ==
=== Companion (CMG) ===
- Percy Lyndon Laing, lately Commissioner of Works.
- John Seabrook AFC ED JP – of Auckland. For valuable services to the community and to commerce.

== Order of the British Empire ==
=== Dame Commander (DBE) ===
Civil division

- Te Ata-i-Rangikaahu Ariki nui – of Huntly. For outstanding services to the Māori people.
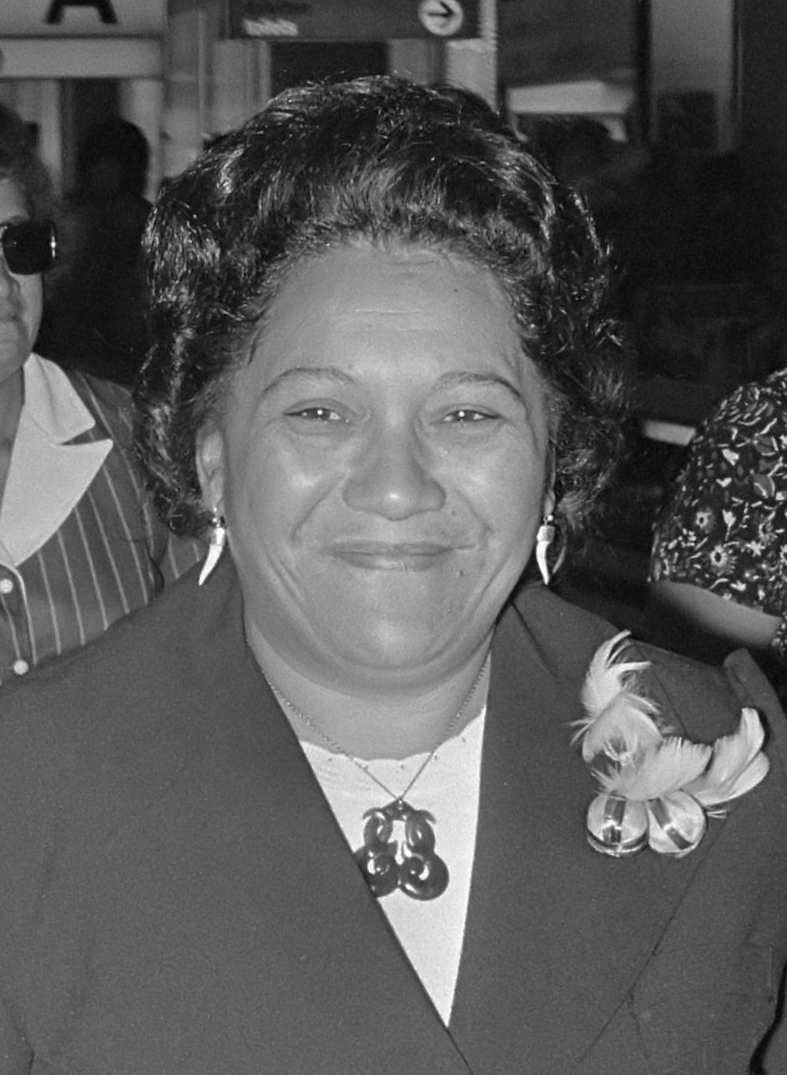
Dame Te Atairangikaahu

=== Commander (CBE) ===
Civil division

- Harry Edgar Duff Daysh JP – of Wellington. For very valuable services to commerce and the community.
- Robertson Huntly Stewart – of Christchurch. For very valuable services to the manufacturing industry.
- Bryan Shuckburgh Trolove JP – of Kaikōura. For very valuable services to sheep farming, especially as a member of the New Zealand Wool Board.
- Noel Spencer Woods – Secretary of Labour.

Military division

- Brigadier Robertson McKay Paterson DSO – Brigadiers' List (Regular Force).

=== Officer (OBE) ===
Civil division

- Frank Maine Bateson – of Tauranga. For valuable services to science in the field of astronomy.
- Arthur Ernest Bockett – of Wellington. For valuable services to the waterfront industry.
- Gordon Alison Guy Connal – of Christchurch. For valuable services to local bodies and the arts.
- John Joseph Enwright MB ChB – of Auckland. For valuable services at the Qui Nhơn Hospital in Vietnam over the past five years.
- John Hannibal George JP MP – of Roxburgh. For valuable services to politics.
- Ronald Victor Giorgi JP – of Hastings. For valuable services to the community, particularly in local-body affairs.
- Thomas Hill – of Dunedin. For valuable services to education.
- Montague Harry Holcroft – of Paekākāriki. For valuable services to journalism.
- Noel Jones JP – of Nelson. For valuable services to the community.
- Peter McIntyre – of Wellington. For valuable services to the arts.
- Jocelyn Maud Ryburn – of Dunedin. For valuable services to the Plunket Society of New Zealand.
- James Alexander Stenberg – of Auckland. For valuable services to the community and to the arts.
- Joseph Listen Wilson JP – of Auckland. For valuable services to the Navy League.

Military division

- Commander (Special Branch) William Ephraim Voysey Lowe – Royal New Zealand Navy.
- Lieutenant-Colonel Howard Spencer Cocks – Royal Regiment of New Zealand Artillery (Regular Force).
- Wing Commander Gordon Ernest Erridge – Royal New Zealand Air Force.
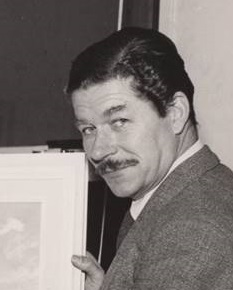
Peter McIntyre

=== Member (MBE) ===
Civil division

- Frank Auld – of Whangārei. For services to the community.
- James Watson Birnie – of Taupō. For services to the community and to local bodies.
- Christopher Bernard Bouzaid – of Auckland. For services in the field of yachting.
- Nancy Vivian Jessie Claridge – of Upper Hutt. For services to the YWCA movement of New Zealand.
- Arthur Thomas Cushen – of Invercargill. For services to the community as a radio journalist, and to the blind people of Invercargill.
- Douglas Scott Dodds – of Christchurch. For services in the field of pharmacy.
- James Stewart Douglas – resident engineer, Ministry of Works, Westport.
- Edna Mary Fairhall – of Marlborough. For services to the community.
- Frederick William Finer – of Hāwera. For services to local bodies.
- Marie Lilian Griffin – of Auckland. For services in the field of marriage and family guidance.
- John Sidney Hickey JP – of Ōpunake. For services to local bodies and the dairying industry.
- Jean Caroline Lodge – of Rotorua. For services to the community and in the field of sport, especially basketball.
- Arthur Baird Martin – of Martinborough. For services to local bodies and to the community.
- Geoffrey Grey Muir – of Gisborne. For services to journalism and the newspaper industry.
- John Craig Pollock JP – of Hamilton. For services to the community.
- Charles Holmwood Sturton – of Tauranga. For services to the New Zealand Police.
- Turi Rangi Te Kani JP – of Tauranga. For services to the Māori people.
- Howard Charles James Thompson – of Wellington; formerly assistant Secretary of Labour.
- William Goddard Volckman MB ChB – of Canterbury. For services to the community as a general practitioner.
- Olwen Frances Watson – of Napier. For services to the nursing profession.

Military division

- Lieutenant (Special Duties) Thomas Martin Morrow – Royal New Zealand Navy.
- Major Maurice John Blair – Royal New Zealand Infantry Regiment (Territorial Force).
- Major Eric Vernon Braggins – Royal New Zealand Infantry Regiment (Regular Force).
- Captain Joan May Burn – New Zealand Women's Royal Army Corps (Regular Force).
- Chaplain Class III Whakahuihui Vercoe – Royal New Zealand Chaplains Department (Regular Force).
- Warrant Officer First Class Barry Roy Veysey – Royal New Zealand Infantry Regiment (Regular Force).
- Warrant Officer William Robinson – Royal New Zealand Air Force.

== Companion of the Imperial Service Order (ISO) ==
- David Kennedy – lately Conservator of Forests, New Zealand Forest Service, Rotorua.

== British Empire Medal (BEM) ==
Civil division

- Andrew Joseph Francis Brown – of Dunedin. For services to the community as an entertainment promoter.
- Nellie Scott Climie – of Paeroa. For services to education, the community and in the historical field.
- Frederick James Cullen – of Nelson. For services to the community, especially as a visitor to mental hospitals.
- Henry Leslie Emerson JP – of Tauranga. For services in a first aid capacity on hydroelectric schemes on the Waikato River.
- Zena Bell Gay – of Nelson. For services to the community, especially in the field of indoor basketball.
- Isobel May Hollis – of Wellington. For services as a police matron and as a probation officer.
- Gwyneth Olwyn Jepson – of Auckland. For services to returned servicemen and women and their dependants.
- Eric Alfred Johnson – of Marlborough Sounds. For services to the community.
- Murray Albert Le Fevre – constable, New Zealand Police Force, Reefton.
- Bruce Graham Mackenzie – constable, New Zealand Police Force, Eketāhuna.
- Edna Frances Neville – of Christchurch. For services to the community as an entertainer.
- Eric Priar Nisbet – of Rotorua. For services as a sporting coach, especially swimming.
- James Coull Stirling. For services as supervisor of government grounds, Wellington.
- Bernice Muriel Wells – of Auckland. For services as a lip-reading teacher with the New Zealand League for the Hard of Hearing.
- Mary Elizabeth Will – of Palmerston North. For community services, especially to Country Women's Institutes.

Military division

- Medical Petty Officer Cecil Cameron – Royal New Zealand Navy.
- Petty Officer Ronald Duncan Robinson – Royal New Zealand Navy.
- Chief Visual Instructor Arthur Charles Venus – Royal New Zealand Navy.
- Sergeant Frederick Bigg-Wither – Royal Regiment of New Zealand Artillery (Regular Force).
- Sergeant Thomas Riri – Royal New Zealand Infantry Regiment (Regular Force).
- Flight Sergeant Francis Harold Hodgson – Royal New Zealand Air Force.

== Air Force Cross (AFC) ==
- Flight Lieutenant (Temporary Squadron Leader) Larry Alexander Olsen – Royal New Zealand Air Force.

== Queen's Fire Services Medal (QFSM) ==
- Howard Leonard Hooker – deputy chief fire officer, Cambridge Volunteer Fire Brigade.
- Hector Vincent Sylvester Oliver – chief fire officer, Nelson Fire Brigade.

== Queen's Police Medal (QPM) ==
- Bruce Harry Constable – detective sergeant, New Zealand Police Force.
- Cyril Leonard Scanlan – superintendent, New Zealand Police Force.

== Queen's Commendation for Valuable Service in the Air ==
- Flight Lieutenant William John Ramsay – Royal New Zealand Air Force.
