= 2010 Invercargill mayoral election =

2010 mayoral election in Invercargill, New Zealand

- 9 October 2010
- Turnout: 22,255
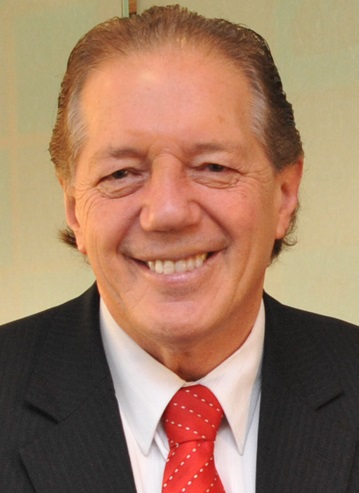

Candidate	Tim Shadbolt	Suzanne Prentice
Party	Independent	Independent
Popular vote	16,275	5,311
Percentage	73.13	23.86
Mayor before election
Tim Shadbolt
Elected mayor
Tim Shadbolt

The 2010 Invercargill mayoral election finished on Saturday, 9 October 2010 and was conducted under the First Past the Post system using the postal voting system. It was held as part of the 2010 New Zealand local elections.

== Background ==
The candidates for mayor included the incumbent Tim Shadbolt who contested a sixth consecutive term. Other candidates included Suzanne Prentice and Carl Heenan. Prentice decided to run after Shadbolt had offered her the position of deputy mayor in December 2009. Tim Shadbolt won the mayoral election and won a sixth term as Mayor of Invercargill, making him one of the longest-serving mayors in New Zealand.

== Results ==
The following table gives the election results:

2010 Invercargill mayoral election
Party	Candidate	Votes	%	±%
Independent	Tim Shadbolt	16,275	73.13	−10.04
Independent	Suzanne Prentice	5,311	23.86	
Independent	Carl Heenan	669	3.01	
Majority		10,964	49.26	−17.09
Turnout		22,255		
