= Stars in Their Eyes (New Zealand TV series) =

- Genre: Talent Show
- Created by: Joop van den Ende
- Written by: Paul Ego
- Presented by: Simon Barnett
- Narrated by: Grant Walker
- Country of origin: New Zealand
- Original language: English
- No. of seasons: 2
- No. of episodes: 20

Production
- Running time: 60 minutes (including advertisements)

Original release
- Network: TVNZ (TV One)
- Release: 22 April 2008 – 23 June 2009

Stars in Their Eyes is a TVNZ talent show, based on Dutch talent show Soundmixshow. It was hosted by Simon Barnett.

== 2008 season ==
The finalists were:

| Episode | Name of contestant | Appeared on the show as... |
|---|---|---|
| 1 (22 April) | Caroline Lekstrom | Shakira |
| 2 (29 April) | Lili Latham | Debbie Harry |
| 3 (6 May) | Brendon Chase | Elvis Presley |
| 4 (13 May) | Deryn Trainer | Billy Joel |
| 5 (20 May) | Ellen Kuiper | Anastacia |
| 6 (27 May) | Emmeline Pitcher | Cher |
| 7 (3 June) | Paul Madsen | George Michael |
| 8 (10 June) | Cindy Filo | Tina Turner |
| 9 (17 June) | Tony Wellington | Roy Orbison |
| Grand Final (24 June) | Deryn Trainer | Billy Joel |

=== Episode 1 (22 April 2008) ===
| Contestant | Appeared on the show as... | Performing the song... |
|---|---|---|
| Andy Gilmour | Meat Loaf | You Took the Words Right Out of My Mouth |
| Caroline Lekstrom | Shakira | Whenever, Wherever |
| David Sutton | Robbie Williams | Angels |
| Karen Davy | Dolly Parton | Here You Come Again |
| Steve Larkins | Freddie Mercury | Bohemian Rhapsody |

=== Episode 2 (29 April 2008) ===
| Contestant | Appeared on the show as... | Performing the song... |
|---|---|---|
| Emilie Harwood | Celine Dion | My Heart Will Go On |
| Jason Tapp | Johnny Cash | Ring of Fire |
| Lili Latham | Debbie Harry | One Way or Another |
| Peter Morgan | Stevie Wonder | Superstition |
| Vince Gambino | Tom Jones | Delilah |

=== Episode 3 (6 May 2008) ===
| Contestant | Appeared on the show as... | Performing the song... |
|---|---|---|
| Brendon Chase | Elvis Presley | Suspicious Minds |
| Mani Fagundes | Lenny Kravitz | Fly Away |
| Pete Madsen | Barry Gibb | Night Fever |
| Renee Petersen | Amy Lee | Call Me When You're Sober |
| Sarah Hannaford-Hill | Madonna | Don't Tell Me |

=== Episode 4 (13 May 2008) ===
| Contestant | Appeared on the show as... | Performing the song... |
|---|---|---|
| Deryn Trainer | Billy Joel | Piano Man |
| Lisa Jimmieson | Christine McVie | You Make Loving Fun |
| Mitch Golner | Neil Young | Heart of Gold |
| Sarah McBride | Kylie Minogue | Can't Get You Out of My Head |
| Vanessa Abernethy | Melissa Etheridge | Like the Way I Do |

=== Episode 5 (20 May 2008) ===
| Contestant | Appeared on the show as... | Performing the song... |
|---|---|---|
| Brett Wallace | Neil Diamond | Sweet Caroline |
| Ellen Kuiper | Anastacia | I'm Outta Love |
| Gordon Fletcher | Don Henley | Hotel California |
| Jason Carlo | Ronan Keating | If Tomorrow Never Comes |
| Shaan Antunovich | Shania Twain | Man! I Feel Like A Woman! |

=== Episode 6 (27 May 2008) ===
| Contestant | Appeared on the show as... | Performing the song... |
|---|---|---|
| Anna Hawkins | Sarah Brightman | Memory |
| Catherine Short | Lulu | To Sir, With Love |
| Emmeline Pitcher | Cher | If I Could Turn Back Time |
| Malcolm McCallum | James Taylor | Fire and Rain |
| Tami Nelson | Amy Winehouse | Rehab |

=== Episode 7 (3 June 2008) ===
| Contestant | Appeared on the show as... | Performing the song... |
|---|---|---|
| Jared Cuff | Engelbert Humperdinck | There Goes My Everything |
| Paul Madsen | George Michael | Faith |
| Pauline Berry | Marilyn Monroe | Diamonds Are a Girl's Best Friend |
| Sara Jane Elika | Beyoncé Knowles | Crazy in Love |
| Truda Chadwick | Chrissie Hynde | Back on the Chain Gang |

=== Episode 8 (10 June 2008) ===
| Contestant | Appeared on the show as... | Performing the song... |
|---|---|---|
| Amy Altman | Alicia Keys | If I Ain't Got You |
| Cindy Filo | Tina Turner | Proud Mary |
| Maz Pheby | Fergie | Big Girls Don't Cry |
| Michelle Hopkirk | Bonnie Tyler | It's a Heartache |
| Richard Gregory | Paul McCartney | Silly Love Songs |

=== Episode 9 (17 June 2008) ===
| Contestant | Appeared on the show as... | Performing the song... |
|---|---|---|
| Eddie Simon | Leo Sayer | You Make Me Feel Like Dancing |
| Gillian Forbes | Alanis Morissette | Ironic |
| Greg Ward | Elton John | I'm Still Standing |
| Mareya Watling | Dido | Thank You |
| Tony Wellington | Roy Orbison | Oh, Pretty Woman |

== 2009 season ==
The finalists were:

| Episode | Name of contestant | Appeared on the show as... |
|---|---|---|
| 1 (28 April) | Mike Henderson | Scott Stapp |
| 2 (5 May) | Lisa Crawley | Norah Jones |
| 3 (12 May) | Nigel McCutcheon | Billy Idol |
| 4 (19 May) | Chris Mears | Boy George |
| 5 (26 May) | Dan Kendrick | David Lee Roth |
| 6 (2 June) | Thomas Stowers | Barry White |
| 7 (9 June) | Mandy Pickering | Sarah McLachlan |
| 8 (16 June) | Mark Jensen | Bobby Darin |
| 9 (23 June) | Jessie Matthews | Aretha Franklin |
| Grand Final (30 June) | Mandy Pickering | Sarah McLachlan |

=== Episode 1 (28 April 2009) ===
| Contestant | Appeared on the show as... | Performing the song... |
|---|---|---|
| Eliza Mackle | Pat Benatar | Hit Me with Your Best Shot |
| Colin Jones | Joe Cocker | Unchain My Heart |
| Courtney Janssen | Miley Cyrus | See You Again |
| Mike Henderson | Scott Stapp | With Arms Wide Open |
| Kelvin Cummings | Jerry Lee Lewis | Great Balls of Fire |

=== Episode 2 (5 May 2009) ===
| Contestant | Appeared on the show as... | Performing the song... |
|---|---|---|
| Dave Woods | Rod Stewart | Maggie May |
| Lisa Crawley | Norah Jones | Don't Know Why |
| Jordan Davison | Robert Plant | Black Dog |
| Karen DeGraaf | Bonnie Raitt | Something to Talk About |
| Jon Palmer | Gene Pitney | 24 Hours from Tulsa |

=== Episode 3 (12 May 2009) ===
| Contestant | Appeared on the show as... | Performing the song... |
|---|---|---|
| Brandt McRichie | Tom Jones | If I Only Knew |
| Clarinda Kwee | Bic Runga | Sway |
| Marc Hamilton | Rob Thomas | How Far We've Come |
| Nigel McCutcheon | Billy Idol | Rebel Yell |
| Rachael Tolhopf | Gwen Stefani | Just a Girl |

=== Episode 4 (19 May 2009) ===
| Contestant | Appeared on the show as... | Performing the song... |
|---|---|---|
| Chris Mears | Boy George | Karma Chameleon |
| James Crosby | Gary Lightbody | Chasing Cars |
| Marcia Middlemiss | Karen Carpenter | Top of the World |
| Lou Rix | Grace Jones | Pull Up to the Bumper |
| Johnny Angel | Tony Orlando | Knock Three Times |

=== Episode 5 (26 May 2009) ===
| Contestant | Appeared on the show as... | Performing the song... |
|---|---|---|
| Corin Haines | Phil Collins | Against All Odds |
| Sharon Cunningham | Diana Ross | Chain Reaction |
| Deb Jardin | Brooke Fraser | Shadowfeet |
| Dan Kendrick | David Lee Roth | Jump |
| Talia Cameron | Britney Spears | Toxic |

=== Episode 6 (2 June 2009) ===
| Contestant | Appeared on the show as... | Performing the song... |
|---|---|---|
| Thomas Stowers | Barry White | Can't Get Enough of Your Love, Babe |
| Vicki Eaton | Alicia Keys | No One |
| Sarah Lina | Nicole Scherzinger | Don't Cha |
| Richard Hanna | Dean Martin | That's Amore |
| Kylie Garus | Stevie Nicks | Dreams |

=== Episode 7 (9 June 2009) ===
| Contestant | Appeared on the show as... | Performing the song... |
|---|---|---|
| Richard Leith | Buddy Holly | Peggy Sue |
| Mandy Pickering | Sarah McLachlan | Angel |
| Kathy Phillips | Whitney Houston | I Wanna Dance with Somebody |
| Megan Kane | Avril Lavigne | Sk8er Boi |
| Steve Hamlin | Steve Earle | Copperhead Road |

=== Episode 8 (16 June 2009) ===
| Contestant | Appeared on the show as... | Performing the song... |
|---|---|---|
| Nieka Matekino | Tina Turner | Nutbush City Limits |
| George Smith | Cat Stevens | Father and Son |
| Danny Cottrell | Billy Gibbons | Sharp Dressed Man |
| Mark Jensen | Bobby Darin | Beyond the Sea |
| Katherine Tuent | Vanessa Carlton | A Thousand Miles |

=== Episode 9 (23 June 2009) ===
| Contestant | Appeared on the show as... | Performing the song... |
|---|---|---|
| Jessie Matthews | Aretha Franklin | Think |
| John Schaeffer | Jon Bon Jovi | Wanted Dead Or Alive |
| Carleen Murphy | Jennifer Lopez | If You Had My Love |
| Scott Topham | Garth Brooks | The Thunder Rolls |
| Odette Meares | Judith Durham | Georgy Girl |

== Reception ==
Taranaki Daily News television critic Gordon Brown wrote, "Unusually, Mrs Brown and I agreed on several key findings. We both thought Simon was an excellent host. We both thought that generally the singers were somewhat less than excellent and, most significantly, we felt the wrong person won." The New Zealand Herald criticised the show, stating, "Aside from the cheap set, the naff format, the wince-making band, the unconvincing impersonations, the boring songs, there's nothing much else wrong - except Barnett. He needs to broaden his vocab, which ranges from the afore-mentioned brilliant to stunning, legendary, unreal, unbelievable. Those words do not match the reality."

In a negative review, Nick Ward of The Nelson Mail said, "Perhaps naively, I keep expecting this show to unearth a few potential Susan Boyles - ordinary Kiwis who've had a good night or two at karaoke and let their friends and workmates talk them into going on TV. Instead, a parade of professional and semi-professional musicians belt out their favourites after a quick dash through TVNZ's makeup department. ... Host Simon Barnett's gushingly positive assessments ('Stunning!', 'Extraordinary!', 'You took me back to my form two social!') are as unconvincing as his arguments in favour of the divinely-sanctioned clouting of children."

== Link ==
Official Website
