= Joe Brown (impresario) =

New Zwaland impresario (1907–1986)

Joe Brown BEM
- Born: Andrew Joseph Francis Brown; 3 October 1907; Naseby, New Zealand
- Died: 23 August 1986 (aged 78); Mosgiel, New Zealand
- Occupations: Mechanic; entrepreneur; entertainment promoter; businessman; racehorse owner
- Known for: Entertainment promotion in New Zealand

Andrew Joseph Francis Brown BEM (3 October 1907 – 23 August 1986) was a New Zealand mechanic, entrepreneur, entertainment promoter, businessman and racehorse owner. He was born in Naseby, in the Maniototo, New Zealand, on 3 October 1907.

In the 1970 New Year Honours, Brown was awarded the British Empire Medal for services to the community as an entertainment promoter.
