= David Campbell (Australian politician) =

Australian state politician (born 1957)

The Honourable David Campbell

Minister for Transport
- In office 8 September 2008 – 21 May 2010
- Premier: Nathan Rees; Kristina Keneally
- Governor: Marie Bashir
- Preceded by: John Watkins
- Succeeded by: John Robertson

Minister for Roads
- In office 8 December 2009 – 21 May 2010
- Premier: Kristina Keneally
- Governor: Marie Bashir
- Preceded by: Michael Daley
- Succeeded by: David Borger

Minister for the Illawarra
- In office 11 September 2008 – 4 December 2009
- Premier: Nathan Rees
- Preceded by: Matt Brown
- Succeeded by: Paul McLeay
- In office 2 April 2003 – 5 September 2008
- Premier: Bob Carr; Morris Iemma
- Governor: Marie Bashir
- Preceded by: New title
- Succeeded by: Matt Brown

Minister for Police
- In office 2 April 2007 – 5 September 2008
- Premier: Morris Iemma
- Preceded by: John Watkins
- Succeeded by: Matt Brown

Member of the New South Wales Parliament for Keira
- In office 27 March 1999 – 26 March 2011
- Preceded by: Col Markham
- Succeeded by: Ryan Park

Personal details
- Born: David Andrew Campbell; 27 July 1957 (age 69) Bulli, New South Wales, Australia
- Party: Labor Party
- Spouse: Edna Campbell
- Children: 2 sons

David Andrew Campbell (born 27 July 1957) is an Australian former politician who was member of the New South Wales Legislative Assembly for Keira between 1999 and 2011. A former Lord Mayor of Wollongong, Campbell was appointed Minister for Police from 2 April 2007 to 5 September 2008, as well as Minister for Transport from 8 September 2008 until his resignation on 20 May 2010, with both positions as part of the NSW Government. On 28 September 2010, Campbell announced that he would not seek Labor endorsement for re-election at the 2011 NSW election.

== Background and early years ==
Campbell was born in Bulli, New South Wales the son of Margaret and Harry Campbell. In 1974, Campbell married Edna and together they have two adult sons.

Campbell joined the Labor Party in the mid-1970s. He was an alderman on the Council of the City of Wollongong from 1987 to 1999 and Lord Mayor from September 1991 to 1999. He was appointed a Fellow of the University of Wollongong in 1995.

== State politics ==
Campbell was elected as Member for Keira in March 1999 representing the Labor Party following a decision by Col Markham to contest the seat of Wollongong. Campbell was re-elected as Member for Keira at the 2003 and 2007 elections.

In 2003, Campbell was appointed Minister for Regional Development, Minister for the Illawarra, and Minister for Small Business by Premier Bob Carr, and Minister for Water Utilities in February 2006 by Premier Morris Iemma. Following the 2007 election, Iemma appointed Campbell to the role of Police Minister and Minister for Illawarra. Premier Nathan Rees promoted Campbell as Minister for Transport on 8 September 2008, which was expanded to include Roads under Premier Kristina Keneally in December 2009.

For most of 2009, Minister Campbell was dogged by the controversial Metro project, a Metro style rail proposal for the Sydney CBD and Inner West. Originally expected to cost $2 billion, the CBD Metro was later estimated to cost $7 billion and caused Campbell to come under pressure from the public over the continued viability of the project. The Sydney Metro was cancelled in February 2010. Campbell was labelled 'Mr Slow' by the NSW opposition and The Daily Telegraph for his handling of transport issues.

=== Resignation ===
On 20 May 2010, Seven News broadcast video surveillance revealing Campbell leaving a gay sex club in Kensington. Shortly before the footage was aired, Campbell resigned as minister for Transport and Roads citing personal reasons and said that he would remain as the Member for Keira.

The journalist who broke the story, Adam Walters, defended airing the footage, saying it was in the "public interest". Walters was supported by former Labor Premier Barrie Unsworth, who described Campbell's actions as "deplorable." Unsworth told The Australian newspaper "Campbell has been the police minister and he's been on the NSW Crime Commission, and he's frequented places where he's easily recognised. The threat is not from Channel 7 lurking outside but by the people inside. We've got a criminal milieu in this city and he laid himself open to all sorts of threats and blackmail." Another former Labor Premier Bob Carr defended Campbell. "My position has always been that the private life of MPs is precisely that," Carr said. Others, including the former High Court justice Michael Kirby, criticised Walters and Seven, with Kirby describing Seven News as "serial homophobes" for their coverage of the story.

On 28 September 2010, Campbell announced that he would not seek Labor Party endorsement, nor re-election, for the seat of Keira at the 2011 general election. It was reported that Campbell claimed he had strong support from the Labor Party and was confident he would have been endorsed for his seat should he have decided to contest the election. Campbell retired after serving 24 years as an elected representative in local and state politics.

New South Wales Legislative Assembly
Preceded by Col Markham	Member for Keira; 1999–2011	Succeeded by Ryan Park
