= Ryan Park (politician) =

Australian politician

The Honourable Ryan Park MP
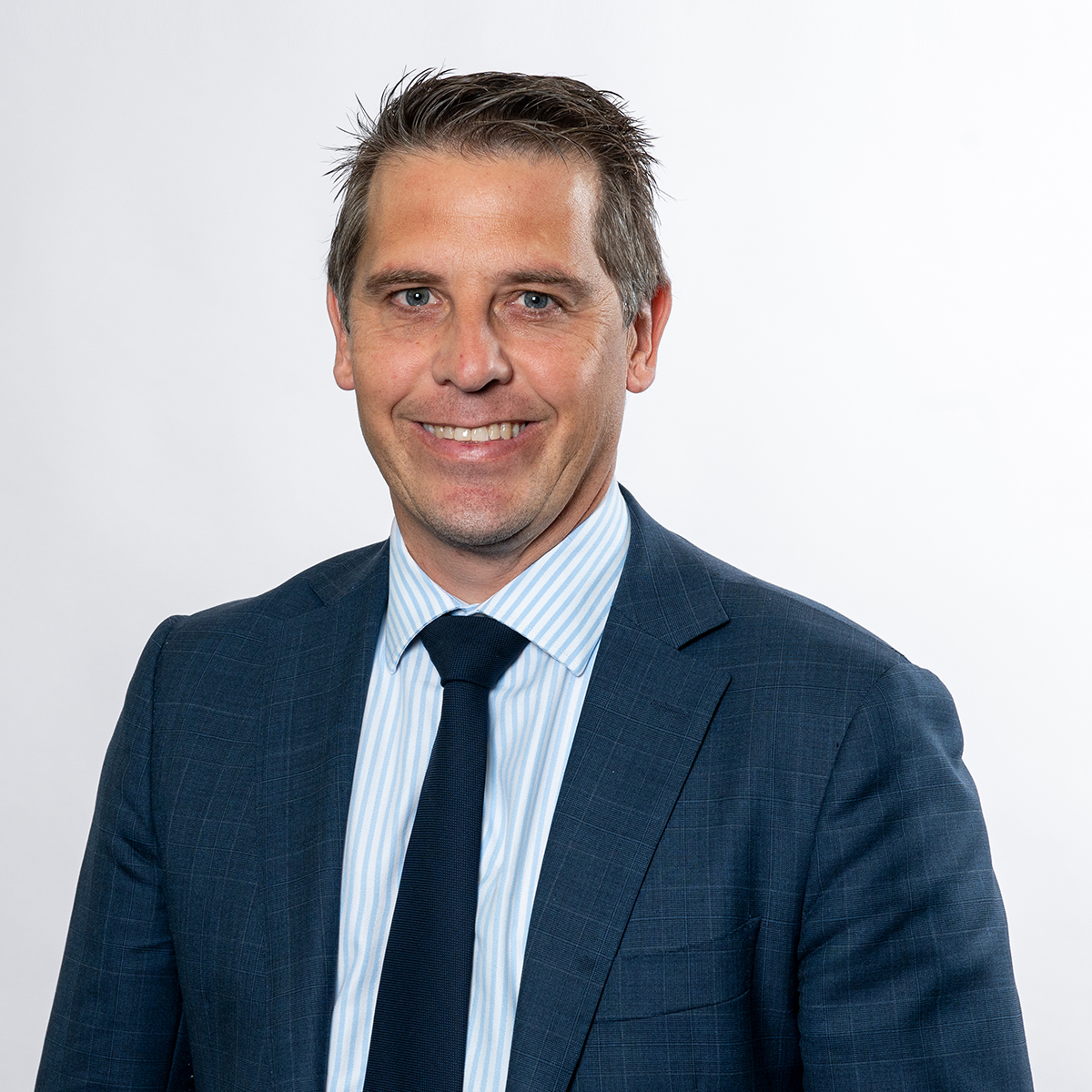

Minister for Health
- Incumbent
- Assumed office 28 March 2023
- Premier: Chris Minns
- Preceded by: Brad Hazzard

Minister for Regional Health
- Incumbent
- Assumed office 28 March 2023
- Premier: Chris Minns
- Preceded by: Bronnie Taylor

Minister for Mental Health
- In office 28 March 2023 – 5 April 2023
- Premier: Chris Minns
- Preceded by: Bronnie Taylor
- Succeeded by: Rose Jackson

Minister for the Illawarra and South Coast
- Incumbent
- Assumed office 28 March 2023
- Premier: Chris Minns
- Preceded by: John Ajaka (2014–2015)

Member of the New South Wales Legislative Assembly for Keira
- Incumbent
- Assumed office 26 March 2011
- Preceded by: David Campbell

Personal details
- Born: Ryan John Park; 1977 (age 48–49) Wollongong, NSW, Australia
- Party: Labor Party
- Occupation: Teacher, chief of staff
- Website: www.ryanpark.com.au

Ryan John Park (born 1977) is an Australian politician. He has been a Labor Party member of the New South Wales Legislative Assembly since March 2011, representing the electorate of Keira. He is the current Minister for Health. He previously served as the NSW Shadow Minister for Health since 2019, and the Shadow Minister for the Illawarra since 2013. He is the third most senior Labor MP in the NSW Legislative Assembly.

== Early life ==
Park was born in Wollongong and attended local state schools. He was raised in Dapto and attended Dapto High School, where he became school captain. He studied teaching at the University of Wollongong. He majored in health and physical education and won the university medal.

== Career ==
Park taught at Lake Illawarra High School. He then worked as a curriculum adviser at the Department of Education.

Park then went on to work further in the NSW public service and was a chief of staff to his predecessor David Campbell, the then Minister for Transport and Roads. After Campbell resigned from the ministry in early 2010, Park was named as deputy director-general of the Department of Transport. Later in the year, Campbell announced he would not contest the upcoming election and Park was chosen as the endorsed Labor candidate where he retained the seat. He held on against the Liberal party candidate, John Dorahy, a former professional rugby league footballer.

Park was appointed to the Shadow Ministry in 2012 as Shadow Minister for Roads, and was subsequently promoted to become Shadow Minister for Education and the Illawarra in 2013.

=== Second term ===
At the 2015 NSW election, Park received a large swing towards him, returning his seat to safe Labor status. Following this successful result, Park was promoted further to become the Shadow Minister for Transport, Infrastructure and the Illawarra.

In 2016, Deputy Opposition Leader Linda Burney resigned from the NSW Parliament to contest the federal seat of Barton. She was replaced as Deputy by Michael Daley. Following this, Park was appointed to Daley's former role as Shadow Treasurer in March 2016 and Daley took on Park's former portfolio of Infrastructure. Park became the third most senior Labor member of the Legislative Assembly at this time.

Park refused to contest the Labor leadership at the 2018 ballot, which was ultimately won by Michael Daley. Upon Daley's accession to the leadership, Park regained the Infrastructure portfolio from Daley.

=== Third term ===
After Labor's defeat at the 2019 election, Daley resigned as party leader and Deputy Leader Penny Sharpe of the Legislative Council was appointed as interim leader while a leadership vote that involved the rank-and-file membership of the party took place. Park again declined to contest the leadership vote and on 31 March, he was named the party's acting leader in the Legislative Assembly pending the result.

Following the leadership ballot and the appointment of Jodi McKay, Park was named Shadow Minister for Health, the South Coast, Housing and Homelessness. Park lost the Treasury and Infrastructure portfolios but retained the Shadow Ministry for the Illawarra on McKay's frontbench.

McKay resigned as Labor leader in 2021. Park once again chose not to run in the resulting leadership vote. It was subsequently won by Chris Minns who retained Park as Shadow Minister for Health, the Illawarra and the South Coast and also appointed him as Shadow Minister for Mental Health. His former portfolio of Housing and Homelessness was given to Rose Jackson.

=== Fourth term ===
Following Chris Minns' win in the 2023 election, Park was appointed Minister for Health, Minister for Regional Health and Minister for the Illawarra and South Coast.

== Personal life ==
Park lives in East Corrimal with his wife Kara and two children.

New South Wales Legislative Assembly
| Preceded by David Campbell | Member for Keira; 2011–present | Incumbent |
Political offices
| Preceded by Brad Hazzard | Minister for Health; 2023–present | Incumbent |
| Preceded by Bronnie Taylor | Minister for Regional Health; 2023–present | Incumbent |
| Preceded by Bronnie Taylor | Minister for Mental Health; 2023–2023 | Succeeded by Rose Jackson |
