= Lee Jeloscek =

Australian journalist

Lee Jeloscek is an Australian journalist. He is a former reporter for Seven News in Sydney.

== Career ==
His career began in 1999, working at The Advertiser newspaper in Adelaide. He maintained his position there for nearly five years. He also worked in London. Jeloscek started working as a court reporter with Seven News in Sydney in 2003.

As part of a team of four Seven journalists, Jeloscek won the prestigious Walkley Award for Television News Reporting, for a story on NSW Government support of ethanol. In 2014, he was nominated for a Kennedy Award in the category of outstanding political reporting.

While in 2016, he became the first Sydney journalist to do a live cross from inside a bus.

== Personal life ==
Jeloscek grew up in Adelaide, Australia. He married Sally Cummine on 4 October 2015 in Killcare, New South Wales. They met in 2010 at NSW Parliament House.

== Controversies ==
On 19 May 2011, Jeloscek was hung up on during a phone interview with popular shock jock Ray Hadley on Sydney radio station 2GB. Hadley took offence that Jeloscek wanted to correct something he asserted was suggested on-air before the interview began, and Hadley cut off Jeloscek mid-sentence.

Chief of staff to then Finance Minister Greg Pearce, Jo McCafferty, was involved in an altercation with Jeloscek at a drinks function in which a "dishevelled" McCafferty called Jeloscek a "bottom feeder". The incident reportedly related to a recent Seven News story criticising Greg Pearce.
