= That's Country =

That's Country is a New Zealand country and western television variety show broadcast between 1980 and 1984 on TVNZ. The Show was hosted by Ray Columbus and featured local as well as international talent. Local talent included Ritchie Pickett, Peter Posa, Suzanne Prentice, Patsy Riggir and the Topp Twins. American artist Emmylou Harris and Dobie Gray also performed on the show.

The series aired on The Nashville Network in the United States in the 1980s.
