= Music World (record label) =

Record label in New Zealand

- Founded: 1967
- Founder: Hoghton Hughes
- Status: Absorbed into the Music Factory
- Genre: Various
- Country of origin: Australia; New Zealand

Music World Ltd was an independent record label established in New Zealand by Hoghton Hughes. In addition to having releases on the main label, it also was a parent label to various other sub-labels.

== Background ==
Hughes had also founded the Music World label in or around 1967. He founded the Master label in 1968 and ran both until it was absorbed into Music World. Many notable New Zealand artists started on the label, such as Suzanne Prentice and Noel Parlane. Jeff Rea also started out on the label. The goal of the label was to create "low-price, mass market music".

== Subsidiaries ==
Among the subsidiaries of Music World were, the Christian music label, Trinity; children's label, Kiddidisc; TV-advertised product label, Golden Editions and the pop music label, Mirage.

The label even issued a Bob Marley single, "Thank you, Lord" on Mirage MAS-296 in 1981.
