= Suzanne Prentice =

New Zealand singer (born 1958)

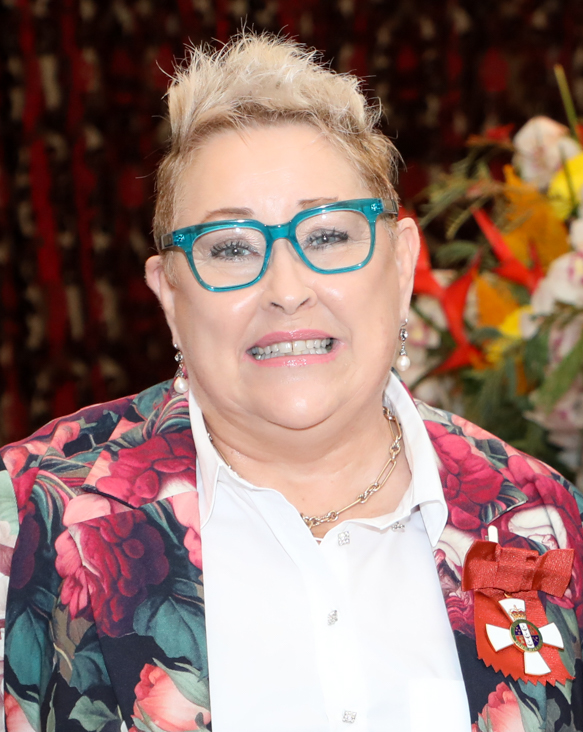
- Prentice in 2025

Background information
- Born: 19 September 1958 (age 67); Invercargill, New Zealand
- Genres: Country, pop
- Occupations: Singer, politician
- Instruments: Voice, guitar
- Labels: Master, Music World, J & B Records, Golden Editions, Mirage, CBS, EMI, RCA, K-Tel, Edge Music, Molly Music, TriStar Music, PMF Records, Trinity, Spade Productions, World Vision, Sony Music

Suzanne Lena Prentice CNZM OBE (born 19 September 1958 in Invercargill) is a New Zealand politician and country singer. Her most successful single "When I Dream" peaked at number 11 in New Zealand during 1982.

== Career ==
Having appeared on the TV talent show, Studio One - New Faces in the early 1970s, she won many fans with her version of the song "Funny Face". This got her a contract with the Music World record label. Her first single, "There's Dust on Mother's Bible" which was released on the Master label was a hit in both New Zealand and Australia. She recorded her album, Country Girl at Robbins Recording Studio in Christchurch. It was released on the Music World label. The backing and arrangements were by Murray Charteris and The Last Exit. Besides the country songs were renditions of Kris Kristofferson's "Help Me Make It Through the Night", and Susan Raye's "LA International Airport".

She recorded on 27 August 1977 with Allan Gardner and his Accordion Band live at the Marlborough RSA in Blenheim a two-album-set "Saturday Dance".

She stood as a candidate for the 2010 mayoral elections in Invercargill but was unsuccessful.

In 2016, she was presented with the Benny Award from the Variety Artists Club of New Zealand, the highest honour for a New Zealand entertainer.

== Discography ==
=== Charting albums ===
List of albums, with Australian chart positions
Title	Album details	Peak chart positions
Title	Album details	AUS
Dreamin' My Dreams	Released: 1980; Format: LP; Label: J&B (JB047)	55
One Day At a Time	Released: 1982; Format: LP; Label: J&B (JB107)	46
So Precious to Me	Released: 1984; Format: LP, Cassette; Label: kTel (NA 672)	91
Songs from the Heart – 16 Beautiful Songs	Released: 1988; Format: LP, Cassette; Label: J&B (JB327)	98

== Awards and honours ==
Prentice has won three Golden guitar awards and was inducted into the Roll of Renown at the Tamworth Country Music Awards of Australia (CMAA).

Year	Nominee / work	Award	Result
1974	Dust On Mother's Bible	Female Vocalist of the Year	Won
1977	Sweet Country Music	Female Vocalist of the Year	Won
1978	How Great Thou Art	Female Vocalist of the Year	Won
1983	One Day At a Time	Top Selling	Won

In the 1995 Birthday Honours, Prentice was appointed Officer of the Order of the British Empire (OBE) for services to music. In the 2025 New Year Honours, she was appointed Companion of the New Zealand Order of Merit (CNZM) for services to music and the community.

== See also ==
- Music of New Zealand
- 2010 New Zealand local elections
