= Waiata: Maori Showbands, Balladeers & Pop Stars =

Compilation album

Waiata : Maori Showbands, Balladeers & Pop Stars is a compilation album of historical performances by various artists released on compact disc in 2001 by His Master's Voice. It features recordings by Prince Tui Teka, the Maori Volcanics, the Howard Morrison Quartet, The Quin Tikis, Billy T. James, and John Rowles.

== Waiata : Maori Showbands, Balladeers & Pop Stars ==
=== General info ===
The album has been described as the first ever complete retrospective of popular Maori artists such as show bands, balladeers, and pop stars, covering the period from 1955 to the early 1980s. The musicians on the album range from rock‘n rollers, crooners and jazz musicians. It is representative of an era where Maori musicians were popular in dance halls, clubs and cabarets both in New Zealand and overseas. The first disc is more of the 1950s rock and roll and harmony vocal style, while the second disc is more in the seventies rhythm sound and some of the disco genre. On 5 September 2011, the album had dropped from chart position 6 to 7 in the Compilation Albums section.

=== Compiling the material ===
The music was compiled by Grant Gillanders, a music archivist based in Auckland. He had to employ a bit of detective work to track down the artists and their families. An example of what he came across was a song by Maori Allblack George Nēpia. The song, "Beneath the Maori Moon" was recorded at Decca Studios in London. Supposedly licensed to Decca, Gillanders found out that Decca had no record of the licensing agreement so the ownership of the song now belongs to the Nēpia family which gives them the right to license it to music collections or film, etc. His involvement in the project was approximately five years.

=== Mastering and production ===
It was mastered by Simon Lynch and Robert Stebbing at Stebbing Recording Centre, with vinyl transfers by Steve McGough. It was manufactured and distributed by EMI.

=== Disc info ===
His Master's Voice 50999 6802952 4, EMI – 50999 6802952
2011

Disc 1
No	Act	Track	Year
01	Johnny Cooper & Ken Avery & His Rockin Rhythm Group	"Rock Around The Clock"	1955
02	Howard Morrison Quartet	"Diana"	1958
03	"Eddie Howell & The Bob Paris Combo"	"Kansas City"	1959
04	Jay Epae	"Putti Putti"	1960
05	Maori Troubadors	"Shaking In the Shaky Isles"	1961
06	Laurie Morrison & the Dell Kings	"Nobody But Me"	1961
07	Ricky May with Bob Paris & The Peppermints	"I Could Have Danced All Night"	1962
08	Sonny Day & The Sundowners	"Wolverton Mountain"	1962
09	Lisa Nuku & The Quin Tikis	"Naturally"	1962
10	The Kini Quartet	"Under The Sun"	1963
11	Rim D Paul & The Quin Tikis	"Poi Poi Twist"	1963
12	Rino Tirikatene & The Blockbusters	"Times Is Tough"	1964
13	The Kini Quartet	"The Hitchhiker"	1964
14	Gerry Merito	"My Voice Keeps Changing On Me"	1966
15	Howard Morrison	"Don't Let It Get You"	1966
16	The Quin Tikis	"She's the Girl"	1966
17	JA-AR (aka John Rowles)	"The End (of the Rainbow)"	1966
18	Jay Epae	"Tumblin Down"	1966
19	Billy Karaitiana	"Cool Jerk"	1967
20	The Radars	"Don't Get Around Much Anymore"	1967
21	John Rowles	"If I Only Had Time"	1968
22	The Castaways feat Frankie Stevens	"Angelica"	1968
23	Nash Chase	"Gimme A Little Sign	1970
24	The Shevelles	"Beat the Clock"	1968
25	Frankie Price aka Rowles	"Another Tear Falls"	1969

Disc 2
No	Act	Track	Year
01	John Rowles	M'Lady	1969
02	Nash Chase	"What Greater Love"	1969
03	The Quin Tikis	"What Now My Love"	1968
04	Keri Summers	"Via Con Dias"	1969
05	The Quin Tikis feat Eddie Low	"Maria"	1968
06	Frankie Price (aka Rowles)	"Sweet Mary"	1970
07	Frankie Stevens	" My Elusive Dream"	1970
08	Tui Fox	"Only A Fool Breaks His Own Heart"	1970
09	Bunny Walters	"Brandy"	1972
10	Rangi Parker	"Everyday Is Sunday"	1972
11	Mortimer King	"Why In the Name Heaven"	1972
12	Bunny Walters	"Take the Money & Run"	1972
13	Billy T.K & Powerhouse	"Move On Up" (Part 1 edit)	1972
14	Dalvanius & The Fascinations	"Love Train"	1973
15	The Maori Volcanics	"Never Can Say Goodbye"	1975
16	Mark Williams	"Yesterday Was Just The Beginning Of My Life"	1975
17	Frankie Stevens	"Dancing In the Moonlight"	1978
18	Tui Fox	"Bounce Baby Bounce"	1974
19	Mark Williams	"Sweet Wine"	1975
20	John Rowles	"Tania"	1978
21	Prince Tui Teka and Rockinghorse	"For The Life Of Me"	1972
22	Deane Waretini	"The Bridge (alt version)	
23	Prince Tui Teka & Missy	"E Ipo" (first version)	1980
24	Billy T. James	"Is You Is Or Is You Ain't My Baby"	1980
25	Howard Morrison	"How Great Thou Art"	

== Waiata 2 : Maori Showbands, Balladeers & Pop Stars ==
=== General info ===
The review on the Elsewhere site gives the impression that the album is more in the MOR vein. Among the artists is Frankie Price who is the older brother of John Rowles. The album also includes "Hollywood Dreams" which was the final single release for Golden Harvest. The album received a 3/5 star rating from Stephanie Arthur-Worsop of The Aucklander.

=== Compiling the material ===
The album was compiled by Grant Gillanders.

=== Mastering and production ===
Mastering and tape transfers were made at Stebbing Recording Center. The tape transfers were done by Steve McGough and the mastering by Simon Lynch. It was published in New Zealand by Sony Music Entertainment in 2013. Grant Gillanders produced the album for Frenzy Music Productions.

=== Disc info ===
Disc 1
No	Act	Track	Year
01	Inia Te Wiata	"The Wanderer"	
02	The Howard Morrison Quartet	"Lonesome Traveller"	
03	Rino Tirikatene	"Butterfly"	
04	Paul Walden	"The King Of Holiday Island"	
05	Jay Epae	"Hula Cha"	
06	Johnny Cooper	"Cold Cold Heart"	
07	Ricky May	"Spanish Harlem"	
08	The Kini Quartet	"Maori Is A Loving Tongue"	
09	The Quin Tikis	"Maori Medley"	
10	John Rowles	"Cheryl Moana Marie"	
11	Frankie Stevens	"You’re Such A Good Looking Woman"	
12	Quincy Conserve	"Hallelujah"	
13	Eddie Low	"Blue Smoke"	
14	Frankie Price aka Rowles	"Ballad Of Pancho Lopez"	
15	The Neketini Brass	"Hoki Mai"	
16	The Kini Quartette	"The Valley Inn"	
17	The Shevelles	"One Man Band"	
18	Bunny Walters	"The Nearest Thing To Heaven"	
19	Deane Waretini	"The Wonder Of You"	
20	Abe Phillips	"Don't Think You Remember Me"	
21	Dennis August	"You Gave Me A Mountain"	
22	Erana Clark	"Angel Eyes"	
23	Tania Rowles	"Don't Turn Around"	
24	The Trilights	"One Tin Soldier"	
25	Missy Teka	"Halfway To Paradise"	
26	Prince Tui Teka	"Smoke Gets In Your Eyes"	
27	Gerry Merito	"Po Atarau"	

Disc 2
No	Act	Track	Year
01	Quincy Conserve	"Going Back To The Garden"	
02	Butler	"Green River"	
03	Golden Harvest	"Hollywood Dreams"	
04	Sonny Day & The All Stars	"Saving Up"	
05	Mark Williams	"Show No Mercy"	
06	Jon Stevens	"Working Class Game"	
07	Kim Hart	"Love At First Night"	
08	Dalvanius & The Fascinations	"Chapel Of Love"	
09	Frankie Stevens	"Rescue Me"	
10	80 In The Shade	Heatwave"	
11	The Consorts	"Maoris On 45"	
12	Moana & The Moahunters	Black Pearl"	
13	Southside Of Bombay	"What's The Time Mr Wolf"	
14	Herbs	"Listen"	
15	Aotearoa	"Young Gifted And Black"	
16	Dread Beat & Blood	"I Unity"	
17	Ardijah	"When The Feeling Is Gone"	
18	Maree Sheehan	"Past To The Present"	
19	Meg and the Fones	"Little Tui"	
20	Emma Paki	"Greenstone"	
21	Pātea Māori Club	"Hei Konei Ra" (Farewell)	
