= John Rowles discography =

- Studio albums: 15
- Live albums: 4
- Compilation albums: 12
- Singles: 49

This article is the discography of New Zealand singer John Rowles.

== Albums ==
=== Studio albums ===
| Year | Title | Details | Peak chart positions | |
| Year | Title | Details | NZ | AUS |
|---|---|---|---|---|
| 1968 | John Rowles | Released: 1968; Label: CBS, MCA | — | — |
| 1969 | That Lovin' Feeling | Released: 1969; Label: CBS, MCA | — | — |
| 1970 | Time for Love | Released: 1970; Label: CBS, MCA, Kapp | — | — |
| 1971 | Saying Goodbyes | Released: 1971; Label: MCA, Kapp | — | — |
| 1978 | This Is My Life | Released: 1978; Label: EMI, Interfusion | 6 | — |
| 1980 | Rhythm of the City | Released: 1980; Label: EMI, Paradise Productions | — | — |
| 1982 | Another Chapter | Released: 1982; Label: EMI, RCA | 7 | — |
| 1984 | Thank You with Love | Released: 1984; Label: RCA; Released in Australia as In the Portrait of My Mind | — | — |
| 1985 | Pearls | Released: 1985; Label: RCA | — | — |
| 1986 | Love Songs | Released: October 1986; Label: RCA, J&B | 37 | 57 |
| 1988 | In My Wildest Dreams | Released: 1988; Label: RCA | — | — |
| 1991 | From a Distance | Released: April 1991; Label: RCA, J&B | 19 | 16 |
| 1998 | Giver and Taker of Love Tonight | Released: 1998; Label: BMG | — | — |
| 2008 | The Singer and the Songs – John Rowles Sings the Classics | Released: 2 May 2008; Label: Rajon | 30 | — |
| 2014 | The Greatest Song of All | Released: 2014; Label: JDB Music | — | — |
"—" denotes releases that did not chart or were not released in that territory.

=== Live albums ===
| Year | Title | Details | Peak chart positions |
| Year | Title | Details | NZ |
|---|---|---|---|
| 1972 | John Rowles in South Africa | Released: 10 January 1972; Label: MCA; US-only release | — |
| 1974 | Live Back Home | Released: 1974; Label: Pye; Live at His Majesty's Theatre, Auckland | 15 |
| 1991 | John Rowles Live in Concert | Released: 1991; Label: RCA; Live at the Aotea Centre, Auckland on 15 December 1990 | — |
| 2003 | Voice of a Legend – The Millennium Collection Volume 1 | Released: 2003; Label: Rajon; Live in Auckland in 1976 | — |
"—" denotes releases that did not chart or were not released in that territory.

=== Compilation albums ===
| Year | Title | Details | Peak chart positions | |
| Year | Title | Details | NZ | AUS |
|---|---|---|---|---|
| 1968 | The Exciting John Rowles | Released: May 1968; Label: Kapp; US and Canada-only release; Re-released in 1970 as Cheryl Moana Marie | — | — |
| 1973 | Gold | Released: 1973; Label: MCA Coral | — | — |
| 1974 | If I Only Had Time | Released: 1974; Label: MCA Coral | — | — |
| 1976 | Rowled Gold | Released: 1976; Label: Pye | — | — |
| 1984 | The Very Best of John Rowles | Released: 1984; Label: EMI | 7 | — |
| 1985 | Now & Then | Released: August 1985; Label: J&B; Australia-only release | — | 16 |
| 1990 | The Very Best of John Rowles and Engelbert Humperdinck | Released: June 1990; Label: J&B; Split album with Engelbert Humperdinck; Australia-only release | — | 34 |
| 1992 | Soul & Affection – 14 Classic Hits | Released: May 1992; Label: J&B; Australia-only release | — | 75 |
| 1996 | The John Rowles Hits Collection | Released: July 1996; Label: EMI | — | — |
| 2003 | The Great John Rowles | Released: April 2003; Label: Rajon | — | — |
| 2003 | Voice of a Legend – The Millennium Collection Volume 2 | Released: 2003; Label: Self-released | — | — |
| 2011 | Hits and Love Songs | Released: 25 April 2011; Label: Sony Music/Rajon | 4 | — |
| 2012 | If I Only Had Time – The Anthology | Released: 2 November 2012; Label: Universal Music New Zealand | 24 | — |
"—" denotes releases that did not chart or were not released or were not released in that territory.

== Singles ==
| Year | Single | Peak chart positions | | | | | | | | | | Album |
| Year | Single | NZ | AUS | BE (FLA) | BE (WA) | CAN | GER | IRE | NL | UK | US | Album |
|---|---|---|---|---|---|---|---|---|---|---|---|---|
| 1966 | "The End (Of the Rainbow)" (as JA-AR) | — | — | — | — | — | — | — | — | — | — | Non-album singles |
| 1967 | "Please Help Me I'm Falling" (as JA-AR) | — | — | — | — | — | — | — | — | — | — | Non-album singles |
| 1967 | "I Remember Mamma" (as JA-AR; Australia-only release) | — | — | — | — | — | — | — | — | — | — | Non-album singles |
| 1968 | "If I Only Had Time" | 2 | 5 | 2 | — | — | 15 | 6 | 2 | 3 | — | John Rowles |
| 1968 | "Hush... Not a Word to Mary" | 9 | 8 | 4 | 33 | — | 37 | 8 | 19 | 12 | — | Non-album singles |
| 1968 | "The Pain Goes on Forever" | 4 | 65 | 6 | 31 | — | — | — | — | — | — | Non-album singles |
| 1968 | "Say Goodbye" | — | 68 | 11 | 39 | — | — | — | — | — | — | Non-album singles |
| 1969 | "M'Lady" (Note: "M'Lady" was released as the B-side to "Say Goodbye", except for in New Zealand where it was released as the A-side.) | 1 | — | — | — | — | — | — | — | — | — | Non-album singles |
| 1969 | "One Day" | — | — | 19 | 33 | — | — | — | — | — | — | Non-album singles |
| 1969 | "In the World of the Young" (US-only release) | — | — | — | — | — | — | — | — | — | — | That Lovin' Feeling |
| 1969 | "It Takes a Fool Like Me" | — | — | 15 | 33 | — | — | — | — | — | — | Non-album singles |
| 1969 | "Everybody's Talkin'" (Continental Europe-only release) | — | — | — | — | — | — | — | — | — | — | Non-album singles |
| 1970 | "That Wonderful Sound" (Australia-only release) | — | 71 | — | — | — | — | — | — | — | — | Non-album singles |
| 1970 | "Save the Last Dance for Me" | — | — | 11 | 38 | — | — | — | — | — | — | That Lovin' Feeling |
| 1970 | "Cheryl Moana Marie" | 1 | 20 | — | — | 76 | — | — | — | — | 64 | Time for Love |
| 1970 | "Time for Love" | — | — | — | — | — | — | — | — | — | — | Time for Love |
| 1970 | "I Remember Mama" (re-release) | — | — | — | — | — | — | — | — | — | — | Non-album singles |
| 1970 | "No Love at All" | — | — | — | — | — | — | — | — | — | — | Non-album singles |
| 1970 | "A House Is Not Home" | — | — | — | — | — | — | — | — | — | — | Time for Love |
| 1971 | "Come on Back and Get It" | — | — | — | — | — | — | — | — | — | — | Time for Love |
| 1971 | "Wheel of Fortune" (Italy-only release) | — | — | — | — | — | — | — | — | — | — | That Lovin' Feeling |
| 1971 | "Since I Fell for You" | — | — | — | — | — | — | — | — | — | — | Saying Goodbyes |
| 1971 | "I Apologize" | — | — | — | — | — | — | — | — | — | — | Saying Goodbyes |
| 1971 | "Mrs Smith" (US-only release) | — | — | — | — | — | — | — | — | — | — | Saying Goodbyes |
| 1972 | "She's All I Got" | — | — | — | — | — | — | — | — | — | — | Non-album singles |
| 1972 | "Blue on Blue" | — | — | — | — | — | — | — | — | — | — | Non-album singles |
| 1972 | "More Than Just a Woman" | — | — | — | — | — | — | — | — | — | — | Non-album singles |
| 1973 | "Can't You Feel It" | — | — | — | — | — | — | — | — | — | — | Non-album singles |
| 1973 | "If I Could Tell You Why" (UK-only release) | — | — | — | — | — | — | — | — | — | — | Non-album singles |
| 1976 | "Anyone Who Had a Heart" | — | — | — | — | — | — | — | — | — | — | Rowled Gold |
| 1978 | "Tania (This Song Is for You)" | 1 | 39 | — | — | — | — | — | — | — | — | This Is My Life |
| 1978 | "If I Ever Have to Say Goodbye" | 40 | — | — | — | — | — | — | — | — | — | This Is My Life |
| 1978 | "Fools Rush In" | — | — | — | — | — | — | — | — | — | — | This Is My Life |
| 1979 | "Beautiful Lady" | — | — | — | — | — | — | — | — | — | — | Rhythm of the City |
| 1981 | "Island in the Sun" | 4 | — | — | — | — | — | — | — | — | — | Another Chapter |
| 1982 | "Devil or Angel" | 16 | — | — | — | — | — | — | — | — | — | Another Chapter |
| 1984 | "Thank You with Love for Loving Me" | — | — | — | — | — | — | — | — | — | — | Thank You with Love |
| 1984 | "You Are Always on My Mind"/"To All the Girls I've Loved" | — | — | — | — | — | — | — | — | — | — | Non-album single |
| 1985 | "Pearls" | — | — | — | — | — | — | — | — | — | — | Pearls |
| 1985 | "Tahiti" | — | — | — | — | — | — | — | — | — | — | Pearls |
| 1986 | "A Bridge Across Forever" | — | — | — | — | — | — | — | — | — | — | Non-album single |
| 1988 | "Baby I Need Your Lovin'" (Australia-only release) | — | — | — | — | — | — | — | — | — | — | In My Wildest Dreams |
| 1990 | "It's Christmas All Over the World" | 49 | — | — | — | — | — | — | — | — | — | Non-album singles |
| 1992 | "Daffodil Day" (with Malvina Major & New Zealand Symphony Orchestra) | 17 | — | — | — | — | — | — | — | — | — | Non-album singles |
| 2006 | "I Know I'm Bad... But I'm Good for You" | — | — | — | — | — | — | — | — | — | — | Non-album singles |
| 2008 | "My Special Corner of the World" | — | — | — | — | — | — | — | — | — | — | The Singer and the Songs |
| 2012 | "Once Upon a Time" | — | — | — | — | — | — | — | — | — | — | If I Only Had Time – The Anthology |
| 2014 | "I'll Be Her" | — | — | — | — | — | — | — | — | — | — | Non-album singles |
| 2016 | "The Losing Game" | — | — | — | — | — | — | — | — | — | — | Non-album singles |
"—" denotes releases that did not chart or were not released in that territory.
