= Golden Harvest =

Golden Harvest or The Golden Harvest may refer to:

- Orange Sky Golden Harvest, a film production, distribution and exhibition company based in Hong Kong, often shortened to Golden Harvest
- The Golden Harvest, a 1944 novel by Brazilian author Jorge Amado
- Golden Harvest (band), a New Zealand band
  - Golden Harvest (album), the band's debut 1978 album
- Golden Harvest Seeds, a U.S.-based subsidiary of Syngenta that produces hybrid seed for agriculture
- Golden Harvest (film), a 1933 American drama
- Golden Harvest (book), a 2011 book by Jan T. Gross
