= Tina Cross =

New Zealand singer

Tina Cross ONZM
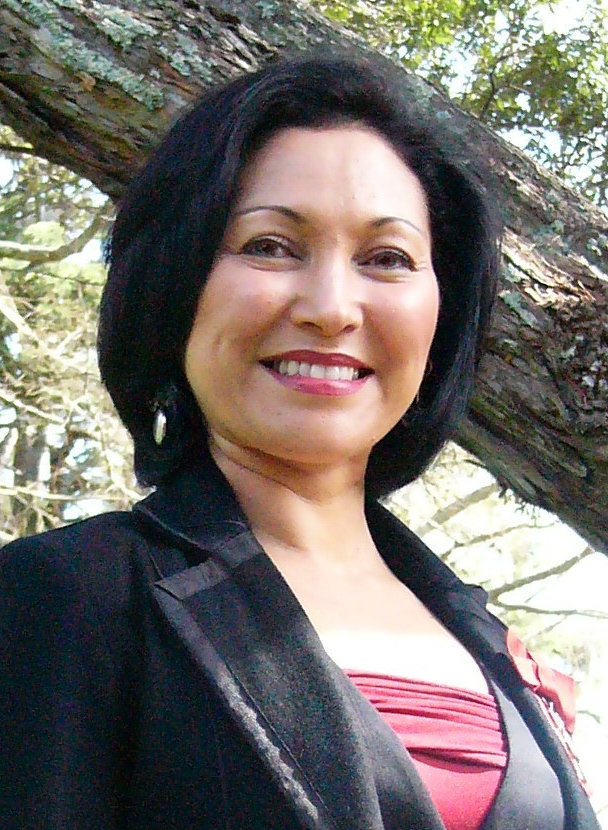
- Cross in 2007

Background information
- Born: Tina Marie Cross; 27 January 1959 (age 67); Auckland, New Zealand
- Genre: Pop
- Occupations: Singer, songwriter
- Instruments: Vocals, ukulele
- Years active: 1976–present
- Website: www.tinacross.com

Tina Marie Cross ONZM (born 27 January 1959) is a New Zealand singer. She sang the winning entry in the 1979 Pacific Song Contest, and was the lead vocalist of synthpop band, Koo De Tah, whose single "Too Young for Promises" was a top ten hit in Australia in 1985.

== Biography ==
=== 1959–1974: Early days and TV ===
Cross is one of six siblings and grew up in Ōtara from the age of four, except for a three-year stint in Kaitaia. Of Māori descent, she affiliates to Te Aupōuri and Ngāti Porou. Cross' mother is of Maori-Croatian descent. While the family were in Northland, Tina and one of her siblings won a talent quest.

In 1974, her friend, Kim Hart, encouraged Cross to audition for the school's musical productions with their band, Chalkdust, and the pair sharing singing duties. In 1975, the group auditioned for television talent show Opportunity Knocks and while the band missed out, the producers saw enough in 16-year-old Cross to offer her a one-year contract where she learned her craft. Cross was soon presenting herself to a national audience via popular television shows such as Smile and Once More With Feeling.

In 1976, Tina Cross and Kim Hart was in the Penrose High School Band, Chalkdust. Chalkdust became a finalist in the 1976 Battle of the Bands competition. Kim Hart would sign with EMI Australia in 1977 and would have a top 10 hit "Love At First Night" by 1980.

In 1977 Cross spent some time as a dancer on the television show, Top of the World and also appeared on several episodes of Ready to Roll, where she sang the current popular hits of the day. In 1978 Cross won the rising star award at the Entertainer of the Year awards.

=== 1979–1982: New Zealand music ===
In 1979, Cross released four singles, all of which made the top 50 of the New Zealand charts. Her fourth single, "Nothing But Dreams", was the New Zealand entry into the 1979 Pacific Song Contest, which it won. Cross released her debut studio album You Can Do It in 1979.

In 1980, Cross again represented New Zealand at the Pacific Song Contest, this time, a duet with Derek Metzger titled, "Once Again With You", taking out second place. Cross began working on a second studio album, a shift from disco to new wave ultimately failed and the album, Tina X, did not chart.

From 13 October 1982 she fronted the musical TV series Nothing But Dreams, broadcast on Two for five weeks. Cross maintained a high profile with numerous television appearances and in 1982 she relocated across the Tasman to Sydney, Australia and began singing on the cabaret circuit.

=== 1983–1990: Koo De Tah ===
In 1984 she teamed up with composer-pianist Leon Berger and formed Koo De Tah. They had a hit with "Too Young for Promises" in 1985 which made it to 6 on the Australian charts, two further singles "Body Talk" and "Think of Me" were released and a self-titled album in 1986. The group disbanded in 1987.

Following Koo De Tah, Cross launched a corporate cabaret act and toured India and Asia before returning to Auckland in 1990.

=== 1990–2005: Theatre ===
In 1992, Cross sang the vocals on the original theme song for the television soap opera Shortland Street, composed by Graham Bollard.

In 1995 she appeared in touring productions of The Rocky Horror Show and Cats. She was named Best Theatrical Performer in 1995. Over the following decade, Cross played major roles including the stage musical drama adaption of Once Were Warriors, (Michael Jackson's) Sisterella, Chicago, Boogie Nights and Miss Saigon, and produced The World Goes Round.

=== 2005–2011: The Lady Killers and Dancing with the Stars ===
In 2005 Cross co-founded the harmony group The Lady Killers with fellow vocalists Suzanne Lynch and Jackie Clarke.

In 2007, Cross's career and charity work was recognised when she was named as an Officer of the New Zealand Order of Merit in the 2007 Queen's Birthday Honours, for services to the music industry. In 2008, Cross was a contestant in the 2008 New Zealand series of Dancing with the Stars, placing fifth overall. The Lady Killers released an album, Black is Back, in 2009.

=== 2012–present: return to music ===
In 2012, Cross worked with Australian DJ and music producer StereoLove. Together, they released three singles including a cover of "Too Young for Promises" by Koo De Tah. Cross recommenced writing and in June 2014, Cross released the single "Walk Away", which written to raise funds and awareness for Women's Refuge. Cross released her third studio album Lay Down Your Heart in October 2014.

In October 2014, she was presented with the Benny Award from the Variety Artists Club of New Zealand Inc, the highest honour available for a New Zealand variety entertainer.

In November 2017, Cross released "Another Little One", a song Cross wrote inspired by toddler Moko Tangitoheriri's brutal death. The single was released as the centrepiece of Shine's annual Christmas campaign in 2017, asking that no more children be lost to violence or suffer abuse.

== Discography ==
=== Albums ===
Year	Title	Details
1979	You Can Do It	Label: Philips; Catalogue: 6334017; Format: LP, cassette
1980	Tina X	Label: Polygram; Catalogue: 6456 010; Format: LP
2014	Lay Down Your Heart	Released: 17 October 2014; Label: Tina Cross; Format: Digital download

=== Singles ===
Year	Title	Peak chart positions	Album
Year	Title	NZ	Album
1979	"Make Love to Me"	15	You Can Do It
1979	"Everybody Let's Dance"	13	You Can Do It
1979	"Lay Back in Your Lover's Arms"	38	You Can Do It
1979	"Nothing But Dreams"	47	Non-album single
1980	"This Time"	—	Tina X
1982	"Losing Your Touch"	—	non-album single
1983	"Ring Around My Finger"	—	non-album single
1984	"New Blood"	—	non-album single
2012	"Too Young for Promises" (Stereolove featuring Tina Cross)	—	non-album single
2012	"I Wish That" (Stereolove featuring Tina Cross)	—	non-album single
2013	"Burn It Up" (Stereolove featuring Tina Cross)	—	non-album single
2014	"Walk Away"	—	Lay Down Your Heart
2017	"Another Little One"	—	non-album single
"—" denotes a recording that did not chart or was not released in that territory.

== Awards ==
=== Mo Awards ===
The Australian Entertainment Mo Awards (commonly known informally as the Mo Awards), were annual Australian entertainment industry awards. They recognise achievements in live entertainment in Australia from 1975 to 2016. Tina Cross won one awards in that time.

Year	Nominee / work	Award	Result (wins only)
1983	Tina Cross	Johnny O'Keefe Encouragement Award	Won

== See also ==
- Koo De Tah
