= One Tree Hill College =

Location
- Physical: 421–451 Great South Road, Penrose, Auckland 1061, New Zealand; Postal: PO Box 17471, Greenlane, Auckland 1546, New Zealand; 36.9035°S 174.8064°E

Information
- Type: State, co-educational, secondary school
- Motto: 'Ad Altiora Contende' 'Whaia e Koe te iti Kahurangi' ('Strive For Higher Things')
- Established: 1955
- Ministry of Education Institution no.: 85
- Principal: Nick Coughlan
- Enrolment: 1,472 (July 2026)
- Socio-economic decile: 3G
- Website: onetreehillcollege.school.nz

One Tree Hill College is a state coeducational secondary school located in the district of Ellerslie in Auckland, New Zealand.

One Tree Hill College, known as Penrose High School until 2008, opened on 1 February 1955. In 2019 it had a student body of 1160 consisting of more than 40 different cultures.

The governing body for the college since 1989 has been the One Tree Hill College Board of Trustees. It provides curriculum, discipline and financial oversight but day-to-day management of the college, within the board's policy framework, is handled by the principal and the senior leadership team.

== History ==
Penrose takes its name from Penrose Farm carved out of about 400ha (1000 acres) of land purchased by Cornishman William Williams from the Maori owners in 1843.

School in February 1955

Williams (1806–1876), not related to the Anglican missionary of the same name, named the farm after Penrose Farm in the parish of Budock, Cornwall, where he is thought to have been born (though there is no record of this) and where his father was allegedly bailiff. According to Williams it was the ‘best farm in Budock, and the best in all Cornwall’.

Research by foundation principal Ron Stacey reveals the property on which Penrose High School stands originally formed part of land granted to James Haldane Watt, a settler, on 10 December 1847. When he died in 1876 he left it to his two sons, Robert Henry Watt and David Bruce Watt. It was later mortgaged to Alfred Greatback Glover who gained ownership in 1884 after the Watts defaulted. It was later let to Jane Board of Ellerslie and sold to her in 1896. The land was later subdivided.

The Department of Education starting acquiring land for a secondary school during the period of the first Labour government. Once secondary education became more accessible after the abolition of the proficiency certificate in 1937, the department set its sights on building a super-school of superior quality — a ‘landmark’ in Ministry of Works’ parlance.

Prizegiving 3 December 1955. The school was also officially opened on this date.

Penrose High School is said to have been designed with the view that it could serve as a hospital in the event of war (it came onto the drawingboard at the start of World War II). Its staff facilities, accessways and corridors, far more generous in size than for most New Zealand secondary schools, certainly give the impression that it was planned for another use.

The Department of Education’s standard plans were for schools of 400 and 600 pupils. Penrose, which initially had the working name of ‘Ellerslie Grammar School’, was built for 750 to 800 pupils and, 58 years after it opened, it retains some of the finest school buildings anywhere in the country.

The site was difficult to build on, not least because of the large amounts of volcanic rock that had to be excavated. In the first year, after the initial buildings were opened, £48,000 had to be spent developing the school grounds. It was to take several years before the outworks were completed.

Original Whanau House

=== Whanau House introduction ===
On 20 April 1977 Penrose High School’s ‘home within a school’, Whanau House, was opened by Education Minister Les Gander in keeping with Maori protocol. Maori elder Eruera Kawhia Stirling gave the opening speech in Maori and the minister replied in Maori. Whanau House — described as a ‘place for people to live, learn, laugh, relax and respond and related as an extended family in the true spirit of Whanau’ — was the crowning glory of Murray Print’s principalship.

Planned in 1974, the complex initially accommodated 250 pupils between third and seventh form. While it was billed as a world first, the Whanau House concept would reflect as much on European educational tradition as Maori culture. It signalled the introduction of a house system that had been a feature of English private schools ("public" in British parlance) since time immemorial. (Penrose had already operated a loose house system for its summer sports day from 1969–75, though it had never been embraced by the school proper). The challenge for Print’s successor, John Rose, was to extend the Whanau House benefits across the whole school.

Whanau House became Hinau House and four other houses were established — Kowhai, Miro, Tawa and Rata. By 1979 they each had their designated commons areas and distinct identities, including house colours — Hinau (white), Kowhai (yellow), Miro (green), Tawa (blue) and Rata (red).

Competition was an important part of the house system from the beginning. In 1977 the houses competed in athletics with Hinau taking first place and it held that lead when a range of non-sporting endeavours were assessed. An Interhouse Shield has been competed for most years.

The number of houses was reduced from five to four (with the abolition of Rata) after 1982 because of a drop in the school roll. At this time Tawa's house colour was changed from blue to red, and Hinau from white to purple. The house system, as controversial as it was challenging, came to an end in the late 1990s and Penrose reverted to a more traditional class format. Classes were organised on a house system in 1999 but from 2000 the house system applied to sports competition only, until 2008 when it was reinvented with the $15 million property upgrade. The whanau system is now extremely strong at the college is fundamental to the college's many successes since 2008.

=== $15 million property redevelopment ===
Between 2006 and 2009, $15 million was spent on redevelopment — upgrading the college's buildings, facilities and computer network. The upgrade was aimed to 'modernise the school and ensure that students have access to the very best educational facilities'.

=== Rebranding of college ===
The name change of Penrose High School to One Tree Hill College took place on 21 July 2008 after extensive consultation with parents, past pupils and the college's wider community. The name was changed as the college re-invented itself in all aspects. The college was officially reopened and rededicated on 13 March 2009 by John Key, New Zealand prime minister. A former student, singer Tina Cross, also took part in this ceremony.

Afterwards, the college released flyers to over 25,000 homes in the surrounding area promoting the new college.

== Enrolment ==
As of July 2026, One Tree Hill College has a roll of 1,472 students, of which 254 (17.3%) identify as Māori.

As of 2026, the school has an Equity Index of 466, placing it amongst schools whose students have average socioeconomic barriers to achievement (roughly equivalent to deciles 5 and 6 under the former socio-economic decile system).

== Traditions ==
=== House (Whanau) system ===
One Tree Hill College's house system, which dates from 1969, consists of four houses or whanau (Maori for family).

The whanau system fell away in 1996 but was reintroduced in 2008 and strengthened by current Principal, Nick Coughlan. The whanau system now is the major underpinning pastoral care system in the college.

The name of each house is a Māori word for a New Zealand indigenous tree.

House	Original Colour	Current Colour	Affiliated Tree
Hinau			Elaeocarpus dentaus
Tawa			Beilschmiedia tawa
Miro			Prumnopitys ferruginea
Kowhai			Sophora microphylla
Rata		Defunct	Metrosideros robusta

In 2009 students were placed into their respective whanau as part of a reimplementation of the houses system which the college originally pioneered.

In early 2009 each house was given a tree to plant outside its common rooms. The planting of the Tawa, Hinau, Miro and Kowhai trees outside their respective houses symbolised the beginning of a new era of education for One Tree Hill College.

=== College crest ===
The crest of the college was adopted before the college opened on 1 February 1955. It was altered in 1999 when a red band was added but has otherwise remained unchanged The crest depicts the summit of the former Maori pa (fortress), One Tree Hill/Maungakiekie, that overlooks the college, and symbolises the strong connection between One Tree Hill and the community.

=== College prayer and hymn ===
The college has its own prayer, implemented during John Rose's principalship. One Tree Hill also has its own hymn, Martin Shaw's 'Go Forth With God', which came into use during Ron Stacey's foundation principalship.

The college prayer is said at the end of every assembly but the hymn is not sung regularly.

== Facilities ==
Due to the redevelopment, the following facilities were either built or refurbished and renamed in honour of key individuals in the college's history:

- Rotary Art Lobby, in recognition of the long friendship and support from the Rotary Club of Penrose to the college.
- Marilyn Wales Auditorium recognition of the leadership and governance of Marilyn C. Wales (née Morse), chair of the Board of Trustees from 1999-2006.
- Murray Print Memorial Knowledge Centre in recognition of the contribution of the college's second principal, J. Murray Print (1923–1990). The former library had been dedicated in his honour.
- Ron Stacey Memorial Gymnasium in recognition of the leadership of the foundation principal, Ronald S. Stacey (1909–1983). The former swimming pool (on the site of the new gymnasium) had been dedicated in his honour.
- Wallace Crossman Art Department in recognition of Wallace Crossman's contribution during the time he taught art at the college (1961–1979). Mr Crossman and Mr Print developed the college's art collection.

=== Ultrafast Fibre Broadband ===
In 2012, One Tree Hill College was connected onto the ultrafast fibre broadband network. This allows the college to develop a full wireless network to allow students to utilise their own devices across the entire college.

=== Art collection ===
One Tree Hill College has a significant New Zealand art collection, which was started in 1969 by the former principal Murray Print, with the aid of Wallace Crossman (head of art). The collection was originally funded by proceeds from the college 'tuckshop' (canteen) and has subsequently received gifts and donations but no public money. Over the years it expanded to include works by Gretchen Albrecht, W.A. Sutton, Colin McCahon, Patrick Hanly, Robin White, Toss Woollaston, Allen Maddox, Don Peebles and Ralph Hotere. There is also an important collection of ceramics by Len Castle. The much-loved art collection is an important part of One Tree Hill College's culture. It is managed and curated by an independent trust.

== Education Review Office Report (ERO) ==
In 2009 the college received a glowing report from the New Zealand Education Review Office. Its final report described the college as having strong governance and leadership, effective teaching, a 'safe' college culture, high staff and student morale and improved academic results. The office praised progress at the college, noting that staff and students were proud of their campus and had a strong sense of belonging. It identified improvements in the teaching of Maori and Pacific Island students as contributing to the college's turnaround.

In 2012 the subsequent ERO report was exceptional, focussing on the very good teaching which was evident across the college. All aspects of the college were highlighted and praised.

In 2015 the ERO report was outstanding, highlighting the excellent teaching and learning which was evident across the college. ERO placed the school on the highest 4-5 year review cycle for high performing schools.

== Academic achievement ==
One Tree Hill College's results have continued to reflect the strong teaching occurring at the college. The NCEA results are now above national means. There has also been a significant increase in the number of students achieving their NCEA endorsed with merit and excellence.

== Student life ==
The college provides a wide variety of opportunities for learning. Students will soon be able to use their laptops and tablets to access the campus-wide wireless network and broadband internet service. Teachers encourage students to get involved in school-life.

Students also participate in numerous musical and cultural events such as the Auckland Secondary School's Polyfest and Stage Challenge.

=== Cultural groups ===
A French club, Le Club Français, was formed in 1965 but the oldest of Penrose High School’s indigenous cultural groups, the Polynesian Club, was formed in 1970. By 1985 it had Maori, Tongan, Samoan and Cook Island sections and by 1988 Niuean culture was also included. These sections later became independent groups. By 1993 there was also an Indian culture group. The groups played an important part in the school’s cultural life, performing a cultural/festival week which started in the mid-1970s and was held most years. By 1999 an Arabic Group and a separate Kapa Haka Group had been formed. The college now boasts cultural groups in various cultures, including a Filipino and Spanish group.

=== Interact Club ===
One Tree Hill College provides many extracurricular opportunities for service. In 2009, the Interact Club of One Tree Hill College was founded in conjunction with the Penrose Rotary Club. It gives One Tree Hill College students an opportunity to serve and give back to their local community as well as organises other service events such as the annual World Vision 40 Hour Famine, which raises money for international projects. Other service projects organised by the Interact Club include fundraising events for certain charities and organising members for annual appeals.

=== Duke of Edinburgh's Award ===
One Tree Hill College encourages personal development by offering students the Duke of Edinburgh's Award programme. It motivates young people to become involved in a programme of voluntary and self-development activities. The award helps takes students through a potentially difficult period of schooling. It is a major international programme that is recognised by organisations around the world.

Depending on the varying ability and commitment level, there are three levels, bronze, silver and gold. Students participate out of school hours in numerous community services, physically challenging and personal skill-based activities. It is an optional extension to the existing Outdoor Education Programme of Year camps.

== Sporting achievement ==
One Tree Hill College participates in several interschool sports competitions. Despite having a relatively small student body, the college achieves exceptionally well in many competitions. One Tree Hill College are four time New Zealand Baseball Champions and the college's girls' softball team again won the New Zealand national championship in 2007 (runner-up in 2017 & 2019), reflecting a strong softball tradition at the college. In 2009 the first XI football (soccer) team won the northern regional championship. Between 1969–78 rugby union was especially strong, despite competition from club rugby league outside the college, with the first XV twice being runner-up in the senior A competition. In 2018 the 1st XV competed in the Auckland 1A Competition. Over the years the college has produced five rugby league Kiwis (internationals) and numerous professional rugby league players. (The former principal, Iva Ropati, is also a former professional rugby league footballer who played for New Zealand.)

== Weekend programmes ==
The Auckland Japanese Supplementary School (AJSS; オークランド日本語補習学校 Ōkurando Nihongo Hoshūgakkō), a Japanese supplementary school, holds its classes at One Tree Hill College.

== Principals ==
- Ronald Sydney Stacey 1955–1968
- Murray Print 1969–1977
- John Bradshaw Rose 1978–1986
- Ann Violet Dunphy 1986–1995 Co-principal 1995–1999
- John Good Co-principal 1995–1999
- Richard John Thornton 1999–2002
- Iva Lewis Ropati 2003–2009
- Nick Dynes Coughlan 2010–present

== Notable alumni ==
Past students who have excelled nationally or internationally, listed with their discipline or former discipline.

- Brad Butterworth – America's Cup yachtsman
- Keisha Castle-Hughes – actress
- Donna Chisholm – investigative journalist and author
- Brian Clark – rugby league player
- Tina Cross – singer, entertainer
- Murray Eade – rugby league player
- Iosefa Enari – opera singer
- Doug Gailey – rugby league player
- James George – novelist, short story writer, creative writing lecturer
- John Goulter – business leader
- Kim Harrison – singer-songwriter
- Carol Hirschfeld – television reporter, producer
- Graeme Hunt – journalist, author, historian
- Brian Lee – rugby league
- David Liti – Commonwealth Games gold medalist in weightlifting
- Hutch Maiava – rugby league player
- Daniel Manu – rugby union player
- Ricky May – singer, entertainer
- Iafeta Paleaaesina – rugby league player
- Iain Sharp – poet, author
- Nina Sio – rugby union player
- Hilary Timmins – television personality
- Dave Witteveen – All White footballer
- Paea Wolfgramm – boxer
- Michael Soeoth – Indonesian footballer
