= Bunny Walters =

- Born: Bunny Te Kokiri Miha Waahi Walters; 31 May 1953; Katikati, New Zealand
- Died: 14 December 2016 (aged 63) Hamilton, New Zealand
- Genre: Pop
- Occupation: Singer
- Instrument: Vocals
- Years active: 1969–1978
- Label: Impact

Bunny Te Kokiri Miha Waahi Walters (31 May 1953 – 14 December 2016) was a New Zealand singer who had a number of New Zealand hits during the 1970s. He is best known for the hits "Brandy" and "Take the Money and Run".

Walters represented New Zealand at the 1986 ABU Popular Song Contest and won with the song "Taken By Love".

== Background ==
Of Ngāi Te Rangi descent, Walters was born and raised in Katikati, a town in the North Island of New Zealand, between Tauranga and Waihi.

== Career ==
In 1969, he competed against Tui Fox at Joe Brown's at the Rotorua Soundshell during the Search for Stars event held there. Fox was singing similar material to Walters. Fox won the final with Walters coming in second. His first single, titled "Just Out of Reach", was released in 1969. He then released "It's Been Too Long" and "Can't Keep You Out of My Heart". During one of the talent quests, held at the Opera House in Palmerston North, he was beaten by singer Richard Turei, whose daughter Metiria Turei would later serve as co-leader of the Green Party in New Zealand.

Walters made his first television appearance on Happen-Inn, a New Zealand television show.

After performing at Expo 70 in Osaka, Japan, he received contracts to return to Japan. He gained considerable exposure. The New Zealand Herald reported that he may have also appeared on the Rolf Harris show in London.

In 1971, he replaced Vaughan Lawrence as the resident singer on Happen-Inn.

In 1972, he recorded "Brandy" (which reached No. 4 on the pop charts). It was reported in the edition of 4 May of The New Zealand Herald that due to the big success Walters had with "Brandy" that the song was to be produced in sheet music form. That same year he had a hit with Take The Money And Run" (which reached #2).

In 1973 he had a hit with "Home Isn't Home Anymore" (which reached #18). Also that year he had a gold disc entry with the Bernie Allen arranged "Helena", a Tat Meager composition also recorded that year by Leapy Lee.

=== 1974 ===
In 1974, Walters had a hit with a song originally recorded by Ben Thomas, written by Gary Sulsh, Stuart Leathwood, and Tony Macaulay. His version of "The Nearest Thing To Heaven", produced by Alan Galbraith reached No. 10 that year.

In June he had toured with the Supremes. Another singer from New Zealand, Erana Clark was announced earlier to be on the same tour with Walters. That year he won two awards at the RATA awards. One was for best male vocalist and the other for best recording artist.

Damage to career

In October 1974 he was convicted of possessing a very small amount of marijuana and fined convicted and fined $100 for possession. This had a catastrophic effect on his career. Prior to the conviction, he was always in demand. He was getting work, being hired to perform in pubs, clubs and for certain organisations. Then as a result of falling foul of influential people he was virtually blacklisted from TV and radio. He disappeared from the spotlight almost immediately.

=== Mid 70s onwards ===
In 1978, he recorded a promotional record for the New Zealand Labour Party. The single was titled "To Be Free with Labour" and was the B side of a song titled "To Be Free", written by Robinson-Bretnall.

During the 1980s he was also singing jingles and getting a lot of work in that area. According to an article in AudioCulture by Steven Shaw, The New Zealand Herald reported in August 1986 that 80% of the advertising jingles heard in New Zealand, featuring male and female voices were by Walters and singer Annie Crummer. Among these projects was a verse from a version of the New Zealand national anthem that was recorded for World Expo 88, which also aired during TVNZ's daily opening transmission during the late 1980s and early 1990s.

In June 1991, he was appearing on stage in a production of Porgy and Bess.

In 2013, Walters was the profile in episode 9 of The Untold Stories of New Zealand Music History.

== Film and television ==
Drama

Walters appeared in the 1978 film Skin Deep.

The song "Never Say Die" from single the "Never Say Die" / "Gotta Get Outta Here" WEA Records Limited Z10002 was composed and performed by Billy Kristian. It is featured during the closing credits of the 1988 film Never Say Die which starred Temuera Morrison and Lisa Eilbacher. He appeared in an episode of the New Zealand prime-time soap opera, Shortland Street.

== Ministry ==
Walters became a Christian in or around 1995/1997. In a 1999 interview, he told The Sunday Star-Times that his conversion came about as a result of a pastor inviting him to church. Because he didn't have much else going on, he was looking forward to attending. He was living in Queensland, Australia from around 2004, moving around before settling on one of the Islands in Queensland. While living in Queensland, the main amount of singing he did was in church. In his quest to evangelise, he was in Canada at one stage for a month. While there he preached to an Inuit community.

== Illness and death ==
Walters died in Waikato Hospital, Hamilton, on 14 December 2016 after a short illness.

=== Funeral service ===
He had been lying in state at Tokoroa's Papa o te Aroha Marae. The funeral service was at Elim Christian Church, with a private cremation to follow.

=== Tribute concert ===
It was announced in Stuff that a tribute concert for Walters was to be held at the Tokoroa Cosmopolitan Club on 4 February 2017. Artists scheduled to appear were Tom Sharplin, Dennis Marsh, Ray Solomon, Larry Morris, Dennis August and Craven Noble.

== Releases ==
Singles
Title	Release info	Year	Notes
"Just Out Of Reach" / "Crying Time"	Impact IR-1050	1969	
"It's Been Too Long" / "Through The Eyes Of Love"	Impact IR-1054	1970	
"Soft Rain" / "Danny Boy"	Impact IR-1071	1971	
"Brandy" / "Didn't We"	Impact IR-1073	1971	
"Can't Keep You Out of My Heart" / "I Believe"	Impact IR-1057	1971	
"I Won't Be Sorry To See Suzanne Again" / "Who Could Be Loving You"	Impact IR 1077	1972	
"Take The Money And Run" / Kiss Her Three Times"	Impact IR 1079	1972	Peaked at number 73 in Australia.
"Home Isn't Home Anymore" / "Quando Quando"	Impact IR 1080	1973	
"Helena" / "We'll Sing in the Sunshine"	Impact IR 1082	1973	
"The Nearest Thing To Heaven" / "The Songs We Sang Together"	Impact IR 1084	1974	
"Never Too Young To Rock" / "Boogie Woogie Woman"	Impact IR 1087	1976	
"Crazy" / "Help Me Out"	Impact IR 2000	1978	
"Born To Be Free" / "Didn't We"	EMI HR 582	1978	
"To Be Free" / "To Be Free With Labour"	NZLP PR 868	1978	New Zealand Labour Party promo single
"Never Say Die" / "Gotta Get Outta Here"	WEA Records Limited Z10002	1988	Side 1 Bunny Walters; Side 2 Jacqui Fitzgerald & Susan Lynch

EP
Title	Release info	Year	Tracks	Notes
Just Out Of Reach	Impact IR 402		A1. "Just Out Of Reach", A2. "Crying Time"; B1. "I Believe", B2. "Danny Boy	

Albums
Title	Release info	Year	Notes
Sings For Lovers And Rockers	Impact IMPS 108	1972	
The very best of Bunny Walters	EMI	2002	CD

Various artist compilation appearances
Title	Release info	Year	Track(s)	F	Notes
Loxene Golden Disc Award (Top Twelve)	Loxene Lox 1972	1972	"Take The Money And Run"	LP	
20 Golden Star Tracks	Music for Leisure 345		"Take The Money And Run"	LP	
20 Golden Rata Award Hits	Music for Leisure RATA 1	1973	"Helena"	LP	
20 Studio One Hits	Music for Leisure ST1	1974	"Natural Man"	LP	
20 Solid Gold Hits Volume 9	Music for Leisure SGH9	1974	"The Nearest Thing To Heaven"	LP	
New Zealand Gold Volume Two	His Master's Voice HITS 28	1977	"Brandy"	LP	
25 Years Of Kiwi Pop	EMI 435040 2	1992	"Brandy"	CD	
Kiwi Rock Vol. 3	EMI 4710582	1994	"Take The Money And Run"	CD	Discogs says 1995, photo of CD says 1994
Kiwi Classics, Vol. 2	EMI 4711112	1996	"Brandy"	CD	
Waiata : Maori Showbands, Balladeers & Pop Stars	His Master's Voice 50999 6802952 4 EMI – 50999 6802952	2011	"Brandy" "Take The Money & Run"	CD	
Waiata 2 : Maori Showbands, Balladeers & Pop Stars	EMI	2013	"The Nearest Thing To Heaven"	CD	
Kiwiana Goes Pop Vol. 2	Frenzy Music FRENZY 106	2013	"Uncles Burgers Ad"	CD	

== Film and television appearances ==
Television
Title	Episode	Date	Prod/Dir	Notes
Pop Co		Circa 1972/1974	David McPhail	
Koha	"Māori Musicians"	22 June 1986	Ernie Leonard	Other guests Richard Haeata and Mahinarangi Tocker
Koha		23 April 1989	Ernie Leonard	Other guests Mahinaarangi Tocker
Koha		6 August 1989	Ernie Leonard	Also features Moana Maniapoto-Jackson, Billy TK
Sir Howard Morrison: Time of My Life		1995	Michael Hockley	(1995 TV Special)
New Zealand: The Price of Fame		1999	Juliet Monaghan	Documentary
The Untold Stories Of New Zealand Music History	Episode 9	17 May 2013		

Film
Title	Role	Director	Year	Notes
Skin Deep	Himself	Geoff Steven	1978	
Never Say Die		Geoff Murphy	1988	Song "Never Say Die"
Channelling Baby	Himself	Christine Parker	1999	
