= Think of Me =

Think of Me may refer to:

- "Think of Me" (Andrew Lloyd Webber song), a song from the 1986 musical The Phantom of the Opera
- "Think of Me" (Buck Owens song), 1966
- "Think of Me" (Koo De Tah song), 1986
- "Think of Me" (The Veronicas song), 2019
- "Think of Me", by Mitch Zorn, 2025
- "Think of Me", by Sully Burrows from Somewhere in a Small Town, 2025
- Think of Me (film), a 1996 Cuban film
- "Think of Me", a song by Madonna from the 1983 album Madonna
- "Think of Me/No More Tears", a 2001 single by Namie Amuro
- "Think of Me", a song by Neil Young and Crazy Horse from Colorado, 2019
