= James George (writer) =

New Zealand writer (born 1962)

- Born: 1962 (age 63–64); Wellington, New Zealand
- Occupations: Novelist; short story writer; lecturer

Academic background
- Education: Auckland University of Technology (MCW)
- Thesis: Imaginary Westerns: An Exegesis to Sleepwalkers Songs (2015)
- Academic advisor: Paul Mountfort

Academic work
- Notable students: Kirsten Warner; Lauren Kim Roche; Maria Gill

James George (born 1962) is a New Zealand novelist, short story writer and creative writing lecturer. George has published three novels and several short stories, and lectures on creative writing at Auckland University of Technology.

== Life and career ==
George was born in Wellington in 1962, and has lived most of his life in Auckland. He attended Remuera Intermediate School and Penrose High School. He is of Ngāpuhi, English and Irish descent. In addition to his writing he has worked in the purchasing office of an Auckland machinery company.

George's first novel was Wooden Horses (2000), described by scholar Patrick Evans as "strongly romantic and lyrical". It was followed by his short story "Zeta Orionis", extracted from his then-unpublished second novel, which won the top award at the 2001 Māori Literature Awards (now the Pikihuia Awards), judged by Keri Hulme.

His second novel Hummingbird was published in 2003, and is about strangers who meet at a Ninety Mile Beach camping ground. It was shortlisted for the fiction prize at the Montana New Zealand Book Awards in 2004, and was a finalist for the 2005 Tasmania Pacific Fiction Prize. It was the May 2003 Book of the Month for Whitcoulls booksellers. Reviewer Margie Thomson in The New Zealand Herald called it "extraordinarily beautiful, thoughtful and moving", with a "slow, deliberate pace". The Dominion Post, by contrast, called it "an easy read but derivative", in a review which Fiona Kidman called "half-baked ramblings".

George's third novel, Ocean Roads (2006) was shortlisted for the 2007 Commonwealth Writers' Prize for the south-east Asia and south Pacific region, and shortlisted for the fiction prize at the 2007 Montana New Zealand Book Awards. Liam Davison, reviewing the novel for the Weekend Australian, described it as a "contemporary story of family secrets and the legacy of war ... informed by extensive research and an awareness that the grand public narratives we call history carry a raft of smaller, private tales with them". The Sydney Morning Herald said that George explores the "impact of war on several generations within one family", but that "he has so many issues and characters to keep up with that this fractured work never settles into its stride".

In 2006 George toured France with eleven other New Zealand writers as part of Les Belles Étrangères, a French literary festival. In 2007 he held the Buddle Findlay Sargeson Fellowship, which included a $40,000 grant allowing him to write full-time for the year.

George's short stories have been published in anthologies including The Best of New Zealand Fiction (volumes 1 and 3, 2004 and 2006), and Get on the Waka – Best Recent Maori Fiction (edited by Witi Ihimaera, 2007). In 2016 his short story "Moontide" was included as one of twenty stories in Stories on the Four Winds: Ngā Hau e Whā edited by Brian and Robyn Bargh; Landfall highlighted his story as "the standout 24-carat gem" of the anthology, with its "craftily crafted construct and subsequent maintenance of suspense".

In 2014 George earned a master's degree in creative writing at Auckland University of Technology (AUT). He lectures on creative writing in both the undergraduate and postgraduate creative writing programmes at AUT, previously taught the creative writing certificate at Waiariki Institute of Technology, and has run other writers' workshops at Unitec and at the Kāpiti Writers' Retreat. In 2015 he served as the chair of Toi Māori Aotearoa, and in 2019 he was on the judging panel for the top prize at the Ockham New Zealand Book Awards.

== Selected works ==
- Wooden Horses (Hazard Press, 2000)
- Hummingbird (Huia Publishers, 2003)
- Ocean Roads (Huia Publishers, 2006)
