= Take the Money and Run (Bunny Walters song) =

"Take The Money And Run"

Single by Bunny Walters
- B-side: "Kiss Her Three Times"
- Released: 1972
- Genre: Pop
- Length: 3:38
- Label: Impact
- Songwriters: J. Stephens, J. Carter
- Producer: Bernie Allen

Bunny Walters singles chronology
""I Won't Be Sorry To See Suzanne Again""	"Take The Money And Run"	""Home Isn't Home Anymore""

"Take The Money And Run" was a hit single in New Zealand for singer Bunny Walters, reaching no. 2 in 1972.

== Background ==
It was written by Geoff Stephens and John Carter. The recording was produced by Bernie Allen and featured The Yandall Sisters on backing vocals.

The song is about a man, quite possibly an unappealing who man has worked in a Santa Fe bank for 20 years. He has fallen for a wealthy rancher's wife who is used to living in luxury. Unfortunately this woman has devious motives. She tells him to prove his manhood by stealing the payroll intended for the railroad gang. Manipulated by her, he obeys her request and steals the money. Sadly he meets a tragic end before he can go with her to Mexico. With his dying breath, he still talks of his love for her and his mission.

=== New Zealand release ===
The song backed with "Kiss Her Three Times" was released on the Impact label, Cat no. IR 1079 in 1972. For the week ending 18 November 1972, Billboard recorded the N.Z. chart position of the song at no. 2, having moved from the previous week's position of no. 3. It finally settled at no. 2.

=== Australian release ===
In Australia, the song was released on the Image label, Cat IS-127. On 30 November, it was at no. 73 in Australia.

=== Remembered ===
In 2016, the song was quoted in the article "Rugby: Dagg's hot property overseas", which appeared in the 24 November edition of Hawke's Bay Today to describe a move in All Black Israel Dagg's rugby career.

== Other versions ==
Joe Dolan recorded his version backed with "Home Isn't Home Anymore". This one was released on the Pye 7N 45151 in June 1972. Dutch singer, Ben Cramer also recorded a version in 1976 as the B side of his single "Sorrow".
