= Home Isn't Home Anymore =

Single by Bunny Walters
- B-side: "Quando Quando"
- Released: 1973
- Genre: Pop
- Label: Impact IR 1080
- Songwriters: Mitch Murray, P. Callander
- Producer: Bernie Allen

Bunny Walters singles chronology
"Take The Money And Run"	"Home Isn't Home Anymore"	"Helena"

Home Isn't Home Anymore was a hit for Bunny Walters in 1973. It was his fourth top twenty single and followed "Take The Money And Run".

== Background ==
Having three other charting singles with the first being "Just Out of Reach", followed by "Brandy", and "Take The Money And Run", this was his fourth top twenty single. The song backed with "Quando Quando" was released on Impact IR 1080 in 1973. The recording was produced by Bernie Allen and featured The Yandall Sisters on backing vocals.

=== Chart history ===
On February 12, 1973, the single entered the New Zealand chart at no. 18. The final position of the song was no. 18.

== Earlier versions ==
The song had been recorded previously by Heathmore (UK, 1969), Joe Harris (Belgium, 1969), Inga Sulin (Finland, 1969, as "Tyhjä koti"), Rex Gildo (Germany 1969 as "Komm Doch Zu Mir"), Alan Garrity (South Africa, 1972), and Joe Dolan (UK, 1972).

South African singer Alan Garrity's version reached number five in his home nation and number two in Rhodesia during early 1973.
