= Give a Little Love =

Give a Little Love may refer to:

- "Give a Little Love" (Bay City Rollers song), 1975
- Give a Little Love (The Judds album), European title of the album Heartland, 1987
- "Give a Little Love" (The Judds song), 1988
- "Give a Little Love", by Albert Hammond and Albert West, covered by several artists, including Ziggy Marley and the Melody Makers
- "Give a Little Love", by Andrea Faustini from Kelly
- "Give a Little Love", by Golden Harvest from Golden Harvest
- "Give a Little Love", by Griffin House
- "Give a Little Love", by Jermaine Jackson from Precious Moments
- "Give a Little Love", by LeVert from Rope a Dope Style
- "Give a Little Love", by Marvin Gaye and Tammi Terrell from United
- "Give a Little Love", by Mr. President
- "Give a Little Love", by Noah and the Whale from Peaceful, the World Lays Me Down
- "Give a Little Love", by Rilo Kiley from Under the Blacklight
- "Give a Little Love", by Tom Jones
