= Impact Records (disambiguation) =

Impact Records is an American record label, once a subsidiary of MCA Records.

Impact Records may also refer to:

- Impact Records (California), a California-based label that released surf music in the 1960s
- Impact (record label), a New Zealand record label
- Impact Records, a Christian music label within Benson Records
