= Graeme Hunt =

New Zealand journalist (1952–2010)

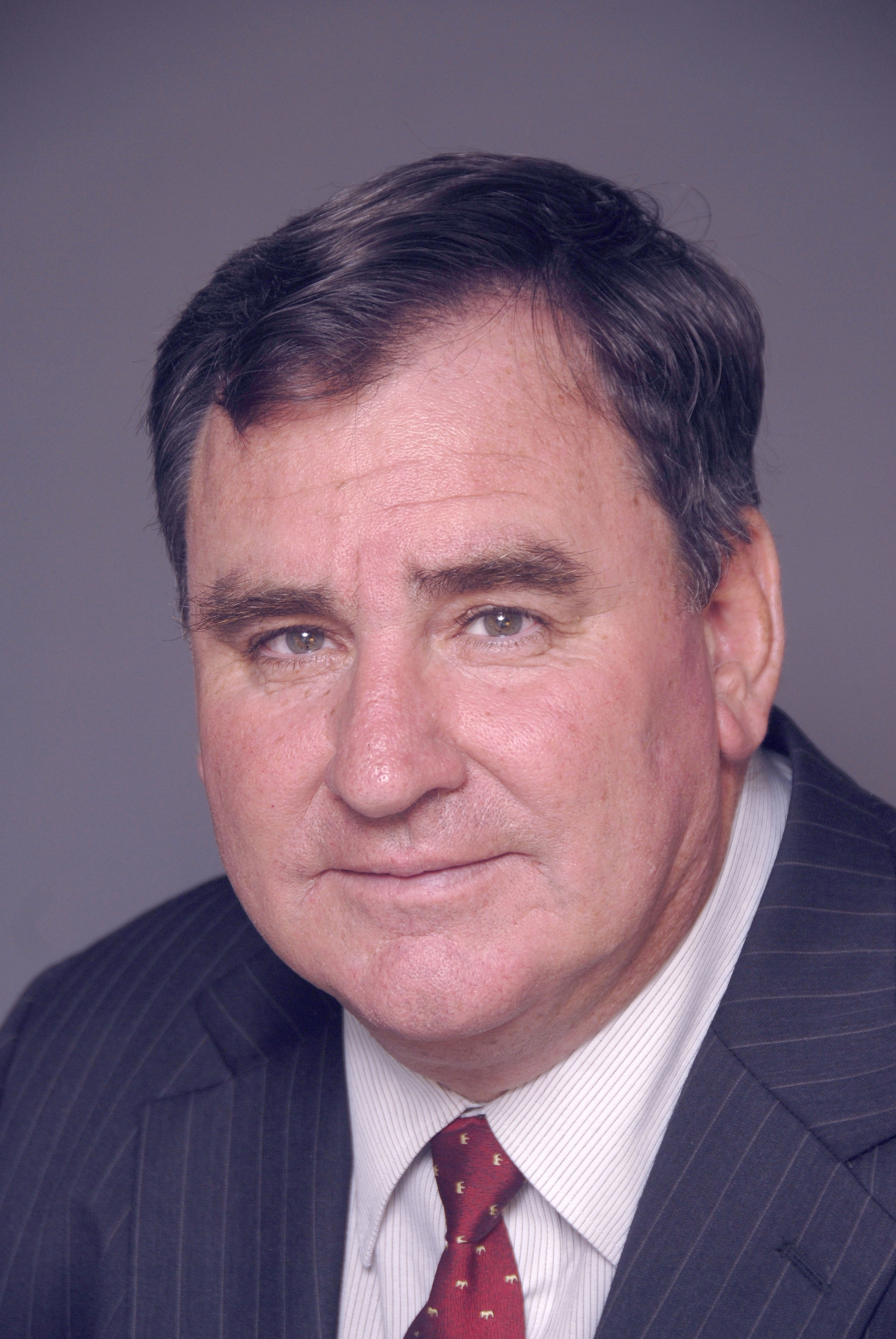
- Graeme John Hunt
- Born: Graeme John Hunt; 20 September 1952; Auckland, New Zealand
- Died: 22 September 2010 (aged 58); Auckland, New Zealand

Graeme John Hunt (20 September 1952 – 22 September 2010) was a New Zealand journalist, author and historian.

== Biography ==
Hunt was born in Auckland, New Zealand. He was the third of the five children of Frederick Phillip Hunt (1921–1982), a self-employed wire worker, and Beverley Nance Hunt (née Hatcher) (1926–2002), an accounts clerk. He attended Penrose High School (now One Tree Hill College) in Auckland.

Hunt, who initially trained as an accountant, was a journalist, author, and historian. He held a history degree and a business studies diploma from Massey University in Palmerston North, and attended Green College (now Green Templeton College), University of Oxford, England, in 2000 as a Chevening/David Low journalism fellow under the Reuters Foundation Programme.

Hunt was a former editor-at-large of the National Business Review, Auckland, and a former editor of that paper's annual Rich List. He was also a radio and television commentator on business and politics and wrote for a number of New Zealand publications including the New Zealand Listener, Management magazine, the New Zealand Herald, the Herald on Sunday and Metro.

== Interests ==
Hunt was deputy chairman of One Tree Hill College Board of Trustees, Auckland (his old school), and was formerly deputy chairman of Kelston Girls' College Board of Trustees, Auckland. He also served on the (New Zealand) Young Enterprise Trust Supporters' Council and undertook the research into, and helped select, laureates for the Fairfax Media New Zealand Business Hall of Fame.

He was a keen genealogist and published two books on his family history.

== Political involvement ==
In 1986 he sought the National Party nomination for the seat of Pakuranga ahead of the 1987 election.

Hunt was a critic of New Zealand's mixed-member proportional (MMP) voting system and campaigned for its abolition.

On 19 April 2010 Hunt announced he would be standing on the North Now ticket for the new Auckland Council. He died at his residence in Auckland before the elections were completed.

== Personal details ==
Hunt was married to Saluma (née Ioane), a human resources manager, originally from Niue. He fathered two children, a son and daughter, from a previous marriage.

== Works ==
Hunt's works included:

- Introduction to Sharemarket Investment, New Zealand Stock Exchange, Auckland, 1985, 1986, 1987
- Scandal at Cave Creek: A Shocking Failure in Public Accountability, Waddington Publications, Auckland, 1996
- Why MMP Must Go: The Case for Ditching the Electoral Disaster of the Century, Waddington Press, Auckland, 1998
- The Rich List: Wealth and Enterprise in New Zealand, Reed Books & Waddington Press, Auckland, 2000 & 2003
- Hustlers, Rogues & Bubble Boys: White-collar Mischief in New Zealand, Reed Books & Waddington Press, Auckland, 2001
- Black Prince: The Biography of Fintan Patrick Walsh, Penguin Books & Waddington Press, Auckland, 2004
- Centenary: 100 Years of State Insurance, IAG New Zealand, Auckland, 2005
- Rural Challenge: A History of Wrightson Ltd (with Hugh Stringleman, the primary author), Reed Books, 2006
- Spies and Revolutionaries: A History of New Zealand Subversion, Reed Books & Waddington Press, Auckland, 2009
- By Skill and Spirit: A History of the Auckland Officers' Club, Waddington Press, Auckland, 2009
- First to Care: 125 Years of the Order of St John in New Zealand,1885–2010, Libro International & Waddington Press, Auckland, 2009
- Pride and Passion: AECOM's 90 Years of Civil Engineering and Consultancy in New Zealand, 1919–2009, Waddington Press, Auckland, 2009.

Hunt wrote or edited several other books, including school and business histories.
