= John Goulter =

New Zealand businessman

Sir John Packard Goulter KNZM JP (born 8 August 1941) is a New Zealand business leader based in Northland. He is chairman of the commercial arm of Ngāpuhi, Ngapuhi Asset Holding Company, and was knighted for services to business and the community.

== Early life ==
Goulter was born in Auckland in 1941. He received his education at a number of primary schools (Manurewa, Parnell, Panmure, and Tamaki) and at Penrose High School. He married Judith Lorraine Ruddell in 1963, and the couple had three children. His wife died in 1981, and in 1983 he married Bronwen Iva Shepherd. He later married Elaine (Karen) Goulter.

== Career ==
Goulter's career spans almost 50 years, including 15 years as the inaugural chief executive and then managing director of Auckland International Airport Limited. He has chaired the New Zealand Lotteries Commission and United Carriers Group in Whangārei. He is currently chair of the NZ Business and Parliament Trust, Paraparaumu Airport, the Reserve Bank, and a director of TVNZ.

Goulter started his management career in Taitokerau with Ceramco.

Goulter contested the mayoralty in the Far North District in the 2010 local elections. He came a close second to Wayne Brown.

== Honours and awards ==
In 2003, Goulter was inducted into the New Zealand Business Hall of Fame. In the 2004 New Year Honours, he was appointed a Distinguished Companion of the New Zealand Order of Merit for services to business and the community. Following the restoration of titular honours by the New Zealand government to the New Zealand Royal Honours System, Goulter accepted re-designation as a Knight Companion in the 2009 Special Honours. He is a Fellow of the New Zealand Institute of Management.
