= M'Lady (Steve Karliski song) =

"The Pain Goes On Forever"

Single by John Rowles
- A-side: "M'Lady"
- B-side: "Say Goodbye"
- Released: 1968
- Genre: pop
- Length: 3:13
- Label: CBS BA 461218
- Songwriter(s): Karlinski
- Producer(s): Mike Leander

John Rowles singles chronology
"The Pain Goes On Forever" (1968)	"The Pain Goes On Forever" (1968)	"One Day" (1969)

M'Lady was a hit for John Rowles. Following the success he had in New Zealand with "The Pain Goes On Forever", M'Lady became a New Zealand chart tropper.

== Background ==
"M’Lady" was a New Zealand release for John Rowles and was released while he was on tour there. He told an Auckland DJ that it was his best up-tempo song to date. For the week ending April 19, 1969, the song entered the New Zealand Top Ten at #10. The following week it had moved up one notch to #9. The song eventually went to the top of the NZ charts.
