= The Pain Goes On Forever =

Single by John Rowles
- A-side: "The Pain Goes On Forever"
- B-side: "All My Love's Laughter"
- Released: 1968
- Recorded: 1968
- Genre: pop
- Length: 3:20
- Label: CBS BA 461211
- Songwriter(s): Savio, Califano, Ingrosso, Leander
- Producer(s): Mike Leander

John Rowles singles chronology
"Hush ... Not A Word To Mary" (1968)	"The Pain Goes On Forever" (1968)	"M'Lady" (1968)
- UK discography * NZ Discography **

The Pain Goes On Forever was a New Zealand hit for John Rowles. It was the follow-up to his second hit, Hush Not A Word To Mary.

== Background ==
The song was released on CBS BA 461211 in September 1968. It was written by Luigi Ingrosso, Gaetano Savio, and Franco Califano. Mike Leander is also credited in the composition as well as the arrangement and production. The B side "All My Loves Laughter" was written by Jimmy Webb and was also arranged and produced by Leander.

The song didn't chart in the UK, and Rowles wouldn't have another hit there. It was a hit in New Zealand and by February 28, 1969, it was at #2 on The N.Z. Hit Parade.
