= Erana Clark =

Australian singer (1959–2024)

- Born: 18 December 1959; Auckland, New Zealand
- Origin: Auckland, New Zealand
- Died: 20 December 2024 (aged 65) Sydney, Australia
- Genres: R&B, pop, jazz
- Occupations: Musician, vocal coach
- Instrument: vocals
- Years active: 1971–2024
- Label: Impact

Erana Clark (18 December 1959 - 20 December 2024) was an Australian singer, songwriter and vocal coach originally from Auckland, New Zealand.

== Background ==
Her work as a vocal coach started with Popstars. Then she spent seven years with Australian Idol. She also coached for X-Factor, then later worked on Australia's Got Talent. She is now recognised for her vocal coaching. She also had some charting singles on Lew Pryme and Russell Clark's Impact label.

== Career ==
=== 1970s to 1980s ===
In 1973, at the age of 12 with her song "Circle Game" she was a finalist for RATA Awards. It was released on Impact, backed with "Teardrop On Teardrop". The following year she recorded two more singles for the label: "I Have A Dream" backed with "My Friend The Sea" and "Angel Eyes" bw "The Rivers Too Wide". By the age of 21 she was a veteran performer. Having been a teenager and being exposed to an adult lifestyle, it took its toll on her.

=== 1990s ===
One of the artists she worked with during the 1990s was jazz pianist Judy Bailey. She sang on her 1993 album Sundial. She provided backing vocals for Marcia Hines's album Right Here and Now, released in 1994. She sang the track "Falling In Love" which was on the 1994 album Ain't It Funky by Craig Calhoun & The Brothers Of Oz. Along with Chrissy May and Rod McCormack, she provided backing vocals on a Gina Jeffreys track, "Away In A Manger" which was on The Spirit Of Christmas '96 album. Another artist she provided backing vocals for was Christian Fry on "When I'm With You", which appears on his EP album, released in 1999.

=== Later years ===
In 2010, along with The Blaine Whittaker band she appeared at the Kiama Jazz and Blues Festival. She co-wrote Jack Vidgen's single "Yes I Am" which spent two weeks on the Australian charts, peaking at #5.

== Coaching ==
She is recognised for her coaching abilities. According to an article in Christian Woman, she is a vocal coach. An article in The Daily Telegraph, written in 2015 said that she had cornered the market, coaching for shows such as Australian Idol, X-Factor, and Australia's Got Talent.

Clark's coaching has even led her to work with the Australian police in a PCYC scheme, held in Liverpool, Sydney around 2013. One of the singers she has coached was a young Australian jazz zinger Ella-Jane Sharpe who in 2016 received a $26,000 scholarship for Boston's Berklee College of Music.

== Death ==
She died at her home in Sydney, Australia on 20 December 2024 aged 65.

== Discography ==
Singles
Title	Release info	Year	Notes
"Circle Game" / "Teardrop On Teardrop"	Impact IR 1081	1973	
"I Have A Dream " / "My Friend The Sea"	Impact IR 1085	1974	From the N.Z.B.C. Television Show "Sing"
"Angel Eyes" / "The Rivers Too Wide"	Impact IR 1086	1974	

Various artist compilation appearances
Title	Release info	Year	Track(s)	F	Notes
20 Golden Rata Award Hits	Music for Leisure RATA 1	1973	"Circle Game"	LP	
Innovations	K-Tel INN 1		"It's My Party"	LP	
Waiata 2 : Maori Showbands, Balladeers & Pop Stars	EMI	2013	"Angel Eyes"	2013	
