= Hush ... Not a Word to Mary =

Single by John Rowles
- B-side: "The Night We Called It a Day"
- Released: 1968
- Recorded: 1968
- Genre: Pop
- Length: 3:20
- Label: MCA MU 1023
- Songwriters: Mitch Murray, Peter Callander
- Producer: Mike Leander

John Rowles singles chronology
"If I Only Had Time" (1968)	"Hush ... Not a Word to Mary" (1968)	"The Pain Goes On Forever" (1968)
- UK discography * NZ Discography **

"Hush ... Not a Word to Mary" was the second UK hit for New Zealand singer John Rowles. It was the follow-up release to his major hit "If I Only Had Time".

== Background ==
The song was written by Mitch Murray and Peter Callander. Mike Leander was the producer and arranger. The B-side "The Night We Called It a Day" was written by Rowles and Steve Kipner. It was published by Intune, which was the new publishing company for Murray and Callender. By July 6, the single shot up 18 places from #36 to #18. By July 13, 1968, the single had moved from its previous position of #18 to #12. This single also marked the last of Rowles' chart success in the UK.
