= Alan Garrity =

Singer songwriter

- Born: October 14, 1947 (age 78); Manchester, England
- Instruments: Piano, Guitar

Alan Garrity is a musician who had a number of hits in South Africa and Rhodesia.

He had his first hit with Put Your Hand in the Hand which was No 1 on the Springbok Top 20 chart for four weeks in 1971. This was followed up by I Need Someone which reached No 2 on Springbok Top 20 and spent 33 weeks on the charts and won the 1972 South African Recording Industry (SARI) Award for Best Song of the Year. In 1973, he won SARI awards for Best Album of the Year and Best Male Vocalist. His next single, a cover of Home Isn't Home Anymore, reached no 5 on the charts.

In 1975 he won a second SARI Award for Best Male Vocalist and his third in 1981 along with a SARI for Top Twenty Artist of the Year.

== Discography ==
=== Singles ===
- "Put Your Hand in the Hand" (1971) - (South Africa #1)
- "The Dream Waltz" (1971)
- "Somehow, Somewhere" (1971)
- "I Need Someone" (1971)
- "Till The Rivers All Run Dry" (1972)
- "Home Isn't Home Anymore" (1972)
- "I’ll Have To Dream" (1973)
- "Goodbye Mama" (1973)
- "She’s My Woman" (1975)
- "Sunshine In My World" (1976)
- "You’re Losing Me" (1980)
- "Santa Maria" (1981)
- Oh Louisa
- Christmas At Home
- A love Like That
- You Stood By Me
- Give me back My Woman

=== Albums ===
- Put Your Hand In The Hand (1971)
- I Need Someone (1972)
- Words and Music (1975)
- The World of Alan Garrity
- Feelings
- A Song for you
- A winters Tale. Recorded in the UK
- Christmas with Alan Garrity
- tracks on Numerous compilation Albums.
- Best Of Alan Garrity
- Beach House in the Blue Mountains (with Jurie Els) Universal Music 2013
