= Pacific Song Contest =

International song contest

- Genre: Music competition
- Based on: Eurovision Song Contest

The Pacific Song Contest was an international song contest modeled on the Eurovision Song Contest, held from 1978 to 1980. It invited broadcasters from countries around the Pacific Rim to participate, with the aim of bringing those countries closer together, similar to the Eurovision Song Contest Asia.

It was organised by Television One, New Zealand's primary television broadcaster, to be an annual entertainment event hosted by up to twelve countries around the Pacific Rim, including Australia, Canada, Japan, Mexico, the Philippines and the United States. Due to the time differences, the contest was not broadcast simultaneously in all countries, but instead recorded and broadcast at a later date in more distant countries.

The voting process was similar to that of the more famous Eurovision Song Contest. Juries from each country gave 10, 8, 6, 4, 2 and 1 point(s) to the songs ranked 1st through 6th, and could not give points to their own country's entry.

Through the contest's existence, nine countries would participate at least once. Each contest lasted an hour.

The contest ran for three editions. A fourth was never held, although Australia had the option to host it.

== 1978 ==
The first contest was organised by South Pacific Television and Radio New Zealand with a budget of NZD100,000. It was held in the Christchurch Town Hall on 5 October 1978 and hosted by Peter Sinclair. Seven countries competed, after the Philippines withdrew due to not satisfying the entry requirements.

The interval act was Ray Woolf and the New Zealand Ballet performing "Hit Record".

Pacific Song Contest 1978 Participants
Country	Artist	Song	Points	Place
Japan	Shigeru Matsuzaki	"You Are Gone"	46	1
New Zealand	Rob Guest	"Hangin' On"	40	2
South Korea	Hey Euhney	"Only You Eternally"	39	3
Hong Kong	Margaret Miao	"We'll Be in Love"	28	4
United States	Tim Moore	"It Could Happen Tonight"	23	5
Canada	Gloria Kaye	"Just To Be Alone With You"	21	6
Australia	Linda Keene	"Why Did You Take My Love"	20	7

== 1979 ==
As in 1978, the contest was held in the Christchurch Town Hall, on 18 October 1979, and hosted by John Hayden. Seven countries competed again, with the Philippines debuting and the United States withdrawing due to lacking an interested broadcaster.

Pacific Song Contest 1979 Participants
R/O	Country	Artist	Song	Points	Place
1	Australia	Leon Berger	"If We Could Go Right Back Again"	48	2
2	Canada	Arlene Duncan	"For I Could Love You"	32	3
3	Hong Kong	Amy Chan	"The Wandering Song"	17	7
4	Philippines	Basil Valdez	"Today"	21	6
5	South Korea	See-Jin Lee	"Yesterday, Today, Tomorrow"	23	5
6	New Zealand	Tina Cross	"Nothing but Dreams"	50	1
7	Japan	Hiromi Iwasaki	"The Kaleidoscope of Life"	26	4

== 1980 ==
The contest moved to Ottawa in Canada, held in the National Arts Centre on 27 September 1980, and hosted by Gloria Kaye and Arlene Duncan, Canada's previous representatives. Eight countries competed, with Mexico debuting and the United States returning.

Pacific Song Contest 1980 Participants
Country	Artist	Song	Points	Place
Australia	Brenda Kristen & Mark Williams	"A Life of our Own"	49	1
New Zealand	Tina Cross & Derek Metzger	"Once Again with You"	47	2
Philippines	Duncan & Kaye	"We are the People"	45	3
Canada	Peter Pringle	"When You Say Goodbye"	43	4
United States	Norman Saleet	"Hang On In"	Unknown	Unknown
South Korea	Tae Wha Kim	"I've Lived like a Fool"	Unknown	Unknown
Mexico	Olga Maria	"Let's Enjoy this Beautiful Day"	Unknown	Unknown
Hong Kong	Theresa Cheung	"Forsaken Love"	Unknown	Unknown
