= Impact (record label) =

Impact Records
- Founded: 1966
- Founder: Lew Pryme, Russell Clark
- Status: defunct
- Country of origin: New Zealand

Impact was a New Zealand record label which released records by, among others, Erana Clark, Ray Columbus, Allison Durbin, Gerry Merito, Lew Pryme, Bunny Walters, Ray Woolf, Larry's Rebels and Golden Harvest. The label started releasing records in 1966 and continued throughout the 1970s.

== Background ==
The idea of the label was conceived by Russell Clark while he was still at school. It was founded in 1966 by Clark and Benny Levin. Ray Columbus, who had just left Zodiac Records, was the first artist to be signed. According to the edition of 1 January 1966 of Billboard, after Columbus, two other acts were to have releases. They were the group Larry's Rebels and the singer Gerry Merito. One of the artists it would have a lot of success with was Bunny Walters. Walters who had 12 singles released on the label had 5 charting hits with the label, the last being "The Nearest Thing To Heaven which made #10 in 1974.
