= Lew Pryme =

New Zealand pop singer and rugby union footballer (1940–1990)

Lewis Pryme (/prim/: 1940 – 23 April 1990) was a New Zealand pop singer and rugby director, and player.

== Biography ==
Pryme was born in the coastal Taranaki town of Waitara, where the primary form of employment was the Borthwick's Freezing Works. He worked his way up the entertainment world ladder starting with Colin King's rock and roll band, the Harmonisers.

He started to become widely known as a pop singer in the mid-sixties, after winning supporting slots for NZ tours by Britpop groups The Dave Clark Five and Herman's Hermits.

His notable songs included "Come On" (1966), "A Star Is Born" (1966), "Gracious Lady Alice Dee" (1968), "What's He Got That I Ain't Got", "There's A Kind Of Hush" (1968), "Fantastic Fergie", "Deck Of Cards" (1969), and "Welcome To My World" (1970).

He later set up his own agency to represent New Zealand artists in the music scene, ‘discovering' and representing many new talents including future successes Tina Cross, Rob Guest, Derek Metzger and Mark Williams.

In 1985 Pryme was appointed Executive Director of the Auckland Rugby Union.

Later in life, Pryme opened up about living as a closeted gay man.

Pryme died of AIDS on 23 April 1990, a week after his partner of many years Jeff Fowler also died of AIDS on 16 April 1990, aged 32. His last days were recorded in a documentary, Lew Pryme -- Welcome to my World.
