= Une belle histoire =

- 7" vinyl single cover

Single by Michel Fugain & Le Big Bazar

from the album Fugain et le Big Bazar
- Language: French
- Released: 1972
- Length: 3:16
- Label: CBS Records
- Composer: Michel Fugain
- Lyricist: Pierre Delanoë

Michel Fugain singles chronology
"Les rues de la grande ville" (1971)	"Une belle histoire" (1972)	"Fais comme l'oiseau" (1972)

"Une belle histoire" (pronounced [yn(ə) bɛl istwaʁ]; "A beautiful story") is a French song written by Michel Fugain (music) and Pierre Delanoë (lyrics). Featured on the 1972 album Fugain et le Big Bazar, it was released as a single that same year, selling over 800,000 copies and topping the charts in France.

The lyrics, telling of a brief encounter between two young strangers ("they hid in a large wheat field and let the currents carry them away"), were considered risqué at the time. Fugain initially imagined the action to take place along U.S. Route 66, but Delanoë relocated the story in France.

"Une belle histoire" has been covered in a variety of languages. In 1972, Franco Califano wrote an Italian version of the song named "Un'estate fa" ("One summer ago"), which was first released as a single by the band Homo Sapiens. In 1973, it was recorded in Dutch as "Zoals een mooi verhaal" ("Like a beautiful story") by Ann Christy and in Turkish as "Kim ayırdı sevenleri" ("Who set the lovers apart?") by Tanju Okan, Nilüfer and the Modern Folk Üçlüsü. In 1974, It was recorded in English as "One Lovely Day" by Jay & The October Cherries, and in Spanish by Mayra Martí as "Una bella historia". In 1978, Japanese chorus group Circus (サーカス) covered this song as Mr. Summer Time (Mr.サマータイム) and topped in Japan.
