= Michael Soeoth =

Indonesian footballer

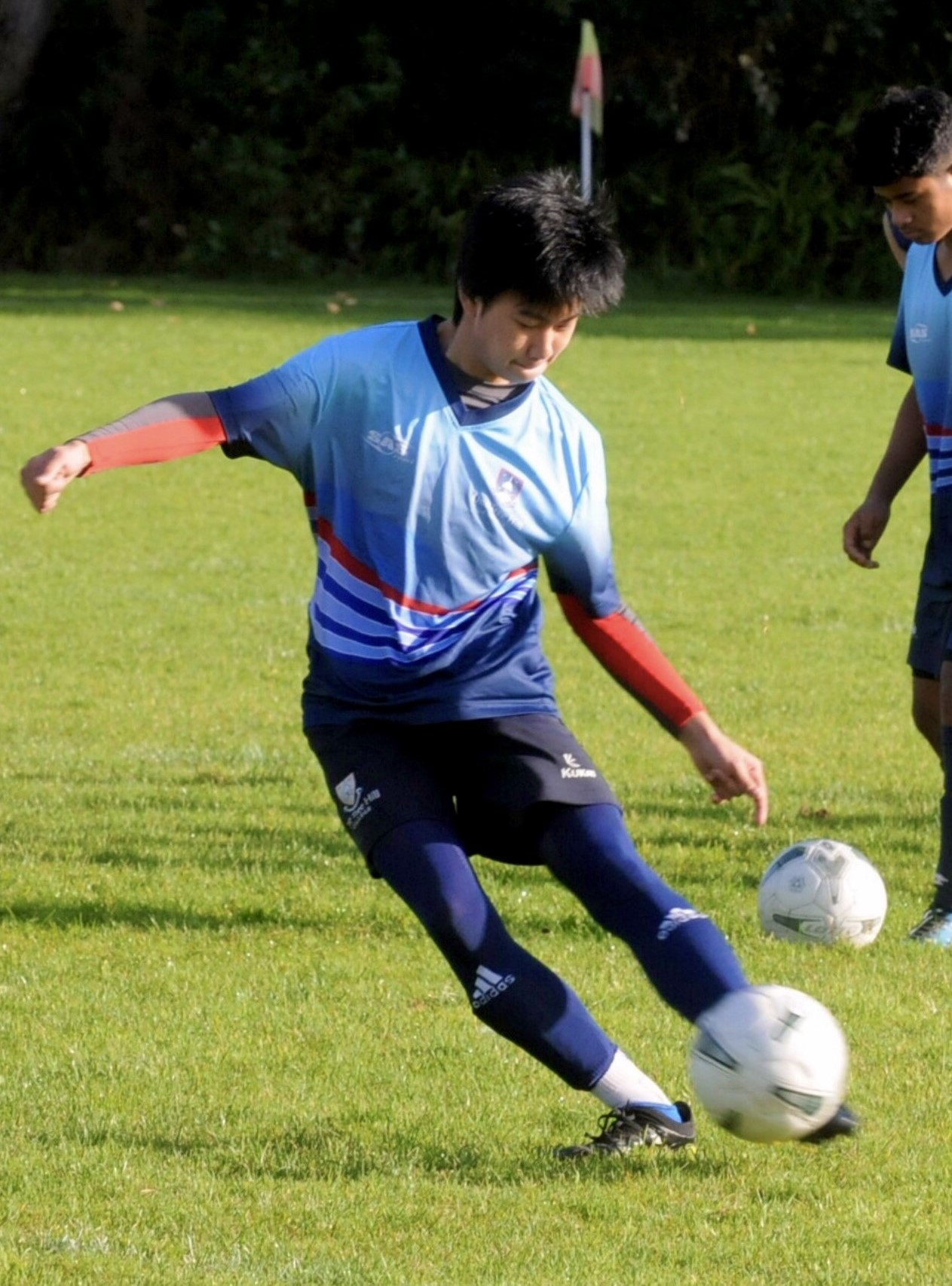
- Soeoth playing for One Tree Hill College in 2022

Personal information
- Full name: Michael Williams Soeoth
- Date of birth: 1 June 2007 (age 19)
- Place of birth: Manado, Indonesia
- Height: 1.75 m (5 ft 9 in)
- Position: Left-back

Team information
- Current team: Eastern Suburbs

Youth career
- Years: Team
- 2021–2022: Ellerslie AFC
- 2024–: Eastern Suburbs

Michael Williams Soeoth (born 1 June 2007) is an Indonesian footballer who plays fullback for New Zealand club Eastern Suburbs. He is an Indonesian diaspora/abroad player.

== Early life ==
Michael Soeoth was born in Manado, North Sulawesi. He lived in Manado with his grandparents for 9 years before moving to New Zealand in 2016 to live with his parents. Soeoth is the son of Billy Soeoth and Sandra Tuju who is from the Minahasan Regency. Soeoth is a teenager from Manado who attended One Tree Hill College and has a career abroad playing football in Auckland and someday hopes to become a national team player for the Indonesia national football team.

Soeoth is being monitored with playing overseas and in the database of Ministry of the Youth and Sport of Republic of Indonesia.

Soeoth has gained recognition on local news outlets in Manado and on social media platforms for his football career outside of Indonesia and being an Indonesian holding Indonesian citizenship.

Before pursuing a career in football, Soeoth had desires to play badminton for Indonesia as a kid. Soeoth in fact won a gold medal in the College Sport Auckland badminton tournament when playing for his school.

== Club career ==
Soeoth attended an open trial where he was selected to play for the Under 14 and Under 15 Ellersie AFC team during the 2021–2022 season. In 2021 Soeoth was the top goal scorer for his Under 14 team.

Soeoth played for Eastern Suburbs 17th Grade Academy team in 2024 then was promoted to play for Eastern Suburbs 19th Grade Academy team in 2025 . Soeoth was selected to play for Eastern Suburbs after attending one training session. From there, Soeoth played his first season with Eastern Suburbs that competed in the NRF Youth U17 Championship. Michael Soeoth became the first Indonesian and Manadonese player to play for Eastern Suburbs.

Soeoth still currently plays for Eastern Suburbs U19 grade in NRF.

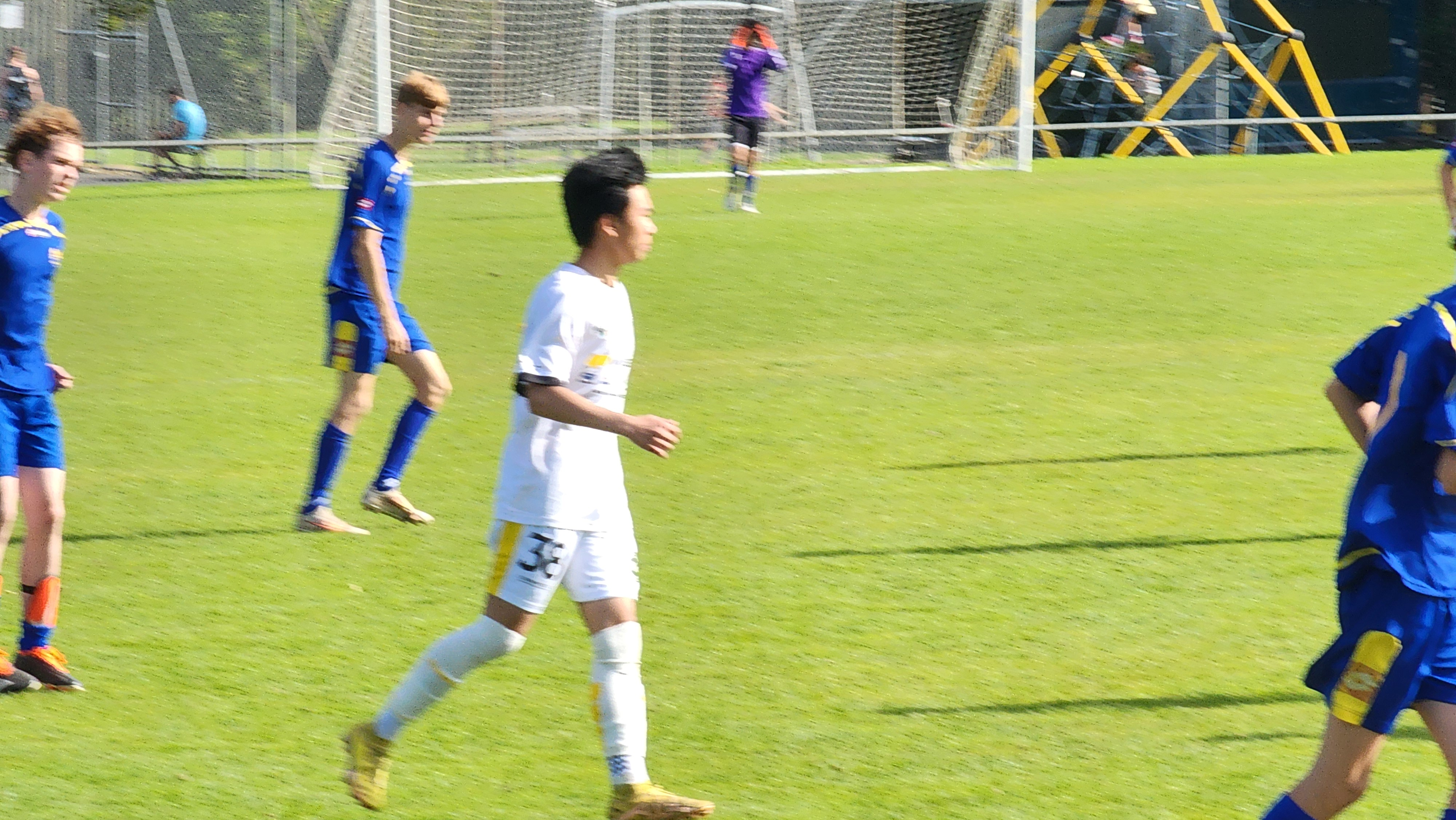
Michael Soeoth with Eastern Suburbs 17th Grade Academy

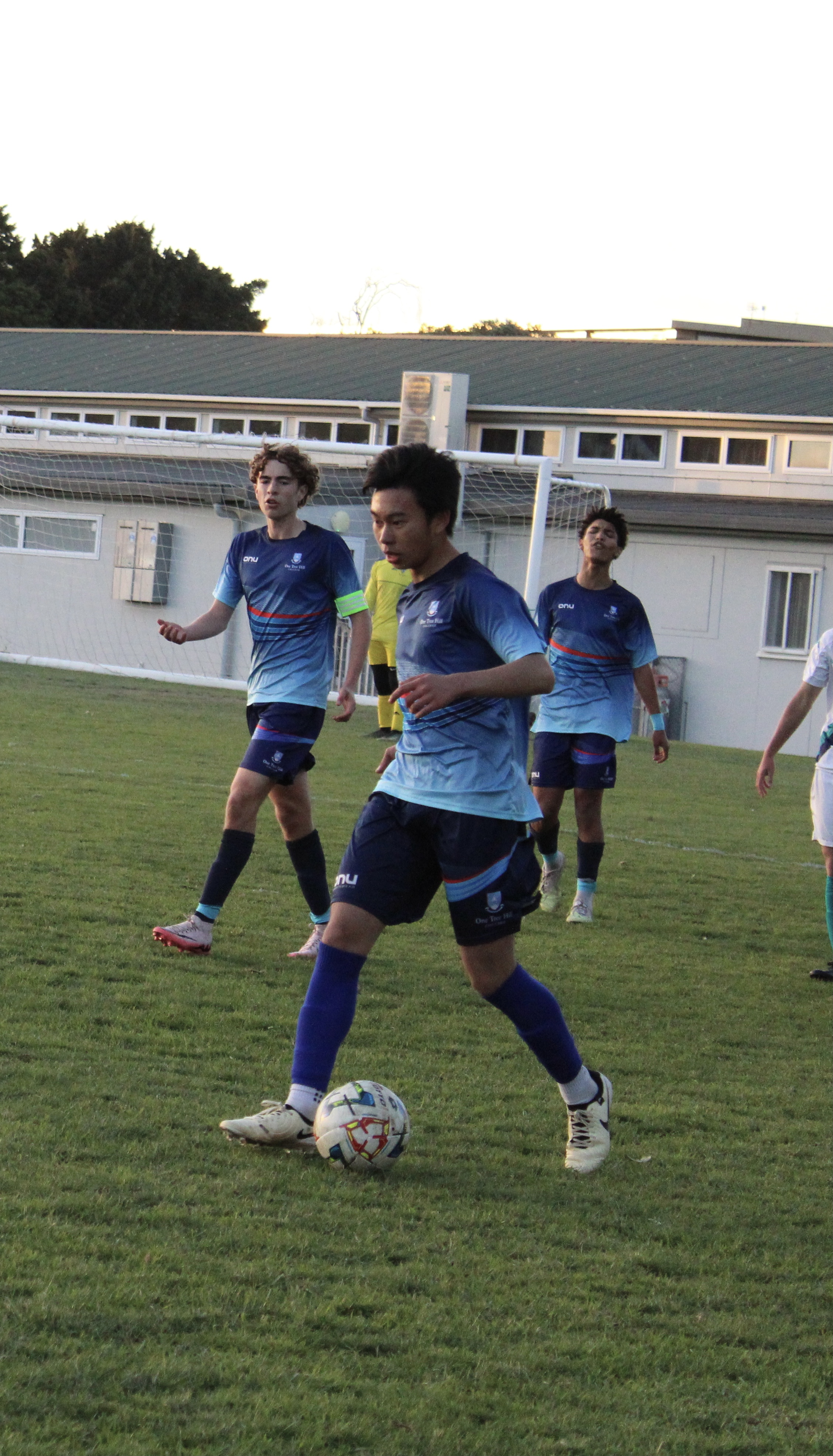
Michael Soeoth with One Tree Hill College 1st XI

Soeoth also has been playing football for a school team in New Zealand with One Tree Hill College since 2021. Soeoth was successfully selected through a selection process to play for the school football junior academy team when he was 13 years old. In 2022 Soeoth won the 14B East in College Sport Auckland tournament with the One Tree Hill College junior academy. In 2023, Soeoth was selected to be part of One Tree Hill College 1st XI senior team that played in the A4 of College Sport Auckland division. In 2024 Soeoth was part of the One Tree Hill College 1st XI senior team that went undefeated for 9 games straight in all of College Sport Auckland division until the undefeated streak ended after losing 4–0 in the last seasonal game and missing out on A3 promotion.

During his football career overseas in New Zealand, Soeoth has worked with coaches such as Ben Fletcher at Ellerslie AFC. He also has been coached by Dylan Manickum, Adam Thomas, Francis De Vries, Luis Toomey and Noah Billingsley with school football. These coaches that Soeoth has worked with has all played at a professional level and have played for the New Zealand national football team.

Soeoth is coached by Zach Haydon at Eastern Suburbs who was a New Zealand national football team staff.

== Style of play ==
Predominantly a left-back, Soeoth is a left foot football player who usually likes to whip in crosses from the left flank for the players to attack. He has mastered different ranges of passing and techniques for a fullback.
