= Koo De Tah =

1980s Australian pop music band

- Origin: Sydney, Australia
- Genres: Synthpop, new wave
- Years active: 1984–1987
- Label: Mercury Records
- Past members: Tina Cross; Leon Berger; Peter Radnai; John Bettison; Capree Morris; Roger Faynes

Koo De Tah (also Koo Dé Tah or Koo Dee Tah) were an Australian pop music band. The core band members were New Zealander Tina Cross and Russian-Australian Leon Berger. The group were formed and based in Sydney, Australia.

== History ==
In the early 1980s, Cross, a successful singer in New Zealand moved to Australia. In 1984, she created Koo Dé Tah with Leon Berger. Berger was born in Russia and studied at the Moscow Conservatory of Music. He had moved to Australia in 1973 and released two albums.

In June 1985, Koo Dé Tah released their debut single, "Too Young for Promises", which reached Number six in the Australian singles charts and Number 48 in New Zealand singles charts. In November 1985, the group released "Body Talk", which peaked at number 27 on the Australian singles charts.

The band's self-titled debut album was released in September 1986 and peaked at number 54 on the Australian albums charts. The group parted ways shortly after.

== Personnel ==
- Tina Cross – vocals
- Leon Berger – keyboards, songwriting, production
- Peter Radnai – drums
- John Bettison – guitar, violin
- Capree Morris – keyboards
- Roger Faynes – bass

== Discography ==
=== Albums ===
Title	Album details	Peak chart positions
Title	Album details	AUS
Koo De Tah	Released: September 1986; Label: Mercury Records (830 267-2); Format: LP, cassette, CD	54

=== Singles ===
Year	Title	Peak chart positions		Album
Year	Title	AUS	NZ	Album
1985	"Too Young for Promises"	6	48	Koo De Tah
1985	"Body Talk"	27	–	Koo De Tah
1986	"Think of Me"	69	–	Koo De Tah
1986	"Missed You All Along"	–	–	Koo De Tah
