= Michel Fugain =

French singer and composer (born 1942)

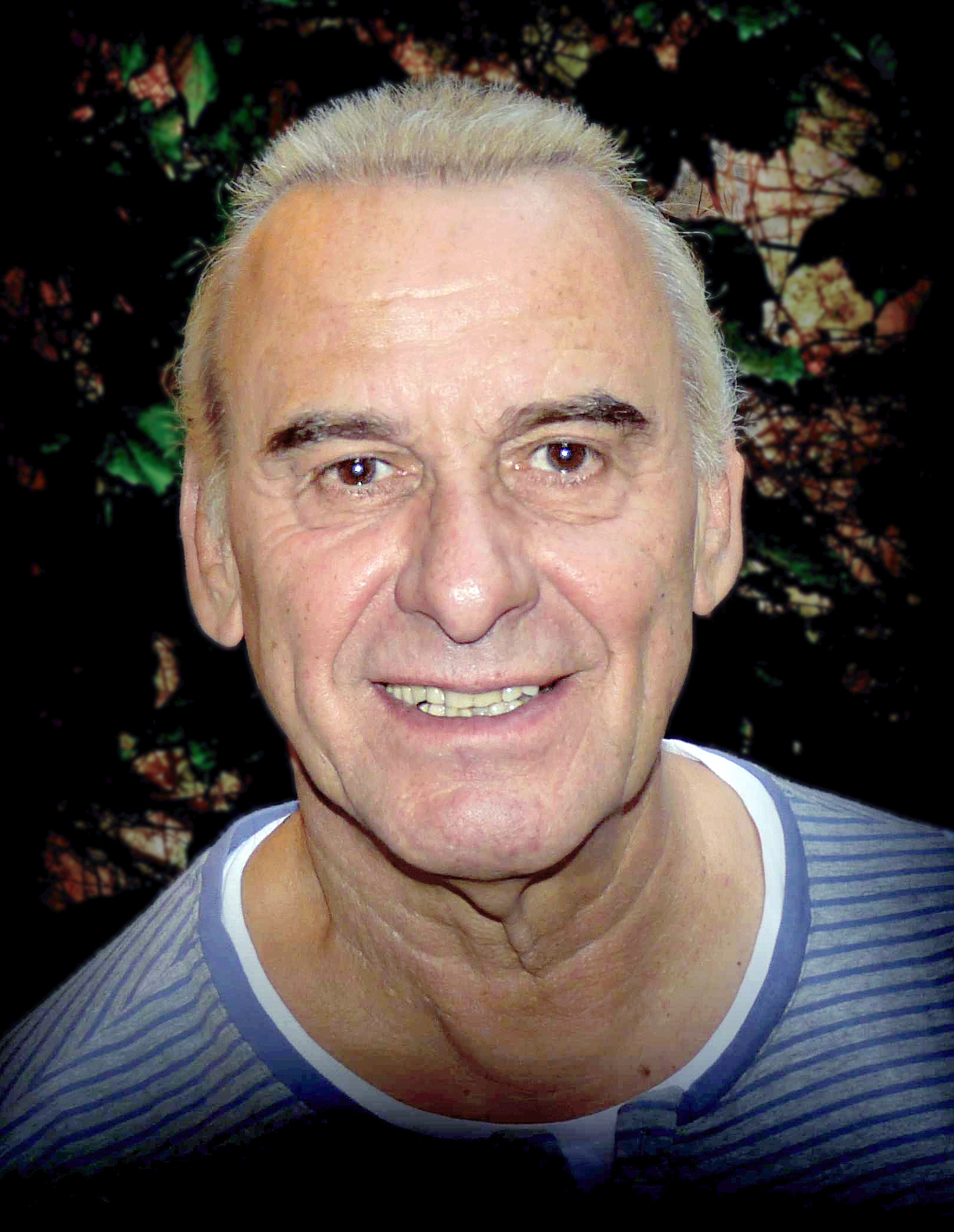

Background information
- Born: 12 May 1942 (age 84); Grenoble, Isère, France
- Genres: French variety songs, ballads
- Years active: 1965-present
- Labels: Barclay, Universal Records
- Website: michelfugain.com

Michel Fugain (French pronunciation: [miʃɛl fyɡɛ̃]; born 12 May 1942) is a French singer and composer. Fugain started composing after quitting medical school. He released his first album, Je n'aurai pas le temps, in 1967. The title track was later recorded in English by John Rowles as "If I Only Had Time". He formed a troupe of singers and dancers named Le Big Bazar in 1972. He has several hit songs in France, including "Une belle histoire," "Fais comme l’oiseau," "La Fête," "Bravo Monsieur le monde," "Les Acadiens," and "Le Printemps." He achieved success as a solo act, touring extensively and making regular appearances on radio and television shows dedicated to chanson and popular music between 1988 and 2002. His career went into a hiatus after the death of his daughter, but he resumed his career in 2005, and launched the project Pluribus in 2013.

Michel Fugain has sold ten million records over a fifty-year career. In 2025, he was awarded the rank of Commander of the Order of Arts and Letters.

== Biography ==
Born in Grenoble, Isère, the son of doctor and resistance fighter Pierre Fugain, Michel Fugain grew up in the Isère countryside before studying at the Lycée Champollion in Grenoble. Passionate about New Wave cinema, he abandoned his medical studies to become a filmmaker in Paris. Starting in 1963, he became an assistant director to Jean-Michel Barjol, Guy Blanc, Yves Robert, and Jean Delannoy, and then took drama classes with Yves Furet. It was there that he met Michel Sardou, for whom he composed his first songs.

In 1965, Michel Fugain signed a publishing contract with Barclay and wrote melodies for Hugues Aufray, Marie Laforêt, and Dalida. He achieved his first success in 1967 with "Je n'aurai pas le temps" (I Will Not Have Time), based on lyrics by Pierre Delanoë, for the Festival record label. At the same time, he directed, with Pierre Sisser, a television musical entitled A Child in the City in 1971.

In 1971, Michel Fugain created the Big Bazar, a troupe of singers and dancers dressed in loose, colorful clothing, and driven by the post-1968 hippie and community spirit. For five years, he enjoyed a string of hits with "Une belle histoire," "Attention mesdames, and messieurs", "Fais comme l’oiseau," "Chante… Comme si tu avais mourir demain," "La Fête," "Les Acadiens," "Le Printemps," and several sold-out performances at the Olympia.

In 1974, his musical comedy project for the cinema came to fruition with Un jour, la fête. After the Big Bazar adventure, Fugain continued to perform, notably in 1977 for a major show in Le Havre, for which he created the activist song "Le Chiffon rouge." He continued his career as an acrobat, then as a teacher, founding a workshop for artists at the Victorine Studios in 1979.

The following decades were more difficult, both professionally and personally. Disappointed by his television show Les Fugues à Fugain on TF1, he nevertheless released solo albums and singles such as Viva la vida in 1986, Chaque jour de plus in 1989, and Forteresse in 1992, which earned him a media and stage following. He then embarked on numerous musical collaborations, notably with Belgian singer Maurane.

In 2001, his daughter Laurette was diagnosed with leukemia and succumbed to the illness in 2002. Following her death, Fugain went on a hiatus. Producer Jean-Claude Camus convinced him to embark on new musical projects, such as the show "Attention mesdames et messieurs…" directed by Roger Louret at the Folies Bergère in 2005 and 2006. He paid tribute to his fellow artists by setting their lyrics to music on the album Bravo et merci! in 2007. He announced that he was stopping studio recordings, but returned to the stage with his Projet Pluribus in 2013 and his Causerie musicale in 2017.

A popular variety singer, sometimes flirting with jazz and bossa nova, he expresses humanist and libertarian convictions in his songs.

He is married to former dancer and actress Stephanie Fugain.

== Discography ==
=== Albums ===
- Je n'aurai pas le temps (I won't have time, 1967)
- Les fleurs de mandarine (Mandarin flowers, 1967)
- Une belle histoire (A beautiful story, 1972)
- Fais comme l'oiseau (Do it like the bird, 1972)
- Attention Mesdames et Messieurs (Attention, ladies and gentlemen, 1972)
- Chante (Sing, 1973)
- Jusqu'à demain peut-être (Until tomorrow maybe, 1973)
- La fête (The celebration, 1973)
- Bravo Monsieur le Monde (Bravo, mister World, 1973)
- Tout va changer (Everything is going to change, 1973)
- Les gentils, les méchants (Good people, bad people, 1973)
- Les Acadiens (The Acadians, 1975)
- Ring et Ding (Ring and ding, 1976)
- Le chiffon rouge (The red rag, 1977)
- Des rêves et du vent (Dreams and wind, 1988)
- Viva La Vida (Spanish title which means Live life, 1988)
- Où s'en vont (Where do they go, 1989)
- Petites fêtes entre amis (1996)
- De l'air! (1998)
- Encore (2001)
- Attention mesdames et messieurs... (2005)
- Bravo et merci! (2007)
- Projet pluribus (2013)

=== Greatest hits ===
- Fais Comme L'Oiseau - 1972
- C'est pas de l'amour mais c'est tout comme - 2012 No. 72 CAN
- L'essentiel (2002)
- C'est pas de l'amour mais c'est tout comme (2005)
- Platinum Collection (2008)
- Hit Collection (2009)
- Michel Fugain, Les années Big Bazar (2013) No. 54 FR

=== Singles ===
- "C'est que je t'aime" (1966)
- "Tu peux compter sur moi" (1966)
- "Un moral d'acier" (1967)
- "Daisy" (1967)
- "Les fleurs de mandarine" Festival (1968)
- "Je n'aurai pas le temps" (1968)
- "Il tempo che ho non basterà" (1968)
- "C'est pas ma faute" (1969)
- "Le temps met longtemps" (1969)
- "Balade en Bugatti" (1970)
- "Le temps de ma chanson" (1971)
- "Les rues de la grande ville" (1971)
- "Une belle histoire" (& Le Big Bazar) (1972)
- "Fais comme l'oiseau" (& Le Big Bazar) (1972)
- "Chante... comme si tu devais mourir demain" (& Le Big Bazar) (1973)
- "Als ginge morgen Deine Welt zugrund'" (& Le Big Bazar) (1973)
- "La fête" (et le Big Bazar) (1974)
- "Les acadiens" (et le Big Bazar) (1975)
- "Le printemps" (et le Big Bazar) (1976)
- "Ring et ding" (et le Big Bazar) (1976)
- "Vis ta vie" (et le Big Bazar) (1976)
- "Le chiffon rouge" (avec la Compagnie Michel Fugain) (1977)
- "Papa" (et sa Compagnie) (1978)
- "La vieille dame" (1978)
- "Bonjour nostalgie" (1979)
- "Loulou" (1979)
- "Les ailes dans le dos" (1979)
- "Le cœur au sud" (1984)
- "La fille de Rockefeller" (1985)
- "Viva la vida" (1986)
- "Des rêves et du vent" (1987)
- "Librement" (1988)
- "Les années guitare" (1989)
- "Où s'en vont..." (1989)
- "Chaque jour de plus" (1989)
- "Comme une histoire d'amour" (& Véronique Genest) (1990)
- "Alia soûza (& Véronique Sanson) WEA (1995)
- "2000 ans et un jour" (1998)
- "Encore" (2000)

== Bibliography ==
- Des rires et une larme (Paris, 2007)
