= Never Say Die (1988 film) =

- Theatrical release poster
- Directed by: Geoff Murphy
- Written by: Geoff Murphy
- Produced by: Geoff Murphy; Murray Newey
- Starring: Temuera Morrison; Lisa Eilbacher; Tony Barry
- Cinematography: Rory O'Shea
- Edited by: Scott Conrad
- Music by: Murray Grindlay; Billy Kristian; Sam Negri
- Distributed by: Kings Road Entertainment; Sidéral Films; VPS Film-Entertainment GmbH
- Release date: December 9, 1988 (Auckland)
- Running time: 90 minutes
- Country: New Zealand
- Language: English
- Box office: $378,000 (New Zealand)

Never Say Die is a 1988 New Zealand action comedy starring Temuera Morrison and Lisa Eilbacher. It was written and directed by Geoff Murphy.

== Plot ==
Both Alf and his wife Melissa have returned home to New Zealand after being homesick. After a delay in customs that irritates Alf, the two return to their old home which has just had the utilities switched back on. As they arrive the house is destroyed in a gas explosion.

Paranoid Alf goes to report his suspicions that the explosion was deliberate to his nemesis on the New Zealand Police, Inspector Evans. Evans thinks Alf is upset and imagining things. Alf later survives a car crash where his brakes were cut, however an examination of Alf's car lead Evans to believe that shrapnel from the house explosion cut the brake line.

Alf and Melissa escape to a country house on Waiheke Island where Alf's increasing paranoia leads him to establish a line of tripwires around the property that drop noise making kitchen utensils. Alf also arms himself with a small bore rabbit hunting rifle. They are joined by a hunter who eschews shooting bunnies and instead shoots at Melissa until Alf kills him with his rifle. Evans still thinks Alf is paranoid but is mystified as the unzeroed sights on Alf's weapon and its small calibre makes Alf's one shot one kill of the hunter a remote possibility. After fleeing to the West Coast of the South Island where Alf and Melissa are followed, and a helicopter drops two assassins with fully automatic weapons who destroy the Punakaiki property where they are staying, Evans starts to believe Alf. This leads to a cross country chase across New Zealand, featuring nonstop car chases, assassination attempts and continuous references to 007. Alf and Melissa eventually make their way back to Auckland Airport where a meetup with the lawyer of Melissa's father (who recently died) Witten reveals the true intentions of the assassination attempts and who the real culprit is.

== Cast ==
- Temuera Morrison as Alf Winters
- Lisa Eilbacher as Melissa Jones
- George Wendt as Mr. Witten
- Tony Barry as Detective Inspector Evans
- John Clarke as Car salesman
- Geoff Murphy as Jack
- Elizabeth McRae as Daisy
- Jay Laga'aia as Bruce (cop)
- Martyn Sanderson as Farmer

Morrison and McRae would work again together in 1992 on the TVNZ series Shortland Street. Several cast members (notably, Barry and Murphy himself) had appeared in Murphy's earlier film, Goodbye Pork Pie.

== Music and soundtrack ==
The song "Never Say Die" sung by Bunny Walters is featured during the closing credits. It is composed and performed by Billy Kristian. Other songs include "Get Outta Here" performed by Susan Lynch and Jacqui Fitzgerald, composed by Kristian and Geoff Murphy. "Never Say Die" and "Gotta Get Outta Here" are the A & B sides of the single released on WEA Z10002, released the same year. "007 Down She Goes" is performed by Nigel Lee, and written by Murray Grindlay.

== Release ==
The film premiered in Auckland on 9 December 1988 before opening in a 27-print wide New Zealand release showing in 70 locations over Christmas.

The film was released on VHS and is now out of print. It has never been released on DVD, but was released to purchase via digital download in 2022.

== Reception ==
Variety called it an upmarket version of Goodbye Pork Pie and said it confirmed Murphy's status as New Zealand's "foremost and most tantalizing director".
