= Koo De Tah (album) =

Studio album by Koo De Tah
- Released: September 1986
- Studio: Studios 301 (Sydney); Arco (Munich); Sound Barrier (Sydney); Lombardo Music
- Genre: Electronic; synth-pop; pop
- Label: Polygram; Maschina
- Producer: Doug Henderson; Leon Berger

Singles from Koo De Tah
- 1. "Too Young for Promises" Released: April 1985; 2. "Body Talk" Released: November 1985; 3. "Think of Me" Released: August 1986; 4. "Missed You All Along" Released: December 1986

Koo De Tah is the first and only studio album by Australian band Koo De Tah. The album was released in September 1986 and peaked at No. 54 on the Australian Albums Chart. In 2021, the album was reissued on LP and CD.

== Track listing ==
- All songs written by Leon Berger.

Side A
| No. | Title | Length |
|---|---|---|
| 1. | "Too Young for Promises" | 4:02 |
| 2. | "Think of Me" | 3:58 |
| 3. | "Missing You All Along" | 3:25 |
| 4. | "Over to You" | 3:53 |
| 5. | "Body Talk" | 4:10 |

Side B
| No. | Title | Length |
|---|---|---|
| 1. | "Change My Ways" | 3:50 |
| 2. | "Meant to Be" | 3:57 |
| 3. | "Fun Girl" | 3:42 |
| 4. | "Drift Away (Don't Let It)" | 4:03 |
| 5. | "Into the Future" | 4:23 |

== Charts ==
| Chart (1986) | Peak position |
|---|---|
| Australia (Kent Music Report) | 54 |
