= Lauren Roche =

New Zealand writer and general practitioner

Lauren Kim Roche
- Born: 5 November 1961 (age 64); Miramar, New Zealand
- Occupations: General practitioner, writer, speaker
- Writing career
- Genres: Autobiography, Non-fiction
- Notable work: Bent Not Broken
- Website: laurenkimroche.com

Lauren Kim Roche (born 5 November 1961) is a New Zealand author and general practitioner.

== Early life and education ==
Roche was born in Miramar, New Zealand, a suburb of Wellington. Leaving school at aged 15, Roche did various jobs from sex work and baking to cleaning at Wellington Hospital.

In 1991, she obtained her medical degree from the University of Otago.

== Career ==
Roche worked as a general practitioner and in hospices across the North Island, including Napier, Palmerston North, Auckland and Whangārei.

Published in 1999, her autobiography, Bent Not Broken, was number 4 spot on New Zealand's Bestseller List. Bent Not Broken is available in six countries and five languages and has been adapted into a stage play. Life on the Line, a sequel to Bent Not Broken, was published in 2001.

In 2009, Bent Not Broken was released as an audiobook by Expanded Technologies Incorporated.

The autobiographies chronicle Roche's life experiences which include: child sex abuse, rape, travel from New Zealand to United States as a ship stowaway, 1970's music groupie, prostitution, homosexuality, depression, suicide, bankruptcy, drug abuse, alcoholism, med school, author, radio personality, medical doctor, and special needs children.

In the late 1990s, Dr. Roche and Sharon Raynor hosted the weekly one-hour radio talk show, Doctor, Doctor. The show fielded a wide span of questions from the listeners encompassing topics such as medical issues, sexual orientation, depression, and discrimination.

Roche retired from practising medicine in 2019. She subsequently achieved a Diploma in Advanced Applied Writing through NorthTec, then a Masters in Creative Writing - 1st Class Hons - from Auckland University of Technology in 2021.

Roche released her debut novel Mila and the Bone Man - published by Quentin Wilson Publishing - in September 2022.

== Publications ==
=== Autobiography ===
- 1999. Bent Not Broken (Autobiography 1). New Zealand ISBN 1-877228-33-8
- 2001. Life on the Line (Autobiography 2). New Zealand ISBN 1-877228-40-0
- 2011. Bent Not Broken (Autobiography 3). Kindle USA ISBN 978-0-9824167-0-9
- 2022. Mila and the Bone Man (Fiction 1). New Zealand ISBN 978-0-9951438-9-0

=== Autobiography audio book ===
- 2009. Bent Not Broken (Autobiography Audio Book). United States

=== Articles ===
- 2000. Depression New Zealand
- 2003. Grief New Zealand

=== Novels ===
- 2022. Mila and the Bone Man
