= The Nearest Thing to Heaven =

"The Nearest Thing To Heaven"

Single by Bunny Walters
- B-side: "Songs We Sang Together"
- Released: 1974
- Genre: pop
- Label: Impact IR 1084
- Songwriter(s): Tony Macaulay, Gary Sulsh, Stuart Leathwood
- Producer(s): Alan Galbraith

Bunny Walters singles chronology
""Helena""	"The Nearest Thing To Heaven"	""Never Too Young To Rock""

The Nearest Thing To Heaven was a sizable hit for Bunny Walters in 1974. It reached #10 in the New Zealand charts. It was also his last hit.

== Background ==
The song was composed by Tony Macaulay, Gary Sulsh, and Stuart Leathwood. The song was originally recorded by Ben Thomas, released in the UK on Bell Records BELL 1272 in 1972. The version recorded by Bunny Walters was released in 1974 on Impact IR 1084. The B side contained "Songs We Sang Together" which was also composed by Tony Macaulay. This version that Walters recorded was produced by Alan Galbraith, and was the one that became the hit. This single followed his previous release, the Bernie Allen arranged "Helena", which even though a gold disc entry, wasn't a hit.

== Chart performance ==
The September 7, 1974, issue of Billboard recorded the song at No. 10 in New Zealand. That was the highest position it reached during a nine-week run on the chart. Walters didn't have any more chart hits after that.
