= Too Young for Promises =

Single by Koo De Tah

from the album Koo De Tah
- A-side: "Too Young for Promises"
- B-side: "Dancing (Towards the Stranger)"
- Released: June 1985
- Recorded: 1985
- Studio: Studios 301, Sydney
- Genre: Electronic music, Synth-pop
- Length: 4:02
- Label: Polygram Records
- Songwriter(s): Leon Berger
- Producer(s): Leon Berger, Doug Henderson

Koo De Tah singles chronology
"Too Young for Promises" (1985)	"Body Talk" (1985)

"Too Young for Promises" is a song written by Leon Berger and recorded by the Australian band Koo De Tah. It was released as the band's debut single in June 1985 and peaked at number 6 on the Australian Kent Music Report.

== Track listing ==
7" Single (880 673-7)

- Side A "Too Young for Promises" - 4:02
- Side B "Dancing (Towards the Stranger)" - 3:35

12" Single (880 673-1)

- Side A "Too Young for Promises" (Extended Mix) - 6:52
- Side B "Dancing (Towards the Stranger)" (Dance Mix) - 5:23

== Charts ==
=== Weekly charts ===
Chart (1985)	Peak position
Australia (Kent Music Report)	6
New Zealand (Recorded Music NZ)	48

=== Year-end charts ===
Chart (1985)	Position
Australia (Kent Music Report)	28

== Cover Versions ==
- In 2012, StereoLove featuring Tina Cross covered the song.
