= Body Talk (Koo De Tah song) =

Single by Koo De Tah

from the album Koo De Tah
- A-side: "Body Talk"
- B-side: "My Eyes Are Shut"
- Released: November 1985
- Recorded: 1985
- Studio: Studios 301, Sydney
- Genre: Electronic music, Synth-pop
- Length: 3:56
- Label: Polygram Records
- Songwriter(s): Leon Berger
- Producer(s): Leon Berger, Doug Henderson

Koo De Tah singles chronology
"Too Young for Promises" (1985)	"Body Talk" (1985)	"Think of Me" (1986)

"Body Talk" is a song written by Leon Berger and recorded by the Australian band Koo De Tah. It was released in November 1985 as the second single from the band's debut studio album, Koo De Tah. The peaked at number 27 on the Australian Kent Music Report.

== Track listing ==
7" Single (884 059-7)

- Side A "Body Talk" - 3:56
- Side B "My Eyes Are Shut"

12" Single (884 059-1)

- Side A "Body Talk" (Body Mix)
- Side B "My Eyes Are Shut"

== Charts ==
=== Weekly charts ===
Chart (1985/86)	Peak position
Australia (Kent Music Report)	27
