= Derek Metzger =

New Zealand singer and actor

Derek John Metzger is a New Zealand singer and actor best known for his performances in musical theatre in Australia.

== Career ==
Metzger began his career in 1978, winning The Entertainers, a talent contest on New Zealand television. He represented New Zealand in two International competitions; The Asian Song Contest [Hong Kong] where he was placed 3rd. In 1980 he sang a duet, "Once Again With You", with Tina Cross in the Pacific Song Contest [Canada], written by Carl Doy. The song was placed second and Derek and Tina won the 'Performance Award'. The same year he was voted Zealand's 'Rising Star'. He was a regular on NZ television through the 80s, including his own special Derek and Friends. His 1982 single "Don't Say Goodbye" debuted at #35 on New Zealand's singles chart.

In 1981, Metzger was cast in the lead role of Jonathan for the world première of Eaton Magoon Jr and Sir Robert Helpmann's Hawaiian musical Aloha for Hamilton Operatic Society at the Founders Theatre. A cast recording produced by Carl Doy was made of the show at Mandrill Studios, orchestrated and conducted by its musical director Derek Williams. In 1983 Metzger revived the role in a Hawaii production of the show. It was followed in 1985 by a Michael Edgley revival production at His Majesty's Theatre, Auckland, directed by Joe Layton, starring Metzger in the same role, also starring Hollywood actress Patricia Morison as Alika.

In 1986, Metzger moved to London where he joined the company of 42nd Street at Theatre Royal, Drury Lane. He also appeared in a production of the musical Matador at the Donmar Warehouse and a Tribute to Noel Coward at the Piccadilly Theatre. One of the highlights of his three years in London was appearing in the Royal Variety Performance.

He returned to New Zealand to play Anatoly in the NZ tour of Chess and to record his debut solo album Me and My Songs produced by his friend Carl Doy.

Metzger relocated to Australia in the early 90s, where he played leading roles in a succession of productions including Me and My Girl, Pirates of Penzance, The Mikado, She Loves Me, Follies, Chess, The Wizard of Oz, Pippin, Titanic, and How to Succeed in Business Without Really Trying. He received a Green Room Award for Male Actor in a Leading Role in music theatre for Me and My Girl. He received a Helpmann Award nomination for Best Male Actor in a Supporting Role in a Musical for his role of Patsy in the Australian production of Spamalot.
