= Gerry Merito =

New Zealand musician (1938–2009)

Gerald Kereti Merito
- Born: August 16, 1938; Whakatāne
- Died: January 26, 2009 (aged 70); Waihau
- Occupations: Singer and guitarist
- Known for: Member of the Howard Morrison Quartet
- Spouse: Dorothy Ohlson
- Children: Danieal Merito Ben Merito

Gerald Kereti Merito (16 August 1938 – 26 January 2009), was a New Zealand singer and guitarist, and one of the original members of the Howard Morrison Quartet.

Merito was born in 1938 in Whakatāne on his family farm and was a Tuhoe tribe member.

In 1999, Merito received the Benny Award from the Variety Artists Club of New Zealand Inc, the highest honour available to a New Zealand variety entertainer.

He died aged 70, after playing at the Waihau Hotel. Merito has two sons, Daniel and Ben with his wife Dorothy Ohlson.
