= Think of Me (Koo De Tah song) =

Single by Koo De Tah

from the album Koo De Tah
- A-side: "Think of Me"
- B-side: "Love 'Em Never"
- Released: November 1985
- Recorded: 1986
- Studio: Studios 301, Sydney
- Genre: Electronic music, Synth-pop
- Length: 3:58
- Label: Polygram Records
- Songwriter(s): Leon Berger
- Producer(s): Leon Berger, Doug Henderson

Koo De Tah singles chronology
"Body Talk" (1985)	"Think of Me" (1985)	"Missed You All Along" (1986)

"Think of Me" is a song written by Leon Berger and recorded by the Australian band Koo De Tah. It was released in September 1986 as the third single from the band's debut studio album, Koo De Tah. The peaked at number 69 on the Australian Kent Music Report.

== Track listing ==
7" Single (884 816-7)

- Side A "Think of Me" - 3:58
- Side B "Love 'Em Never" - 3:52

12" Single (884 816-1)

- Side A "Think of Me" (Mal Luka remix) - 5:20
- Side B "Love 'Em Never" - 3:52

== Charts ==
Chart (1986)	Peak position
Australia (Kent Music Report)	69
