= Kim Hart =

New Zealand singer-songwriter

- Born: 9 May 1960 (age 66); Auckland, New Zealand
- Genres: Pop
- Occupations: Singer, musician, songwriter
- Instruments: Vocals, guitar, piano
- Years active: 1976–1984
- Label: EMI Music

Kim Hart (born 9 May 1960) is a New Zealand singer-songwriter, who had an Australasian hit single in 1980 with "Love at First Night" which reached No.6 on the Australian Kent Music Report.

== Biography ==
Kim Denise Hart was born in Auckland on 9 May 1960. She was the lead vocalist in the Penrose High School Band, Chalkdust, which entered the 1976 Battle of the Bands competition, where they became finalists. Another band member from Chalkdust, Tina Cross, would also venture to Australia to form the famous 80s synthpop band "Koo De Tah".

Signed to EMI in 1977 Hart's first single was "You Don't Need Me"/"Born To Wander". This was followed in 1978 with "(You're a) Changed Man"/"You Light Up My Light" and "On My Toes Again"/"How Deep Is Your Love". Hart came second in the New Zealand finals of The South Pacific Song Contest with "On My Toes Again" and she represented New Zealand at the Yamaha Song Festival in Japan.

In 1978 Hart released her debut self-titled album, followed by a new single called "Fly Right Away" [Produced by Gerard Smith and Alastair Riddell with Paul Dunningham playing drums] and flip side "Blame It on the Sun" [Produced by Mike Harvey]. Another single in early 1979, "Running Around in Circles"/"Love Too Much".

In 1980 Hart released "Love At First Night", which reached number 15 on the New Zealand charts in June. The song was also released in Australia as her debut single there, and it peaked at number 6. Hart began recording a second album in Australia in 1980 but it was never released. Hart's final release in Australia was "Heartbeat"/"Don't Give Up" was released on RCA in 1984.

== Discography ==
=== Albums ===
Title	Album details
Kim Hart	Released: 1978; Format: LP; Label: EMI (HSD 1073)

=== Singles ===
Year	Title	Peak chart positions	Album
Year	Title	AUS	Album
1977	"You Don't Need Me"/"Born to Wander"	-	non album single
1978	"(You're a) Changed Man"	-	Kim Hart
1978	"On My Toes Again"	-	Kim Hart
1978	"Fly Right Away"	-	non album single
1979	"Running Round in Circles "	-	non album single
1980	"Love At First Night"	6	non album single
1980	"You're the One"	89	non album single
1980	"Out of Control" (with Steve Allen)	-	non album single
1980	"It's Easy"	-	non album single
1981	"Young Girl"	-	non album single
1981	"Feel Like Making Love"	-	non album single
1984	"Don't Give Up"/"Heartbeat"	-	non album single

== Awards ==
=== Aotearoa Music Awards ===
The Aotearoa Music Awards (previously known as New Zealand Music Awards (NZMA)) are an annual awards night celebrating excellence in New Zealand music and have been presented annually since 1965.

Year	Nominee / work	Award	Result	Ref.
1978	Kim Hart	Most Promising Female	Won	
