= If I Only Had Time =

Single by John Rowles
- B-side: "Now Is the Hour"
- Released: 17 February 1968
- Genre: Pop
- Length: 3:20
- Label: MCA MU 1000
- Songwriters: Michel Fugain; Pierre Delanoë; Jack Fishman
- Producer: Mike Leander

John Rowles UK singles chronology
| "If I Only Had Time" (1968) | "Hush ... Not a Word to Mary" (1974) |

"If I Only Had Time" is a song recorded by the New Zealand singer John Rowles in 1968 that became a worldwide hit single. It is based on a French song "Je n'aurai pas le temps" by Michel Fugain. Rowles' song was his first release in the United Kingdom where it reached number 3 on the chart.

== Background ==
"If I Only Had Time" is an English version of "Je n'aurai pas le temps", a French ballad written by Michel Fugain and Pierre Delanoë, and recorded by Fugain. Fugain's recording was released as a single and charted in 1967.

Manager Peter Gormley signed the New Zealander John Rowles to MCA in London, and for his first record release in the UK; Mike Leander was chosen to produce and arrange the song. New lyrics in English were written by Jack Fishman. It was released in the UK on 17 February 1968.

Rowles' version peaked at number 3 on the UK Singles Chart, number 2 in New Zealand, Belgium and the Netherlands, number 15 in Germany, and number 17 in Austria. It also performed well in the Australian cities, registering at number 5 in Sydney, number 14 in Melbourne, number 3 in Brisbane, number 6 in Adelaide and number 7 in Perth.

The song was re-released in 1988 on the Old Gold label. It was backed with "Hush Not a Word to Mary".

== Charts ==
| Chart (1968) | Peak position |
|---|---|
| Austria (Ö3 Austria Top 40) | 17 |
| Belgium (Ultratop 50 Flanders) | 2 |
| Ireland (IRMA) | 6 |
| Netherlands (Single Top 100) | 2 |
| New Zealand | 2 |
| UK Singles (Official Charts) | 3 |
| West Germany (GfK) | 15 |

== Other versions ==
- Jean-Claude Pascal recorded "Je n'aurai pas le temps" for his album Chansons d'hier et de toujours in 1968.
- Nick DeCaro released an instrumental version of "If I Only Had Time" as a single in 1968, and it reached No. 95 on the Billboard Hot 100, and 12 on the Easy Listening chart in 1969. It is included on his 1969 album Happy Heart.
- A Swedish cover, "Om vi hade en dag" (If we had a day) was made by * Lill Lindfors 1968
