= Golden Harvest (album) =

1978 studio album by Golden Harvest

Studio album by Golden Harvest
- Released: 1978
- Studio: Stebbing Recording (Auckland)
- Length: 38:04
- Label: Zodiac
- Producer: Rob Aickin

Golden Harvest is the self-titled debut and only studio album by pop group Golden Harvest. It was released in 1978 by Zodiac Records, and it peaked at 38 in New Zealand. It contains their best known single "I Need Your Love".

== Track listing ==
- All songs written by Gavin Kaukau, except where noted.

Golden Harvest track listing
No.	Title	Length
1.	"Love Is Everything"	3:38
2.	"Mrs. G"	4:31
3.	"Something Stopped"	3:25
4.	"Right Time of Year (Eru Kaukau, Mervyn Kaukau, G. Kaukau)"	4:14
5.	"I Need Your Love"	3:50
6.	"All Along the Watchtower (Bob Dylan)"	5:33
7.	"Give a Little Love"	3:18
8.	"Nite Lite"	3:28
9.	"Dancer (Ben Biddle, Kevin Kaukau)"	3:30
10.	"She's an Angel (Karl Gordon, K. Kaukau)"	2:34
Total length:		38:04

== Personnel ==
- Karl Gordon – vocals
- Kevin Kaukau – lead guitar
- Gavin Kaukau – rhythm guitar
- Eru Kaukau – bass
- Mervyn Kaukau – drums

Special thanks:

- Mike Harvey – keyboard
- Peter Woods – string arrangements
- Atwaters – Yamaha C580
