= Golden Harvest (band) =

Golden Harvest was a New Zealand band, which formed in Morrinsville and moved to Auckland in the mid-1970s. They are best known for their lone top-ten hit, "I Need Your Love", from 1977, which spent 12 weeks on the New Zealand singles charts and won Single of the Year at the 1978 NZ Music Awards. The band was led by singer Karl Gordon. The four Kaukau brothers, Gavin, Mervyn, Eru and Kevin were the other members. By 1980 the group had split up, with Gordon embarking on a solo career and Mervyn and Kevin moving to Australia.

== Discography ==
Singles
Title	Release info	Year	Notes
"Come Together" / "I Feel Good"	Impact IR 1088	1976	
"I Need Your Love" / "The Music Man"	Impact I.R. 2001	1978	Peaked at #7 on New Zealand charts
"Love Is Everything" / "To My Lady"	Key K91	1978	
"Hollywood Dreams" / "Dancer"	Key K 94	1979	
"Give A Little Love" / "Nite Lite"	Impact IR 2002	1979	
"Live My Life" / "Mrs G"	Key K 99	1979	

Albums
Title	Release info	Year	Notes
Golden Harvest	Key L 36681	1978	NZ No. 38
