= John Rowles =

New Zealand singer (born 1947)

Sir John Rowles KNZM OBE
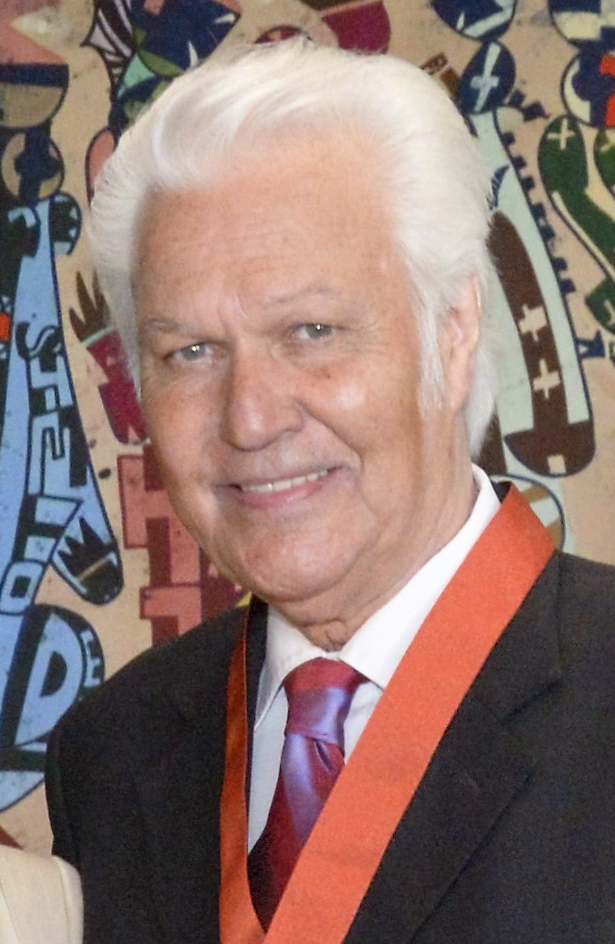
- Rowles in 2018

Background information
- Born: John Rowles; 26 March 1947 (age 79); Whakatāne, New Zealand
- Genre: Pop
- Occupations: Singer
- Years active: 1966–present
- Website: johnrowles.com

Sir John Edward Rowles KNZM OBE (born 26 March 1947) is a New Zealand singer. He was most popular in the late 1960s, 1970s and early 1980s, and he is best known in New Zealand for his song "If I Only Had Time" and from 1970, "Cheryl Moana Marie", which he wrote about his younger sister.

== Early years ==
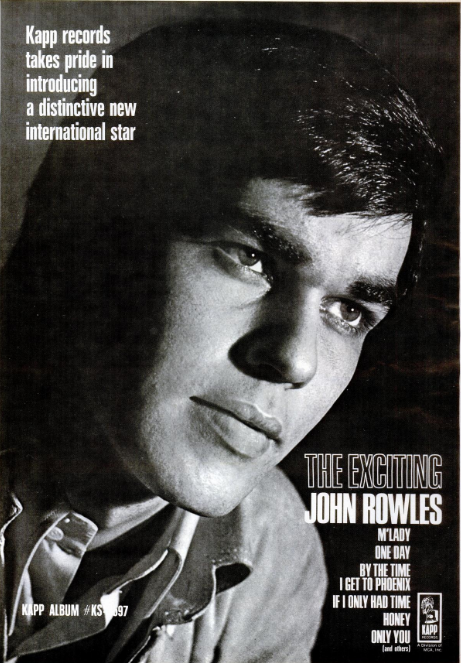
Rowles in 1969

Rowles was born in Whakatāne, New Zealand, and is of Māori descent. His father, Eddie Hohapata Rowles, played rugby union for the 1938 Māori All Blacks. His mother was European. He was brought up in Kawerau in the Bay of Plenty of New Zealand, and spent much of his early childhood in Te Atatū South in West Auckland. Rowles' birth name was simply John Rowles; he added the middle name "Edward" after his brother of that name died at a young age.

== Career ==
Rowles is best known in New Zealand and Australia, though he has also performed in the United States, particularly Las Vegas, Nevada, and Hawaii, where he was managed by Kimo Wilder McVay. In the United Kingdom, he is best known for the hit "If I Only Had Time", which reached number 3 on the UK Singles Chart in spring 1968, and stayed on the chart for eighteen weeks. This was a cover version of the French song "Je n'aurai pas le temps" with which the French singer Michel Fugain had a hit in 1967; he co-wrote the song with Pierre Delanoë. The song also charted in the Netherlands, reaching number 2, after which the Franck Pourcel Orchestra had a minor hit with an instrumental version of the song, bearing the original French song title. In Germany, Schlager singer Peter Rubin charted with the German translation "Hätt ich nur einmal mehr Zeit". In the US, Nick DeCaro and his orchestra charted with an instrumental version, released as the B-side of the single "Caroline, No" in late 1968, peaking at number 71 on the Cash Box Top 100 in early 1969.

Rowles had another top 20 hit in the UK with "Hush... Not a Word to Mary", also in 1968. This song also charted in the Netherlands.

In the US, "Cheryl Moana Marie" got noticed in the summer of 1970 by some West Coast radio stations, but it took until the end of 1970 for the song to chart nationally, peaking at number 64 on the Billboard Hot 100 and number 78 on the Cash Box Top 100, respectively, in early 1971. In Canada, the song made three separate appearances on the charts, with its third time peaking at number 76, on February 13, 1971, and also appeared on the MOR chart at No. 26.

He was the feature of a 2008 documentary entitled The Secret Life of John Rowles.

Rowles had a cameo role in the 2008 New Zealand film, Second Hand Wedding.

He appeared in the 2009 New Zealand version of Dancing with the Stars. He was partnered with Krystal Stewart. Under doctor's orders, he had to retire from the competition but has since recovered.

== Honours and awards ==
In 1974, Rowles received the Benny Award from the Variety Artists Club of New Zealand Inc, the highest honour available to a New Zealand variety entertainer.

Rowles was appointed an Officer of the Order of the British Empire in the 1979 New Year Honours, for services to entertainment and New Zealand interests in the United States. He was appointed a Knight Companion of the New Zealand Order of Merit, for services to entertainment, in the 2018 Queen's Birthday Honours.

== Awards ==
=== Aotearoa Music Awards ===
The Aotearoa Music Awards (previously known as New Zealand Music Awards (NZMA)) are an annual awards night celebrating excellence in New Zealand music and have been presented annually since 1965.

Year	Nominee / work	Award	Result	Ref.
1978	John Rowles	Male Artist of the Year	Won	

== Family ==
His older brother Wally Rowles was a solo singer with his own career, and for a while went under the name of Frankie Price. He later changed his name again to Frankie Rowles due to an artist "Price" who was working in Australia. Under Frankie Price he recorded three singles: "Pancho Lopez" b/w "Walk Like a Man", "Another Tear Falls" b/w "I Could Have Loved You So Well" and "Sweet Mary" b/w "Take a Little Time", all of which were released on the Polydor label. Under the name Frankie Rowles, he recorded the single "Ma Vie C'est Toi" b/w "Live a Little Longer" which was released on the Gemini label. He died at age 59 on 24 March 2004.

His sister Tania Rowles was a recording artist whose single "Don't Turn Around" was released on the RCA label in 1986. She was the winner of the New Zealand Music Award for Breakthrough Artist of the Year in 1986.

== Autobiography ==
Rowles released his autobiography, in collaboration with Angus Gillies, titled If I Only Had Time: THE AUTOBIOGRAPHY with Angus Gillies, in October 2012.
