= Jack Christie (musician) =

New Zealand musician, singer, songwriter, businessman (1924–2014)

Jack Christie MBE
- Born: John Brynn Christie; 29 June 1924; Wellington, New Zealand
- Died: 4 March 2014 (aged 89) Auckland, New Zealand
- Genre: Country
- Instruments: Vocals; guitar
- Years active: 1949–1954
- Label: TANZA
- Military career
- Allegiance: New Zealand
- Branch: Royal New Zealand Air Force
- Service years: 1941–1945
- Rank: Flight lieutenant

John Brynn Christie MBE (29 June 1924 – 4 March 2014) was a New Zealand musician who had brief prominence in the early 1950s. He was the first New Zealand country musician to be recorded and the third musician to have an official release on the newly formed TANZA label.

== Biography ==
Christie was born to Samuel Basil Christie and his wife Elizabeth Frances née Welch in Wellington on 29 March 1924. As a boy he attended New Lynn West Primary School as well as Mount Albert Grammar School and later attended The University of Auckland. He enlisting in the Second World War, joining the RNZAF in 1942. During this time he would regularly play guitar and sing for soldiers along with other servicemen. He also would perform at variety acts and appear on local Wellington radio under the pseudonym "The Singing Cowboy". Christie attended the No. 6 Service Flying Training School in Dunnville, Ontario where he graduated with Class 104-1 on 17 October 1944. During the War he received the rank of Flight Lieutenant and assisted in the training of pilots.

Upon his Return to New Zealand, Christie established the Atomic Radio Company in Karangahape Road, Auckland where he imported radios and gramophones as well as records until he was accused of parallel importing. After which he included free records with every purchase. It was while working here he got to know radio technician Stan Dallas, who worked for 2ZB. In 1948 Stan built the recording studio at TANZA (To Assist New Zealand Artists) which Jack assisted with, working in copyrights for the company as well. TANZA was the first New Zealand company to record and produce its own records. While the studio was being developed Stan called on Jack to record sample acetates which were heard by the rest of the company. When the studio was completed Jack was invited to record. He recorded two records in 1949 with his cover of Roy Darling's song "Overlander Trail" become popular in New Zealand. This was the first commercially available New Zealand made country record, released the same year as The Tumbleweeds "Maple On The Hill". Over the next three years TANZA released seven more records and in 1954 he released one final record. Jack was the third artist to be recorded by the label. He was proceeded by Ruru Karaitiana and Ken Avery. Although most of Jack's songs were covers of Australian and American songwriters, his song "The New Zealand Cowboy", released in 1951, was written by him, possibly the first country style song recorded about New Zealand. A year prior he also released "Serenade A Star", written by Sam Freedman, a songwriter from Wellington who also wrote songs for other TANZA musicians such as Pixie Williams, Mavis Rivers and Daphne Walker.

After his brief music career Christie created the Tisco Technology Innovation Service Company which installed and tuned televisions not long after the introduction of TV in New Zealand. This became the foremost television installation company in the country. He also went into many different businesses, often acting as director, as well as chairman for Ullrich Aluminium. He had particular involvement with the New Zealand Grand Prix which saw him obtain an MBE in the 1989 Queen's Birthday Honours for services to manufacturing, sport and the community. Jack died on 4 March 2014 at the Edmund Hillary Retirement Village in Auckland. He was 89 at the time of his death. He was cremated and buried at Purewa Cemetery on the anniversary of his death the following year. He was survived by his wife Valerie and family.

== Discography ==
=== Singles ===
- "She Came Rolling Down The Mountain" / "Overlander Trail" (TANZA, 1949)
- "Clancy Lowered the Boom" / "Hermit Of The Hills" (TANZA, 1949)
- "Barnacle Bill The Sailor" / "Serenade A Star" (TANZA, 1950)
- "Let’s Grow Old Together" / "The Freight-Train Yodel" (TANZA, 1950)
- "Ragtime Cowboy Joe" / "There's A Hole In The Old Oaken Bucket" Featuring Pat Bridgeman. (TANZA, 1950)
- "Mountain Barbecue" / "Nettie The Nitwit Of The Networks" (TANZA, 1951)
- "The New Zealand Cowboy" / "Where The Roly Poly Grass Rolls O'er The Plains" (TANZA, 1951)
- "Rudolph The Red Nosed Reindeer" / "Goin' To The Rodeo To-Day" (TANZA, 1951)
- "Shotgun Boogie" / "Bushman Of My Dreams" (TANZA, 1951)
- "Payday" / "Riding Home At Sundown" (TANZA, 1952)
- "The Kid's Last Fight" / "They Made Me Fall In Love With You" (TANZA, 1954)
