= Jim Carter (New Zealand musician) =

New Zealand musician (1919–2023)

- Birth name: James Arthur Carter
- Born: 27 March 1919; England
- Died: 2 October 2022 (aged 103); Nelson, New Zealand
- Genres: Hawaiian, Rock and roll
- Occupation: Post office worker
- Instrument(s): Lap steel guitar, guitar
- Labels: TANZA, His Master's Voice

James Arthur Carter (27 March 1919 – 2 October 2022) was a New Zealand musician who performed on the first single to be locally recorded and manufactured in New Zealand titled Blue Smoke.

In 1955, as part of Ken Avery's Rockin' Rhythm, Carter performed on what is considered to be the first rock and roll song recorded in New Zealand, a cover of "Rock Around the Clock" as sung by Johnny Cooper Carter also performed on other notable Johnny Cooper songs such as "Pie Cart Rock 'n' Roll" and "Look What You've Done (To My Heart)".

== Awards ==
On 2 October 2019, Carter, along with Ruru Karaitiana and Pixie Williams, was inducted into the New Zealand Music Hall of Fame, to mark the 70th anniversary of the release of "Blue Smoke".

Year	Nominee / work	Award	Result	Ref.
2019	Jim Carter	New Zealand Music Hall of Fame	inductee	
