= Hooray for Love =

Hooray for Love may refer to:

- Hooray for Love (film), a 1935 film starring Ann Sothern and Gene Raymond
- "Hooray for Love", a 1935 song written by Jimmy McHugh with lyrics by Dorothy Fields composed for the 1935 film of the same name
- "Hooray for Love", a 1948 song written by Harold Arlen with lyrics by Leo Robin composed for the 1948 film Casbah
- Hooray for Love (TV musical)
- Hooray for Love (album), a 1960 album by New Zealand and Polynesian jazz singer Mavis Rivers
