= Wade Mainer =

American bluegrass musician (1907–2011)

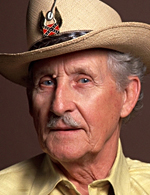
- Mainer in his later years

Background information
- Born: Wade Eckhart Mainer; April 21, 1907; Buncombe County, North Carolina, U.S.
- Died: September 12, 2011 (aged 104) Flint, Michigan, U.S.
- Genres: Bluegrass
- Occupation: Musician
- Instrument(s): Banjo, Jew's harp, guitar, vocals
- Years active: 1934–1993
- Labels: Old Homestead

Wade Eckhart Mainer (April 21, 1907 – September 12, 2011) was an American country singer and banjoist. With his band, the Sons of the Mountaineers, he is credited with bridging the gap between old-time mountain music and Bluegrass and is sometimes called the "Grandfather of Bluegrass". In addition, he innovated a two-finger banjo fingerpicking style, which was a precursor to modern three-finger bluegrass styles.

Originally from North Carolina, Mainer's main influences came from the mountain music of his family. In a career that began in 1934 and spanned almost six decades, Mainer transitioned from being a member of his brother's band into the founder of his own ensemble, the Sons of the Mountaineers, with whom he performed until 1953, when he became more deeply involved with his Christianity and left the music industry. After working at a General Motors factory and attending gospel revivals, Mainer was convinced that he should restart his career as a Christian gospel musician and began to tour with his wife in this capacity. He continued to release albums until 1993.

== Personal life ==
Mainer was born near Weaverville, North Carolina, on a mountain farm in Buncombe County on April 21, 1907. His family was poor during his childhood and they lived in a log cabin in the Blue Ridge Mountains. Mainer credited his father who was, in Mainer's words, "a good singer – real stout voice", as of one of his influences. During his career as a musical artist, Mainer would perform many of the old songs that he had heard from his father.

Mainer grew up listening to traditional mountain music and was largely influenced by his brother-in-law Roscoe Banks. He first learned to play the banjo at square dances, where he would pick up instruments left by performers and practice on them. After moving to Concord, North Carolina and working in a series of jobs at cotton mills, he became a part of his brother J.E.'s band, known as J. E. Mainer's Mountaineers. His entry into the band in 1934 marked the beginning of a nearly six-decade career in music. J.E. played the fiddle while Wade performed on the banjo for the string band, and they played at fiddlers' conventions and other gatherings.

Mainer married Julia Mae Brown at the end of 1937, shortly after forming his own band. Brown was a singer and guitarist popularly known at the time as Hillbilly Lilly. She had performed from 1935 until 1937 at WSJS Radio in Winston-Salem. Brown is considered to be a pioneering female musical artist and later joined Mainer during his performances.

== Musical career ==
Mainer's first recordings came in 1934 and are compiled on Ragged But Right: 30's Country Bands. Mainer performed with The Mountaineers on tracks such as "Maple on the Hill", "Seven and a Half" and "Johnson's Old Grey Mule". Also included on the compilation are Mainer's later collaboration "Short Life and It's Trouble" with Zeke Morris, his solo effort "Riding on That Train 45" and a sample song "Mitchell Blues" from his band the Sons of the Mountaineers. Throughout his career, he was noted for his unique and innovative two-finger banjo fingerpicking style, which some view as a precursor to three finger bluegrass banjo styles. Mainer took jobs at local radio stations to increase the visibility of his relative's ensemble, recording classics such as "Take Me in the Lifeboat". During this time, he appeared on many regional stations including WBT in Charlotte, WPTF in Raleigh, WNOX in Knoxville and WPAQ in Mount Airy.

Mainer performed in a series of live radio shows with The Mountaineers, sponsored by Crazy Water Crystals laxatives. In 1934, J.W. Fincher, the head of the company, observed their popularity at the first gig, the Crazy Water Crystal Barn Dance, a radio program out of Charlotte. Under the name J. E. Mainer's Crazy Mountaineers, they toured the American South on live radio shows and recorded fourteen songs for Bluebird Records. "Maple on the Hill", which according to the National Endowment for the Arts was their biggest hit, had originally been composed in the 1890s by Gussie L. Davis.

Mainer was in his brother J.E.'s band for two years, until he left for more traditional work, which at the time was far more profitable than his musical career. Making only five dollars a week under sponsorship, Mainer found that he could earn up to three times as much working at a yarn mill, which he described as being "gold" for the era. After leaving his brother's group in 1936, he began to perform duet work with Zeke Morris, who was a bandmate from The Mountaineers. After a time working on this project, Mainer and Morris left to form the short-lived "Little Smilin' Rangers" -- who recorded eight sides that were released in 1938 and later became the "Sons of the Mountaineers". Zeke Morris then got together with his brother Wiley to form The Morris Brothers.

=== Sons of the Mountaineers ===
Mainer named this new band Sons of the Mountaineers. Its initial lineup included Jay Hugh Hall and Clyde Moody as guitarists with Steve Ledford as a fiddler. Among the musicians who would join the group later were Jack and Curly Shelton, Tiny Dodson, Red Rector and Fred Smith. The band got its start performing on the radio and recording songs for Bluebird Records and their first hit, entitled "Sparkling Blue Eyes" was recorded in 1939. From 1935 through 1941, Mainer recorded over 165 songs for the record label RCA Victor in various lineups, ranking him among the most prolifically recorded country music artists of that period.

The Sons of the Mountaineers briefly stopped playing during World War II because Mainer could not afford to squander the valuable gasoline required for the journey to the radio stations. One notable exception, however, came in 1941, when they were invited to the White House by Eleanor Roosevelt and Alan Lomax. There in Washington D.C., they played several tunes, including "Down in the Willow Garden", a song personally requested by President Franklin Delano Roosevelt. During this time, they also appeared in a version of The Chisholm Trail in New York City. At war's end, the band was reorganized and once again began to play at stations across North Carolina. Recordings at this time were sporadic, due to the declining popularity of the genre. In 1953, after having renewed his commitment to Christianity, Mainer left the group and exited the industry for a time.

== Later life ==
In 1953, Mainer and his wife settled in Flint, Michigan, where he found work at a General Motors factory. Although renouncing both the music industry and his trademark instrument, the banjo, he and Julia did continue to sing at gospel revival meetings. In the early 1960s, Molly O'Day convinced him that he could use the banjo in gospel recordings, which spurred a series of religiously themed banjo albums beginning in 1961. He also began to record and tour with his wife.

Mainer retired from General Motors in 1973. Mainer has been credited with bridging the gap between old-time mountain music and Bluegrass. Musicians such as Bill Monroe, Ralph Stanley and Doc Watson have all cited Mainer as a source of influence. He has also been called the "Grandfather of Bluegrass". His influence was not limited to the United States. Pete Smith, of the British newspaper The Advertiser, in a report for Mainer's 100th birthday, cited Mainer as "one of the most influential figures in the development of modern bluegrass", noting his picking style and his efforts in bringing bluegrass closer to the mainstream. In addition, Smith also credits him for making the banjo, an instrument previously described as "satanic", acceptable for spiritually-themed music. Mainer continued to live with his wife in Flint, where he celebrated his centenary in 2007 and performed at a concert for his 101st birthday in 2008.

== Awards and honors ==
Mainer is a recipient of a 1987 National Heritage Fellowship awarded by the National Endowment for the Arts, which is the United States government's highest honor in the folk and traditional arts. In 1996 he received the Michigan Heritage Award and the Michigan Country Music Association and Services' Lifetime Achievement Award. In 1998 both he and his wife were inducted into the Michigan Country Music Hall of Fame, while Mainer received North Carolina's Surry Arts Council Lifetime Achievement.

== Original discography ==
=== Wade Mainer/Zeke Morris ===
Matrix	Title	Record #	Recording date
99133	"Come Back To Your Dobie Shack"	Bluebird 6551	February 14, 1936
99134	"Just As the Sun Went Down"	Bluebird 6383	February 14, 1936
99135	"What Would You Give In Exchange"	Bluebird 8073	February 14, 1936
99136	"Bring Me a Leaf From the Sea"	Bluebird 6347	February 14, 1936
99137	"Brown Eyes"	Bluebird 6347	February 14, 1936
99138	"Maple On the Hill - Part 2"	Bluebird 6293	February 15, 1936
99139	"Going To Georgia"	Bluebird 6423	February 15, 1936
99140	"Nobody's Darling But Mine"	Bluebird 6423	February 15, 1936
99141	"Mother Came to Get Her Boy Back From Jail"	Bluebird 6383	February 15, 1936
99142	"Where the Red, Red Roses Grow"	Bluebird 6293	February 15, 1936
102612	"My Cradle Days"	Bluebird 6489	June 15, 1936
102613	"Gathering Flowers From the Hillside"	Bluebird 6489	June 15, 1936
102614	"My Mother Is Waiting"	Bluebird 6551	June 15, 1936
102615	"If I Could Hear My Mother Pray Again"	Bluebird 6460	June 15, 1936
102616	"Nobody's Darling On Earth"	Bluebird 6460	June 15, 1936
102617	"Shake Hands With Your Mother"	Bluebird 6596	June 15, 1936
2530	"They Said My Lord Was A Devil"	Bluebird 6653	October 12, 1936
2531	"Won't Somebody Pal With Me"	Bluebird 6704	October 12, 1936
2532	"Hop Along Peter"	Bluebird 6752	October 12, 1936
2533	"Just One Way To the Pearly Gates"	Bluebird 6784	October 12, 1936
2534	"Dear Daddy, You're Gone	Bluebird 6752	October 12, 1936
2535	"Been Foolin' Me, Baby"	Bluebird 6704	October 12, 1936
2536	"I'll Be a Friend of Jesus"	Bluebird 6784	October 12, 1936
2537	"Cowboy's Pony In Heaven"	Bluebird 6653	October 12, 1936
7051	"Little Birdie"	Bluebird 6840	February 16, 1937
7052	"I've Always Been a Rambler"	Bluebird 6890	February 16, 1937
7053	"I'm Starting Life A New With You"	Bluebird 6840	February 16, 1937
7054	"Little Rosebuds"	Bluebird 6993	February 16, 1937
7055	"Train Carry My Gal Back Home"	Bluebird 6890	February 16, 1937
7056	"In the Land Beyond the Blue"	Bluebird 6936	February 16, 1937
7057	"A Change All Around"	Bluebird 6993	February 16, 1937
7058	"Short Life and It's Trouble"	Bluebird 6936	February 16, 1937
11812	"The Dying Boy's Prayer"	Bluebird 7165	August 2, 1937
11813	"Free Again"	Bluebird 7114	August 2, 1937
11814	"Answer To Two Little Rosebuds"	Bluebird 7114	August 2, 1937
11815	"I'm Not Turning Backward"	Bluebird 7165	August 2, 1937
11820	"Riding On That Train 45"	Bluebird 7298	August 2, 1937
11821	"Little Maggie"	Bluebird 7201	August 2, 1937
11822	"Little Pal"	Bluebird 7201	August 2, 1937
11823	"Down In the Willow"	Bluebird 7298/Victor 27497	August 2, 1937

=== Wade Mainer's Smilin' Rangers ===
Matrix	Title	Record #	Recording date
11825	"Ramshackle Shack"	Bluebird 7274	August 2, 1937
11826	"Memory Lane"	Bluebird 7274	August 2, 1937
11827	"Wild Bill Jones"	Bluebird 7249	August 2, 1937
11828	"I Want To Be Loved"	Bluebird 7249	August 2, 1937
11816	"What Are You Goin' To Do Brother"	Bluebird 7384	August 3, 1937
11817	"Companions Draw Nigh"	Bluebird 7384	August 3, 1937
11818	"Mountain Sweetheart"	Bluebird 7587	August 3, 1937
11819	"Don't Forget Me, Little Darling"	Bluebird 7587	August 3, 1937

=== Wade Mainer and his Sons of the Mountaineers ===
Matrix	Title	Record #	Recording date
18763	"Lonely Tomb"	Bluebird 7424	January 27, 1938
18764	"Pale Moonlight"	Bluebird 7483	January 27, 1938
18765	"All My Friends"	Bluebird 7424	January 27, 1938
18766	"Since I Met My Mother-In-Law"	Bluebird 7742	January 27, 1938
18767	"Don't Get Too Deep In Love"	Bluebird 7483	January 27, 1938
18768	"Don't Leave Me Alone"	Bluebird 7561	January 27, 1938
18769	"I Won't Be Worried"	Bluebird 7561	January 27, 1938
18770	"Where Romance Calls"	Bluebird 7753	January 27, 1938
18771	"Another Alabama Camp Meetin'"	Bluebird 7753	January 27, 1938
18772	"Mitchell Blues"	Bluebird 7845	January 27, 1938
26981	"Father Along"	Bluebird 8023	September 26, 1938
26982	"Dear Loving Mother and Dad"	Bluebird 8152	September 26, 1938
26983	"Can't Tell About These Women"	Bluebird 7965	September 26, 1938
26984	"That Kind"	Bluebird 7861	September 26, 1938
26985	"If I Had Listened To Mother"	Bluebird 8137	September 26, 1938
26986	"She Is Spreading Her Wings For A Journey"	Bluebird 8023	September 26, 1938
26987	"The Same Old You and Me"	Bluebird 7924	September 26, 1938
26988	"Life's Evenin' Sun"	Bluebird 8007	September 26, 1938
26998	"You're Awfully Mean To Me"	Bluebird 7861	September 26, 1938
26999	"Home In the Sky"	Bluebird 8007	September 26, 1938
27700	"A Little Love"	Bluebird 7924	September 26, 1938
27701	"North Carolina Moon"	Bluebird 8628	September 26, 1938
27702	"More Good Women Gone Wrong"	Bluebird 7965	September 26, 1938
32625	"Sparkling Blue Eyes"	Bluebird 8042	February 4, 1939
32626	"We Will Miss Him"	Bluebird 8042	February 4, 1939
32627	"I Left My Home In the Mountains"	Bluebird 8091	February 4, 1939
32628	"I Met Her At A Ball One Night"	Bluebird 8091	February 4, 1939
32629	"You May Forsake Me"	Bluebird 8120	February 4, 1939
32630	"Look On and Cry"	Bluebird 8120	February 4, 1939
32631	"One Little Kiss"	Bluebird 8145	February 4, 1939
32632	"Mama, Don't Make Me Go To Bed"	Bluebird 8145	February 4, 1939
32633	"Crying Holy"	Bluebird 8203	February 4, 1939
32634	"Heaven Bells Are Ringing"	Bluebird 8203	February 4, 1939
41200	"Sparkling Blue Eyes No.2"	Bluebird 8249	August 21, 1939
41201	"The Poor Drunkard's Dream"	Bluebird 8273	August 21, 1939
41202	"Were You There"	Bluebird 8273	August 21, 1939
41203	"The Gospel Cannon Ball"	Bluebird 8249	August 21, 1939
41204	"The Great and Final Judgement"	Bluebird 8288	August 21, 1939
41205	"What a Wonderful Savior Is He"	Bluebird 8288	August 21, 1939
41206	"Why Not Make Heaven Your Home"	Bluebird 8340	August 21, 1939
41207	"Mansions In the Sky"	Bluebird 8340	August 21, 1939
41208	"Not a Word of That Be Said"	Bluebird 8359	August 21, 1939
41209	"Drifting Through an Unfriendly World"	Bluebird 8359	August 21, 1939
71014	"Shake My Mother's Hands For Me"	Bluebird 8848	September 29, 1941
71015	"Anywhere Is Home"	Bluebird 8965	September 29, 1941
71016	"I Can Tell You the Time"	Bluebird 8965	September 29, 1941
71017	"He Gave His Life"	Bluebird 8887	September 29, 1941
71018	"Ramblin' Boy	Bluebird 8990	September 29, 1941
71019	"The Precious Jewel"	Bluebird 8887	September 29, 1941
71020	"Old Ruben"	Bluebird 8990	September 29, 1941
71021	"Precious Memories"	Bluebird 8848	September 29, 1941

== Other discography ==
=== Studio albums ===
- 1961: Soulful Sacred Songs
- 1971: Sacred Songs of Mother and Home
- 1973: The Songs of Wade Mainer
- 1976: From the Maple to the Hill
- 1980: Old Time Songs
- 1984: Old Time Banjo Tunes
- 1987: In the Land of Melody
- 1989: How Sweet to Walk
- 1990: String Band Music
- 1993: Old Time Gospel Favorites
- 1993: Carolina Mule

=== Compilation albums ===
- 1979: Early Radio
- 1983: Early and Great, Volume 1
- ????: Early and Great, Volume 2
- 1993: Early and Great, Volume 3
