= Capping =

Capping may refer to:

- the creation of five-prime (5') caps in a cell nucleus
  - Capping enzyme
- Cap (sport), making an appearance in a game at international level
- Ambulance chasing, the practice of lawyers seeking clients at a disaster site
- Jakugo, or capping phrase, a response to a Zen kōan
- Capping stunt, a New Zealand university student prank
- Capping week, New Zealand universities' graduation week
- Frequency capping in marketing
- Session capping in advertising
- Window capping in building construction
- In situ capping of subaqueous waste in environmental remediation
- Capitalization in writing
- Capping, meaning lying; see Glossary of Generation Z slang
