= Cole Wilson =

New Zealand musician, singer, songwriter, railway worker (1922-1993)

- Born: Colin James Wilson; 11 October 1922; Dunedin, New Zealand
- Died: 6 January 1993 (aged 70) Dunedin, New Zealand
- Genres: Country
- Occupation: Singer-songwriter
- Instruments: Vocals, guitar
- Years active: 1949–1993
- Labels: TANZA, Viking Records
- Relatives: Les Wilson (brother)

Colin James Wilson (11 October 1922 – 6 January 1993) was a New Zealand musician, singer, songwriter and railway worker born in Dunedin. As a guitarist and vocalist for his group Cole Wilson And His Tumbleweeds, he performed and made recordings spanning almost 40 years.

== Biography ==
Colin James "Cole" Wilson was born on 11 October 1922 at St Kilda, Dunedin to parents Robert Moffat Wilson & Louisa Elizabeth Lemon. His parents had two children before his birth and two after; this made Cole the middle child. He was schooled at Mornington School, Dunedin and stayed in Dunedin for most of his life.

He had discovered country and western music as a child and artists like the Carter Family and Jimmie Rodgers. He also had interest in Slim Gaillard and Django Reinhardt who were not country musicians. He bought his first guitar when he was twelve and continued using it throughout his life. He mainly taught himself how to play however he took instruction from Dunedin music teacher Sol Stokes. Growing up in the Ida Valley in the Central Otago of New Zealand, Wilson found work in low paying, rural jobs such as farmhand. In 1943, he joined the New Zealand Army and was placed in the Royal New Zealand Air Force, seeing action in the Solomon Islands during the Guadalcanal Campaign and at Papua New Guinea in the Bougainville campaign.

After the end of the Second World War, Wilson found employment in Gisborne for a short time before returning to his home in Dunedin. He decided to try the music business and soon found a group called The Tumbleweeds, founded by Bill Ditchfield. They went up to Wellington to record six 78s. One of these being their biggest hit, "Maple on the hill", which repeatedly elling 80,000 copies. In 1952, Wilson married Myra Daphne Wembley Hewitt in a double wedding with Colin McCrorie and Myra's sister, Nola. Wilson held many jobs during his life, spending a numberOne of yearsthese with New Zealand Railways, but on his marriage certificate he described himself as a professional entertainer.was After making 16 records for TANZA, from 1957 they recorded eight albums on Viking Records from 1957; Cole himself recorded two solo records. The band's national fame increased as more records were produced and the band saw greater air time on radio stations. Cole's younger brother Les had found success in Australia as The Otago Rambler however, Wilson never toured with his group in Australia. Cole Wilson wrote several songs for the group which were some of the most popular amongst the group's recordings. Touring was kept up throughout Wilson's life. In 1973, he and The Tumbleweeds toured the South Island with Canadian country musician Hank Snow. In 1982, the band released an album thought to be their last recording of new material and not new recordings of older material. The group was inducted into the New Zealand Country Music Association Hall Of Fame and were awarded with the New Zealand Country Music Pioneer Award three years prior.

== Personal life ==
During his marriage, Wilson had one son, Wesley. Wilson died on 6 January 1993, aged 70. His last residence was Number 10 Kelvin Road in Dunedin; he lived there with his wife Myra. He was cremated and interred in the Green Park Cemetery in Dunedin. Myra survived him by 20 years; she died on 30 April 2013, aged 87.
