= Radio Corporation of New Zealand =

Major New Zealand radio and electronics manufacturer

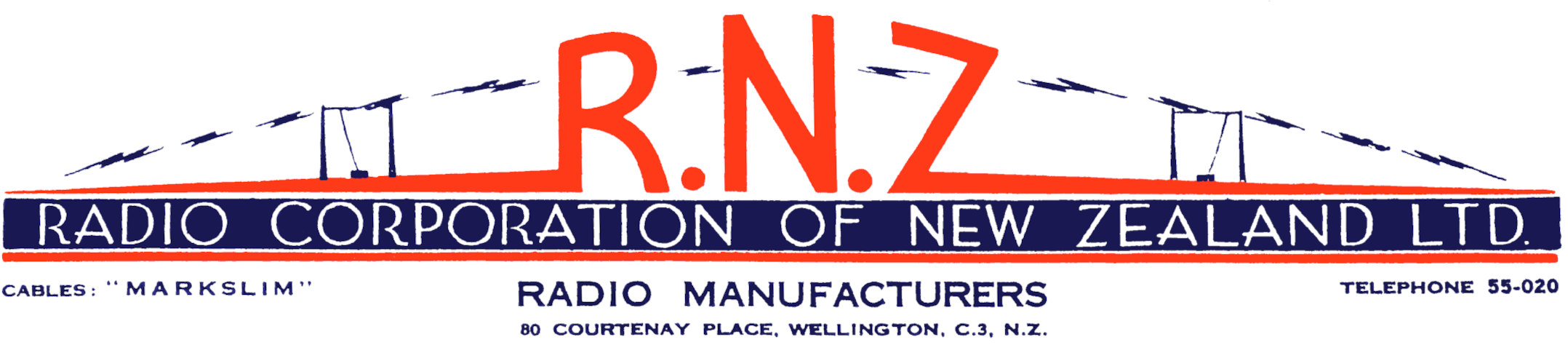
- Industry: Radio manufacturing
- Founded: 1929; 97 years ago as W. Marks Ltd
- Defunct: 1 May 1984
- Headquarters: Wellington, New Zealand
- Key people: William Marks (managing director)
- Products: Radio, wire, records, intercom, test equipment

The Radio Corporation of New Zealand was one of New Zealand's big four early manufacturers of radio and electronic equipment (consisting of the Radio Corporation of New Zealand, Collier & Beale, Radio Ltd and Akrad Radio Corp). They predominantly designed and manufactured domestic radio receivers—of which their two main brands were distributed through their nationwide chain of Columbus Radio Centres (Columbus) and through Turnbull & Jones nationwide branches (Courtenay)—although they were also known for test equipment, intercommunications devices, RACOL wire and the TANZA recording label and more.

== History ==
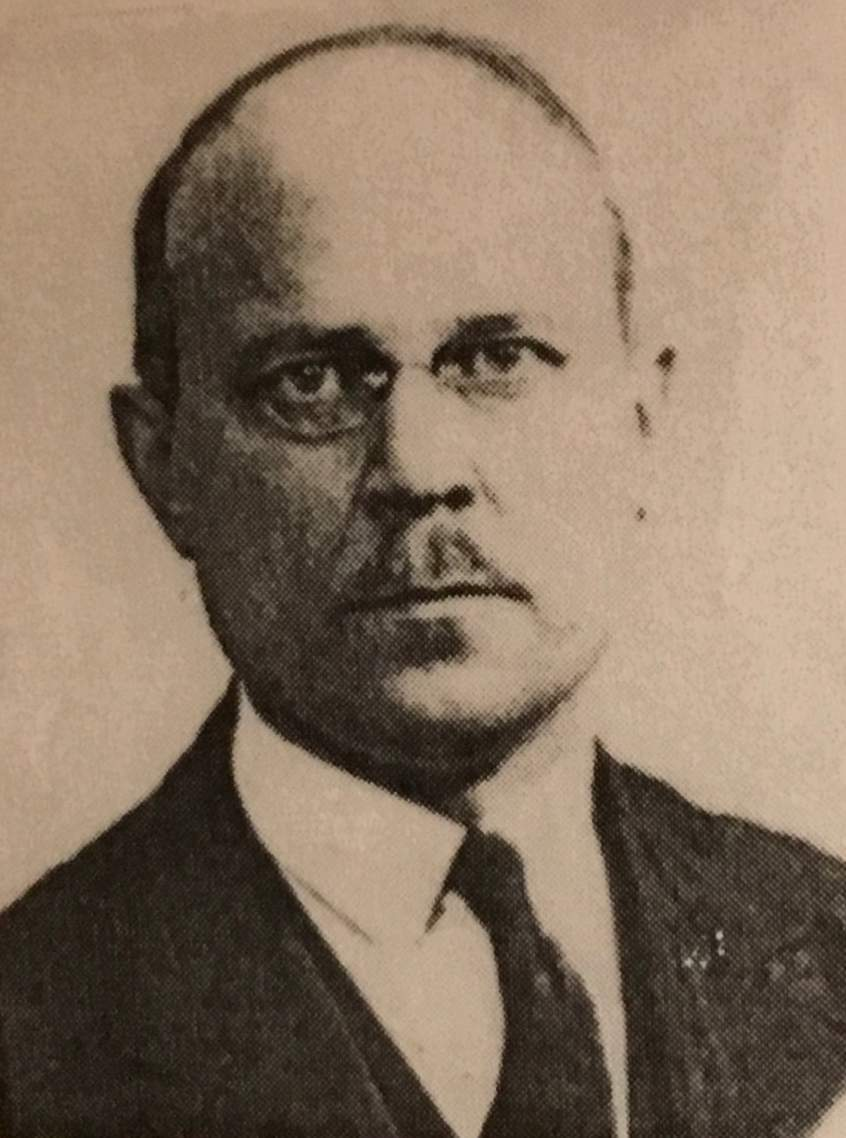
William Marks (formerly Markov)

In November 1926, William Marks (formerly Markov), a Russian Émigré with an honours degree in Electrical Engineering, stepped ashore in Wellington, New Zealand. He found work with the Wellington City Council, and is said to have distinguished himself with his ability to repair complex equipment.

In 1929, Marks went into business for himself, opening a small shop in Cornhill St, Wellington, supplying basic radio parts and equipment, building amplifiers, rewinding transformers and other related activities.

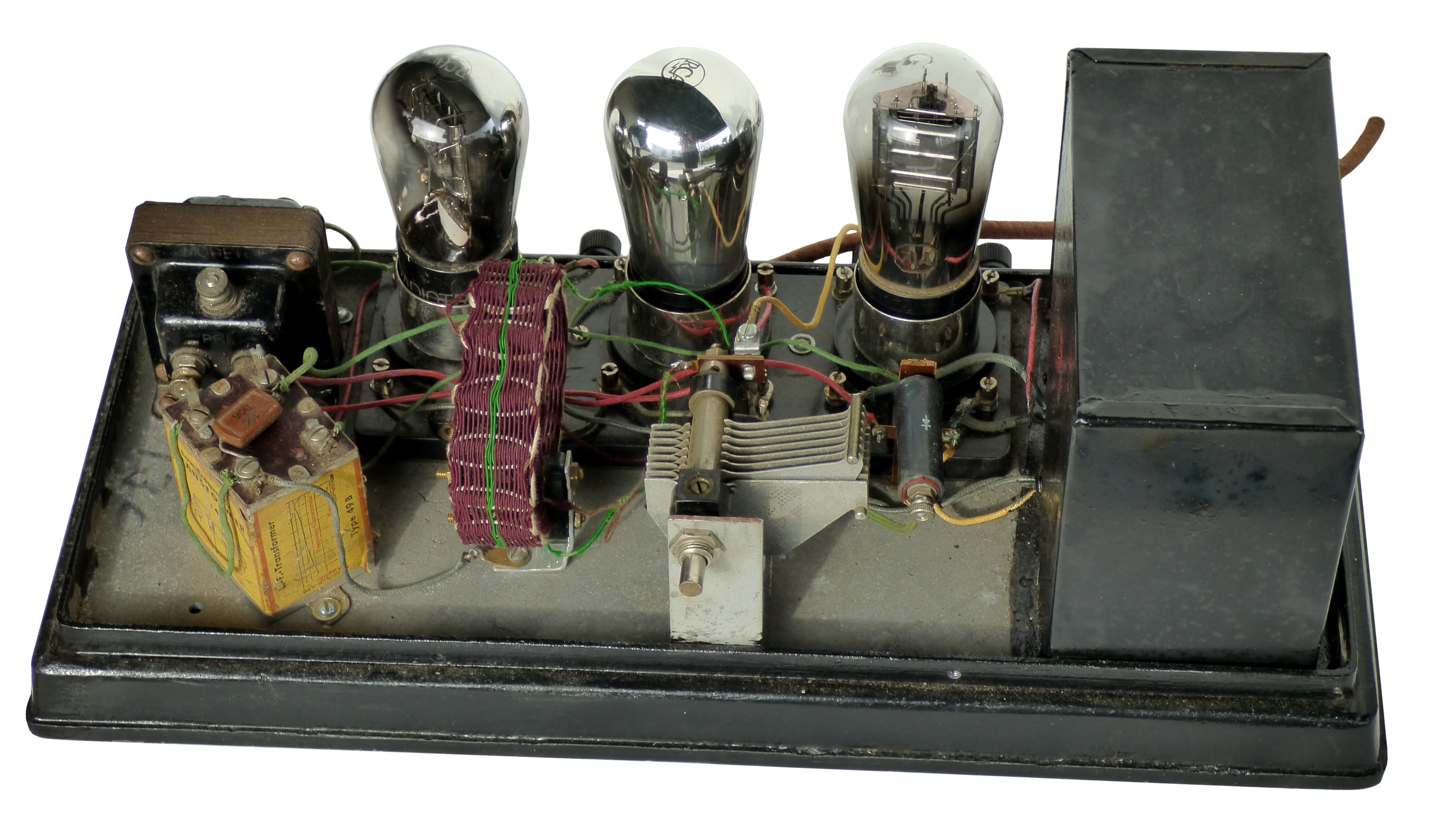
The first Courtenay radio (lid removed)

In 1930 he would produce his first commercial radio, a 'tin-box' three valve set with external speaker. It was very basic, but at £10/10/0, it was cheaper than most other offerings on the market at the time. It was retailed through Stewart Hardware Ltd on Courtenay Place, and called 'The Courtenay'. Their models would get more elaborate over the coming few years, and Stewart's would become the master agents for the brand.

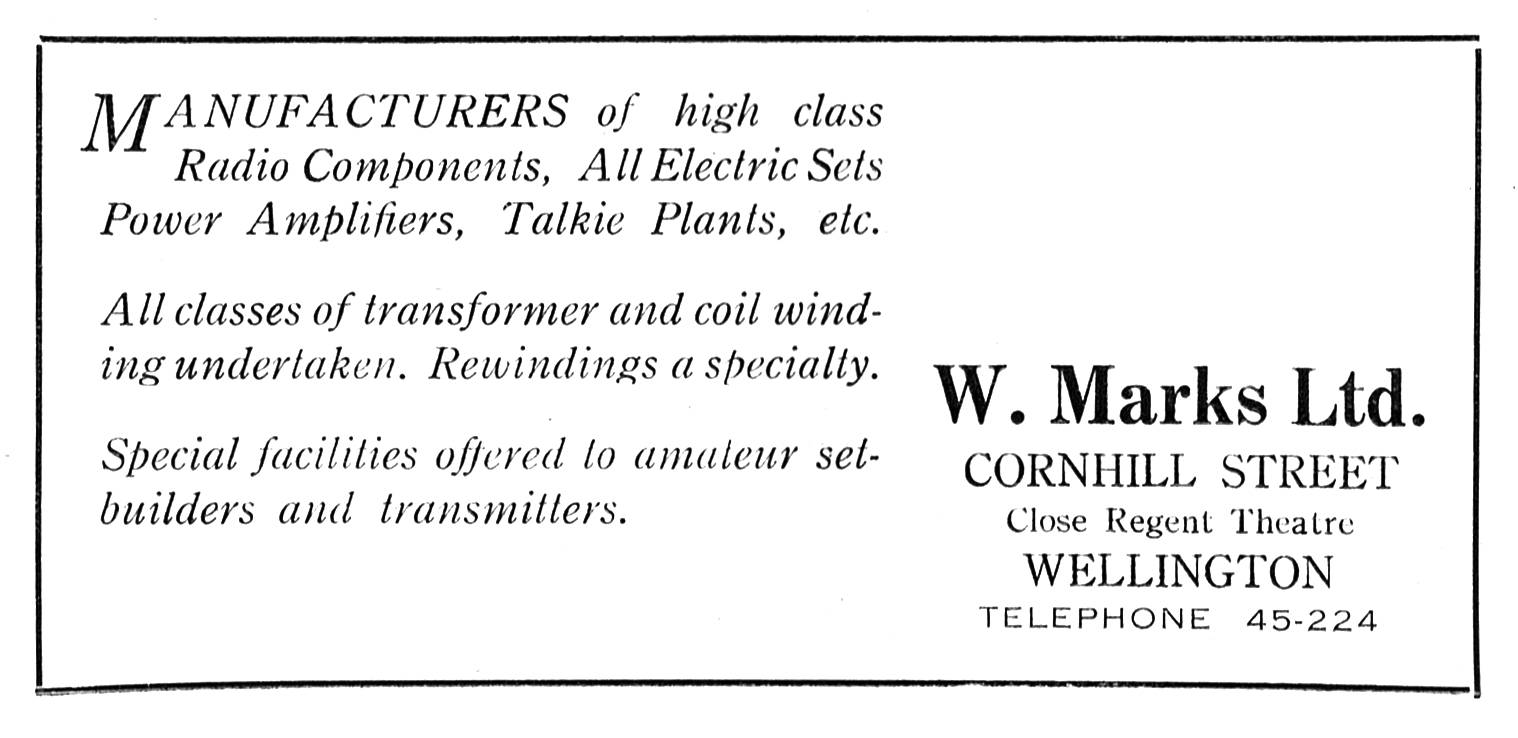
W Marks Ltd, early advertising

In 1931, he formalised the company as W. Marks Ltd, with 3000 shares. Marks himself held 2000, the remainder held by Ernie Ketko, who would be involved with the company for most of its history.

By 1932 his business had grown to nearly 50 staff, and production was said to be 500 sets per month. Marks would change the name of his firm to Radio Corporation (N.Z.) Ltd.

In 1933, Stewart Hardware—the major retailer of Marks' radios—went into liquidation. In response, Marks, together with A. (Arthur) Maurice Anderson (who was a public accountant, married into the Stewart family, and Stewart's liquidator), formed both Courtenay Radio Ltd and the Pacific Radio Company Ltd, Ltd—and took over the main Courtenay Place buildings belonging to Stewart's. This would allow Marks to maintain the continuity of the Courtenay brand he had been building over the previous three years. It's likely the Pacific brand was introduced to diversify sales and help protect against a similar problem in the future.

Around this time, Radio Corp would also begin manufacturing various other brands of radio for their respective owners, including Stella, CQ, Bellbird, Acme and Philips.

By 1936, the company had extended its financial reach to its limits, and so in December of that year, Marks created a public company with £80,000 capitol. The chairman of the board would be an ex-Speaker of the House of Representatives, Sir Charles Statham. William Marks would stay on as the Managing Director, running the day-to-day operations of the company.

One of the first tasks of the board was to reorganise the finances of the new company, which included streamlining their sales channels so that the factory retained more profit from the products they made—and this meant the manufacturing relationships they held with various companies would come to an end—something that would particularly affect the Stella and Pacific brands. Stella was owned by the nationwide electrical engineering firm, Cory-Wright & Salmon, and the Pacific Radio Company Ltd was now owned by A. Maurice Anderson. Both Silston Cory-Wright and Anderson were on the board of directors of Radio Corp, and they would both resign from the board following this decision.

=== Columbus Radio Centres ===
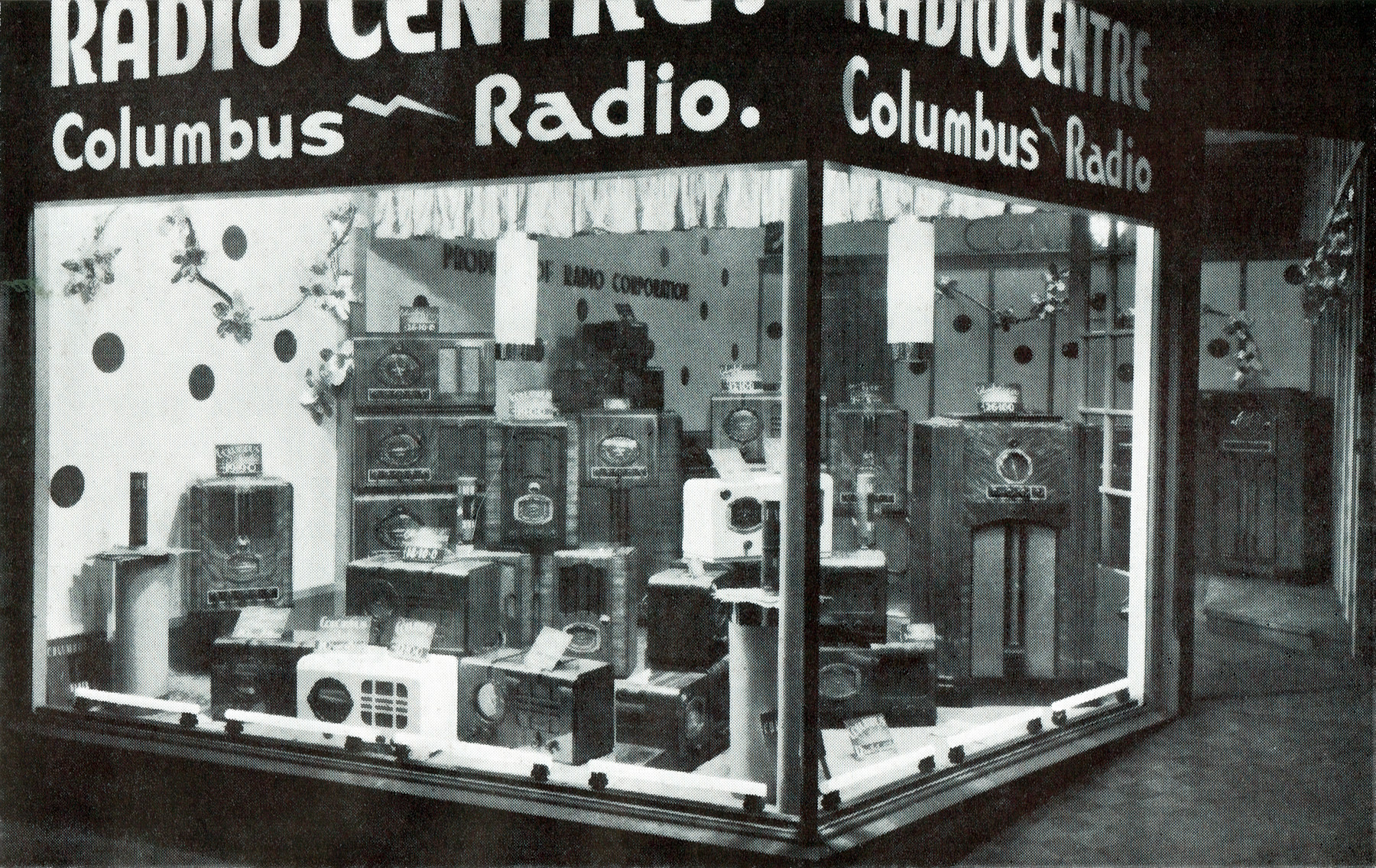
Columbus Radio Centre - Sydenham branch, 435 Colombo St, Christchurch, NZ (c.1938)

in 1937, the Radio Corporation of New Zealand introduced a new house brand, Columbus. At the same time, they opened a nationwide chain of Columbus Radio Centres to retail and service these new sets.

These stores were called Columbus Radio Centres and initially sold only Columbus radios. Later, the stores would retail other items, such as Pfaff sewing machines and TANZA records.

With the near-collapse of the company in 1959, and the takeover by Pye, the stores would be sold off to the Christchurch-based firm, Robert Francis Ltd, at which point they became more of a general appliance store, selling numerous brands including those of former competitors such as HMV and Bell.

=== Bandspreading ===
in about 1938, William Marks fielded a complaint from his wife - their radio was very hard to tune into the short wave stations from her former home in Russia - and once tuned, the radio would need to be retuned regularly. Indeed, this was common of radios from the era. He relayed this complaint to one of his senior engineers, Kem Collett, who thought he could do something about it. Kem modified an existing set using a technique used in amateur radio called bandspreading - something generally considered too expensive to implement in a domestic radio.

Over the next year, the lab staff would discover ways to make it more cost-effective, and give it rock solid stability. It would go into production in late 1939 for sale in 1940 as the model 75 - believed to be a world-first affordable domestic calibrated bandspread radio (although there were the high-end and very expensive RCA HF series radios with bandspreading from 1938).

=== World War Two ===
In 1942, the New Zealand government would institute the Radio-Manufacturing Control Notice. This meant that factories were effectively banned from making radios, and had to switch to war production. Radio Corp would make a wide range of products including Sten Guns, EPS (Emergency Precautions Scheme) helmets, two different models of amenities receiver (the AEW1 and AEW2), and the ZC1 military transceiver.

=== Post war activities ===
With the resumption of peace, the company would pick up where they left off in 1942, producing models they had previously developed mixed with some new designs. They also developed a large roadshow that filled an entire railcar, and was first shown off at the Christchurch Industries Fair in 1946.

=== RACOL ===
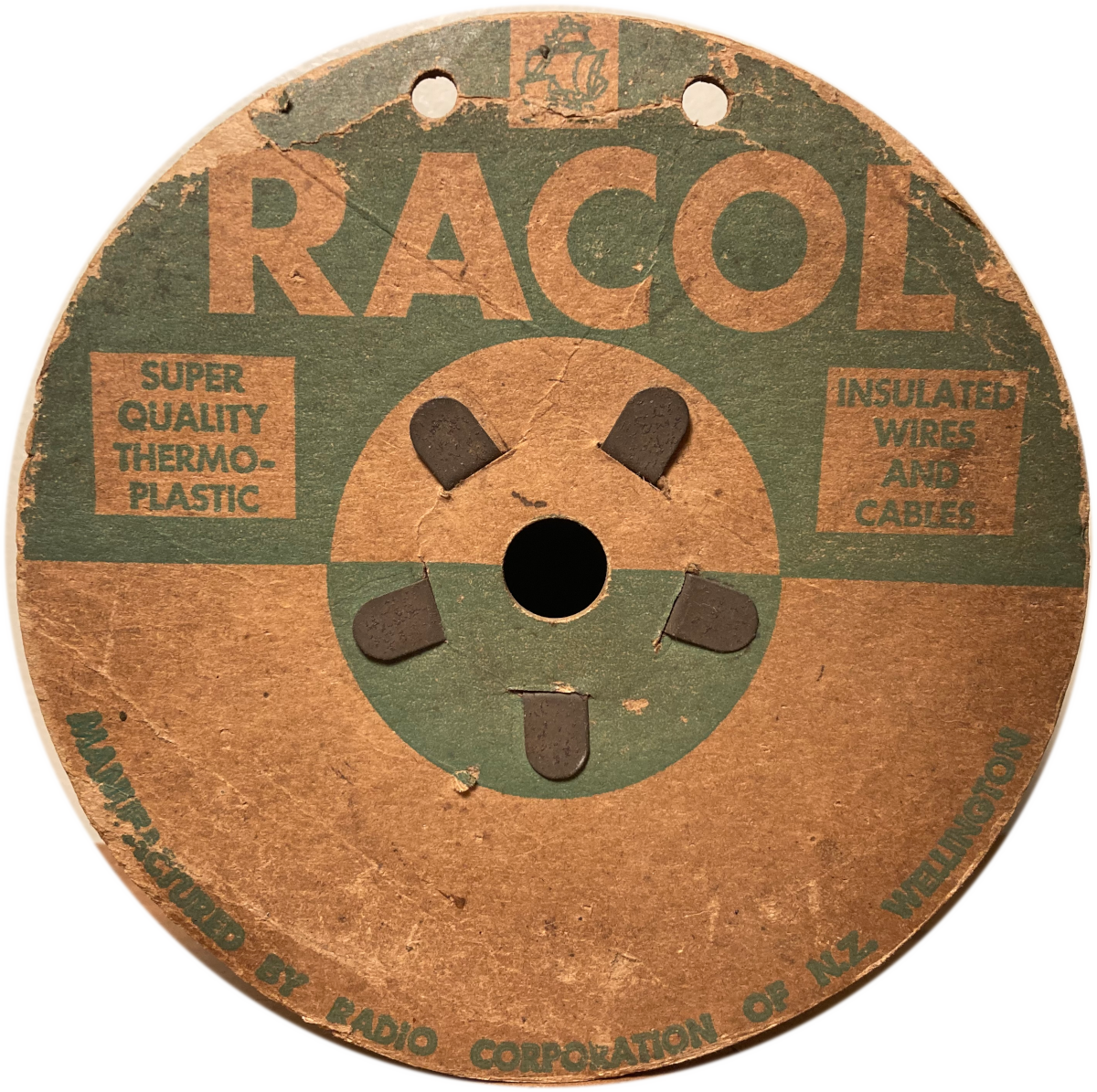
RACOL wire from the Radio Corporation of New Zealand

One of the key products set up in 1946 was a wire manufacturing plant, under the new brand RACOL. This plant (including a machine for encapsulating wire in PVC insulation and another for overbraiding several wires together) was purchased as part of a large buying trip to England following the war's end by works manager, Fred Green.

The RACOL line would survive not only two changes of ownership of the company, but several subsequent brand owners—on into the present day.

=== Three deaths ===
1946 would also see the deaths of three prominent members of the company: The chairman of the board, Sir Charles Statham, board member Colonel George John Smith and the founder of the company, William Marks. Marks' son, Alex (who had worked closely with his father over the previous few years), would take over the Managing Director role.

=== TANZA ===
Originally intended as a way to pre-record advertising, the company set up a recording studio at 262 Wakefield St, just along the road from the main Radio Corp buildings, which extended from their shop front on Courtenay Place, through the block to Wakefield St. But they soon began recording music, and in 1948, their first album would be released—Blue Smoke. This first record was very well received by the New Zealand public, selling over 50,000 copies, quite an achievement for a new label in such a small country. The record label, TANZA, was an acronym for 'To Assist New Zealand Artists'.

=== End of Marks family involvement ===
By 1950, clashes with the board would see Alex Marks sent to England as the company buyer—which some staff members reportedly called an 'exile'. This was seen by many in the firm as a betrayal of the company's founding family, and many key staff members would leave in the coming few years. Alex himself would leave while in England, taking up a senior position with Fletcher Construction in their London office.

=== AWA ===
With their technical capacity severely diminished by departing staff, in 1955 an arrangement was drawn up between AWA in Australia and Radio Corp in New Zealand, in which AWA designs and technical assistance would be provided. Several small plastic AWA models would be released and sold over the coming few years, with almost no difference between the Australian and New Zealand models apart from the badge and station names on the dial.

=== [Pye (N.Z.) Ltd] ===
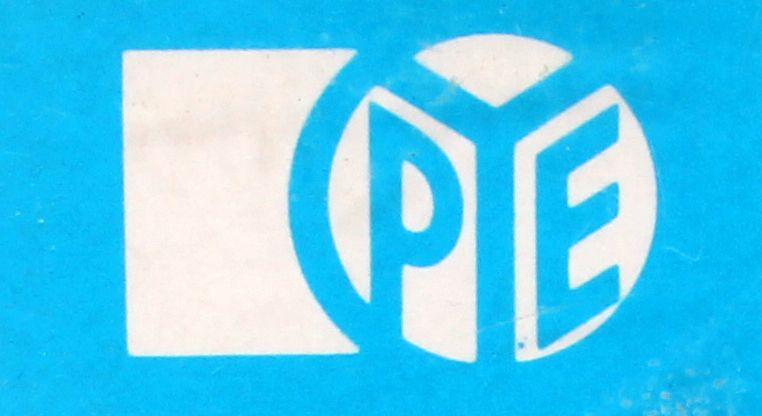
Pye logo

In 1959, with the threat of liquidation looming, shareholders accepted a buyout offer from Pye (NZ) Ltd. Pye would, within a few years, cease all of Radio Corp's operations, apart from the RACOL wire manufacturing plant, and the old Stewarts buildings which had been home to the company since 1933 would be known as the Pye Electronics Ltd. Wire Division.

== Brands manufactured ==
=== Courtenay ===
The first brand, dating to 1930. Originally, these were sold by Stewart Hardware in Courtenay Place, Wellington—then when Stewart Hardware went out of business in 1933, Courtenay Radio Ltd was formed to retail the radios (still in the same Courtenay Place location), and finally retailing was taken over by one of New Zealand's largest electrical engineering firms, Turnbull & Jones Ltd. The Courtenay brand was retired in the mid-50s.

=== Columbus ===
The Columbus name was originally used as their export brand, but after a brief and unsuccessful foray into Australian retailing, those efforts were abandoned. The Columbus name was then used in New Zealand, sold in Columbus Radio Centres nationwide. After the takeover in 1959, Pye would continue to produce Columbus sets, predominantly stereograms—but also some mantle sets. They would retire the Columbus name in the early 1960s.

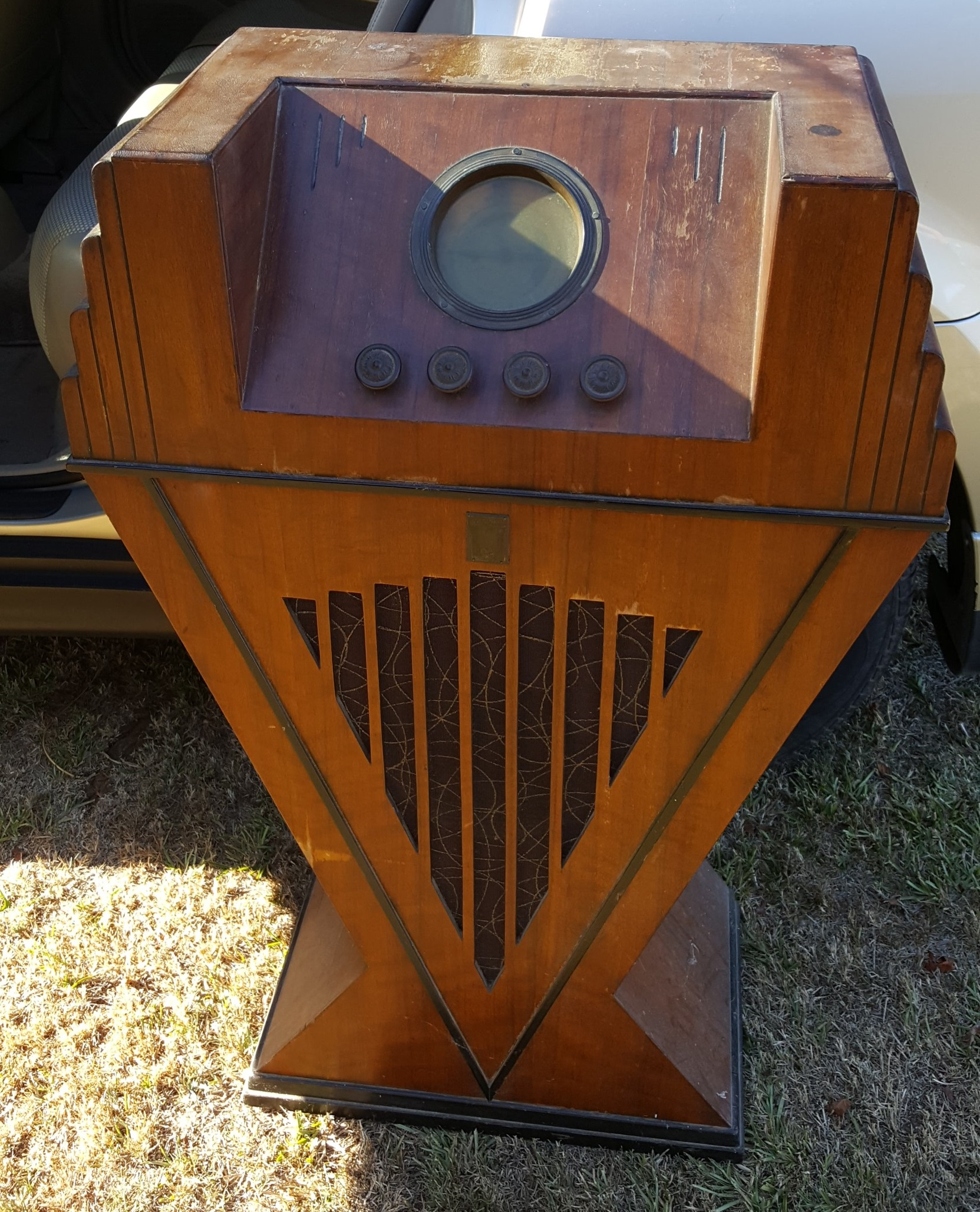
1934 Pacific Elite, 6-valve dual-wave radio

=== Pacific ===
Pacific was formed in 1933 by William Marks & A. Maurice Anderson (and initially owned by Radio Corp) as part of the diversification of his sales channels, the Pacific Radio Company Ltd was sold to Anderson in 1934.

Anderson, a Public Accountant, was the liquidator of Stewart Hardware (and married to Christina Stewart, daughter of Charles Stewart, the owner)—and is noted in the Articles of Incorporation of the Radio Corporation of New Zealand as the link that enabled Radio Corp to take over the premises of Stewart Hardware in 1933 with a favourable lease. He would also be a founding board member of the Radio Corporation of New Zealand.

Pacific Radio designs were initially quite plain, but by 1935 were perhaps some of the most art deco designs available—certainly in New Zealand. One model in particular, the Elite, is today a highly-sought-after collectible the world over.

1937 would be the final year of Radio Corp production for all brands except for the two they owned (Courtenay and Columbus)—and as a consequence, Anderson would resign from the board and close his company. The Pacific name and branding would be picked up by one of the other major New Zealand manufacturers, Akrad Radio Ltd in Waihi. They would produce Pacific Radios until the mid-1950s, when the brand was retired.

=== Stella ===
Introduced in 1934 by Cory-Wright & Salmon Ltd, a nationwide Electrical Engineering firm. Their first sets would feature a dial with features not seen on other sets for at least a year—a full-vision large display with station ID's as well as the frequency scale.

Like the other brands, the manufacturing arrangement with Radio Corp would end in 1937. For a few more years, Cory-Wright & Salmon would have sets made by another major New Zealand manufacturer, Collier & Beale. This new arrangement did not last long though, and the brand seems to have ceased to exist by the start of WW2.

=== CQ ===
Owned by Hope Gibbons Ltd, originally a bicycle retailer in the lower North Island. Hope Gibbons would go on to be New Zealand agents for Stewart Warner, and according to board meeting notes, discontinued their CQ radio line in early 1937. They likely did not see the need for a local brand, as prices for imported sets had dropped to an almost equal footing by 1937—but the government would soon introduce a ban on imported sets, so even this avenue would be closed to them. There is no record of any other radio retailing activities by the company after this.

=== Philips ===
An office for retailing Philips radios was opened in New Zealand in 1927, but by the early 1930s the market was demanding radios with Superheterodyne capabilities—something Philips did not have. They turned to Radio Corp to build them a suitable line of radios, and in 1934 the first three models (5H, 5V and 6V) were released to supplement their imported line. Philips would have models made through until 1936, when they opened their first factory in Wellington and began to make their own radios.

=== Acme ===
This seems to have been a short-run brand, sold by auction houses in Wellington. The designs appear to have been standard models, and even the cabinets were similar to Courtenay branded models of the time. The brand itself barely lasted a year and examples do not show up often.

=== Audiola ===
Sold by Audiola Radio in Willis St, Wellington. Very few examples appear today.

=== Bellbird ===
Bellbird radios were made for Wyn Billing Ltd in 1933. From 1934, Wyn appears to have made his own radios, possibly in the old W. Marks Ltd premises in Cornhill St. The business was known as The Billings Radio Construction Company Ltd, and also seems to have been tied up with the Moderne brand and its owner, 'Mack' MacDonald.
