= Ipswich Uniting Church =

- Ipswich Central Mission; Wesley Uniting Church; Wesleyan Chapel; Ellenborough Street Methodist Church; Ipswich City Uniting Church
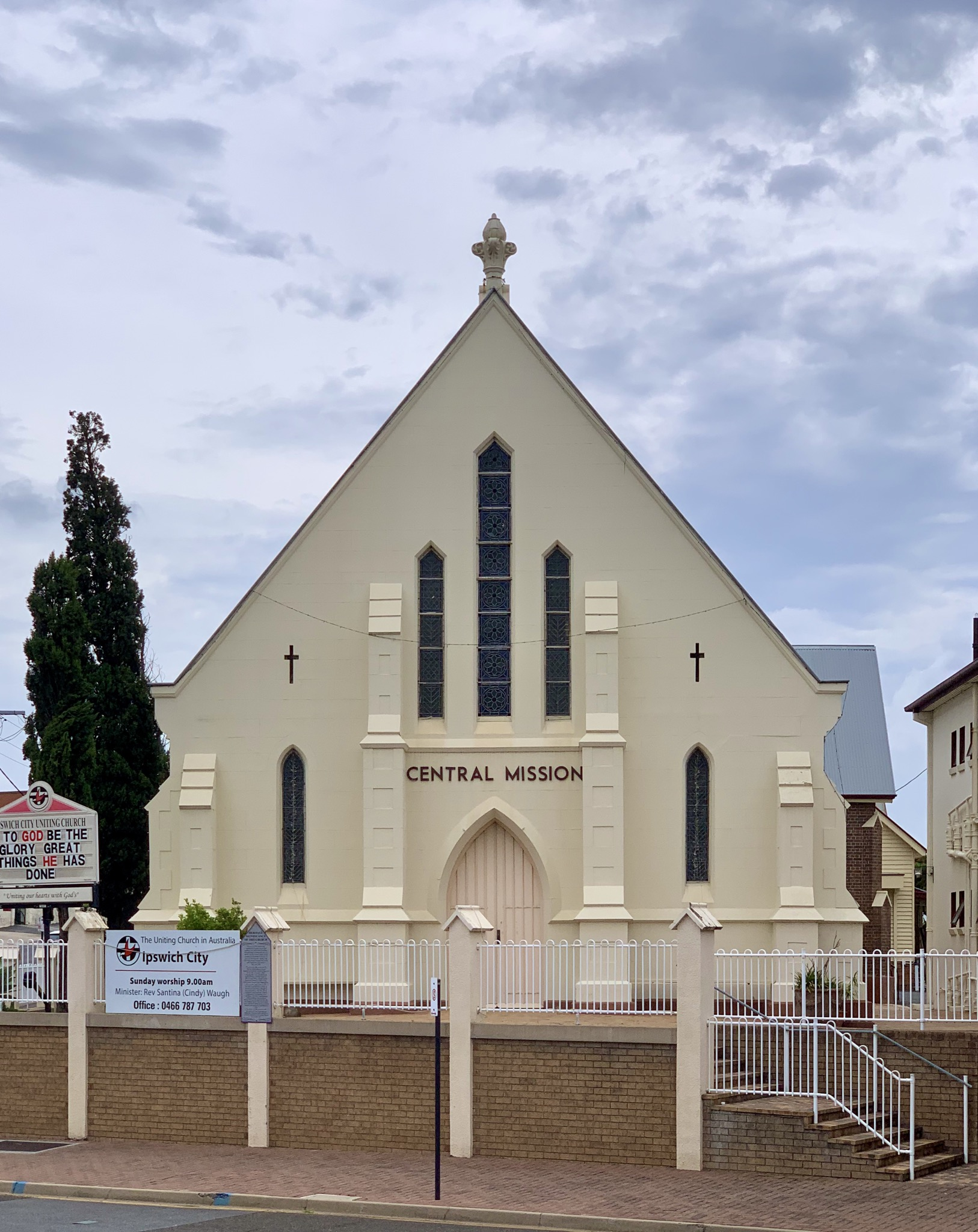
- Church eastern facade, 2020
- Ipswich Uniting Church
- 27°36′53″S 152°45′26″E
- Address: Ellenborough Street, Ipswich, City of Ipswich, Queensland
- Country: Australia
- Denomination: Uniting (since 1977)
- Previous denomination: Methodist
- Website: ipswichuc.org.au

History
- Status: Church
- Dedicated: June 1858

Architecture
- Functional status: Active
- Architects: Samuel Shenton (1858); Benjamin Backhouse (1863); Henry Wyman (1892)
- Architectural type: Church
- Style: Gothic Revival
- Years built: 1858–1892

Specifications
- Materials: Brick; corrugated iron

Administration
- Parish: Ipswich

Queensland Heritage Register
- Official name: Ipswich Central Mission – Wesleyan Chapel, Ellenborough Street Church, Ipswich City Uniting Church, Original name: Wesleyan Chapel
- Type: State heritage (built)
- Designated: 21 October 1992
- Reference no.: 600578
- Significant period: 1858, 1863, 1892 (fabric); 1954, 1977 (historical)
- Significant components: Stained glass window/s, memorial – window, gallery, pipe organ, furniture/fittings, memorial – plaque
- Builders: Samuel Shenton

Ipswich Uniting Church is a heritage-listed Uniting church at Ellenborough Street, Ipswich, City of Ipswich, Queensland, Australia. It was designed and built by Samuel Shenton in 1858. It is also known as Ipswich Central Mission, Wesleyan Chapel, Ellenborough Street Methodist Church, and Ipswich City Uniting Church. It was added to the Queensland Heritage Register on 21 October 1992.

== History ==
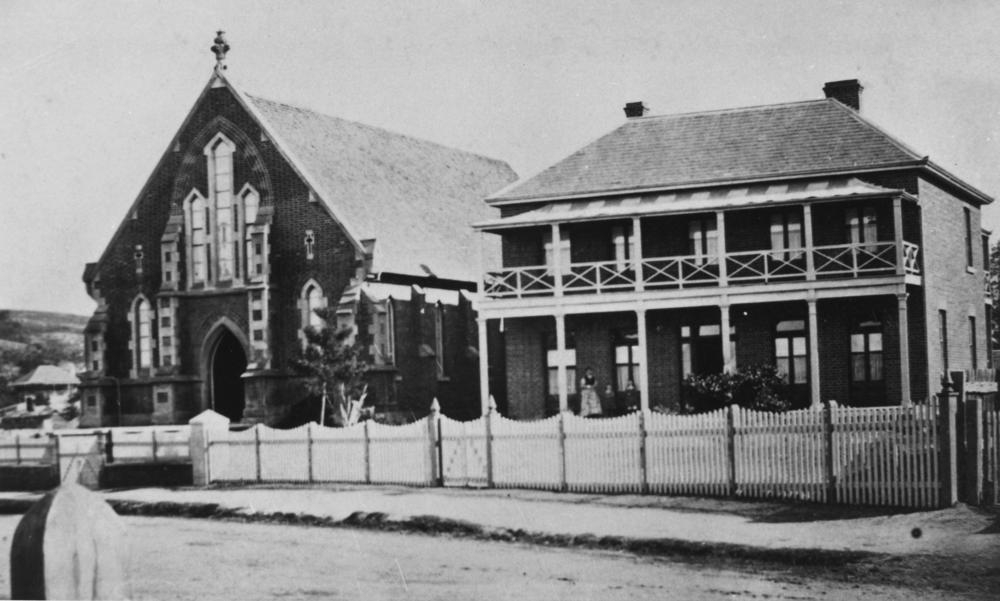
Methodist Church (left) and parsonage (right), c. 1870.

The Ipswich Uniting Church is a brick church, the first section of which was built in 1858 as the Wesleyan Chapel. The original design was possibly by the contractor Samuel Shenton who later practised as an architect. The chapel was extended in 1863 to the design of Benjamin Backhouse and in 1892 to the design of Henry Wyman.

It is the oldest church (in continuous use as a church) in Queensland and is one of a very small number of churches in the state which pre-date the separation of Queensland.

The first Wesleyan services in Ipswich were conducted by Rev William Moore in 1848, using buildings such as the Court House. Moore rode from Brisbane to Ipswich and back to conduct the services. A timber chapel was built in 1849 facing Limestone Street, on land granted to the church.

A brick chapel was built in 1858 by Samuel Shenton, facing Ellenborough St. It was extended to the east in 1863 to a design by Benjamin Backhouse, the extension including a gallery with seating for 130 people. In 1892, north and south transepts and a vestry were added, designed by Henry Wyman and built by Perry and Betts.

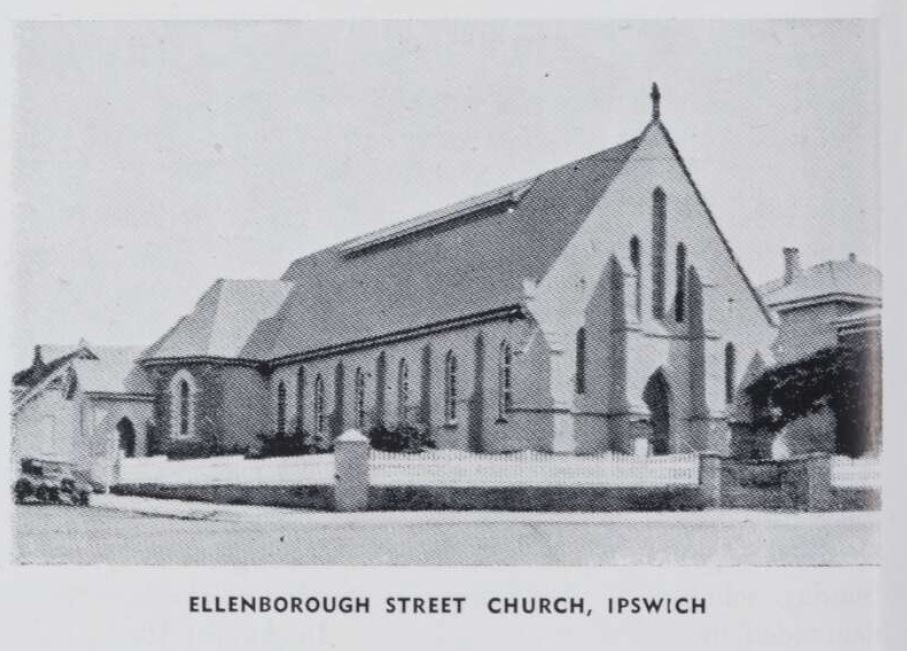
Ellenborough Street Methodist Church, 1947

The church was renovated to celebrate its 75th anniversary in 1923 and again to celebrate its centenary in 1948. A side porch was added in 1924. A brick and steel fence was erected on the east and south sides of the church in the 1980s, designed by architect Jim Armstrong. A major conservation project was carried out in 1990 by Buchanan Architects. The pipe organ was installed in 1905 and rebuilt in 1977.

A two-storey parsonage was built by Samuel Shenton to the north of the church in 1864. The building was damaged by fire in 1920 and subsequently renovated, then was extended forward and very extensively altered in 1958 to convert it to offices known as Wyvern House.

The present-day Sunday School Hall was built in 1877, extended in 1897 and remodelled in 1938 and 1967. The Young Men's Hall was built in 1921 and renovated in 1948. The second parsonage, now used as a day respite care centre, was built in 1958, architect Fred Scorer.

The church as an organisation has been a major influence in the Ipswich community, particularly since 1954 when it changed its name to Ipswich Central Mission and became more oriented towards community service. It initiated a number of significant social welfare programs including Ipswich Blue Nursing Service. Light Industries sheltered workshops, Lifeline crisis help service, three aged persons complexes and a day respite centre. It also gave support to establishment of Ipswich Senior Citizens centre and care for "street kids" in the city.

Originally a Wesleyan Chapel, the church later became a Methodist church, then in 1977 became part of the Uniting Church in Australia.

== Description ==
The church is a simple Wesleyan Chapel extended at the eastern end to provide an entrance lobby and side rooms with gallery above, and at the western end to form a sanctuary and transepts.

The Gothic Revival form includes a steeply-gabled roof clad in corrugated galvanised iron and with a timber louvred roof ridge ventilator. The earlier portions of the building are of painted rendered brickwork with projecting buttresses and tall lancet windows. The rear portion is of English bond face brickwork with painted window and door dressings, string courses, gable decoration and buttress cappings. Window sills are of painted sandstone and the plinth to the walls is of painted rendered sandstone.

Internally, the floor is of hoop pine and the walls are painted plaster. The roof is supported on scissor beams and purlins with pine boards laid diagonally from ridge to eaves. Steel tie-rods connect the bases of each pair of scissor beams.

At the eastern end of the church there is an upper gallery built as the choir stalls and organ loft. The gallery is of timber construction with a stepped timber floor supported on cast iron columns and reached by a small staircase from the entrance foyer.

The sanctuary located at the western end dominates the interior, with a raised pulpit, organ pipes and elaborate stained glass window. Various marble memorial tablets have been placed on the side walls, while the church has many fine stained and coloured glass windows, most of which are memorials.

The built-in joinery work, notably around the sanctuary end of the church and the gallery balustrading, is well-detailed. The earlier work is constructed in cedar and pine while later work around the front entry porch including a panelled dado and screen is of silky oak. The most recent work such as hymn directory boards are in Queensland maple. The pews are of traditional design in pine.

The church occupies a prominent corner position in the city and is seen above a contemporary brick wall, metal fence and painted pilasters. Other buildings on the site are either of recent origin or are early buildings which have been severely modified and extended.

== Heritage listing ==
Ipswich Central Mission - Wesleyan Chapel was listed on the Queensland Heritage Register on 21 October 1992 having satisfied the following criteria.

The place is important in demonstrating the evolution or pattern of Queensland's history.

The place demonstrates the development of churches in Queensland and the desire of residents to build substantial structures to replace their original rudimentary places of worship.

The place demonstrates rare, uncommon or endangered aspects of Queensland's cultural heritage.

Completed in June 1858, the Ipswich Uniting Church is the oldest surviving church in continuous use in Queensland and the oldest Uniting Church in Queensland; it is a rare example of a church built prior to Separation.

The place is important in demonstrating the principal characteristics of a particular class of cultural places.

Its form, structure, furnishings, memorial tablets and windows demonstrate the principal characteristics of a Protestant church building.

The place is important because of its aesthetic significance.

The place is a fine example of a simple Gothic Revival church building and demonstrates aesthetic characteristics valued by the community. Its prominent corner position at a bend in a major road make it a local landmark and it is one of a group of important historic buildings in central Ipswich.

The place has a strong or special association with a particular community or cultural group for social, cultural or spiritual reasons.

The place has a strong association with the Ipswich community through its social welfare programs, and with important organisations initiated by it such as Ipswich Blue Nurses and Ipswich Lifeline.

The place has a special association with the life or work of a particular person, group or organisation of importance in Queensland's history.

It has a special association with the life and work of important early architects Benjamin Backhouse and Henry Wyman, and with builder/architect Samuel Shenton.
