= Les Wilson =

Les Wilson may refer to:

- Les Wilson (baseball) (1885–1969), American baseball player
- Les Wilson (field hockey) (born 1952), New Zealand field hockey player
- Les Wilson (musician) (1924–1997), New Zealand country music singer and songwriter, also known as "The Otago Rambler"
- Les Wilson (soccer) (born 1947), Canadian soccer administrator and former professional player

== See also ==
- Leslie Wilson (disambiguation)
