= Blue Smoke (song) =

Single by Pixie Williams and the Ruru Karaitiana Quintette
- B-side: "Señorita"
- Released: June 26, 1949
- Recorded: October 1948
- Length: 2:59
- Label: TANZA
- Songwriter(s): Ruru Karaitiana
- Producer(s): Stanley Dallas

"Blue Smoke" (also known by its Māori name of "Kohu Auwahi") is a 1949 song written by Ruru Karaitiana and performed by Pixie Williams. Karaitiana wrote the song in 1940 while serving in World War Two as part of the 28th Māori Battalion, with the song being performed by the battalion's concert party throughout the war. After unsuccessfully trying to sell the song to recording companies in London, Karaitiana recorded the song after his return to New Zealand, with a quintet he had assembled the previous year as backing for Pixie Williams on vocals.

Upon its release, "Blue Smoke" became the first commercial record ever produced and recorded entirely in New Zealand, and the first record of the TANZA (To Assist New Zealand Artists) label. The song attracted considerable interest within New Zealand, topping radio charts for six weeks and selling over 20,000 copies in its first year alone and over 50,000 total. This, along with the song's position as the first to be locally produced and recorded, has caused "Blue Smoke" to develop a strong legacy in the years since its release, with its creators inducted into the New Zealand Music Hall of Fame in 2019.

== Writing and composition ==
Ruru Karaitiana first wrote "Blue Smoke" in 1940 while on board the RMS Aquitania, which was being used as a troop transport to carry New Zealand soldiers to World War Two. While crossing the Indian Ocean, a sergeant pointed out to Karaitiana that the ship's blue smoke was heading "in the right direction" – back towards New Zealand. Karaitiana later described this encounter as having "put the song in [his] lap", with it being turned into song lyrics by some accounts as quickly as within half an hour. The words were set to a melody which Karaitiana had been working on prior to his deployment, noted for its superficial similarities to that of the 1928 song "Carolina Moon". The song was originally written in Karaitiana's first language of te reo Māori, before being rewritten with English lyrics while he was on leave in London.

== Early performances ==
"Blue Smoke" was first performed within a day or two of being written, as part of a concert on board the Aquitania. After failing to sell the song to record companies upon his arrival in London, Karaitiana continued to perform the song as part of the Māori Battalion's concert band. "Blue Smoke" went on to be performed at concerts throughout the war, particularly during the North African campaign, and continued to be performed by military bands after Karaitiana returned home. The song is believed to have been introduced to New Zealand by soldiers returning from the conflict — including Karaitiana himself — becoming heavily associated with returning soldiers and a theme for those coming home.

The oldest known recording of "Blue Smoke" dates to June 1945, and is of the Otago University Capping Sextet performing the song as part of Capping week celebrations. This recording was produced by the New Zealand Broadcasting Service for broadcast on the Far East Network in the Pacific Theatre alongside other performances from the same celebrations, and was discovered in 2019 on the reverse of a recording of Hitler's death being announced in an assembly at Dunedin's Kings High School. Prior to the discovery of this recording, the earliest recorded version was believed to be of the singer Jean Ngeru performing it in 1946 for a NZBS mobile recording unit based in Hāwera, with several other radio recordings existing from the late 1940s. These early versions were varied in their musical structure: the Capping Sextet were accompanied by a piano and trumpet, while Ngeru's version played "Blue Smoke" as a guitar-backed waltz.

== Ruru Karaitiana Quintette recording ==
"Blue Smoke" steadily gained popularity in New Zealand throughout the second half of the war and the years immediately after, owing in part to Karaitiana's performances of the song at dance halls and marae across the lower North Island. In 1947, sheet music for a piano arrangement by George Winchester was published by the music store Begg's, with Karaitiana often playing the song in the Wellington branch.

At the same time, recently established record label TANZA (To Assist New Zealand Artists) was searching for a local artist to record a song in their new Wellington recording studios, following a falling out between His Master's Voice and TANZA's parent company, the Radio Corporation of New Zealand. "Blue Smoke" was a logical choice, due to the song's profile and Karaitiana living in Wellington at the time. Having recently assembled a quintet for performances around the region, Karaitiana agreed and set about preparing for the recording process. To give the recording a Hawaiian feel, he asked local lap steel guitarist Jim Carter to appear on the record, while for vocals Karaitiana approached Pixie Williams at the suggestion of his fiancée, Joan. Williams, who was 19 at the time, turned down Karaitiana twice before agreeing to appear on the recording. Recording eventually took place over seven days in October 1948, made more difficult by a lack of soundproofing in the studio and loud machinery operating nearby. The record was eventually processed in February 1949, with advance copies distributed to radio stations and press ahead of being released to the public in June 1949 with a souvenir label noting its status as the first record entirely processed in New Zealand.

== Release and reception ==
Upon its release, "Blue Smoke" was instantly well received, topping New Zealand charts for six weeks and selling over 50,000 copies. This was despite being sold in limited locations due to the ongoing dispute between RCNZ and His Master's Voice. Williams' emotional vocals have been cited as a key contributor to this success, resonating with the postwar attitude of the nation who still associated the song with soldiers returning from the war. The song also attracted overseas success, being performed by a variety of British and American artists including Webster Booth and Anne Ziegler, Al Morgan, and Dean Martin. In 1951, "Blue Smoke" was rated amongst the fastest selling music in the United States, and in 1952 Karaitiana became the first New Zealander to be awarded by the Australasian Performing Right Association (APRA) for sales figures, a sum of £25 at the time.

== Legacy ==
The position of "Blue Smoke" as the first locally produced and processed record has afforded it a unique place within New Zealand's cultural identity, with music historian Chris Bourke describing it as a "big bang moment" for New Zealand music. The song has continued to attract attention since its release, and in 2001 was included on the Nature's Best compilation album as one of the 30 best New Zealand songs of all time by APRA. In 2011, RIANZ certified "Blue Smoke" with a triple-platinum award for its sales, while in 2019 Karaitiana, Williams, and Carter were inducted into the New Zealand Music Hall of Fame. Beyond the induction, 2019 also saw a range of events to celebrate the 70th anniversary of the song's release, including a commemoration at the National Library and the production of a documentary about Pixie Williams. "Blue Smoke" has lent its name to several productions about early New Zealand music, including a book, podcast, and a tribute recording of Williams' music, as well as a music venue in Christchurch. "Blue Smoke" has also appeared on the soundtracks of several movies since its release, including Out of the Blue and An Angel at My Table, and lends its tune to the official waiata of Massey University.
