= Take a Number =

Studio album by Mavis Rivers
- Released: 1959
- Recorded: 1959
- Genre: Jazz
- Label: Capitol – T1210
- Producer: Andy Wiswell

Mavis Rivers chronology
Take a Number (1959)	Hooray for Love (1960)

Take a Number is the debut album by New Zealand and Polynesian jazz singer Mavis Rivers. It was arranged by Nelson Riddle and released in 1959.

== Reception ==
Professional ratings
Review scores
Source	Rating
Allmusic	3/5 stars

The initial Billboard magazine review from May 18, 1959 commented that "Polynesian canary Mavis Rivers lends her expressive jazz-flavored thrushing style to a group of "number" selections...Spinnable wax".

== Track listing ==
1. "One Minute to One" (J. Fred Coots, Sam M. Lewis) – 2:32
2. "Two Loves Have I" – 4:03
3. "Three Coins in the Fountain" (Sammy Cahn, Jule Styne) – 3:12
4. "Four A.M." (L. Coleman) – 3:02
5. "Five O'Clock Whistle" (Kim Gannon, Gene Irwin, Josef Myrow) – 2:06
6. "Six Lessons from Madame La Zonga" (James V. Monaco) – 2:52
7. "Seven-League Boots" – 2:46
8. "Dinner at Eight" (Dorothy Fields, Jimmy McHugh) – 3:31
9. "About a Quarter to Nine" (Al Dubin, Harry Warren) – 3:05
10. "One the Ten O' Ten" (J. Fred Coots) – 2:20
11. "At the Eleventh Hour" – 3:01
12. "It's Twelve O'Clock" (Coots) – 3:34

== Personnel ==
- Mavis Rivers – vocals
- Nelson Riddle – arranger
- Andy Wiswell – producer
