= Esme Stephens =

- Birth name: Esme Paula Stephens
- Born: 5 July 1923; Auckland, New Zealand
- Died: 2 June 1992 (aged 68); Auckland, New Zealand
- Genres: Jazz
- Instrument: Vocals
- Years active: 1943–
- Labels: His Master's Voice, Stebbing, Zodiac Records

Esme Stephens was a New Zealand jazz singer who was the vocalist on the first pop disc recorded in New Zealand by His Master's Voice and on the first multi-track recording in New Zealand.

== Biography ==
Esme was born in Auckland, where she spent the entirety of her life. At the age of 17, Esme auditioned to appear on jazz musician Theo Walters' 1ZB radio show. When Artie Shaw visited Auckland in 1943, he was asked to add a female vocalist to some recordings, and the radio producer involved contacted Esme. The group recorded renditions of White Christmas and This Love of Mine which were pressed on an Acetate disc. During World War II, Esme performed live extensively in and around Auckland with artists such as Freddie Gore, Len Hawkins and Dale Alderton. In the late 1940's, Esme recorded for HMV what is considered the first pop record recorded in the country titled 'You Can In Yucatan', originally performed by Desi Arnaz and His Orchestra. Esme was later signed by Stebbing Records, where she recorded several 78 rpm records during the studio's short history. She appeared on these records alongside artists such as Julian Lee, Buddy Kaine, Crombie Murdoch and jazz singer Mavis Rivers. In 1952, she was the vocalist on the first multi-track recording in New Zealand, a cover of The Andrews Sisters hit "Between Two Trees". She was accompanied by the Guitars of Buddy Kaine.

== Personal life ==
Esme married Dale Alderton, a musician whom she had played alongside for most of her career. Esme died on 2 June 1992 at the age of 68. She was buried at Waikumete Cemetery under her maiden name.
