= The Tumbleweeds =

New Zealand country and western group

- Also known as: Cole Wilson And The Tumbleweeds, Cole Wilson And His Tumbleweeds, Colin McCrorie's Kalua Islanders
- Origin: Dunedin, New Zealand
- Genres: Country music
- Years active: 1949–1993
- Labels: TANZA, Viking
- Past members: Cole Wilson (vocals, guitar); Bill Ditchfield (double bass); Nola Hewitt (vocals, mandolin, ukulele); Myra Hewitt (vocals, steel guitar); Colin McCrorie (vocals, lap steel); Doug Reeve (double bass)

The Tumbleweeds, sometimes billed as Cole Wilson And His Tumbleweeds, were a New Zealand country and western group founded in Dunedin in 1949. The band are considered among the major pioneers of New Zealand country music. They were amongst the first to perform and record country music in New Zealand with their cover of Gussie Davis's standard "Maple on the Hill" reportedly selling over 80,000 copies, making it one of New Zealand's most sold singles of all time and equivalent to a double-platinum disc.

The band formed in March 1949 after bassist Bill Ditchfield for the group The Hawaiian Serenaders was inspired to start a country music band when he heard one of the stage show dancers, Nola Hewitt, sing a rendition of "Maple on the Hill". Bill was joined by Nola and her sister Myra, who was also a stage show dancer, as well as two other members of his group, Cole Wilson and lap steel guitarist Colin McCrorie. The band played regularly on the Dunedin radio station 4YA, where they caught the attention of the TANZA record label in Wellington, who invited them to record at their studio. Six records were recorded during this stay and another seven in 1950. Also at this time they recorded four records of Hawaiian-inspired exotica under the name Colin McCrorie's Kalua Islanders. "Maple on the Hill" became a New Zealand hit, becoming a staple of country music repertoires in the country. It was one of a string of popular songs released by the band in the 1940s and 1950s. In 1952 Wilson married Myra Hewitt in a double wedding with Colin McCrorie and Myra's sister, Nola. In 1957 the band were signed by the New Zealand label Viking Records and from 1958 to 1965 the band recorded eight LP records for Viking.

The group toured as part of The Tumbleweeds Show, similar to the Slim Dusty Travelling Show in Australia. Recording was also done at Colin McCrorie's home at 181 Signal Hill Road in Opoho Dunedin. They continued to perform regularly until Cole Wilson's death in 1993.

The band were inducted into the New Zealand Country Music Hall of Fame in 1988, and hand impressions in cement were added to Gore's Gold Guitar Awards "Hands of Fame" walk in 1991.

== Discography ==
=== Studio albums ===
- Country Songs (Viking, 1958)
- Country Songs - Volume 2 (Viking, 1959)
- Country Songs - Volume 3 (Viking, 1959)
- Country Songs - Volume 4 (Viking, 1959)
- Country Songs - Volume 5 (Viking, 1960)
- Country Songs - Volume 6 (Viking, 1962)
- Sing Folk Songs (Viking, 1965)
- Country Roundup (Viking, 1972)

=== Singles ===
- "Maple on the Hill" / "Will You Be Lonesome Too" (TANZA, 1949)
- "The Bushman's Rodeo" / "Mother Pal and Sweetheart" (TANZA, 1949)
- "When You Have No One to Love You" / "Too Late to Worry, Too Blue to Cry" (TANZA, 1949)
- "The Faded Coat of Blue" / "You Played Love on the Strings of My Heart" (TANZA, 1950)
- "On the Sunny Side of the Mountain" / "Highway Hobo" (TANZA, 1950)
- "The Sunny Mountainside" / "The Rose of Rio" (TANZA, 1950)
- "Jealous Heart" / "Mama Don't Like Music" (TANZA, 1950)
- "The Smoke Went Up the Chimney" / "I'll Not Forget My Mother's Prayers" (TANZA, 1950)
- "Violets Blue" / "On the Plains Away Out There" (TANZA, 1950)
- "I've Wandered Too Long" / "The Outlaw" (TANZA, 1950)
- "Little Pal" / "I'm Sorry It Ended This Way" (TANZA, 1952)
- "Take Me In the Lifeboat" / "My Mother's Prayer" (TANZA, 1952)
- "Little Sweetheart Come and Kiss Me" / "Wedding Bells" (TANZA, 1952)
- "Hawaiian Hotel March" / "My Isle on Hilo Bay" (TANZA, 1952) (as Colin McCrorie's Kalua Islanders)
- "Kehaulani" / "Hula Blues" (TANZA, 1952) (as Colin McCrorie's Kalua Islanders)
- "Maple on the Hill Part 2" / "What Would You Give in Exchange for Your Soul" (TANZA, 1952)
- "The Wonderful City" / "When Mother Prayed for Me" (TANZA, 1956)
- "Dancing in the Stars" / "Hawaii Sing to Me" (TANZA, 1956) (as Nola Hewitt & Myra Hewitt with Colin McCrorie's Kalua Islanders)
- "Waterloo" / "Bye Bye Baby" (Viking, 1958)

=== EPs ===
- "Western Song Hits" (Viking, 1958)
- "Mother Pal and Sweetheart" (Viking, 1962)
- "Songs by Cole Wilson" (Viking, 1963)

=== Compilations ===
- 22 Golden Greats (Music World, 1978; reissued by Lucky Country, 1993)
- The Golden Years of The Tumbleweeds: 1949-1989 (Viking, 2014)
