= Leslie Wilson =

Leslie Wilson may refer to:

- Leslie Wilson (cricketer) (1859–1944), played for Kent
- Sir Leslie Wilson (politician) (1876–1955), British politician, Royal Marines officer, and colonial governor
- Leslie Wilson (cyclist) (1926–2006), British cyclist
- Leslie Blackett Wilson (born 1930), British computer scientist, chair of computing science at the University of Stirling
- Leslie Wilson (author), author of novels and short stories
- Leslie Alan Wilson (born 1941/42), Australian billionaire
- Leslie Wilson-Westcott (born 1979), Canadian curler

== See also ==
- Les Wilson (disambiguation)
