= Hooray for Love (album) =

Studio album by Mavis Rivers
- Released: 1960
- Recorded: 1960
- Genre: Jazz
- Label: Capitol – ST1294
- Producer: Bill Miller

Mavis Rivers chronology
Take a Number (1959)	Hooray for Love (1960)	The Simple Life (1960)

Professional ratings
Review scores
Source	Rating
Allmusic	3/5 stars
DownBeat	4/5 stars

Hooray for Love is a 1960 album by the New Zealand and Polynesian jazz singer Mavis Rivers. It was arranged by Jack Marshall.

== Track listing ==
1. "Hooray for Love" (Harold Arlen, Leo Robin) – 2:42
2. "I Fall in Love Too Easily" (Sammy Cahn, Jule Styne) – 2:22
3. "Do You Love Me" (Harry Ruby) – 2:24
4. "Like Love" (Duke Ellington, Bob Russell) – 2:51
5. "Parlez-moi d'amour (Speak to Me of Love)" (Jean Lenoir) – 1:59
6. "There Is No Breeze (To Cool the Flame of Love)" (Alex Alstone, Dorothy Dick) – 2:42
7. "The Glory of Love" (Billy Hill) – 2:15
8. "You Don't Know What Love Is" (Gene DePaul, Don Raye) – 3:00
9. "Love" (Ralph Blane, Hugh Martin) – 2:30
10. "In Love in Vain" (Jerome Kern, Leo Robin) – 3:18
11. "Love of My Life" (Johnny Mercer, Artie Shaw) – 2:39
12. "Almost Like Being in Love" (Alan Jay Lerner, Frederick Loewe) – 2:49

== Personnel ==
- Mavis Rivers – vocals
- Jack Marshall – arranger
- Bill Miller – producer
