= Bill Ditchfield =

New Zealand cricketer and musician

William Ditchfield
Personal information
- Born: 21 May 1903; Sydney, Australia
- Died: 21 March 1991 (aged 87); Dunedin, New Zealand
- Source: ESPNcricinfo, 8 May 2016

William George Ditchfield (21 May 1903 – 21 March 1991) was a New Zealand musician and cricketer. He played one first-class cricket match for Otago in 1933/34.

Ditchfield was born at Sydney in Australia in 1903. He worked as a window dresser and was a founder member of a "pioneering" New Zealand country and western band The Tumbleweeds in 1949, playing double bass, harmonica and banjo. He had previously played in The Hawaiian Serenaders and was inspired to form The Tumbleweeds after hearing Myra Hewitt sing Maple on the Hill, the song which became the groups best selling single with over 80,000 copies sold. The band were inducted into the New Zealand Country Music Hall of Fame in 1988, and hand impressions in cement were added to Gore's Gold Guitar Awards "Hands of Fame" walk in 1991.

Ditchfield died at Dunedin in 1991 and is buried in Andersons Bay Cemetery. Obituaries were published in the New Zealand Cricket Almanack in 1992 and in Wisden in 1993.
