= Hooray for Love (1935 song) =

Song
- Released: February 16, 1935
- Genre: Ballad, romance
- Songwriter: Jimmy McHugh
- Lyricist: Dorothy Fields

Hooray for Love is a ballad written by Jimmy McHugh with lyrics by Dorothy Fields. It was published in 1935 for the movie of the same name starring Ann Sothern and Gene Raymond, where it is played in the opening credits and sung by the cast in several parts of the film. It was first recorded on April 4, 1935 by Benny Goodman and his orchestra with vocals by Helen Ward. Another version of the song with the same title was released in 1948 written by Harold Arlen with lyrics by Leo Robin, albeit with different lyrics. This version first gained widespread attention when it was sung by Tony Martin in the 1948 film Casbah starring Yvonne DeCarlo. The 1935 version was also recorded by Patricia Rossborough in 1936. The 1948 version of the song has been covered by other famous musicians including Ella Fitzgerald, Mavis Rivers (for her album of the same name released in 1960), Dinah Shore, Johnny Mercer and the Pied Pipers, Bing Crosby with the Skylarks, Alice Faye, Marilyn Maxwell, and Evelyn Knight. The song is about celebrating the joy, optimism, and universal experience of romance and the thrill of falling in love and the celebratory feeling of finding a romantic partner.
