= Maple on the Hill =

Song written by Gussie Davis in 1880

"Maple on the Hill" (also known by its original title of "We Sat Beneath the Maple on the Hill") is a country and western standard (song), written by Gussie Davis in 1880.

The song was Davis's first published song. Davis published it himself, paying a local printer $20, and sold enough copies to make his money back plus a little more. In it, the singer recalls sitting with his love under the maple on the hill. Now, as he is dying, he bids her not to forget him.

The song has been covered by numerous artists, including Vernon Dalhart, The Carter Family, Jean Ritchie, Hank Locklin, and The Tumbleweeds. Many of these later versions were recorded with an amended tune, possibly by Addison Cole, who is cited in some sources as the song's writer.

The song has also spawned several responses, with names such as "New Maple on the Hill", "Answer to Maple on the Hill", and "Maple on the Hill – Part 2".
