= Les Wilson (musician) =

New Zealand singer-songwriter (1924–1997)

- Also known as: The Otago Rambler
- Born: Arthur Leslie Wilson; 2 August 1924; Dunedin, New Zealand
- Died: 22 July 1997 (aged 72) Brisbane, Queensland, Australia
- Genre: Country
- Occupation: Singer-songwriter
- Instruments: Vocals, guitar
- Years active: 1939–
- Labels: Regal Zonophone; His Master's Voice
- Relatives: Cole Wilson (brother)

Arthur Lesle Wilson (2 August 1924 – 22 July 1997) was a New Zealand musician and singer–songwriter who performed as Les Wilson and "The Otago Rambler". He began performing on stage at the age of nine, and from the 1950s was a country-music singer and songwriter, often performing with his wife, Jean Calder (c.1929–2019). He was billed as "Dunedin's own Tex Morton".

== Biography ==
Wilson was born in Dunedin, the son of Robert Moffat Wilson and Louisa Elizabeth Wilson (née Lemon), and the younger brother of musician Cole Wilson.

Wilson began playing harmonica on stage as a nine-year-old, and was soon also playing the banjo, guitar and violin, gravitating towards the country and western genre. By the time that he was 12 years old, Wilson was appearing at various venues in Dunedin. In the following years, Wilson was contracted by impresario Joe Brown to perform weekly at dances at the Dunedin Town Hall, and which were broadcast on radio station 4ZB. As a result, he was soon well-known, particularly in the lower South Island.

At the age of 14, Wilson performed at the annual Dunedin charity ball in August 1939, billed as the "14-year-old yodelling cowboy". Heavy snow in Dunedin meant that the radio broadcast of the performance on 4ZB and 4YA was disrupted as the landline to the transmitter was cut by snow. Wilson was signed to a six-month contract with 4ZB, but the outbreak of World War II the following month led to the cancellation of a planned tour by Wilson of radio stations around the country. When he was old enough, Wilson enlisted for service in the war.

In the early 1950s a station owner suggested that Wilson make some recordings. To achieve an "authentic western echo", they travelled to Nūhaka to record Wilson's singing and yodelling in a reverberant hall. When singing, Wilson performed directly into the microphone, but he would turn and face the wall when yodelling to produce the sought-after echo. The recordings resulted in Wilson being one of the first New Zealand acts signed by HMV, with his first songs on the label released in 1953. Wilson also became a prolific songwriter, with his work—such as "The Wahine Song" and "Rollin' Wagons"—often having New Zealand themes.

Wilson and his wife Jean Calder formed a duo and made extensive tours in New Zealand, generally to full houses. Albums on the HMV label were released in 1957 (A Cowboy and His Guitar) and 1958 (Rambling with Les and Jean). The couple moved to Australia, basing themselves there for the remainder of their career. They initially settled in Sydney, making tours of rural New South Wales and Victoria, making appearances on the syndicated country music radio show Harmony Trails, and frequently returning to perform in New Zealand.

Songs written by Wilson continued to be re-recorded by later artists. "Old Faithful and I", released by Wilson in 1950, was covered by the Topp Twins in 2005 on their album Flowergirls & Cowgirls. "Silver Wings", from 1953, was included on Patsy Riggir's 1982 album, Are You Lonely. There have been at least six covers of Wilson's 1953 song, "Rockonover River", including one in 1984 by Australian country music artist Owen Blundell.

At the Tamworth Country Music Festival in January 1978, Wilson was among the second group of inductees to the Australian Country Music Hands of Fame. In the 2000s a compilation of the duo's recordings from 78s was released, The 78's Re-issue.

== Personal life ==
After World War II, Wilson moved to Gisborne, where he met his future wife Jean Ellen Calder (born c. 1929), who was also a country music singer and occasionally sang on the local radio station 2ZM. In 1952 Wilson and Calder married and they formed a duo, with Calder continuing to perform under her maiden name. They worked in both Australia and New Zealand and recorded on the HMV label during the 1950s. The pair were amongst the earliest to record an LP record in New Zealand, recording two nine-track records in 1957 and 1958. Arthur Leslie Wilson died in Brisbane on 22 July 1997, aged 72, and was cremated at Fawkner Memorial Park on 28 July. Jean Ellen Wilson (née Calder) died in Brisbane on 10 March 2019.

== Discography ==
=== Studio albums ===
- The Otago Rambler (His Master's Voice, 1957)
- Rambling With Les And Jean (His Master's Voice, 1958)
- Death Of The Wahine (1977)
