= Ruru Karaitiana =

New Zealand musician and songwriter (1909–1970)

Rangi Ruru Wananga Karaitiana (4 March 1909 – 15 December 1970) was a New Zealand musician and songwriter.

Karaitiana was born in Dannevirke, New Zealand, on 4 March 1909. He was Māori, and was a member of the Ngāti Kahungunu and Rangitāne tribes. He served with Māori Battalion during World War II, and led the battalion's concert party.

After the war Karaitiana assembled a quintet, and in October 1948 recorded a version of his song "Blue Smoke" with singer Pixie Williams to a Hawaiian-style backing played by Jimmy Carter's Hawaiians – the first record wholly produced in New Zealand from composition to pressing, and provided the début for the TANZA record label. It topped the New Zealand radio hit parades for six weeks, and it went on to be recorded by a number of overseas artists, including Dean Martin in 1951.

On 2 October 2019, Karaitiana, along with Pixie Williams and Jim Carter, was inducted into the New Zealand Music Hall of Fame, to mark the 70th anniversary of the release of "Blue Smoke".

== Awards ==
=== Aotearoa Music Awards ===
The Aotearoa Music Awards (previously known as New Zealand Music Awards (NZMA)) are an annual awards night celebrating excellence in New Zealand music and have been presented annually since 1965.

Year	Nominee / work	Award	Result	Ref.
2019	Ruru Karaitiana	New Zealand Music Hall of Fame	inductee	
