= TANZA =

- Parent company: Radio Corporation of New Zealand (until 1958), then PYE Industries
- Founded: 1949
- Founder: Radio Corporation of New Zealand (RCNZ)
- Defunct: 1956
- Status: Defunct
- Distributors: RCNZ (initially), later His Master's Voice NZ
- Genre: Various
- Country of origin: New Zealand
- Location: Wellington

TANZA was a pioneering New Zealand record label, from 1949 to 1956. TANZA stands for To Assist New Zealand Artists, and was the first company to record and produce records in New Zealand. The majority were 78 rpm records, with some 45 rpm records and LPs produced from 1952.

== History ==
The label was started by the Radio Corporation of New Zealand Limited (RCNZ), which manufactured Columbus and Courtenay radios and radiograms, sold through their Columbus Radio Centre 30 retail outlets. The Managing Director and founder of RCNZ, Mr W. Marks (born William Markov), was single minded in concentrating the development of the company on the design and manufacture of radios and apart from some wartime production this was the case until his death in late 1946.

Following his death his eldest son Alex became Managing Director and the Directors and executives realised that the company needed to expand and recording was chosen as a new venture.

Fred Green, RZNZ Production Manager, approached Stan Dallas, then at radio station 2ZB, to set up a recording studio to record advertisements for the advertising industry which was to be the main business of TANZA. Originally on acetate discs but later pressed in Vinyl. Bart Fortune, the RCNZ Sales & Marketing manager devised the name TANZA.

The recording studio was established at 262 Wakefield Street, Wellington. The building had been a Brass Foundry and was handy to the RCNZ Head Office & Factory at 80 Courtenay Place. After clearing the space of some 50 years of foundry operations the ground floor initially contained one large and two small recording studios and a central control room at the rear of the building. Later the first floor at the front of the building was to become the pressing plant with three record presses and associated equipment. Auckland recordings were made at Astor studio in Shortland Street, by engineer Noel Peach.

For about two years the His Master's Voice (NZ) Ltd. had been supplying the New Plymouth and Dannevirke Columbus shops with records for retail sale and although RCNZ was hopeful that further shops might be included this was not to be the case and in mid 1948 the supply agreement was cancelled. It was this action that prompted RCNZ to set up their pressing plant as quickly as possible and by the end of 1948 they were able to press records from stampers supplied by Australian Record Company (ARC) and by early 1949 they were able to process their own originals and the first was "Blue Smoke".

The parent company RCNZ was bought by PYE Industries of Auckland about 1958. The Wellington studio was purchased by His Master's Voice NZ (later EMI NZ) in 1962.

== Recordings ==
"Blue Smoke" TANZA Green Label 1, was recorded by Pixie Williams and the Ruru Karaitiana Quintette. The song though labeled as recorded 3 October 1948, was actually recorded February 1949 and released about March/April 1949; it sold over 50,000 copies. The second TANZA record was Paekakariki: The land of the Tiki by Ken Avery. Other artists recorded included The Tumbleweeds, the Star Dusters, Pat McMinn, Esme Stephens, Crombie Murdoch and jazz vocalist Mavis Rivers. About 300 78s were pressed (excluding private recordings), plus 31 45s (26 & 5 EP) and 4 LPs (3 10” & 1 12”). The original concept of recording advertisements and distributing them to radio stations on vinyl discs proved to be a major success and some 4250 single side discs were produced in the seven years that TANZA studios were operating, an average of 12 per week.

Stan Dallas became the studio manager and engineer and was assisted by John Shears initially. Others involved were Tony Hall (record pressing manager), John Shears (copyrights and marketing), Jack Christie (copyrights), Terry Petersen (assistant to Stan Dallas), Tony Small (studio assistant), and Graeme Thompson (process).
