= Gussie Davis =

American songwriter

Gussie Lord Davis

Background information
- Born: December 3, 1863; Dayton, Ohio
- Died: October 18, 1899 (aged 35)
- Occupation: Songwriter
- Years active: 1880-1899

Gussie Lord Davis (December 3, 1863 – October 18, 1899) was an American songwriter born in Dayton, Ohio. Davis was one of America's earliest successful African-American music artists, the first black songwriter to become famous on Tin Pan Alley as a composer of popular music.

== Early life ==
Gussie Davis received musical training at the Nelson Musical College in Cincinnati, Ohio, where his application was rejected due to the color of his skin. Instead, he worked as a janitor at a low wage in exchange for private lessons. His first song was published in 1880, "We Sat Beneath the Maple on the Hill"; Davis published it himself, paying a local printer $20, and sold enough copies to make his money back plus a little more. He continued his songwriting efforts with increasing success, publishing many songs and attracting attention, including that of Cincinnati publisher and would-be lyricist, George Propheter. (Note: According to one source, Propheter's publishing business was founded on Davis's talent.)

== Career ==
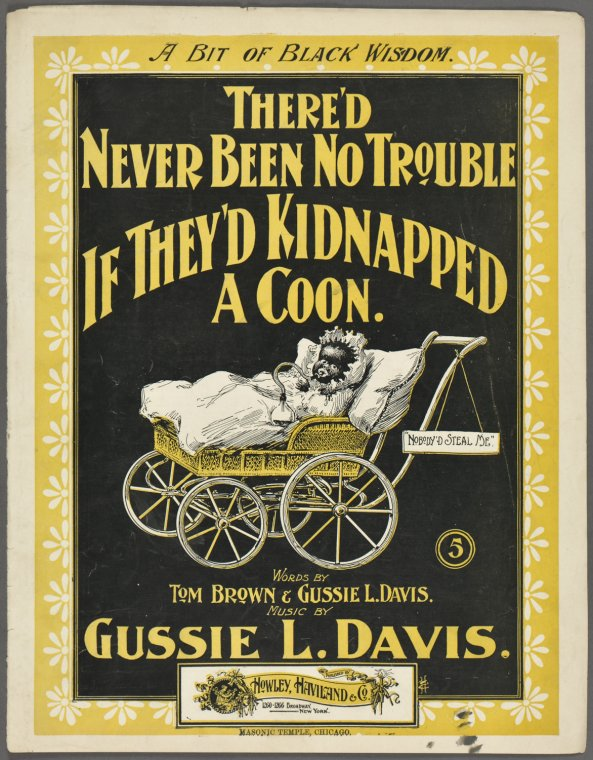
Cover of sheet music for one of Davis's songs

In 1886, when Propheter branched out his business to New York and Tin Pan Alley, Davis went with him. He worked steadily, performing as well as writing songs, and making a name for himself. (Note: His profile was low enough, however, that some who saw only his name mistook him for a woman.) By 1895, he was sufficiently well known to be selected to compete in a contest sponsored by the New York World to find the ten best songwriters in the nation; he placed second with his song, "Send Back the Picture and the Ring", and won a prize of $500 in gold. He performed as a pianist in venues such as Bergen Star Concerts and toured with minstrel groups including his own Davis Operatic and Plantation Minstrels.

Davis wrote a variety of musical forms, including sentimental ballads, comic minstrel songs, art songs, and choral music. He was best known in his own time for his "tear-jerkers". One of these was "Fatal Wedding" (1893), his first national hit; Davis composed the music, a waltz, while the words are credited to William H. Windom, a well-known ballad singer. Another tear-jerker was "In the Baggage Coach Ahead", Davis's most commercially successful composition, selling over a million copies. (Note: It is not clear how much Davis profited directly from this composition; some sources say he sold it for a bargain, others that he was fairly compensated.) The success of "In the Baggage Coach" was fueled by the popular female vaudeville singer, Imogene Comer, who made it part of her regular repertoire.

== Death ==
An April 1899 article in The Freeman reported that Davis had purchased a home in Whitestone, New York and that he was recovering from a serious illness. In August of that year, press releases indicated he would appear in A Hot Old Time in Dixie, going on the road in the coming season; this musical farce was Davis's property with Tom McIntosh. On October 18, 1899, Davis died at home in Whitestone.

At the time of his death, Gussie Davis had published more than three hundred songs and certainly left more in manuscript.

== Selected songs ==
- "We Sat Beneath The Maple on the Hill" (1880)
- "When Nelly Was Raking the Hay" (1884)
- "Light House by the Sea" (1886)
- "Little Footsteps in the Snow" (1886) (Note: Not the Bluegrass classic, but a different song.)
- "Wait Till the Tide Comes In" (1887), words by George Propheter
- "Why Does Papa Stay So Late?" (1889)
- "Fatal Wedding" (1893), words by William H. Windom
- "Only a Bowery Boy" (1894), words by Charles B. Ward
- "Down in Poverty Row" (1895), music by Arthur Trevelyan
- "In the Baggage Coach Ahead" (1896)
- "She Waited at the Altar in Vain" (1897)
- "Only a Nigger Baby" (1897)
- "My Creole Sue" (1898)
- "He Is Coming to Us Dead" (Note: Also known as "The Express Office".) (1899)

Also notable is Davis's "Irene, Good Night" (1886), which entered the folk song repertoire, albeit significantly altered, as "Goodnight, Irene" in Negro Folk Songs as Sung by Lead Belly (1936).
