= Pixie Williams =

New Zealand singer

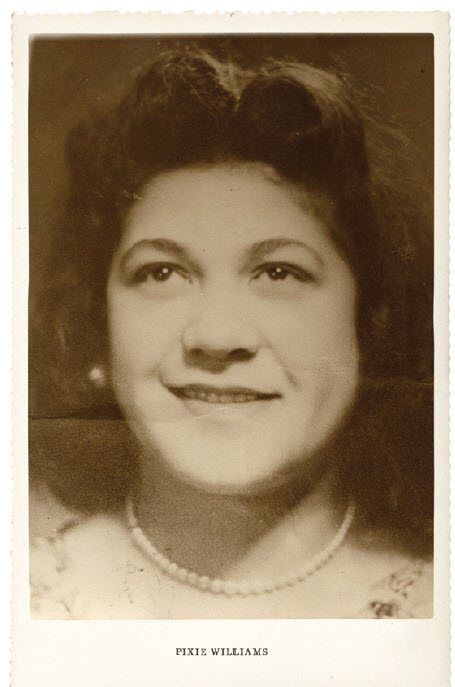

Background information
- Born: Pikiteora Maude Emily Gertrude Edith Williams; 12 July 1928; Mohaka, New Zealand
- Died: 2 August 2013 (aged 85) Upper Hutt, New Zealand
- Relatives: Ian Taylor (nephew)

Pikiteora Maude Emily Gertrude Edith "Pixie" Williams (married name Costello; 12 July 1928 – 2 August 2013) was a New Zealand singer best known for the song "Blue Smoke", recorded in 1949. In 2019, she was inducted into the New Zealand Music Hall of Fame.

== Early life and family ==
Williams was born in 1928 at Mohaka in the Hawke's Bay region. Of Māori descent, she was affiliated to the Ngāti Kahungunu iwi. She was raised by her grandparents until she was 12 years old, when her grandmother died. She then lived with her uncle, and then, from the age of 14, her mother. When she was 17, Williams moved to Wellington, finding work in a factory and living at the YWCA hostel on Oriental Parade.

== "Blue Smoke" ==
"Blue Smoke" was the first single to be locally recorded and manufactured in New Zealand, backed by the song "Señorita", and was also the first release on the local TANZA label. The A-side was written by Ruru Karaitiana whilst he was on board a troop ship during World War II, and was recorded in September and October 1948 for release in February the following year by the Ruru Karaitiana Quintette (sic) with Williams on vocals. It was number one on the New Zealand charts for six weeks and sold around 50,000 copies.

A self-taught singer, Williams was recommended to Karaitiana by his fiancée Joan, who had sung with her whilst staying at YWCA hostel in Wellington. She was to go on to sing on several more recordings during 1949 and 1950: "Bellbird Serenade" (backed by Jimmy Carter's Hawaiians), "Maori Rhythm" (backed by Alan Shand's Orchestra), and "Saddle Hill", as part of Ruru Karaitiana's Quavertones. The Quavertones were credited with "Let's Talk it Over" and "Windy City".

== Later life ==
In 1951, Williams went to Dunedin, where she met and married Irish-born John Edward "Paddy" Costello. The couple went on to have four children. Paddy Costello died in 2006, and Williams returned to live in Wellington.

In 2011, the Recording Industry Association of New Zealand recognised Williams with a triple platinum award for "Blue Smoke" and single platinum award for the song "Let's Talk it Over". The same year, a digitally remastered compilation of Williams' songs, For the Record: The Pixie Williams Collection, was released.

Williams died at a rest home and hospital in Upper Hutt on 2 August 2013. She had been suffering from dementia, diabetes and Parkinson's disease. After a funeral in Upper Hutt, Williams was buried with her husband at Green Park Cemetery in Waldronville, Dunedin.

== Awards ==
On 2 October 2019, Williams, along with Ruru Karaitiana and Jim Carter, was inducted into the New Zealand Music Hall of Fame, to mark the 70th anniversary of the release of "Blue Smoke".

=== Aotearoa Music Awards ===
The Aotearoa Music Awards (previously known as New Zealand Music Awards (NZMA)) are an annual awards night celebrating excellence in New Zealand music and have been presented annually since 1965.

Year	Nominee / work	Award	Result	Ref.
2019	Pixie Williams	New Zealand Music Hall of Fame	inductee	
