= Mavis Rivers =

Samoan and New Zealand jazz singer

- Born: Mavis Chloe Rivers; 19 May 1929; Apia, Samoa
- Died: 29 May 1992 (aged 63) Los Angeles, California, U.S.
- Genre: Jazz
- Occupation: Singer
- Instrument: Vocals
- Labels: TANZA; Stebbings; Zodiac Records; Reprise Records; Capitol Records
- Spouse: Glicerio Reyes "David”" Catingub (m. 1955)

Mavis Chloe Rivers (19 May 1929 – 29 May 1992) was a Samoan and New Zealand jazz singer who had success in the United States, being signed to Reprise Records by Frank Sinatra.

== Life ==
Mavis Rivers was born in Apia, Samoa, on 19 May 1929, the daughter of Moody Charles Rivers and Louisa Stehlin. She had 12 siblings and came from a musical family. During the Second World War, the family moved to Pago Pago, American Samoa, and then to Auckland, New Zealand in 1947. There, Mavis and three of her sisters (Natalie, Mitzi, and Sally) made several recordings having been noticed by executives at TANZA Records (going by the name "Rivers Sisters"). Her work initially started with Polynesian-based songs but she transitioned to performing jazz standards. Mavis also worked as a stenographer and appeared numerous times at the Peter Pan Cabaret on Queen Street. Rivers also made several recordings with the Lloyd Sly Quartette at Stebbing Studios, released on Zodiac, Capitol and Stebbings labels. In 1955, Rivers moved to the United States where she married Glicerio Reyes "David" Catingub, a Filipino singer and bass player, on October 4, 1955, with the marriage producing two sons, Matt and Reynaldo Catingub. Rivers was nominated for a Grammy Award for Best New Artist in 1960. Frank Sinatra signed her up to his newly formed Reprise Records label.

Rivers died in 1992 after suffering a stroke during a concert in Los Angeles, California.

== Discography ==
- Take a Number (Capitol, 1959)
- The Simple Life (Capitol, 1960)
- Hooray for Love (Capitol, 1960)
- Swing Along with Mavis (Reprise, 1961)
- Mavis (Reprise, 1961)
- Do It Now (Reprise, 1962)
- Mavis Meets Shorty with Shorty Rogers (Reprise, 1963)
- We Remember Mildred Bailey with Red Norvo (Vee Jay, 1965)
- It's a Good Day (Delos, 1984)

=== As guest ===
With Matt Catingub

- My Mommy and Me (Sea Breeze, 1983)
- Your Friendly Neighborhood Big Band (Reference, 1984)
- High Tech Big Band (Sea Breeze, 1985)
- I'm Getting Cement All Over You (Ewe) (Sea Breeze, 1991)

With others

- Alfred Newman, Ken Darby, Ports of Paradise (Capitol, 1960)
- Red Norvo, The Red Norvo Quintet (Studio West, 1990)
