= Window capping =

In construction, capping or window capping (window cladding, window wrapping) refers to the application of aluminum or vinyl sheeting cut and formed with a brake to fit over the exterior, wood trim of a building. The aluminum is intended to make aging trim with peeling paint look better, reduce future paint maintenance, and provide a weather-proof layer to control the infiltration of water.

== Overview ==
The capping application must direct water away from the original under-lying wood material and prevent infiltration of water into the structure. Cladding applied to exterior window and door casing (brick-moulding) and their associated parts is often referred to as window capping or window cladding. This sort of capping is typically applied in order to eliminate the need to re-paint wood window trim. The aluminum capping helps to prevent wood rot by protecting the wood from water and snow. However, capping will exacerbate wood rot if the moisture in the wood is coming from inside the building or the capping leaks. Good installation of capping allows for an outlet for water in the event of a leak. Caulking and sealant materials may be used to help prevent leaks but these products are not considered reliable in the long-term.

A sill that has been clad should provide a "drip cap" or "drip-control" function. This will serve to direct water away from the wall surface directly underneath the sill. The leading edge of the sill must be the lowest point on the sill to ensure that water does not wick into the sill material.

Window capping may provide a marginal increase in energy efficiency by decreasing the potential for drafts by providing an extra barrier between the exterior and the interior.

The most common material used in residential window capping is factory painted aluminum. An alternative to factory painted aluminum is to use a vinyl coated aluminium material.

Aluminum capping can be painted so long as the painter is highly skilled and knowledgeable in the field of metal painting.

== Criticisms ==
Capping can hide problems rather than fix them. Aluminum and vinyl are impermeable materials so the natural transfer of moisture through the wood trim will be trapped when it reaches the capping material. The quality of paint on some aluminum coil stock begins to chalk or fade in about five years so the claim of being maintenance free can be misleading.
