= Capping week =

New Zealand term for the week of university graduation

Capping Week is a term used in New Zealand for the week of graduation from university. This is when graduands of the university are presented with their degrees and capped. Capping week may coincide with a period of practical jokes or capping stunts.
