= Kenneth Avery =

New Zealand jazz musician, radio programme manager, and songwriter

Kenneth Stopford Avery (24 June 1922 – 12 June 1983) was a New Zealand jazz musician, radio programme manager and songwriter. He was born on 24 June 1922.
