= Howard Morrison Quartet =

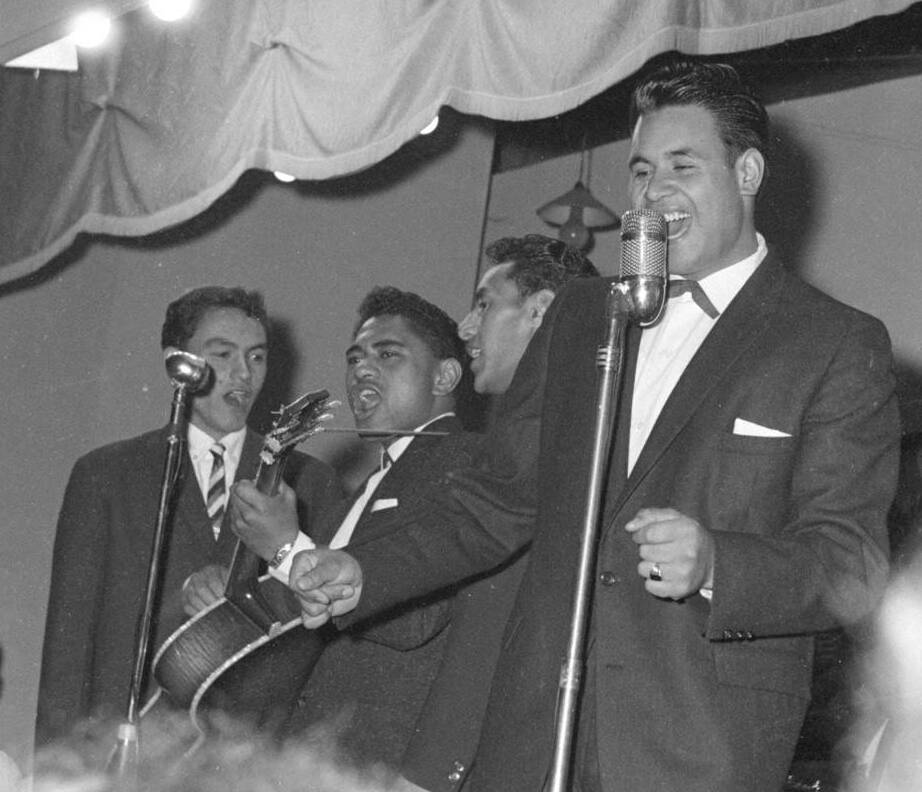
- The Howard Morrison Quartet in 1959

Background information
- Origin: Rotorua, New Zealand
- Genres: Easy listening, Tangatawhenua
- Years active: 1956–1965, 1975, 1979, 1989, 1992-199?, 2006, 2008, 2009

The Howard Morrison Quartet (originally named the Ohinemutu Quartet) was a New Zealand band during the 1950s and early 1960s. The band was formed by Sir Howard Morrison and included Gerry Merito, Wi Wharekura and Noel Kingi.

In 1955, while working as a surveyor's chainman, Morrison started putting together vocal groups to entertain at rugby club socials in Rotorua. The next year, the original Quartet members and their extended whānau won the 1956 Rotorua Soundshell Talent Quest, following which Morrison toured Australia as a member of the Aotearoa Concert Party. This lead him to decide to pursue music as a career.

On his return, Morrison heard guitarist Gerry Merito and put together a group with Gerry and two others, Wi Wharekura and Noel Kingi, and named the group Howard Morrison Quartet. In 1958, they became part of Benny Levin's touring 'Pop Jamboree.' A recording they made of "Hoki Mai/ Po Karekare Ana" sold well, and in 1959 their parody of "The Battle of New Orleans," recorded as "The Battle of the Waikato", became one of their biggest hits.

In 1960, they were so popular their managers released 13 singles, three EPs and two albums. Another parody of Lonnie Donegan's, "My Old Man's A Dustman" was rewritten by Gerry Merito as "My Old Man's An All Black." This was topical because of the controversy over Maoris not being allowed to tour South Africa with that year's All Blacks.

In 1962, two of their singles were more parodies, with Ray Stevens' "Ahab The Arab" becoming "Mori The Hori" and Pat Boone's "Speedy Gonzales" becoming "George The Wilder Colonial Boy", celebrating the exploits of escaped convict George Wilder.

Due to the constant touring and absence from families, the quartet disbanded in 1965, but occasionally re-united in various incarnations over subsequent years.

== Incarnations ==
1956-1957 (The Ohinemutu "Quartet")

- Sir Howard Morrison
- John Morrison
- Terry Morrison
- Wi Wharekura
- Chubby Hamiora
- Gary Rangiihu

1957-1958

- Sir Howard Morrison
- Gerry Merito
- Laurie Morrison
- John Morrison

1958-1959

- Sir Howard Morrison
- Gerry Merito
- Laurie Morrison
- Tai Eru

1959-1960

- Sir Howard Morrison
- Gerry Merito
- Wi Wharekura
- Eddie Howell

1960-1965, 1975 (Return of a Legend), 1989 (This Is Your Life: Sir Howard Morrison) (classic line-up)

- Sir Howard Morrison
- Gerry Merito
- Wi Wharekura
- Noel Kingi

1979 (Tu Tangata '79)

- Sir Howard Morrison
- Gerry Merito
- Toni Williams
- Noel Kingi

1992-199?

- Sir Howard Morrison
- Gerry Merito
- Toni Williams
- Hori Bennett

1995 (Sir Howard Morrison: Time of My Life)

- Sir Howard Morrison
- Gerry Merito
- Terry Morrison
- Tai Eru

Note: this incarnation played part of the Quartet segment of the show before Terry Morrison and Tai Eru gave way to Toni Williams and Hori Bennett, thus reverting to the previous incarnation. After this incarnation played some songs Terry and Tai rejoined them on stage for the finale of the segment.

2006 (A Knight with a Dame)

- Sir Howard Morrison
- Gerry Merito
- Howard Morrison Jr.
- Temuera Morrison

2008 (To Sir With Love)

- Sir Howard Morrison
- Gerry Merito
- Wi Wharekura
- Toni Williams

2009 (Good Morning)

- Sir Howard Morrison
- Toni Williams
- Hori Bennett
- Howard Morrison Jr.
