= Howard Morrison =

New Zealand entertainer (1935–2009)

Sir Howard Morrison OBE
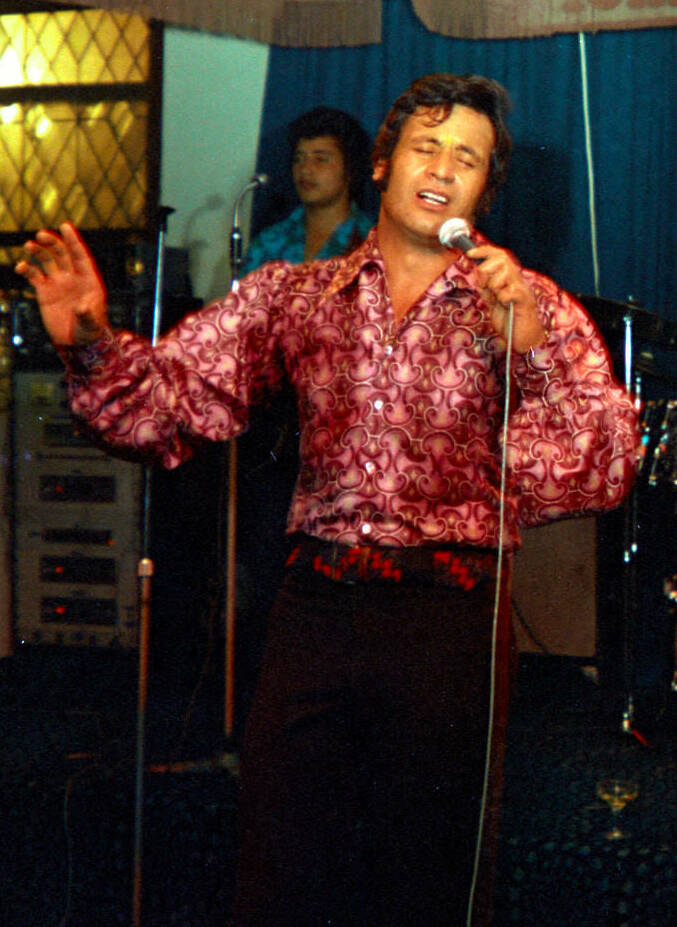
- Morrison performing in 1971
- Born: Howard Leslie Morrison; 18 August 1935; Rotorua, New Zealand
- Died: 24 September 2009 (aged 74); Rotorua, New Zealand
- Education: Te Aute College
- Occupation: Entertainer
- Spouse: Rangiwhata Ann Kuia Manahi (m. 1957)
- Children: 3
- Relatives: Atareta Maxwell (sister); Temuera Morrison (nephew); Michael Ashton (nephew); Taini Morrison (niece)

Sir Howard Leslie Morrison OBE (18 August 1935 – 24 September 2009) was a New Zealand entertainer. From 1964 until his death in 2009, he was one of New Zealand's most beloved television and concert performers, and brought Māori culture to the mainstream of New Zealand society. Morrison was also known for his active support for Māori youth.

== Early life ==
Of Māori (Te Arawa), Irish, and Scottish descent, Morrison was born to Temuera Leslie Morrison, a Māori All Black who worked for the Māori Affairs Department, and Kahurangi Morrison (née Gertrude Harete Davidson) who was known for her work in culture and entertainment.

Morrison grew up in Rotorua and in Ruatahuna near Waikaremoana. He attended a "native school" in the Urewera before going to Te Aute College and Rotorua Boys' High School. After leaving school he had a variety of manual jobs including survey chainman, electricity meter reader and storeman at the Whakatu freezing works.

== Family ==
Morrison and his three surviving sisters, Judy Tapsell, Rene Mitchell and Linda Morrison, lost their oldest brother Laurie in 1974. Another brother, Charlie, died in infancy and youngest sister Atareta Maxwell died suddenly in January 2007 from a heart attack. Their mother Kahurangi died in 1995, as had their father Temuera when they were young.

== Career ==
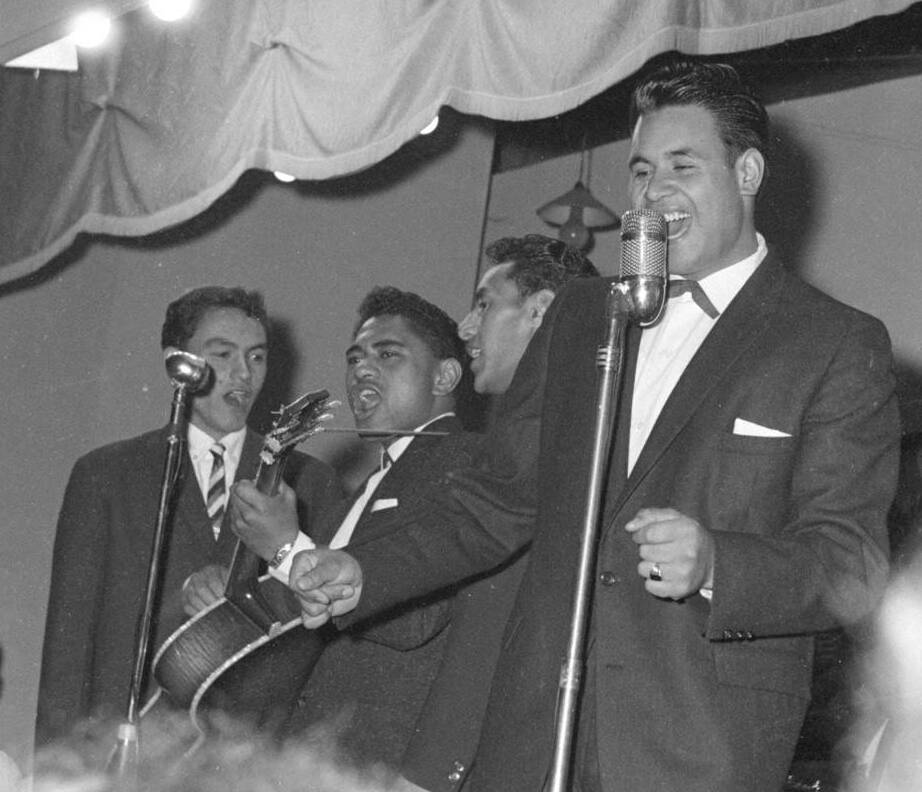
Morrison performing with the Howard Morrison Quartet in 1959

=== Howard Morrison Quartet ===
In 1955, Morrison assembled vocal groups to entertain at Rotorua rugby club socials, and the following year, won the 1956 Rotorua Soundshell Talent Quest with the original Howard Morrison Quartet members and their extended whānau, leading him to decide to pursue music as a career. In the same year, Morrison was a member of the successful Aotearoa Concert Party that toured Australia. In this group was Gerry Merito who with Morrison formed the Ohinemutu Quartet which was later renamed "Howard Morrison Quartet". Other original members of the quartet were Morrison's brother Laurie and his cousin John, but they left and were replaced by Wi Wharekura and Noel Kingi who were fixtures in the quartet at its heights.

In 1960, Merito penned a parody of the Lonnie Donegan hit song "My Old Man's A Dustman" as "My Old Man's an All Black" for the Quartet to mock an apartheid South African decree banning Māori players from the touring All Blacks. The song was a hit, selling an estimated 60,000 copies. Merito's parody showcased a growing anti-apartheid sentiment in South Africa, and in New Zealand that had resulted in a 'No Maoris – No Tour' protest the preceding year. More than 150,000 New Zealanders signed a petition opposing the tour – making it one of the largest petitions in New Zealand history, while others marched in the streets to voice their opposition. Despite these protests, the tour went ahead, controversially backed by the Prime Minister, Sir Walter Nash. The racially selected All Blacks were subsequently defeated by the Springboks. In 1976, Māori players were finally permitted to join the South African tour, but only as 'honorary whites', eventually winning the Test Match 14/9 at Free State Stadium, Bloemfontein. "My Old Man's an All Black" was revived by Morrison in a 1990 television special co-starring Billy T James, accompanied by the Auckland Philharmonia Orchestra.

=== Live performance ===
After the Howard Morrison Quartet disbanded in 1965, Morrison pursued an increasingly successful solo career. Following his Royal Command Performance for Queen Elizabeth II in 1981, the hymn "How Great Thou Art" (Whakaaria Mai) became his de facto theme song for the latter part of his career, after a recording of it by Morrison became one of the country's biggest selling singles, spending five weeks at No 1 on the New Zealand charts. From 1970 to 1983, Morrison hired as his musical director, Wayne Senior whose orchestral arrangement of "How Great Thou Art" featured in the 'Howard Morrison Special' concert he conducted at Founders Theatre in 1982. In the same year, Morrison toured New Zealand with his 5-piece Rotorua Māori showband led by bassist Bundy Waitai, that included Pākehā keyboards player Derek Williams, jocularly dubbed 'Albino Māori' by Morrison. From 1982 to 1985 Morrison was a board member of the Broadcasting Corporation of New Zealand, and in 1990, he opened the Commonwealth Games in Auckland with the song ‘Tukua ahau’. In September of that year, Morrison rode throughout the country on horseback, raising $1.2 million (=c.$2,764,458 equivalent in 2026) for the Life Education Trust.

=== Film and television roles ===
Throughout his career, Morrison appeared in numerous television and film roles. In 1965, he acted as a shearer in the Australian film Funny Things Happen Down Under (1965), and in 1966 he appeared with Eddie Low, Dame Kiri Te Kanawa and Herma and Eliza Keil in the John O'Shea film Don't Let It Get You, a comedy set in Rotorua that was New Zealand's first feature-length musical, composed by Patrick Flynn. In 1971, Morrison played the character 'Mercer' in Hawaii Five-O. From 1977 to 1989 he was spokesman, often with Ray Woolf for Bic products such as lighters and pens, appearing in many television commercials for the brand. In 1996, along with singers Rima Te Wiata, Dame Malvina Major and Eddie Rayner, Morrison was a judge for the Showcase - 1996 Grand Final presented by broadcaster Ian Fraser. In 2008, a year before his death, Morrison was honoured with a full-length television tribute To Sir With Love hosted by actor Pio Terei, and featuring singer John Rowles.

== Tu Tangata ==
Morrison was a consultant on youth development for Te Puni Kōkiri (Department Of Maori Affairs) and used his profile to improve self esteem, promote achievement and encourage participation in higher levels of learning by young Māori, visiting many schools in the process. He developed wānanga (education programmes) on marae and used his entertainment skills to promote the Tu Tangata, or ‘Stand Tall’ programme. Morrison's nationwide Tu Tangata tour in 1979 brought the Quartet together again, with Toni Williams replacing Wi Wharekura, and the Morrison family, including Howard's mother, Kahu, joining the tour.

== Honours and achievements ==
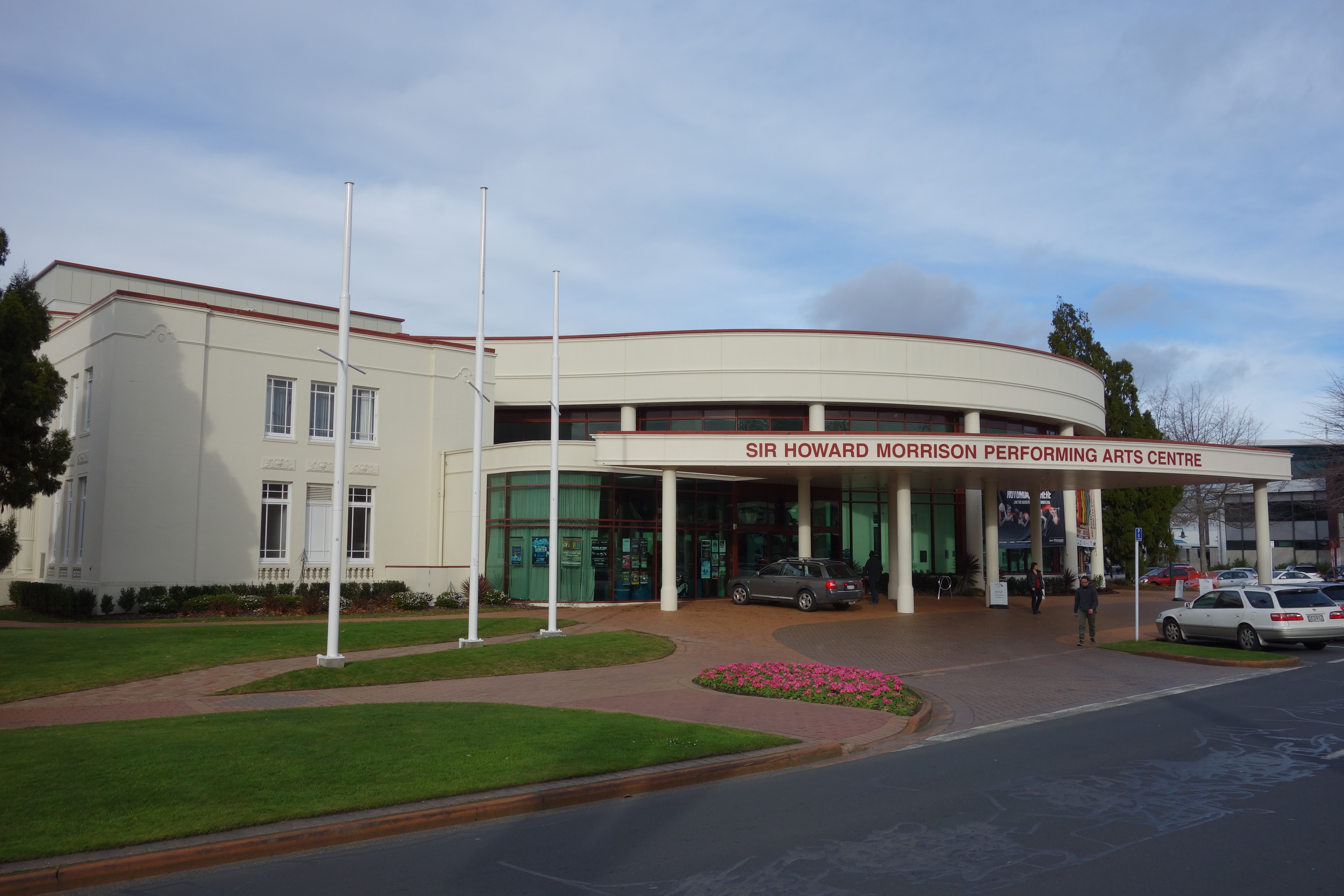
The Civic Theatre in Rotorua was renamed the Sir Howard Morrison Performing Arts Centre

In 1970, Morrison received the Benny Award from the Variety Artists Club of New Zealand Inc. His profile in the Pacific Rim area was used by the New Zealand Trade Commission to help promote the region. As a result, in the 1976 New Year Honours, Morrison was appointed an officer of the Order of the British Empire, for services to entertainment, and he was made a Knight Bachelor in the 1990 Queen's Birthday Honours, also for services to entertainment.

In March 2006, Morrison was awarded an honorary doctorate by the University of Waikato, joining such alumni as Janet Frame, Dame Malvina Major, Hare Puke, Tui Adams, Dame Kiri Te Kanawa, Neil and Tim Finn, Michael King, Margaret Mahy and Rotorua historian Donald Stafford in receiving the award.

At the 2007 Creative New Zealand Te Waka Toi awards Morrison received the Te Tohu Tiketike a Te Waka Toi Award for Maori Artists.

On 14 October 2009, Morrison was selected by Te Aute College to be a part of its 1st XV leaders group at a function at Te Papa in Wellington. The honour is given to former pupils over the age of 55 who have made a significant contribution to Māori society. Morrison attended Te Aute College from 1949 to 1952.

=== Other awards ===
- 1966 Entertainer of the Year
- 1982 Variety Artists Club of New Zealand, Golden Microphone
- 1983 Feltex Awards (New Zealand) Best Television Entertainer
- 1986 Nominated for Best Performer in an Entertainment Programme: for Now is the Hour - HMV Entertainer of the Year
- 1994 New Zealand Film and Television Award for the Best Entertainment Programme for Howard Morrison: Now Is The Hour

== Death ==
On 24 September 2009, Morrison died in his sleep from a heart attack and was found by one of his grandchildren on taking him his morning cup of tea. He died in Ohinemutu and lay in state in Tamatekapua, the premier meeting house of Te Arawa at Te Papaiouru Marae in Rotorua. He was survived by his wife Rangiwhata Ann Manahi (born 1937, married 1957) known as Lady Kuia, two sons and a daughter Donna Mariana Grant, Richard Te Tau Morrison and Howard Morrison Jr. He was also uncle to movie actor Temuera Morrison and kapa haka performer Taini Morrison.

Attendees at his tangihanga (funeral) included Rotorua mayor Kevin Winter, Chinese ambassador Zhang Limin, Sir Michael Fay, MPs Tariana Turia, Georgina te Heuheu, Hekia Parata, Steve Chadwick and Rotorua MP Todd McClay, New Zealand First leader Winston Peters, Te Puni Kokiri chief executive Leith Comer and Māori king Tūheitia Paki.

Morrison was buried at Kauae Cemetery in Ngongotahā, Rotorua. His grave lies alongside those of his parents and other close whānau.

== Discography ==
=== The Howard Morrison Quartet ===
==== Singles ====
Released on Zodiac Records

- "Po Kare Kare Ana" (1959)
- "Hawaiian Cowboy Song" (1960)

Released on La Gloria Records

- "Where Have All the Flowers Gone?" (1961)
- "George, the Wilder N.Z. Boy" (1964)

Released on unknown label

- "Whakaaria Mai (How Great Thou Art)" (1981)

==== Albums and EPs ====
Released on Zodiac Records

- 4 – The Fabulous Howard Morrison Quartet EP (1960)
- "The Battle of the Waikato" (1960)

Released on La Gloria Records

- Four Popular Maori Songs Volume One (1960)
- Pot-Pourri (1960)
- On Stage – Off Stage (1960)
- These Were Their Finest (1960)
- Maori Songs (1962)
- Alive! Need We Say More? (1962)
- Hits of the Road (1962)
- Mind If We Sing? (1962)
- Laugh Along EP (1964)
- Take Ten (1967)
- Born Free (1968)
- Power Game (1969)
- Return of a Legend: Joe Brown (1975)
- Morrison Magic (1979)

=== Solo ===
==== Studio albums ====
Year	Title	NZ peak
1982	Spectacular	6
1990	Live in Concert	13
1992	Music of the Night	42
1994	Christmas Collection	13
1995	This Is My Life	22
2002	Ol' Brown Eyes: Golden Songs of Sir Howard & The Fabulous Howard Morrison Quartet	11
2011	The Definitive Collection	5
2015	How Great Thou Art: The Very Best Of	4

==== Other albums ====
- Howard Morrison (1982)
- Songs of New Zealand (1985)
- Give Your Love – On Stage Off Stage (1998)
- This Is My Life (2009)

=== Video ===
- Once in a Lifetime: He kotuku rerenga tahi (DVD, 2009)
