= Michael Ashton =

New Zealand makeup artist

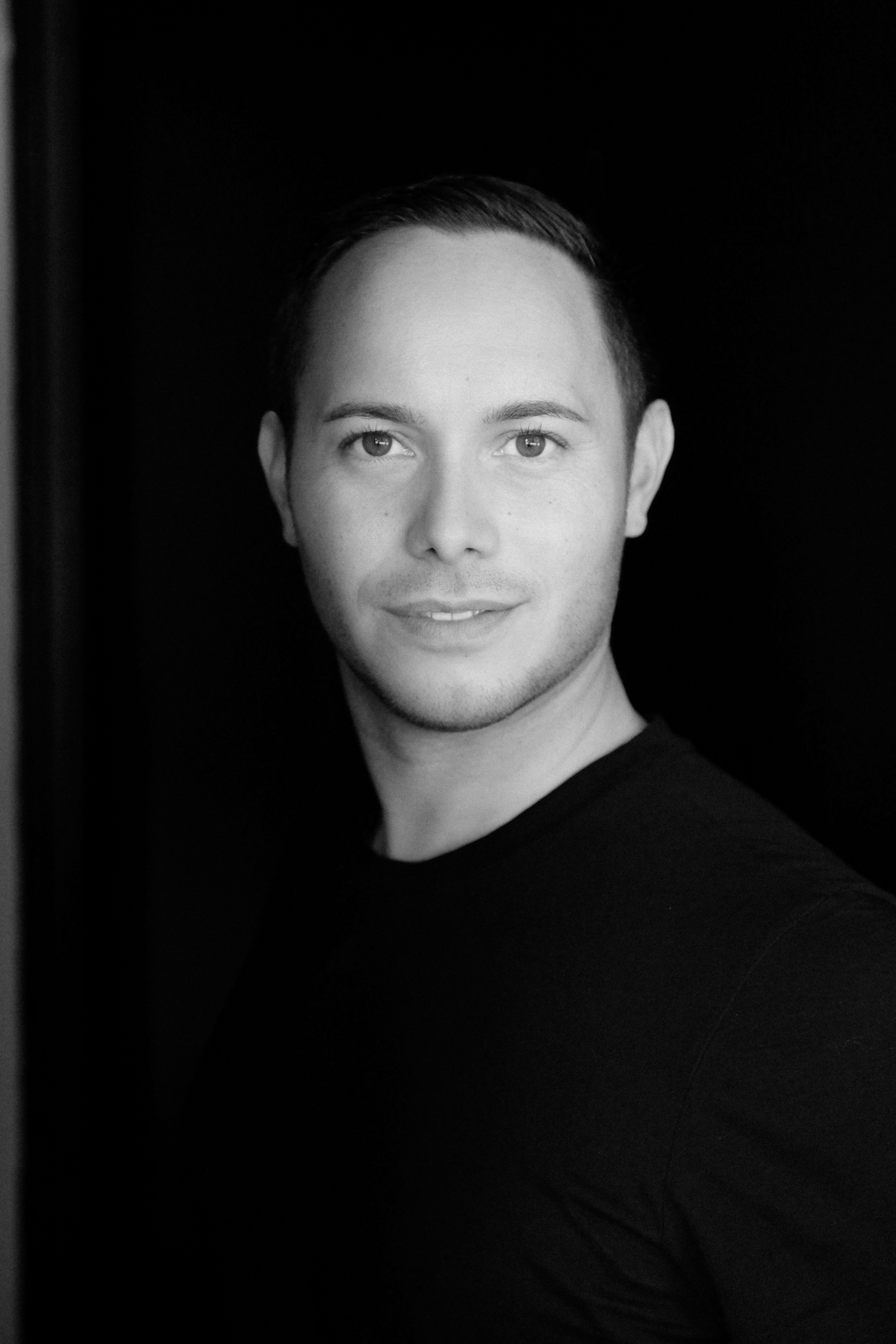
- Born: Michael Owen Ashton; 23 March 1982 (age 44); Hamilton, New Zealand
- Occupation: Celebrity Makeup Artist
- Years active: 2006-present
- Known for: Adele's former makeup artist
- Family: Howard Morrison (uncle); Temuera Morrison (cousin); Taini Morrison (cousin)

Michael Owen Ashton (born 23 March 1982) is a New Zealand makeup artist, hairstylist, beauty expert, and brand founder. He is most notable for being the former makeup artist of recording artist Adele and for his former affiliation with the cosmetic house of Marc Jacobs Beauty, owned by Kendo group – LVMH. He is currently CEO and Creative Director of his eponymous cosmetics brand, Michael Ashton Beauty.

== Early life ==
Ashton was born in Hamilton, New Zealand. At the age of nine, he discovered his mother’s Nutrimetics case, wet/dry eyeshadow, and hot rollers. He then talked his grandmother into letting him do her makeup backstage when she performed with his uncle Sir Howard Morrison.

Ashton went to Katikati Primary School, Waimata Primary School, and Bethlehem College. He taught himself how to use makeup from Keyvn Aucoin’s book ‘Making Faces'.

He later trained at Servilles Academy of Hairdressing before working at a high-profile salon in Auckland and moving into session styling. He also spent time in New York working alongside the MAC Cosmetics Pro Team and doing the show circuits around Europe.

== Career ==
Ashton first started working with celebrities when Girls Aloud and Jamelia came to New Zealand on promotional trips. He then started traveling to New York working alongside the M.A.C. Pro team with Gordon Espinet. When he first moved to London in 2006, he assisted Dick Page on the show circuit both in the U.K. and Europe. Through a friend in PR, he was connected to and worked with Bianca Jagger and Elle McPherson and subsequently began to focus on the red carpet.

In 2007, Ashton was introduced to Adele through a mutual friend in the lead-up to the release of her first album, 19. Later, Ashton became Adele's personal makeup artist for 12 years.

== Clients ==
Ashton's past clientele have included Alessandra Ambrosio, Adele, Nicole Scherzinger, Jing Lusi from Crazy Rich Asians, Penelope Cruz, and Rosie Huntington Whiteley.

== Brand Collaborations ==
Ashton was a "Global Artistry Ambassador" for Marc Jacobs Beauty from 2017 to 2019. This group also included Sarah Tanno (who did Lady Gaga's Super Bowl makeup) and Hung Vanngo, who were joining the same time.

== Awards ==
Winner of the Wella Young Protege Scholarship 2000.
