= Mount Eden Prisons =

Two prison facilities in Mount Eden, Auckland, New Zealand

Coordinates: 36.8671543°S 174.7669029°E

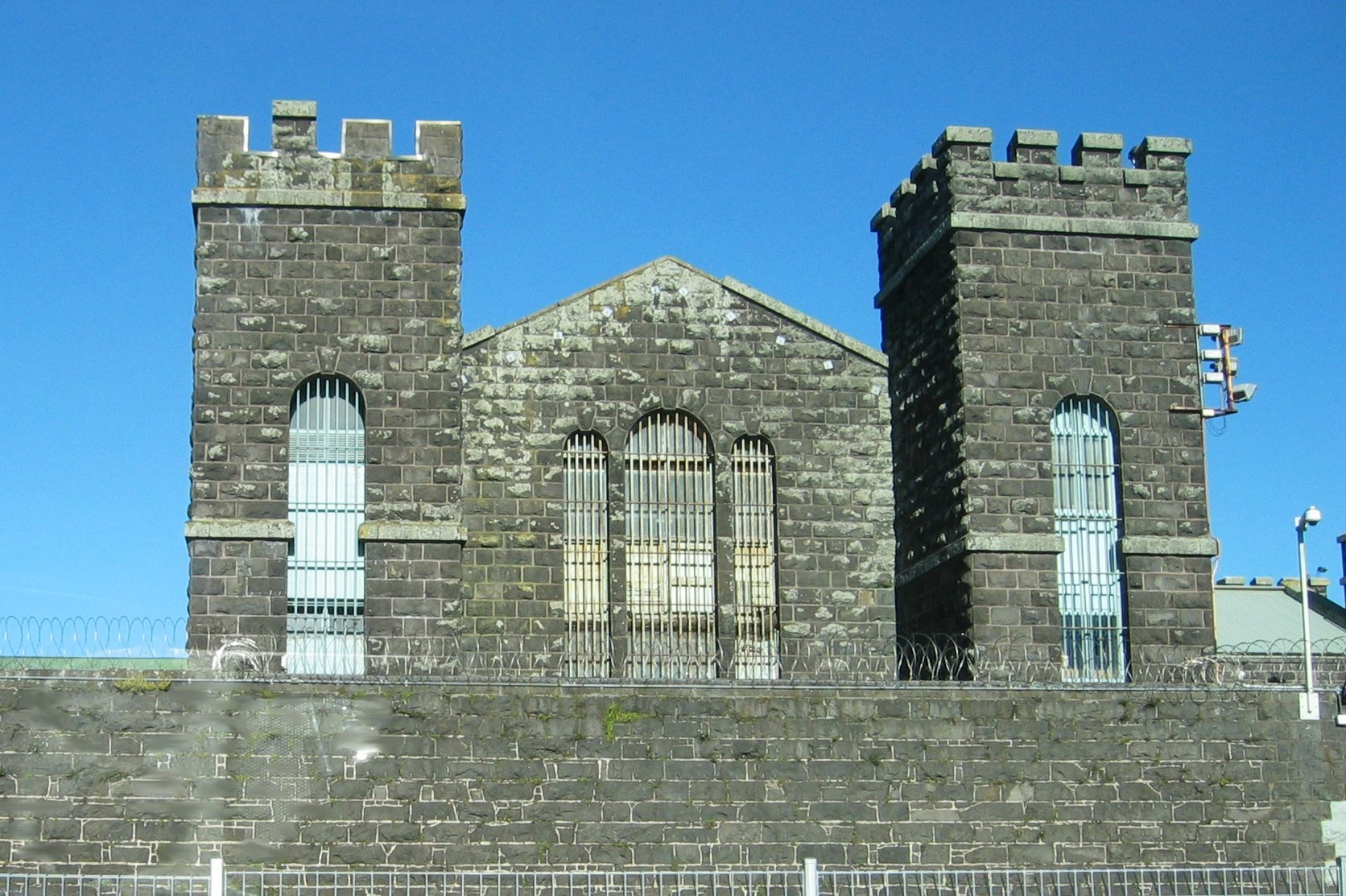
The old Mount Eden prison exterior.

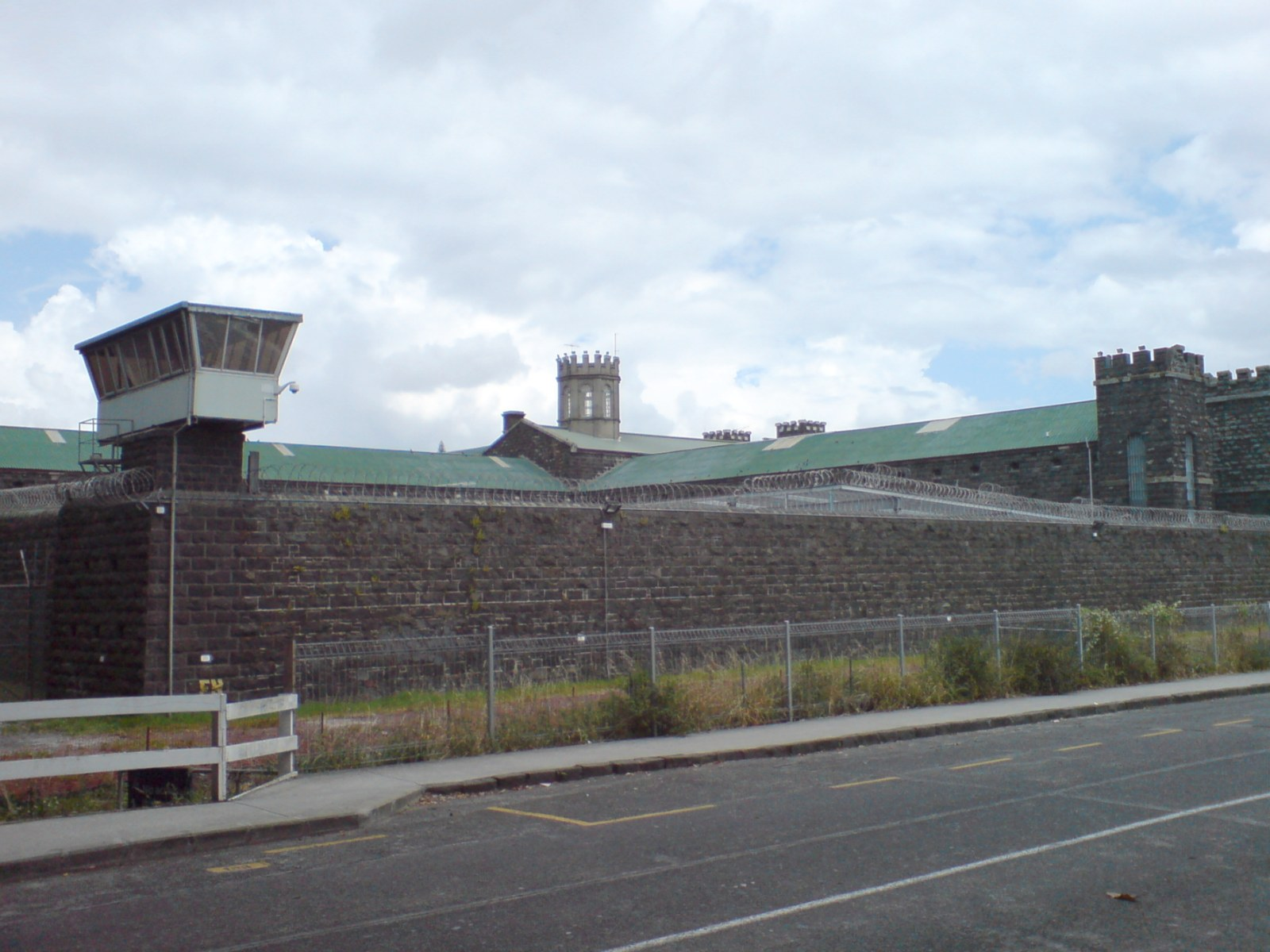
Exterior view of the old prison.

Mount Eden Prisons consists of two separate facilities in the Auckland, New Zealand suburb of Mount Eden — the Mount Eden Prison and the Mount Eden Corrections Facility.

== History ==
=== Origins ===
The original Mount Eden prison was a military stockade built in 1856. It became Auckland's main prison when the old city jail on the corner of Queen and Victoria Streets was demolished in 1865. The stone wall and the foundations were completed in 1872, the building proper was commenced in 1882 and finished in 1917.

The historic prison building was designed by government architect Pierre Burrows. Burrows design was based on HM Prison Wormwood Scrubs and other English prisons.

Early prisoners were used as labourers to quarry stone for use in road construction around Auckland, including the quarries at Maungawhau / Mount Eden and Auckland Grammar School, and is how the prison got the colloquial nickname of "Rock College" and there are tales of the early and/or longtime prisoners getting brick walls tattooed on their backs, a brick for each of the years incarcerated.

Prisoners were executed there and it was the site of New Zealand's last execution, in 1957 when Walter James Bolton was hanged for poisoning his wife Beatrice.

There were few escapes; with a song was written about one famous escaper, George Wilder. In 1963, he escaped and was free for 172 days, during which time he travelled 2,610 kilometres (1,620 mi) and committed 40 crimes. Pat Boone's song 'Speedy Gonzales' was rewritten by the Howard Morrison Quartet and became "George The Wilder Colonial Boy".

=== 1965 Mount Eden prison riots ===
There was a major riot on 20 and 21 July 1965. Prisoners rioted for 33 hours after a prison guard caught two prisoners trying to escape at 2:00 a.m. New Zealand Special Air Service troopers and NZ Army Gunners were brought in to help quell the mayhem and reinforce NZ Corrections staff and NZ Police officers. Chaos ensued as prisoners burnt much of the prison, including the prison records. Over 200 convicts were involved, with a response presence of 300 troops, police, and warders. A large fire was kept burning in the exercise yard, after some wings of the 83-year-old prison were gutted.

The riot was a sensational event for the pupils and staff of the two neighbouring boys' secondary schools, St Peter's College and Auckland Grammar School. The Minister for Justice announced a magisterial inquiry would be held. The old prison has been given a "Category I" classification by Heritage New Zealand.

=== 2000–2005 Auckland Central Remand Prison ===
In July 2000, the prison was kept in control of the Department of Corrections and a new building transferred to the control of Australasian Correctional Management Limited (later Global Expertise in Outsourcing NZ Ltd) and became New Zealand's first privately run prison. It was renamed the Auckland Central Remand Prison. However, the Labour Party was opposed to the privatisation of prisons, and in July 2005 put the prison back under the control of the Department of Corrections.

=== 2007 redevelopment ===
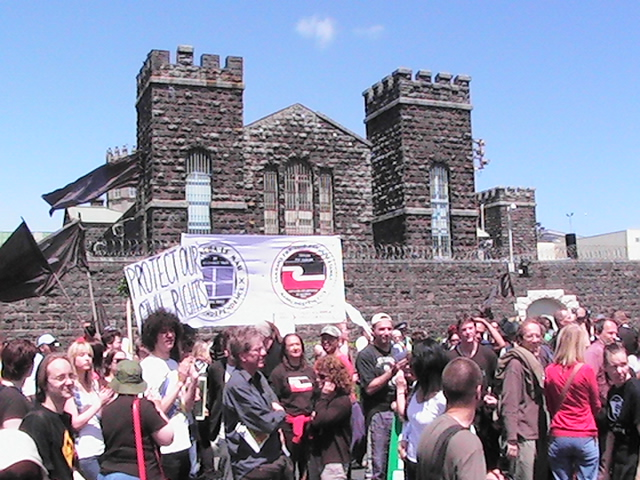
The Prisons have been the site of several protests. Pictured is a protest which took place in October 2007 over recent police raids.

In June 2007 it was announced that a new six-storey prison building and a four-storey accommodation block would be built on the southern side of the building by 2011, adding 450 beds. The Auckland Central Remand Facility was then amalgamated into a new Mount Eden Corrections Facility. The plan was for the old prison to be converted to administrative space, in accordance with its heritage classification. To date it has not happened and lays dormant.

The redevelopment included a secure gatehouse, a visitor centre and a multilevel car park added to the structure. Tunnels link the different sections. The barbed wire around the complex disappeared and was replaced by high and secure walls. There was some criticism of the proposed height of the new prison building, which at up to 30 metres (98 ft) is visible from the nearby motorway viaduct and towers over the surrounding area, which has a 15-metre (49 ft) building height limit. Vocal opponents included the former Mayor of Auckland, John Banks.

=== 2010–2015 Serco management ===
In May 2010, the National-led government decided contract management would again be implemented at Auckland Central Remand Prison. The contract was awarded to Serco, a British company that runs prisons in several different countries.

On 16 July 2015, footage of "fight clubs" within the prison emerged online and was reported by TVNZ. Serco was heavily criticised for not investigating until after the footage was screened. On 24 July 2015, Serco's contract to run the Mount Eden prison was revoked and operation was given back to the New Zealand Department of Corrections. Serco was ordered to pay $8 million to the New Zealand government as a result of problems at Mount Eden Prison while it was under Serco's management.

=== Recent developments ===
On 20 May 2026, the New Zealand Police arrested nine corrections officers at the Mount Eden Corrections Facility as part of a wider operation against criminal activity in prisons.

== Notable persons ==
Inmates

- Arapeta Awatere DSO, MC (1910–1976), military leader and politician, sentenced for murder of his mistress's lover in 1969.
- William Alfred Bayly (1906–1934), executed in 1934 for murdering two of his neighbours.
- Walter James Bolton (1888–1957), 1956 murder of his wife. Last person to be hanged in New Zealand.
- Roy Courlander (1914–1979), British-Nazi collaborator.
- Kim Dotcom (born 1974), founder of now-defunct file hosting service Megaupload, and another cloud storage service called Mega.
- Thomas Hall (c. 1848–1929), held for 21 years for attempted murder, and forgery.
- Rua Kēnana Hepetipa (1869–1937), Tūhoe prophet and land rights activist, held on a charge of sedition in 1916.
- John Christopher Higgins (?–1938), perpetrator of the 1923 Waikino school shooting.
- Marc Hunter (1953–1998), lead vocalist of rock band Dragon, incarcerated for drug and alcohol matters in 1978.
- Christopher John Lewis (1964–1997), who attempted to assassinate Queen Elizabeth II in 1981. Charged with 1997 murder.
- Charles Mackay (1875–1929), lawyer, politician and mayor, gaoled for 1920 attempted murder.
- Tigilau Ness (born 1955), Niuean New Zealand activist held for nine months for opposing apartheid during the 1981 Springbok Tour.
- Bill Parry (1878–1952), politician and trade unionist, gaoled for role in 1912 Waihi miners' strike.
- Juliet Hulme (1938–2023), co-murderer of Honorah Parker in the 1954 Parker-Hulme murder case. She changed her name to Anne Perry later.
- Brian Tamaki (born 1958), religious Leader. Briefly held on remand in 2022 for breaching bail by attending a protest breaching COVID-19 restrictions.
- Edward Te Whiu (1935–1955), executed in 1955 for murdering an elderly woman during a robbery.
- Robert Wallath (1874–1960), highwayman from New Plymouth.
- George Wilder (born c. 1939), escaped three times in 1960s.
- Ahmed Zaoui (born 1961), Algerian refugee, held 2002–2004.

Staff

- Grace Gooder (1924–1983), international cricketer, and head nurse at the prison (1974–1983).
- Selwyn Muru (1937–2024), artist, became a part-time art tutor at the prison in 1962.
- Simon O'Connor (born 1976), former politician, who undertook prison chaplaincy as training to become a Catholic priest.

== See also ==
- Auckland Prison (Paremoremo)
- Capital punishment in New Zealand
