= Atareta Maxwell =

New Zealand singer and dancer

Atareta "Dina" Carol Maxwell, born Atareta Morrison (30 August 1945 – 16 January 2007) was a kapa haka leader.

== Early life ==
Maxwell was born to Temuera Morrison and Kahu (Gertie) Morrison. She was a sister to Sir Howard Morrison, Judith Tapsell, Rene Mitchell, Laurie Morrison, and Linda Morrison. Her brother Laurie later became the father of Temuera and Taini Morrison.

Her first paying job was with Guide Kiddo's concert group at Whakarewarewa but her taste for competition came from joining the St Faiths Church Youth Club.

== Career ==
Atareta and Trevor Maxwell led the leading kapa haka group Ngati Rangiwewehi for several years, taking it to the top of national competitions with performances at the Edinburgh Military Tattoo in Scotland and in 2005 opening the New Zealand Toi Maori exhibition in San Francisco.

Her leadership skills have been acknowledged as the best in the country through winning the award for the coveted Aotearoa Traditional Maori Performing Arts Festival 'National Kai Tiaki Wahine (best female leader) - Most Outstanding Leader' at Ngaruawahia in 1992 and again in 1996 at Rotorua.

She was also before her death a tutor of the Western Heights High School kapa haka group Te Roopu Manaaki; they came first equal in the 2004 national secondary schools kapa haka festival held in Wellington.

In sport Maxwell captained both netball and softball teams for Rotorua Girls' High School and the winning team of the very first Kurungaituku Netball Tournament played in Rotorua.

She opened the 2005 Cricket World Cup with her rendition of Pokarekare Ana.

== Death ==
Maxwell died at Waikato Hospital on 16 January 2007. She is survived by husband Trevor Maxwell, deputy mayor of Rotorua, son Inia and daughter Kahurangi. Maxwell's body lay at Tamatekapua meeting house, Te Papaiouru Marae, Ohinemutu, until she was buried at Kauae Cemetery in Ngongotahā on January 20, 2007.

The Māori king, Tūheitia Paki and his Tainui-Waikato people brought her body back from Waikato hospital to her Ohinemutu home.
