= Shell (theater) =

Structural element of a theatre

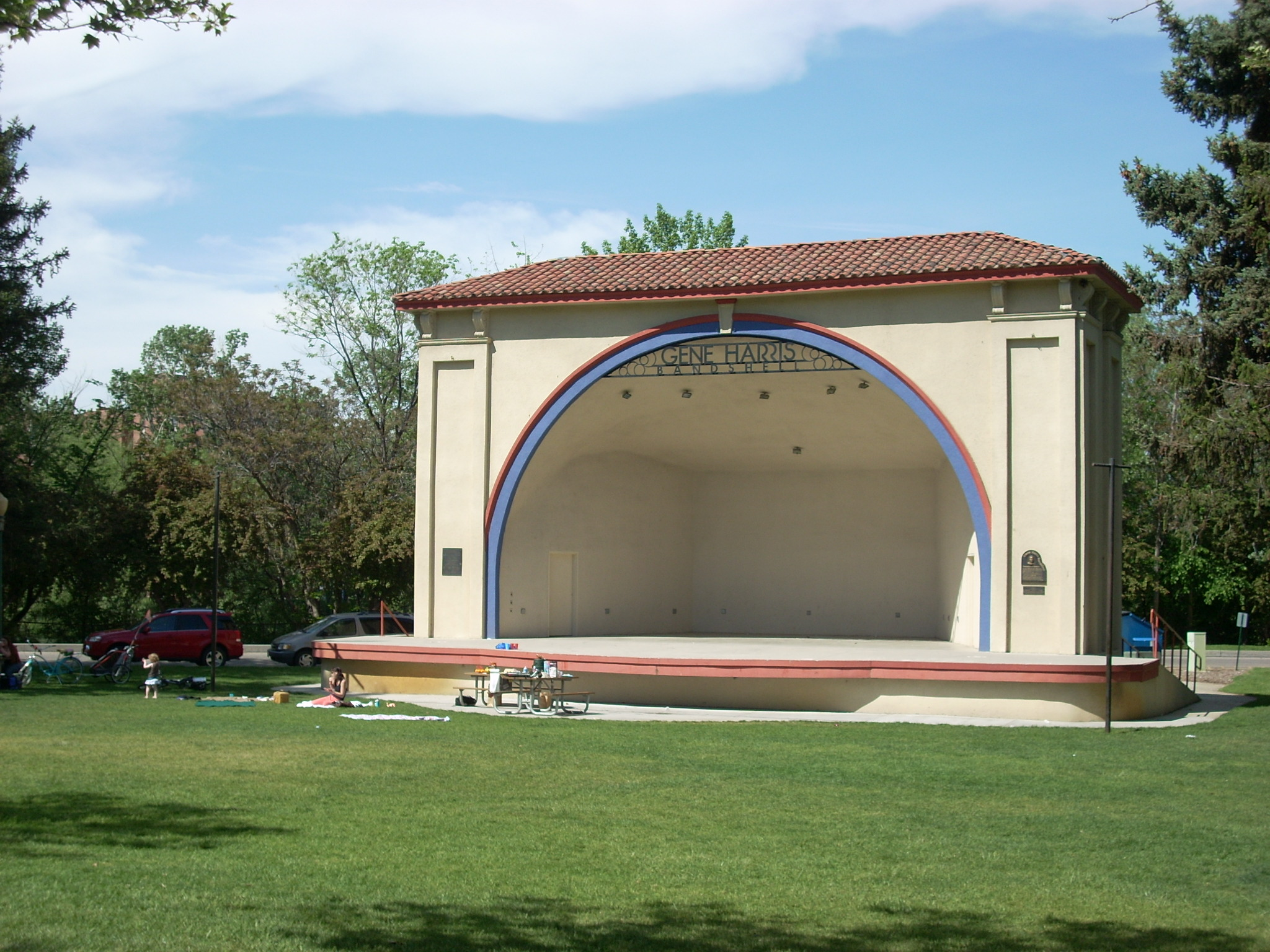
The Gene Harris bandshell at Julia Davis Park in Boise, Idaho, a municipal example.

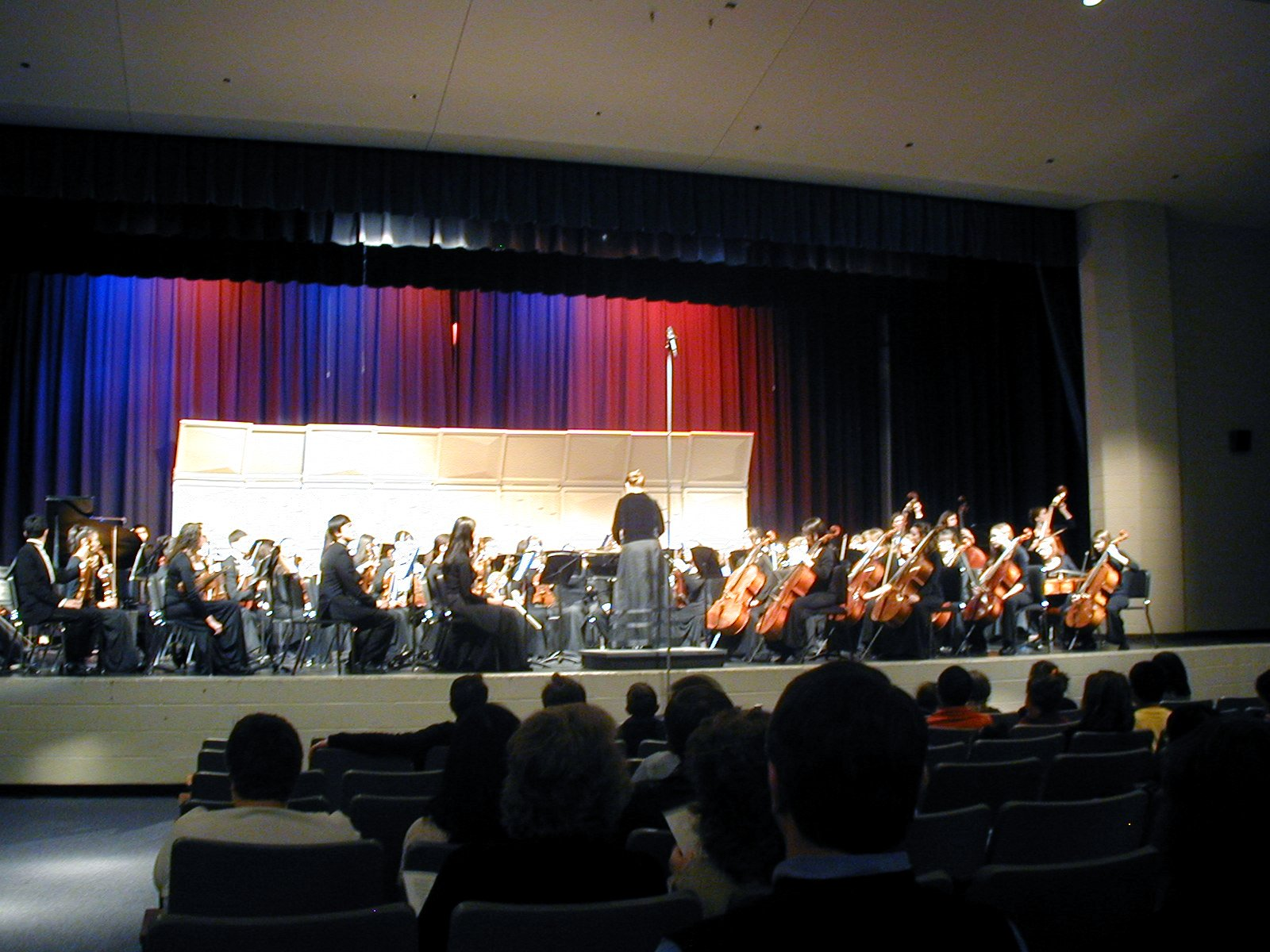
An image of the Lake Braddock Symphony Orchestra performing at District IX Festival, on March 18, 2006, at Centreville High School. Behind the orchestra is a simple shell.

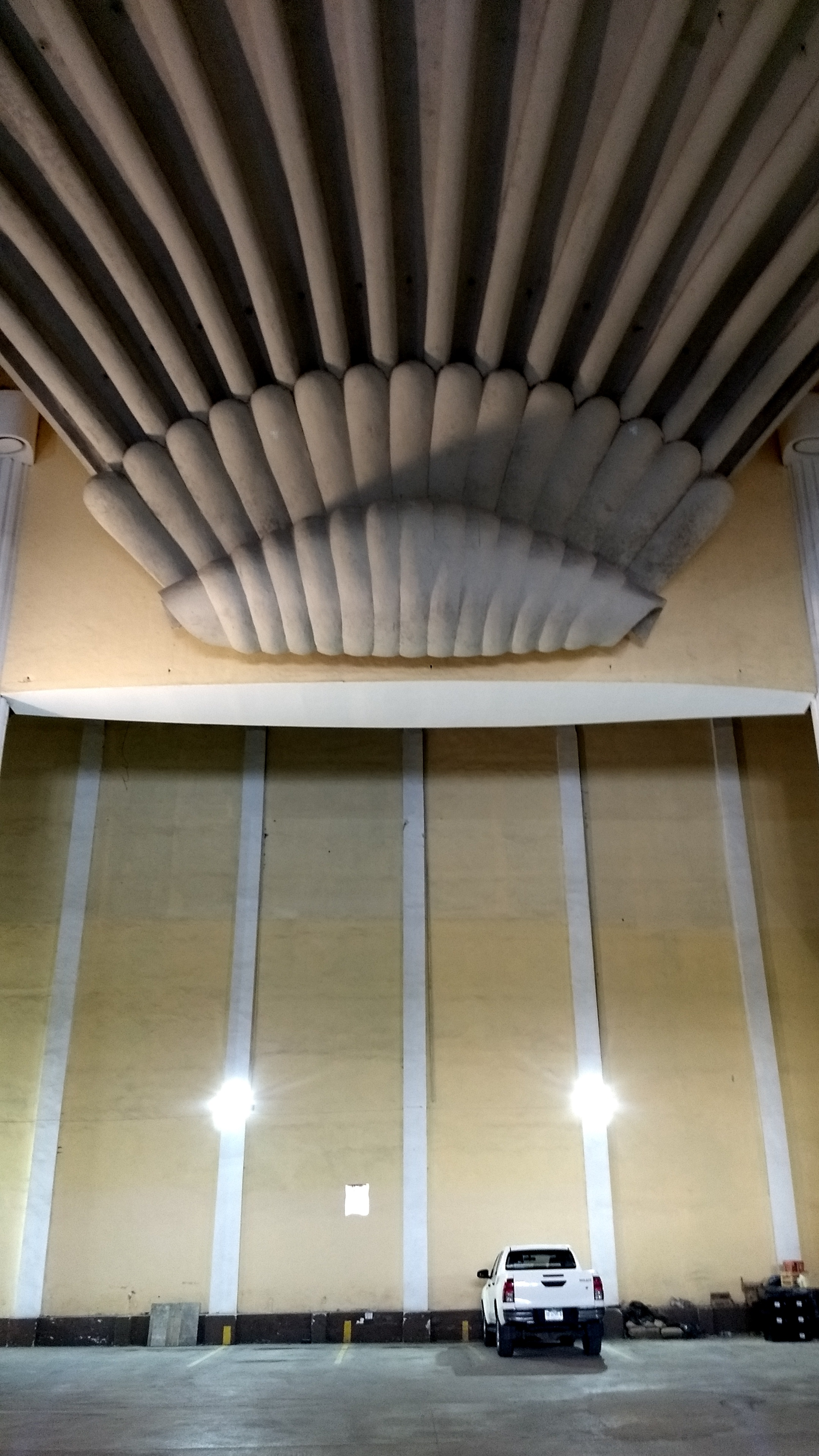
Acoustic shell of the former Avenida cinema in San Luis Potosí, Mexico. It is now located in the parking lot of a restaurant

In theatre, a shell (also known as an acoustical shell, choral shell or bandshell) is a curved, hard surface designed to reflect sound towards an audience.

Often shells are designed to be removable, either rolling away on wheels or lifting into a flyspace. Shells are most commonly used for orchestras, bands and choirs, although they can also be used in any application that requires passive sound amplification. Shells are generally made of hard materials, because they are designed to absorb as little sound as possible.

== History ==
Acoustical shells were developed to reflect sound outward, focused in one direction as opposed to the ″sound in the round″ diffused from all sides of the open gazebo bandstand. In the United States they were built in large city parks and amusement parks as bands increased in size.

Free−standing outdoor shells in a variety of styles were built starting in the 1890s. Professional architects were often employed to design them with varying degrees of acoustical success. The Hollywood Bowl shell, based on a 1928 prototype by Lloyd Wright, has been rebuilt several times with the present structure being the fifth on that site.

Rectangular pavilions with enclosed shell and stage, similar to one in Boise, Idaho (pictured), were being built after 1900. These proved very effective as outdoor performing venues, and many are still in use.

== Rotorua Soundshell ==
The Rotorua Soundshell was an outdoor shell theatre in the Rotorua CBD on the shore of Lake Rotorua, New Zealand. Built in 1947, it was the locale for the Rotorua Soundshell Talent Quest, won in 1956 by the original Howard Morrison Quartet, thereby launching the career of Sir Howard Morrison. The shell building was replaced in 1958 by a modern structure that thrived until its demolition in 2019, retaining its original name despite no longer being an acoustic shell.

== See also ==
- Amphitheatre
- Bandstand
- Hollywood Bowl
- List of contemporary amphitheatres
