= George Wilder (criminal) =

New Zealand prison escaper

George Wilder (born c. 1939) is a prison escaper and New Zealand folk hero. Wilder escaped from prison three times in the 1960s, and his escapades captured the attention of the public.

== First escape (1962) ==
Wilder was in New Plymouth Prison on 17 May 1962. Part way through a four-year sentence for shopbreaking and theft related to his favourite Jaguar cars, he scaled the 10 metres (33 ft) high wall that day and was not recaptured until 21 July. During those 65 days, he captured the attention of the New Zealand public when newspapers began reporting several hair-raising escapes from the dozens of police tasked with his capture.

The stories of Wilder's escapades, included "wild drives through police barricades, evading large search parties, escaping a police dog by swimming across a river, and getaways by dinghy and horse - all with no hint of violence". At one stage he is reported to have even joined in a shoulder to shoulder search through rough country for himself, slipping away from his pursuers when the opportunity arose. These exploits seemed to have caught something in the public imagination and Wilder was to a large extent cheered on by large sections of the New Zealand public.

Finally, Wilder was sighted on 21 July near Whakamaru. A large force of police and soldiers, including three dogs, was mobilised to catch him. Constable Hamilton saw Wilder break from cover and gave chase, but Wilder dashed down a steep bank and disappeared from view. He was found a few hours later, hiding in a hole by a logging road, and taken back to jail.

== Second escape (1963) ==
Wilder escaped again six months later on 29 January 1963, this time from Mount Eden Prisons in the heart of Auckland, New Zealand's largest city. He escaped with three other prisoners by making a rope of sheets and scaling the wall with it, after knocking a warder unconscious. The other three had also previously escaped. This time, he managed to avoid recapture for 172 days. It was during this period that his folk hero status was firmly established. Wilder would often break into holiday homes or premises and leave apology and thank you notes for the owners. People began leaving food out for him.

Eventually, after evading police for 172 days, Wilder was captured again on 17 July 1963 in a hut at Rununga Bush, 3 kilometres (1.9 mi) off the Napier-Taupo highway. During the time he was at large, he travelled 2,610 kilometres (1,620 mi) and allegedly committed 40 crimes. In the hut when found, he had three loaded rifles, but offered no resistance.

A popular musical group, the Howard Morrison Quartet, released a single called "George, the Wild(er) New Zealand Boy" in September 1963 about him, which, despite being banned by New Zealand's state owned broadcasters, went immediately to number 1 in the charts and stayed there for some ten weeks.

== Third escape (1965) ==
Restored to life in prison, Wilder made one more attempt at freedom but this, his final escape, was short-lived. In 1965 he escaped with two other prisoners, armed with a sawn-off shotgun. They kidnapped a prison warder at gunpoint and holed up in a house in Mount Eden with another hostage. After three hours, the trio surrendered to the Armed Offenders Squad and Wilder went back into custody, where he remained until he was paroled in 1969.

However, he got into trouble for allegedly stealing rifles and escaped by rowing across the Firth of Thames. He was eventually captured and returned to prison to serve out the remainder of his sentence, which had been extended by his escapes.

== Later life ==
On 20 June 1969, Wilder was finally released from prison and moved to the Wairarapa coast. Since then he has kept a low profile and refused all attempts by the media to contact him. He was reportedly still living in 2015.
