= Taini Morrison =

New Zealand kapa haka performer (1958–2009)

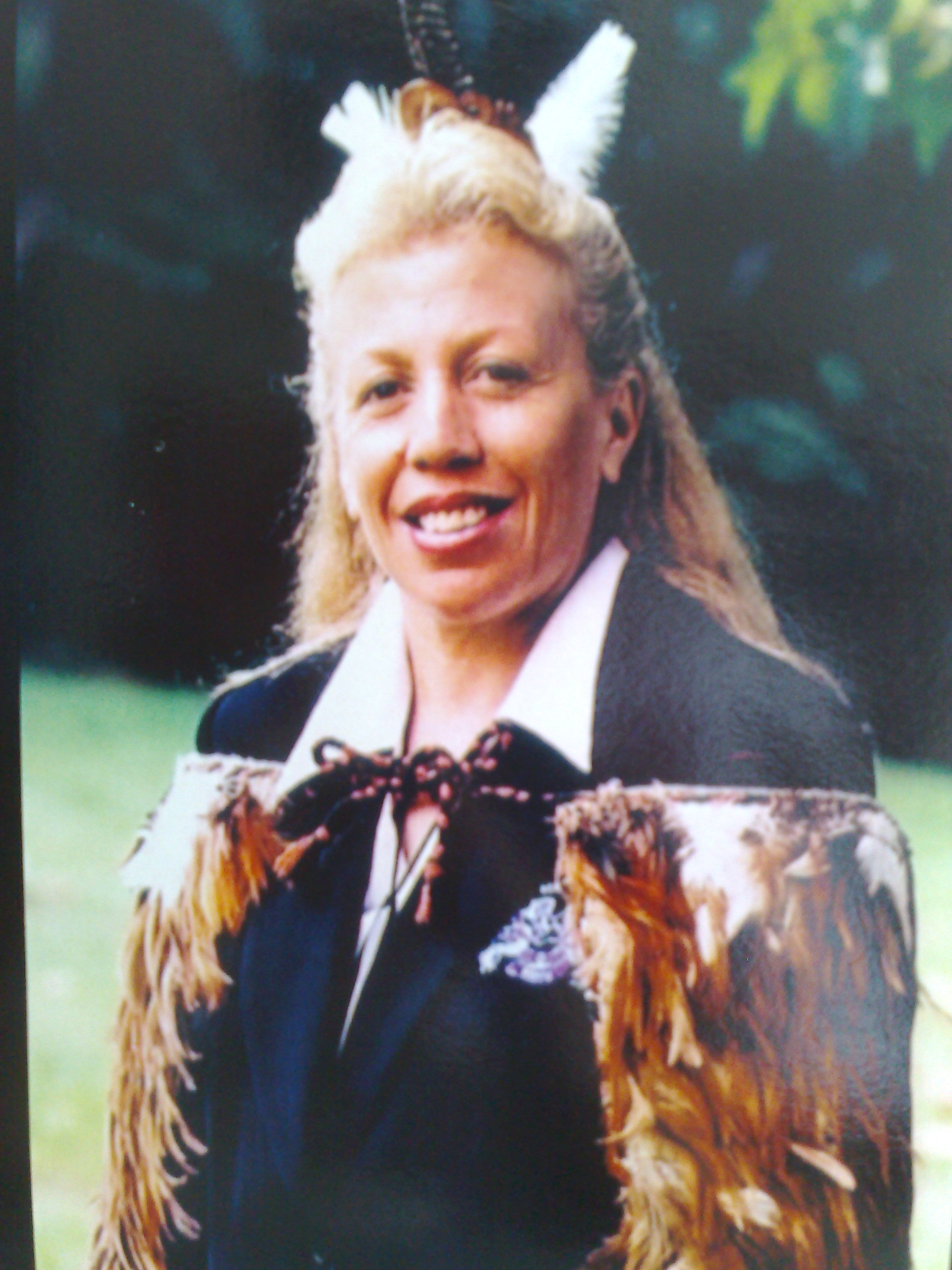
- Born: Taini Hannah Merenia Morrison c. 1958
- Died: 8 June 2009 (aged 50–51)
- Occupation: Kapa haka performer
- Spouse: Tawhiao Hare
- Children: 2
- Relatives: Temuera Morrison (brother); Howard Morrison (paternal uncle); Atareta Maxwell (paternal aunt)

Taini Hannah Merenia Morrison (c. 1958 – 8 June 2009) was a kapa haka performer in New Zealand.

== Career ==
=== Te Matarae-i-o-Rehu ===
She was well noted for her love and passion for the 'old ways'. A leader and one of the founding members of the award-winning Māori performing group, Te Matarae-i-o-Rehu, Morrison played a crucial part in the group's award-winning performance at the 2002 Te Matatini Festival. As well as performing on national and international stages, she also taught at Rotorua Primary School.

=== Māori Performing Arts ===
Taini Morrison has had a crucial influence on modern day Māori Performance. She has paved the way for many of New Zealand's top female performing arts members. She has been referred to by fellow group leader, Wetini Mitai-Ngatai, for her passion for kapa haka and love of the old ways. He also describes her by adding, "Mana and presence just oozed out of her. She was with the group almost since its inception. She was a great leader with a strong personality, I will miss her so much."

=== Wider Community ===
Besides performing, she also taught at Rotorua Primary School for six years. Her work with the school went as far as working and helping the children enhance their reading and oral abilities. She was recognised as a mentor to the young children at the school. Her work in the local Rotorua area has been evident as the School Principal, Mr John Naera goes on to say:

"In the past few years, she had taken over the Ngati Whakaue Enrichment Unit working with children to enhance their reading and oral learning,"

"She had a passion for ensuring our Maori children got every opportunity to succeed. That passion for our youth will be sorely missed."

== Death ==
On the early morning of 8 June 2009, Morrison was pronounced dead from a suspected heart condition. The local community, education centres, government leaders and family members were shocked to hear of the news. Co-leader of the Māori Party Dr. Pita Sharples said:

“I knew Taini from her work with cultural groups throughout Te Arawa, most notably as co-leader of Te Matarae I Ōrehu,”

“Her stunning leadership of the triumphal return of Te Arawa to Te Matatini was enough to win Taini the title of Kaitātaki Wahine Toa this year. She performed to a very high standard, with great integrity. To many Māori women, Taini was the icon of expression of performing arts.”

Another Māori Party MP, Te Ururoa Flavell, also made remarks on Morrison saying:

"Taini was a mana wahine who epitomised on and off the stage ‘te ihi, te wehi, te mana"

Her body was taken to her family marae of Te Papa-i-o-uru at Ohinemutu at 11am. A funeral service was held on the next Thursday.

== Personal life ==
Taini Morrison was part of the talented Morrison family. She was the niece of legendary New Zealand singer Sir Howard Morrison and sister of the internationally acclaimed actor Temuera Morrison. She was of Ngāti Whakaue, Te Arawa descent. She was married to Tawhiao Hare of Patuheuheu, Waiohau. They had two children, Miriama and Te Wharekotua, and three grandchildren belonging to their eldest child, Miriama.
