= Robert Wallath =

New Zealand highwayman (1874–1960)

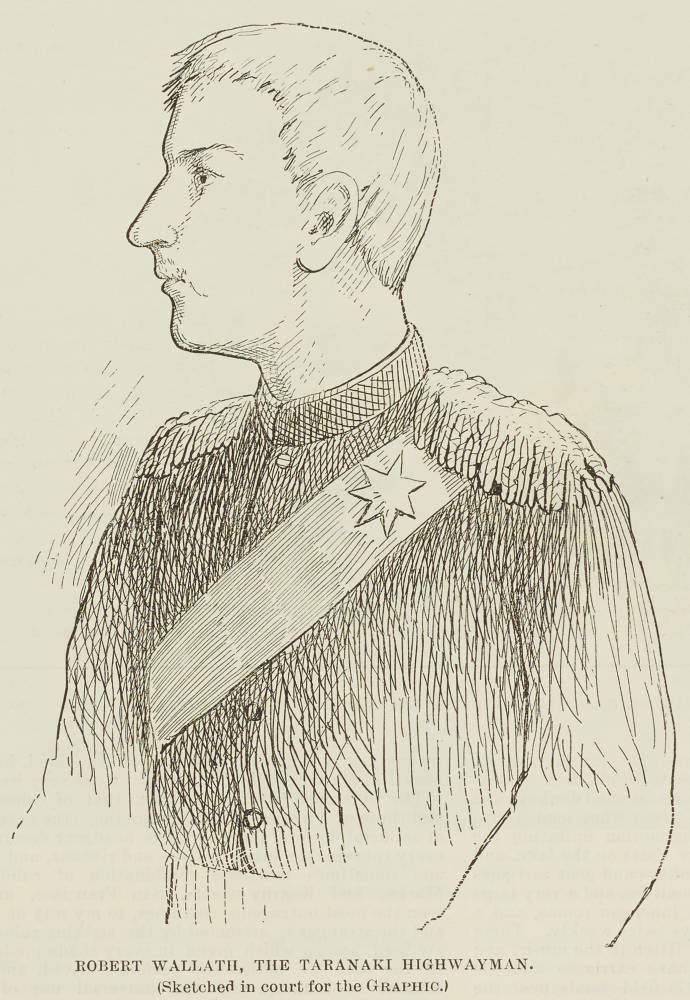
- Born: Robert Herman Wallath; 18 July 1874; At sea
- Died: 24 July 1960 (aged 86); New Plymouth, Taranaki, New Zealand
- Resting place: Hurdon Cemetery

Robert Herman Wallath (18 July 1874 – 24 July 1960) was a New Zealand highwayman, carpenter, and farmer.

== Biography ==
Born at sea in 1874, he was the son of a respected family of German immigrants to New Plymouth. Wallath's crime spree went on for 15 months until he was overpowered when holding up a hotel. There was general astonishment when it was discovered who the perpetrator was. Wallath was sent to Mount Eden Prison in Auckland for eight years, but because of support from New Plymouth people, he was released after four and a half years in 1898. He returned to New Plymouth and married Ada Clara West in June 1901, with whom he had four children (one of whom was adopted), and they had an exemplary lifestyle and were respected members of the community.

In 1959, Wallath wrote a book about his teenage struggle with good and evil, A highwayman with a mission, under the pseudonym Georgie. He died on 24 July 1960, and was survived by his wife by two years.

== Legacy ==
Wallath Road in New Plymouth commemorates the Wallath family. In 1893 a book, The New Plymouth highwayman: his history, plucky capture, and examination in the police court, was published. A song about him was written and performed by Chris Priestley and The Unsung Heroes. In 2024, there was an episode of the Radio New Zealand podcast Black Sheep about Wallath.
