= Racism in New Zealand rugby union =

Rugby union is the national sport of New Zealand with the All Blacks as the national team. The All Blacks are made up of many races and cultures, and seven of the fifteen starters in the 2011 Rugby World Cup final were of Polynesian descent. However, although the national team has a long history of success, it also has on occasion been the subject of racial issues. On the international stage there has been controversy in the tours of and by South Africa, the most famous of which was the 1981 tour by South Africa. These tours drew much international criticism as many states were boycotting South Africa due to apartheid. On the domestic stage there have been issues of racism in the Super Rugby competition. There have also been some instances of racism in college rugby and club rugby. Racism is quite a serious human rights issue in New Zealand, which was highlighted in the Universal Periodic Review by the United Nations Human Rights Council.

== Rugby tours of South Africa ==
Due to apartheid in South Africa, it was the policy of the New Zealand Rugby Union not to select Māori players for tours to South Africa prior to 1970. There was much internal and external criticism of the tours, with the slogan 'No Māori - No Tour' being prominent in New Zealand. Recently the Human Rights Commissioner has commended this as the starting point of the campaign to stop the tours. In 1969 an anti-racist rugby tour group named Halt All Racist Tours (HART) was set up to protest future games between New Zealand and South Africa. Some tours were called off due to such pressure, the most controversial of the tours to go ahead was the 1981 tour.

=== Background ===
The first tour by a South African Rugby team was in 1921. The South African team played one game against a team named the natives, which was made up entirely of Māori. A South African journalist reported that the Springboks were ‘frankly disgusted’ at playing against ‘a band of coloured men'. One telegraph sent back to South Africa by a journalist stated;

"Bad enough having to play officially designated New Zealand Natives, but spectacle thousands Europeans frantically cheering on band of coloured man to defeat members of own race was too much for Springboks who frankly disgusted."

Because of this policy many of New Zealand's greatest Māori players, such as George Nēpia, missed out on these tours. Public opinion was strongly against the tours and eventually lead to a change. Despite this Māori were still avid supporters of their national team. When the policy was changed in 1970 only four Māori were allowed to travel and were classified as 'honorary whites'. The obvious trouble with accepting the tours was that New Zealand would be seen as supporting the Apartheid regime. However, it is easy to overlook the fact that many players grow up hoping to one day play for the All Blacks and to miss out would be devastating.

=== Halt All Racist Tours ===
The tour policy of South Africa was not well received by the public in New Zealand. In 1969 a group of Auckland University students headed by John Minto formed the group Halt All Racist Tours(HART). The main purpose was to provide a group to protest the tours. The 1970 tour went ahead but South African Rugby Football Union allowed a mixed team to be sent. One of the ways that HART got its message around was by using Badges. The 1973 tour was postponed due to public pressure put on the Labour government, pressure which HART was a major player in. HART's main function was to organise and co-ordinate protests, and while it was not the major player in the 1981 protests it still is seen as one of the main reasons for the eventual discontinuance of the tours. Many other protest groups developed from the same ideals promoted by HART, one prominent group that was very much involved in racial issues was CARE, an organisation that shared many members with HART.

=== 1976 tour and Olympic boycott ===
In 1976 the All Blacks toured South Africa, with five Maori players and one of Samoan origin.

After the IOC did not sanction New Zealand in regard to the 1976 Summer Olympics, a boycott of the games was organised. Twenty-nine countries boycotted the games due to the refusal of the IOC to ban New Zealand, after the New Zealand national rugby union team had toured South Africa earlier in 1976. The boycott was led by Congolese official Jean-Claude Ganga. Some of the boycotting nations (including Morocco, Cameroon and Egypt) had already participated, however, and withdrew after the first few days. Senegal and Ivory Coast were the only African countries that competed throughout the duration of the Games. Elsewhere, Afghanistan, Albania, Burma, Iraq, Guyana, Sri Lanka and Syria also opted to join the Congolese-led boycott. South Africa had been banned from the Olympics since 1964 due to its apartheid policies. Some other countries, such as El Salvador and Zaire, did not participate in Montreal for purely economic reasons.

=== 1981 tour ===
Although there were issues surrounding all the tours, the 1981 Tour is seen as the most controversial. There were protests all over New Zealand many of them descending into violence dividing the country into two opposing sides. There were over 200 protests which lead to roughly 1500 arrests within a 56-day period. The protest did much to divide families as well, one witness stated;

"Although things had been far from perfect between my parents, the Springbok tour caused such tension and stress that we could not live together in the same house and function as a family unit."

This shows that it was not just a protest around rugby, but also on societal structure and moral values. The protest campaign galvanised and strengthened New Zealand's anti-racist movement. The aftermath of the tour was that there was to be no official sporting contact until apartheid ended. There was one rebel tour by an unofficial team named the Cavaliers in 1986 which embarrassed the New Zealand government who in turn banned the players for two tests. A recalcitrant apology to Māori came in 2010, but only after the South African Rugby Union did so at the prompting of the republic's then minister for sport, Makhenkesi Stofile.

== Super Rugby and racism ==
New Zealand has five teams in the Super Rugby competition that is contested between themselves, Australia and South Africa. While there has been success on the field some teams have been plagued by racism off it. New Zealand is a vastly culturally diverse nation and the Super Rugby teams and management reflect this. The issues are not always a product of the teams actions and policies, but many of the issues stem from the supporters of the teams. Much of this is said to highlight an undertone of racism that is common among ageing rugby supporters who stereotype rugby positions and ability.

=== Crusaders racial selection policy allegation ===
In 2010 it was suggested that the Crusaders rugby team selection policy was racist. The allegation that was made was that the Crusaders selection policy was to only include three non-European players. Andy Haden made the accusation that the Crusaders racially discriminate because they select different races on the basis that they are suited to different positions. The club adamantly denied the allegation with many players coming out saying that the claims have no basis. Prime Minister John Key has said that the claims made by Haden were offensive and incorrect. Whether or not this claim was true is still debated, but it highlighted the fact that many people still believe that not all players are equal in skill on the field and that racism could still be present at the top club level.

=== Racial criticism of Pat Lam and the Blues ===
In 2012 the Auckland Blues manager Pat Lam was racially abused via social media by fans that were unsatisfied with his team's performance. There was also criticism leveled at the team itself, mainly suggestions that the Pacific Island and Māori players were to blame. The head of New Zealand Rugby, Steve Tew, said the taunts aimed at Pat Lam are appalling, and that it highlights that racism is still present in New Zealand society. The abuse was via social media meaning and those making the taunts were not identifiable.

== Racism and grass roots rugby ==
There have been a few instances of racism at grass roots level, in particular at high school and top amateur divisions. This racial abuse has been said to be New Zealand rugby's dirty secret on more than one occasion.

=== Racism in high school rugby ===
Evidence of racism at college level came when eight players from St Bedes College who used the social media website Facebook to make abusive comments about Polynesian players from Wesley College. Their comments included criticism of the Island players' intelligence and that the only reason they succeed in rugby was due to their 'superior brawn'. The rector of St Bedes declared he was disgusted by the comments. A complaint was made to the Human Rights Commission over the matter.

=== Racism at club level ===
There have been examples of racism in club level rugby. One example reported was when a brawl at a game between Celtic and McKenzie was said to have been a reaction to the racial abusing of a Polynesian player. Other examples include spectators racially abusing players at a King country game and a Māori commentator stating that he was abused.
