= Temuera Morrison =

New Zealand actor (born 1960)

Temuera Morrison MNZM
- Morrison in 2026
- Born: Temuera Derek Morrison; 26 December 1960 (age 65); Rotorua, New Zealand
- Other name: Tem
- Education: Wesley College, Auckland; Western Heights High School
- Occupation: Actor
- Years active: 1972–present
- Known for: Jake "The Muss" Heke; Dr. Hone Ropata; Jango Fett; Boba Fett; Clone troopers
- Partner: Angela Dotchin (1997–2002)
- Children: 2
- Relatives: Taini Morrison (sister); Sir Howard Morrison (uncle); Atareta Maxwell (aunt); Michael Ashton (cousin)

Temuera Derek Morrison MNZM (born 26 December 1960) is a New Zealand actor who first gained recognition in his home country for playing Hone Ropata on the soap opera Shortland Street. He garnered critical acclaim for starring as Jake "The Muss" Heke in the 1994 film Once Were Warriors and its 1999 sequel What Becomes of the Broken Hearted?.

Outside of New Zealand, Morrison gained international fame for his roles in the Star Wars multimedia franchise as the Mandalorian bounty hunters Jango Fett and Boba Fett, the latter being a genetic clone of the former. His first Star Wars appearance was in the 2002 film Attack of the Clones, where he played Jango as well as the original clone troopers who were also based on Jango's genetics; he later voiced Boba Fett in the 2004 re-release of The Empire Strikes Back and various Star Wars video games, before portraying Boba fully in the second season of The Mandalorian (2019–present) and its spin-off series The Book of Boba Fett (2021–2022). In 2022, he had a recurring role in the black ops thriller series Echo 3. Morrison is known for voicing Chief Tui, the father of the Moana in Disney's Moana (2016), and for playing Arthur Curry's father Tom Curry in the DCEU films Aquaman (2018), The Flash (2023), and Aquaman and the Lost Kingdom (2023).

== Early life ==
Morrison was born on 26 December 1960 in the town of Rotorua, on the North Island of New Zealand. He is the son of Hana Morrison (née Stafford), and musician Laurie Morrison. He is Māori, of Te Arawa (Ngāti Whakaue) and Tainui (Ngāti Maniapoto, Ngāti Rarua) whakapapa, and also has Scottish and Irish ancestry. His sister was performer Taini Morrison and his uncle was musician Sir Howard Morrison. His secondary education took place at Wesley College, Auckland, and Western Heights High School, Rotorua.

== Career ==
=== 1973–2014: Film and music ===
Morrison's film debut is the 1973 film Rangi's Catch, playing the title character. He trained in drama under the New Zealand Special Performing Arts Training Scheme, or SPATS, a 20-week artistic training program created by Sir Howard Morrison. One of his earliest starring roles was in the 1988 film Never Say Die, opposite Lisa Eilbacher. After this he played Dr. Hone Ropata on the television soap opera Shortland Street from 1992 to 1995.

In 1994, he received attention for his role as the violently abusive Māori husband Jake "The Muss" Heke in Once Were Warriors, a film adaptation of Alan Duff's novel Once Were Warriors. The film became the most successful local release in New Zealand, and sold to many countries. The role won him international acclaim and he received the award for best male performance in a dramatic role at the 1994 New Zealand Film and Television Awards. He reprised the role in the sequel, What Becomes of the Broken Hearted?, for which he received the Best Actor award from the New Zealand Film Awards. Morrison said in 2010 that he felt typecast by the role, to the point that it was "a millstone round my neck". In 1996, he appeared in the Pamela Anderson film Barb Wire.

He has appeared in supporting roles in Speed 2: Cruise Control (1997) and The Beautiful Country (2004). In 2005, Morrison became the host of the talk show The Tem Show on New Zealand television.

In the 1996 Queen's Birthday Honours, Morrison was appointed a Member of the New Zealand Order of Merit, for services to drama.

He started writing an autobiography in 2009, which he hoped would inspire others to "reach for the stars".

He released his debut album, Tem, through Sony Music Entertainment NZ in late November 2014. It consists of covers of songs that his father, and uncle Sir Howard Morrison, had performed at local venues when he was growing up.

=== 2002–2023: Star Wars films, video games and television ===
Morrison became widely known outside of New Zealand with his role as bounty hunter Jango Fett in the 2002 film Star Wars: Episode II – Attack of the Clones. Part of the plot involves an army of clones created with Jango's DNA, so Morrison also provided the voice acting for the clones. He reappeared as several clones in Star Wars: Episode III – Revenge of the Sith, and re-recorded the lines of the character Boba Fett (Jango's clone "son") in the 2004 DVD re-releases of the original Star Wars trilogy, replacing the voice of Jason Wingreen.

Morrison has since portrayed Jango Fett and his clones in several Star Wars video games, all produced by LucasArts. He played the clone commando "Boss" in Star Wars: Republic Commando (2005), voiced all the troopers in Star Wars: Battlefront (2004), and voiced both Jango and Boba Fett in its sequel, Battlefront II (2005). Morrison reprised his role as Jango in Star Wars: Bounty Hunter (2002), a game centered around the character, and LEGO Star Wars: The Video Game (2005), along with his clones, but was uncredited in the latter. He voiced Boba in the 2006 game Star Wars: Empire at War, and DICE's Star Wars Battlefront (2015) and Battlefront II (2017), the latter of which were produced by EA.

Morrison physically portrayed Boba Fett for the first time in the second season of The Mandalorian (2020). In the show, Morrison portrays an aged, weathered version of the character. Morrison's Fett has heavy scars on his face, and wears dark robes before reclaiming and restoring his armor. Morrison says that with the physically worn appearance, he adjusted his voice to be more gravelly, as if Boba's vocal cords were affected by his past traumas. With the role, Morrison was also able to bring a bit of his own Māori culture to Fett's portrayal. In an interview with The New York Times, he said that he "wanted to bring that kind of spirit and energy, which we call wairua, [to the role]" and used that influence in his on-screen fight scenes, both in the hand-to-hand combat and while wielding weapons.

In 2020, a spinoff of the series The Mandalorian was announced, titled The Book of Boba Fett. Morrison reprises his role as Boba Fett, following Fett's life after the events of the 1983 film Return of the Jedi. The series premiered on 29 December 2021.

In 2022, Morrison made a cameo appearance as a homeless veteran clone trooper in the Obi-Wan Kenobi TV series. In 2023, he voiced Rex and other clones in an episode of the first season of Ahsoka.

=== 2008–present: Other roles ===
Morrison returned to Shortland Street for six weeks in June and July 2008 to reprise the role of Dr. Hone Ropata.

In 2008, he appeared on New Zealand skit comedy television show Pulp Sport, in a sketch that made fun of him being cloned.

Morrison has appeared in several DC Comics-related films. In the 2011 film Green Lantern, he portrayed Abin Sur. In 2018 he played lighthouse keeper Tom Curry, the father of the title character, in Aquaman. Morrison reprised the role in The Flash, released in 2023, and Aquaman and the Lost Kingdom, which released in December 2023.

Morrison also provided the voice of Moana's father, Chief Tui, in the 2016 animated Disney film of the same name. He reprised the role in the 2024 sequel, and also provided Tui's singing voice instead of Christopher Jackson.

He portrayed Kahekili in the 2025 Hawaiian period drama miniseries Chief of War executive produced and co-starred by Jason Momoa for Apple TV+.

== Personal life ==
Morrison lives in New Zealand, and divides his time between filming there, Australia, and the United States. He has an adult son from a relationship in the late-1980s with singer Kim Willoughby from the all-girl group When the Cat's Away; and a daughter with Peata Melbourne. He was in a relationship for six years with his Shortland Street co-star Angela Dotchin. Morrison's partner is Ashlee Howden-Sadlier, who is of Māori heritage.

== Filmography ==
=== Film ===
Year	Title	Role	Notes
1972	Rangi's Catch	Rangi	
1984	Other Halves	Tony	
1988	Never Say Die	Alf Winters	
1988	Mauri	Young Cop	
1988	The Grasscutter	Sergeant Harris	Television film
1994	Once Were Warriors	Jake 'The Muss' Heke	
1996	Barb Wire	Axel Hood	
1996	The Island of Dr. Moreau	Azazello	
1996	Broken English	Manu	
1996	Little White Lies	Tim	
1996	Whipping Boy	Jack	Television film
1997	Speed 2: Cruise Control	First Officer Juliano	
1998	Six Days, Seven Nights	Jager	
1999	What Becomes of the Broken Hearted?	Jake 'The Muss' Heke	
1999	From Dusk till Dawn 3: The Hangman's Daughter	Mauricio / The Hangman	Direct-to-video
2000	Vertical Limit	Major Rasul	
2001	Crooked Earth	Will Bastion	
2001	Ihaka: Blunt Instrument	Tito Ihaka	Television film
2002	Star Wars: Episode II – Attack of the Clones	Jango Fett	
2002	Star Wars: Episode II – Attack of the Clones	Clone troopers	Voice; performed by Bodie Taylor
2004	The Beautiful Country	Snakehead	
2004	Blueberry	Runi	
2004	Star Wars: Episode V – The Empire Strikes Back DVD Special Edition	Boba Fett	Voice (replaced Jason Wingreen)
2005	Star Wars: Episode III – Revenge of the Sith	Commander Cody	
2005	Star Wars: Episode III – Revenge of the Sith	Clone troopers	Role shared with Bodie Taylor
2005	River Queen	Te Kai Po	
2005	The Reluctant Hero	Narrator	TV documentary
2008	Rain of the Children	Rua Kenana	Documentary
2009	The Immortal Voyage of Captain Drake	Don Sandovate	Television film
2009	Couples Retreat	Briggs	
2009	The Marine 2	Damo	Direct-to-video
2010	Tracker	Kereama	
2011	Green Lantern	Abin Sur	
2012	The Scorpion King 3: Battle for Redemption	King Ramusan	Direct-to-video
2012	Fresh Meat	Hemi Crane	
2013	Mt. Zion	Dad	
2016	Mahana (The Patriarch)	Grandfather Mahana	
2016	Hard Target 2	Madden	Direct-to-video
2016	The Osiris Child: Science Fiction Volume One	Warden Mourdain	
2016	Moana	Chief Tui (voice)	
2018	Occupation	Peter Bartlett	
2018	Aquaman	Thomas Curry	
2019	The Brighton Miracle	Eddie Jones	
2019	Dora and the Lost City of Gold	Powell	
2019	Mosley	Warfield	
2021	Occupation: Rainfall	Peter Bartlett	
2023	The Flash	Thomas Curry	Cameo
2023	Aquaman and the Lost Kingdom	Thomas Curry	
2023	Sons of Summer	Frank	
2024	Ka Whawhai Tonu	Rewi Maniapoto	
2024	Moana 2	Chief Tui (voice)	Also provides vocals; Morrison reprises his role in the film's Māori language dubbing as well
2026	The Wrecking Crew	Governor Peter Mahoe	
2026	The Bluff	Lee	

Key
†	Denotes works that have not yet been released

=== Television ===
Year	Title	Role	Notes
1986	Seekers	Selwyn Broadhead	10 episodes
1987	Adventurer	Maru	10 episodes
1987–1990	Gloss	Sean	Recurring role
1990	Shark in the Park	Mason / Mark	Episode: "Ten-Zero, Dingo"
1992–1995, 2008	Shortland Street	Hone Ropata	Main role
1995	New Zealand at War	Narrator	Documentary miniseries
2001–2002	Mataku	Presenter / Host	
2005	The Tem Show	Presenter / Host	Talk show
2006	Bro'Town	Himself	Voice, episode: "Know Me Before You Haunt Me"
2011	Spartacus: Gods of the Arena	Doctore	2 episodes
2012	Missing Christmas	Jack TePania	Voice, animated Christmas special; Precursor of series The Barefoot Bandits
2013	The Life and Times of Temuera Morrison	Himself	Documentary miniseries
2014	Happy Hour	Presenter / Host	
2015	The Barefoot Bandits	Jack TePania	Voice, main role (9 episodes)
2015	Tatau	Anaru Vaipiti	Miniseries; Main role
2016	This Is Piki	Bill Mercer	
2018	Frontier	Te Rangi	4 episodes
2020–2023	The Mandalorian	Boba Fett	4 episodes
2020–2023	The Mandalorian	Clone troopers	Voice, episode: "Chapter 20: The Foundling"
2021	Star Wars: Visions	Boba Fett	Voice, episode: "Tatooine Rhapsody"; English language dub
2021–2022	The Book of Boba Fett	Boba Fett	Lead role; 6 episodes
2021–2022	The Book of Boba Fett	Clone troopers	Voice, episode: "Chapter 6: From the Desert Comes a Stranger"; uncredited
2022	Obi-Wan Kenobi	Veteran clone trooper	Episode: "Part II"
2022	My Life Is Murder	Frankie Jones	Episode: "The Village"
2022	Echo 3	Roy Lennon	2 episodes
2023	Spirit Rangers	Ngārara	Voice, episode: "A Tale of Tails"
2023	Far North	Ed	Main role
2023	Ahsoka	Captain Rex, Clone troopers	Voice, episode: "Part Five: Shadow Warrior"
2024	Secret Level	Old Salt	Voice, episode: "Armored Core: Asset Management"
2025	Chief of War	Chief Kahekili	Miniseries

=== Video games ===
Year	Title	Role	Notes	Source
2002	Star Wars: Bounty Hunter	Jango Fett	Voice	
2004	Star Wars: Battlefront	Republic infantry, republic officer	Voice	
2005	Star Wars: Republic Commando	RC-1138 "Delta 38"	Voice	
2005	Lego Star Wars: The Video Game	Jango Fett, clone troopers	Voice; Uncredited	
2005	Star Wars: Battlefront II	Narrator, Boba Fett, Jango Fett, republic officer 1, retired clone trooper	Voice	
2006	Star Wars: Empire at War	Boba Fett	Voice	
2015	Star Wars Battlefront	Boba Fett	Voice	
2017	Star Wars Battlefront II	Boba Fett	Voice	
2023	Star Wars Jedi: Survivor	Boba Fett	Voice	
