= Te Papaiouru Marae =

Marae in Rotorua, New Zealand

Coordinates: 38°7′43.05″S 176°14′54.96″E

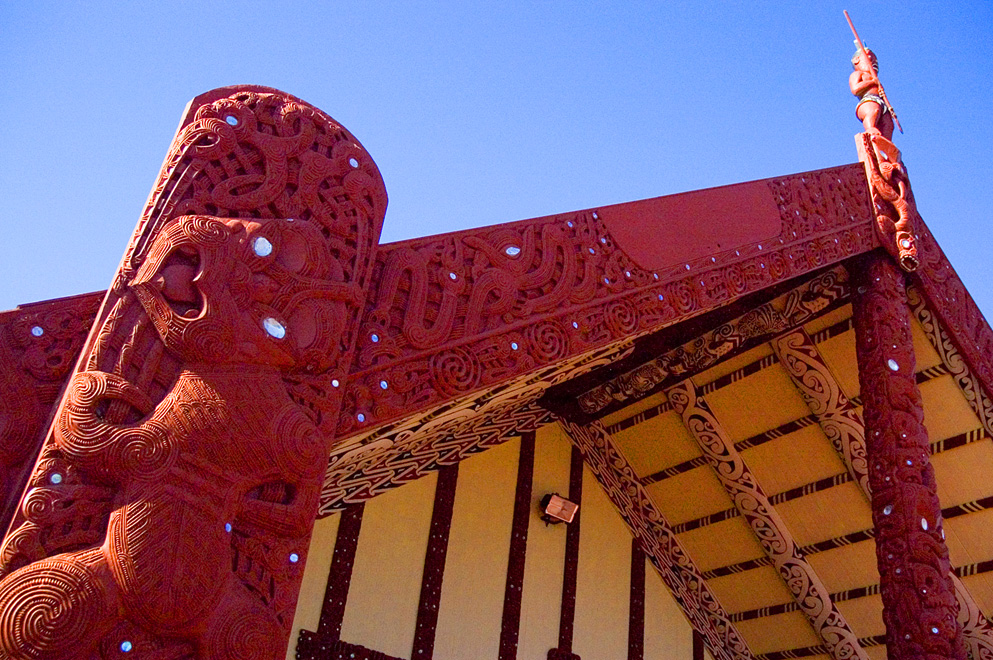
Tamatekapua is the wharenui or meeting house on Te Papaiouru marae

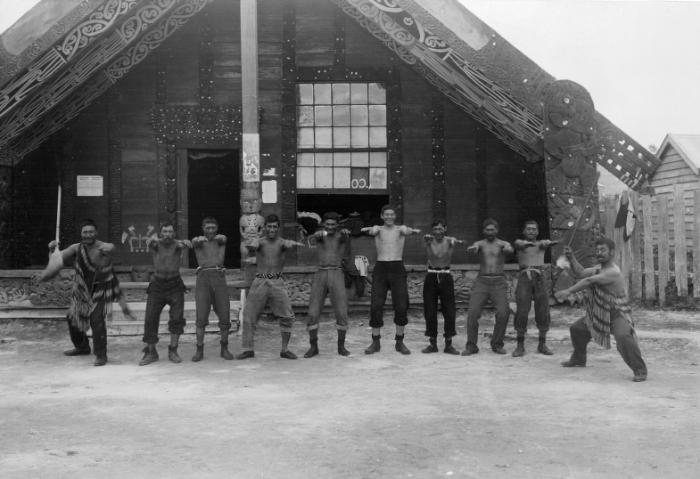
Men performing a haka on Te Papaiouru Marae, circa 1908

Te Papaiouru is a marae at Ohinemutu, Rotorua, New Zealand. It is the home marae of the Ngāti Whakaue subtribes Ngāti Tae-o-Tū and Ngāti Tūnohopū. The marae's carved wharenui (meeting house), Tamatekapua, is named after Tama-te-kapua, the chief or captain of the Te Arawa canoe, which came to New Zealand from Polynesia in about 1350.

== History ==
Tamatekapua meeting house was first opened in the centre of Ohinemutu in 1873, but was demolished in 1939. It was rebuilt and reopened in 1943. Many of its carvings may be much older. An earlier Tamatekapua meeting house stood on Mokoia Island in Lake Rotorua. Te Kotahitanga (the Māori parliament) met at Ohinemutu in 1895, and many significant people have been welcomed onto Te Papaiouru Marae, including British royalty. Te Rorooterangi and Tūnohopū are two other meeting houses at Ohinemutu.
